= Asunción =

Capital and most populous city of Paraguay

Asunción Paraguay (Guarani) Nuestra Señora Santa María de la Asunción
- Capital city and district
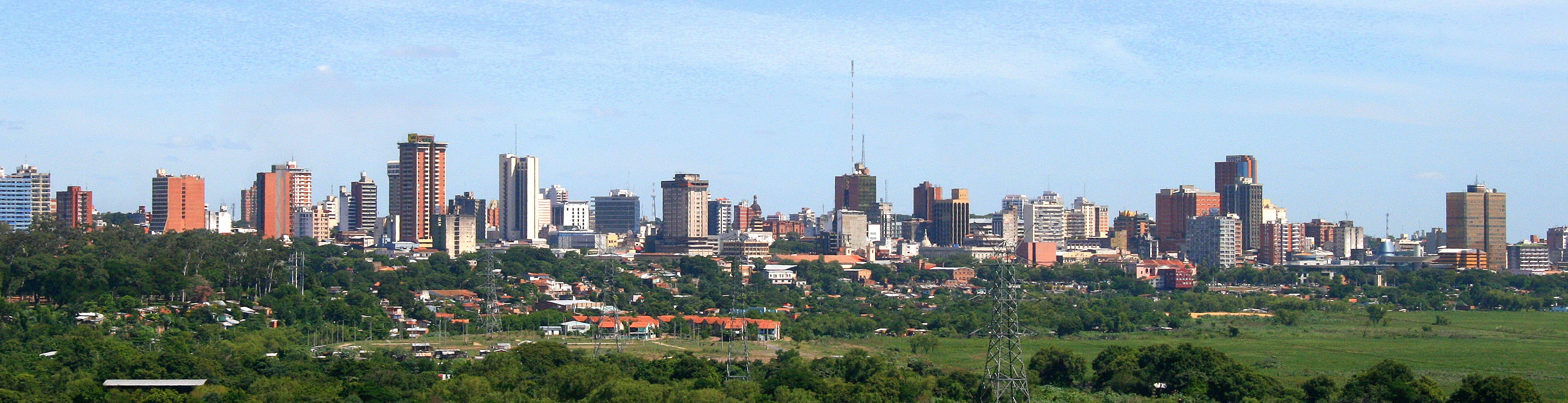
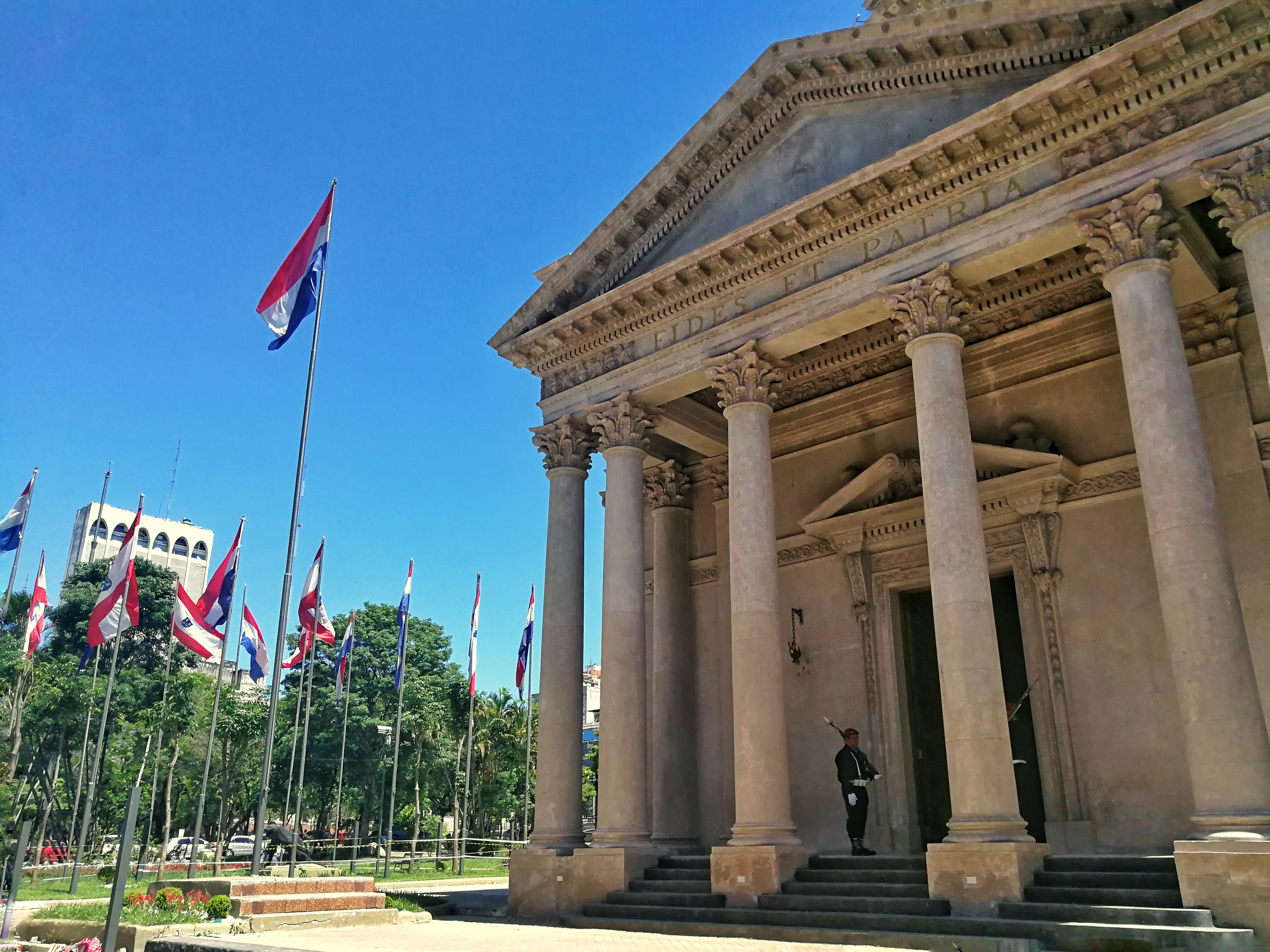
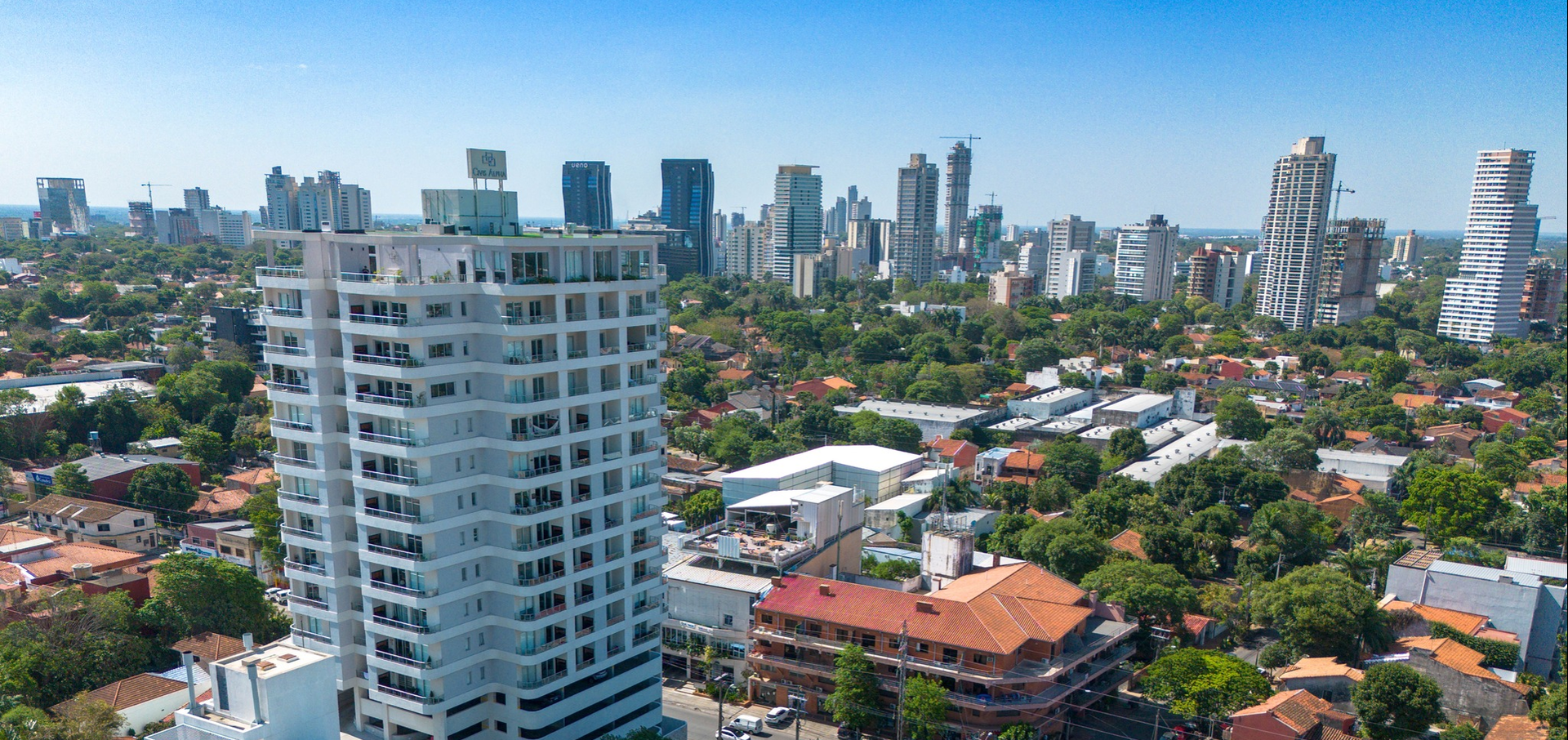
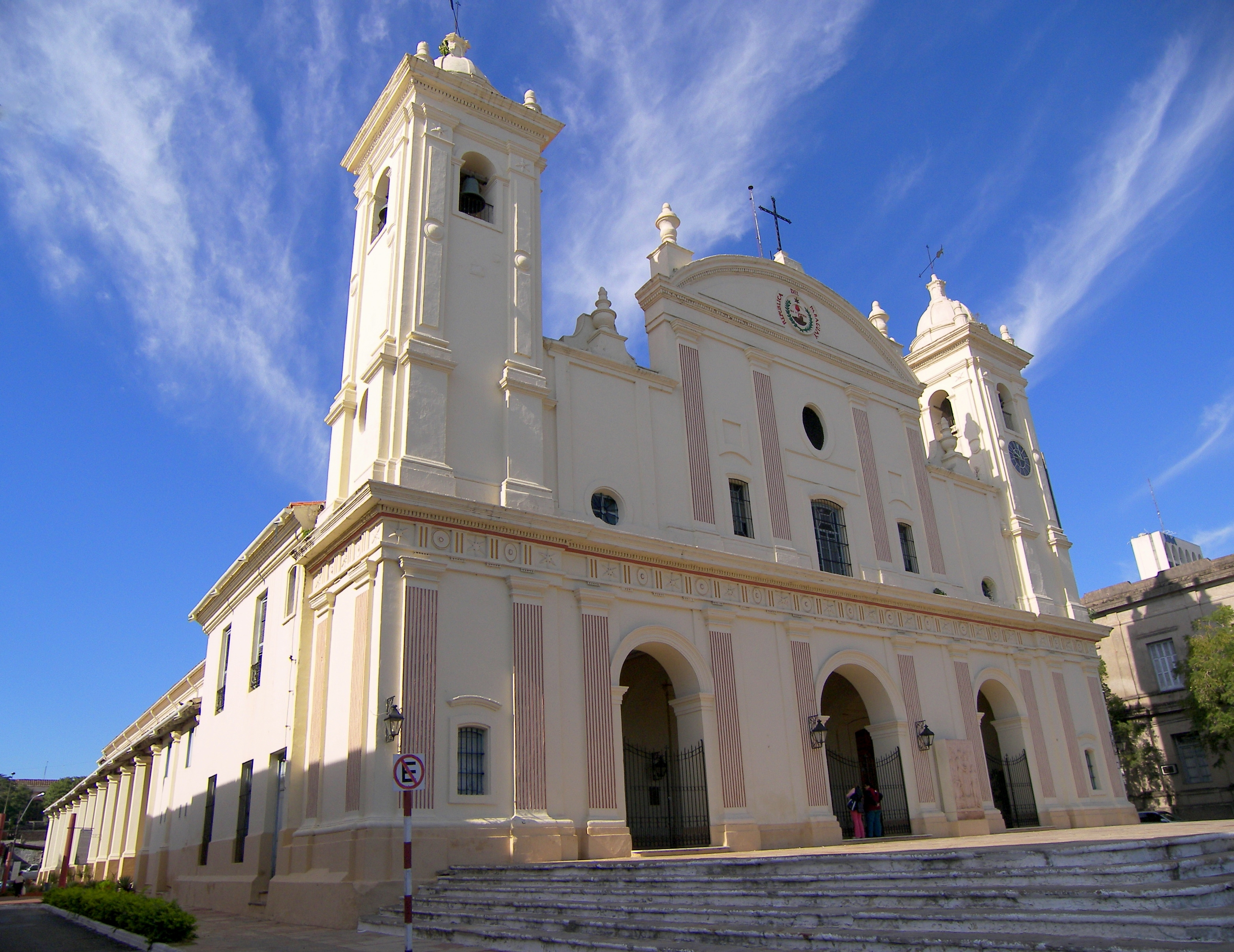
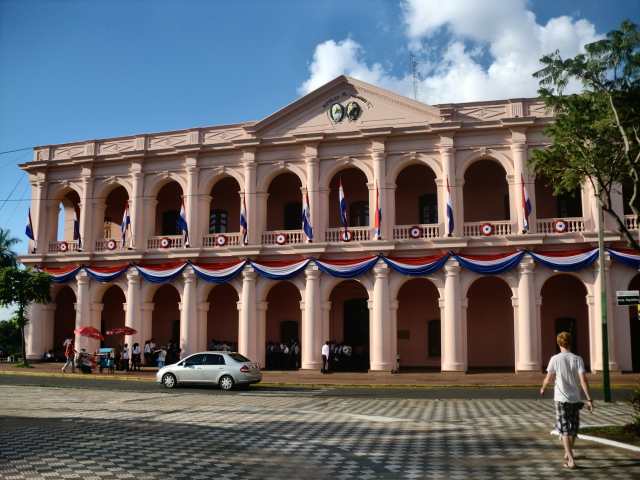
- Skyline of Old town Asunción Palace of the López National Pantheon of the Heroes Aerial view of the corporate-residential axis Asunción Cathedral Cultural Center of the Republic

- Flag Coat of arms
- Nicknames: Madre de Ciudades (The Mother of Cities); Capital Mundial de la Amistad (The World's Capital of Friendship); Cuna de la Libertad de América (Cradle of the Freedom of America)
- The Capital District in Paraguay

- Location within Paraguay Location within South America
- Coordinates: 25°16′48″S 57°38′4″W
- Country: Paraguay
- District: Capital District
- Founded: 15 August 1537; 489 years ago
- Named for: Assumption of Mary

Government
  - Intendant: Soledad Núñez

Area
  - Capital city and district: 117 km^{2} (45 sq mi)
  - Metro: 1,035 km^{2} (400 sq mi)
- Elevation: 120 m (390 ft)

Population (2022)
  - Capital city and district: 462,241
  - Rank: 1st in Paraguay
  - Density: 3,950/km^{2} (10,200/sq mi)
  - Metro: 2,480,616
- Demonym(s): Asunceno, -a

GDP (PPP)
  - Year: 2026
  - Total (Metro): $69.386 billion
  - Per capita: $27,978
- Time zone: UTC−03:00 (PYT)
- Postal codes: 001001–001535
- Area code: +595 (21)
- ISO 3166 code: PY-ASU
- Climate: Cfa
- Website: www.asuncion.gov.py (in Spanish)

Asunción (English: /ɑːˌsuːnsiˈoʊn, ˌɑːsuːnˈsjoʊn/, Spanish: [asunˈsjon]; Guarani: Paraguay) is the capital and the largest city of Paraguay. The city lies on the eastern bank of the Paraguay River, immediately north northeast of the confluence where it is joined by the Pilcomayo River. The Paraguay River separates Asunción from the Occidental Region of Paraguay to the northwest, and from Argentina to the southwest. The eastern part of the city is surrounded by the Central Department.

Asunción is one of the oldest cities in South America and the longest continually inhabited area in the Río de la Plata Basin; for this reason it is known as "the Mother of Cities". From Asunción, Spanish colonial expeditions departed to found other cities, including the second foundation of Buenos Aires, that of other important cities such as Villarrica, Corrientes, Santa Fe, Córdoba, Santa Cruz de la Sierra and 65 more. According to the 2022 Paraguayan Census, Asunción has 462,241 inhabitants, while its metropolitan area (known as Greater Asunción) exceeds 2.3 million inhabitants, making it the most densely populated area in Paraguay, and also the most productive as it concentrates 70% of the National GDP. Asunción is the third most populous "jurisdiction" or "political division" in the country, after the Central and the Alto Paraná.

Administratively, the city forms an autonomous capital district, not a part of any department. The metropolitan area, called Gran Asunción, includes the cities of San Lorenzo, Fernando de la Mora, Lambaré, Luque, Mariano Roque Alonso, Ñemby, San Antonio, Limpio, Capiatá and Villa Elisa, which are part of the Central Department. The Asunción metropolitan area has around two million inhabitants. The Asunción Stock Exchange lists the Municipality of Asunción as BVPASA: MUA. Asunción has been named as one of the best cities for investments, both in construction and services, thus being one of the cities in the region with the highest economic growth, nowadays.

It is the headquarters of the three state powers (executive, legislative and judicial), the cultural center of the republic and the different agencies and entities of the state. It used to be the main river port of the country, a function that Villeta occupies today. Despite the situations throughout its history, Asunción continues to be the center of national and cultural activities. From the capital, the main state resolutions and projects are issued, and the banking, economic, cultural, diplomatic, social, union and industrial entities of the country are centralized. Most of the main routes to the main cities of the country begin here. It is the headquarters of the Permanent Review Court of Mercosur. In the metropolitan area of Asunción, the district of Luque is the headquarters of the South American Football Confederation (CONMEBOL). Asunción will host the 2031 Pan American Games.

It is located in a strategic area for Mercosur, in the center-north of the Southern Cone, close to cities such as Buenos Aires, Montevideo, Córdoba, Rosario, Curitiba, São Paulo, Porto Alegre and Santa Cruz de la Sierra. It is located about 1,300 km (810 mi) from the Pacific Ocean and about 1,000 km (620 mi) from the Atlantic Ocean, being relatively equidistant between both oceans, a factor that promotes economic growth and disposes it to becoming a regional hub.

The Globalization and World Cities Research Network classifies Asunción as a "Gamma City". It is the home of the national government, principal port, and the chief industrial, political, economic and cultural center of Paraguay. Asunción ranks as one of the cheapest cities in the world for foreign visitors, and the third-safest capital in Latin America, behind Buenos Aires and Santiago, according to InSight Crime.

== Etymology ==
The official name of the city is "Nuestra Señora de la Asunción" (Our Lady of the Assumption), according to the founding document of the Cabildo, dated 16 September 1541. The fort that preceded it was established with the same name on 15 August 1537, by Juan de Salazar de Espinosa, the day on which the Catholic Church commemorates the Assumption of Mary.

Asunción comes from the Latin noun, of ecclesiastical use, assumptiō, defined as: "the Virgin Mary being elevated body and soul to heaven" and must be distinguished from the Ascension of Jesus. Although the dogma was not proclaimed until 1950, the festival dates back to the 9th century and was especially celebrated in Spain and America.

Its name in Guarani is Paraguay: Paraguái in Guarani. The name was later used to refer to the whole nation.

== History ==
=== Early history ===
The Spanish conquistador Juan de Ayolas (died c. 1537) may have first visited the site of the future city on his way north, up the Paraguay River, looking for a passage to the mines of Upper Peru (present-day Bolivia). Later, Juan de Salazar y Espinosa and Gonzalo de Mendoza, a relative of Pedro de Mendoza, were sent in search of Ayolas, but failed to find him. On his way up and then down the river, de Salazar stopped briefly at a bay in the left bank to resupply his ships. He found the natives friendly, and decided to found a fort there in August 1537. He named it Nuestra Señora Santa María de la Asunción (Our Lady Saint Mary of the Assumption – the Roman Catholic Church celebrates the Feast of the Assumption on 15 August). The relations between the Spanish settlers and the Guaraní shaped the city's early character. Through the cuñadazgo—a Guaraní institution by which caciques gave women to newcomers to seal alliances—and later through violent mass seizures of women known as the rancheadas, Asunción became the demographic and economic centre of the colony. The licentious life of the colonists led a priest to describe it in 1545 as the "paradise of Muhammad", a phrase that became one of the city's enduring historical epithets. The mestizo population that emerged from these unions gave rise to Paraguay's predominantly mixed-race society.

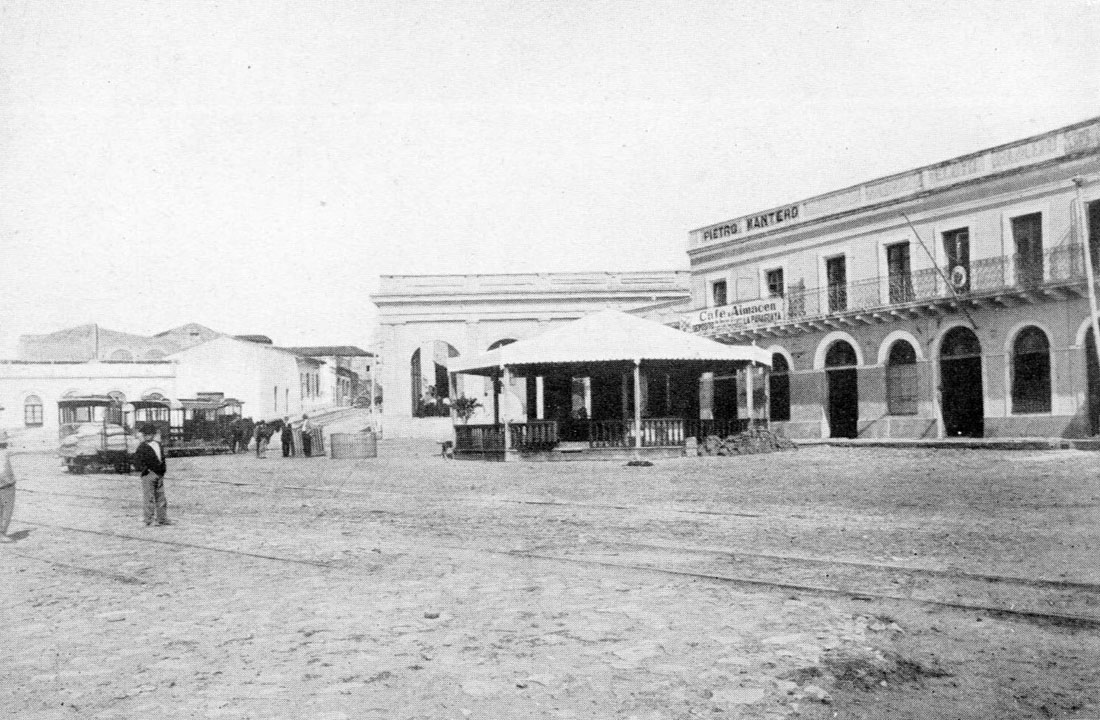
Asunción's Downtown in 1872

In 1542 natives destroyed Buenos Aires, and the Spaniards there fled to Asunción. Thus the city became the center of a large Spanish colonial province comprising part of Brazil, present-day Paraguay and northeastern Argentina. In 1603 Asunción was the seat of the First Synod of Asunción, which set guidelines for the evangelization of the natives in their lingua franca, Guaraní.

In 1731 an uprising under José de Antequera y Castro was one of the first rebellions against Spanish colonial rule. The uprising failed, but it was the first sign of the independent spirit that was growing among the criollos, mestizos and natives of Paraguay. The event influenced the independence of Paraguay, which subsequently materialized in 1811. The secret meetings between the independence leaders to plan an ambush against the Spanish Governor in Paraguay (Bernardo de Velasco) took place at the home of Juana María de Lara, in downtown Asunción. On the night of 14 and 15 May 1811, the rebels succeeded and forced governor Velasco to surrender. Today, Lara's former home, known as Casa de la Independencia (House of the Independence), operates as a museum and historical building.

=== Post-independence period ===
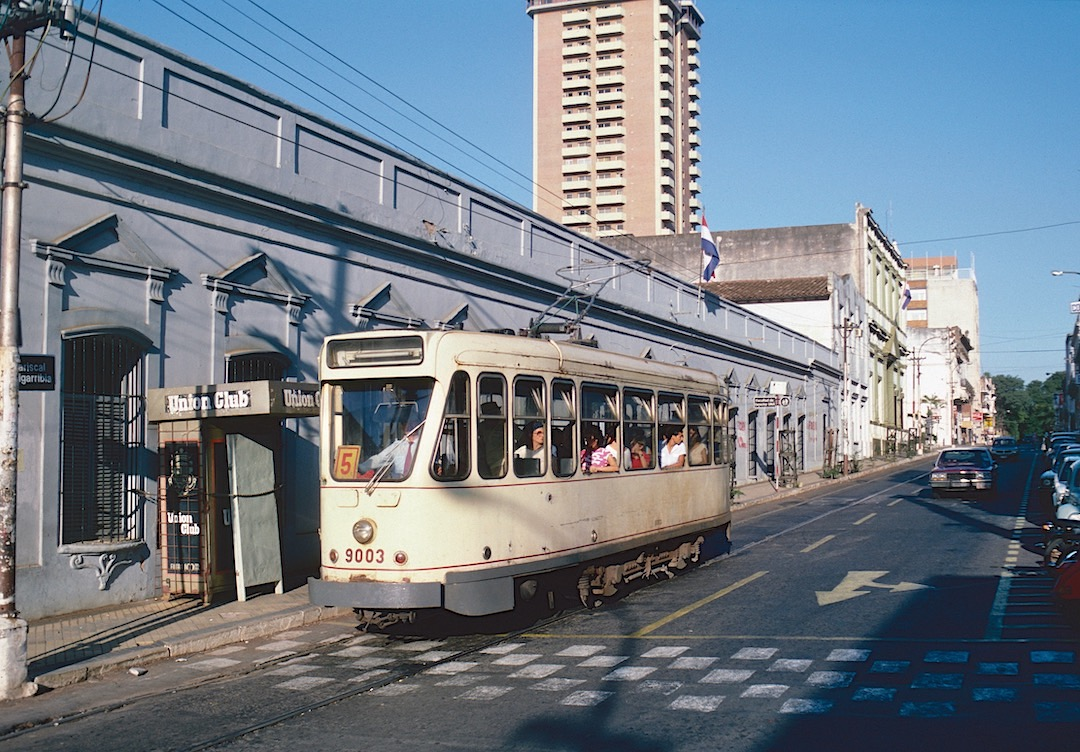
A tram in the city centre in 1986. The tram system closed in the late 1990s

After Paraguay became independent, significant change occurred in Asunción. Under the rule of Gaspar Rodríguez de Francia (in office 1813–1840) roads were built throughout the city and the streets were named. However, during the presidency of Carlos Antonio López (President 1844–1862) Asunción (and Paraguay) saw further progress as the new president implemented new economic policies. More than 400 schools, metallurgic factories and the first railroad service in South America were built during the López presidency. After López died in 1862, his son Francisco Solano López became the new president and led the country through the disastrous Paraguayan War that lasted for five years (1864–1870). On 1 January 1869, the capital city Asunción fell to Brazilian forces led by Gen. João de Souza da Fonseca Costa. After the end of the armed conflict, Brazilian troops occupied Asunción until 1876.

Many historians have claimed that this war provoked a steady downfall of the city and country, since it massacred two-thirds of the country's population. Progress slowed down greatly afterwards, and the economy stagnated.

After the Paraguayan War, Asunción began a slow attempt at recovery. Towards the end of the 19th century and during the early years of the 20th century, a flow of immigrants from Europe and the Ottoman Empire came to the city. This led to a change in the appearance of the city as many new buildings were built and Asunción went through an era more prosperous than any since the war.

A tramway in Asunción opened in 1871, initially using horse-drawn trams and steam-powered trams, with electric trams being introduced in 1913. The last tram service was discontinued around 1995, followed by formal closure in November 1997.

=== 20th century to the present ===
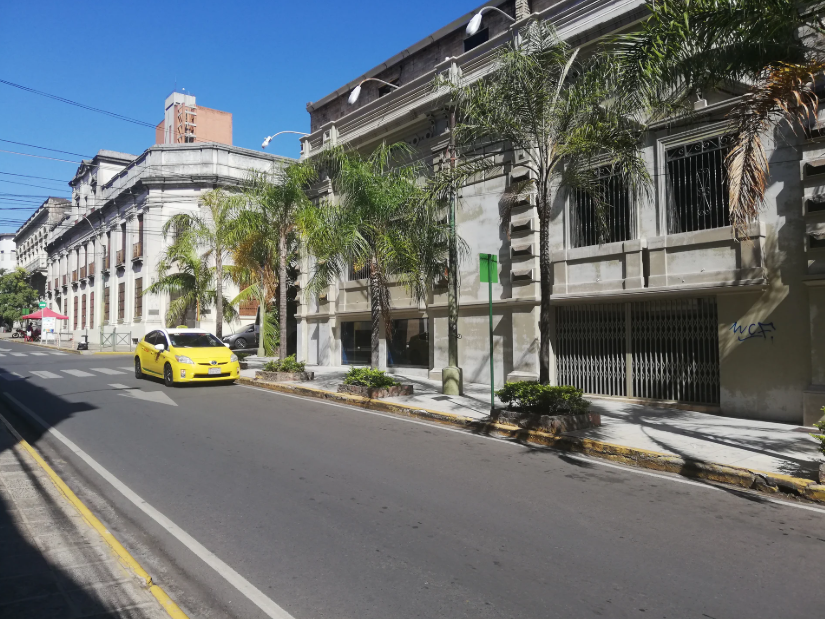
Calle Palma, in the old town

Between 1932 and 1935, Paraguay faced a war with Bolivia in the Chaco War and at that time Asunción became a place of relief and help for the wounded in the conflict. The Defensores del Chaco stadium located in the Sajonia neighborhood owes its name precisely to the fact that the army that would go to fight against the Bolivians in defense of the Chaco was recruited in this place.

Asunción has been the first completely urban city in Paraguay since approximately the middle of the 20th century. On the other hand, until the early 1980s, Asunción was the only city in Paraguay with more than 100,000 inhabitants, taking into account that the rural population has always predominated in Paraguay. At the end of the 1980s, the rural exodus began, contributing to the demographic increase —especially urban— of Central Department (part of current Greater Asunción). Consequently, the population of Asunción remained practically stagnant since then.

In March 1991, just two years after the coup d'état against the government of Alfredo Stroessner —which lasted almost 35 years— the Treaty of Asunción was signed with the presidents of Argentina, Brazil, Uruguay, and Paraguay. This treaty gave rise to the Southern Common Market (Mercosur), a regional integration organization.

Since 1993, Asunción has become an autonomous municipality administered as a capital district and is not formally integrated into any department. Before 1993, it managed the Central Department —although had not been part of it since 1973—. Later, Areguá —a city with a colonial feel— began to be the capital, and therefore, to administer the department until today.

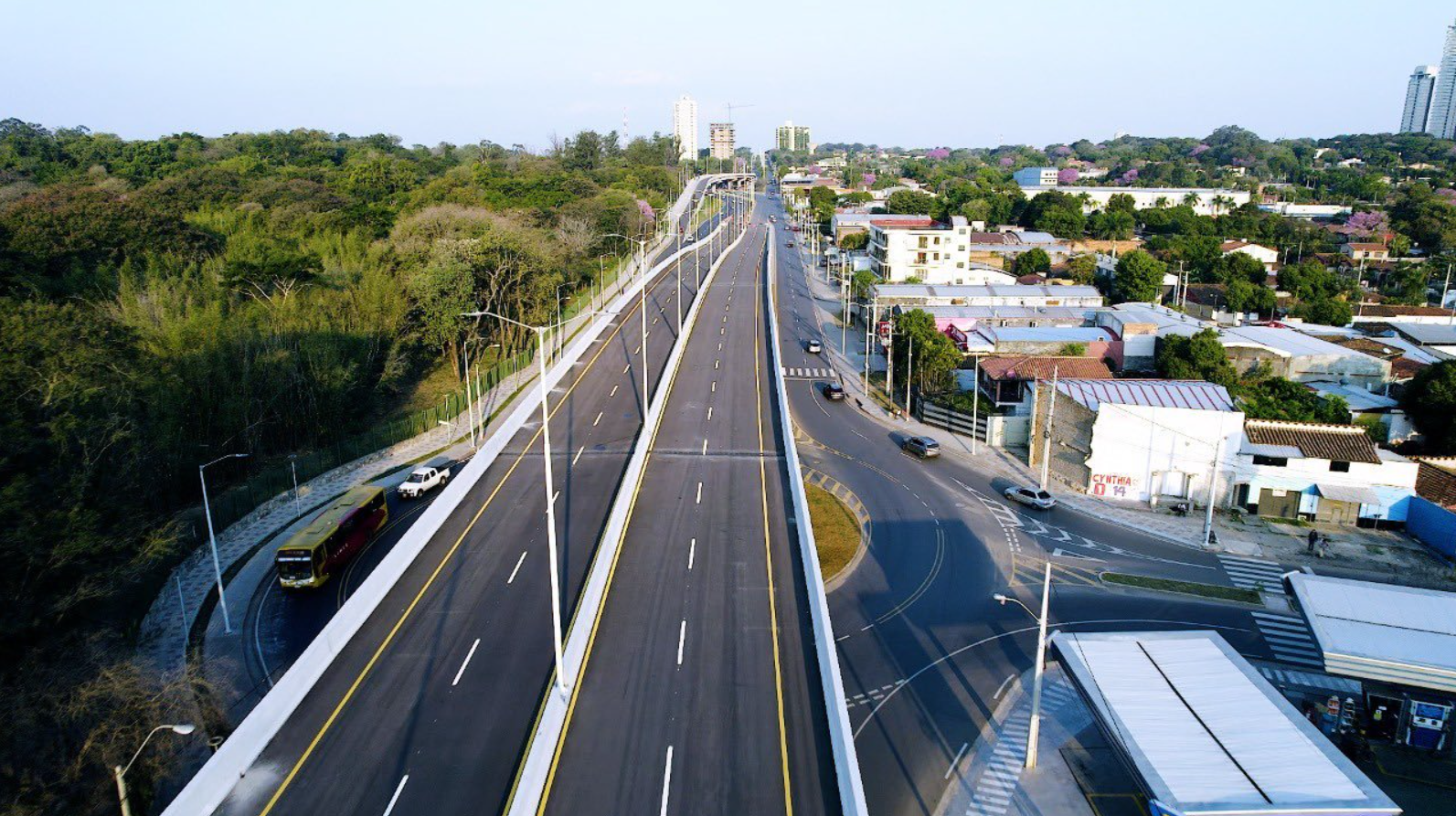
Road corridor of the Botanical Garden (left); on the right, the Jade Park towers are shown

In May 2000, the Congress building was attacked by tanks in the midst of a failed coup d'état, which led to the president declaring a state of exception at the national level. In August 2004, Asunción suffered the greatest tragedy in the history of the country, after the Chaco War, with the infamous blaze at Ycua Bolaños, a supermarket fire that claimed more than 400 lives, with three hundred more injured.

Due to the unbridled growth and lack of urban planning and infrastructure in the capital and its surrounding areas —in recent years—, Asunción is becoming a city with problems similar to the large metropolises of the world (e.g.: intense traffic during rush hours, insufficiency of services, among others). However, at the same time, there are dozens of investments in the city, making it one of the cities with the most economic growth in the region. To improve the transportation situation, several alternatives are planned, such as the metrobus or the electric train, among others. Also the construction of more viaducts and tunnels.

Likewise, Asunción has been the meeting point of the largest demonstrations in Paraguay, the most recent being the Paraguayan March of 1999 (in which 8 protesters were shot dead, causing the resignation of then-president Cubas), the impeachment of President Lugo in 2012 (which caused the suspension of Paraguay in Mercosur), or the political crisis of 2017 (protesters set fire to the Congress building), among others.

== Geography ==
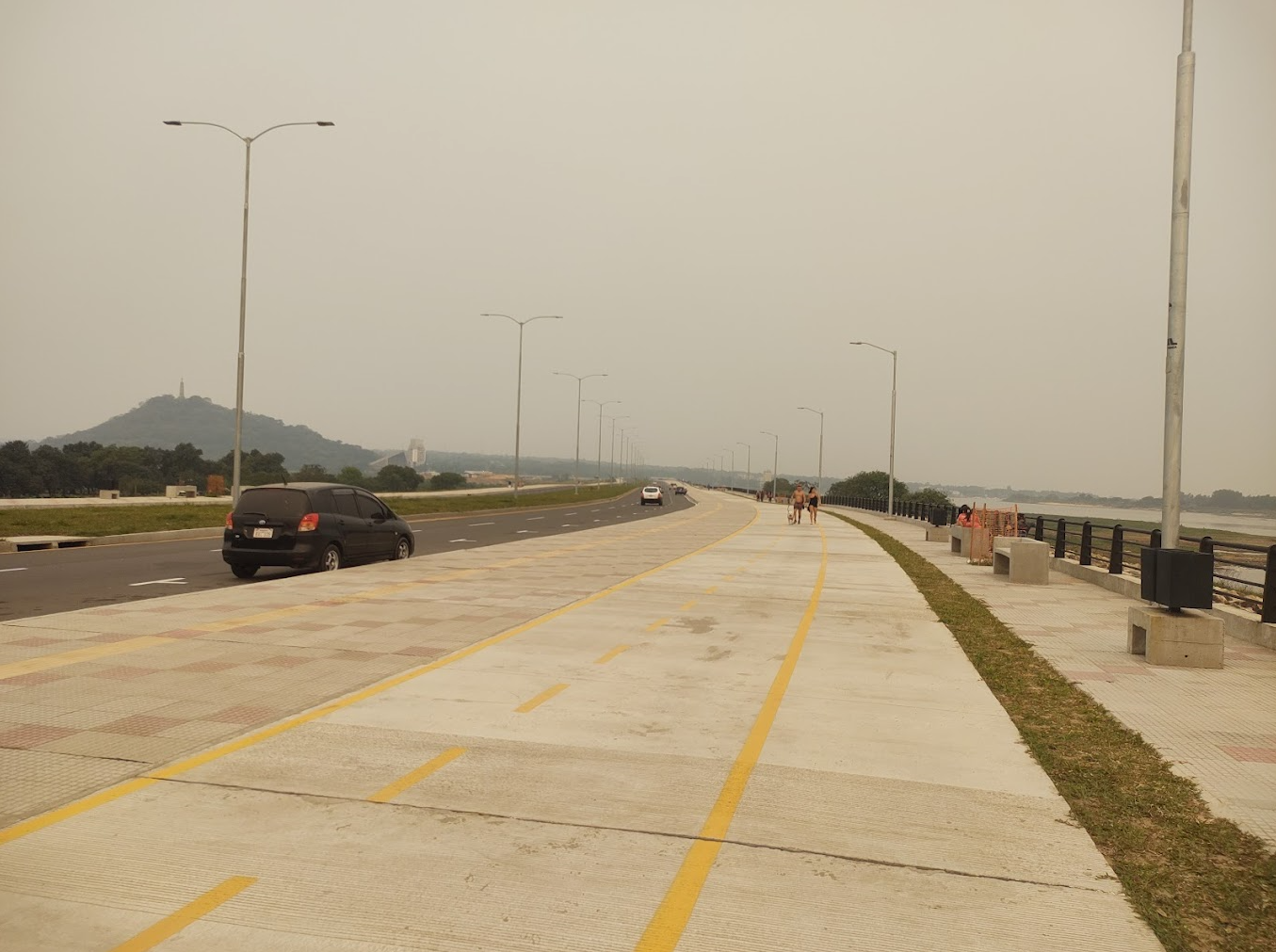
Lambaré Hill with the Costanera Sur.

Being at the Argentina–Paraguay border, Asunción is located between the parallels 25° 15' and 25° 20' of south latitude and between the meridians 57° 40' and 57° 30' of west longitude. The city sits on the left bank of the Paraguay River, almost at the confluence of this river with the River Pilcomayo. The Paraguay River and the Bay of Asunción in the northwest separate the city from the Occidental Region of Paraguay and Argentina in the south part of the city. The rest of the city is surrounded by the Central Department.

The Paraguay River is the most important hydrographic body of the city since river commerce develops through it, and it is also a tourist attraction. Asunción Bay is separated from the great Paraguay River by the San Miguel Bank, a narrow lowland peninsula where two geographical and ecological regions of Paraguay converge: the Humid Chaco and the Alto Paraná Atlantic forests. Some important bodies of water are the Pozo Colorado, De Los Patos, Ycuá Satí, and Jaén streams. All of these run hidden under the pavement of Asunción and flow into the river.

The orography of the city is characterized by being irregular, partly because of "the seven hills" that could be seen from the river upon reaching the city. The old town sits on a hill and preserves the characteristic plan of the towns of the colonial era, while the Church of La Encarnación is actually located at the highest point in the downtown. One of the highest and most characteristic points of the city is Cerro Lambaré, at 160 meters (520 ft) meters above sea level; however, strictly speaking, the highest point in Asunción is Colina Alta Street, in the Nazareth neighborhood, at 170 meters (560 ft) meters above sea level (located near the Copetrol station on República Argentina Avenue).

The 7 hills of Asunción are:

- Loma Cabará, the founding area of Asunción.
- Loma San Jerónimo, where there was once a hermitage dedicated to said saint.
- Loma Clavel, where the Marine Infantry barracks are currently located.
- Loma Cachinga, where the Hospital de Clínicas is currently located.
- Loma del Mangrullo, where Carlos Antonio López Park is currently located.
- Loma de la Encarnación, where the Church of the Encarnación is currently located.
- Loma de las Piedras de Santa Catalina, where the Escalinata Antequera is currently located.

Another important elevation was Mount Tacumbú, but in the 1950s began its exploitation in order to pave the streets of Asunción. Today only a lagoon remains as a result of the impossibility of suctioning the waters by the rocks that were left there. The quarry stopped working due to the urbanization of the area. Its current height is 91 meters (299 ft).

=== Biogeography ===
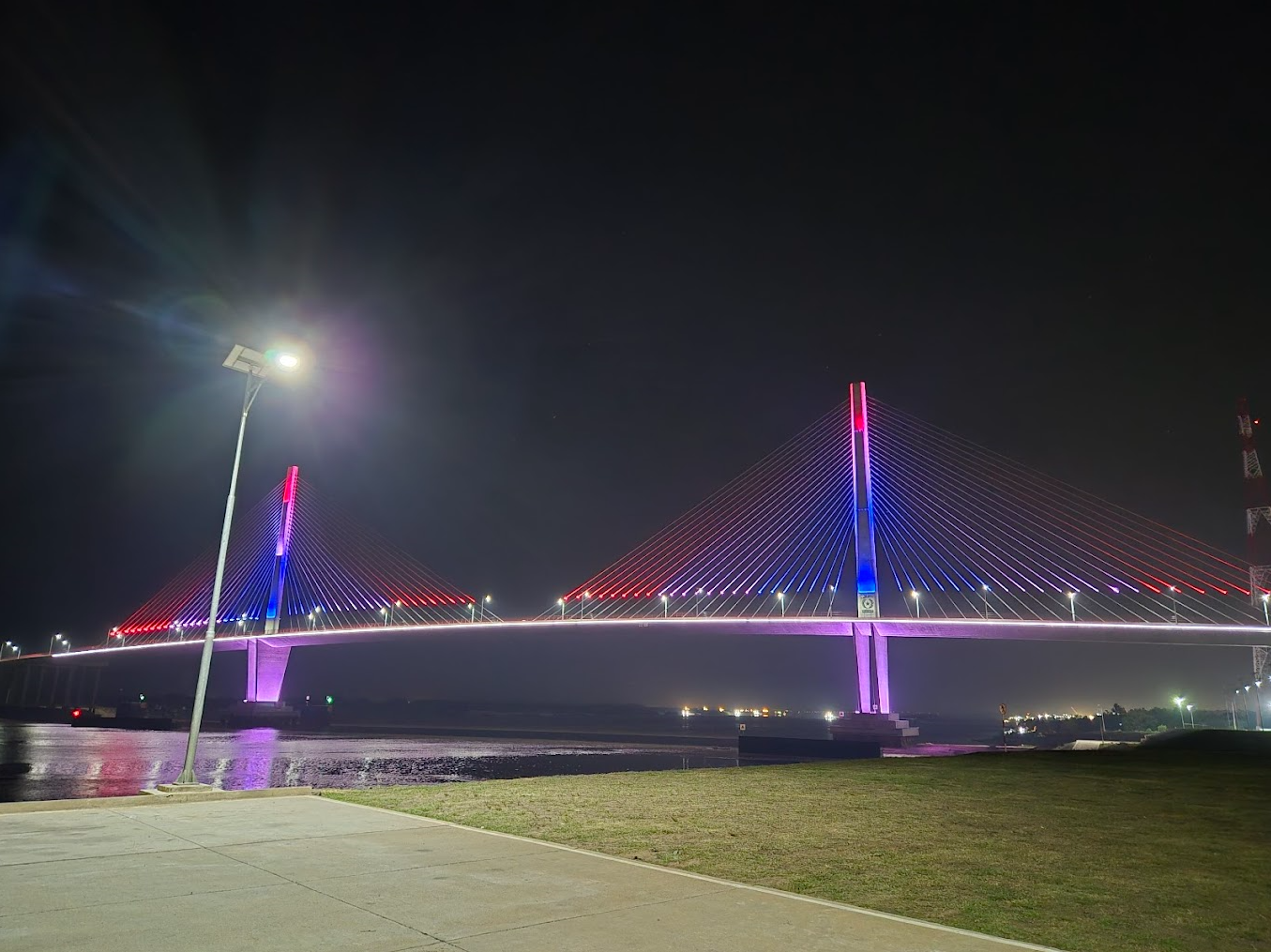
Héroes del Chaco Bridge over the Paraguay River, which connects Asunción with Nueva Asunción

Asunción has two main biogeographical areas: the interior area and the bay area. The interior area was once covered with lush forests that made up part of the Humid Chaco, containing trees that often exceeded 40 meters (130 ft) in height. Among the common plant species found here are the tree fern or chachi, the pink lapacho (Tabebuia heptaphylla), the yvyra pytä (Peltophorum dubium), the guatambú or yvyra ñeti (Balfourodendron riedelianum), and the cedar or ygary (Cedrela fissilis).

Large animals that once lived in the area that is currently Asunción were the jaguar (Panthera onca), the tapir (Tapirus terrestris), the harpy eagle (Harpia harpyja), and the capuchin monkey (Cebus apella). The last remnants of this great ecosystem can be seen in the Botanical Garden and Zoo of Asunción and in the surroundings of Cerro Lambare; medium and small animals that can still be found here include the toco toucan (Ramphastos toco), the gold tegu (Tupinambis teguixin), the opossum (Didelphis albiventris), the Paraguayan magpie (Cyanocorax chrysops), and the masakaragua'i or cucucucha (Troglodytes aedon). Small birds—such as the cardinal (Paroaria coronata), the turtle dove (Zenaida meloda), the chingolo or cachilito (Zonotrichia capensis), the golden goldfinch (Sicalis flaveola), and the saijovy or common celestine (Thraupis sayaca)—coexist in the densely populated areas of the city along with the domestic pigeon—an invasive species that is reproducing at an accelerated rate, causing damage to the facades of buildings and in some cases displacing the local birdlife.

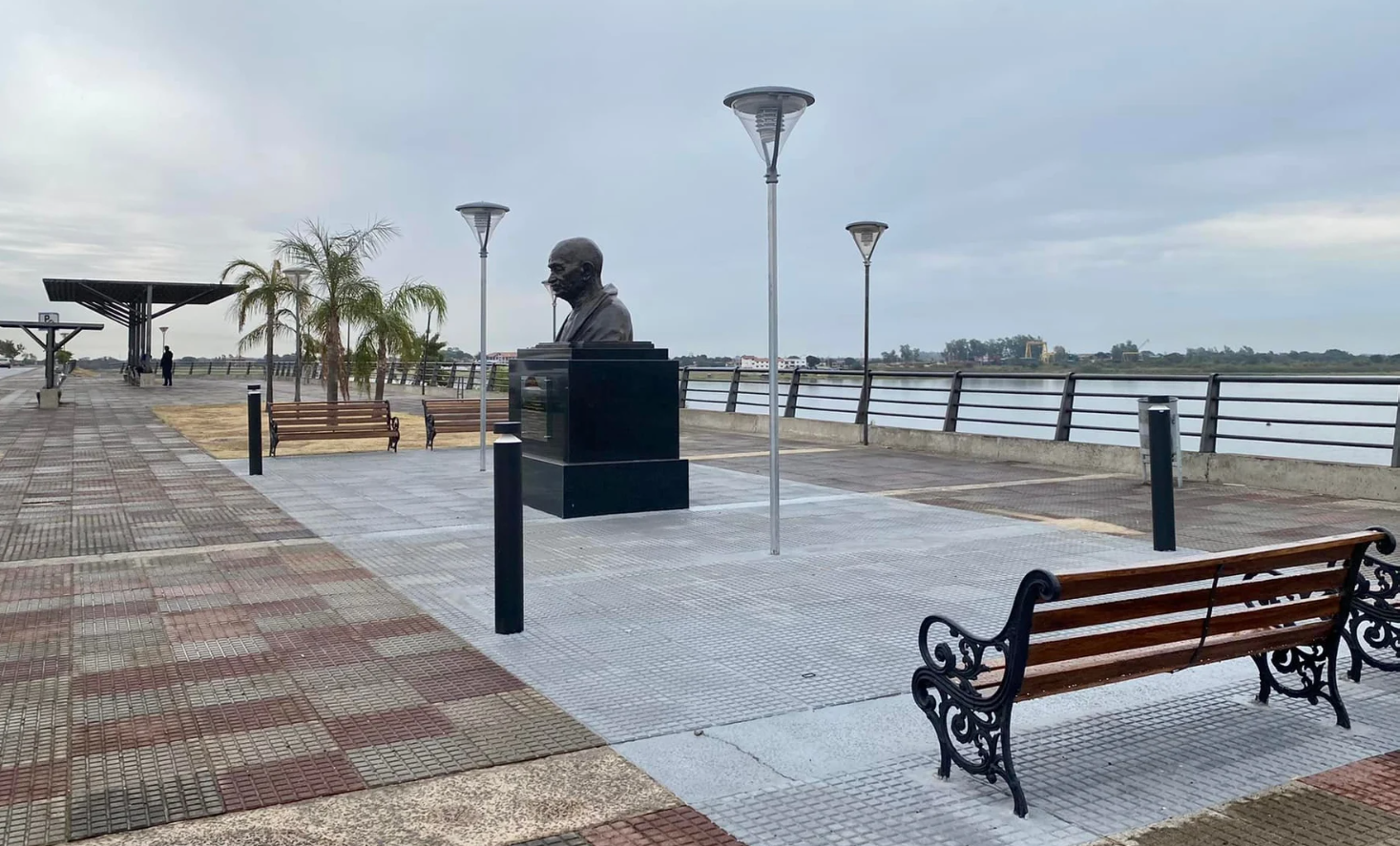
Bust of Gandhi on the banks of the Paraguay River

The bay area has an approximate area of 375 hectares (930 acres) and is located just 2 km (1.2 mi) from the old town. It is one of the most important stopping places during the journey of Nearctic and Southern migratory birds. Asunción Bay has a wide variety of habitats, yet their availability changes throughout the year due to large seasonal fluctuations in the water level of the Paraguay River, which make the depth and extent of bay flooding vary considerably. During the southern winter, when the water is abundantly high, the bay is largely underwater, but towards the end of the season when the water level drops, sandy and clay beaches (tidal marsh) appear. If the waters continue to recede, most of the marshes dry out and become grasslands, some of which remain wet. A total of 258 bird species have been recorded, including 7 globally endangered species and 28 species that nest in North America and migrate to southern South America. More than 3% of the global population of one of them, the cinnamon sandpiper (Tryngites subruficollis), passes through the bay during its migration to the south, turning Asunción Bay into an Important Bird Area (IBA).

=== Climate ===
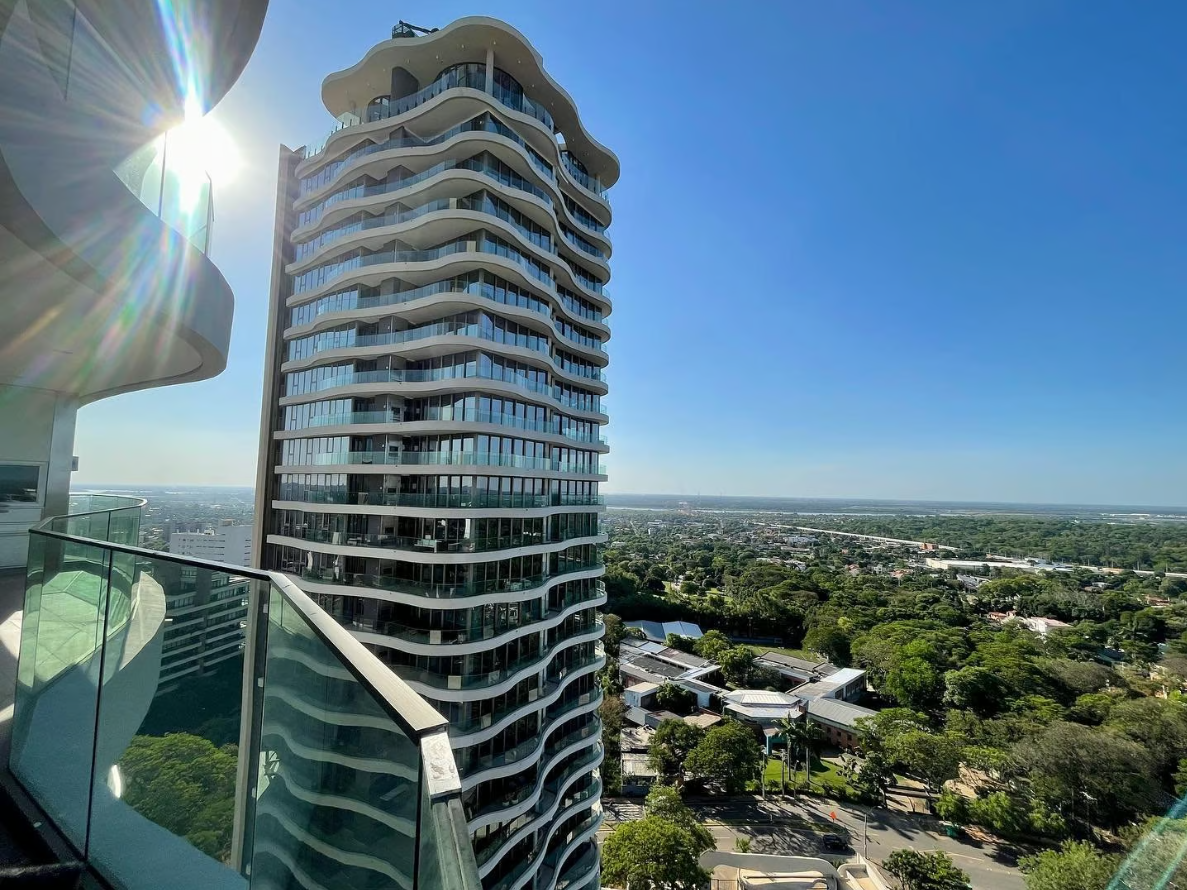
View of the city's greenery from Jade Park

Asunción features a humid subtropical climate (Köppen: Cfa, Trewartha: Cfhl) characterized by very hot, humid summers (average of 28 °C or 82 °F in January) and mild winters (average of 17 °C; 63 °F in July). Relative humidity is high throughout the year, so the heat index is higher than the true air temperature in the summer, and in the winter it can feel cooler. The average annual temperature is 23 °C (73 °F). The average annual precipitation is high, with 1,400 millimeters (55 in) distributed in over 80 days yearly. The highest recorded temperature was 43.0 °C (109.4 °F) on 17 October 2023, while the lowest recorded temperature was −1.2 °C (29.8 °F) on 27 June 2011. The highest rainfall accumulation within 24 hours was 222 mm (8.74 in) on 26 February 2014.

Summers are very hot and humid, with temperatures that can eventually exceed 40 °C (104 °F), due to ambient humidity. The average temperature in January is 28 °C (82 °F). Hours of sunshine abound, as do isolated showers and short summer storms. In Asunción itself, the heat is even more accentuated than in the surrounding area, due to the urban heat island effect. The warm north wind that blows from Brazil is the predominant one in the season, although sometimes winds from the south bring more pleasant precipitation and temperatures.

Winters are mild and quite irregular because throughout the season there can be cold days —minimums around 0 °C (32 °F)— as well as quite warm days —maximums around 30 °C (86 °F)—. Generally, a typical winter day includes mild afternoons, as well as cool mornings and evenings. The average temperature in winter is 17 °C (63 °F). Ground frost may usually occur throughout the season, especially in the suburban and rural areas of Greater Asunción. The fresh south wind that blows from Argentina is the predominant one in the season, although sometimes winds from the north bring warmer temperatures.

Snow is unknown in modern times, but it fell during the Little Ice Age, the last time being in June 1751. Precipitation is abundant throughout the year, as storms or showers usually develop quite frequently; except for the winter months, when weak but continuous drizzles are more common. The relative humidity in the environment remains high all year round (averaging 70%).

Asunción generally has a very short dry season between May and September, but the coldest months are June, July and August. During the wet season, Asunción is generally hot and humid though towards the end of this season, it becomes noticeably cooler. In contrast, Asunción's dry season is pleasantly mild. Asunción's annual precipitation values observe a summer maximum, due to severe subtropical summer thunderstorms which travel southward from northern Paraguay, originating in the Gran Chaco region of the northwestern part of the country. The wettest and driest months of the year are April and July, on average receiving respectively 166 and 39 mm (6.54 and 1.54 in) of precipitation.

Climate data for Asunción (1991–2020, extremes 1940–present)
Month	Jan	Feb	Mar	Apr	May	Jun	Jul	Aug	Sep	Oct	Nov	Dec	Year
Record high °C (°F)	42.2 (108.0)	40.8 (105.4)	41.6 (106.9)	37.8 (100.0)	35.4 (95.7)	33.6 (92.5)	35.6 (96.1)	39.4 (102.9)	42.2 (108.0)	43.0 (109.4)	41.2 (106.2)	41.7 (107.1)	43.0 (109.4)
Mean daily maximum °C (°F)	34.0 (93.2)	33.0 (91.4)	31.9 (89.4)	29.2 (84.6)	24.9 (76.8)	23.5 (74.3)	21.9 (71.4)	26.2 (79.2)	27.9 (82.2)	30.1 (86.2)	31.2 (88.2)	32.8 (91.0)	29.0 (84.2)
Daily mean °C (°F)	28.0 (82.4)	26.9 (80.4)	25.9 (78.6)	23.2 (73.8)	19.4 (66.9)	18.3 (64.9)	17.1 (62.8)	19.6 (67.3)	21.5 (70.7)	24.1 (75.4)	25.2 (77.4)	26.9 (80.4)	23.0 (73.4)
Mean daily minimum °C (°F)	23.1 (73.6)	22.5 (72.5)	21.5 (70.7)	18.9 (66.0)	15.5 (59.9)	14.2 (57.6)	13.6 (56.5)	14.6 (58.3)	16.5 (61.7)	19.5 (67.1)	20.3 (68.5)	22.2 (72.0)	18.5 (65.3)
Record low °C (°F)	10.0 (50.0)	11.4 (52.5)	7.5 (45.5)	4.4 (39.9)	0.2 (32.4)	−2.2 (28.0)	−3.0 (26.6)	−1.2 (29.8)	0.0 (32.0)	5.4 (41.7)	6.5 (43.7)	8.5 (47.3)	−3.0 (26.6)
Average precipitation mm (inches)	132.6 (5.22)	146.4 (5.76)	131.3 (5.17)	151.7 (5.97)	134.1 (5.28)	70.7 (2.78)	48.2 (1.90)	38.7 (1.52)	79.2 (3.12)	157.9 (6.22)	195.0 (7.68)	176.5 (6.95)	1,462.3 (57.57)
Average precipitation days (≥ 1.0 mm)	8	7	7	8	7	7	4	5	6	8	8	8	83
Average relative humidity (%)	68	71	72	75	76	76	70	70	66	67	67	68	70
Mean monthly sunshine hours	276	246	254	228	205	165	195	223	204	242	270	295	2,803
Source 1: World Meteorological Organization (precipitation days 1971–2000) NOAA (extremes)
Source 2: NOAA updated to 9/2012 (humidity, record 1961–1990), Danish Meteorological Institute (sun only)

== Government ==
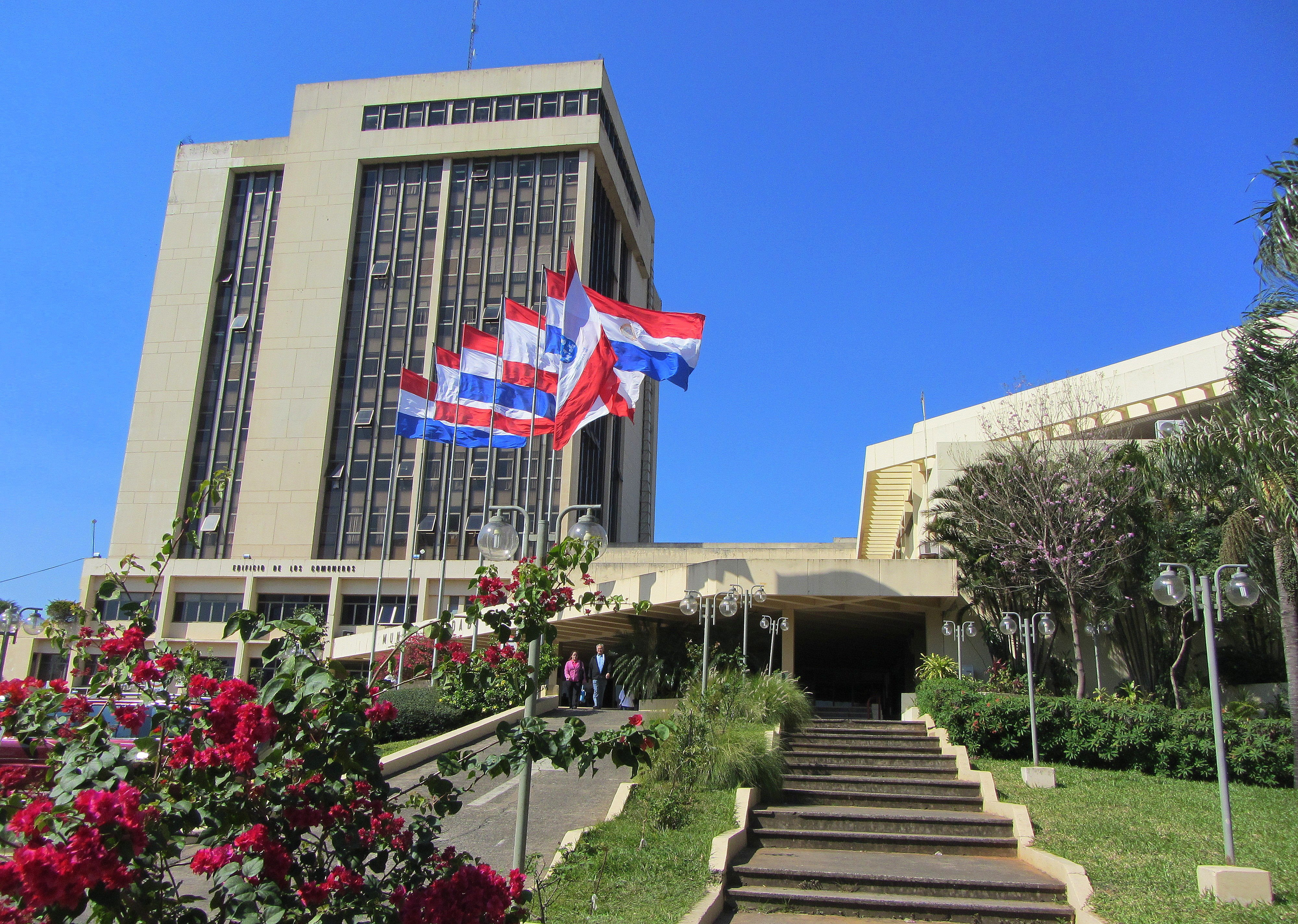
Headquarters of the Municipality of Asunción in the neighborhood Villa Aurelia

The Municipal Government is exercised by the Municipal Board and the Municipal Intendance, in accordance with the provisions of Article 20 of the Municipal Organic Law (MOL). Those who make up the mayor's office are the Intendant and the administrative departments of the municipality. The Mayor is the general administrator of the district, who is elected directly by the citizens to operate for a period of 5 years, while The councillor integrated into the municipal board last 5 years in their functions, with the possibility of being re-elected, and whose function is limited to that of a deliberative and legislative body of the government municipal. According to article 24 of the aforementioned law, the number of councilors that a municipality requires varies according to the budget amount that the State issues to the jurisdiction.

The city is governed by the municipality in similar instances to the national level: the Mayor would be equivalent to an executive body, and the Municipal Board a legislative and regulatory body. The municipal board is responsible for issuing laws or ordinances, which are municipal legal regulations whose mandatory force applies within the limits of the district. There are three types of government acts that give rise to the dynamics of municipal functioning: Ordinance, Regulation and Resolution municipal.

The ordinances are general regulations for the community, sanctioned by the Board and promulgated by the Municipality, and serve to establish rights, obligations and prohibitions for the inhabitants of the district and for the inhabitants of the country who for some reason are in the jurisdiction. The initiative of the ordinance projects is agreed upon by the members of the Board, the Intendant, and the citizens by popular initiative. They have the force of local law, that is, within the municipality, but they must comply with the law dictated by the National Congress. The regulations are general internal rules issued by the Board or the Intendant and serve to organize the administrative divisions of the municipality. Resolutions are rules applied to specific or particular cases, whether to a specific individual or group, and can be issued either by the Board or the Intendant.

Asunción is an autonomous municipality administered as capital district and is not formally integrated into any departments, so in addition to bringing together the three powers of the nation, it also has its own Judicial District and its own municipal police, apart from the traffic police.

=== Municipal mayors ===
Government Designations of Asunción (since 1960)
Period	Name	Designation	Political affiliation
1961	Marcos Arellano Elizeche	Designated Intendant	NRA
1961–1964	César Gagliardone	Designated Intendant	NRA
1964–1972	Manuel Brítez Borges	Designated Intendant	NRA
1972–1976	Guido Kunzle	Designated Intendant	NRA
1976–1989	Porfirio Pereira Ruiz Díaz	Designated Intendant	NRA
1989–1991	José Alder Ibáñez	Designated Intendant	NRA
1991–1996	Carlos Filizzola	Elected Intendant	Asunción Para Todos
1996–2001	Martín Burt	Elected Intendant	ARLP
2001–2006	Enrique Riera Escudero	Elected Intendant	NRA
2006–2010	Evanhy de Gallegos	Elected Intendant	NRA
2010	Hugo Piccinini	Acting Intendant	NRA
2010–2015	Arnaldo Samaniego	Elected Intendant	NRA
2015	Omar Pico Insfrán	Acting Intendant	NRA
2015–2019	Mario Ferreiro	Elected Intendant	RFP
2019–2021	Oscar Rodríguez	Acting Intendant	NRA
2021	César Ojeda	Acting Intendant	NRA
2021–2025	Óscar Rodríguez	Elected Intendant	NRA
2025–2026	Luis Bello	Acting Intendant	NRA

== Economy ==
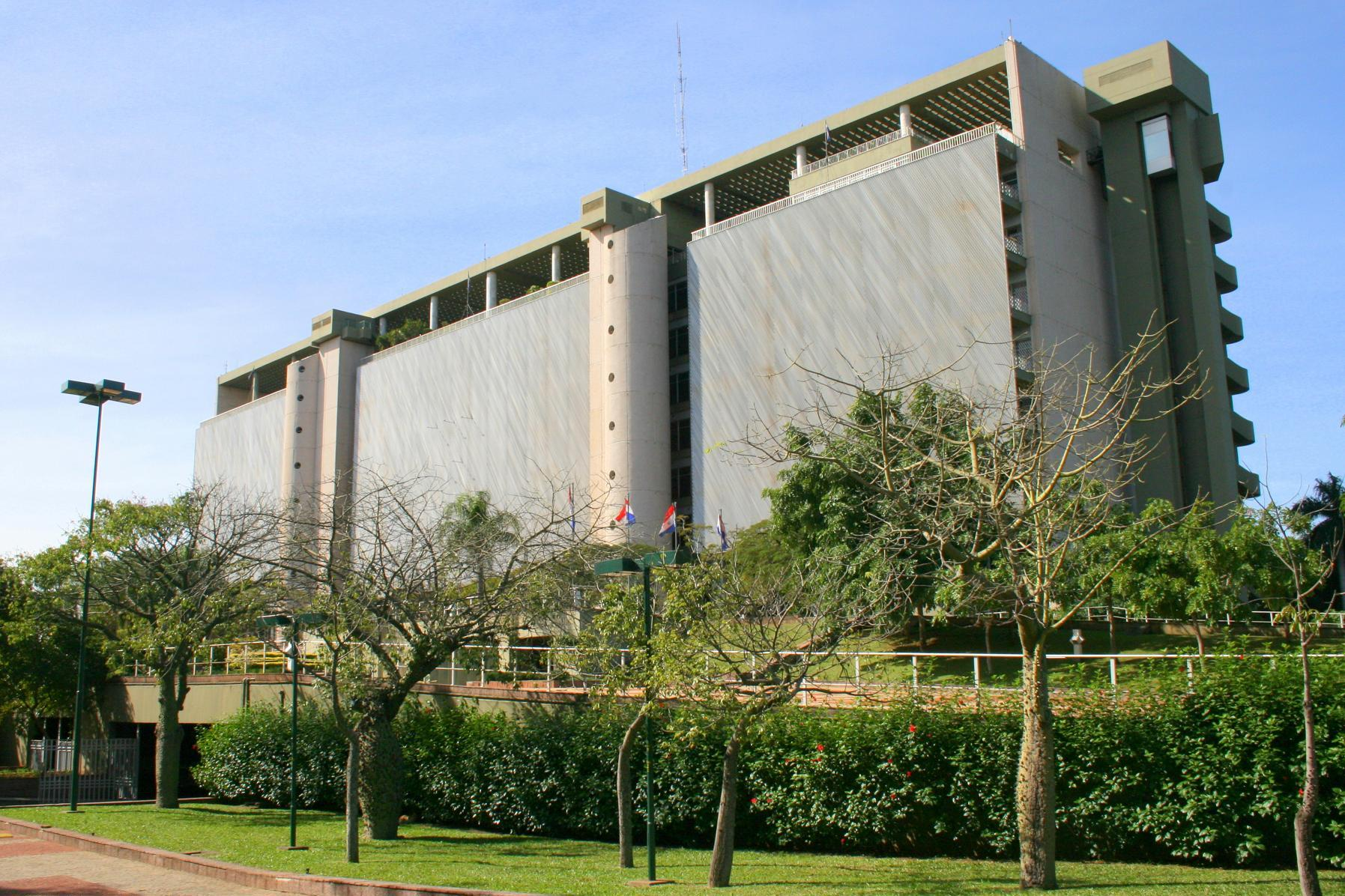
Central Bank of Paraguay

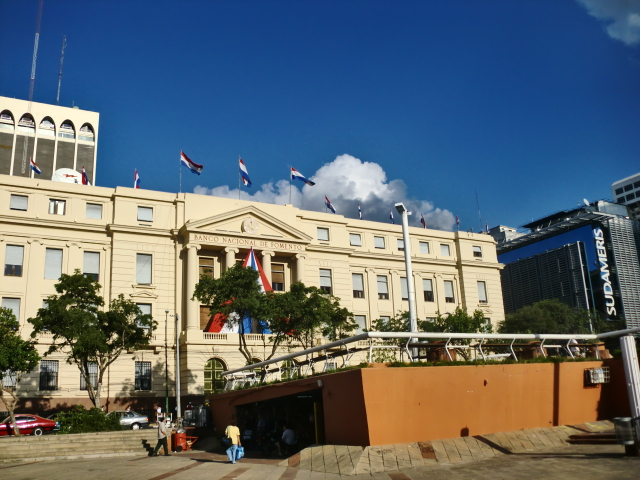
National Development Bank

The economic development of the country is reflected in the city by how in recent years construction (infrastructure) has grown rapidly due to the great demand for foreign investment. In addition, Asunción ranks sixth as the most profitable city in Latin America. The most important Paraguayan companies, businesses, and investment groups have their headquarters in Asunción. Commerce has expanded considerably in recent years stretching towards the suburbs where shopping malls and supermarkets have been built. Paraguay's only stock exchange, the BVPASA, is located here. The city is the economic center of Paraguay, followed by Ciudad del Este and Encarnación.

The attractiveness of the city has been attributed to its lax tax policies. Asunción has unrestrained taxes on the investments and movements of capital. There is also no income tax for investors in Bonds of Asunción Stock Exchange. According to experts, Paraguay is tapped as one of the top three countries with the best investment climate in Latin America and the Caribbean. As well it remains the most attractive nation in the hemisphere in doing business and is equipped with a series of laws that protect strategic investments and guarantee a friendly environment for the development of large industrial plants and infrastructure projects

The distribution of the economically active population varies according to the economic sectors. Actually indicates that the population fundamentally participates in the tertiary sector (commerce and services), employing 8 out of every 10 individuals. The secondary sector (industry and construction) concentrates 16% of the economically active, while participation in the primary sector (agriculture and livestock) is practically zero since Asunción is a strictly urban area. Regarding commerce, it should be pointed out that this sector has developed considerably in recent years, moving from the old town to residential neighborhoods, where shopping malls, shopping centers, and commercial promenades are spread. This trend is still increasing.

Important international banks have their headquarters in the capital, among them are Citibank, Itau Bank, GNB, BBVA, etc. Among the Paraguayan capital banks located in the capital, the most notorious examples are Ueno Bank, the National Development Bank, the Family Bank, the Amambay Bank, the Regional Bank,, etc.

At the same time, the Central Bank of Paraguay has its headquarters in this city. Its mission is to preserve and ensure the stability and value of the currency, promote the effectiveness and stability of the financial system, and fulfill its role as a bank of banks and financial agent of the State. To this end, it has various powers in monetary, financial, credit, and international exchange matters.

According to the 2022 Cost of Living ranking prepared by ECA International, the price of products and services in about 200 cities around the world was compared. The study revealed that Asunción is the third cheapest city in Latin America for a foreigner.

=== Real estate growth and expansion ===
Regional Real Estate focuses on Asunción due to low inflation, exchange rate stability, high rental income, and lower taxes. Between 2015 and 2020, real estate developments demanded an investment of more than US$1 billion, and the place in Asunción where this impact received the most was on Aviadores del Chaco Avenue and Santa Teresa Avenue.

Much of this achievement was due to the change in customs that citizens have been presenting, in relation to the fact that many owners changed their way of living and are more demanding with comfort, especially with technology, which enhances the possibility of moving to apartments to acquire comfort, location, security, price, quality, among other issues. Another factor is that Paraguay in recent years has noticed the rise in the purchasing power of the middle and upper-middle classes (young professionals, with an average age of 35 years), and this situation has led them to search and buy a home in the departments, to work in the offices that were opened from 2014 to the present.

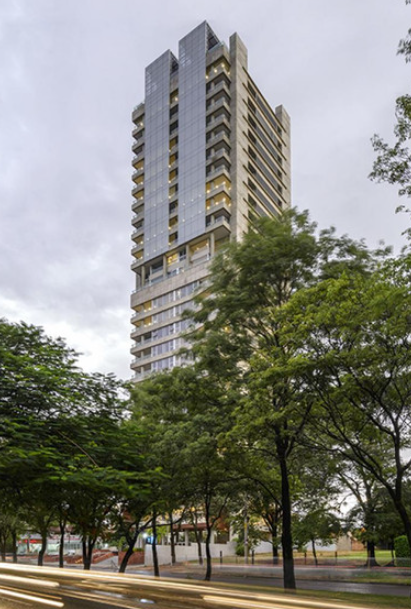
Miranda Tower

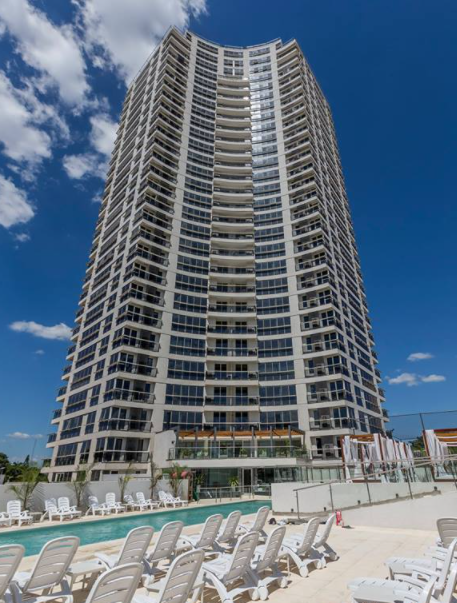
The Tower

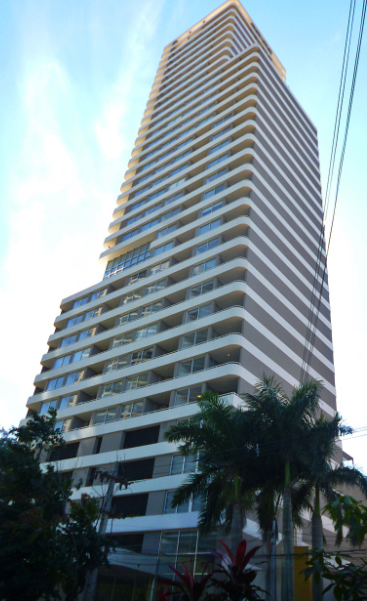
Sky Tower

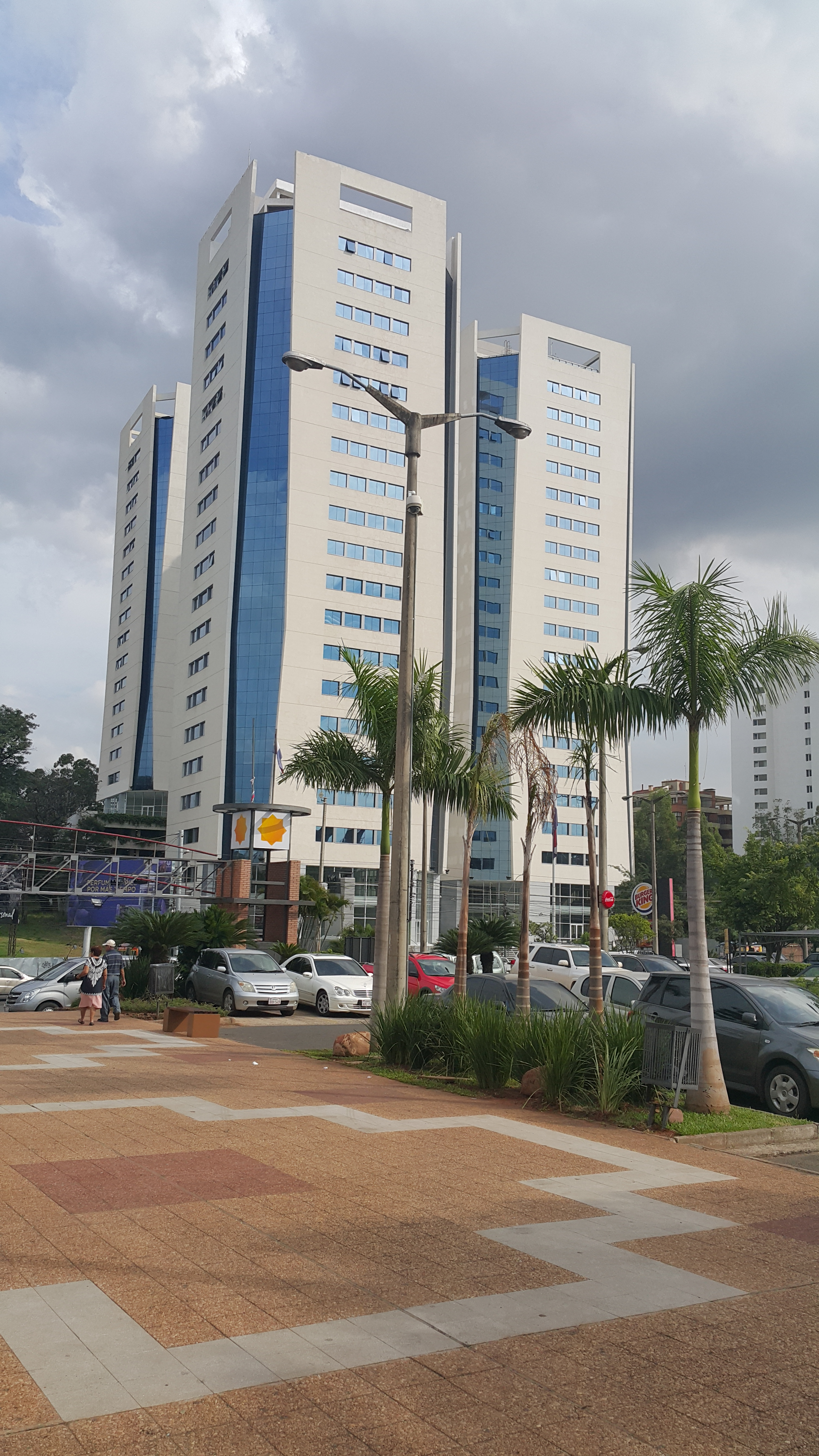
World Trade Center Asunción

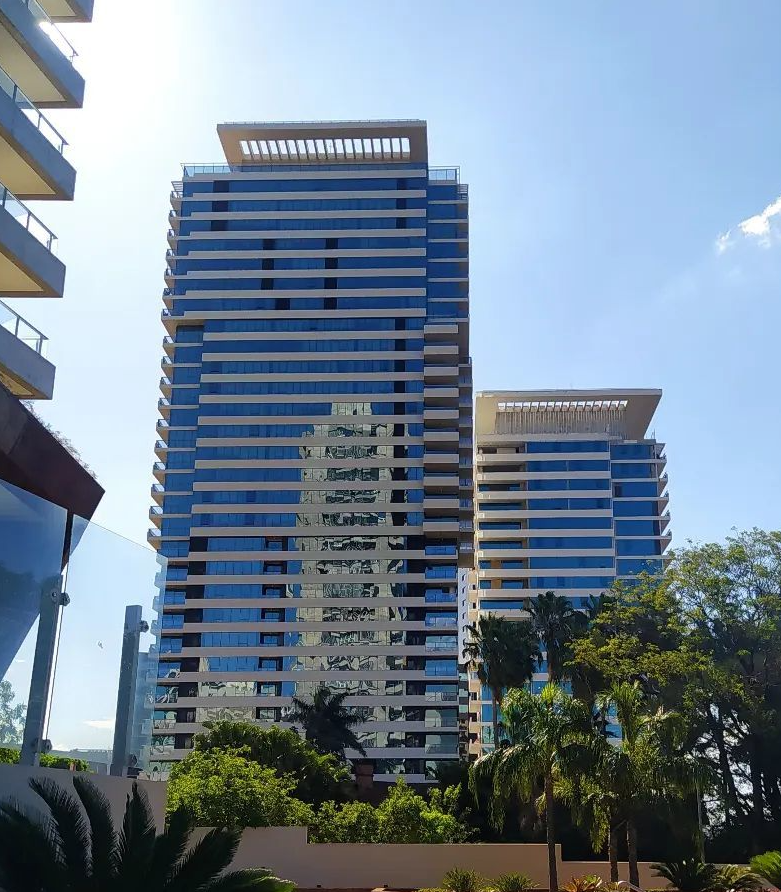
Eminent Towers

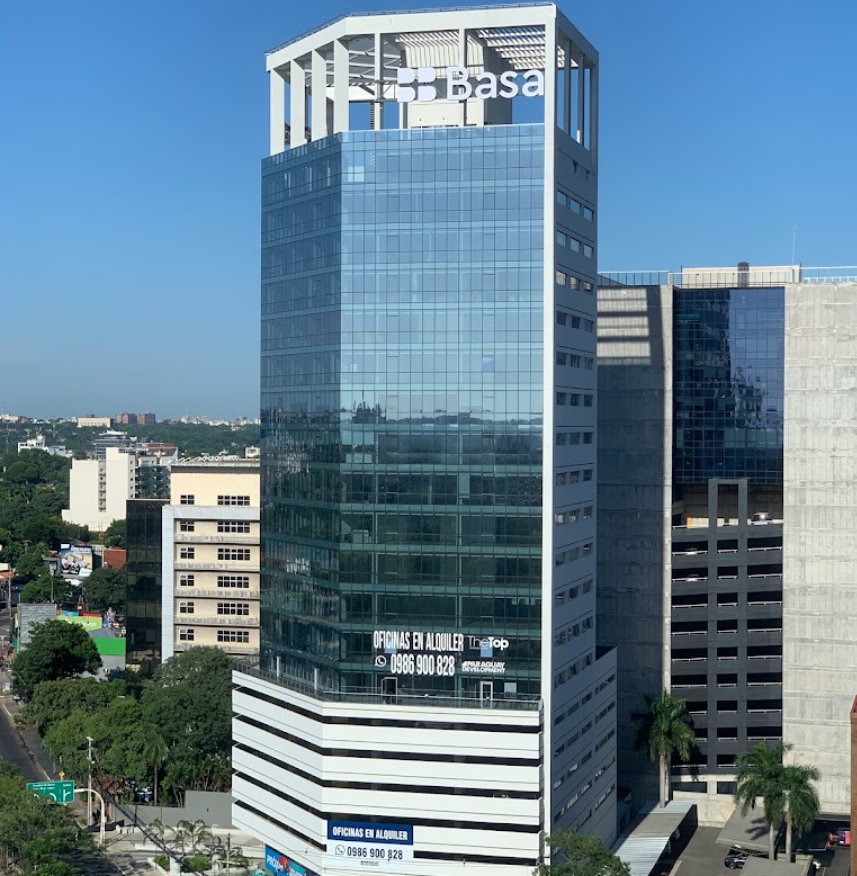
The Top

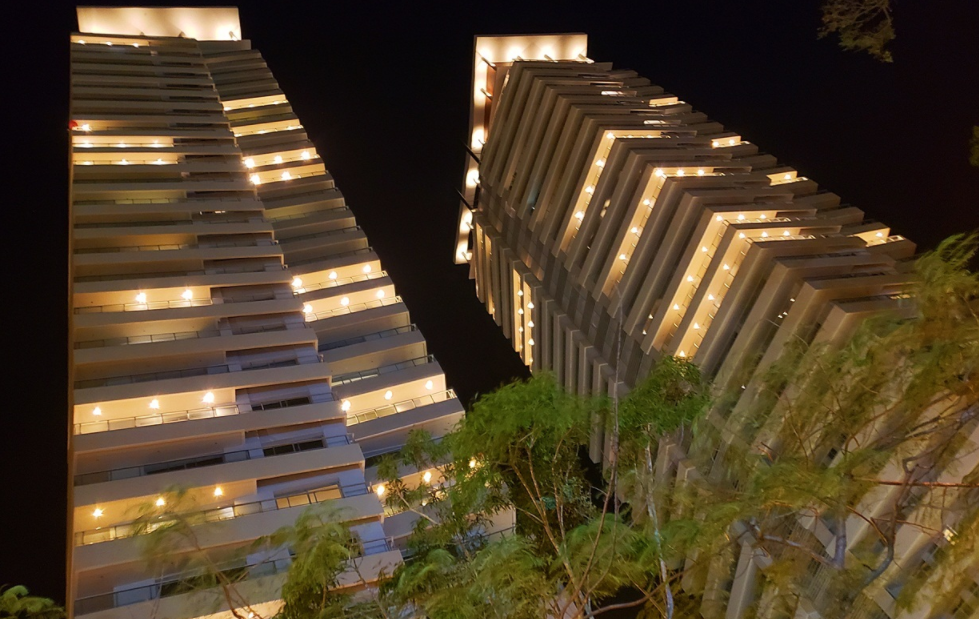
Palacio de los Patos

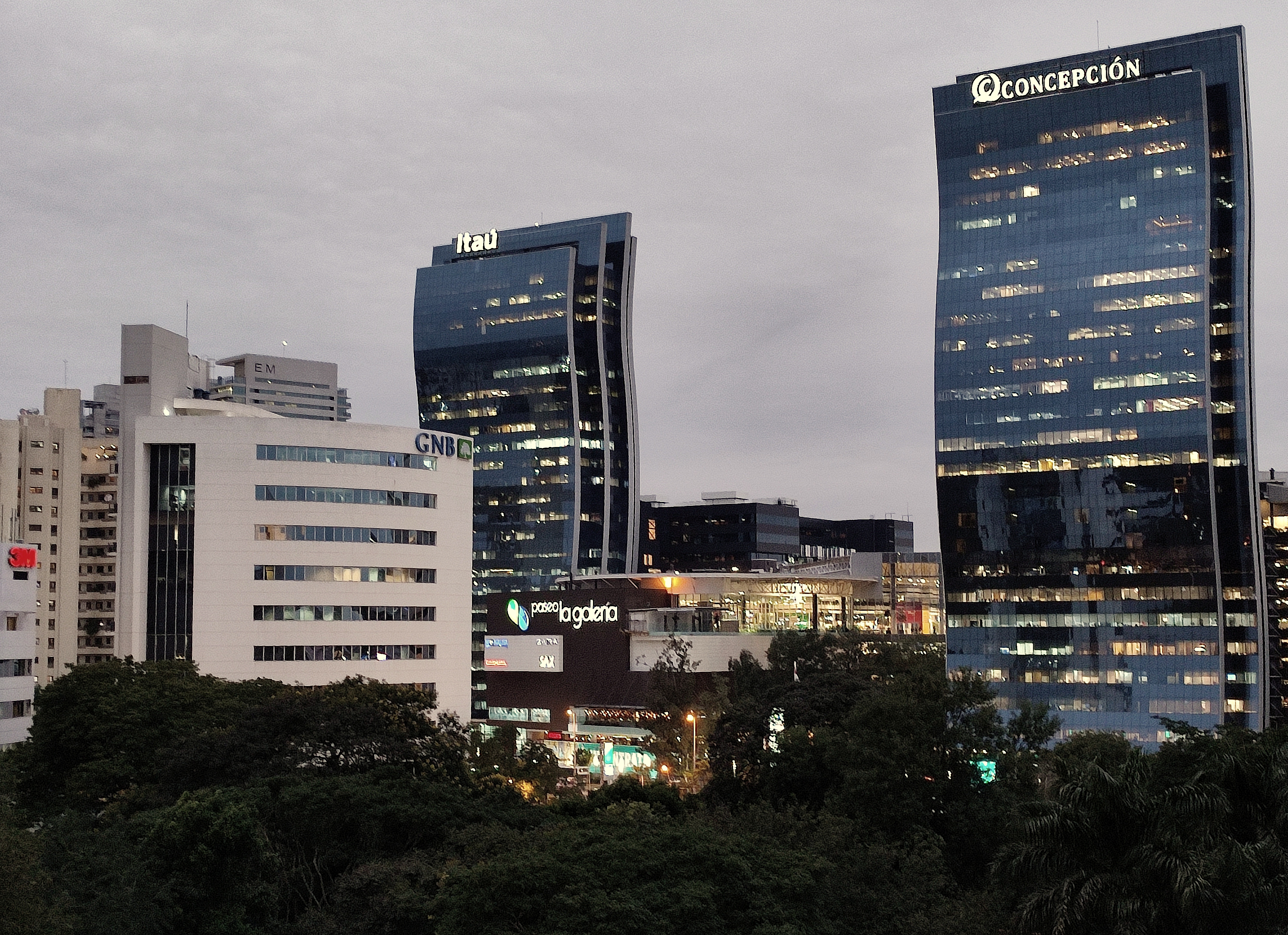
Paseo La Galería

== Education ==
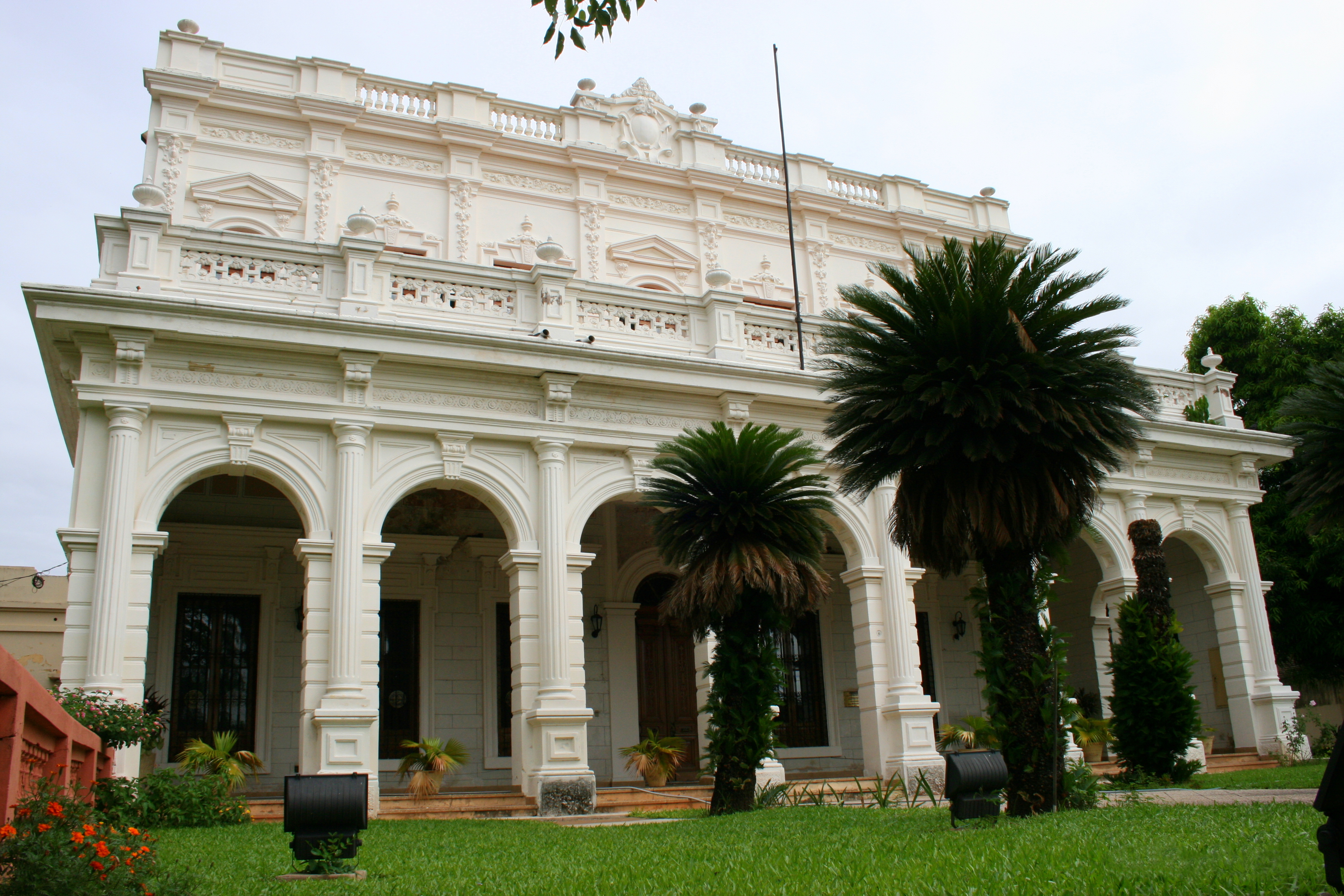
Universidad Nacional de Asunción

=== Schools ===
The city has a large number of both public and private schools. The best-known public schools are the Colegio Nacional de la Capital (which is one of the oldest schools in the city, founded in 1877), Colegio Técnico Nacional, Colegio Nacional Presidente Franco, and Colegio Nacional Asunción Escalada. The best-known private schools are, American School of Asunción, Colegio San José, St. Annes School, Colegio del Sol, Colegio Santa Clara, Colegio Goethe and Colegio de la Asunción, Colegio Las Almenas, Colegio Campoalto, Colegio Dante Alighieri, Colegio San Francisco, Colegio San Ignacio de Loyola, Colegio Santa Teresa de Jesús, Colegio Inmaculado Corazón de María, Salesianito, Colegio Cristo Rey, Colegio Internacional.

=== Universities ===
The main university in the city is Universidad Nacional de Asunción (state-run), having the most students. The Universidad Nacional de Asunción was founded in 1889 and has an enrollment of just over 40,000 students as of 2024.The Universidad Católica Nuestra Señora de la Asunción was founded in 1960 and has a current enrollment of around 21,000 students, being the second largest. The Católica has a small campus in the downtown area next to the cathedral and a larger campus in the Santa Ana neighborhood, outwards toward the adjoining city of Lambaré, while the Universidad Nacional has its main campus in the city of San Lorenzo, some 5 km (3 mi) eastward from Asunción. There are also a number of smaller, privately run universities such as Universidad Americana, Uninorte, and Universidad Autónoma de Asunción, etc.

== Demographics ==
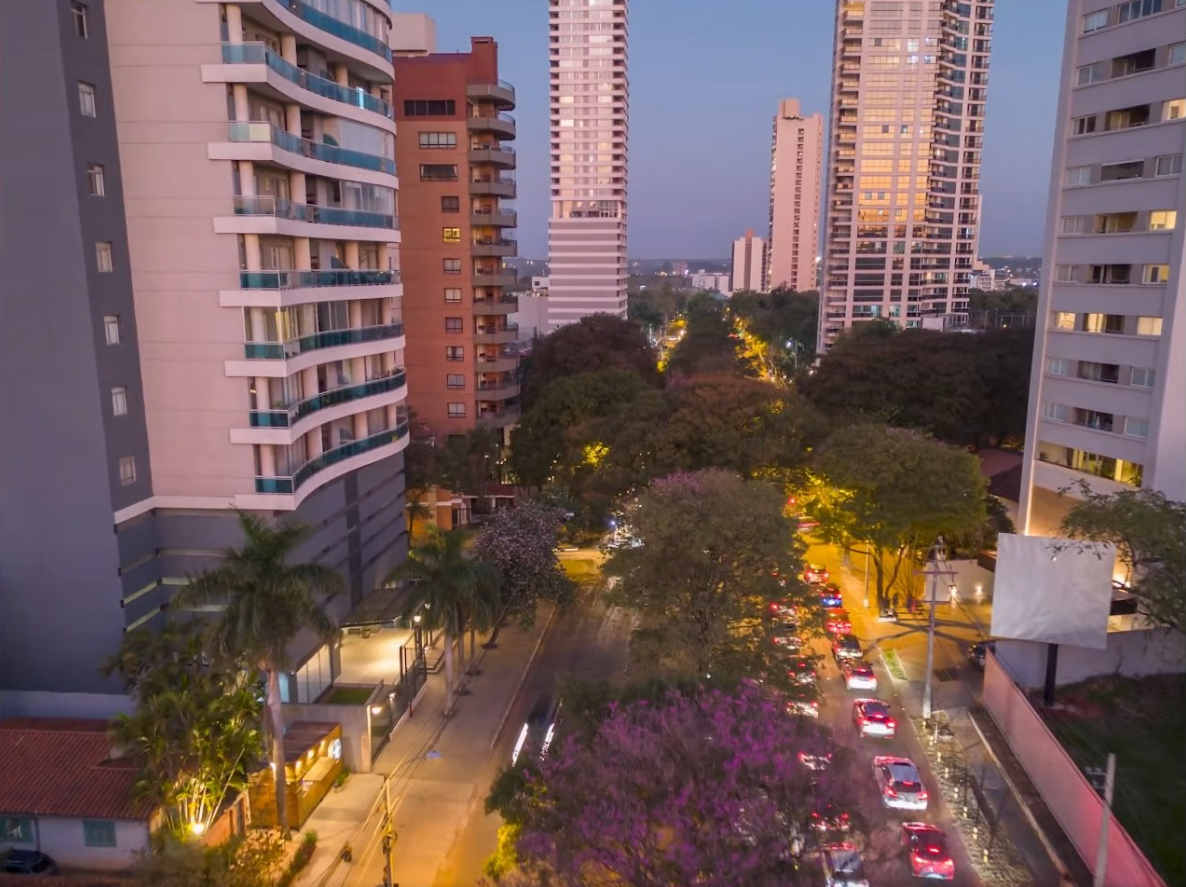
Santa Teresa Avenue

According to the last 2022 census the city has 462,241 inhabitants and a density of 3951/km^{2}, which represents 8% of the population of Paraguay. The Metropolitan Area of Asunción exceeds 2.4 million people, around 40% of the Paraguayan population. It is the most populated city in the country, with the greatest traffic of people and vehicles, since it is estimated that around 1.5 million people and 600,000 vehicles of all types circulate daily in Asunción.

Between 1962 and 1992, the capital city registered a more than double increase in inhabitants and is currently the only city in Paraguay to have almost 500,000 inhabitants, surpassing other large urban centers such as Ciudad del Este and San Lorenzo. Since the late 1990s, there has been demographic stagnation in the city because the peripheral cities belonging to Greater Asunción have recently absorbed most of the "new" population due to the low cost of land, lower taxes, easy access to the capital, among others factors.

The population has increased greatly during the last few decades as a consequence of internal migration from other Departments of Paraguay, at first because of the economic boom in the 1970s, and later because of economic recession in the countryside. The adjacent cities in the Gran Asunción area, such as Luque, Lambaré, San Lorenzo, Fernando de la Mora and Mariano Roque Alonso, have absorbed most of this influx due to the low cost of the land and easy access to Asunción.

The female population predominates in the city, as is characteristic in urban areas, which are poles of attraction due to the better employment opportunities offered to women. In Asunción, for every 100 women, there are only 89 men. The demographic structure by age group reveals that the group of people between 15 and 29 years old prevails, followed by the group of people between 30 and 59 years. The average age of Asunción is 31 years old, above the national average of 27 years. Asunción is considered a multicultural city.

=== Religion ===
Approximately 90% of the population of Asunción professes Catholicism. The Roman Catholic Archdiocese of Asunción covers an area of 2,582 square kilometers (997 square miles) including the city and surrounding area and has a total population of 1,780,000, of whom 1,612,000 are Catholic. The Catholic Archbishop is Eustaquio Pastor Cuquejo Verga, C.SS.R. In Paraguay's capital there are also places of worship of other Christian denominations, the Church of Jesus Christ of Latter-day Saints, as well as of other religions including Islam, Buddhism and Judaism.

=== Language ===
Most people in Asunción speak one of two languages as their principal language: Paraguayan Spanish (spoken by 56.9% of the population) and Guaraní (spoken by 11.2%). 27.4% of the population speaks the Jopará dialect, a mix of Guaraní with loanwords from Spanish (Creole). Other languages are represented by 4.5% of the population.

Historical population
Year	Pop.	±%
1950	206,634	—
1962	288,882	+39.8%
1972	388,958	+34.6%
1982	454,881	+16.9%
1992	500,938	+10.1%
2002	512,112	+2.2%
2012	529,433	+3.4%
2022	462,241	−12.7%

Population by sex and age according to the 2002 census

Age	Quantity (census 2002)	Male	Female
0–4 years	45,382	23,058	22,374
5–9 years	46,120	23,330	22,324
10–14 years	46,272	22,985	23,287
15–29 years	155.675	71,885	83,790
30–59 years	164,367	75,871	88,496
60+ years	54,296	21,686	32,610
Total	512,112	238,815	273,297

=== Districts and neighborhoods ===
Asunción is organised geographically into districts and these in turn bring together the different neighbourhoods.

Districts of Asunción

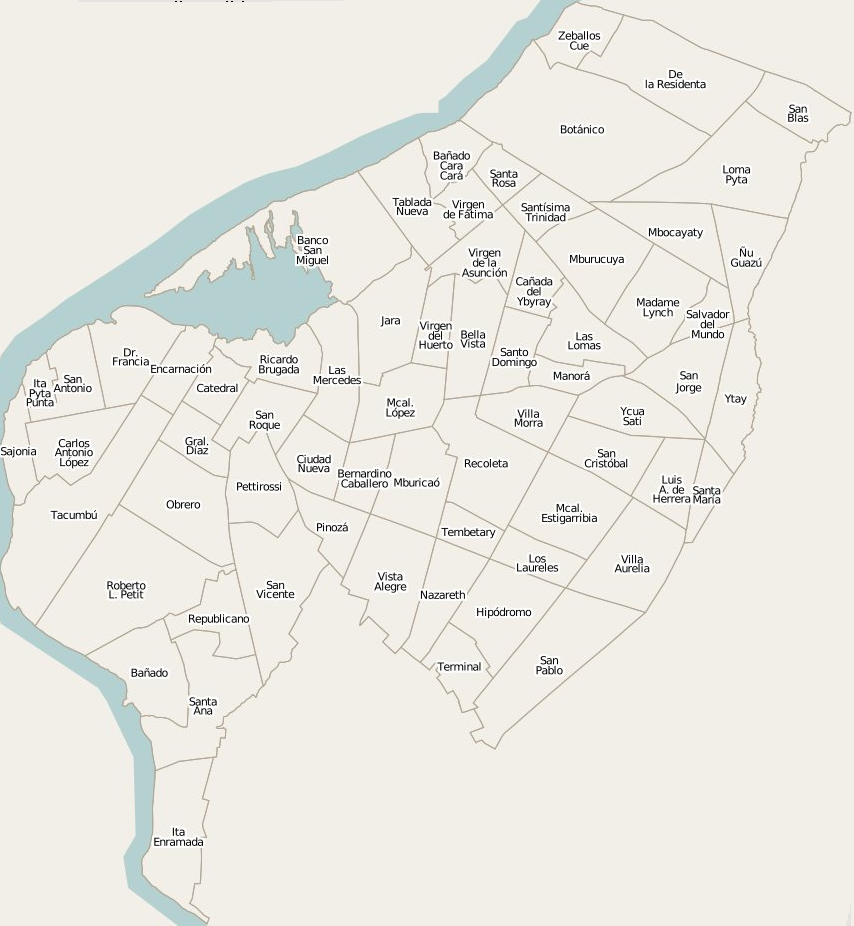
Neighborhoods of Asunción

The 68 neighborhoods of Asunción
N.º	Neighborhood	District	N.º	Neighborhood	District	N.º	Neighborhood	District	N.º	Neighborhood	District
1	Banco San Miguel	San Roque	2	Bañado Cará Cará	Trinidad	3	Bella Vista	Trinidad	4	Botánico	Trinidad
5	Cañada del Ybyray	Trinidad	6	Carlos A. López	La Encarnación	7	Carmelitas	Trinidad	8	Catedral	La Catedral
9	Ciudad Nueva	San Roque	10	Dr. Francia	La Encarnación	11	La Encarnación	La Encarnación	12	Gral. Caballero	San Roque
13	Gral. Díaz	La Catedral	14	Herrera	La Recoleta	15	Hipódromo	La Recoleta	16	Itá Enramada	Santa María
17	Itá Pytã Punta	La Encarnación	18	Jara	San Roque	19	Jukyty	Santa María	20	Los Laureles	La Recoleta
21	Loma Pytá	Trinidad	22	Madame Lynch	Trinidad	23	Manorá	Trinidad	24	Mcal. Estigarribia	La Recoleta
25	Mcal. López	San Roque	26	Mbocayaty	Trinidad	27	Mburicaó	San Roque	28	Mburucuyá	Trinidad
29	Las Mercedes	San Roque	30	Nazareth	La Recoleta	31	Ñu Guazú	Trinidad	32	Obrero	La Catedral
33	Pinozá	San Roque	34	Recoleta	La Recoleta	35	Republicano	Santa María	36	Ricardo Brugada	San Roque
37	Roberto L. Pettit	La Catedral	38	Sajonia	La Encarnación	39	Salvador del Mundo	Trinidad	40	San Antonio	La Encarnación
41	San Blas	Trinidad	42	San Cayetano	La Catedral	43	San Cristóbal	La Recoleta	44	San Jorge	La Recoleta
45	San Juan	San Roque	46	San Pablo	La Recoleta	47	San Roque	San Roque	48	San Vicente	San Roque
49	Santa Ana	La Catedral	50	Santa Librada	Santa María	51	Santa María	La Recoleta	52	Santa Rosa	Trinidad
53	Trinidad	Trinidad	54	Santo Domingo	Trinidad	55	Silvio Pettirossi	San Roque	56	Tablada Nueva	Trinidad
57	Tacumbú	La Encarnación	58	Tembetary	La Recoleta	59	Terminal	La Recoleta	60	Villa Aurelia	La Recoleta
61	Villa Morra	La Recoleta	62	V. de Fátima	Trinidad	63	V. de la Asunción	Trinidad	64	V. del Huerto	San Roque
65	Vista Alegre	San Roque	66	Ycuá Satí	La Recoleta	67	Ytay	La Recoleta	68	Zeballos Cué	Trinidad

== Infrastructure ==
Asunción has the main political, economic, social, recreational, and cultural infrastructure of the country. Its urban development began at the end of the 19th century, when the significant presence of Europeans brought with it an urban and aesthetic remodeling of the city, with the construction of numerous buildings and mansions, maintained to this day under the protection of a municipal ordinance that prevents major changes or demolitions. Drinking water and electricity coverage reaches almost 100% of the city.

=== Roads and highways ===
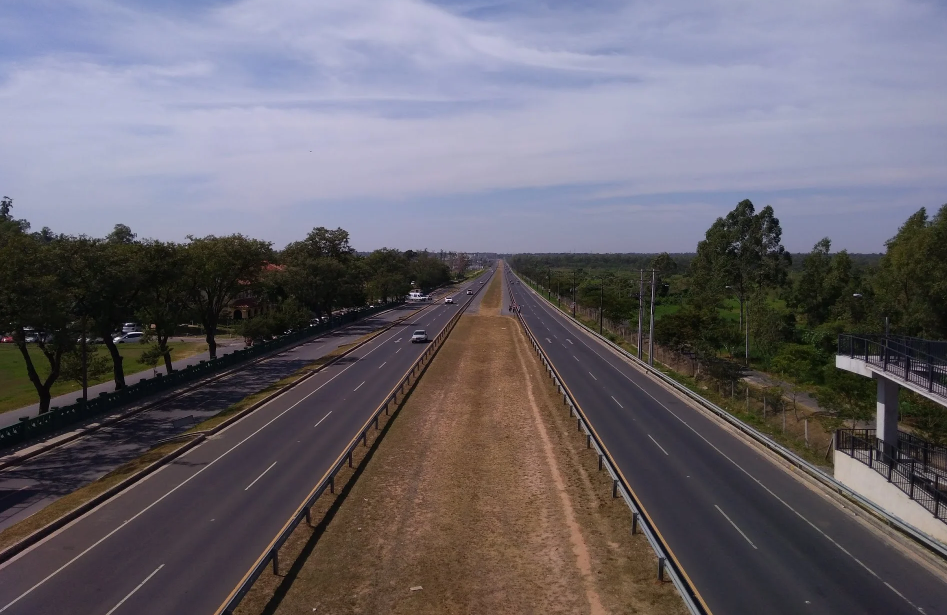
Ñu Guazú highway

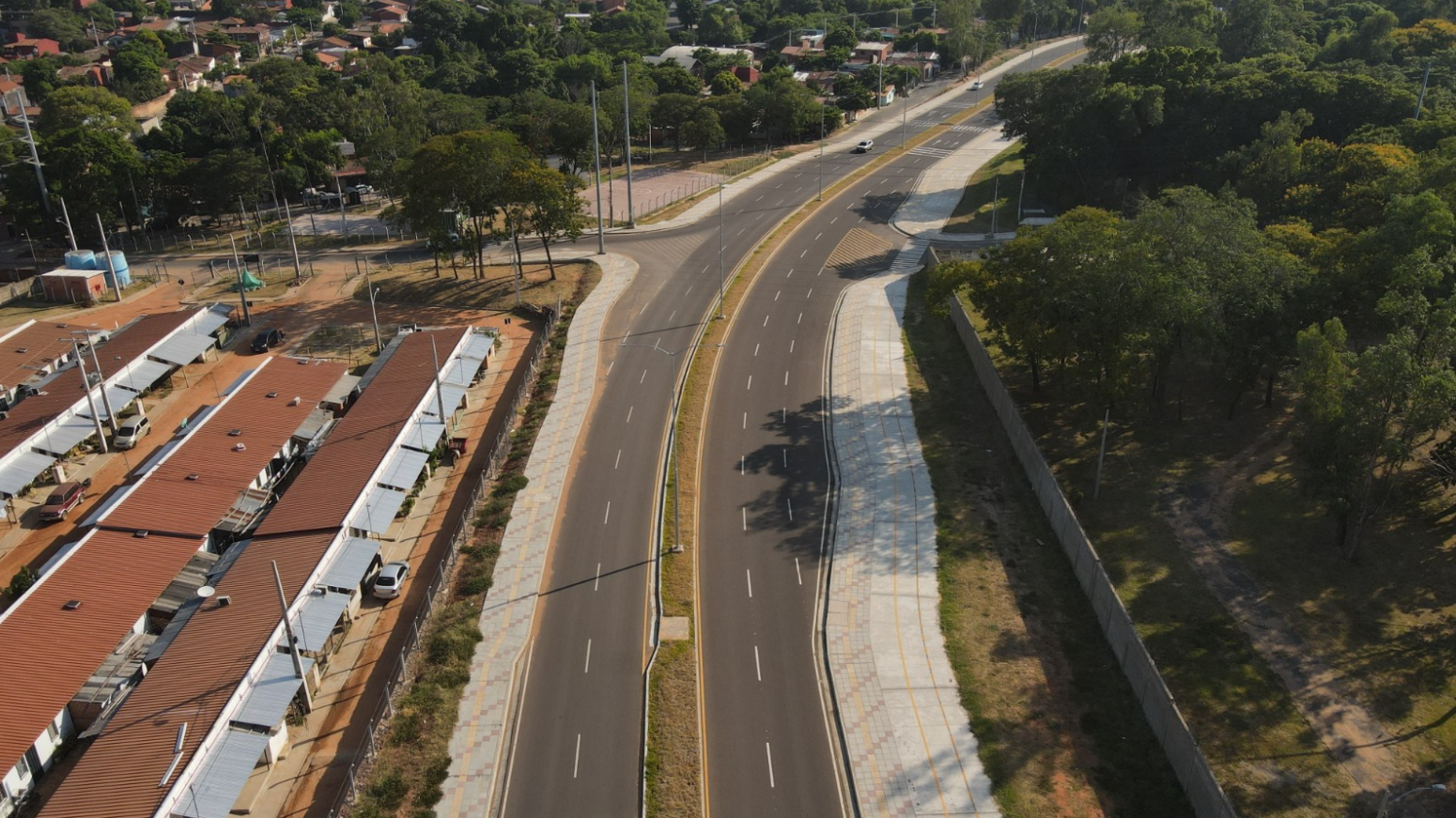
Costanera Sur

The road infrastructure has been maintained for various periods of time without significant changes. The main access routes to the city are avenues and to a lesser extent highways and viaducts. Previously, the electric tram existed as a means of transportation until the end of the last century, but it was replaced by new fleets of buses. The construction of the metrobus and the local train was planned, which will connect the capital with the rest of the metropolitan area, but it was interrupted due to various irregularities.

Mariscal López Avenue connects the capital with the neighboring city of Fernando de la Mora and passes through two large areas: the Villa Morra neighborhood and the Old town; General Santos Avenue is an important access route to the capital, it is mostly used by the inhabitants of neighboring Lambaré; while Eusebio Ayala Avenue is mainly used by buses during peak hours, due to the large number of lanes available. The Acceso Sur viaduct connects with the Mercado de Abasto, an important supply center. Madame Lynch Avenue borders practically the entire eastern area of the city, being a quick route to cross from one side to the other. Aviadores del Chaco Avenue is an important access road from Luque and also serves as a highway for access to the Conmebol building complex and the international airport, among other important places. Ñu Guazú highway connects the cities of Luque and Mariano Roque Alonso with Asunción.

=== Transportation ===
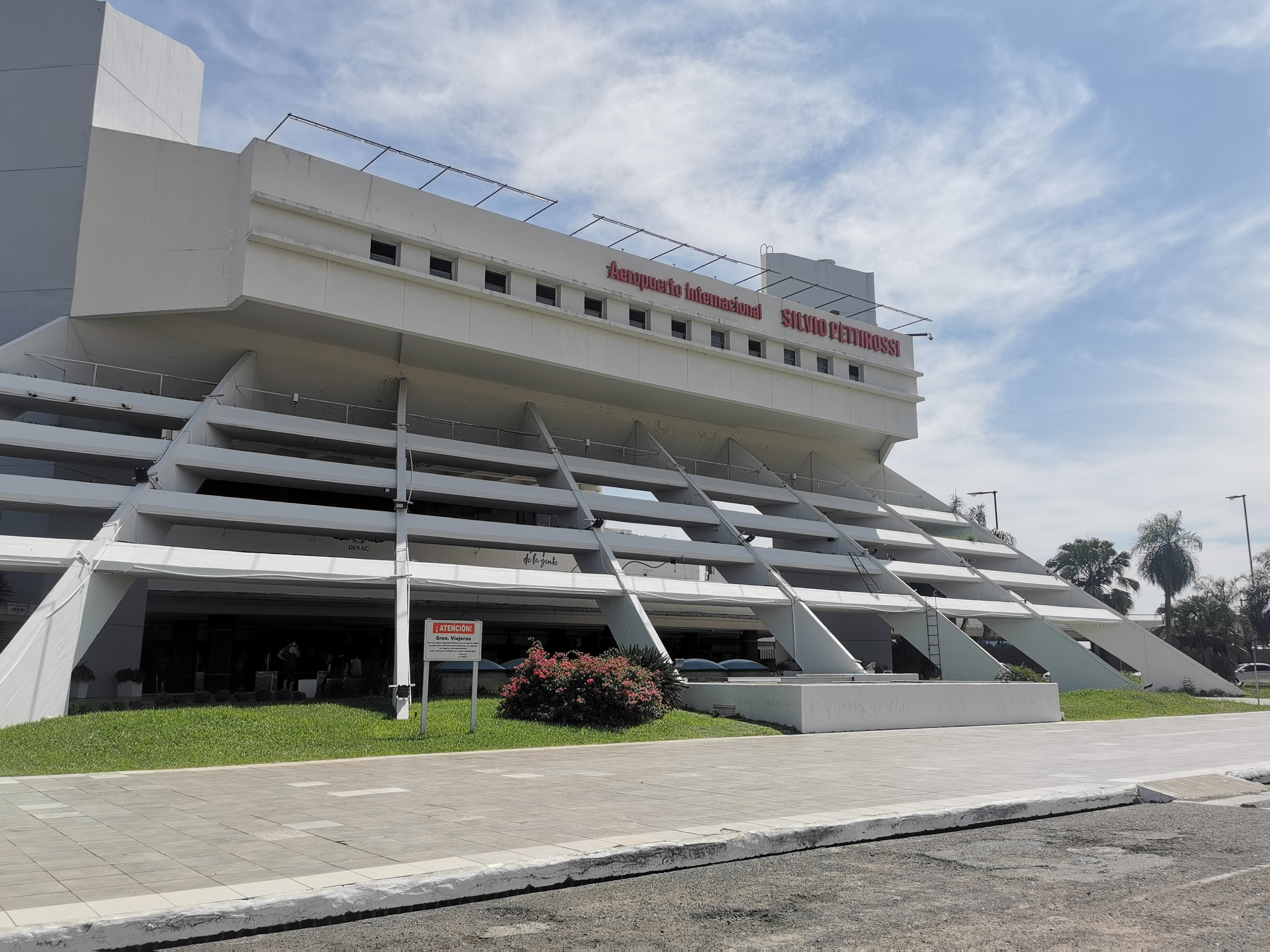
Silvio Pettirossi International Airport

Because the Paraguay River runs right next to Asunción the city is served by a river terminal in the downtown area. This port is strategically located inside a bay and it is where most freight enters and leaves the country. There is a smaller terminal in the Sajonia neighborhood, and a shuttle port in Ita Enramada, almost opposite the Argentine city of Clorinda, Formosa.

Public transportation is used heavily and is served through buses (locally called colectivos, micros or buses) that reach all the regions of the city and surrounding "dormitory communities". From 23 October 2020, an electronic card is required to use these buses. There are two cards available from two different providers: "Jaha" (Guarani for Let's Go) and "Más" (Spanish for More).

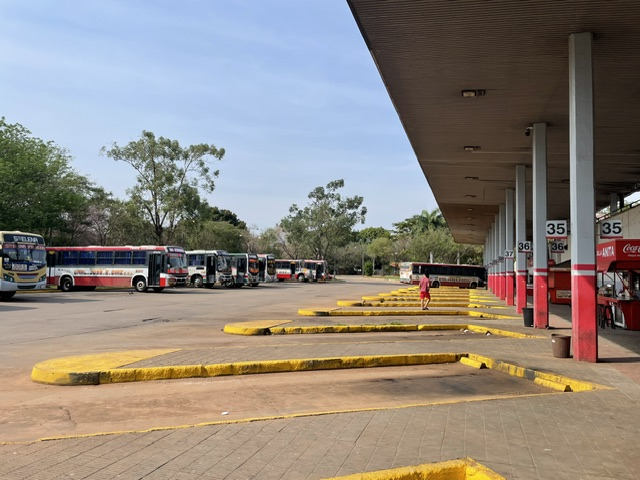
Bays at the long-distance bus terminal

The main long-distance bus terminal (TOA, or Terminal de Ómnibus de Asunción) is on the República Argentina Avenue and its bus services connect all of the Departments of Paraguay, as well as international routes to nearby countries such as Argentina, Brazil, Bolivia and Uruguay. Some 115 companies service more than 1,300 departures per day. As many as 55,000 passengers depart on these routes daily, with demand peaking on special occasions like Holy Week and New Year's Day.

Silvio Pettirossi International Airport is Paraguay's main national and international gateway, located at Luque, suburb of the capital, Asunción. It is named after Paraguayan aviator Silvio Pettirossi and was formerly known as Presidente Stroessner International Airport. As Paraguay's busiest airport, it is the hub of Latam Paraguay and Paranair.

Bolt and Uber compete with various taxi companies.

=== Healthcare ===
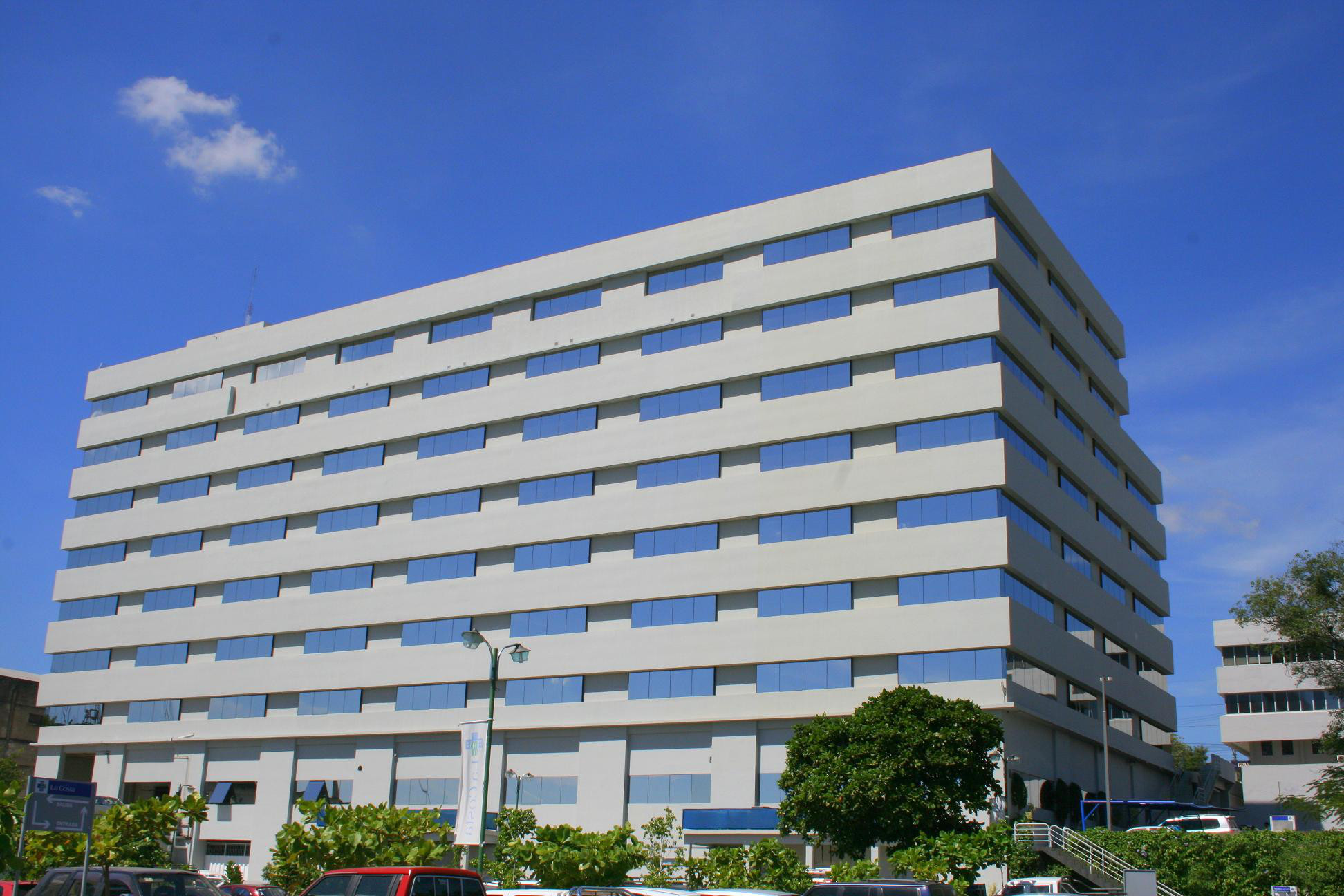
Centro Médico La Costa

Asunción houses most of the large medical centers throughout the country. There are currently more than 50 places that provide primary health care. While public health is dependent on the State and completely free in theory, medicine scarcity and overcrowding in hospitals is frequently reported. Through a resolution promoted by President Fernando Lugo in December 2009, free treatment applies at the national level. This has made it possible for more people to have access to different health services, ranging from outpatient consultations to highly complex interventions in public hospitals.

Some of the public hospitals located in the city are the Hospital del Trauma, the Hospital Militar, the Hospital Central del IPS, and the Hospital Central Policial Rigoberto Caballero.

=== Security ===
Asunción previously did not have its own police force. Despite being an independent municipality, Paraguayan legislation does not establish the creation of police forces by districts. All public security was protected by the National Police. However, on 23 December 2010, the former municipal mayor Arnaldo Samaniego promulgated the first ordinance that created the Municipal Police of Asunción, taking into account that one of the priorities of his government program was citizen security. Currently, the Municipal Police of Asunción is made up of 52 police officers.

Records of the National Police, corresponding to the January-June semester of 2025, show that the highest concentration of criminal cases in the country occurred in the Central and Asunción departments, with 1,843 and 1,275 people apprehended or detained, respectively. Regarding the reasons, 38% of the proceedings were linked to acts against property, followed by cases related to physical integrity (24%), public safety (15%), "freedom" (9%) and "life" (6%). According to nation-wide research by CONACYT, "98.5% of the population in Asuncion reported that crime has increased in recent years." However, it also reported that "Both homicide and property crimes showed a downward trend in Asunción between 2010 and 2017, with the number of reported cases decreasing by 23.7% and property crimes by 24.3%."

== Urban projects ==
=== Social housing ===
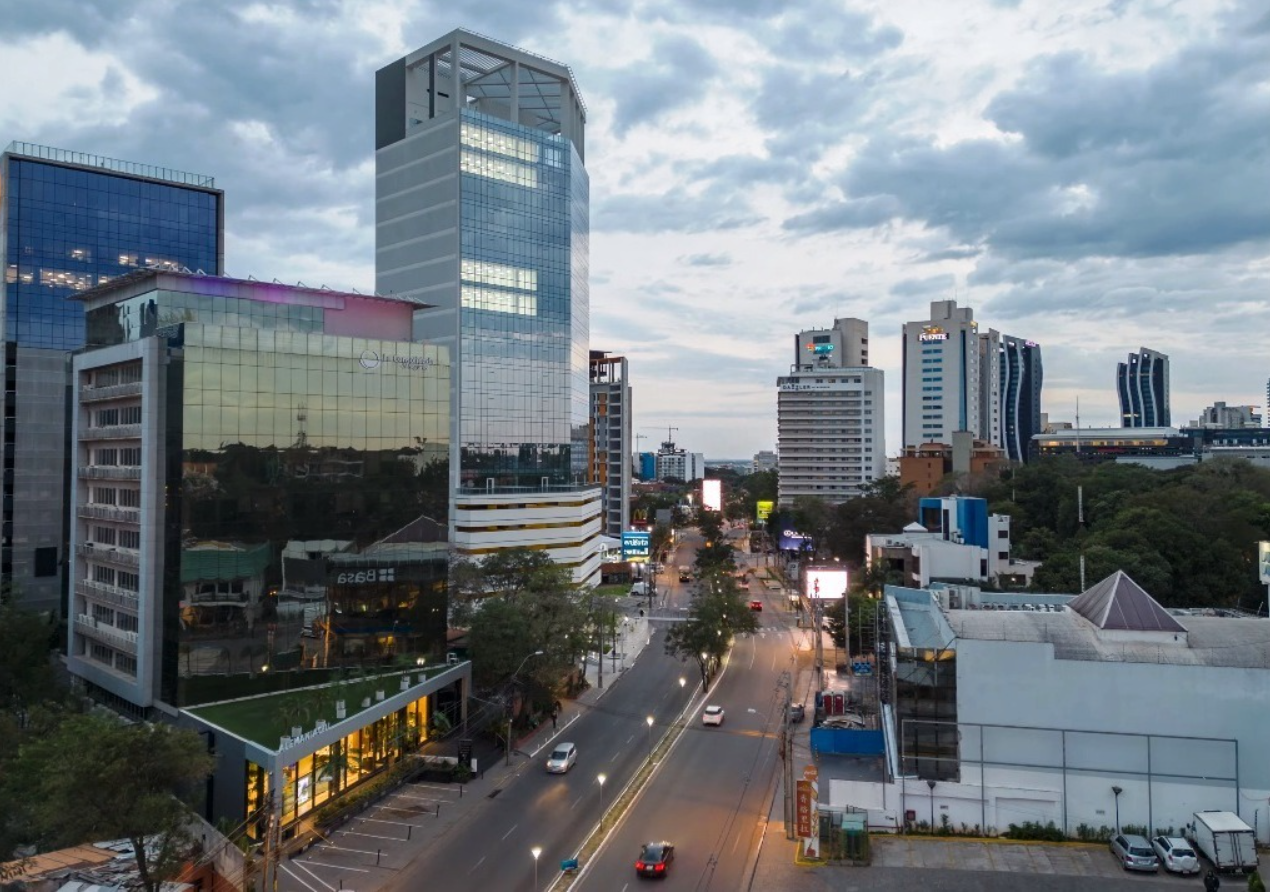
Aviadores del Chaco Avenue

In the construction projects of "Avenida Costanera Norte" and "Parque Bicentenario" a new neighborhood was created with 144 popular homes to resettle families that were directly affected by the plans to improve the infrastructure of the city. The project included a "social component" that cost around $5.8 million to build the houses and infrastructure of the new neighborhood and pay compensation to families who were going to leave the area.

=== Coastal Linear Park ===
The coastal park of about 13 hectares was built. This park unites the old buildings of the urban area, such as the Palacio de los López, with the Cabildo and Metropolitan Cathedral of Asunción. It was inaugurated in May 2011, within the framework of the celebrations of the bicentennial of the independence of Paraguay.

Subsequently, work on the "Parque Lineal Costanera" project continued, the first stage of which was enabled at the end of 2019 with the following characteristics: exclusive bicycle lanes, paths, fair spaces, gym equipment, and a parking lot with capacity for 350 vehicles. The second stage of this linear park will add 10 hectares of new green space, contemplating three key components: a coastal linear park, a component for the National Navy, and a boat ramp. The characteristics of the second stage Linear Park are: 3-meter-wide bike paths, parking spaces, bicycle parking, drinking fountains, toilets, 3 reinforced concrete bridges, soccer fields, playgrounds, outdoor gym areas, first aid, and a police booth.

=== Port axis and government offices ===
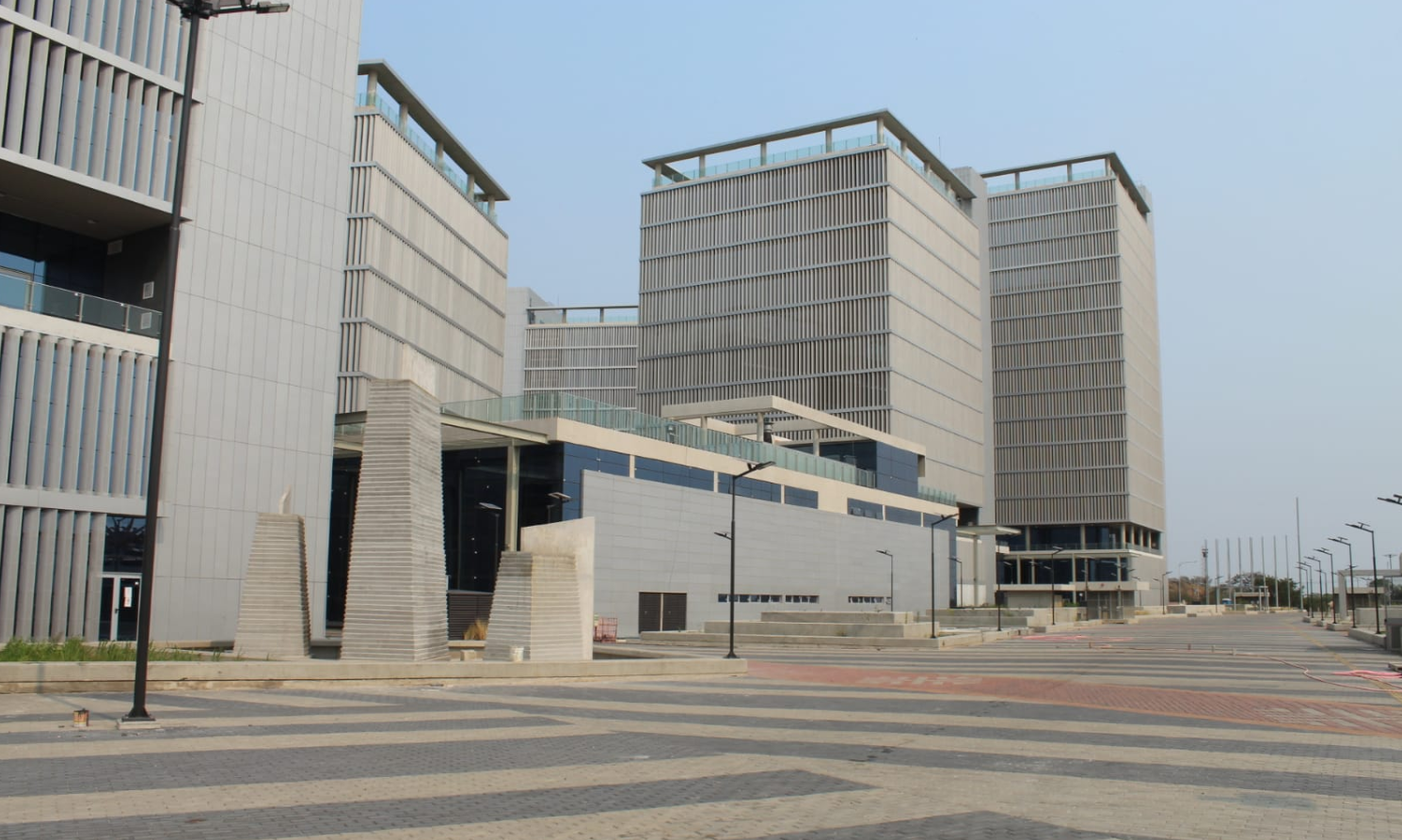
Ministerial axis of the port

These are five towers where six ministries of the Executive branch will be installed, located in the port of Asunción. These works culminated at the end of 2020 and constitute the new building corporations built in the old town, which will serve as an anchor for the reconversion of the place. The project of the Master Plan for the Reconversion of the Port of Asunción, promoted by The Ministry of Public Works and Communications (MOPC) was conceived in the 1990s, and has been reconfirmed in each government since then. An example of this is the completion of the Costanera Sur and Costanera Norte works. The construction of the new government offices is the nerve center of Asunción, according to Óscar Stark, manager of the Urban Reconversion Program. The project includes scaffolding to prevent the problems generated by the growth of the Paraguay River, with a level of 64, which refers to a protection of up to 10 meters. Historical data indicate that the highest flood in the last 100 years was at level 63. The construction of a museum is also planned, which is a posthumous work of the architect Carlos Colombino, of which the project has been completed, and whose investment will be financed through the public-private alliance (PPA), which will equip a shopping center, hotel, convention center, and apartment buildings.

== Culture ==
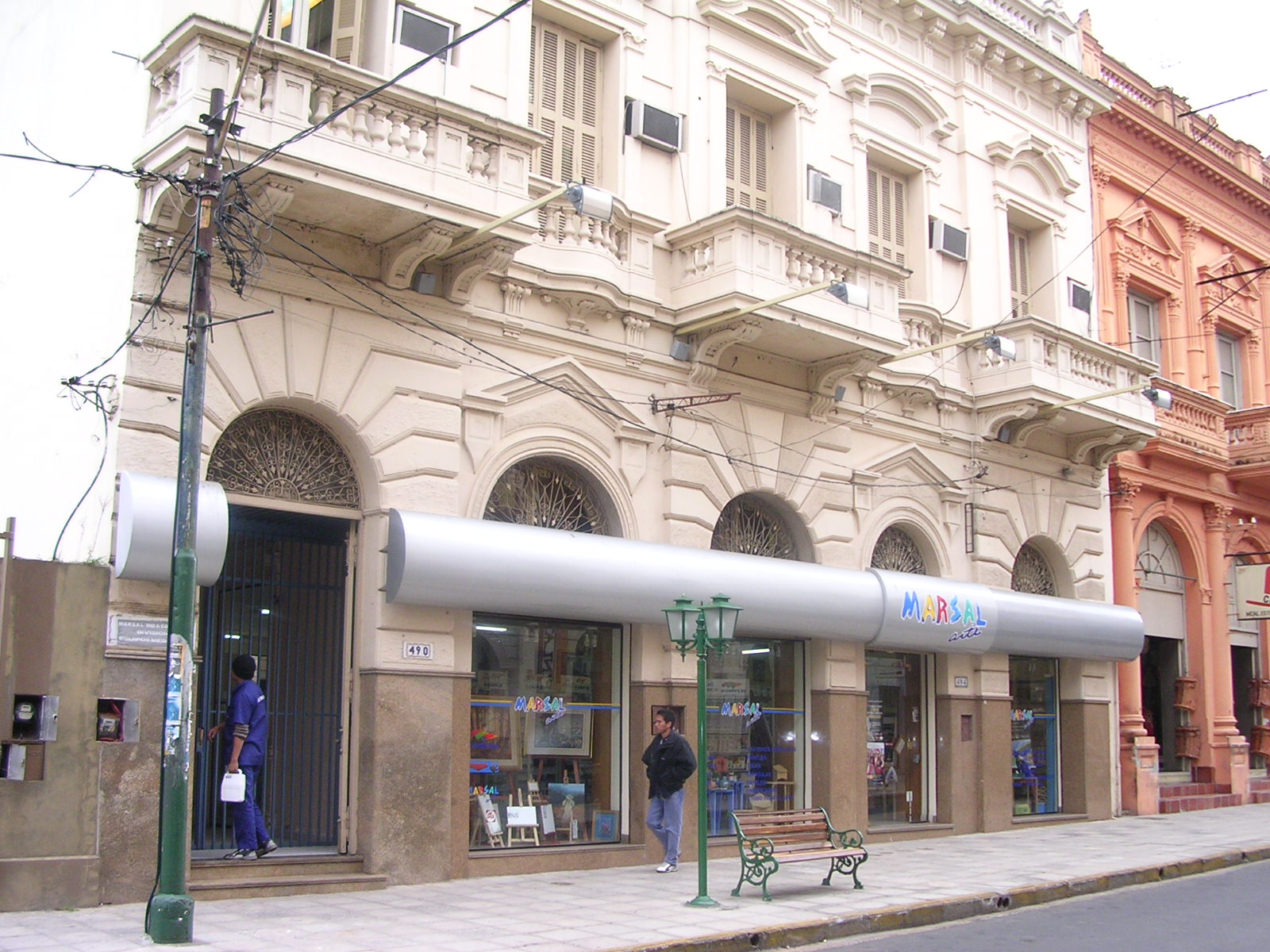
Traditional buildings in Calle Palma

Being the third-oldest capital city of South America, after Quito and Lima, Asunción has plenty to offer, culturally speaking, from Spanish colonial-era buildings (Baroque to neo-Gothic), museums or urban parks, this classic city also hosts several symphony orchestras, ballet, opera and theater companies. The best known orchestras are the City of Asunción's Symphony Orchestra (OSCA), the National Symphony Orchestra and the Northern University Symphony Orchestra. Among professional ballet companies, most renowned are the Asunción Classic and Modern Municipal Ballet, the National Ballet and the Northern University Ballet. The main opera company is the Northern University Opera Company. A long-standing theater company is Arlequín Theater Foundation's. Traditional venues include the Municipal Theater, the Paraguayan-Japanese Center, the Central Bank's Great Lyric Theater, the Juan de Salazar Cultural Center, the Americas Theater, the Tom Jobim Theater, the Arlequín Theater and the Manzana de la Rivera. Among the many venues for concerts in the city, the Jockey Club (Asunción) is one of the most important. Asunción is also the center of Architecture in Paraguay.

=== Museums ===
Museums in and around Asunción are generally small. Museums in Asunción include:

- National Museum of Fine Arts: Inaugurated in 1909
- Museum of Memories "Dictatorship and Human Rights": The relatives of the victims of Alfredo Stroessner's dictatorship began the search for the whereabouts of their loved ones, as the years passed they gathered data, photographs, and reconstructed lives, names and surnames. They then published a book that became a true reference, titled "Semillas de Vida Ñemity Ra." Based on their photos and information, this museum gathers a special collection.
- Visual Arts Center or Clay Museum: It is aimed at showing popular art, indigenous art, and contemporary art of Paraguay on equal terms. Its rigorously selected artistic heritage has made it, in a very short time, one of the most important references of the arts in Paraguay and one of the most notable ones in South America. The rooms of the clay museum, whose heritage exceeds 4,000 pieces corresponding to mestizo productions from the 17th century onwards, house objects that include wood carvings, fabrics, lace, ceramics and goldsmithing, in addition to including a good number of pre-Columbian ceramic pieces originating from the entire American continent.
- Manzana de la Rivera: Brings together nine houses built at different times. The oldest one, the "Casa Viola", which dates back to the 18th century (1750–1758), is a colonial construction that corresponds before the times of dictator José Gaspar Rodríguez de Francia. The "Castelvi House" was built in 1804 and shows a typical colonial construction system, and was restored in 1995; since 1996 it has functioned as the City Memory Museum.
- Museo Judío del Paraguay "Dr. Walter Kochmann" (Jewish Museum of Paraguay): a Jewish museum about the Jews of Paraguay

=== Green capital ===
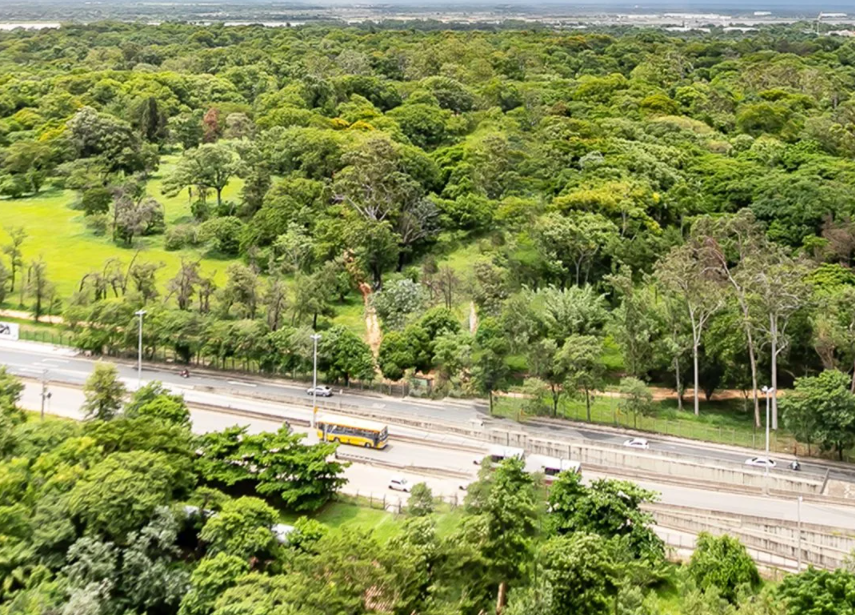
Botanical Garden of Asunción

Asunción was declared the "Green Capital of Ibero-America" during the period of former intendant Arnaldo Samaniego (2010–2015) in Lisbon, at the meeting of the Union of Ibero-American Capital Cities (UCCI). The municipal public policy called "Rohayhu Asunción, Green Capital" (Guaraní: I love you Asunción, the green capital of the world) fulfilled seven indicators that must be adequate by the city to opt for the denomination. These indicators are biodiversity or green areas per person, public green areas, number of trees planted, number of bird species, and number of migratory birds; Waste: waste ratio, collectors and proper disposal, waste generated per person, waste recycling and refusal policy; Land use and buildings: population density, green building policy, land use policy and urban planning; Transportation: extension of the mass transportation network, number of cars and motorcycles, urban mass transportation policy, vehicle congestion reduction policy; Water: population with access to drinking water, water sustainability policy; Sanitation: population with access to improved sanitation, sanitation policy, storm drainage works; Air Quality: clean air policy; and Environmental Governance: environmental monitoring and public participation.

=== The seven treasures of cultural heritage material of Asunción ===
The selection of the seven treasures of cultural heritage material took place in Asunción during the months of April and May 2009. Promoted by the "Organización Capital Americana de la Cultura", with the collaboration of the Paraguayan authorities participating in the election was carried out with the intention to disclose the material cultural heritage of Asunción.

A total of 45 candidates have chosen to become one of the treasures of cultural heritage material Assumption. The result of the vote, which involved 12,417 people, is as follows: Palacio de los López, the National Pantheon of Heroes, the Cabildo, the Metropolitan Cathedral, the Guaraní Hotel, the Municipal Theater and the Church of the Holy Trinity.

== Tourism ==
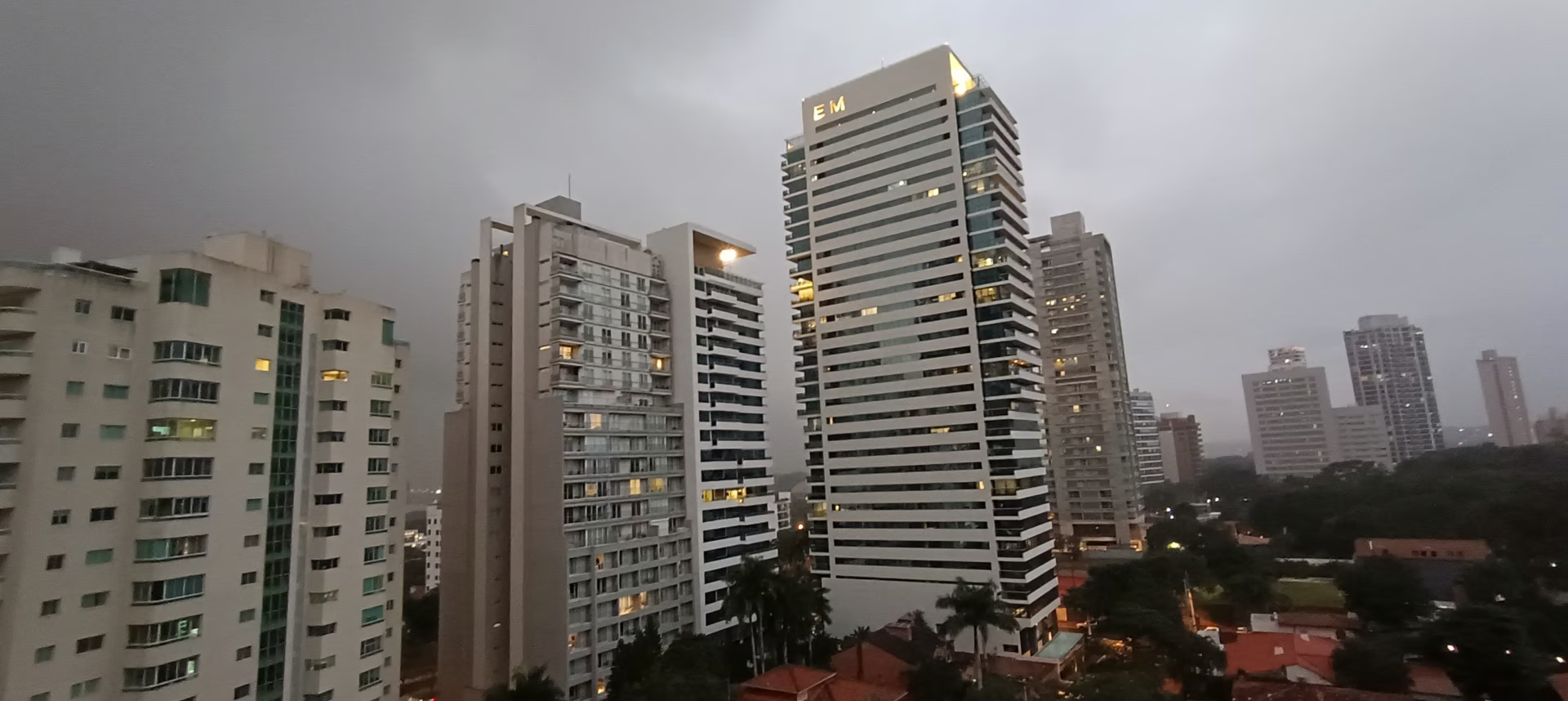
Corporate-residential axis in the new center

The city is home to the Godoy Museum, the Museo Nacional de Bellas Artes (which contains paintings from the 19th century), the Church of La Encarnación, the Metropolitan Cathedral and the National Pantheon of the Heroes, a smaller version of Les Invalides in Paris, where many of the nation's heroes are entombed. Other landmarks include the Palacio de los López, the old Senate building (a modern building opened to house Congress in 2003) and the Casa de la Independencia (one of the few examples of colonial architecture remaining in the city).

=== Hospitality industry ===
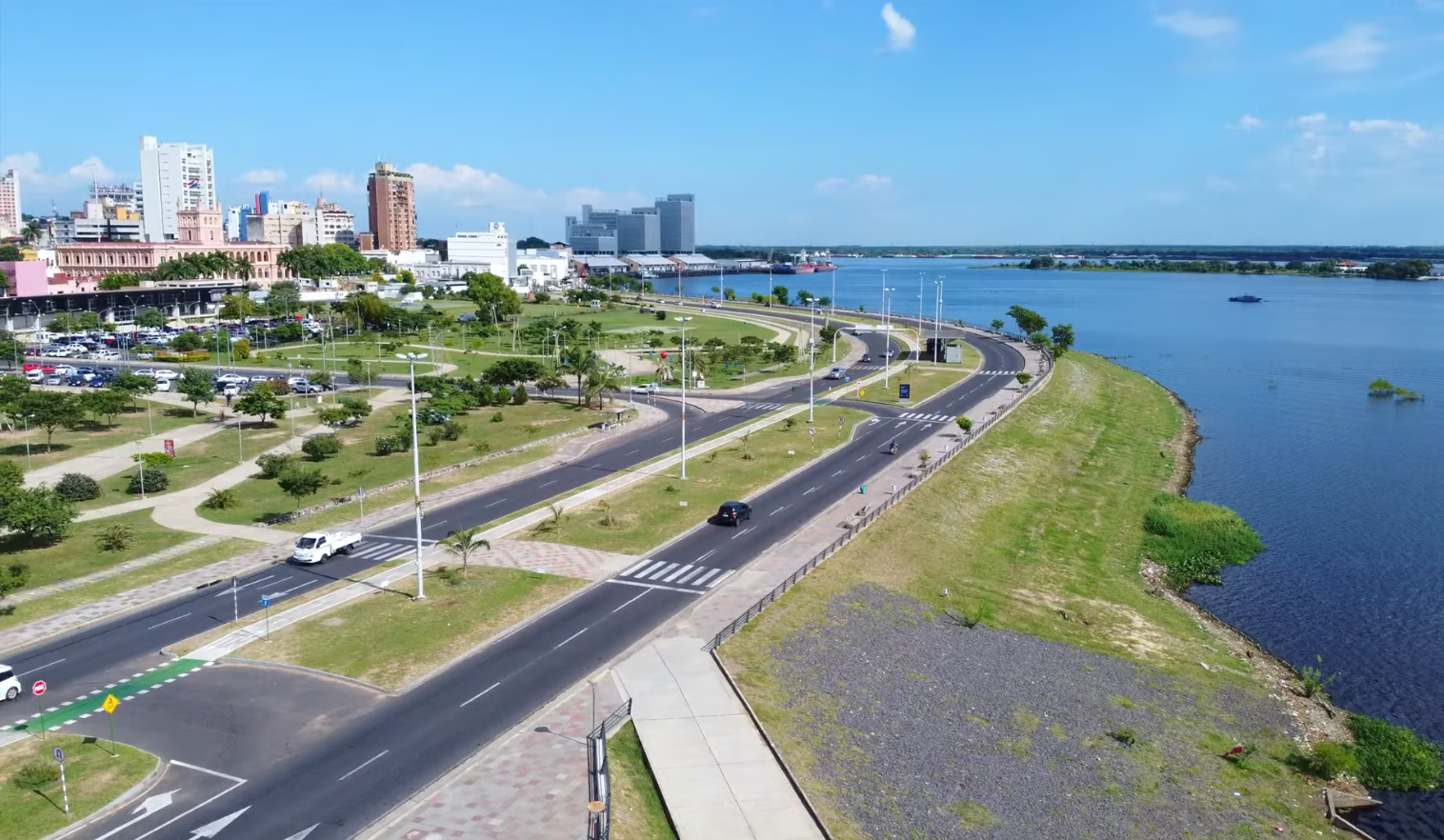
North Riverfront

The Paraguayan hospitality industry has seen significant investments in recent years. This economic sector is contributing strongly to the growth of the country's tourism sector. This brought with it greater capacity and quality of accommodation and, according to Senatur data, between 2013 and 2017 the number of beds grew 34%. In 2017, Paraguay reached record numbers in the arrival of international tourists, with growth three times higher than the world average, a dynamism that has been underpinned by the increase in the number of accommodation establishments in the country.

At the country level there are more than 905 accommodation establishments, totaling 33,813 beds. In 2017, approximately 1.6 million foreign tourists arrived, generating foreign exchange earnings of more than US$600 million, especially in Asunción.

=== Places of interest ===
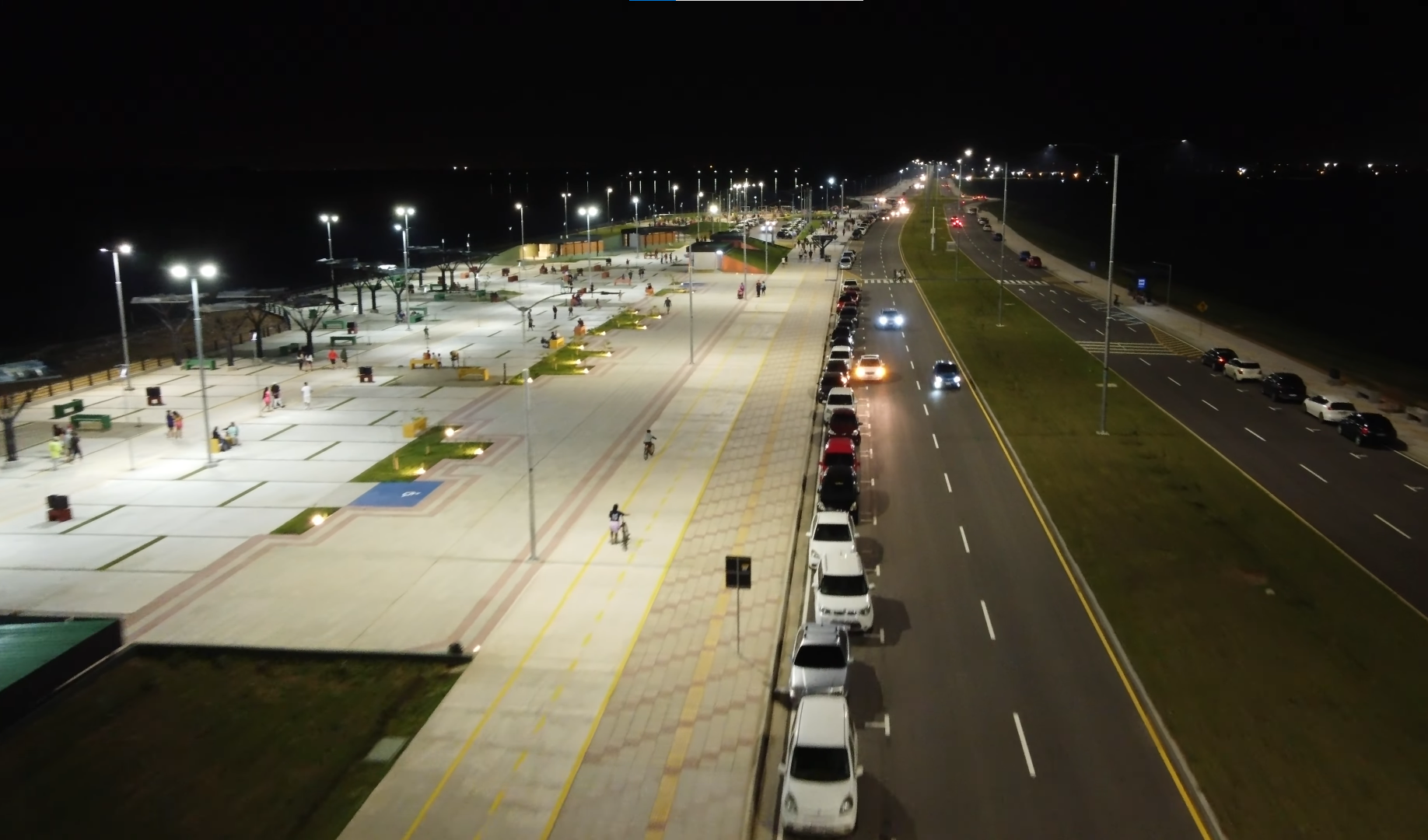
South Riverfront

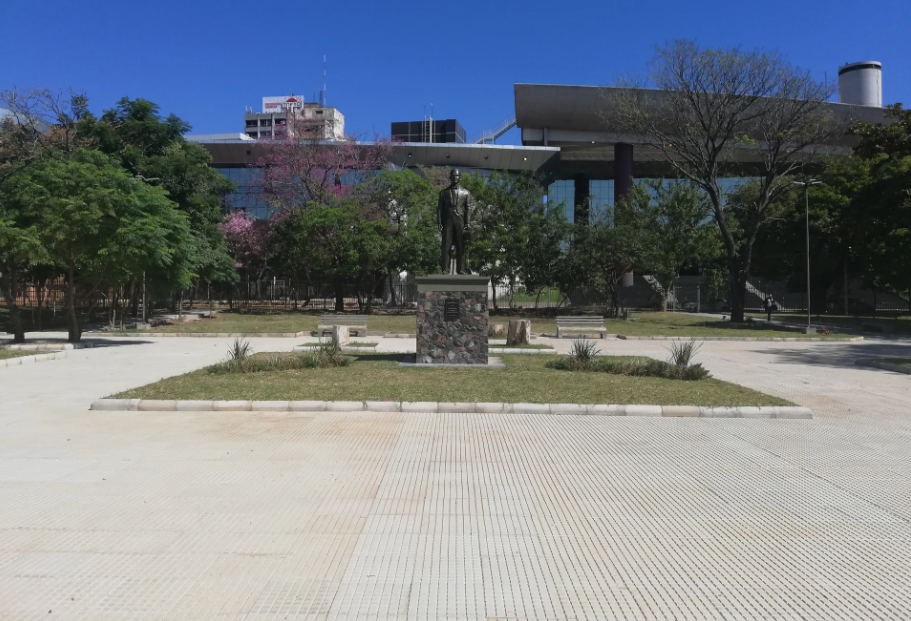
Plaza Eligio Ayala, in front of the National Congress

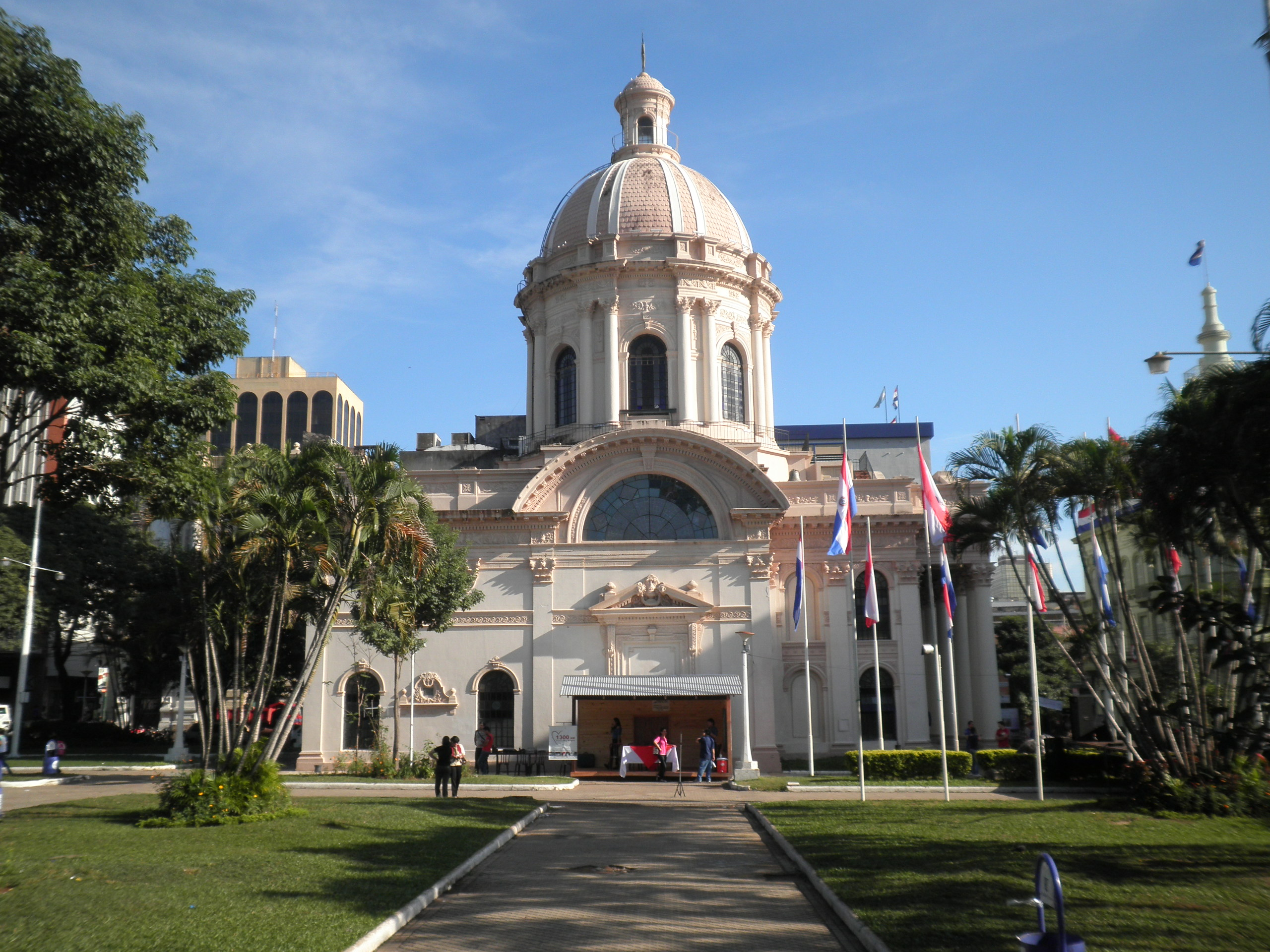
National Pantheon of the Heroes

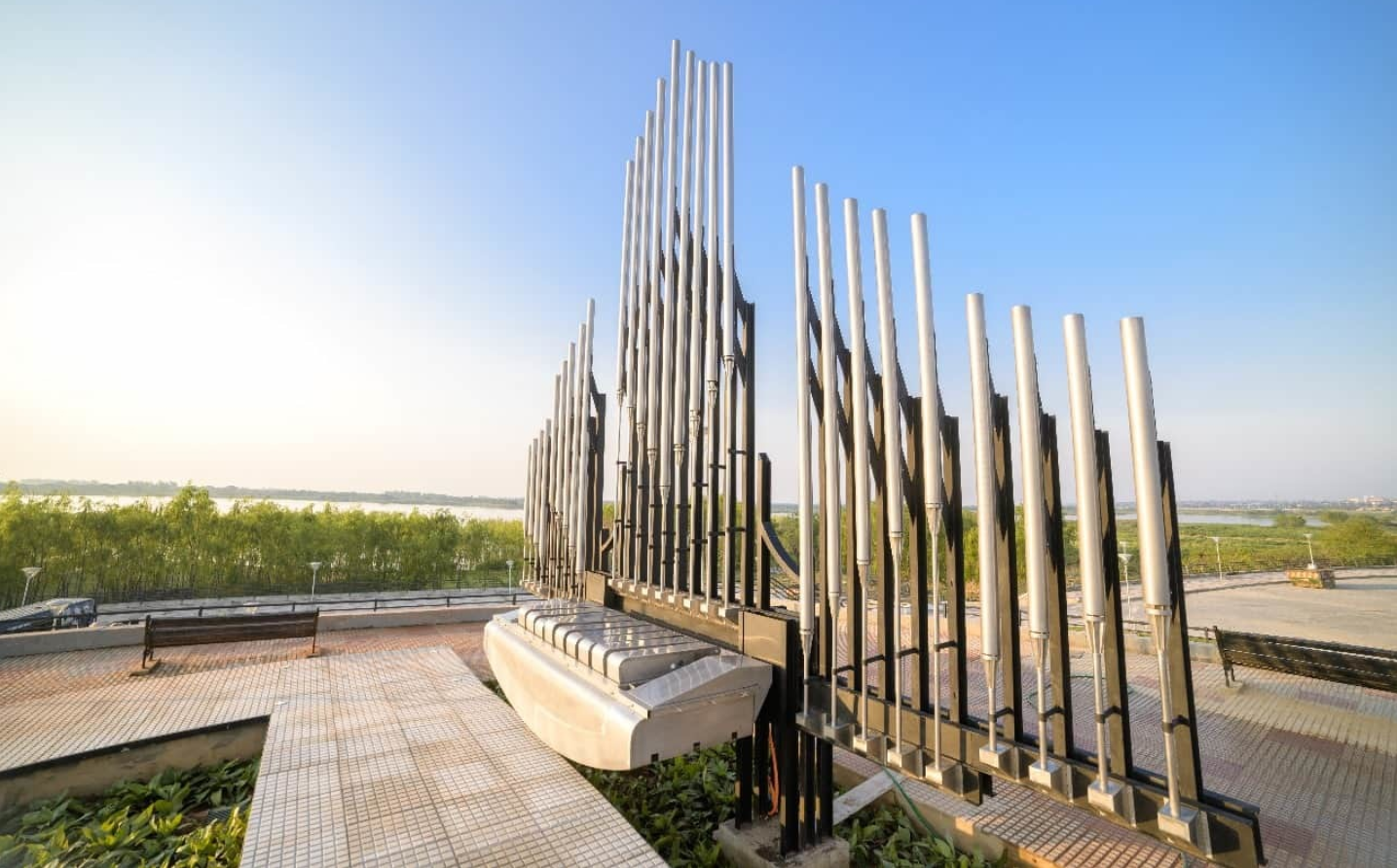
Paseo de la Guarania, a water organ that plays guarania melodies

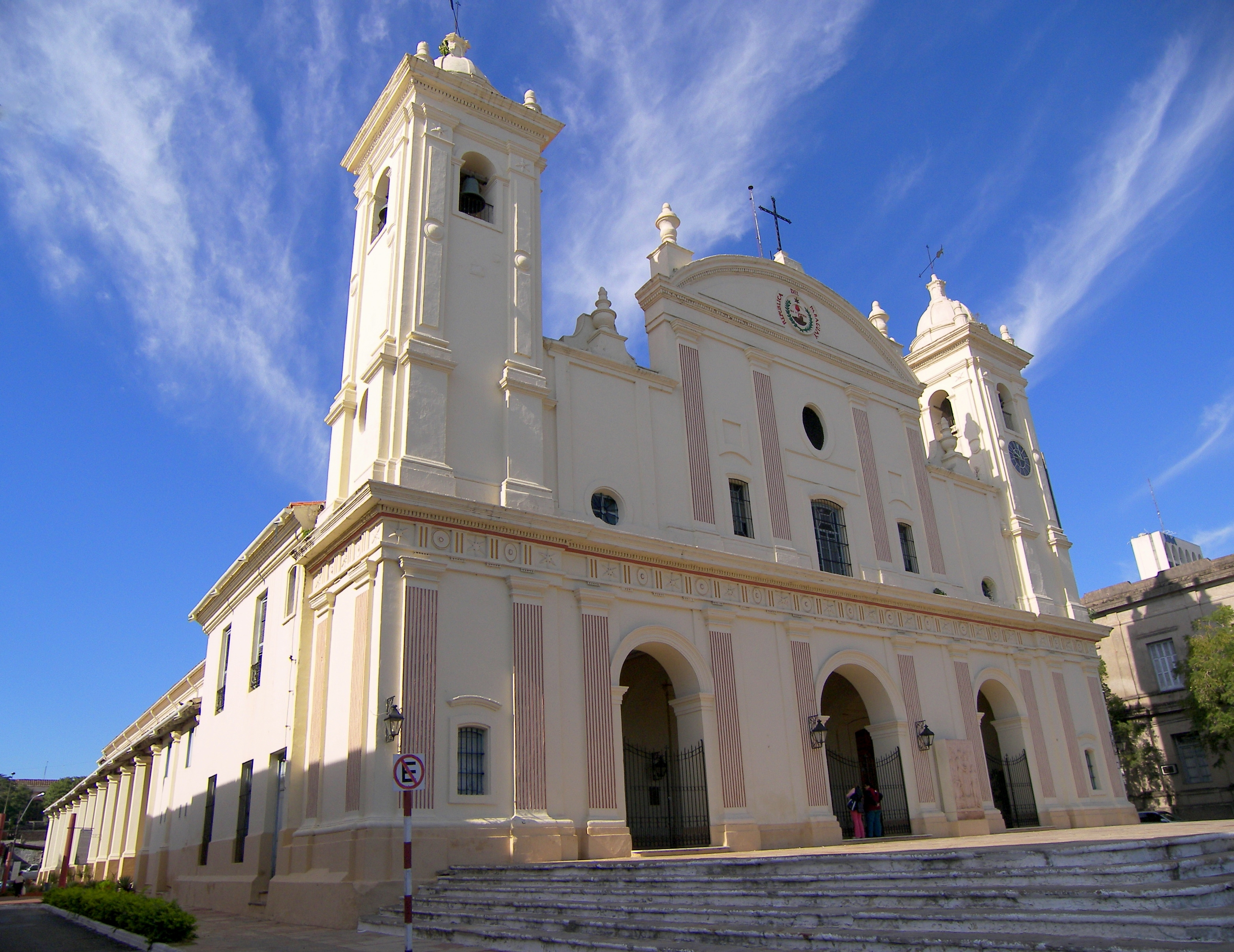
Metropolitan Cathedral of Asunción

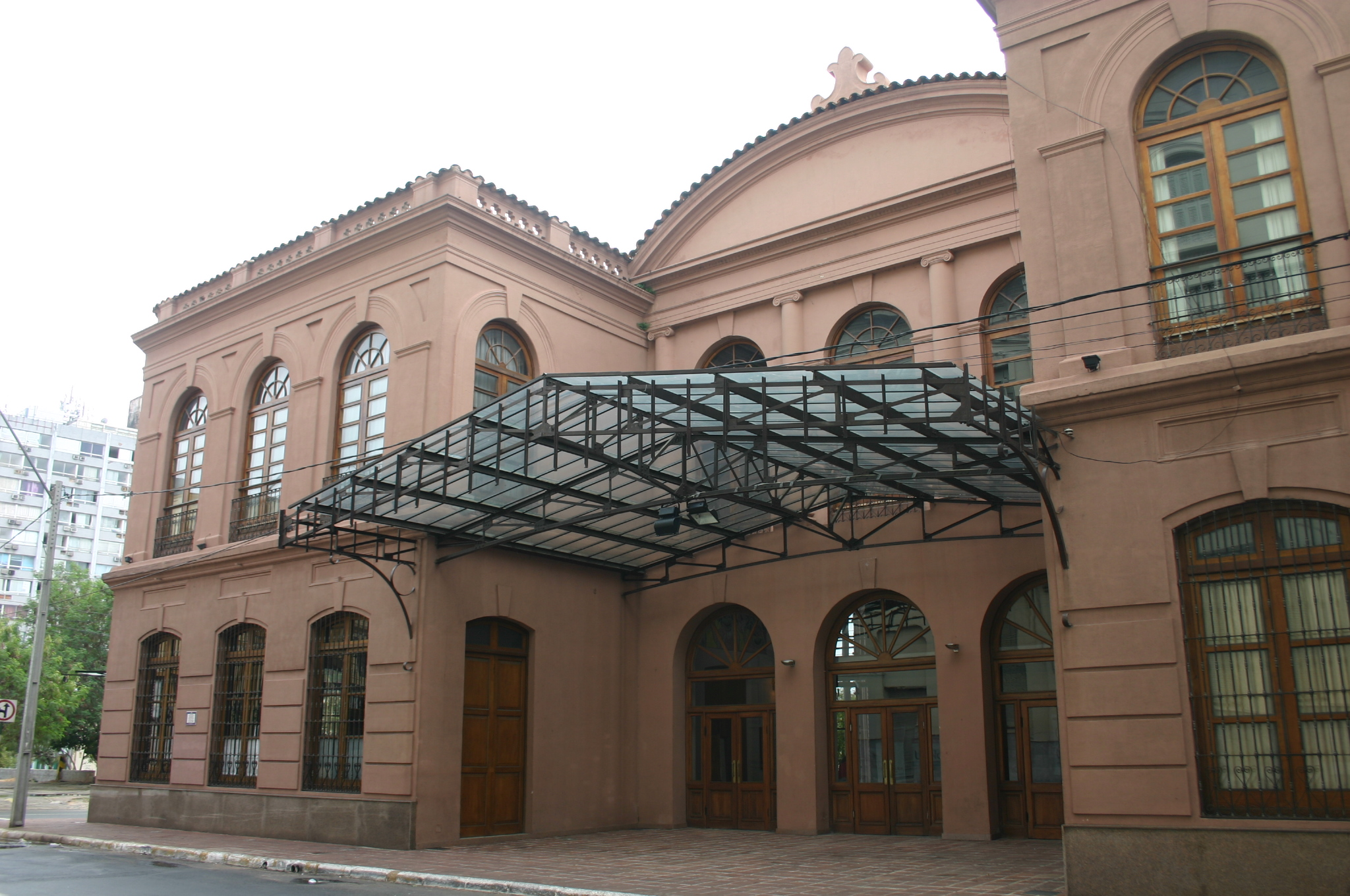
Ignacio A. Pane Municipal Theater

- Old town extends parallel to the bay, between Plaza Uruguaya and the port.
- Palacio de los López is the headquarters of the Executive Branch.
- Casa de la Independencia Museum
- Municipal Theatre Ignacio A. Pane.
- National Pantheon of the Heroes
- Cabildo Museum.
- Asunción Metropolitan Cathedral.
- Botanical Garden and Zoo of Asunción.
- Bicentennial Astronomical Center.

== Media ==
=== Television ===
Television
TV Channel	Logo	Channel name	Topic	Type
Canal 4		Telefuturo	Variety	Free-to-air
Canal 5		Paravisión	Variety	Free-to-air
Canal 8		C9N	Informative	Free-to-air
Canal 9		SNT	Variety	Free-to-air
Canal 11		LaTele	Variety	Free-to-air
Canal 12		Noticias PY	Informative	Free-to-air
Canal 13		Trece	Variety	Free-to-air
Canal 14		Paraguay TV	Variety and Institutional	Free-to-air
Canal 18/27/57		América PY	Variety	Pay television
Canal 24		A24 PY	Informative	Pay television
Canal 50		ABC TV	Variety	Pay television
Canal 500		Hei	Variety	Pay television
Canal 507		Tigo Sports	Sports	Pay television

=== AM and FM radio ===
Radios AM
kHz	AM radio name	City (Greater Asunción)	Topic
AM 650 kHz	Radio Uno	Asunción	Variety
AM 680 kHz	Radio Caritas	Asunción	Religion
AM 730 kHz	Radio Cardinal	Asunción	Informative, Sports
AM 780 kHz	Radio 1° de Marzo	Asunción	Culture
AM 800 kHz	Radio La Unión	Asunción	Variety
AM 920 kHz	Radio Nacional del Paraguay	Asunción	State-owned
AM 970 kHz	Radio Universo	Asunción	Informative, Sports
AM 1000 kHz	Radio Mil	Asunción	Variety
AM 1020 kHz	Radio Ñandutí	Asunción	Variety
AM 1080 kHz	Radio Monumental	Asunción	Variety, Sports
AM 1120 kHz	Radio La Deportiva	Lambaré	Sports
AM 1200 kHz	Radio Libre	Fernando de la Mora	Variety
AM 1250 kHz	Radio Asunción	Asunción	Variety
AM 1330 kHz	Radio Chaco Boreal	Asunción	Informative, Sports
AM 1480 kHz	Radio Iglesia	Asunción	Religion

Radios FM
MHz	FM radio name	City (Greater Asunción)	Topic
FM 87.7 MHz	Radio Medalla Milagrosa	Fernando de la Mora	Religion
FM 91.1 MHz	Estación 40	Asunción	Musical, Magazine
FM 91.5 MHz	Top Milenium	Asunción	Musical
FM 91.9 MHz	HEi Radio	Asunción	Musical
FM 92.3 MHz	Radio Los 40	Asunción	Musical
FM 92.7 MHz	Radio Vibras	Fernando de la Mora	Musical
FM 93.3 MHz	Radio Coeyú	Lambaré	Community
FM 93.5 MHz	Radio Vianney	Lambaré	Religion
FM 94.3 MHz	RQP Paraguay	Asunción	Variety
FM 95.1 MHz	Radio Nacional del Paraguay	Asunción	State-owned
FM 95.5 MHz	Rock & Pop Paraguay	Asunción	Musical
FM 96.5 MHz	Radio Disney Paraguay	Asunción	Juvenile, Magazine
FM 97.1 MHz	Radio Latina Paraguay	Asunción	Variety
FM 99.1 MHz	Radio Corazón	Asunción	Informative
FM 99.9 MHz	Radio La 100	Asunción	Variety
FM 100.1 MHz	Radio Canal 100	Villa Elisa	Variety
FM 100.9 MHz	Radio Montecarlo	Asunción	Culture
FM 101.3 MHz	Radio Farra	Asunción	Musical, Magazine, Variety
FM 102.7 MHz	Radio Aspen	Asunción	Magazine
FM 103.1 MHz	Radio Popular	Asunción	Variety
FM 103.7 MHz	Radio Exclusiva	Lambaré	Musical
FM 105.1 MHz	Radio Venus	Asunción	Informative
FM 106.5 MHz	Radio Palma	Asunción	Musical
FM 106.9 MHz	Radio Urbana	Asunción	Musical
FM 107.3 MHz	Radio María Paraguay	Asunción	Religion

== Sports ==
Association football clubs include Olimpia, Cerro Porteño, Club Libertad, Club Nacional, Club Guaraní and Club Sol de América, which have their own stadiums and sport facilities for affiliated members.

The Defensores del Chaco stadium is the main football stadium of the country and is located in the neighborhood of Sajonia, just a few blocks away from the center of Asunción. Since it is a national stadium sometimes it is used for other activities such as rock concerts. Asunción is also the heart of Paraguayan rugby union. The Estadio General Pablo Rojas of the Cerro Porteño is also located among the main stadiums in the country, being the one with the largest capacity in Paraguay.

Asunción hosted the 2025 Junior Pan American Games and will host the 2031 Pan American Games.

The Ñu Guasú Park is a recreational park.

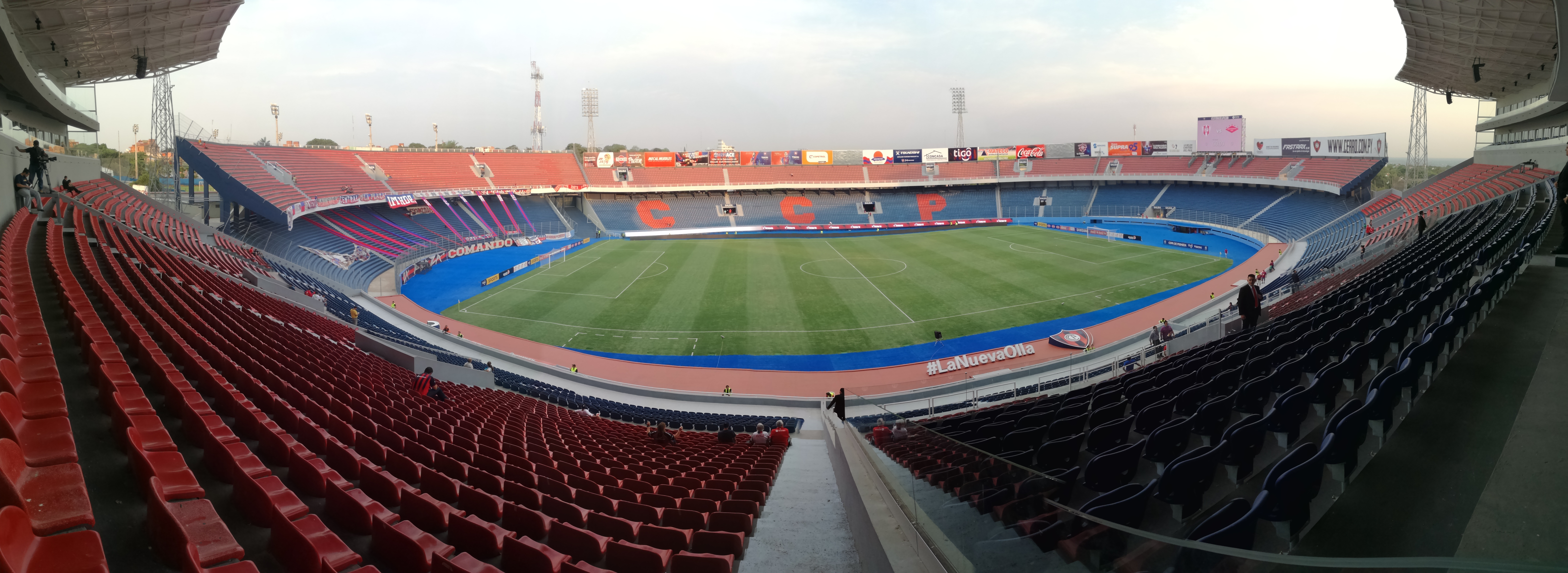
The Estadio General Pablo Rojas is the largest stadium in Paraguay.

== Notable people ==
- Santiago Peña (born 1978), 52nd President of Paraguay
- Leticia Ocampos (born 1980), First Lady of Paraguay
- Attila Sallustro (1908-1983), Italian-Paraguayan footballer
- José Asunción Flores (1904–1972), composer
- Augusto Roa Bastos (1917–2005), writer
- Víctor Pecci (born 1955), tennis player
- Willi Plett (born 1955), ice hockey player
- Horacio Cartes (born 1956), former head of state of Paraguay
- Osvaldo Pangrazio (born 1957), former footballer
- Sharlene Wells Hawkes (born 1964), Paraguayan-American author, singer and reporter
- Feliciana Coronel (1964–1996), lesbian rights activist
- Berta Rojas (born 1966), musician, professor
- Usha Didi Gunatita (1971-2015), drag artist and activist
- Enrique Vera (born 1979) Paraguayan footballer
- Roque Santa Cruz (born 1981), footballer
- Juan Gabriel Benítez (born 1982), FIFA football referee
- Paolo Roberto Ortíz (born 1985), footballer
- Rodrigo Roman (born 1986), Paraguayan footballer
- Mario Saldívar (born 1990), Paraguayan footballer
- Miguel Almiron (born 1994), footballer
- Omar Alderete (born 1996), footballer
- Diana Vicezar (born 2000/2001) Paraguayan technologist
- Erik López (born 2001), footballer
- Joshua Dürksen (born 2003), racing driver
- Mayeli Villalba, photographer
- Mario Abdo Benítez (born 1971), 51st President of Paraguay
- Silvana López Moreira (born 1974), First Lady of Paraguay

== Twin towns – sister cities ==
Asunción is twinned with:

- Andorra la Vella, Andorra
- Argel, Algeria
- Bogotá, Colombia
- Brasília, Brazil
- Brussels, Belgium
- Buenos Aires, Argentina
- Campinas, Brazil
- Canelones, Uruguay
- Chapecó, Brazil
- Caracas, Venezuela
- Chiba, Japan
- Curitiba, Brazil
- Florianópolis, Brazil
- Florida, Uruguay
- La Paz, Bolivia
- Lima, Peru
- Madrid, Spain
- Medellín, Colombia
- Mexico City, México
- Miami-Dade County, United States
- Montevideo, Uruguay
- La Plata, Argentina
- Lyon, France
- (Mexico) Puebla, México
- Quito, Ecuador
- Resistencia, Argentina
- Río Cuarto, Argentina
- Rosario, Argentina
- San José, Costa Rica
- Santa Cruz de la Sierra, Bolivia
- Santiago, Chile
- Santo Domingo, Dominican Republic
- São Paulo, Brazil
- São Vicente, Brazil
- Songpa (Seoul), South Korea
- Taipei, Taiwan
- Tarija, Bolivia
- Vitoria-Gasteiz, Spain
- Yerba Buena, Argentina

=== Cooperation agreements ===
Asunción also cooperates with:

- Mar del Plata, Argentina
- Viña del Mar, Chile
- Brussels, Belgium
- Geneva, Switzerland
- Lyon, France
- Lisbon, Portugal
- European Union

== See also ==
- Ciudad del Este
