= Ypacaraí =

Ypacaraí Ypakarai
- District
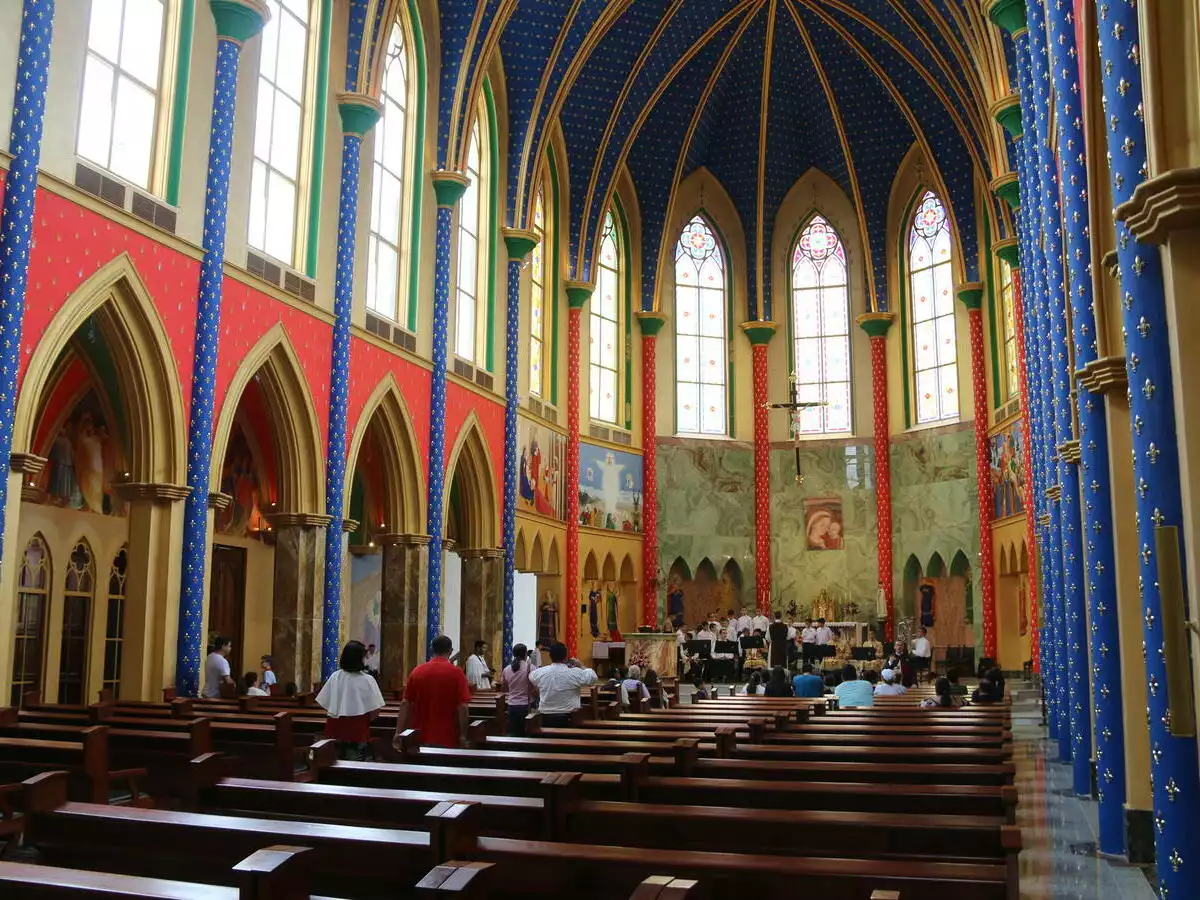
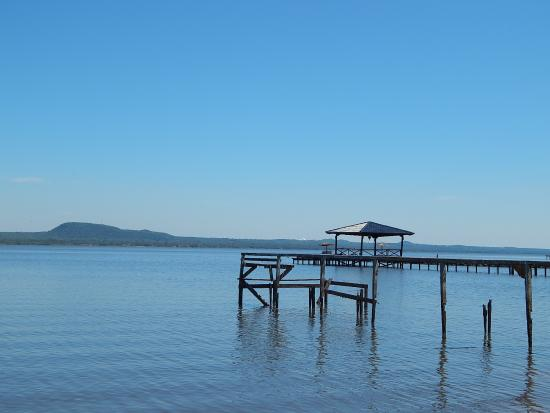
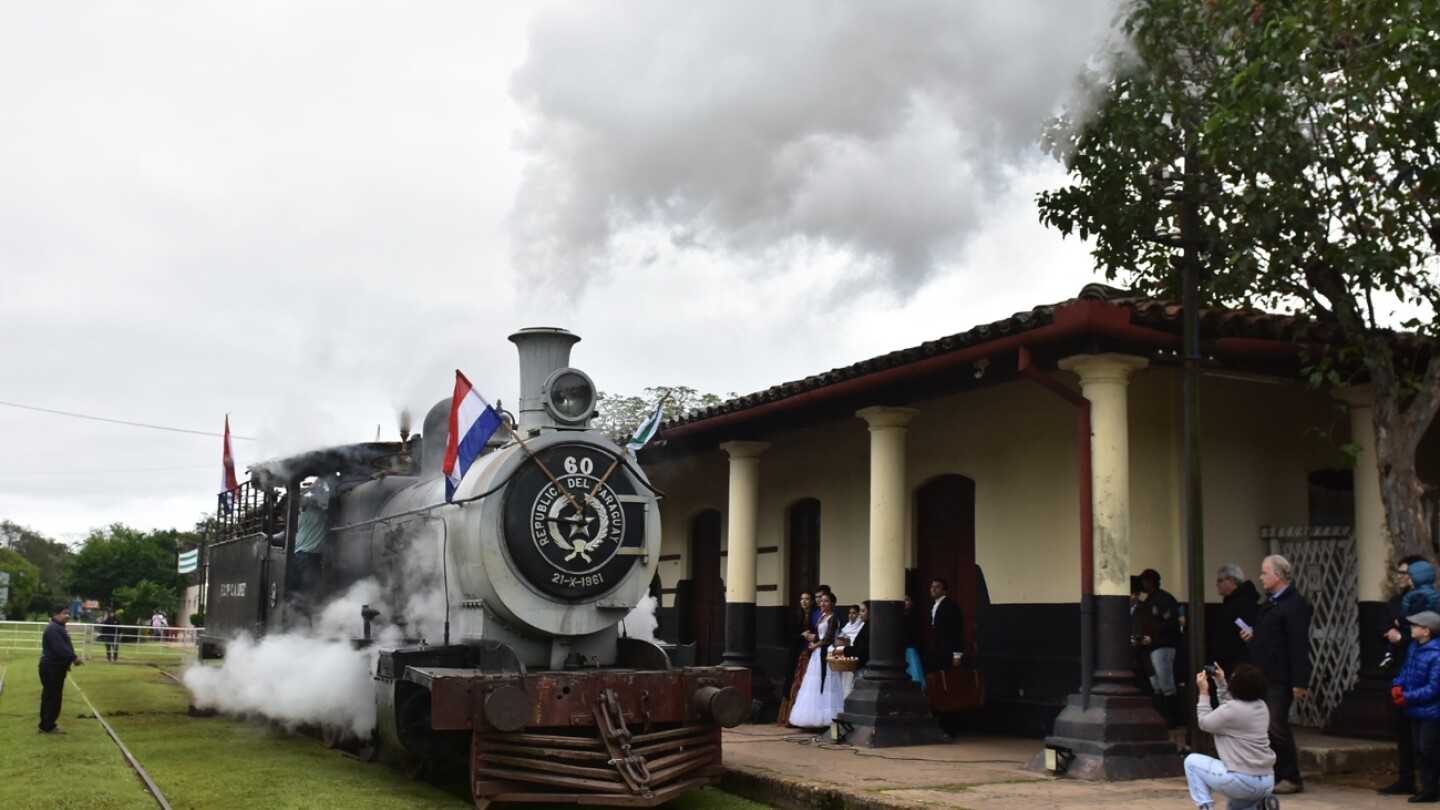
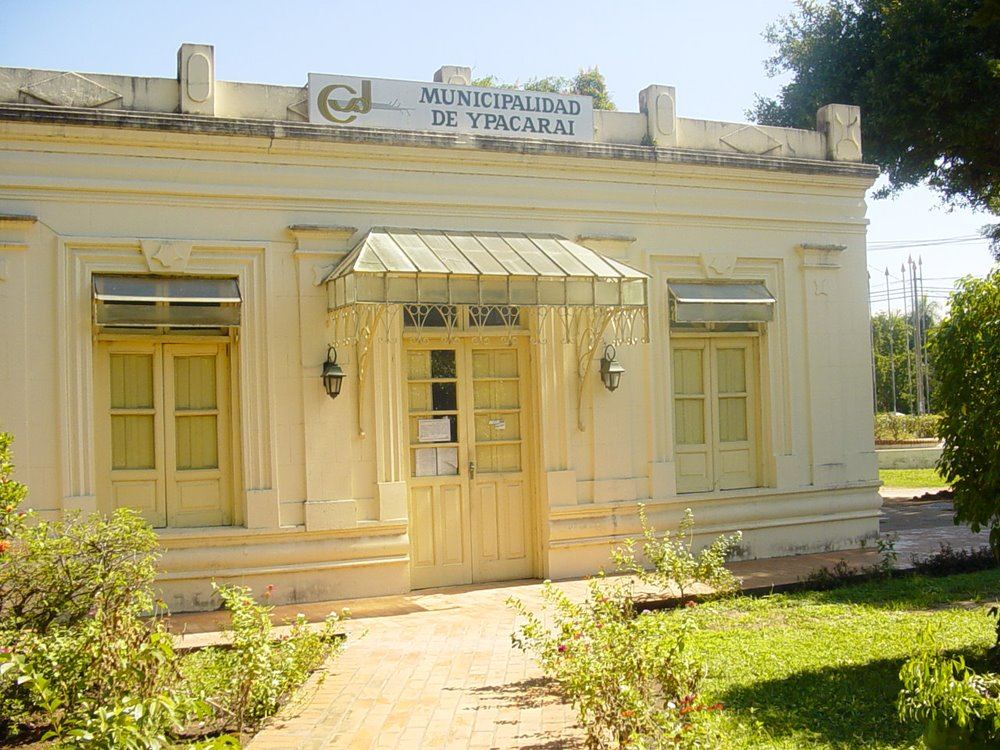
- Clockwise from top: the inside of the Mother of Good Counsel Church, a view of the lake, a train departing from the city's station and the city hall building.

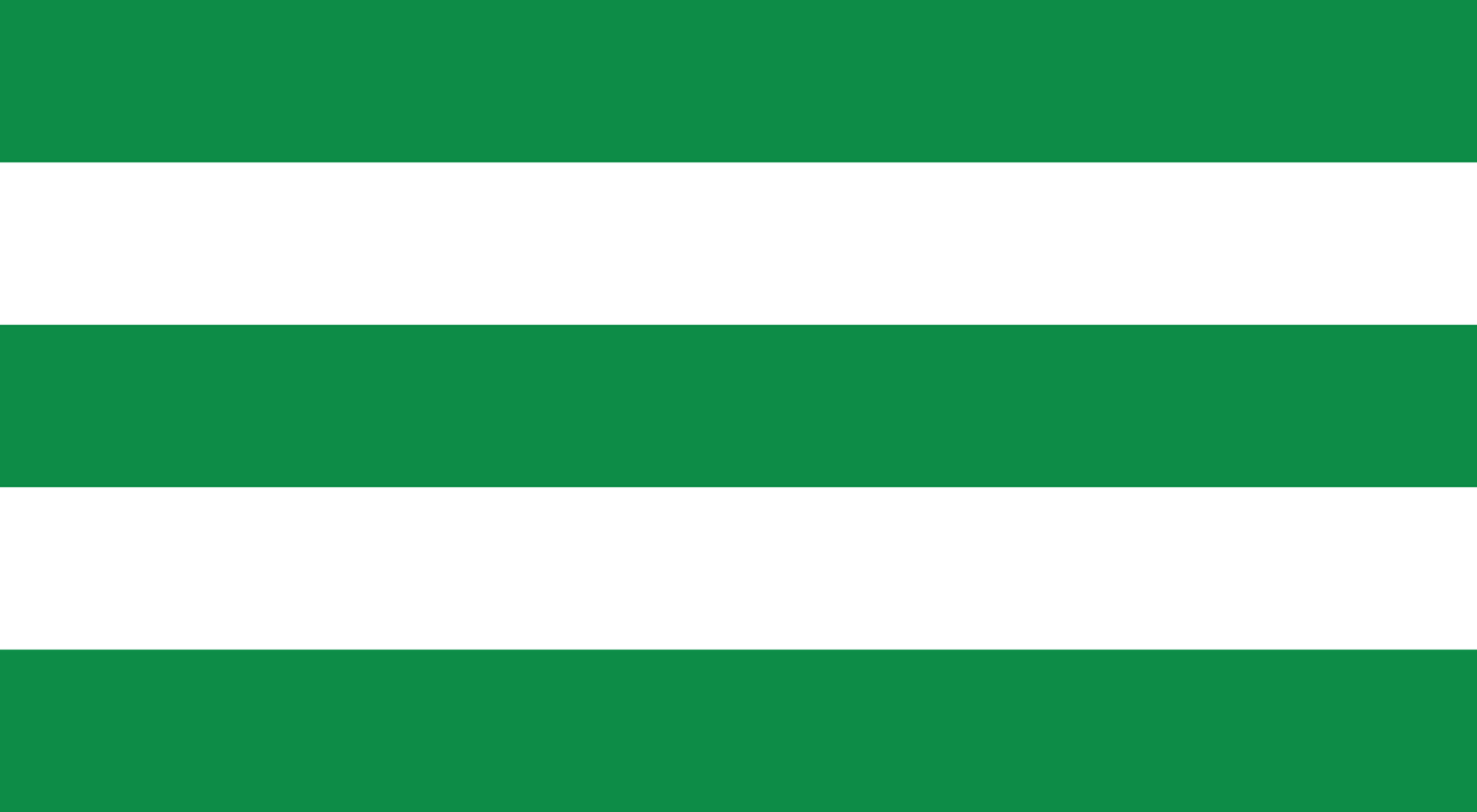
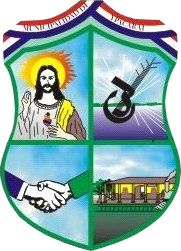
- Flag Coat of arms
- Etymology: Blessed lake
- Nickname(s): City of Folklore
- Location within Paraguay
- Country: Paraguay

Government
  - Mayor: Raúl Fernando Negrete Caballero (PLRA)

Area
  - Total: 111 km^{2} (43 sq mi)
- Elevation: 64.1 m (210 ft)

Population
  - 2023 estimate: 29,578
  - Density: 16.12/km^{2} (41.8/sq mi)
- Time zone: UTC-4
- Calling code: 513
- Website: https://www.municipalidaddeypacarai.gov.py

Ypacaraí (Guarani: Ypakarai) is a town in the Central Department of Paraguay on the Lake Ypacarai. On the Paraguayan highway system, it is located between Asunción and Caacupé, near Areguá and San Bernardino. Known as the "City of Folklore" after the Ypacaraí Festival, it is located on the Ybytypanemá mountain range, which is in the Los Altos mountain range, near the Ypacaraí Lake. In 2020, the village had a population of 28,283, and is 64.1 m above sea level. Notable agricultural crops of the area include tobacco and cotton. Lake Ypacaraí is popular with tourists and locals in the landlocked nation of Paraguay.

== Etymology ==
The city was named after its lake, which got its name from Classical Guarani Ĭpacarai, a compound of ĭpa·b and carai·b meaning "blessed lake," due to missionary Luis de Bolaños' 1603 blessing of the lake to contain its waters, since they flooded all the way to the Valley of Pirayú.

== History ==
The city that already existed at the end of the 17th century – was one of the Itauguá companies, with the name of «Guazú Virá», later changed to «Tacuaral».

On 27 March 1864, the extension of the railway line to the Guazú Virá station was inaugurated, called "Estación Tacuaral" (from there it takes the name of "Tacuaral"), around said station the community grew due to the movement that this generated. Over the years the idea of separating from Itauguá arose and a commission was formed to take the request to the President of the Paraguayan Republic, General Patricio Escobar. This commission was made up of: Lytton Snead, José Galo Guanes, Higinio Escobar, Eustaquio Feliú, David Baruch, Ramón Negrete, Dionisio Pérez and Eliseo Patiño, thus initiating the corresponding procedures.

On 13 September of the year 1887 the creation of "Ypacaraí" was established. The first people to lead the town were Mr. Higinio Escobar as police chief and justice of the peace and Father Adolfo Valenzuela, in charge of religious services. The district was very marginalized during the Stroessner dictatorship, which is why it came to be known as "the capital of folklore and democracy".

== Geography ==
Ypacaraí limits to the west with the departmental capital Areguá, to the south with Itá, to the north with Ypacaraí Lake and to the east with the department of Cordillera . Belonging to the central part and the metropolitan region of the Greater Asunción Area.

=== Hydrography ===
Several streams flow into the lake and they are: Pirayú, Paso Puente, Estrella, Jukury, in turn the waters of the lake flow into the Paraguay River, through the Salado River .

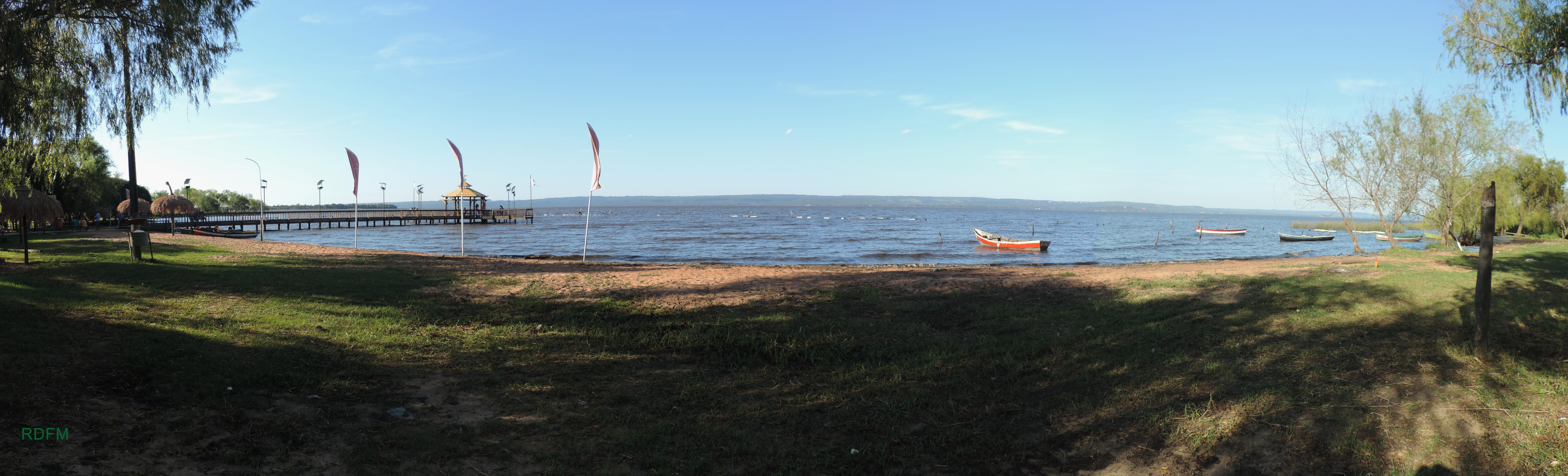
Panoramic view of Ypacaraí Lake, Paraguay.

The Ypacaraí Lake has been an inspiration for locals and others, and as a result of this the song known worldwide as "Memories of Ypacaraí" was born, composed by Zulema de Mirkin and Demetrio Ortiz . This lake has an extension of 22 km from north to south, between 5 and 6 km wide and a depth of 3m, surrounded by lush vegetation.

=== Climate ===
The maximum temperature in the summer, reaches 40 °C, which can rise even more in some occasions. The minimum temperature for winter is −2 °C. The annual average is 22 °C. The rains oscillate in approximately 1433 mm annually. The season with the highest rainfall is between the months of January and April, the rarest being between the months of June to August.

== Economy ==
The main activity is the manufacture of guitars and handicrafts in saddlery, and everything related to leather, blankets, bedspreads and hammocks. There are also several chipa home-made factories.

It has a rich agricultural and industrial activity. Of the latter, the majority is found in Ypacaraí, such as cotton gins, textile and logging industries, and vegetable oil refineries. The already famous Ypacaraí Lake festival, known worldwide, is another economic entry to the city and the expo fair held every year in the historic center of the city.

== Demographics ==
In 2020, the village had a population of 28,283.

== Culture ==
Local cultural sites include the monument to music, a symbol and trophy of the Ypacaraí Festival; the Sacred Heart of Jesus Church; and the "House of Culture: Teodoro S. Mongelós". The cultural center contains a mausoleum holding the remains of Teodoro S. Mongelós and Demetrio Ortiz, creator of "Memories of Ypacaraí", as well as the "Memoria Ypacaraiense" museum, which exhibits objects from the war of 70 and items associated with notable local people.

Francisco Gaona, educator, social activist, trade unionist and historian, author of the book called "Introduction to the Guild and Social History of Paraguay", was born in this city in 1901.

It is worth highlighting the history of Luisón de Tacuaral, a legend that originated in Cerrito, a place adjacent to the city.

The Paraguayan rock bands of Salamandra and Bohemia Urbana, of great national and international diffusion, are originally from this city, where they also usually record takes for their video clips.

The public square; considered as the main axis of the cultural and historical heritage of the city, it is connected to the Station and the House of Culture.

=== Religion ===
The Sacred Heart of Jesus parish is the main church of the city along with the convent of the house of the Franciscan sisters and the Shrine of the Virgin of Schoenstatt of Tuparendá; replica of the sanctuary of the one in Germany, with an infrastructure to house several groups, it has a beautiful vegetation, a major construction is currently being carried out. We also find the Salesian Church of Don Bosco; There is also the house of the "Salesian Family".

=== Sports ===
On the occasion of the National Bicentennial of the Republic of Paraguay, the government inaugurated in 2010 the National Bicentennial Stadium of Ypacaraí.

== Sister cities ==
Ypacaraí is twinned with:

- Santa Fe, Argentina (1978)
- San Gregorio de Polanco, Uruguay

== Notable people ==
- Carlos Gamarra, footballer

== Gallery ==
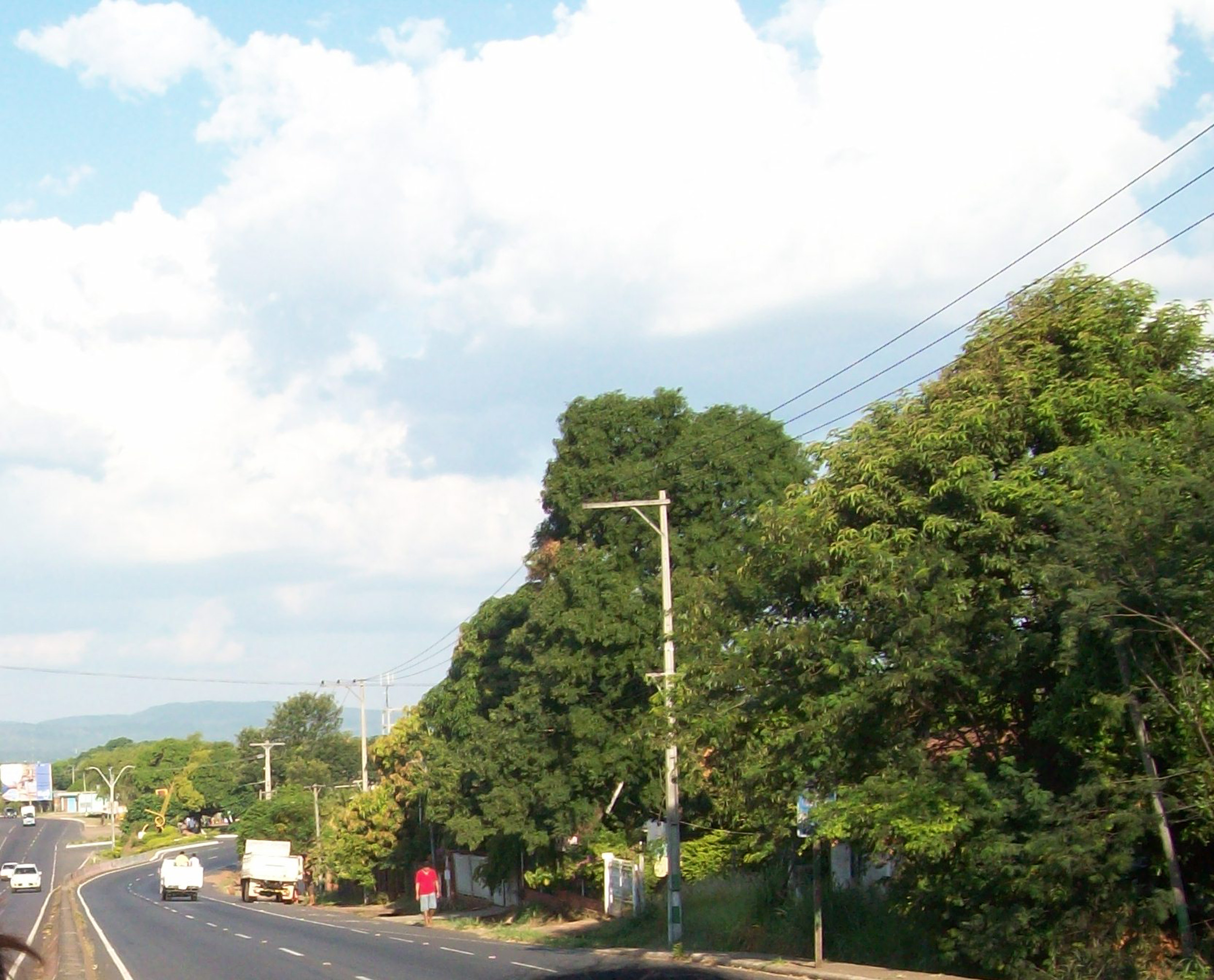
The entrance to the city of Ypacaraí, Paraguay

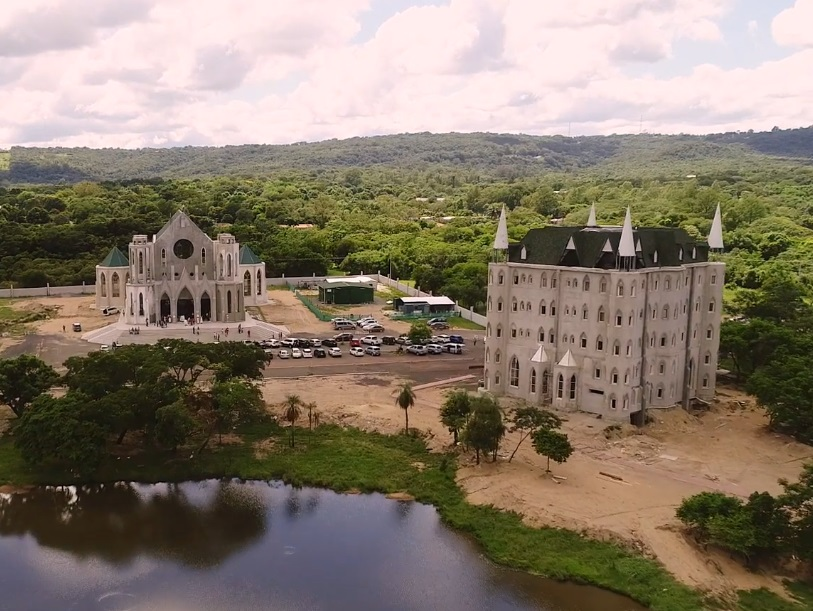
The Heralds of the Gospel Church in Ypacaraí

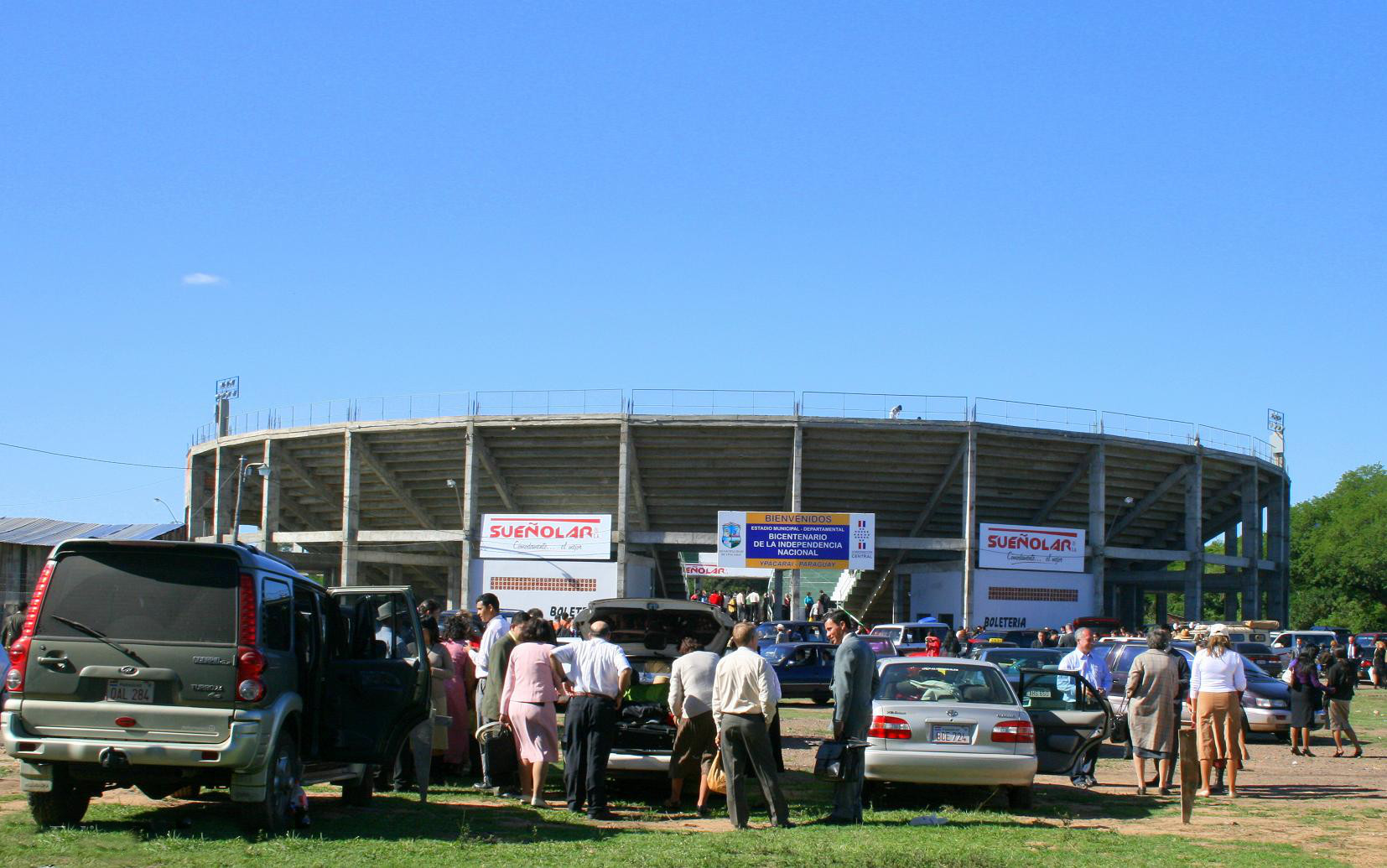
Bicentennial Stadium of Ypacaraí, Paraguay

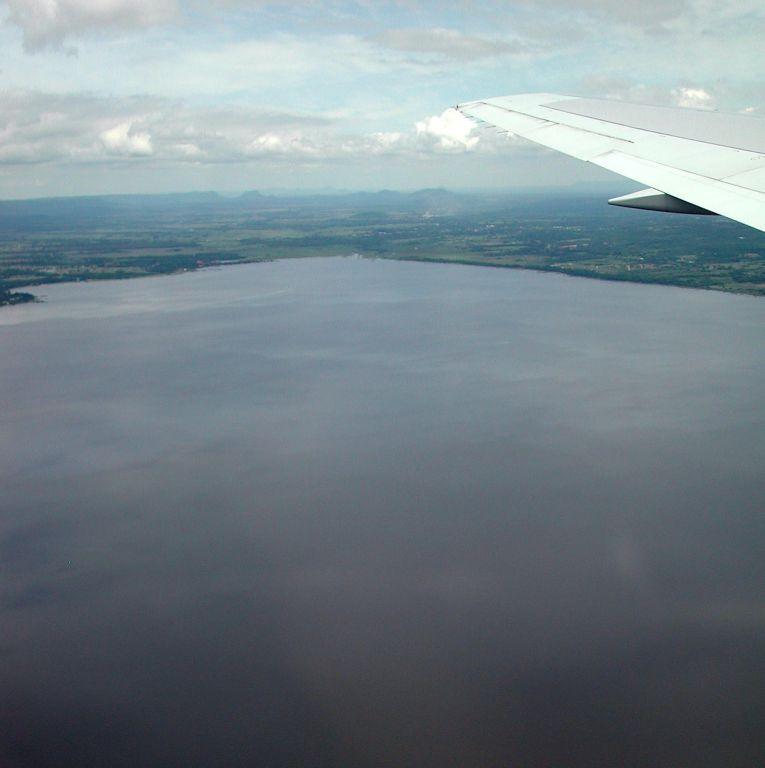
Ypacaraí Lake, Ypacaraí, Paraguay
