= Santa María (Asunción) =

Coordinates: 25.3018°S 57.5496°W

- Barrio
- Interactive map of Santa María
- Country: Paraguay
- Autonomous Capital District: Gran Asunción
- City: Asunción

Santa María is a neighbourhood (barrio) of Asunción, Paraguay. It is roughly 0.65 square kilometres with a population of over 4200 residents.
