= Ypacaraí Lake =

Lake in Paraguay

Ypacarai Lake
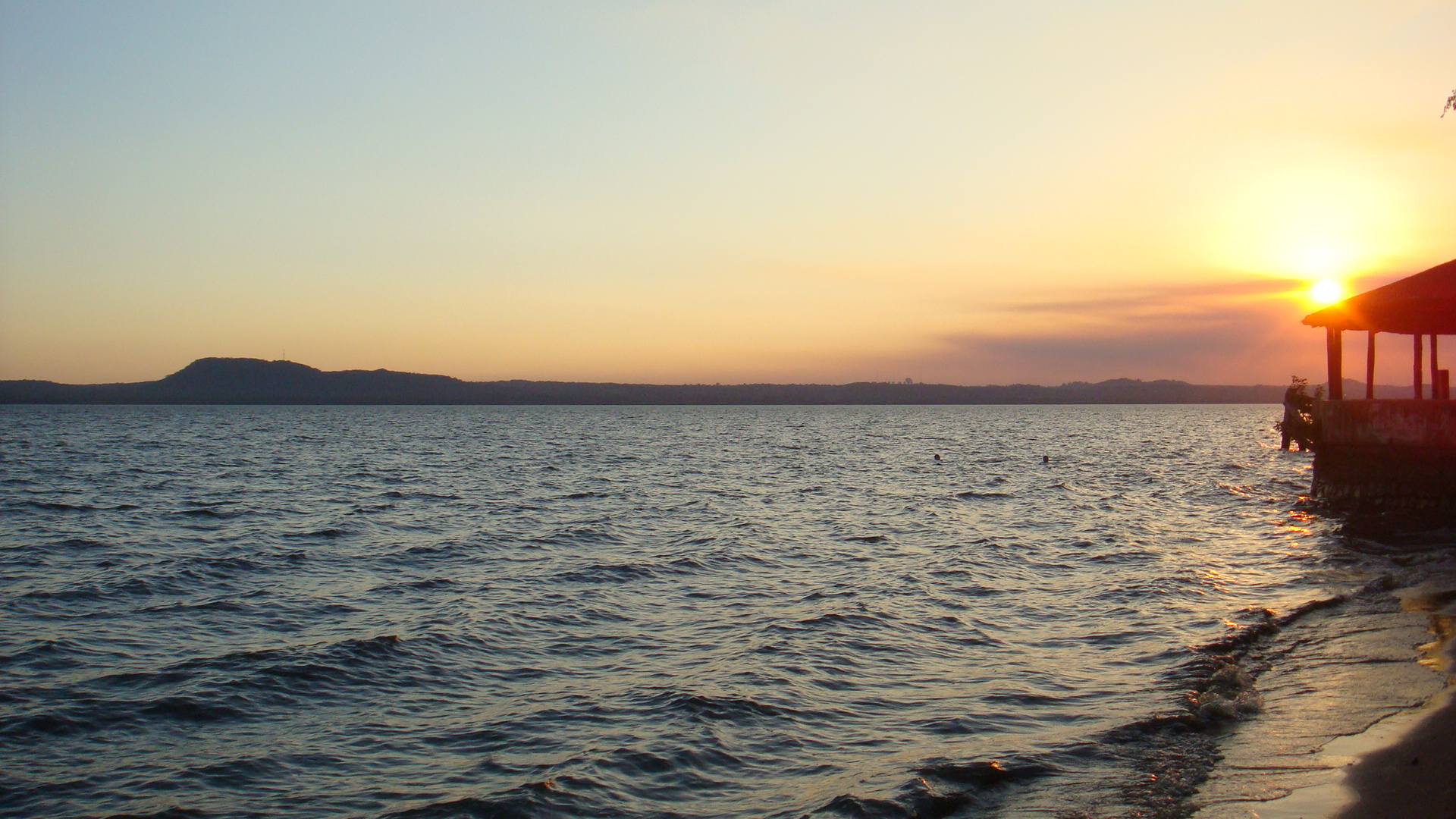
- View of the lake from San Bernardino

- Location within Paraguay
- Location: Central Department
- Coordinates: 25°18′0″S 57°21′0″W
- Primary outflows: Salado River
- Basin countries: Paraguay
- Max. length: 14.9 mi (24.0 km)
- Max. width: 3.7 mi (6.0 km)
- Surface area: 55.9 km^{2} (21.6 sq mi)
- Average depth: 10 feet (3.0 m)
- Settlements: San Bernardino, Ypacaraí & Areguá

Ypacaraí Lake is a major body of water located in Paraguay, about 50 kilometres (31 mi) east of the capital, Asunción. The lake lies in the western part of the Asunción-Sapucai-Villarrica graben, a tectonic depression from the Mesozoic Era, and drains to the northwest through the Salado River into the Paraguay River. It is surrounded by three cities: Areguá, Ypacaraí, and San Bernardino, the last two (Costa Lago and Asunción) being located on its shore. It is one of Paraguay's two main lakes, providing water for drinking and irrigation, and is also the site of many leisure activities.

As a result of the proliferation of toxic algae or cyanobacteria, as well as nearby livestock farms, residential areas, large-scale deforestation, and land development, the lake is the most polluted in Paraguay. Due to the contamination, the lake has turned green and swimming in the lake is not advised.

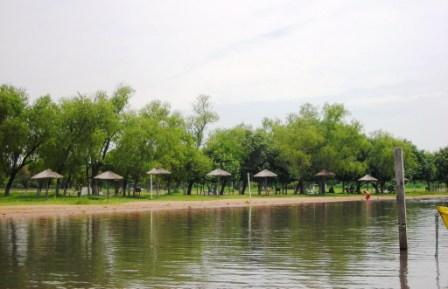
Areguá beach

== Geography ==
Ypacaraí Lake is located in the Salado River Basin, a low-elevation point. The area of the lake is about 90 km^{2} (35 sq mi). It is 24 km (15 mi) long north-south and 6 km (3.7 mi) long east-west. The average depth of the water is roughly 1.72 metres (5.6 ft).

The lake flows into the Salado River, which itself enters the Paraguay River and receives water from various bodies of water such as the Yagua Resau, Yuquyry, Puente Estrella, and Pirayu.

== Weather and climate ==
The Salado River Basin, where the lake is located, has a humid subtropical climate. The weather at the lake is mainly warm and sunny days are frequent. Temperature varies between 20 and 38 °C (68 and 100 °F) during the summer and 3 to 25 °C (37 to 77 °F) during the winter.

== History ==
The lake's original name was Tapycua. There are several possible explanations for the name. Ypacaraí means "holy lake" and is linked to the legend of the blessing of the lake by Luis de Bolaños around 1600.

== Art and culture ==
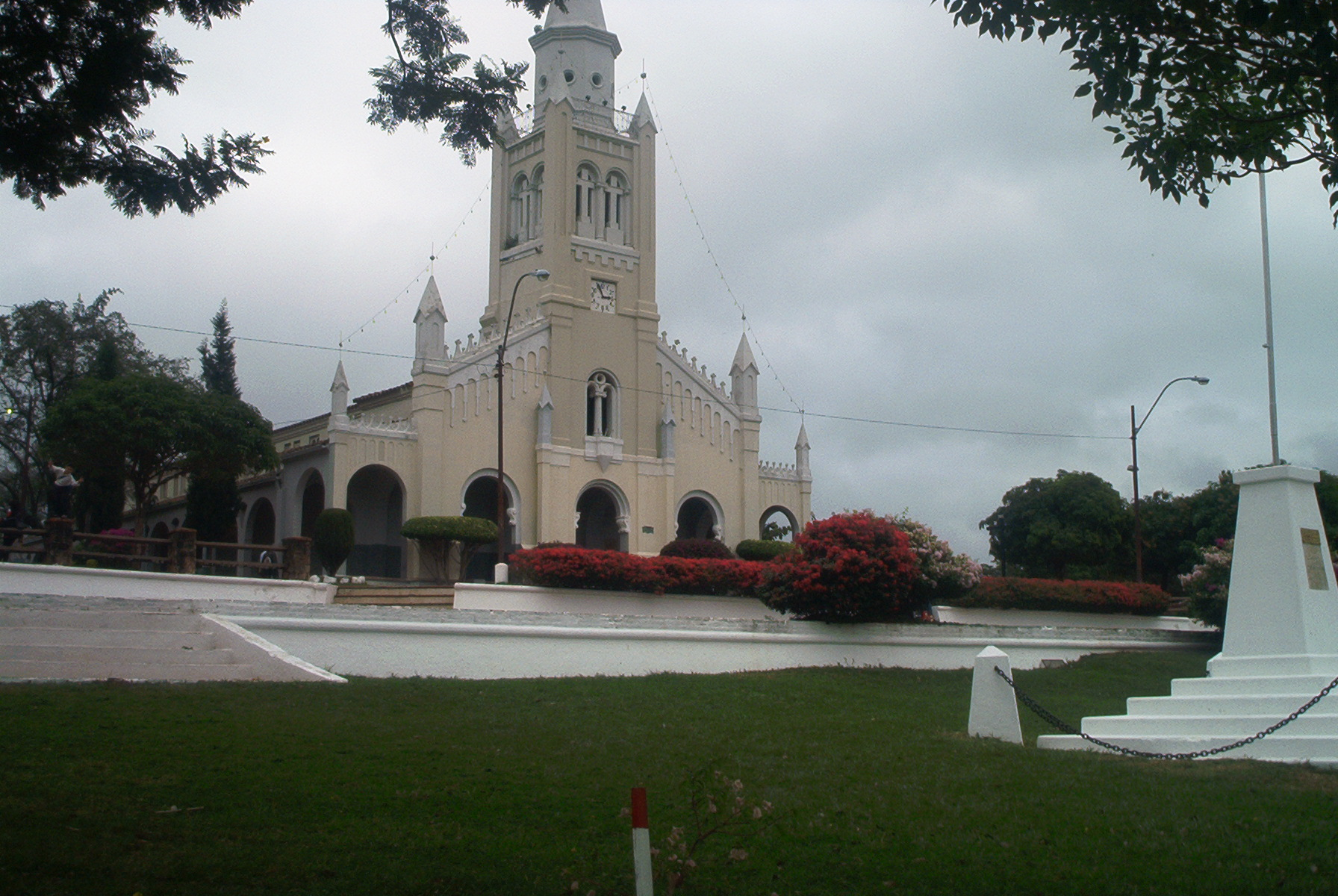
Iglesia de la Candelaria, Areguá

Lake Ypacarai is internationally known because of the song “Recuerdos de Ypacarai” ("Memories of Ypacarai") written by Demetrio Ortiz. The song has been performed and recorded by many singers, including Julio Iglesias.

The nearby town of Areguá offers permanent art and crafts exhibitions. The artisan center of La Cuenca hosts a fair where local artists exhibit their work. Visitors and tourists can obtain information at the cultural center Estacion A; there is also an art center, the Guaggari Center, which is located at the entrance to the city and includes a sculpture exhibition. La Casa de la Cultura is a historical museum where temporary exhibitions are also presented. It opens for the Ypacaraí Festival that takes place in September.

Ypacaraí Festival has been held every year in the city of Ypacaraí since 1971. The September gathering hosts folk expression and Paraguayan art, including concerts, dance and theater. According to the City Chamber, the festival “tries to rescue and reinforce the artistic heritage of the Paraguayan culture”. Casa Hassler, a cultural center, is open for the whole year, with permanent and temporary exhibitions. Artists can show their work here for free, and there is also a history museum, a public library and classes in acting and dance.

== Tourism ==
The lake is surrounded by cities with facilities for tourists and other visitors. Its beaches are open to the public.

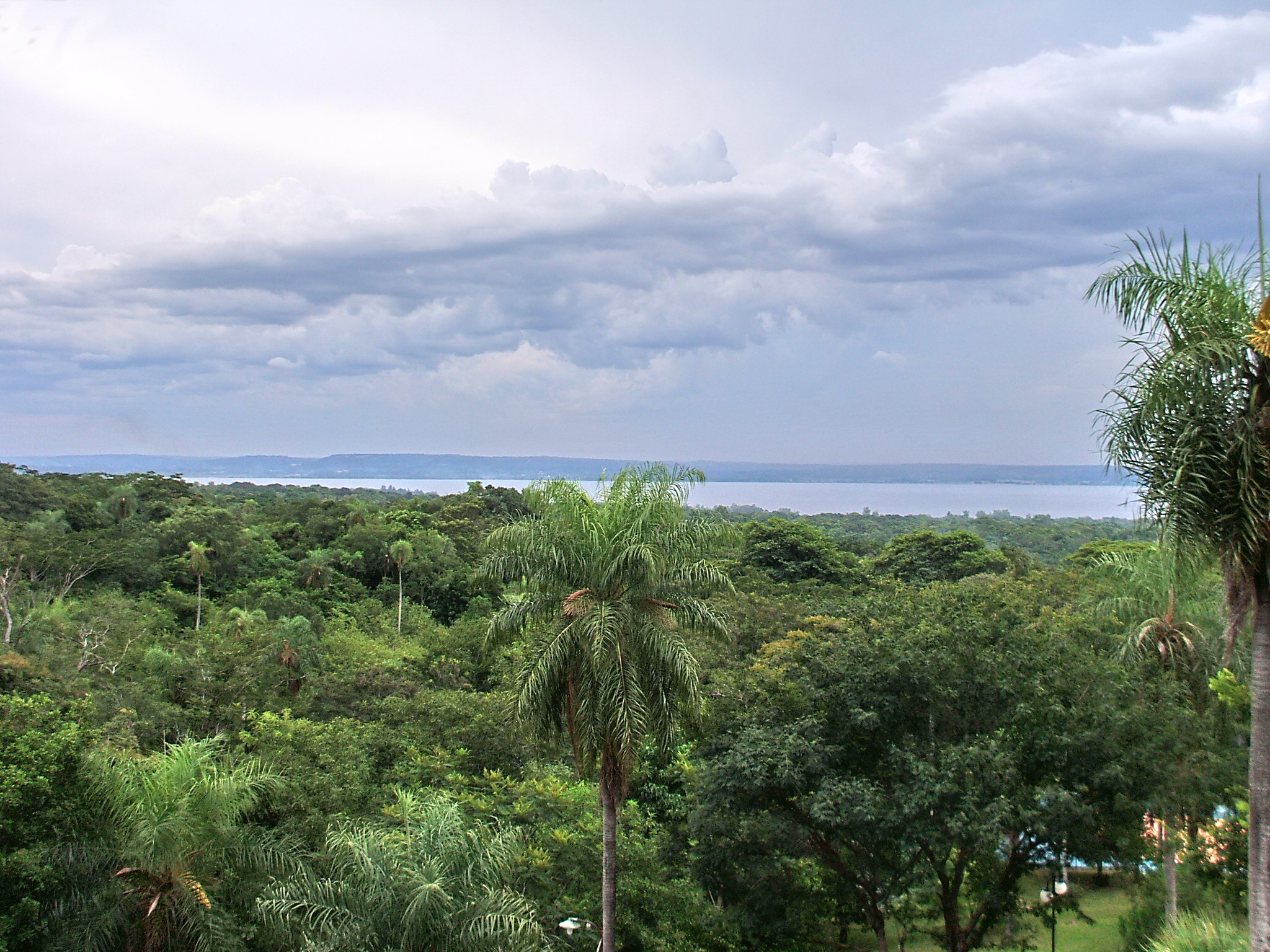
View from San Bernardino

=== San Bernardino ===
This city is 48 km (30 mi) from Asunción. It has beaches, cultural centers, pubs, and restaurants. San Bernardino is also called the “Summer City” because of its facilities and attractions for visitors during that season.

=== Areguá ===
Areguá is 31 km (19 mi) from Asunción. It is a favorite place for writers and famous people. There is also a public beach. Areguá holds fairs throughout the year where local artisans sell pottery and other goods.

== Travel ==
The lake is visible when visiting one of the surrounding cities. Buses depart to San Bernardino and Ypacaraí from the Asunción Bus Terminal, and there is a bus to Areguá from Avenida San Martín or Aviadores del Chaco in Asunción.
