= Ytay =

Coordinates: 25.2966°S 57.5438°W

- Barrio
- Coat of arms
- Interactive map of Ytay
- Country: Paraguay
- Autonomous Capital District: Gran Asunción
- City: Asunción

Area
  - Total: 1.46 km^{2} (0.56 sq mi)
- Elevation: 43 m (141 ft)

Population
  - Total: 2,691

Ytay is a neighbourhood (barrio) of Asunción, Paraguay.
