= Bella Vista (Asunción) =

- Barrio
- Location within Paraguay
- Country: Paraguay
- Autonomous Capital District: Gran Asunción
- City: Asunción

Bella Vista is a neighbourhood (barrio) of Asunción, Paraguay.
