= Virgen de Fátima (Asunción) =

Coordinates: 25°15′S 57°35′W

- Barrio
- Interactive map of Virgen de Fátima
- Country: Paraguay
- Autonomous Capital District: Gran Asunción
- City: Asunción

Virgen de Fátima is a neighbourhood (barrio) of Asunción, the capital and largest city of Paraguay.
