= Central Department =

Department of Paraguay

Central Department Departamento Central (Spanish) Tetãvore Sentral (Guarani)
- Department
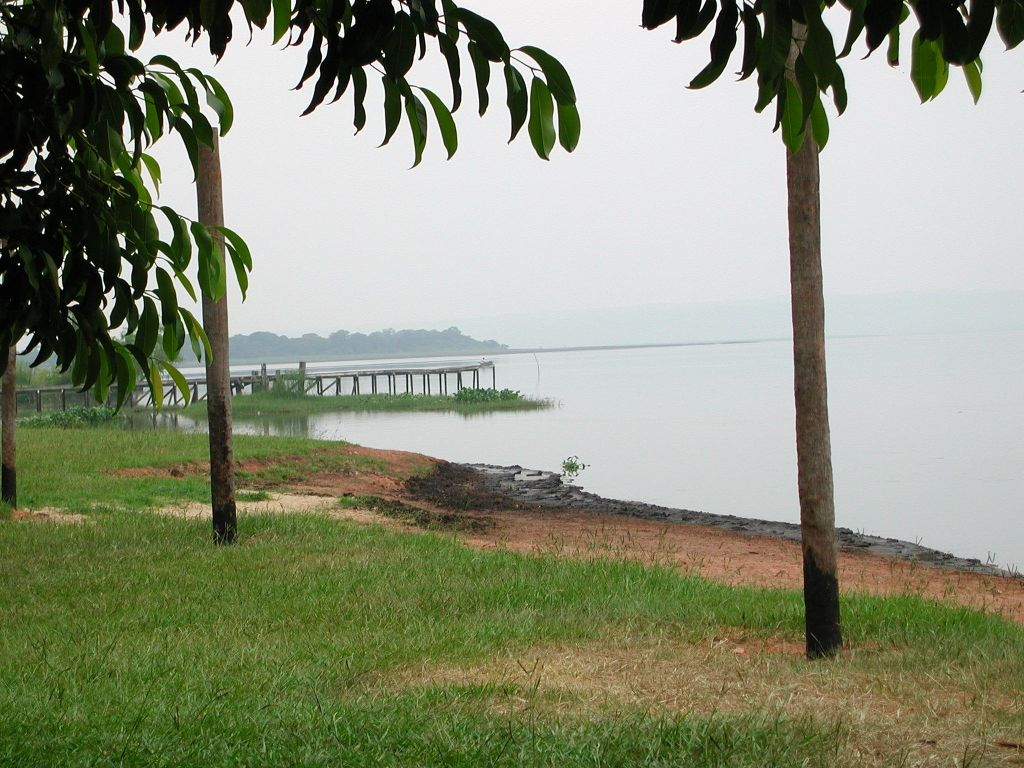
- Areguá – Ypacaraí lake

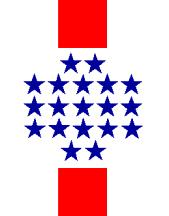
- Flag Coat of arms

- Central shown in red
- Coordinates: 25°18′S 57°25′W
- Country: Paraguay
- Region: Eastern Region
- Established: 1935
- Capital: Areguá
- Largest city: Luque

Government
  - Governor: Ricardo Estigarribia (PLRA)

Area
  - Total: 2,465 km^{2} (952 sq mi)
  - Rank: 17

Population (2022 census)
  - Total: 1,883,927
  - Rank: 1
  - Density: 764.3/km^{2} (1,979/sq mi)
- Time zone: UTC-03 (PYT)
- ISO 3166 code: PY-11
- Number of Districts: 19

Central (Spanish pronunciation: [senˈtɾal]) is a department in Paraguay. Its capital is situated in Areguá. With more than 1.8 million inhabitants, it is the most populated of the 17 departments of Paraguay. It is also the smallest department, with a total area of 2,465 square kilometres (952 mi^{2}).

== Geography ==
Central consists of a mountainous area named Altos as well as some bodies of water. These include the Paraguay and the Salado rivers, the Ypacaraí and Ypoá lakes, and the Cabral pond. The potential resources of this region, along with other regions in the south section, contribute to diverse economic activities such as tourism and agriculture.

=== Surrounding areas ===
- North: the Cordillera and Presidente Hayes departments
- West: the capital district, Asunción, and the Argentine province of Formosa separated by the Paraguay River
- East: the Paraguarí department
- South: the Ñeembucú department

=== Districts ===
The department is divided in 19 districts. They are as follows:

| District | Area (in km^{2}) | Population (2022) |
|---|---|---|
| Areguá | 114 | 70,298 |
| Capiatá | 88 | 236,999 |
| Fernando de la Mora | 20 | 110,255 |
| Guarambaré | 30 | 27,695 |
| Itá | 182 | 69,049 |
| Itauguá | 126 | 93,213 |
| Julián Augusto Saldívar | 32 | 60,162 |
| Lambaré | 27 | 127,150 |
| Limpio | 110 | 139,652 |
| Luque | 152 | 259,705 |
| Mariano Roque Alonso | 40 | 85,133 |
| Nueva Italia | 386 | 9,941 |
| Ñemby | 29 | 116,383 |
| San Antonio | 23 | 57,843 |
| San Lorenzo | 56 | 225,395 |
| Villa Elisa | 18 | 71,383 |
| Villeta | 868 | 35,941 |
| Ypacaraí | 111 | 21,030 |
| Ypané | 53 | 66,700 |

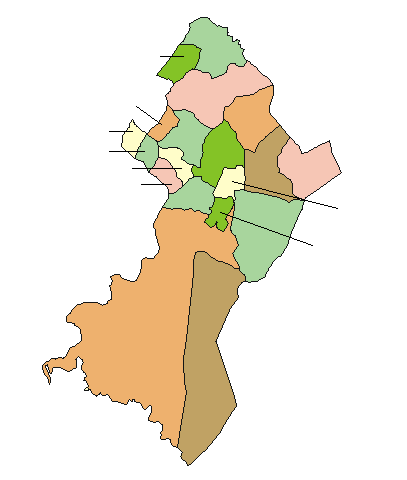

=== Climate ===
Central experiences high temperatures in the summer, the maximum reaching 40 °C and higher. In the winter, the minimum temperature reaches 0 °C. The annual average temperature is 22 °C.

Rainfall varies and is approximately 1433mm per year. The period between the months of January and February is the wettest, and the driest period is between the months of June and August.

=== Hydrology ===
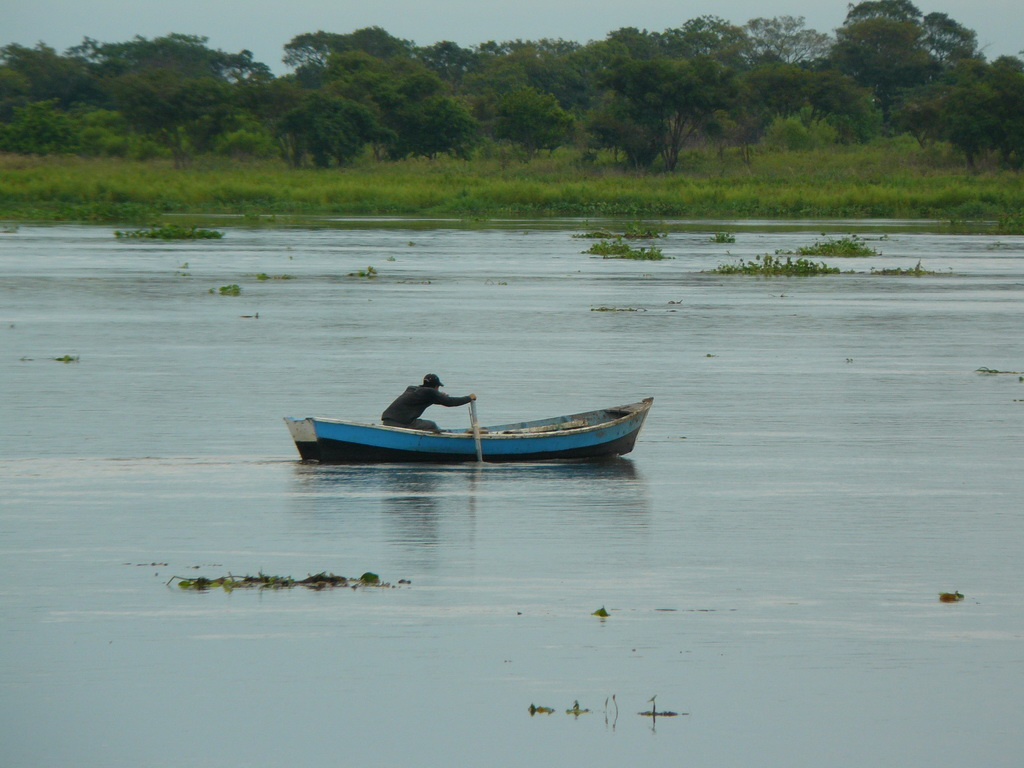
Villeta – View of the Paraguay River

The department is mainly watered by the Paraguay River and its affluents: the Salado River, which is flowed by the Ypacaraí Lake and the streams Itay, Paray e Ytororó. The streams Yuquyry and Ñanduá drain into the Ypoá wetlands. The Ypacaraí and Ypoá lakes and the lagoon Cabral are situated here.

=== Orography ===
The spurs of the Ybytypanema hills, part of the Los Altos chain, are in this department. Its highest hills are Lambaré, Ñanduá and Arrua-í. Other lower hills in the zone are the Ñemby and the Patiño hills.

== History ==
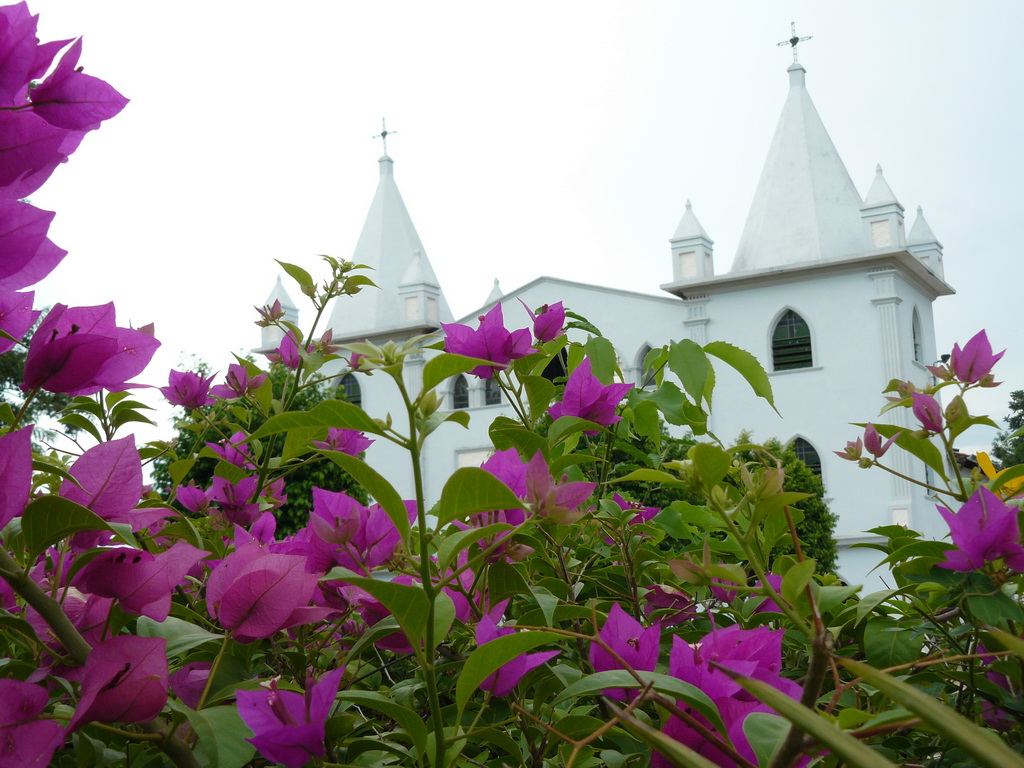
San Antonio

The Central Department, known as "Comarca Asuncena", is historically the most populated region in the country. During the colonization of Paraguay, this region was the center from where new foundations were expanded, as well as refuge of settlers who were escaping from the attacks of the Guaicurú Indians.

The towns in this department have various origins. One of the main figures of these foundations was Domingo Martínez de Irala, who gave rise to the Itá and Areguá districts. The Luque town was established as a Spanish village. Villeta and Tapuá cities were founded in order to establish military forts for defence.

Others tows like Capiatá and Itauguá were expanded around chapels used as evangelization centers. The towns in the department are bound, partly, due to the Chaqueños Indians' resistance against the Spanish conquest of their lands, which forced the settlers to emigrate and take refuge in this part of the region. That was how villages including Guarambaré, Ypané, and Ñemby were established.

The towns of Nueva Italia, Colonia Thompson and Villa Elisa had a different origin, established as agricultural colonies in the 19th century and beginnings of the 20th, and mainly settled by foreign immigrants.

By 1985, the last district in the Central Department, Juan Augusto Saldívar, had been established.

== Transportation ==
=== Routes ===
By being part of the metropolitan area of the country's capital, this department has many routes. Most of the routes of the country leave from Asunción to the country towns.

National route PY01 links the capital city with southern Paraguay; PY02 connects the capital with eastern Paraguay, which borders Brazil; PY03 connects this metro area with the northern departments, while PY19 connects it primarily with western Ñeembucú.

=== Airports ===
The main airport is the Silvio Pettirossi International Airport, located in the town of Luque, which links the department with the rest of the country and the world.

=== Waterway ===
The waterways in the Central Department are determined by the Río Paraguay, with its main affluents being those of Asunción and Villeta.

== Economy ==
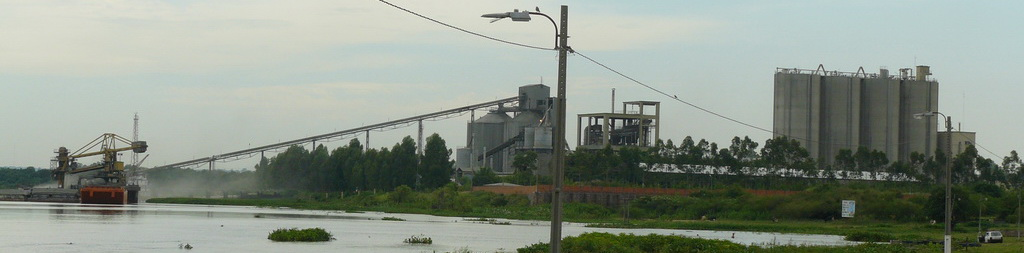
Concrete factories in Villeta

Of the 3,049 industrial plants in the Paraguayan territory, 1,558 are found in the Central department. The department's industrial production includes food processing, furniture, clothing, pharmaceuticals, metallurgy, plastic, and ceramics. Villeta is home to a large number of industries. Central is the second biggest economy of Paraguay, and occupies the second place in attraction of inversions from other countries. 62% of the population is considered economically active.

== Communications ==
AM radio stations include Radio Cardinal, Radio Ñandutí, Radio Nanawa, and Radio Libre. There are also numerous television channels and cable transmission services.

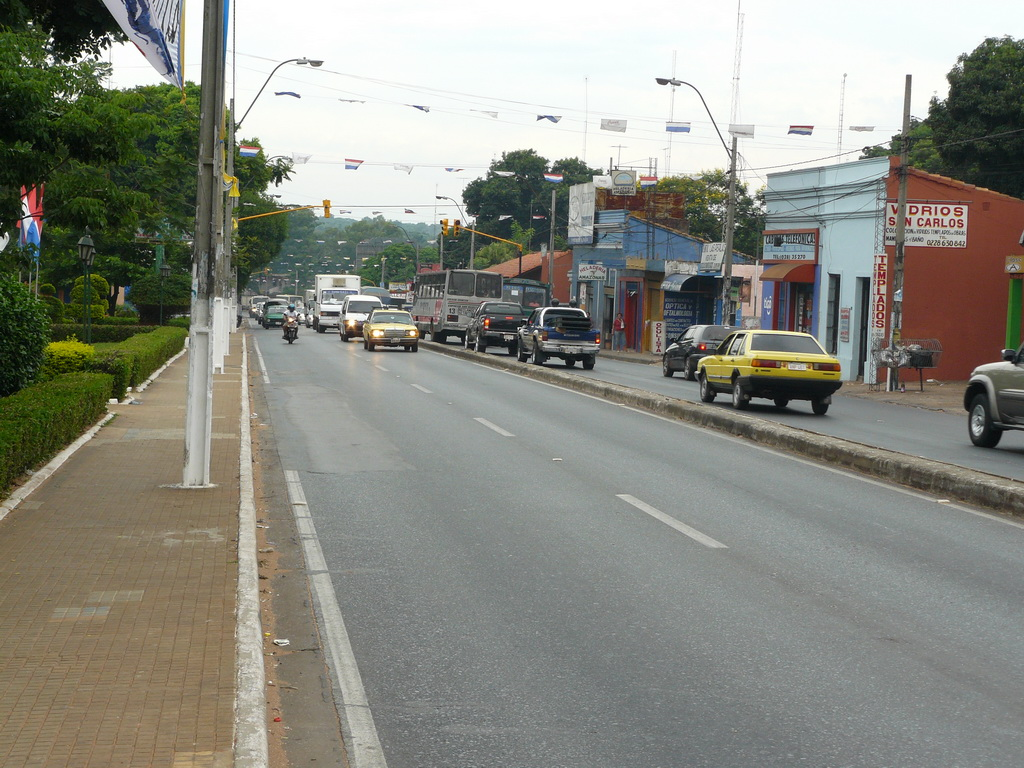
Capiatá

The Satellite Station is situated in Areguá. The Central Department has telephone exchanges capable of communicating with all the districts.

== Health ==
The department has numerous places where residents can receive healthcare, such as hospitals, health posts, and centers. The private sector takes part in this area as well, offering health services in every district of the department.

== Education ==
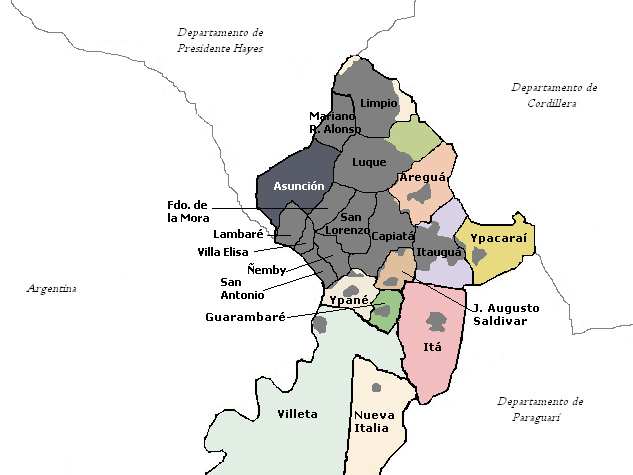
Conurbation of Gran Asunción

Central has one of the nation's highest enrollment rates (84%) for elementary and secondary education for children and youth from age 7 through age 18. More boys are enrolled compared to girls, by a margin of 6%. More students attend public schools (69.9%) compared to private schools (30.1%). The Central Department has around 750 elementary education institutions and about 350 secondary education institutions. San Lorenzo is home to two important educational institutions: the state-run Universidad Nacional de Asunción and the Regional Education Center Saturio Rios, which includes a teacher training college, secondary school, and primary schools that serve as "lab schools".
