= Mbocayaty (Asunción) =

- Barrio
- Flag Coat of arms
- Interactive map of Mbocayaty
- Country: Paraguay
- Autonomous Capital District: Gran Asunción
- City: Asunción

Area
  - Total: 2.04 km^{2} (0.79 sq mi)
- Elevation: 43 m (141 ft)

Population
  - Total: 6,110
  - Density: 3,000/km^{2} (7,760/sq mi)
- Website: http://www.mca.gov.py

Mbocayaty is a neighbourhood (barrio) of Asunción, Paraguay.

== History ==
According to reports obtained by older neighbors, the neighborhood Mbocayaty began to be populated in 1929, the first occupants being the families Meza, Arce and Leon. The area was deserted, as there were no streets, only little paths traced by the settlers. There were coconut plantations, which has possibly given rise to the name of the district, whose name is Mbocayaty.

== Geography ==
=== Climate ===
The climate is tropical, with the average temperature being 28 °C in summer and 19°C in the winter. The neighborhood has prevailing winds from the north and south. The average annual rainfall is 1700mm.
