= Banco San Miguel =

Coordinates: 25°16′S 57°37′W

- Barrio
- Interactive map of Banco San Miguel
- Country: Paraguay
- Autonomous Capital District: Gran Asunción
- City: Asunción

Banco San Miguel is a neighbourhood (barrio) of Asunción, Paraguay.
