= Panambí Verá (Asunción) =

- Barrio
- Country: Paraguay
- Autonomous Capital District: Gran Asunción
- City: Asunción

Panambí Verá is a neighbourhood (barrio) of Asunción, the capital and largest city of Paraguay.
