= Itá Pytã Punta =

Coordinates: 25°17′S 57°40′W

- Barrio
- Interactive map of Itá Pytã Punta
- Country: Paraguay
- Autonomous Capital District: Gran Asunción
- City: Asunción

Itá Pytã Punta is a neighbourhood (barrio) of Asunción, the capital and largest city of Paraguay.
