= Tembetary =

Coordinates: 25°18′S 57°35′W

- Barrio
- Interactive map of Tembetary
- Country: Paraguay
- Autonomous Capital District: Gran Asunción
- City: Asunción

Tembetary is a neighbourhood (barrio) of Asunción, Paraguay. In 2022, it had a population of 2,458 people.
