= Villeta, Paraguay =

City in Central Department, Paraguay

Villeta
- City
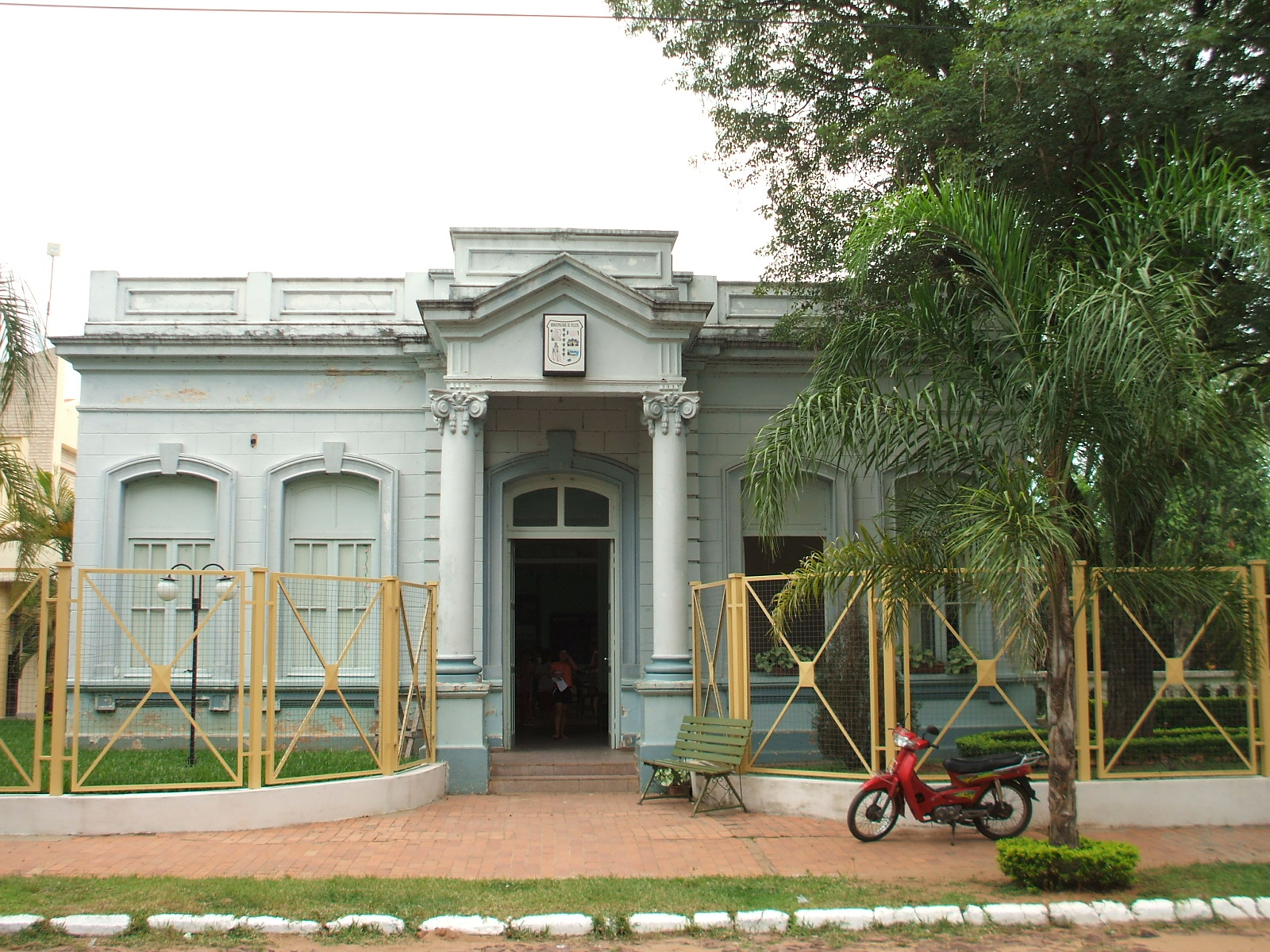
- Villeta, Paraguay

- Location within Paraguay
- Coordinates: 25°30′36″S 57°33′36″W
- Country: Paraguay
- Department: Central
- Founded: March 5, 1714

Government
  - Intendente Municipal: Teodosio Gómez Ibáñez (PLRA)

Area
  - Total: 888 km^{2} (343 sq mi)
- Elevation: 55 m (180 ft)

Population (2016)
  - Total: 36,985
  - Density: 25/km^{2} (65/sq mi)
- Time zone: -4 Gmt
- Postal code: 2680
- Area code: +595 225
- Climate: Cfa

Villeta is a city of Paraguay in the Central Department, on the banks of Paraguay River. It is an important industrial center and port.

== Toponymy ==
The city was founded on March 5, 1714, by Juan Gregorio Bazán de Pedraza, with the original name of San Felipe de Borbón del Valle del Bastán (Saint Philip of Bourbon of the Valley of Bastán), in homage to the King Felipe II. It was later renamed Villeta because of its resemblance to a great Villa.

== Villeta's port ==
The port is administered by the National Administration for Navigation and Ports (ANNP), and is specially equipped for the handling of heavy machinery. Many different kinds of merchandise are traded through this port. In Villeta, there's also the Caacupé-mí Port, one of the most important private ports in Paraguay.

Characteristics:

- Villeta port terminal: 35 kilometers south from Asunción
- Area: 13.5 hectares
- Pier: 435 meters
- Platform: 25 meters
- Depth: minimum 10 feet, 365 days a year
- Facilities: 6 hectares of beaches and paved roads
- Covered warehouse: 0.3 hectares (100 X 30 meters)
- Free zone: Bolivian governed, for merchandise in transit

== Climate ==
The temperature in summer sometimes reaches 40 °C or higher. The minimum in winter is 0 °C. The average for the entire Central Department is 22 °C. The city is located in one of Paraguay's departments with the most rainfall during the months from January to April; and the least during the months from June to August.

== Demographics ==
The total population of the city is 36,228 inhabitants, 18,362 males and 17,866 females, according to the data from the General Directorate of Statistics, Polls and Census.

== History ==
Villeta was founded in 1714 by the Governor Juan Gregorio Bazán de Pedraza. During the government of Dr. Francia, the city became an important conduit for communication with other countries, making the economic development of the district possible.

== Economy ==
Until 1930 the city was famous because of activity at the port, mostly the export of oranges. Today the port is used for multiple purposes.

Villeta's port on the banks of the Paraguay River is the shipping point for most of Paraguay's exports. Nineteen large factories located in the area produce cement, iron rods, cotton, electric cables, and agricultural chemicals, and other activities. The cement and chemical plants are infamous for the environmental contamination they cause.

The major processing plant for Paraguay's cement industry is located in Villeta.

== Tourism ==
Located in the Gran Asunción Area, there are several historic buildings in the city of Villeta. The Church of the Virgin of the Rosary (Virgen del Rosario), built during the period of the Paraguayan War also served as a Hospital, and is one such edifice. The architecture of the church is an example of the distinctive characteristics of 19th-century art in Paraguay, especially in the murals painted by Adán Kunos.

Fishing can be enjoyed in Guyrati, Angostura and Itaipiru, near Argentina.

== Notable people ==
Famous residents of Villeta include:

- Rubén Bareiro Saguier
- Susy Delgado
- Isabel Arrúa Vallejos
- Josef Mengele (His house can be seen at "Mengele kue" just a few kilometres from the town on the main road.)

== How to get to Villeta ==
Through the Southern Access Route. (Part of the Route 1). Villeta is 34 kilometers south of Asunción. The Villeta–Alberdi–Pilar Route also connects the city to the south of the country.

== Gallery ==
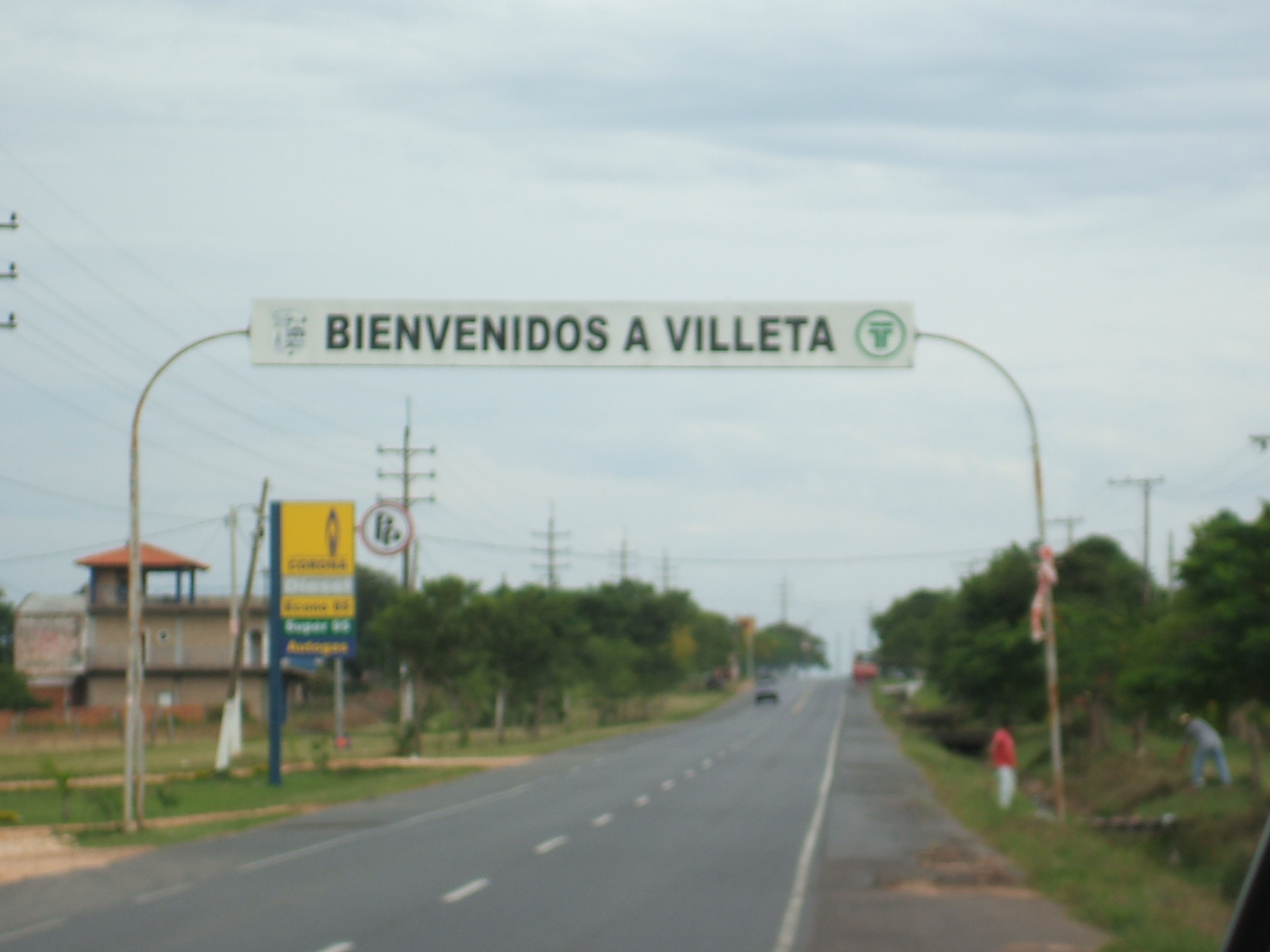
The entrance to the city of Villeta, Paraguay

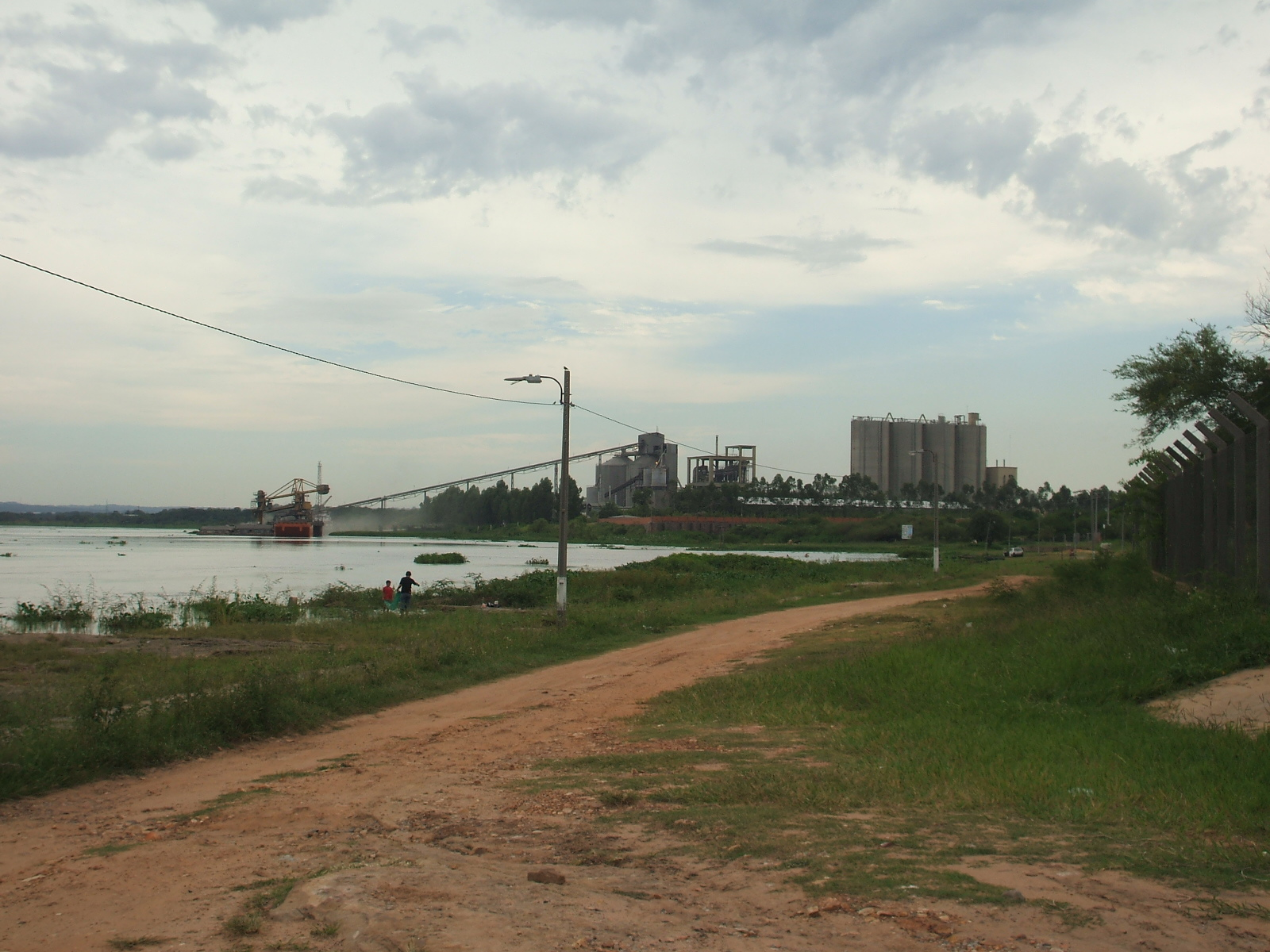
INC

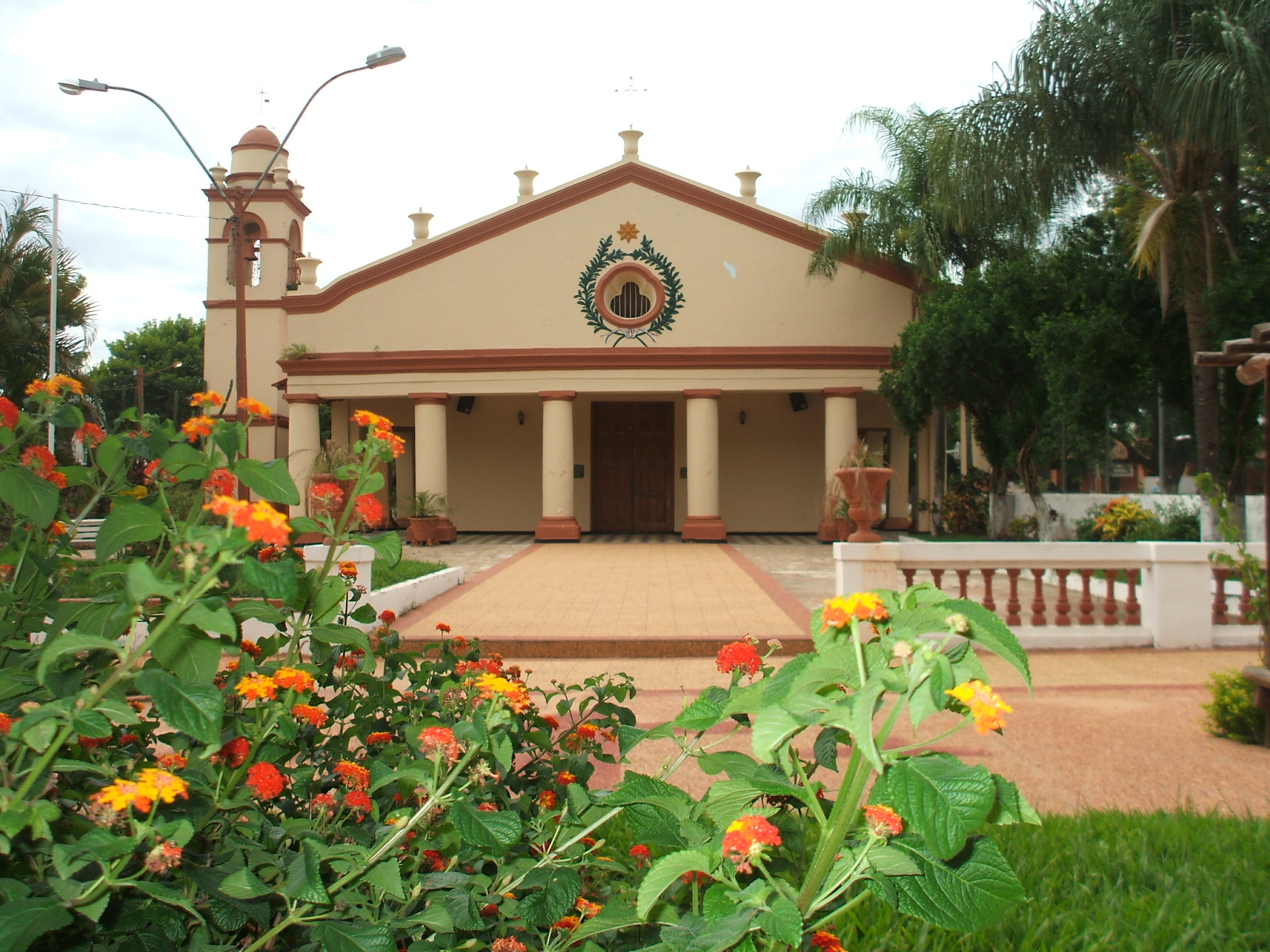
Church of Villeta

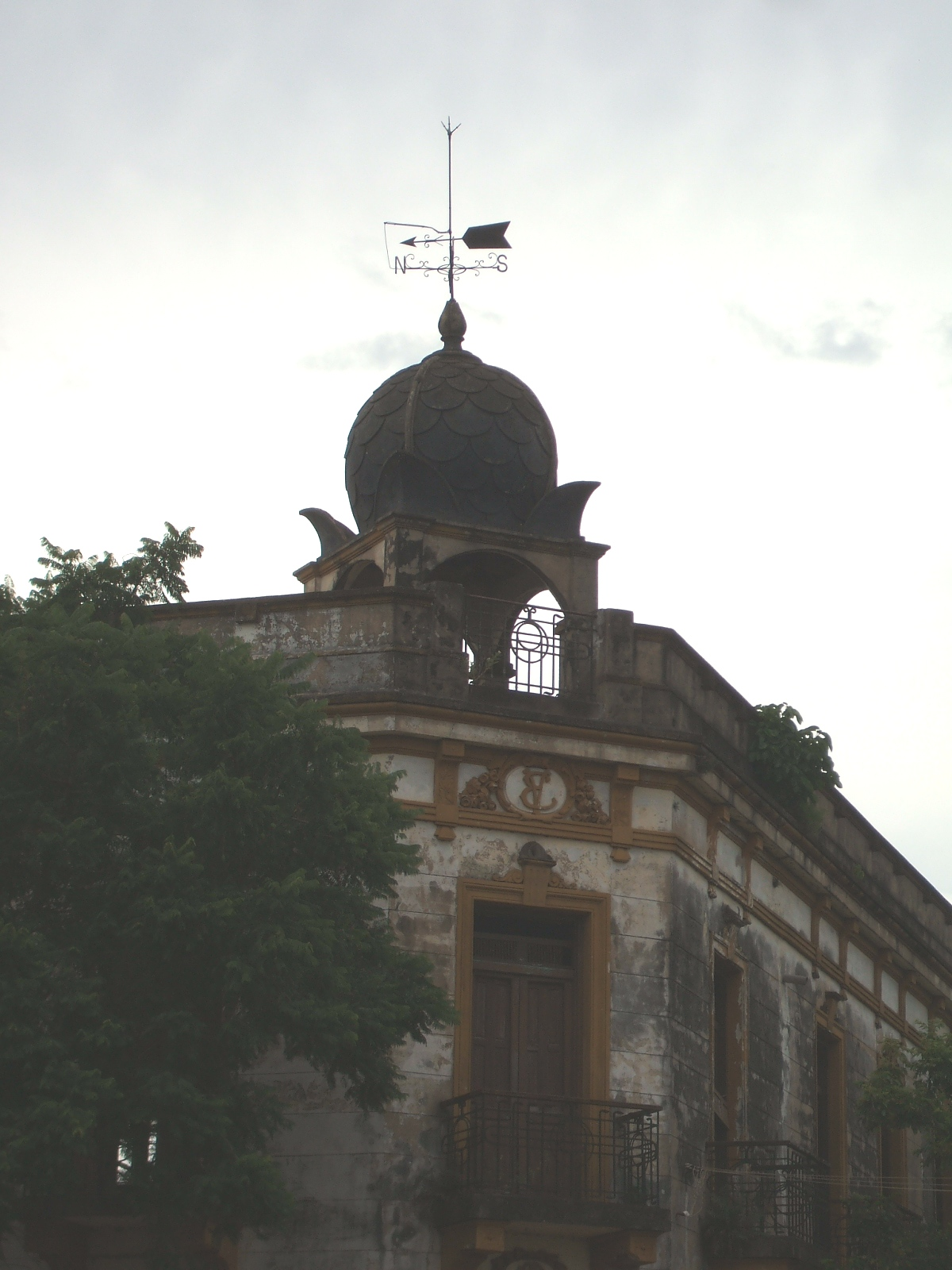
Historic building of Villeta 1921 known locally as the haunted house

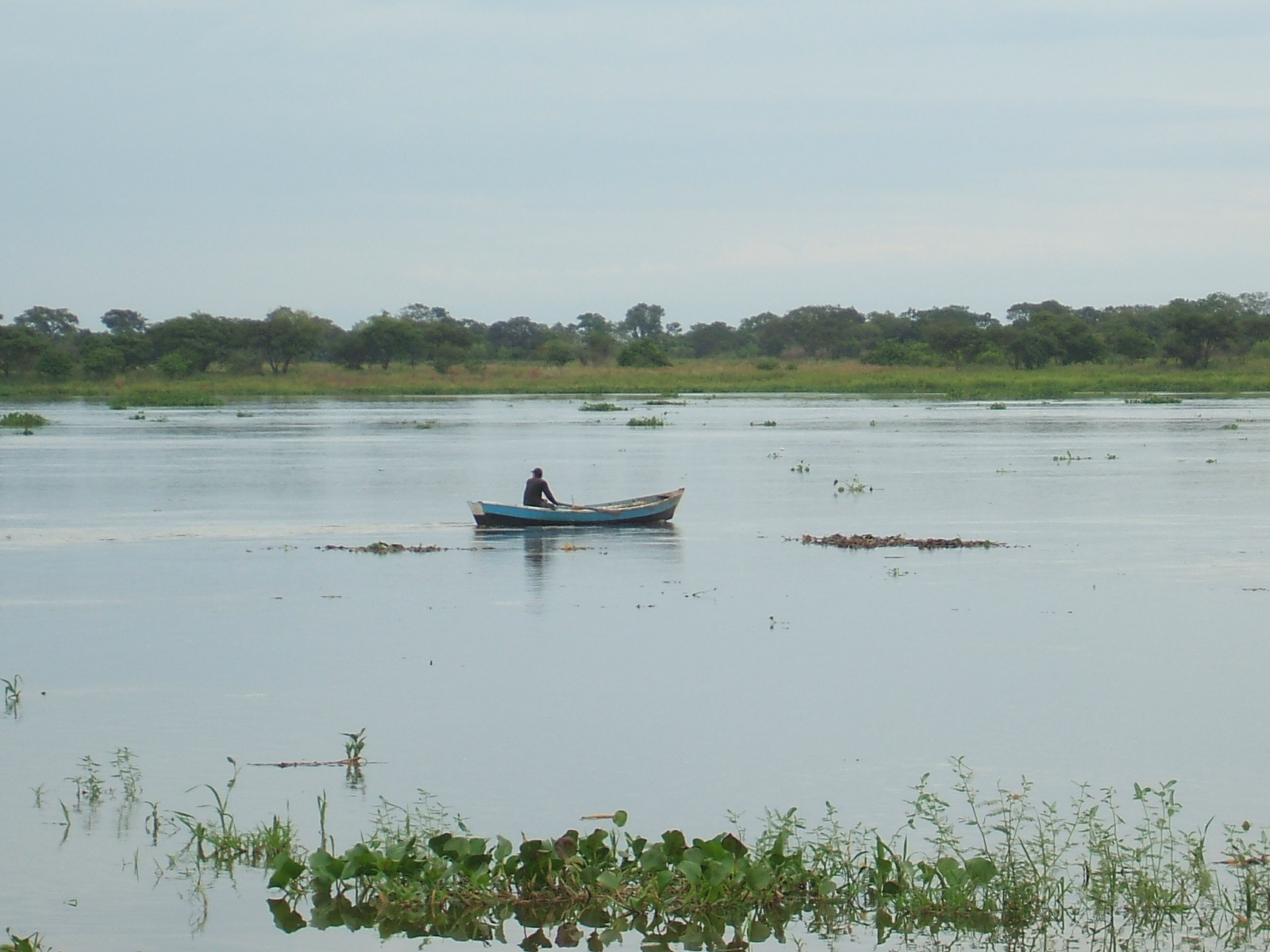
Canoe in the Paraguay river, in Villeta

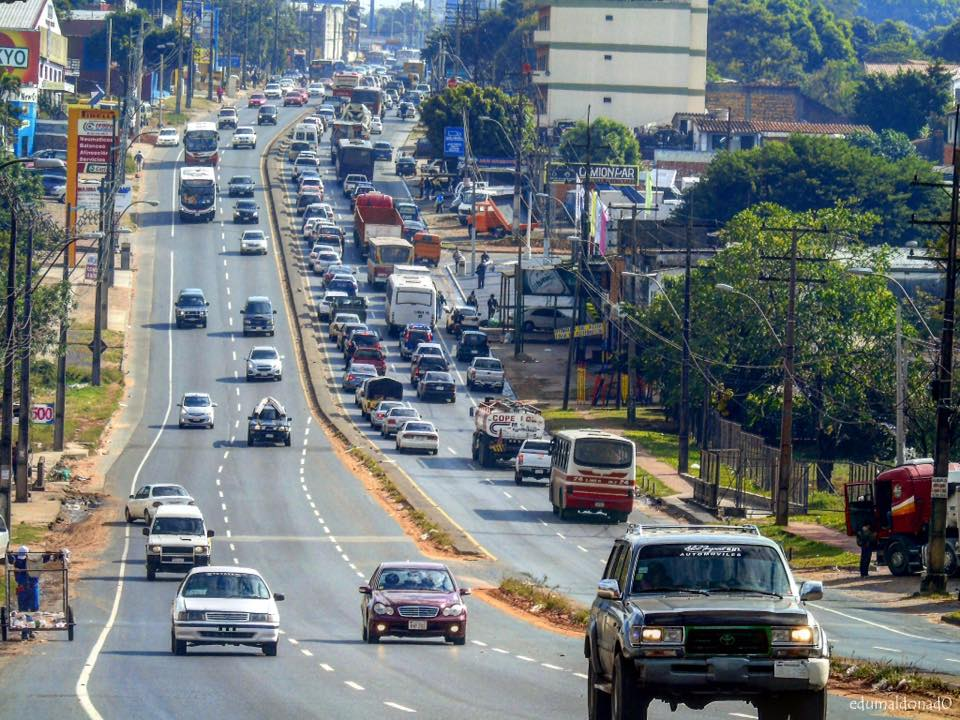
Southern Access Route, near Villeta, Paraguay.
