= Strawberry Expo =

Food festival in Paraguay

Strawberry Expo Expo Frutilla
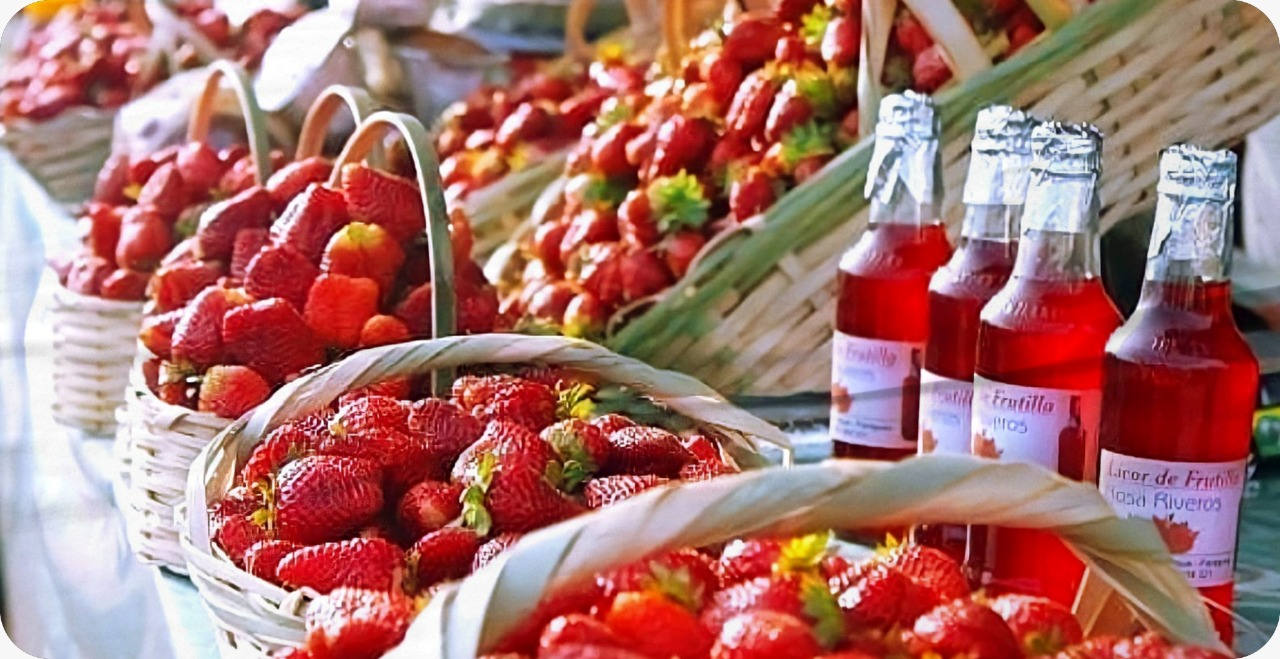
- Strawberry products in display
- Type: Cultural, national
- Begins: Early to mid-July
- Ends: Late September to early October
- Date: Strawberry harvest season
- Duration: 2 months
- Frequency: Annual
- First time: 2000; 26 years ago

Strawberry Expo (Spanish: Expo Frutilla) is the name given in Paraguay to any exhibition of strawberries and strawberry-derived products by farmers and producers. The biggest and most famous one is the annual two-month-long festival in the district of Areguá, where this trend started.

== Origin ==
Strawberries were introduced in the 1930s in the zone between Areguá and the town of Estanzuela in Itauguá.

One theory suggests that Russian immigrants in Areguá introduced strawberries and that its first farmers were headed by Emil Litvinenko and Alexander Yakovlev. Italian immigrants also participated, the most notable case being Pedro Comelli who prepared homemade strawberry jams.

Another theory states that the farming of strawberries in Paraguay started in Estanzuela with Manuel Quintana, an Argentinian immigrant of Spanish descent. Estanzuela is now known as the "Home of Strawberries" and 95% of its populaltion make a living out of strawberry farming.

As of 2015, 65 hectares of land between Areguá and Estanzuela are used as strawberry plantations and 500 families exhibit their products at the Strawberry Expo.

== Products ==
There is a great variety of products offered at the Areguá Expo. As of 2023, these include: normal and diet jams, liquors, cakes, juice, smoothies with and without milk, cocktails, mousse, pastafrolas, strawberries and whipped cream, piononos, bonbons, strawberry ice cream with manioc, empanadas, alfajores, fruit cups, strawberries on a stick bathed in chocolate, puddings and strawberry pulp in syrup.

== Traditions ==
Each year's festival has its own name. The event is usually organized by producers' committees with support from the municipal government and attended by the mayor and members of the council. Attending the event is free of charge. There are performances of traditional music by local groups and artists during the festival, especially on weekends.

Parents take their children to strawberry farms to collect the fruits themselves in an event which some have named frutikids. The parents stay for lunch where the farms offer them traditional Paraguayan foods. The visitors also take the opportunity to visit the traditional artisans' markets and tourist attractions.

== In other cities ==
Strawberry expos sometimes take place in other cities. Sometimes these are hosted by local producers and sometimes by producers from Areguá who take their products to another city.

Smaller-scale expos in cities other than Areguá have been recorded in Asunción, Yaguarón, Ciudad del Este and San Pedro.
