= Isabel Arrúa Vallejos =

Paraguayan teacher, diplomat and feminist

Isabel Arrúa Vallejo or Vallejos (1913/1914-2006) was a Paraguayan teacher, diplomat and feminist. She was Paraguay's first woman with diplomatic rank, as attaché of the Embassy of Paraguay to Brazil from 1945 to 1948.

== Life ==
Isabel Arrua Vallejos was born in Villeta. (Some sources give her year of birth as 1913, and others give it as 1914.) She became a teacher, and also worked as a nurse on the front line in the 1932-35 Chaco War.

In 1942 she entered the Ministry of Foreign Affairs. She also worked at the Embassy of Paraguay in Washington, D.C., from 1949 to 1950.

An associate of Federico Chávez, Vallejo was a founder-member of the Paraguayan League for Women's Rights, established in 1951, and edited the League's newspaper, El Feminista. She was a national deputy and delegate to the Inter-American Commission of Women.

She died in Asunción in 2006. In 2012 her life was celebrated in the Paseo de Ilustres, a public space in Villeta dedicated to the memory of ten people from the city.
