= San Bernardino, Paraguay =

San Bernardino
- Town and District
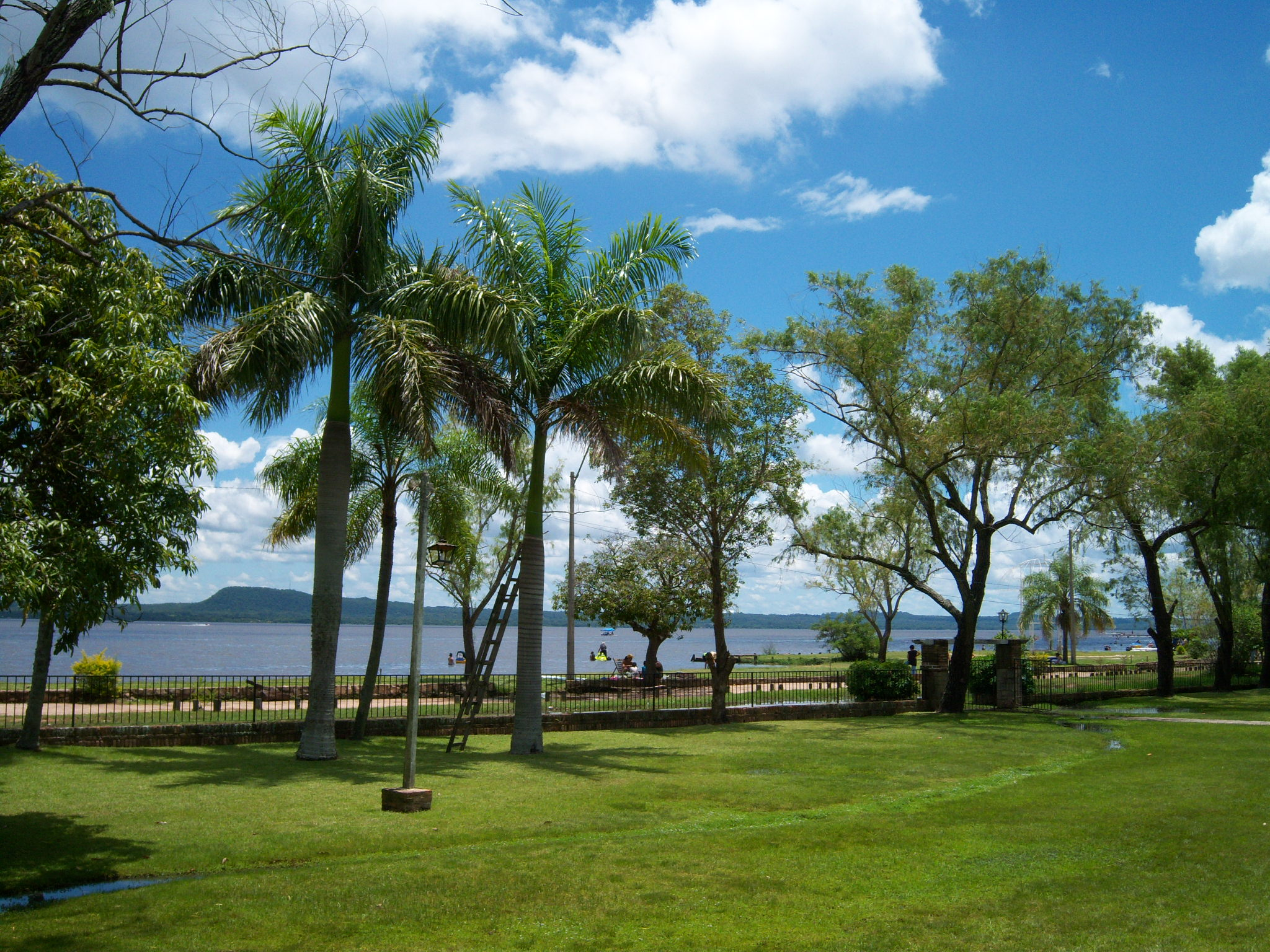
- On the shores of Ypacarai Lake, in San Bernardino, Paraguay

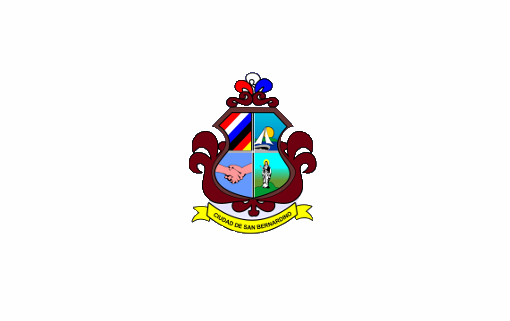
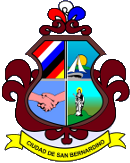
- Flag Coat of arms

- Location within Paraguay
- Coordinates: 25°18′38″S 57°17′46″W
- Country: Paraguay
- Department: Cordillera
- Founded: August 24, 1881

Government
  - Intendant: Ramón Zubizarreta
- Elevation: 80 m (260 ft)

Population (2012)
  - Total: 20,491
- Area code: +595 (512)

San Bernardino (colloquially known as San Ber) is a town in Paraguay, located on the shores of Ypacarai Lake in the Cordillera Department. It is a popular holiday resort for people from Greater Asunción.

== History ==
The town was founded in 1881 by German and Swiss immigrants, among them Santiago Schaerer, founder and first colony manager, and was renamed after Saint Bernard to honor Bernardino Caballero, president of Paraguay between 1880 and 1886.

In the last decades of the nineteenth century was built the Hotel del Lago, where the German anti-Semitic activist Bernhard Förster spent the last six weeks of his life, before committing suicide on June 3, 1889 by taking an overdose of strychnine. Inspired by a letter from Richard Wagner and his own anti-Semitism, he traveled to Paraguay to create a model German settlement with his wife Elisabeth Förster-Nietzsche (sister of the philosopher Friedrich Nietzsche) and several German families. Their efforts, at the site called Nueva Germania, were not successful, leading him to go to San Bernardino.

== Tourism ==
Having one of the highest per capita income in the country, San Bernardino is the summer home site of traditional families from Greater Asunción. The peak tourist season in San Bernardino is from December to mid February, which is the summer season in the country. During this time young people from Asunción and neighbouring cities and towns meet around the main meeting points, which are clubs and pubs at night and public spaces in the morning. There are breweries and places that sell traditional German food and drinks.

The town contains a museum.

== Demography ==
According to the Statistics, Surveys and Censuses Bureau of Paraguay, In 2012 San Bernardino has a total of 20,491 inhabitants. Due to its colonization, the German and Spanish influences are visible and the city is predominantly white, where 85% are made up of whites of Italian, Spanish, German and Swiss descent, and roughly 15% are made up of mixed race (mestizo).

== Gallery ==
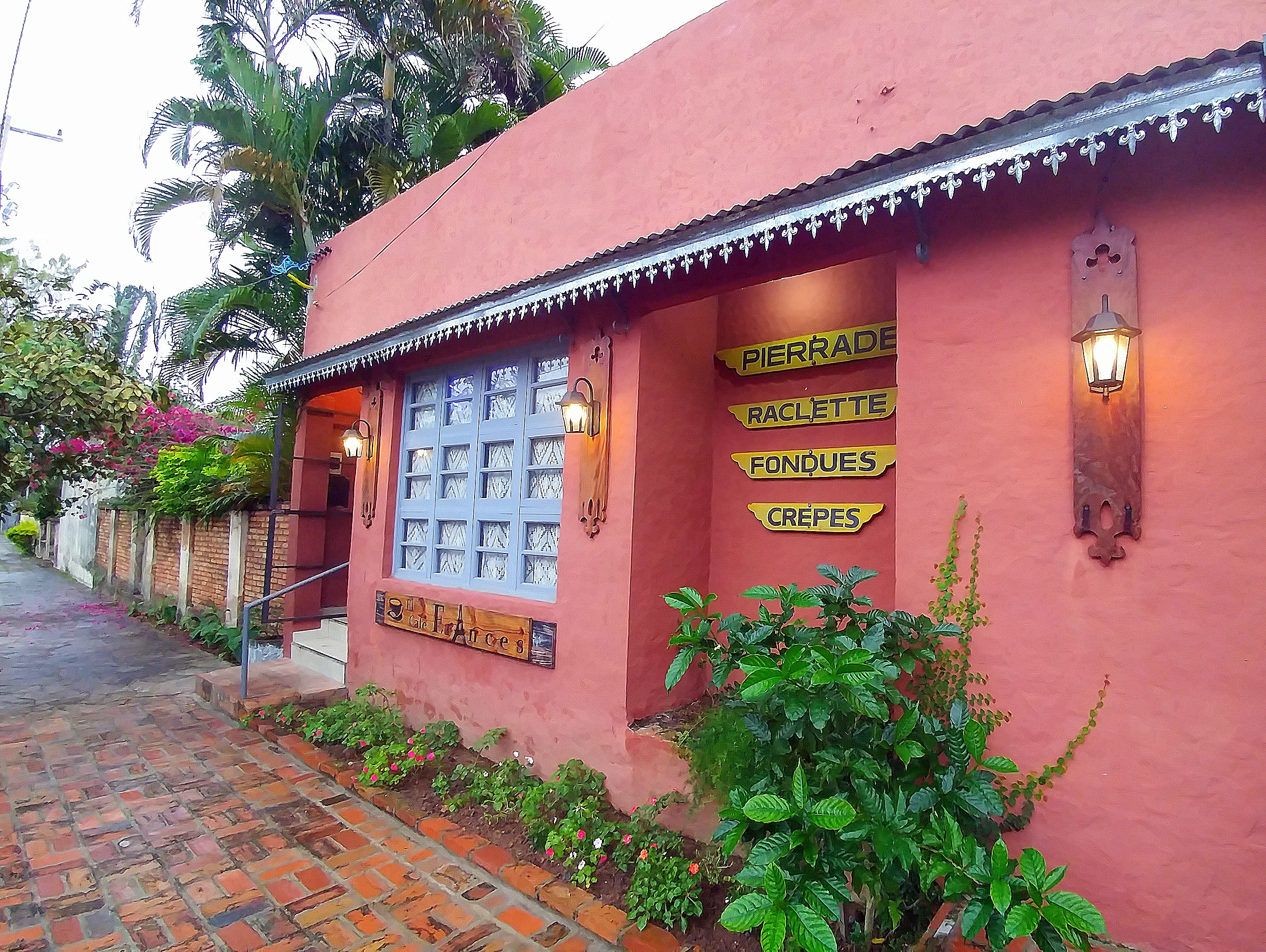
Restaurants in San Bernardino.

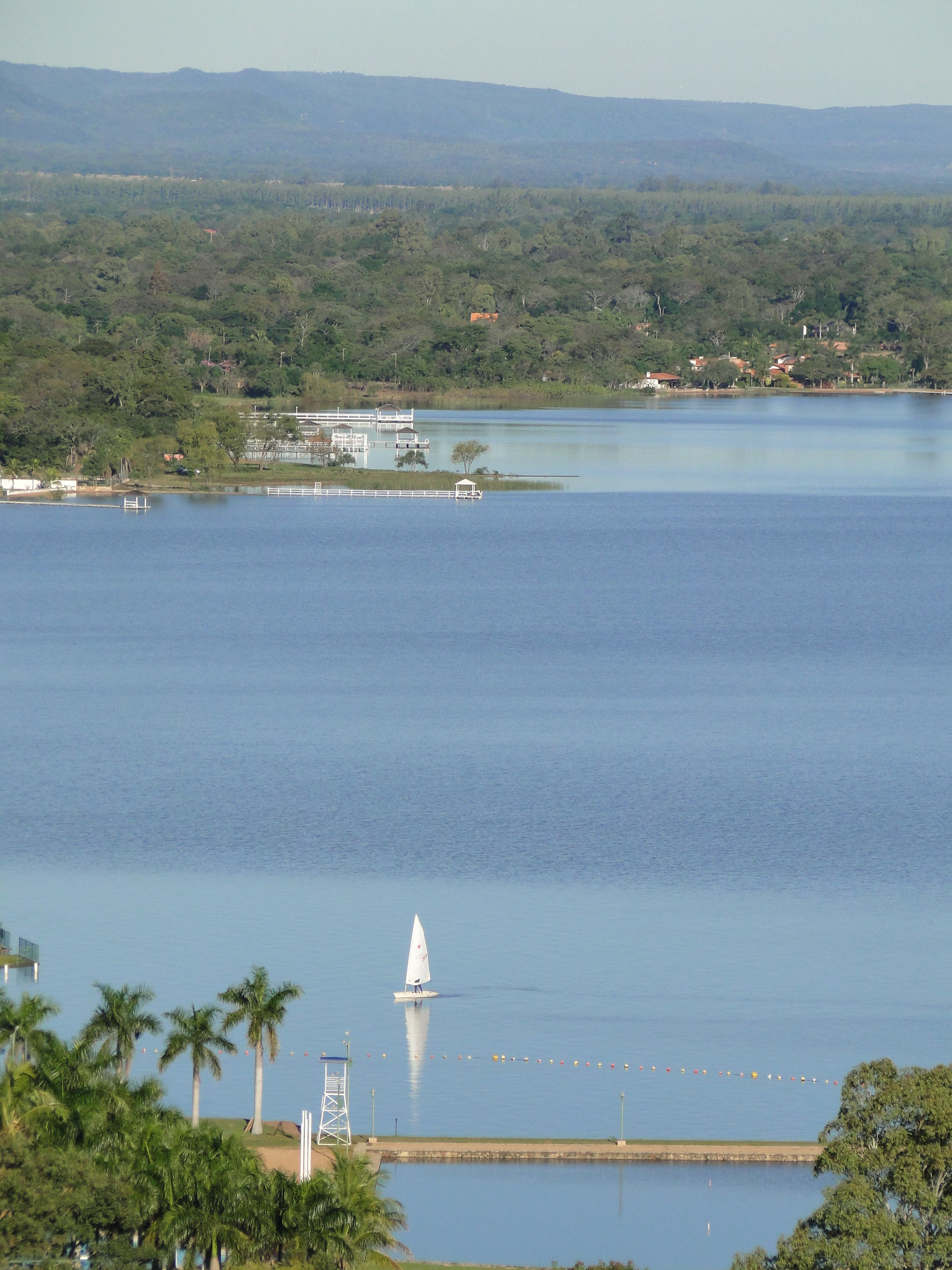
San Bernardino, Paraguay.

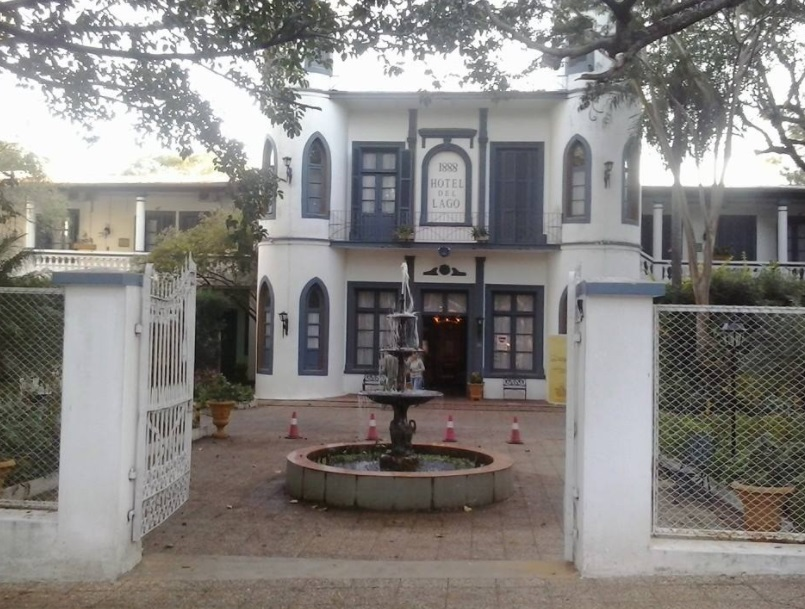
One of the hotels in San Bernardino, Cordillera, Paraguay.

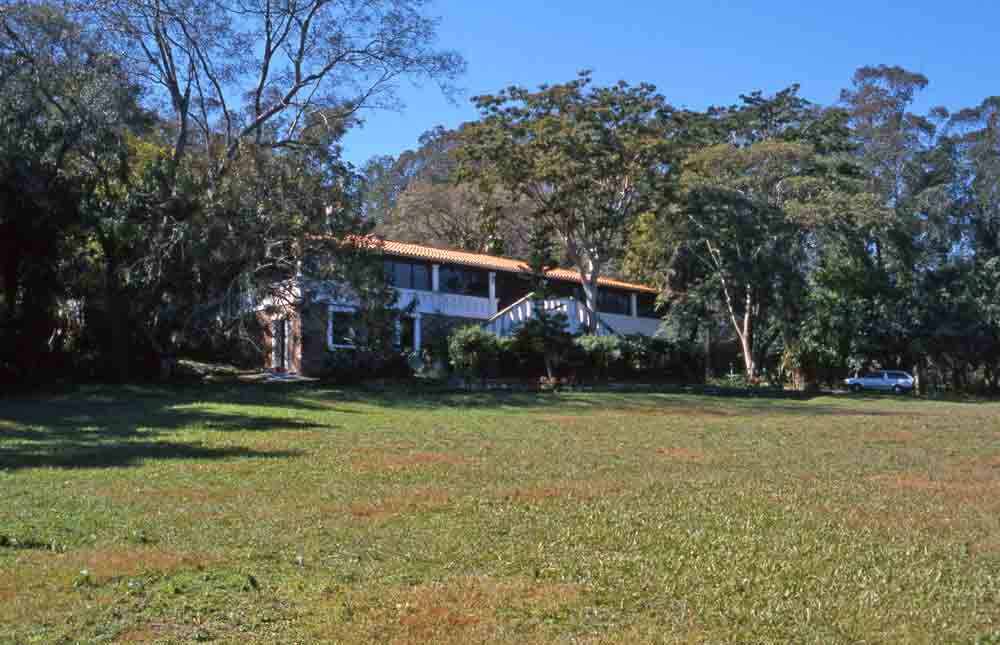
A house built by Emil Hassler in 1898, in a place known as Bierschlucht in San Bernardino.

== Sister cities ==
- Villa Carlos Paz, Argentina
- Tarija, Bolivia
