= Julián Augusto Saldívar =

- City
- Location within Paraguay
- Coordinates: 25.45°S 57.4°W
- Country: Paraguay
- Department: Central department

Population (2007)
  - Total: 5,383

Julián Augusto Saldívar (also known as Posta Leiva) is a city located along the 23rd to 28th kilometer of Ruta 1 (Paraguay) in the Central department of Paraguay. The city is well known for its exports of tangerines, lettuce and other agricultural products. The city has grown considerably in the past 15 years. From a population of about 2,013 in 1992, it has more than doubled in population to around 5,383 in 2007, according to a recent census. The city is approximately 20 km due east from the town of Ypané which borders the Paraguay River. Its most notable location is on the 27th kilometer where the road breaks off at a fork called Tres Bocas. At this fork, travelers can gain access to the southern region of Paraguay.

The dominant religion in the area is Catholic, like the rest of the country, although many missionaries for the Church of Jesus Christ of Latter-day Saints have established a strong following among many of the inhabitants of the area.

The alternate name of the city, Posta Leiva, derives from Don Leiva, who was among the first people to inhabit the area of Julián Augusto Saldívar. Don Leiva set up a trading post to invite travelers to come and buy from his market and was quick to help strengthening others that were less fortunate than he was. Upon his death in the mid 1980s, his family and the people of his community tried to rename the city of Julián Augusto Saldívar back to Posta Leiva in remembrance of him and his great compassion toward his family and the people he worked with every day in the region.
