= Areguá =

Areguá Aregua
- District
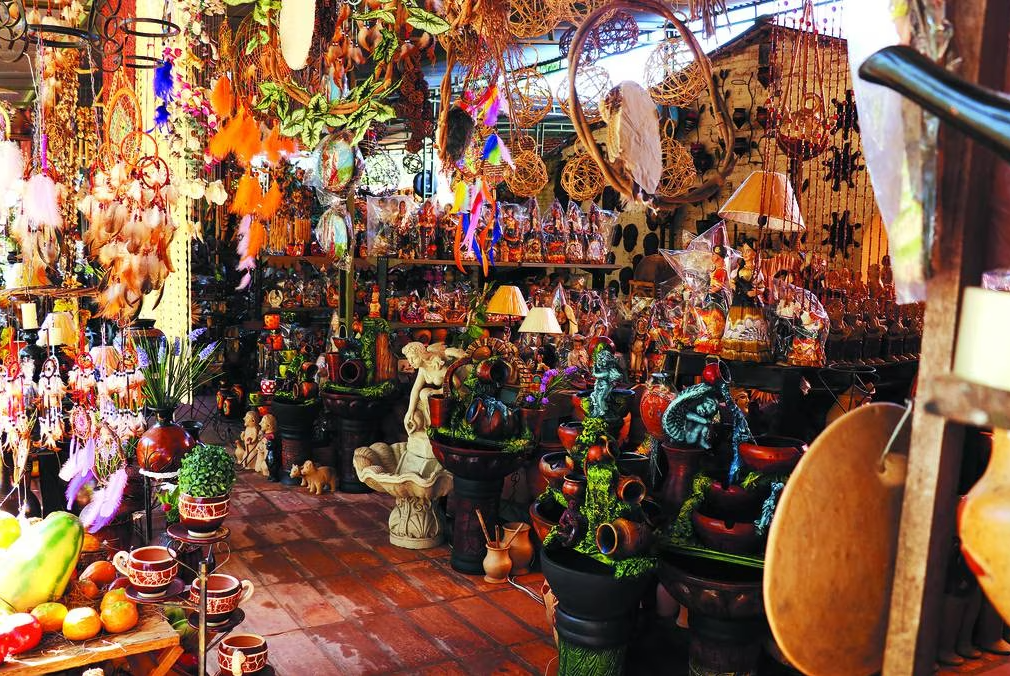
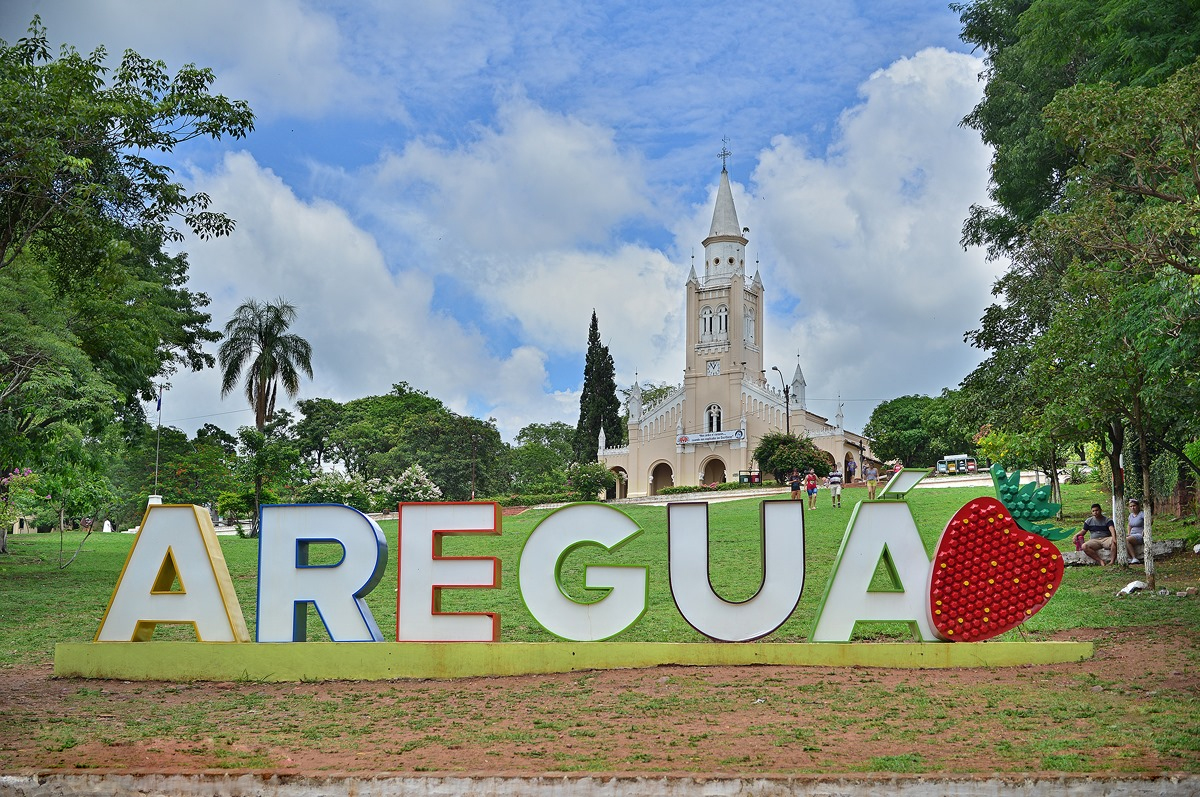
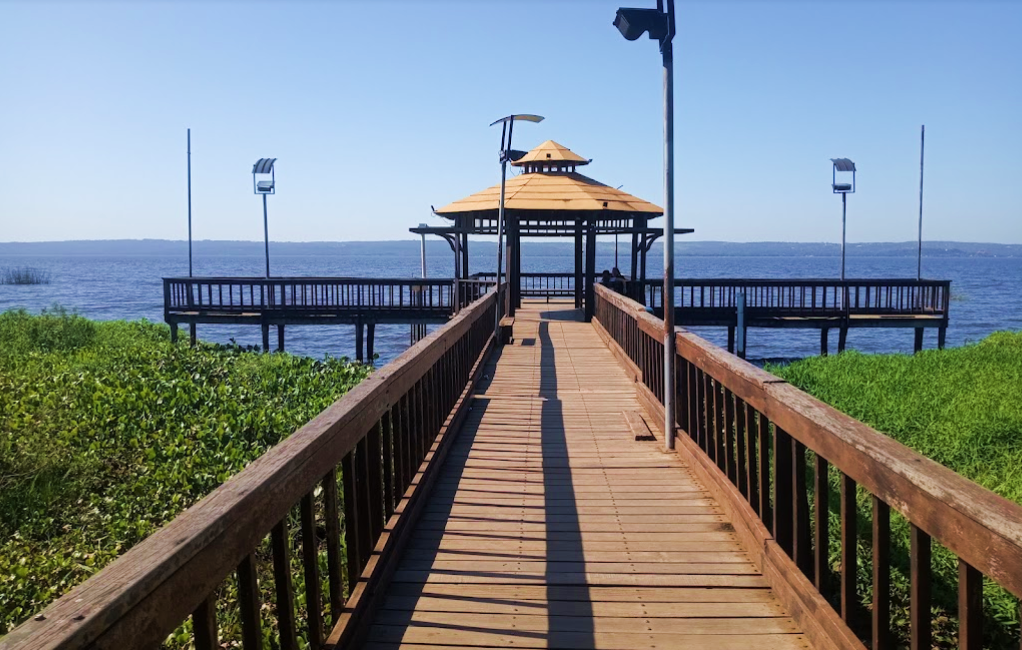
- Top: an artisans' market Bottom (left to right): the welcome sign in front of the main church and a view from Areguá Beach.

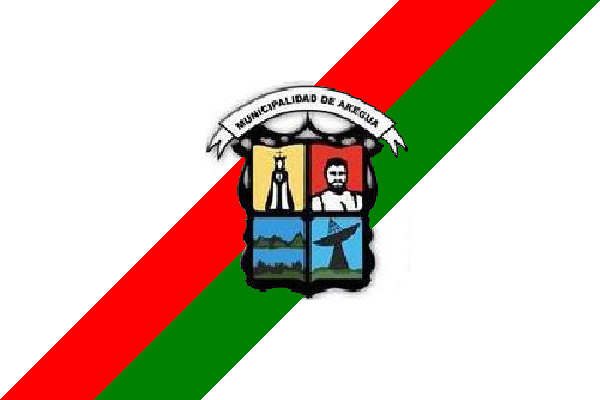
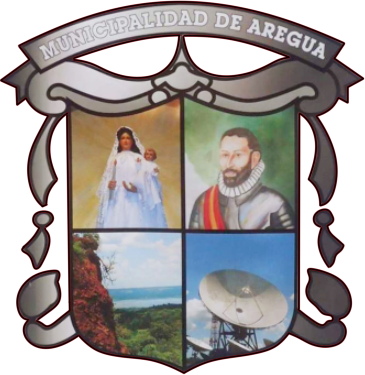
- Flag Coat of arms
- Etymology: People from above
- Nickname(s): City of Strawberries
- Location within Paraguay
- Country: Paraguay
- Department: Central

Government
  - Mayor: Humberto Denis Torres Fleytas (ANR)

Area
  - Total: 105 km^{2} (41 sq mi)
- Elevation: 70 m (230 ft)

Population
  - 2023 estimate: 83,028
  - Density: 642.73/km^{2} (1,664.7/sq mi)
- Time zone: UTC-3
- Calling code: 291
- Website: https://www.municipios.gov.py/aregua/

Areguá (Guarani: Aregua) is a creative city and the capital of Central Department in Paraguay. It is known for its production of strawberry products, pottery, colonial architecture and historic cobblestone streets.

The district lies between the Ypacaraí Lake and the basin it forms with the Salado River to the East and hills to the West.

== Etymology ==
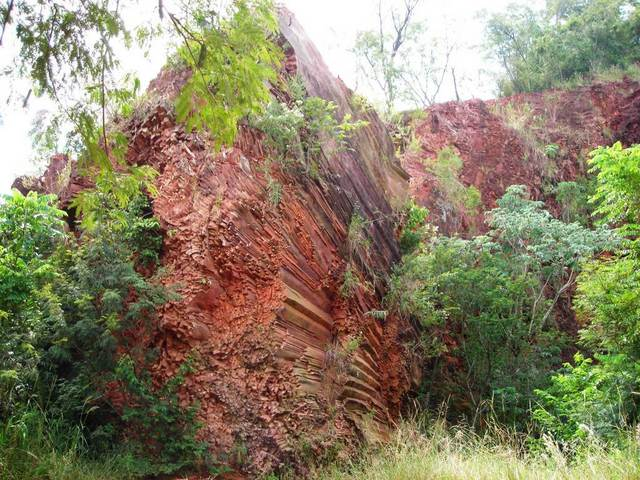
Koi Hill

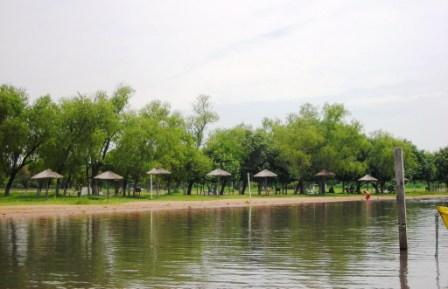
Areguá Beach

Areguá is thought to come from Classical Guarani ariguâ·r ("[person/people] from above, from up there"), refererring to the area's high altitude and its first inhabitants from the Mbya Guarani tribes.

== History ==
Areguá was founded by Domingo Martínez de Irala in 1538. Early settlers, numbering about 200, lived close to the church. They were Mercedarians who arrived with the Spanish to raise cattle. African slaves were put to work on these farms.

It was promoted to district status on November 12, 1862 by Francisco Solano López.

By the end of the 19th century, Areguá had become a tourist destination to which many writers, artists and intellectuals from nearby areas retreated in the summer.

In 2019, it was designed as a city of crafts and folk arts by the UNESCO as part of its Creative Cities Network.

== Geography ==
Areguá is divided in twenty-four barrios:

1	San Miguel	13	Costa Fleitas
2	Santo Domingo	14	Jukyty
3	San Roque	15	Valle Pucú
4	Las Mercedes	16	Jukyry
5	Boquerón	17	Isla Valle
6	San Cayetano	18	San Miguel
7	Santa Catalina	19	Caacupemí
8	Estanzuela	20	Fracción Yvoty
9	Kokue Guasu	21	Fracción Alicia
10	Pindolo	22	Villa Salvador
11	San Antonio	23	Villa Rosita
12	María Auxiliadora	24	Tajy Poty

=== Climate ===
Areguá's climate is temperate. Maximum summer temperatures reach 40°C. Average winter temperatures are 0°C. The average annual rainfall is 1377mm distributed throughout the year.

== Demography ==
Areguá's population is about 67,847. Of these residents, 33,870 are female and 33,977 are male.

== Culture ==
Areguá's economy is based on strawberry farming. The town is also known for its pottery, which is an emergent industry in the region.

Every year, the Strawberry Expo takes place in Areguá. It consists of a month-long strawberry festival where farmers and producers sell strawberries and strawberry products (from juice, cakes and liquors to ice cream, empanadas and pastafrolas).

The district's patronal festival is February 2 (Virgin of Candelaria). Celebrations last around ten days, these include: a novena, a folk festival, serenatas and a procession that takes the image of the Virgin of Candelaria to schools, businesses and chapels, among other places.

== Places of interest ==
Areguá has a historic area centred on Avenida del Lago (Lake Avenue) which runs from a hilltop church to the Ypacaraí Lake. In 1997, the Paraguayan parliament declared it a National Heritage Area.

Isla Valle, the local ecological organization, regulates fishing in the lake.

Another attraction is the Centro Artesanal de la Cuenca. At the Center, craftsmen from the region display locally made pottery and crafts. Aregua also has art galleries, including Guggiari Arte, Luis Cogliolo Galería de Arte, Paseo La Candelaria, Areguá pesebres, El Cántaro, and Museo las Margaritas.

The Koi and Chorori hills are a geologic attraction. Koi Hill is known for its formations of hexagonal sandstone. The formations are a protected heritage site and the hill was declared a Natural Monument in 1993.

== Notable people ==
The Paraguayan writer Gabriel Casaccia was born in Areguá.
