= Demetrio Ortiz =

Paraguayan musician

Demetrio Ortiz (Piribebuy, 22 December 1916 – Buenos Aires, 18 August 1975) was a Paraguayan musician.
