= Salado River (Paraguay) =

Coordinates: 25°6′26″S 57°28′38″W

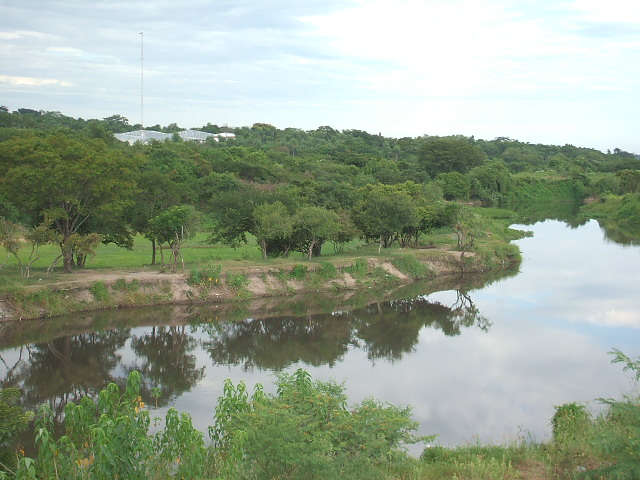

Location
- Country: Paraguay

Physical characteristics
- Source
  - location: Ypacaraí Lake
- Mouth
  - location: Paraguay River

The Salado River (Spanish, Río Salado) is a river of Paraguay. It is a tributary of the Paraguay River.

== See also ==
- List of rivers of Paraguay
