= Gran Asunción =

Coordinates: 25°16′55″S 57°38′06″W

- Greater Asunción
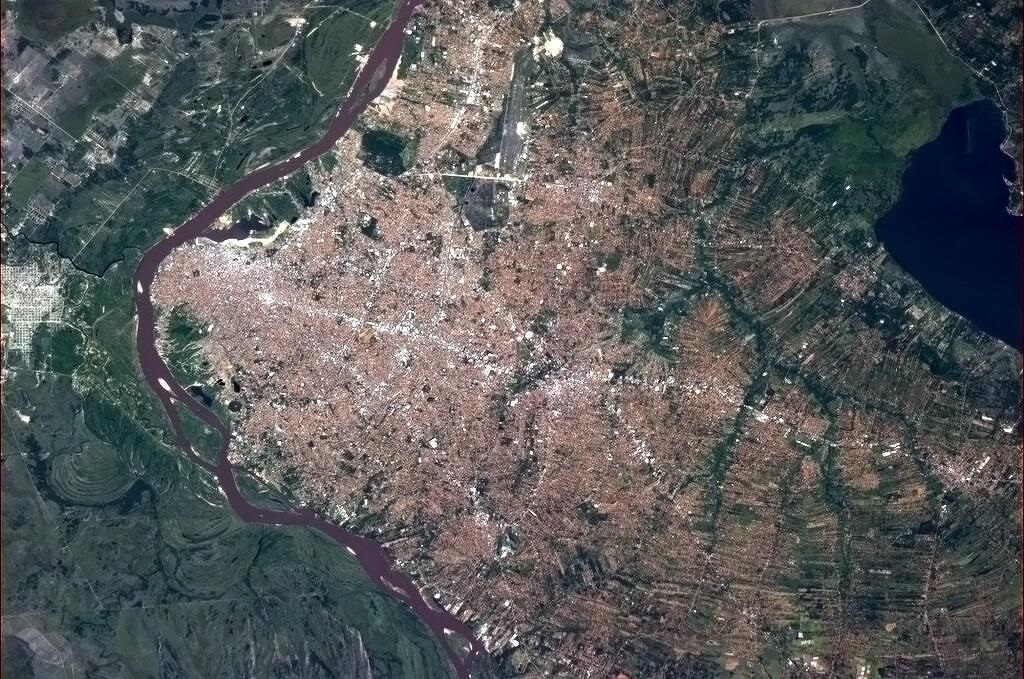
- Interactive map of Gran Asunción
- Country: Paraguay
- Major Cities: Asunción; San Lorenzo; Luque; Capiatá; Lambaré; Fernando de la Mora

Area
  - Metro: 2,582 km^{2} (997 sq mi)

Population (2020)
  - Metro: 2,722,668
  - Metro density: 1,054/km^{2} (2,730/sq mi)

Gran Asunción (lit. 'Greater Asunción') is the metropolitan area of Asunción, the capital city of Paraguay. It consists of twenty cities: Asunción itself and the surrounding cities in Central Department. One in three Paraguayans live in this metropolitan area, which has more than 2.7 million inhabitants.

== List of cities in Great Asunción ==
N°	City	Department	Area	Population	Asunción (dark blue) and the metropolitan rings in Central Department.
1	Asunción	Distrito Capital	117	521 559	Asunción (dark blue) and the metropolitan rings in Central Department.
2	Luque	Central	152	281 719	Asunción (dark blue) and the metropolitan rings in Central Department.
3	San Lorenzo	Central	56	258 919	Asunción (dark blue) and the metropolitan rings in Central Department.
4	Capiatá	Central	88	240 950	Asunción (dark blue) and the metropolitan rings in Central Department.
5	Lambaré	Central	27	182 689	Asunción (dark blue) and the metropolitan rings in Central Department.
6	Fernando de la Mora	Central	20	180 186	Asunción (dark blue) and the metropolitan rings in Central Department.
7	Limpio	Central	110	150 566	Asunción (dark blue) and the metropolitan rings in Central Department.
8	Ñemby	Central	29	144 106	Asunción (dark blue) and the metropolitan rings in Central Department.
9	Itauguá	Central	126	112 162	Asunción (dark blue) and the metropolitan rings in Central Department.
10	Mariano Roque Alonso	Central	40	105 789	Asunción (dark blue) and the metropolitan rings in Central Department.
11	Itá	Central	182	82 032	Asunción (dark blue) and the metropolitan rings in Central Department.
12	Villa Elisa	Central	18	81 223	Asunción (dark blue) and the metropolitan rings in Central Department.
13	Areguá	Central	114	77 652	Asunción (dark blue) and the metropolitan rings in Central Department.
14	San Antonio	Central	23	69 976	Asunción (dark blue) and the metropolitan rings in Central Department.
15	Ypané	Central	53	56 793	Asunción (dark blue) and the metropolitan rings in Central Department.
16	Saldívar	Central	32	55 055	Asunción (dark blue) and the metropolitan rings in Central Department.
17	Villeta	Central	868	41 235	Asunción (dark blue) and the metropolitan rings in Central Department.
18	Guarambaré	Central	30	39 084	Asunción (dark blue) and the metropolitan rings in Central Department.
19	Ypacaraí	Central	111	28 283	Asunción (dark blue) and the metropolitan rings in Central Department.
20	Nueva Italia	Central	386	12 690	Asunción (dark blue) and the metropolitan rings in Central Department.
	Total		2582	2 722 668	Asunción (dark blue) and the metropolitan rings in Central Department.

== Transportation ==
The Silvio Pettirossi International Airport in Luque connects this metropolitan area with other American and European destinations.
