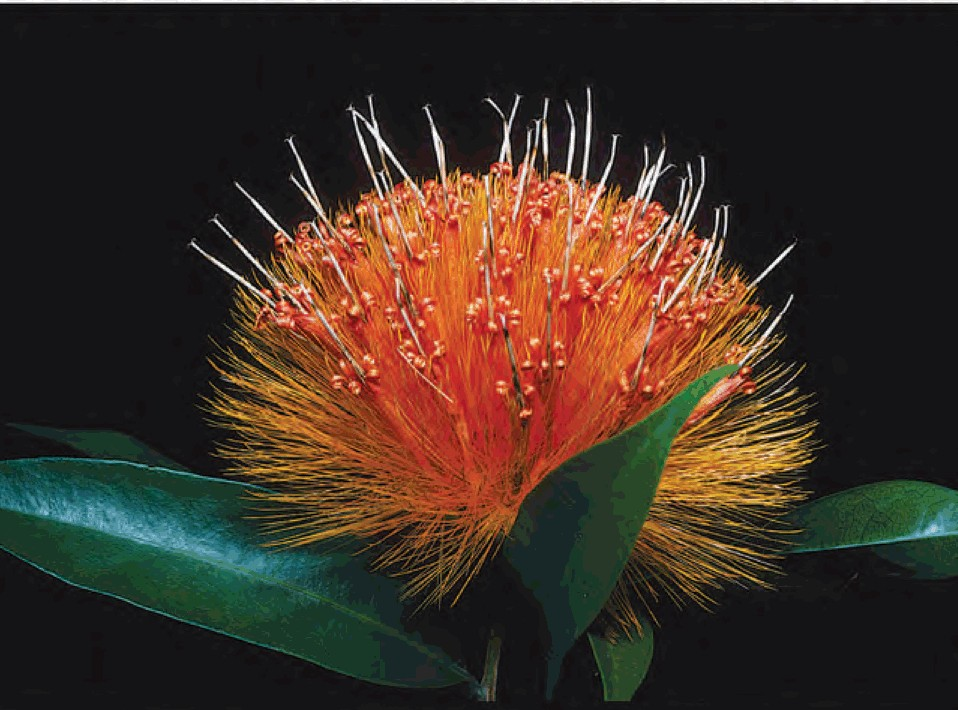
- Stifftia chrysantha

Scientific classification
- Kingdom: Plantae
- Clade: Tracheophytes
- Clade: Angiosperms
- Clade: Eudicots
- Clade: Asterids
- Order: Asterales
- Family: Asteraceae
- Subfamily: Stifftioideae; Panero
- Tribe: Stifftieae; D.Don

Genera
- Achnopogon Maguire, Steyermark & Wurdack; Dinoseris Griseb.; Duidaea S.F.Blake; Eurydochus Maguire & Wurdack; Glossarion Maguire; Gongylolepis R.H.Schomb.; Hyaloseris Griseb.; Neblinaea Maguire & Wurdack; Quelchia N.E.Br.; Salcedoa Jiménez Rodr. & Katinas; Stifftia J.C.Mikan

= Stifftioideae =

Subfamily of flowering plants

The Stifftioideae are a subfamily of the family Asteraceae family of flowering plants. It comprises a single tribe, Stifftieae, of ten genera.

These plants are vines, shrubs or small trees with thin to leathery, hairless of felty haired leaves with leaf stalks and entire margins, set alternately or rarely oppositely along the branches. The flower heads are at the tip of the branches or rarely in the axils of the leaves, on their own or in open to tightly packed cymes. The involucre may be narrowly cylindrical to half globular, and consists of at least three whorls of overlapping and gradually changing bracts. The common base of the florets (or receptacle) does not carry a bract (or palea) subtending each floret. The florets are all bisexual and may have either a ligulate corolla, a disk corolla, or a bilabiate corolla (three lobes merged to a strap with teeth at the tip and two lobes free much further down), and the lobes may be strongly coiled. The corolla can be yellow, orange, red, white, pink or purple. Like in all asterids, the anthers are fused into a tube, though which the style grows, picking up the pollen that is discarded at the inside of the tube. The anthers have spurs at their base and appendages at their tip. The styles have hairless shafts and mostly hairless branches (sometimes with papillae at the outside). The one-seeded indehiscent fruits (called cypselas) are cylindrical and carry a pappus of many white, straw-colored or bright orange or pink bristles (which may be feather-like).
