= D. salicifolia =

D. salicifolia may refer to:

- Dinoseris salicifolia, a plant species in the Asteraceae
- Dipholis salicifolia, a plant species in the Sapotaceae
- Duguetia salicifolia, a plant species in the Annonaceae

== See also ==
- Salicifolia (disambiguation)
