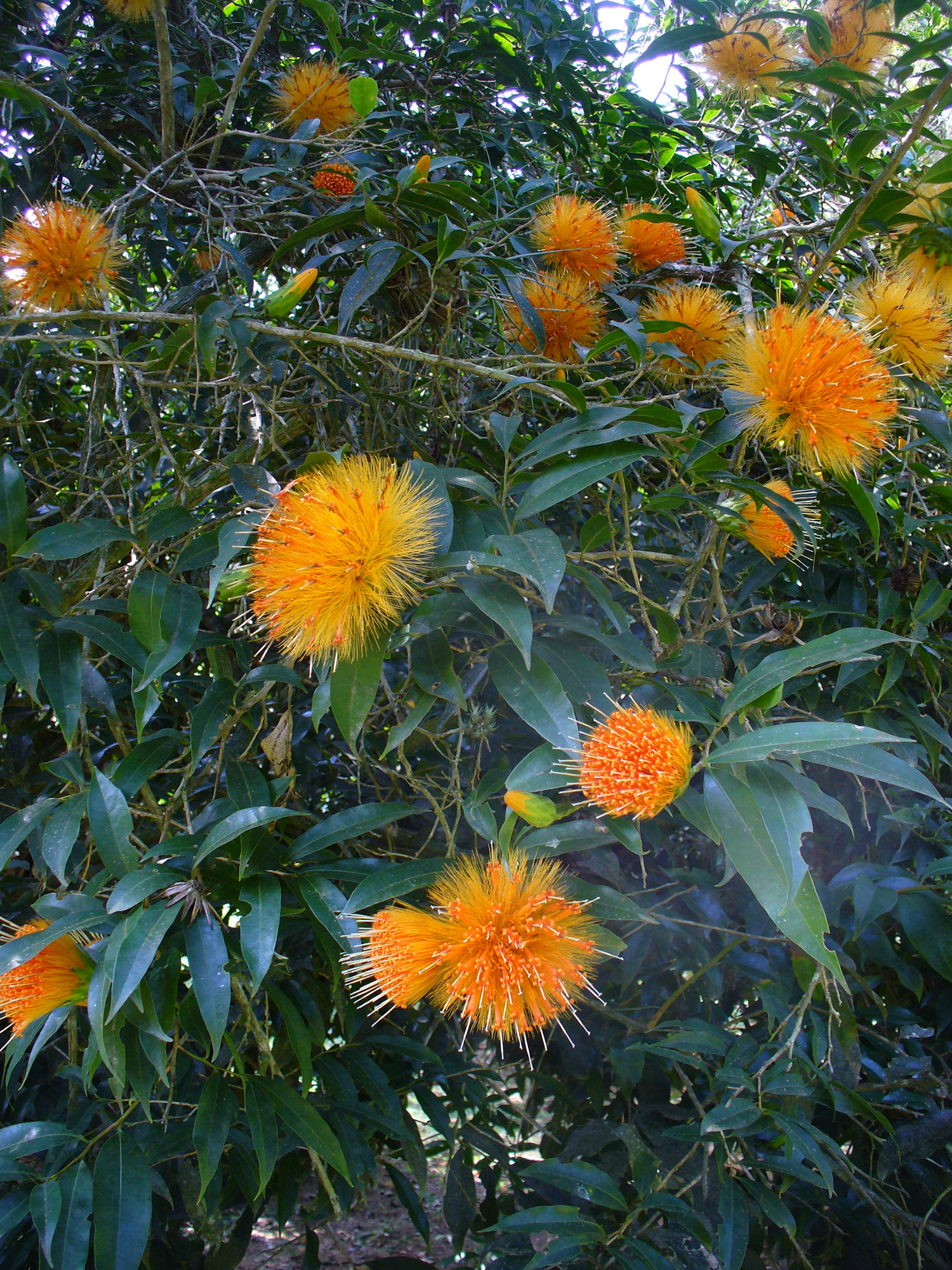
- Stifftia chrysantha

Scientific classification
- Kingdom: Plantae
- Clade: Tracheophytes
- Clade: Angiosperms
- Clade: Eudicots
- Clade: Asterids
- Order: Asterales
- Family: Asteraceae
- Subfamily: Stifftioideae
- Tribe: Stifftieae
- Genus: Stifftia; J.C.Mikan

Type species
- Stifftia chrysantha J.C.Mikan

Species
- See text

Synonyms
- Augusta Leandro; Aristomenia Vell.

= Stifftia =

Genus of trees

Stifftia is a genus of South American trees in the family Asteraceae. The genus is named in honour of Austrian physician Andreas Joseph von Stifft.

Species

- Stifftia cayennensis H.Rob. & B.Kahn - French Guiana
- Stifftia chrysantha J.C.Mikan - Bahia, Paraná, Minas Gerais, Rio de Janeiro, São Paulo
- Stifftia fruticosa (Vell.) D.J.N.Hind & Semir - Rio de Janeiro, São Paulo
- Stifftia hatschbachii H.Rob. - Espírito Santo
- Stifftia parviflora (Leandro) D.Don - Espírito Santo, Minas Gerais, Rio de Janeiro, São Paulo
- Stifftia uniflora Ducke - Amazonas, Pará, Amapá

formerly included

see Gongylolepis, Piptocarpha, Stenopadus, Stomatochaeta

- Stifftia axillaris - Piptocarpha stifftioides
- Stifftia benthamiana - Gongylolepis benthamiana
- Stifftia condensata - Stomatochaeta condensata
- Stifftia connellii - Stenopadus connellii
- Stifftia martiana - Gongylolepis martiana
