= Eurydochus =

Scientific classification
- Kingdom: Plantae
- Clade: Tracheophytes
- Clade: Angiosperms
- Clade: Eudicots
- Clade: Asterids
- Order: Asterales
- Family: Asteraceae
- Subfamily: Stifftioideae
- Tribe: Stifftieae
- Genus: Eurydochus; Maguire & Wurdack
- Species: E. bracteatus

Binomial name
- Eurydochus bracteatus Maguire & Wurdack,1958

Genus of flowering plants

Eurydochus is a genus of flowering plants in the family Asteraceae.

There is only one known species, Eurydochus bracteatus, native to Amazonas State in southern Venezuela and to its adjacent namesake, Amazonas State in northern Brazil.

formerly included

now in Gongylolepis

- Eurydochus cortesii S.Díaz, synonym of Gongylolepis cortesii (S.Díaz) Pruski & S.Díaz
