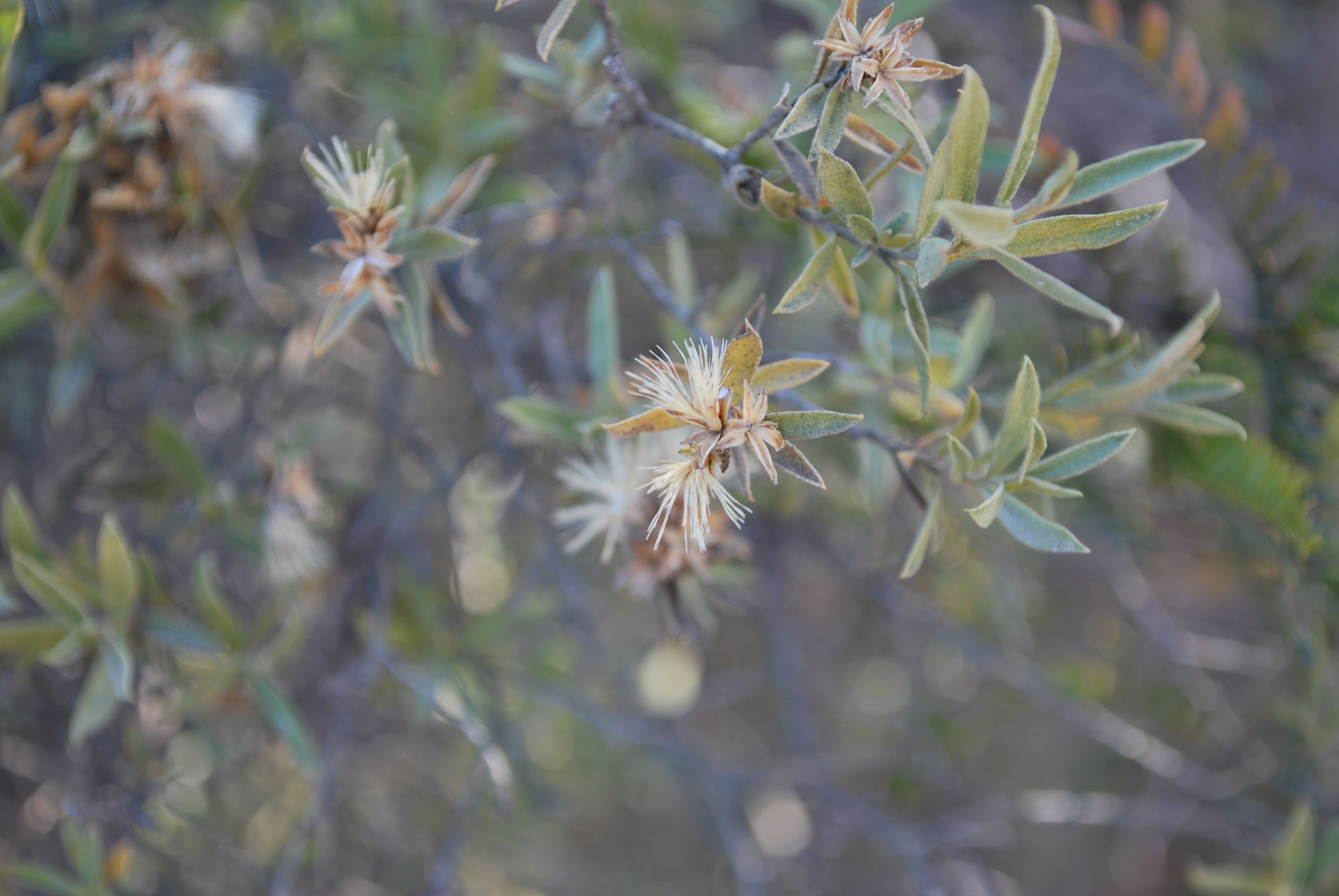
- Hyaloseris cinerea

Scientific classification
- Kingdom: Plantae
- Clade: Embryophytes
- Clade: Tracheophytes
- Clade: Angiosperms
- Clade: Eudicots
- Clade: Asterids
- Order: Asterales
- Family: Asteraceae
- Subfamily: Stifftioideae
- Tribe: Stifftieae
- Genus: Hyaloseris; Griseb.

Type species
- Hyaloseris cinerea Griseb.

Species
- See text

Synonyms
- Hyaloseris sect. Grapheioseris J.Koster

= Hyaloseris =

Genus of flowering plants

Hyaloseris is a genus of South American flowering plants in the family Asteraceae.

Species

- Hyaloseris andrade-limae Cristóbal & Cabrera - Santiago del Estero in Argentina
- Hyaloseris camataquiensis Hieron. ex Fiebrig. - Bolivia, Jujuy in Argentina
- Hyaloseris catamaquiensis Kosterm. - Jujuy in Argentina
- Hyaloseris cinerea (Griseb.) Griseb. - Catamarca in Argentina
- Hyaloseris longicephala B.L.Turner - Bolivia
- Hyaloseris quadriflora J.Koster - Bolivia
- Hyaloseris rubicunda Griseb. - Argentina (Catamarca, La Rioja, Salta, San Juan, Tucumán)
