= Karl August Gustav Fiebrig =

German-born Paraguayan botanist (1869–1951)

- Born: 25 May 1869; Hamburg
- Died: 25 October 1951 (aged 82); Tucumán, Argentina
- Citizenship: Paraguay
- Education: Humboldt University of Berlin
- Spouses: Anna Gertz (1866–1920), Ingeburg Fick
- Children: 4
- Scientific career
- Fields: Botany, Zoology
- Academic advisors: Adolf Engler
- Author abbrev. (botany): Fiebrig

Karl August Gustav Fiebrig-Gertz (25 May 1869, Hamburg – 25 October 1951, San Miguel de Tucumán) was a German-born Paraguayan botanist.

== Early life and education ==
He studied natural sciences in Berlin as a pupil of Adolf Engler.

== Career ==
In 1902 travelled to South America in order to collect botanical and entomological specimens for European museums. In 1903–04 he collected in Bolivia, followed by collection duties in Paraguay from 1904 to 1909.

From 1910 to 1936 he was a professor of zoology and botany at Asunción University. In 1914 at Asunción, he became founder-director of the Botanical Garden and Zoo of Asunción, of which, several parts were co-designed along with his wife, Anna Gertz.

In 1934–36 he was director of the Paraguayan Department of Agriculture until leaving Paraguay following the Chaco War. He and his family returned to Germany, where he worked as a lecturer at the Ibero-Amerikanisches Institut in Berlin (1936–1945).

In 1948 he returned to South America, where he worked as a botanist at the Instituto Miguel Lillo in Tucumán, Argentina.

== Honours and legacy ==
The plant genus Fiebrigiella (family Fabaceae) was named in his honor by Hermann Harms (1908).

== Selected works ==
- 1921. Algunos datos sobre aves del Paraguay. 9 pp.
- 1928. Un diptère ectoparasite sur un phasmide: ...
- 1910. Cassiden und cryptocephaliden Paraguays: ihre Entwicklungsstadien und Schutzvorrichtungen (Cassiden y cryptocephaliden de Paraguay: sus etapas de desarrollo y la protección). Volumen 12, Nº 2, comentarios zoológicos. Ed. G. Fischer. 264 pp.
- 1911. Ein Beitrag zun Pflanzengeographie Boliviens (Una contribución a la fitogeografía de Bolivia)
- karl Fiebrig, teodoro Rojas. 1933. Ensayo fitogeografico sobre el Chaco Boreal .... Ed. Imprenta nacional. 87 pp.
- m. Michalowski, karl Fiebrig, teodoro Rojas, juan Vogt. Los Árboles y arbustos del Paraguay. Volumen 3 de Revista del Jardín Botánico y Museo de Historia Natural del Paraguay. Ed. Centro de Información Agrícola Ganadera-STICA. 185 pp.
- 1932. Nomenclatura guaraní de vegetales del Paraguay. 25 pp.
- 1937. Was ist der Chaco? (¿Qué es el Chaco?). Ed. Ferd. Dümmler. 182 pp.
- 1937. Deutsche Missionsarbeit im Chaco (el trabajo misionero alemán en el Chaco). Ed. Ferd. 97 pp.
- 1940. Lebenszähe Pflanzen der südamerikanischen Flora (Plantas rusticadas de la flora de América del Sur). Ed. Friedländer. 114 pp.
- 1947. Nimm ... und sprich spanisch! (Tome ... y hable castellano!)
