= Glossarion =

Scientific classification
- Kingdom: Plantae
- Clade: Embryophytes
- Clade: Tracheophytes
- Clade: Angiosperms
- Clade: Eudicots
- Clade: Asterids
- Order: Asterales
- Family: Asteraceae
- Subfamily: Stifftioideae
- Tribe: Stifftieae
- Genus: Glossarion; Maguire & Wurdack

Type species
- Glossarion rhodanthum Maguire & Wurdack

Species
- G. bilabiatum (Maguire) Pruski; G. rhodanthum Maguire & Wurdack

Synonyms
- Guaicaia Maguire

Genus of flowering plants

Glossarion is a genus of South American flowering plants in the family Asteraceae.

Species

- Glossarion bilabiatum (Maguire) Pruski - Amazonas State in Venezuela and Amazonas State in Brazil
- Glossarion rhodanthum Maguire & Wurdack - Amazonas State in Venezuela and Amazonas State in Brazil
