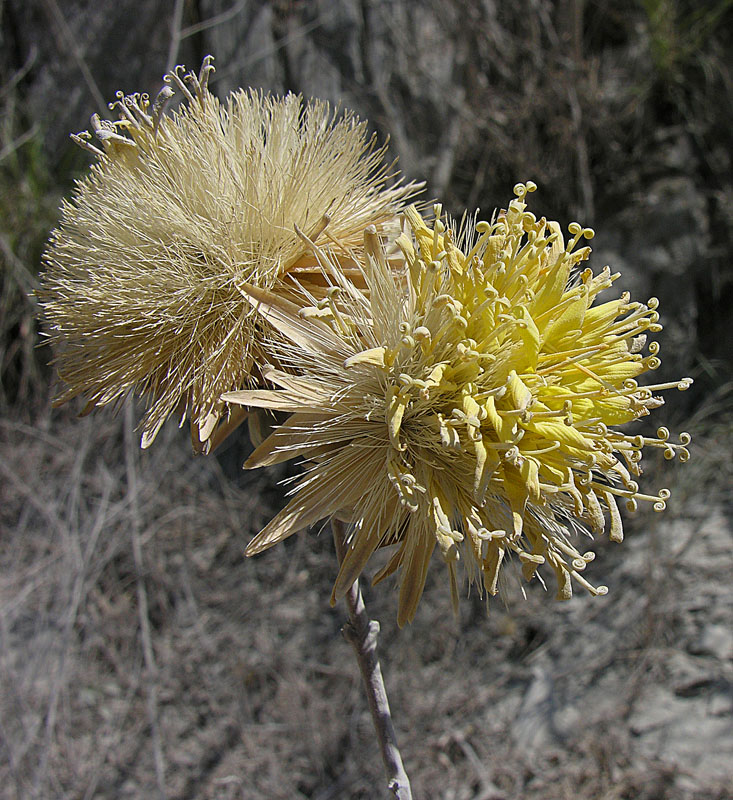

Scientific classification
- Kingdom: Plantae
- Clade: Tracheophytes
- Clade: Angiosperms
- Clade: Eudicots
- Clade: Asterids
- Order: Asterales
- Family: Asteraceae
- Subfamily: Stifftioideae
- Tribe: Stifftieae
- Genus: Dinoseris; Griseb.
- Species: D. salicifolia

Binomial name
- Dinoseris salicifolia Griseb.

Synonyms
- Dinoseris salicifolia var. araneosa Kuntze; Dinoseris salicifolia var. normalis Kuntze; Hyaloseris boliviensis J.Koster; Hyaloseris salicifolia (Griseb.) Hieron.

= Dinoseris =

Genus of flowering plants

Dinoseris is a monotypic genus of flowering plants in the family Asteraceae, containing the single species Dinoseris salicifolia. It is native to Bolivia and Argentina. It was formerly included in genus Hyaloseris.
