= Geneva Botanical Garden =

Botanical garden in Switzerland

Geneva Botanic Garden
- Jardin Botanique de Genève
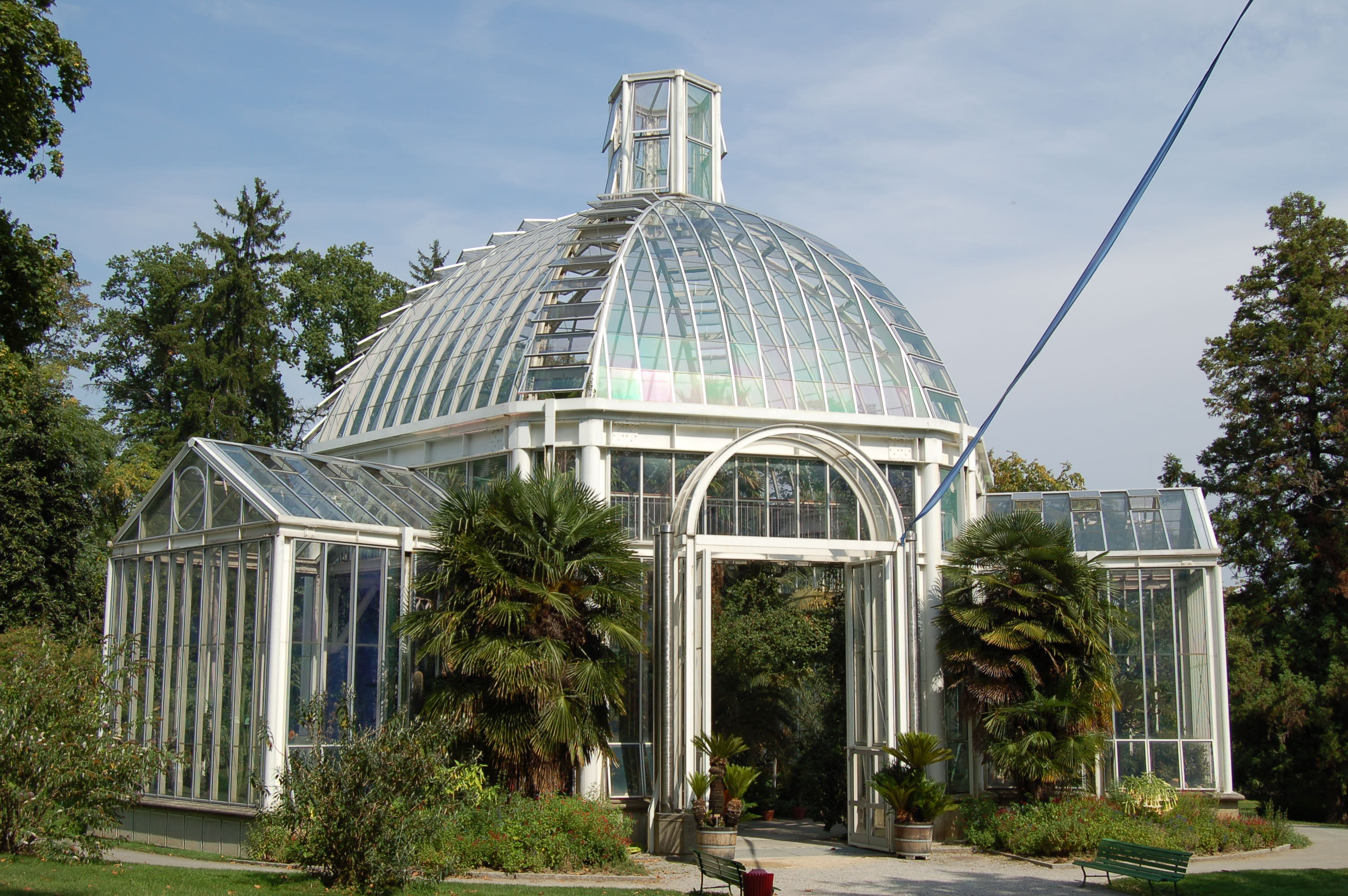
- The temperate greenhouse
- Interactive map of Geneva Botanic Garden
- Type: Botanical garden
- Location: Chemin de l’Impératrice 1 Chambésy,GE 1292; Switzerland
- Coordinates: 46°13′30″N 6°08′48″E
- Area: 28 hectares (69 acres)
- Opened: 1817; 209 years ago
- Visitors: 700'000 in 2024
- Species: >11'000
- Public transit: Geneva City Bus: Lines 1, 11, 22 and 25 stop Jardin Botanique; Geneva City Tramway: stop Maison de la Paix
- Website: www.cjbg.ch

The Geneva Botanic Garden (French: Jardin botanique de Genève; JBG) is a botanical garden in Geneva, Switzerland. Founded in 1817 by Augustin Pyramus de Candolle, it now covers 28 hectares and holds major scientific collections, including more than 11'000 taxa in its living collections. Its herbarium, with over six million preserved specimens, is among the largest in the world. The garden also maintains a specialist library of more than 160'000 volumes. In 2023, it recorded about 700'000 visits, making it the most visited attraction in the city.

== Establishment and location ==
It was founded in 1817 in a former area of Bastions Park in 1817 by Augustin Pyramus de Candolle. The Botanical Gardens were transferred to the Console site (192 rue de Lausanne) in 1904, constructed by the Genevan architect Henri Juvet in 1902–1904 specifically to house the Delessert herbarium held at Bastions. The collection grew in 1911–1912 with the gift of the Emile Burant herbarium, then again in 1923–1924 with the posthumous donation of the de Candolle herbarium. In its present location, it occupies an area of 28 hectares (69 acres) adjacent to Lake Geneva and the park of the United Nations Office at Geneva and ranks as one of the five most important in the world. The gardens themselves were designed by Jules Allemand. The Botanical Garden's greenhouses initially remained at the Bastions site for financial reasons. Then, in 1910–1911, the architect Henri Juvet built a Winter Garden along the former Chemin de Varembe, which was moved to its present location close to the railway lines following the construction of the Palais des Nations and the various associated urban redevelopments that took place. The elegant glass and iron structure is in line with constructions of this type in fashion in the second half of the 19th century. It originally comprised two adjacent but separate sections: the Winter Garden and a greenhouse, creating an asymmetrical effect. A symmetrical wing was added to the first in 1935. The greenhouses at Bastions were removed to make way for the Wall of the Reformers.

== Science ==
=== Plant collections ===
The botanical garden includes a living collection of 10'000 species of 249 different families from around the world. The library of over 220'000 volumes.

The living collection is divided into several sections: an arboretum, rock gardens and banks of protected plants, medicinal and useful plants, greenhouses, horticultural plants (including a "garden of scent and touch"). The garden also incorporates a zoo dedicated to conservation and the Botanicum (a family space) near the lake.

=== Herbarium ===
The herbarium of the Geneva Botanic Garden comprises several collections. The open-access general herbarium, cited under the Index Herbariorum code G, contains over 6.35 million specimens of plants, fungi, oomycetes and myxomycetes from around the world. The focus of the collection lies on the Mediterranean, Middle East, South America, Africa, Madacascar, Switzerland and regional flora. The collection is notable for its high number of type specimens, which are approximately 130'000 in total.

Alongside the general herbarium, Geneva maintains several separate historical herbaria, including the Herbier de Candolle (G-DC), which contains material used for the Prodrome and the Monographiae Phanerogamarum, and the Herbier du Flora Orientalis (G-BOIS), regrouped in the 1960s from specimens cited by Edmond Boissier in the five volumes of the Flora Orientalis. Other separate historical collections include the Burnat herbarium (G-BU) and the pre-Linnaean collection (G-PREL).

Part of the collection is searchable online through the Geneva Herbaria Catalogue.

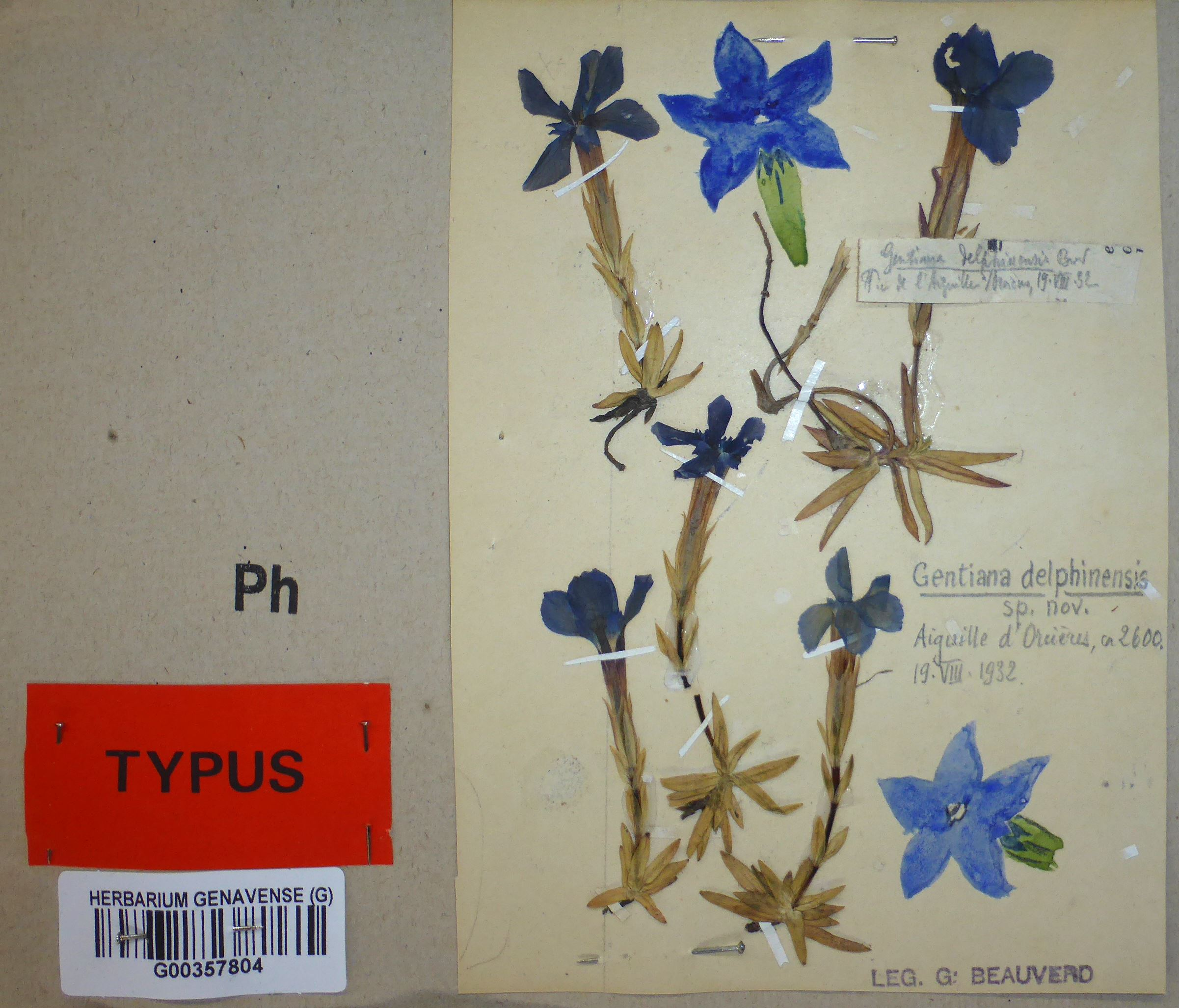
Holotype of Gentiana delphinensis

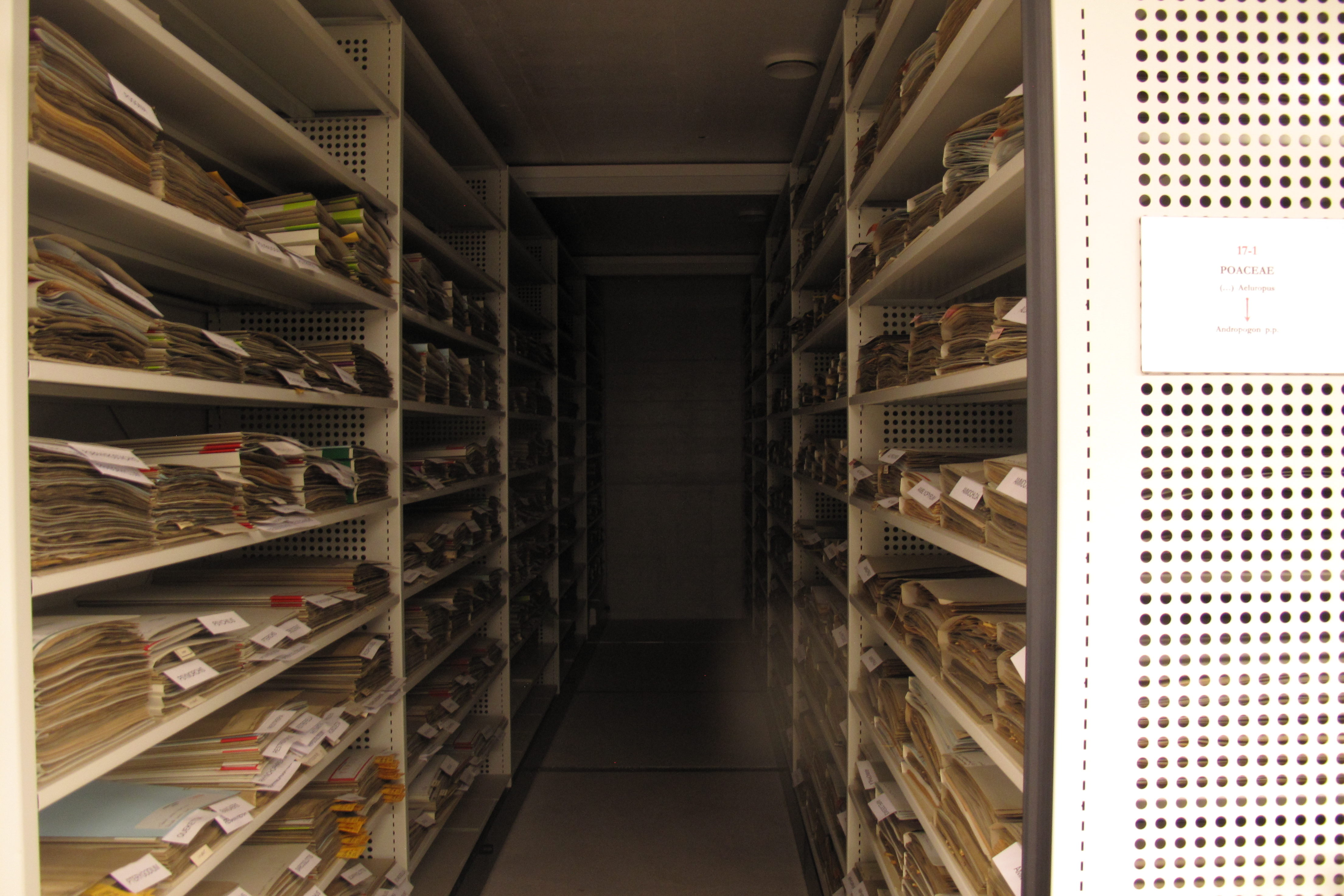
Geneva Herbarium storage area

=== Library and Archives ===
The botanic garden maintains a botanical library of more than 120'000 volumes, with particular strengths in plant taxonomy and floristics. Its heritage collections include pre-Linnaean and Linnaean works, periodicals, offprints, and reference works.

The garden's archives preserve around 70'000 unique manuscript items documenting botanical research in Geneva and beyond, including scientific correspondence, manuscripts such as Augustin Pyramus de Candolle's Prodrome, and iconographic material.

=== Seed bank ===
Established in 1999, the seed bank of the Geneva Botanic Garden stores seeds of threatened Swiss flora, especially species from Geneva and the Lake Geneva region. The collection has preserved more than 600 species, representing over 30% of the threatened flora of Switzerland and 57% of that of the canton of Geneva. Seeds are dried to about 5% moisture content and stored at −20 °C for long-term conservation and use in reintroduction and reinforcement projects. Together with the University of Zurich, the garden operates a two-site Swiss National Seed Bank, and it also participates in wider seed-conservation networks, including the Alpine Seed Conservation and Research Network.

=== Publication ===
The botanical garden produces Candollea, (Organe du Conservatoire et du Jardin Botaniques de la Ville de Genève). An international peer-reviewed journal that publishes original scientific papers, preferably in English but also in French. Published since 1922, yearly since 1924. It is named after Augustin Pyramus de Candolle founder of the garden.

== National classification ==
The entire garden, including greenhouses, libraries and collections, and two mansions "Le Chene" and "La Console", is registered as a cultural asset of national importance.

== Activities ==
The institution has a special interest in the medicinal plants of Paraguay, with about 5'000 known plants thanks to the legacy of the Guaraní people, preserved by the Jesuit missions and the collections of Emil Hassler. The Paraguayan Ethnobotany Project was established in the mid-1990s in collaboration with the Botanical Garden and Zoo of Asunción. This collaborative framework has facilitated the creation of a large herbarium of Paraguayan medicinal plants and the creation of the Centro de Conservación y Educación Ambiental (Center for Conservation and Environmental Education: CCEAM), located within the Botanical Garden of Asunción.

== Organic status ==
From 1 January 2015, under leadership of head gardener Nicolas Freyre and Director Pierre-André Loizeau, the Conservatory and Botanical Gardens became 100% organic, the first public garden in Switzerland to formally meet the standards of Bio Suisse. Although previously almost entirely organic, a bachelor student from the Haute École du paysage, d'ingénierie et d'architecture de Genève validated the requirements. In 2017 the garden will be able to display the Bio Suisse 'Bud' certification label on completion of the required qualification period.

== See also ==
- Plainpalais
