= Gongylolepis jauaensis =

Scientific classification
- Kingdom: Plantae
- Clade: Tracheophytes
- Clade: Angiosperms
- Clade: Eudicots
- Clade: Asterids
- Order: Asterales
- Family: Asteraceae
- Genus: Gongylolepis
- Species: G. jauaensis

Binomial name
- Gongylolepis jauaensis (Aristeg., Maguire & Steyerm.) V.M.Badillo

Synonyms
- Cardonaea jauaensis Aristeg., Maguire & Steyerm.

Species of flowering plant

Gongylolepis jauaensis is a species of flowering plant in the family Asteraceae. It is a tall shrub, with leaves borne in a rosette at the top of the stem, and is only found in the tepui highlands of Maigualida, Marahuaka and northern Amazonas Region (Venezuela). It is pollinated by bats.
