= Andreas Joseph von Stifft =

Austrian physician (1760–1836)

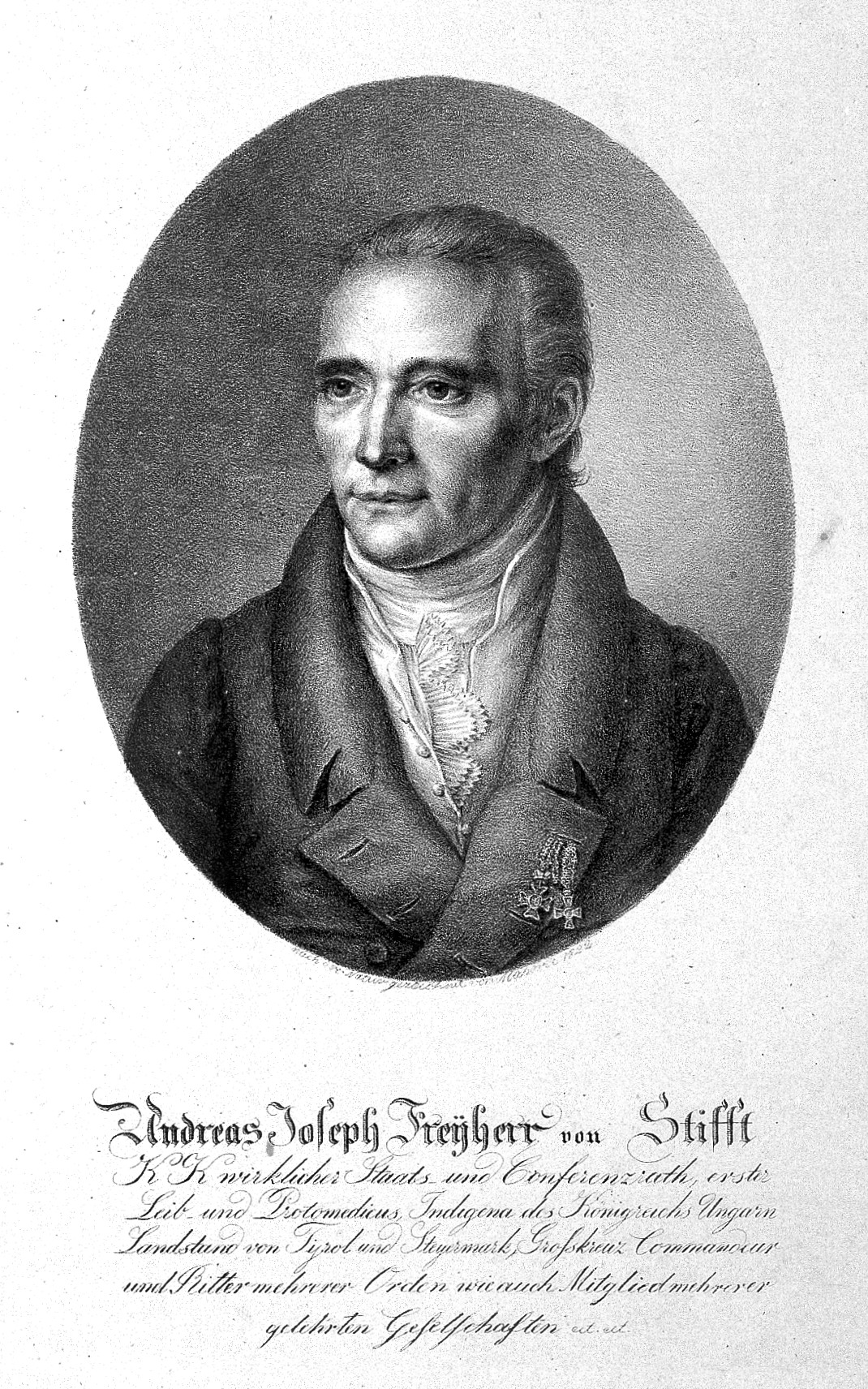

Andreas Joseph von Stifft (30 November 1760 – 16 June 1836) was an Austrian medical doctor who influenced the teaching of medicine in Austria. He became a royal physician and was ennobled in 1814. Although considered scientifically mediocre and even as "incompetent", he had great political influence that he used to change the course of medical study, enhancing the duration of study from four to five years and making a two-year clinical practice a condition for receiving a degree.

== Life and work ==
Stifft was born in Röschitz, Lower Austria, the son of a winegrower. He went to the University of Vienna to study medicine. After receiving his doctorate in 1784, he practiced in Vienna and began to take noble patients. He wrote a two-volume work on medical therapeutics in 1790-1792 which led to his being invited to reorganize the Josephinium Academy. He became a second physician to Vienna through the influence of Anton von Störck. In 1796 he became a court physician. In 1802 he became a councillor in the court and in 1803, following the death of von Störck he became personal physician to Emperor Franz I and followed him in campaigns from 1813 to 1815. He was ennobled in 1814 and elected to the Leopoldina Academy in 1818. He promoted the Vienna Medical School and introduced the natural sciences of chemistry, botany and pharmacy as courses for physicians. He had considerable influence and removed professors who he personally disliked including those who were well known for their competence including Johann Peter Frank (1745–1821), Johann Nepomuk Rust (1775–1840) and Johann Lucas Boër (1751–1835). He however encouraged Vincenz von Kern (1760–1829). In 1800 he stopped vaccination measures against smallpox. He helped establish a chair in forensic medicine in 1804. In 1807 he introduced some of the patterns followed in the Josephinium military academy of surgery into the civil surgery training. In 1812 he also established a university eye hospital. He was criticized during the cholera epidemic of 1831 in Vienna.

Von Stifft married Emilie Gosmar. He retired when he reached the age of fifty in 1834 and died in 1836. Von Stifft was buried in the Vienna Central Cemetery. A son Andreas von Stifft (1787–1861) became an economist and politician while grandson Andreas von Stifft (1819–1877) became a lawyer and writer. His position as medical advisor was taken over by son-in-law Johann von Raimann. The plant genus Stifftia was named in his honour.
