= Teodoro Rojas =

Paraguayan botanist (1877–1954)

- Teodoro Rojas Vera
- Born: August 25, 1877; Asunción
- Died: August 3, 1954 (aged 76)
- Spouse: Higinia Aguilera Martinez (m. 9 Nov 1907)
- Children: nine daughters
- Scientific career
- Fields: Botany
- Institutions: Botanical Garden and Zoo of Asunción
- Author abbrev. (botany): Rojas

Teodoro Rojas Vera (25 September 1877, Asunción – 3 September 1954) was a Paraguayan botanist.

== Early life and education ==
Born in Asunción, he was the son of Jose M. Rojas and Dolores Vera. He studied at national schools in Pilar and Limpio. In 1897, he went to Europe, studying at the School of Arts and Crafts in Aarau, Switzerland.

== Career ==
Rojas returned to Paraguay and from 1900 to 1915 was curator of the "Herbario Hassleriano", the herbarium collection of Swiss botanist, Emil Hassler. In 1906 he participated in an expedition to the Pilcomayo region, the collections from which formed the basis of Hassler's 1909 publication, Flora Pilcomayensis. Rojas collected plant material for three exsiccata-like specimen series distributed by Emil Hassler, namely the series Dr. E. Hassler, Plantae Paraguarienses. - 1903. Plantae a custode herbarii mei T. Rojas in Chaco septentrionali lectae, the series entitled Comision argentino-paraguaya de limites 1906. Plantae Pilcomayenses a custide herbarii Hassleriani Theodoro Rojas lectae and the specimen series Dr. E. Hassler, Plantae Paraguarienses 1907/08. Itinera in Paraguaria septentrionali (T. Rojas leg.). The plant material is now deposited in several major herbaria.

In 1916 he was appointed head of the herbarium and museum of natural history of the Botanical Garden and Zoo of Asunción where he worked for many years. During this time he continued to undertake regular expeditions collecting specimens of Paraguayan flora which he exchanged with other international collections and visitors to Asunción.

He worked closely with the Miguel Lillo Institute, Tucumán.

== Botanical eponymy ==
- Rojasia, circumscribed by Gustaf Oskar Andersson Malme in 1905.
- Rojasiophyton, circumscribed by Emil Hassler in 1910.
