= Fiebrigiella =

Scientific classification
- Kingdom: Plantae
- Clade: Tracheophytes
- Clade: Angiosperms
- Clade: Eudicots
- Clade: Rosids
- Order: Fabales
- Family: Fabaceae
- Subfamily: Faboideae
- Tribe: Dalbergieae
- Genus: Fiebrigiella; Harms (1908)
- Species: F. gracilis

Binomial name
- Fiebrigiella gracilis Harms (1908)

Genus of legumes

Fiebrigiella gracilis is a species of flowering plants in the legume family, Fabaceae. It is the only member of the genus Fiebrigiella. It belongs to the subfamily Faboideae, and was recently assigned to the informal monophyletic Pterocarpus clade of the Dalbergieae. It is a subshrub native to Ecuador, Peru, and Bolivia.

The genus Fiebrigiella was named in honor of German-Paraguayan botanist Karl August Gustav Fiebrig.
