= Salcedoa =

Scientific classification
- Kingdom: Plantae
- Clade: Tracheophytes
- Clade: Angiosperms
- Clade: Eudicots
- Clade: Asterids
- Order: Asterales
- Family: Asteraceae
- Subfamily: Stifftioideae
- Tribe: Stifftieae
- Genus: Salcedoa; Jiménez Rodr. & Katinas
- Species: S. mirabaliarum

Binomial name
- Salcedoa mirabaliarum Jiménez Rodr. & Katinas

Genus of plants

Salcedoa is a monotypic genus of flowering plants belonging to the family Asteraceae. The only species is Salcedoa mirabaliarum.

== Distribution and habitat ==
It is endemic to Hispaniolan moist forests near Salcedo, Hermanas Mirabal Province in the Dominican Republic. The Reserva Científica La Salcedoa (La Salcedoa Scientific Reserve) was established in order to protect the species.

== Etymology ==
The genus name, Salcedoa, refers to the former Salcedo province that the plant is endemic to. The specific epithet, mirabaliarum, refers to the Mirabal sisters, national heroines of the Dominican Republic who originated from the area.
