= Neblinaea =

Scientific classification
- Kingdom: Plantae
- Clade: Tracheophytes
- Clade: Angiosperms
- Clade: Eudicots
- Clade: Asterids
- Order: Asterales
- Family: Asteraceae
- Subfamily: Stifftioideae
- Tribe: Stifftieae
- Genus: Neblinaea; Maguire & Wurdack
- Species: N. promontoriorum

Binomial name
- Neblinaea promontoriorum Maguire & Wurdack

Genus of flowering plants

Neblinaea is a genus of flowering plants in the family Asteraceae.

Species

The only known species is Neblinaea promontoriorum, native to the State of Amazonas in Brazil and to the State of Amazonas in Venezuela.
