= Achnopogon =

Scientific classification
- Kingdom: Plantae
- Clade: Tracheophytes
- Clade: Angiosperms
- Clade: Eudicots
- Clade: Asterids
- Order: Asterales
- Family: Asteraceae
- Subfamily: Stifftioideae
- Tribe: Stifftieae
- Genus: Achnopogon; Maguire, Steyerm. & Wurdack

Type species
- Achnopogon virgatus Maguire, Steyerm. & Wurdack

Species
- A. steyermarkii Aristeg.; A. virgatus Maguire, Steyerm. & Wurdack

Genus of flowering plants

Achnopogon is a genus of flowering plants in the family Asteraceae, described as a genus in 1957.

The entire genus is endemic to Venezuela.

Species

- Achnopogon steyermarkii Aristeg. - State of Bolívar in southeastern Venezuela
- Achnopogon virgatus Maguire, Steyerm. & Wurdack - State of Bolívar in southeastern Venezuela
