= Duidaea =

Scientific classification
- Kingdom: Plantae
- Clade: Embryophytes
- Clade: Tracheophytes
- Clade: Angiosperms
- Clade: Eudicots
- Clade: Asterids
- Order: Asterales
- Family: Asteraceae
- Subfamily: Stifftioideae
- Tribe: Stifftieae
- Genus: Duidaea; S.F.Blake

Species
- D. marahuacensis Steyerm.; D. pinifolia S.F.Blake; D. rubriceps S.F.Blake; D. tatei S.F.Blake

Genus of flowering plants

Duidaea is a genus of Venezuelan flowering plants in the family Asteraceae.

The Duidaea is derived from the Cerro Duida (or Mount Duida) in Venezuela.

Species

- Duidaea marahuacensis Steyerm. - Venezuela
- Duidaea pinifolia S.F.Blake - Venezuela
- Duidaea rubriceps S.F.Blake - Venezuela
- Duidaea tatei S.F.Blake - Venezuela
