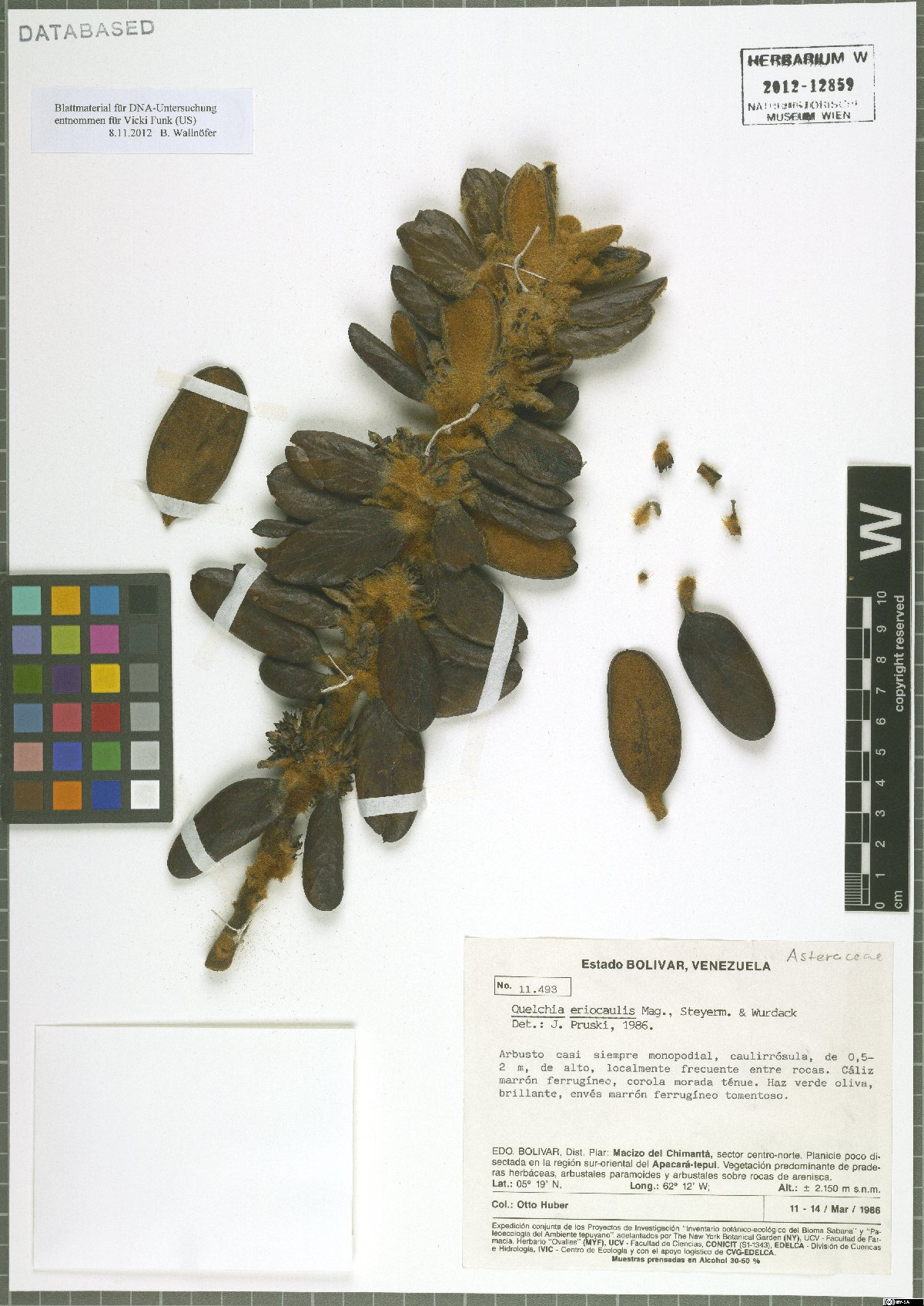

Scientific classification
- Kingdom: Plantae
- Clade: Embryophytes
- Clade: Tracheophytes
- Clade: Angiosperms
- Clade: Eudicots
- Clade: Asterids
- Order: Asterales
- Family: Asteraceae
- Subfamily: Stifftioideae
- Tribe: Stifftieae
- Genus: Quelchia; N.E.Br.

Type species
- Quelchia conferta N.E.Br.

Species
- See text

= Quelchia =

Genus of flowering plants

Quelchia is a genus of flowering plants in the family Asteraceae.

Species

- Quelchia ×grandifolia Maguire, Steyerm. & Wurdack - Venezuela
- Quelchia bracteata Maguire, Steyerm. & Wurdack - Venezuela
- Quelchia cardonae Steyerm. - Venezuela
- Quelchia conferta N.E.Br. - Venezuela, Guyana
- Quelchia eriocaulis Maguire, Steyerm. & Wurdack - Venezuela
