= Emil Hassler =

Swiss physician, ethnographer, naturalist and botanist

- Émile Hassler
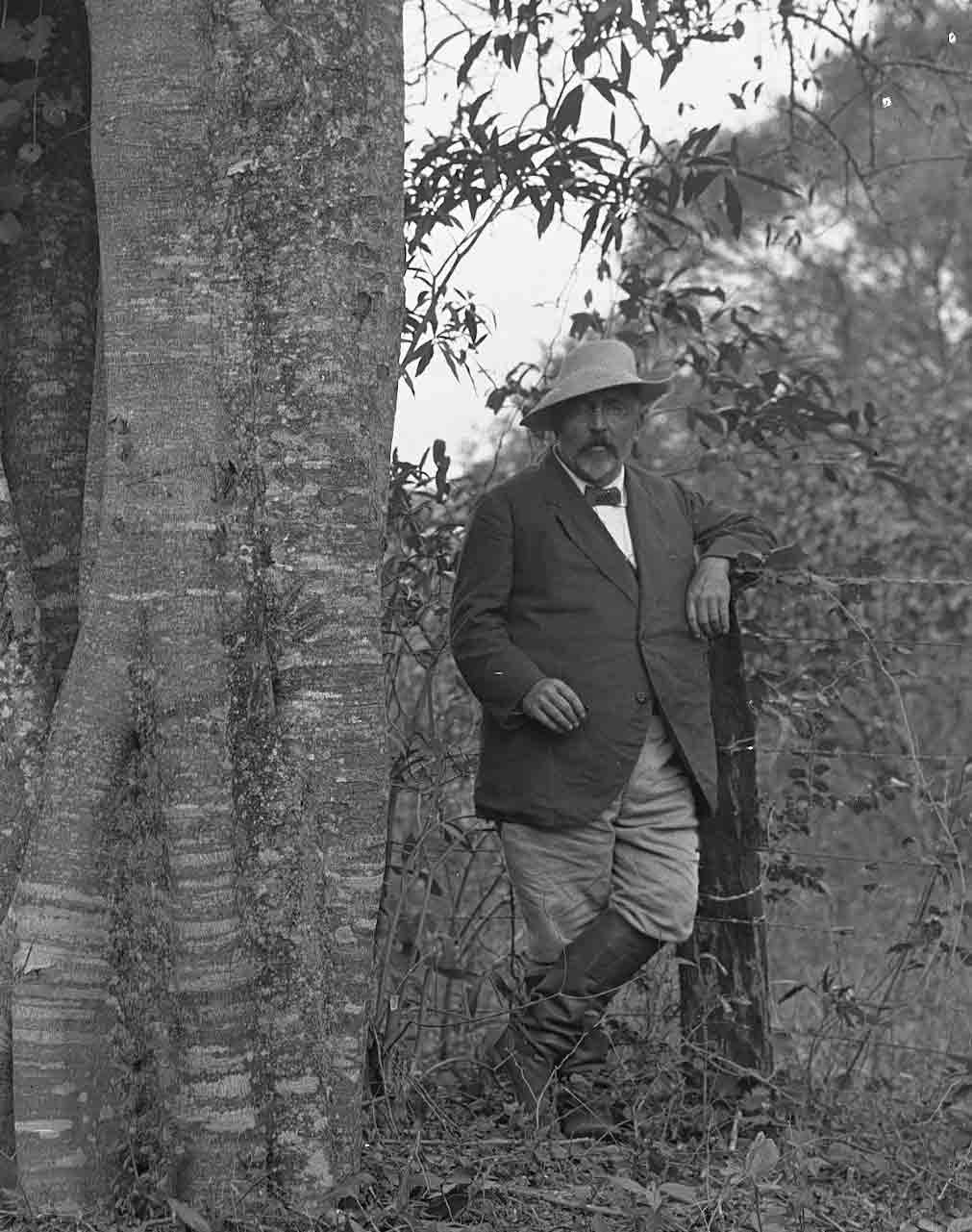
- Dr. Emil Hassler pictured at the Conservatoire et Jardin botaniques de la Ville de Genève
- Born: June 28, 1864; Aarau, Switzerland
- Died: November 4, 1937 (aged 73); Asunción, Paraguay
- Resting place: San Bernardino, Paraguay
- Education: Ecole des arts et métiers d'Aarau (1880-1882)
- Awards: Doctor honoris causa Universidad Nacional de Asunción 1934, Honorary Colonel, Paraguayan Army
- Scientific career
- Fields: medicine, botany
- Author abbrev. (botany): Hassl.

Emil Hassler (20 June 1864 – 4 November 1937) (French:Émile Hassler, Spanish: Emilio Hassler) was a Swiss physician, ethnographer, naturalist and botanist well known for his collections and contributions to the description of the flora and culture of Paraguay.

== Early life and education ==
Born in Aarau, Switzerland in 1864, the son of Johann Friedrich Hassler and Marie Stampfli, Hassler was educated at the Ecole des arts et métiers d'Aarau from 1880 to 1882. He studied medicine in France, completing his studies in Rio de Janeiro, Brazil.

== Career ==
In 1884 he began practising medicine in Cuiabá, Brazil. Between September 1885 and March 1887 he undertook his first voyage of exploration in the Matto Grosso of Brazil starting from Cuiabá, making his first ethnographic collections. In 1887 he moved to a hospital at San Bernardino near to Asunción in Paraguay.

In 1889 he was curator for Paraguay in the World Exhibition in Paris. In 1893 Hassler presented his ethnographic work at the Chicago World Fair.

He made his first botanical collections in 1895 and in 1896 considered returning to Switzerland settle permanently but, in 1897, decided, instead, to go to Paraguay for more botanical exploration. These led to the 1898 publication of the first part of Plantae Hasslerianae published in the academic journal, Bulletin de l'Herbier Boissier, with further parts published through to 1907.

In June 1898 he moved to San Bernardino and built his first house in Bierschlucht. Between 1898 and 1908 he undertook several botanical exploration trips nationwide, primarily in the Eastern region with collaborator Teodoro Rojas. He regularly returned to Switzerland during this period and, in 1909 he moved more permanently, settling in Pinchat near Geneva. He researched his collections, publishing numerous studies, some in conjunction with Robert Chodat who accompanied him on a further field trip to Paraguay in 1914. In 1919 Hassler deposited his personal herbarium collection in the Geneva Botanical Garden whose director, Dr John Briquet, was a personal friend. In 1920 he returned to Paraguay to definitively settle in San Bernardino. He built "Villa Mon Repos" as his second home but continued to travel regularly back to Switzerland. In 1921 he participated in the foundation of the Sociedad Científica del Paraguay (Scientific Society of Paraguay), of which he became honorary president.

Villa Mon Repos in San Bernardino
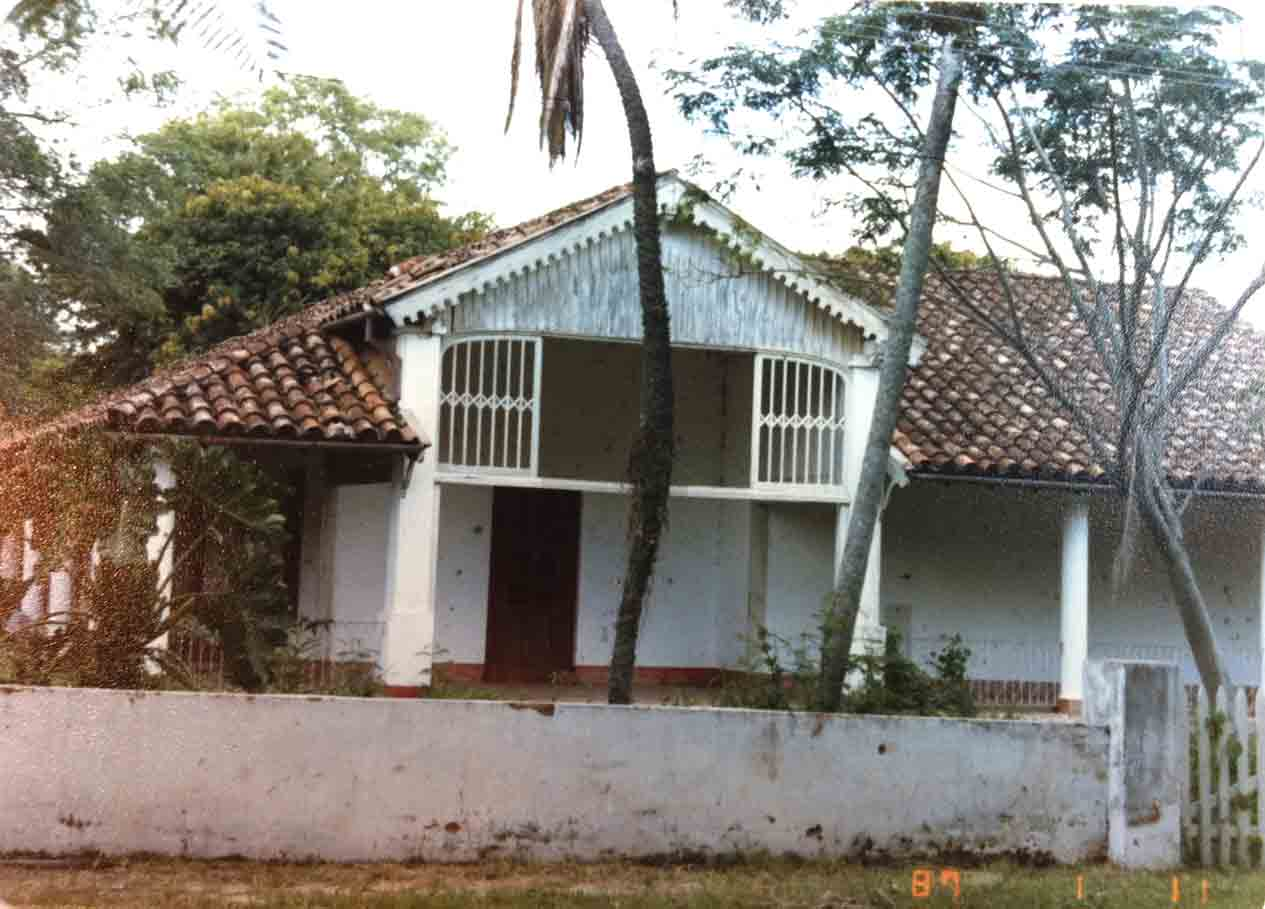

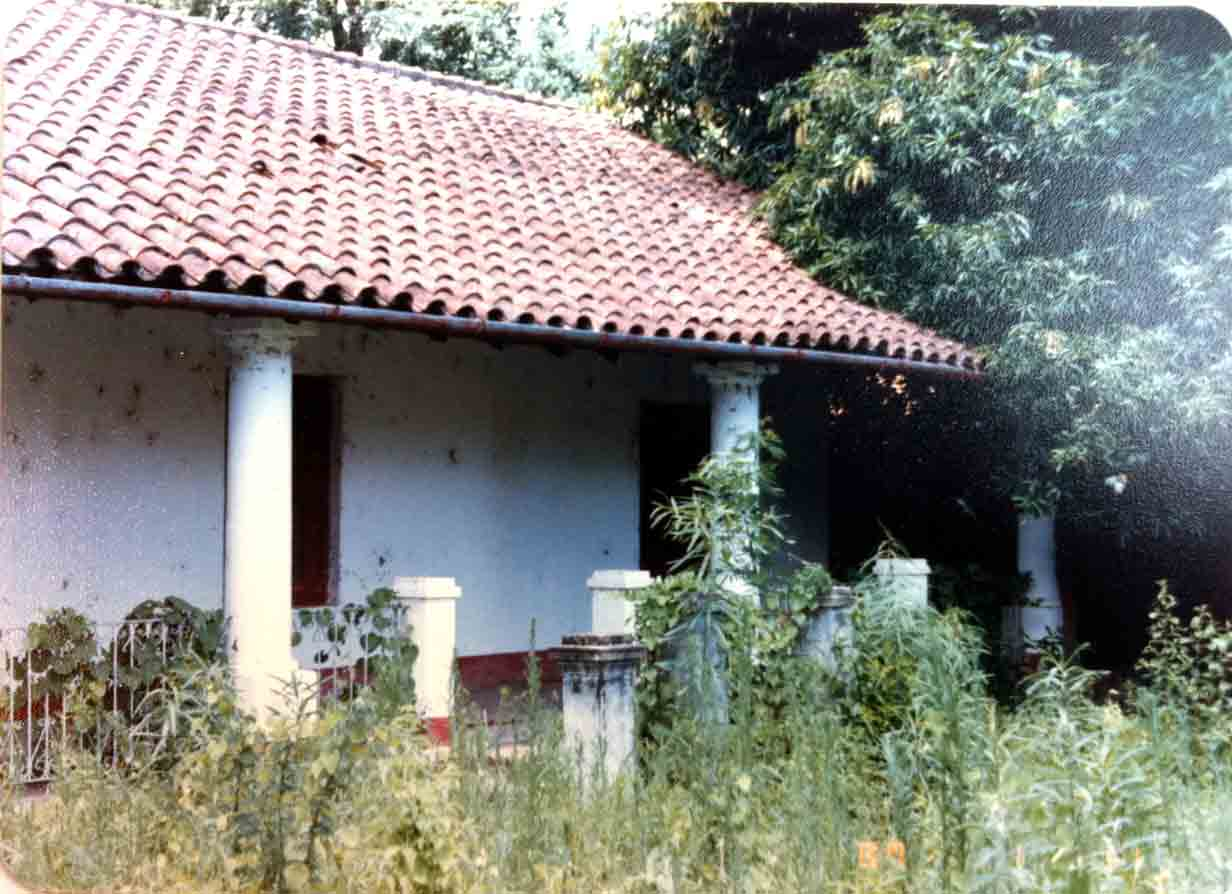
Hassler's villa Mon Repos in San Bernardino, January 1987

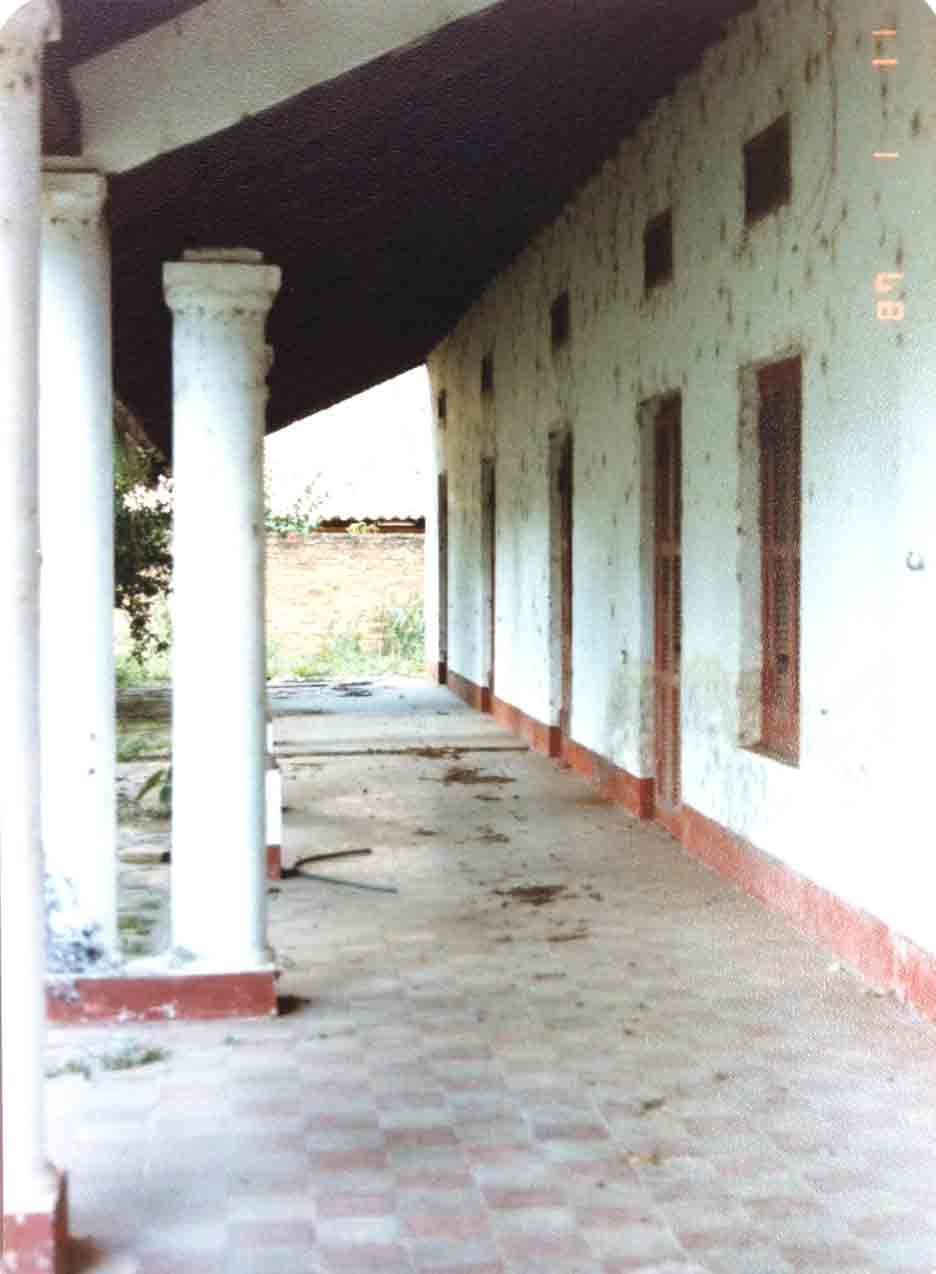

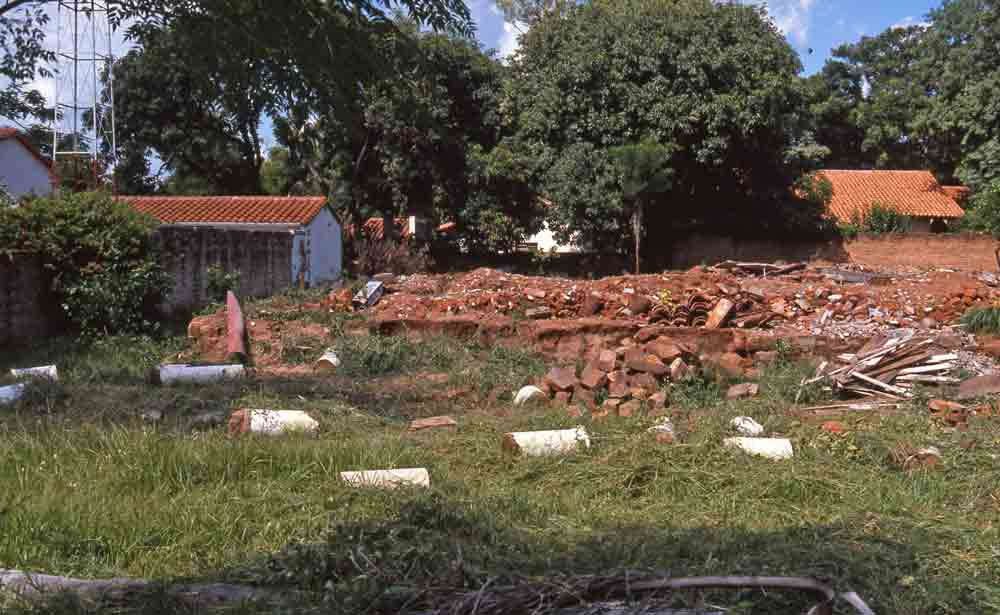
January 1989: demolition of Villa Mon Repos

In 1932, during the Chaco War between Bolivia and Paraguay he established and ran a hospital for the wounded in San Bernardino, working there as a surgeon, and was awarded the honorary rank of Colonel in the Paraguayan Army. On 28 October 1934 he was awarded Doctorate Honoris Causa by the Universidad Nacional de Asunción in recognition of his outstanding work.

Hassler's grave in San Bernardino Cemetery
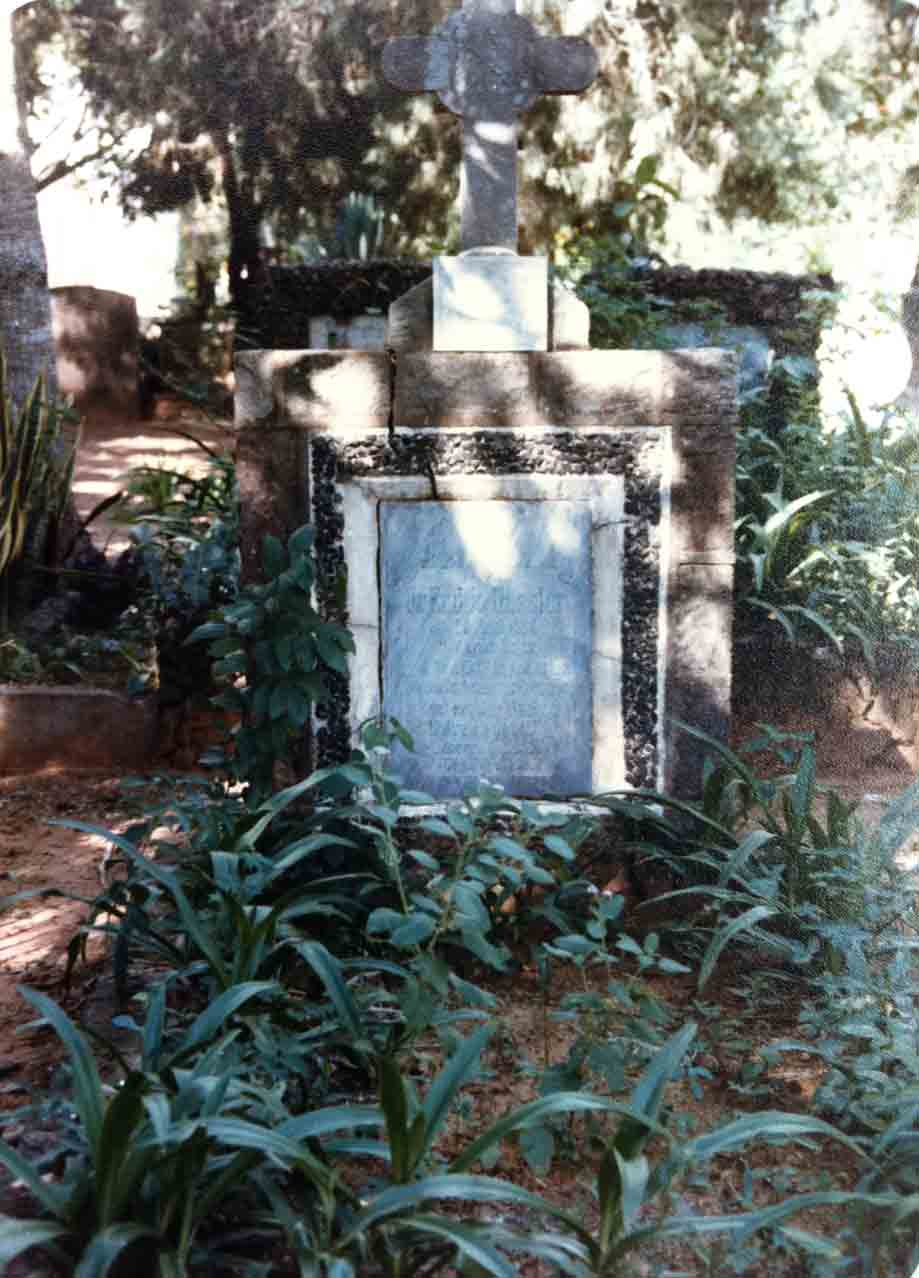
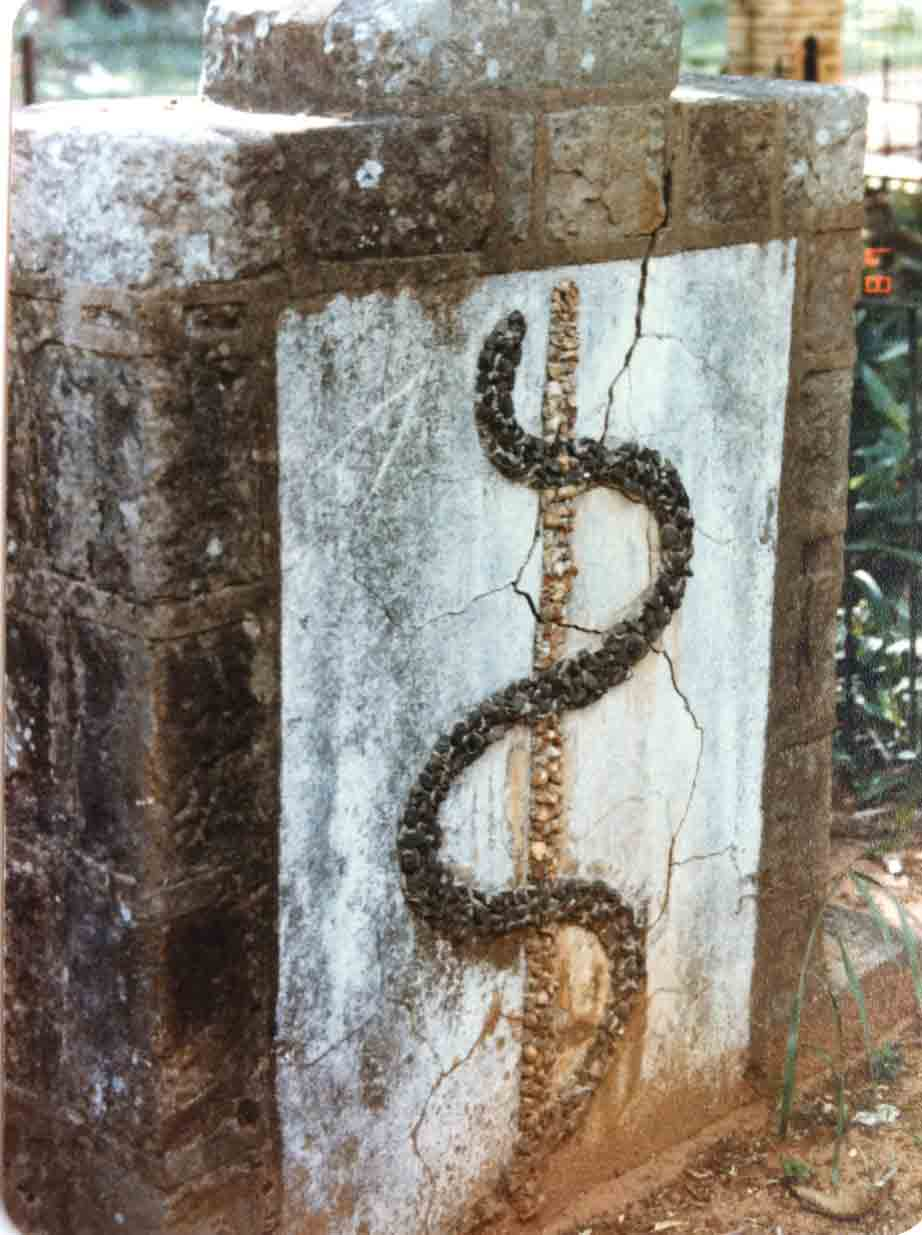
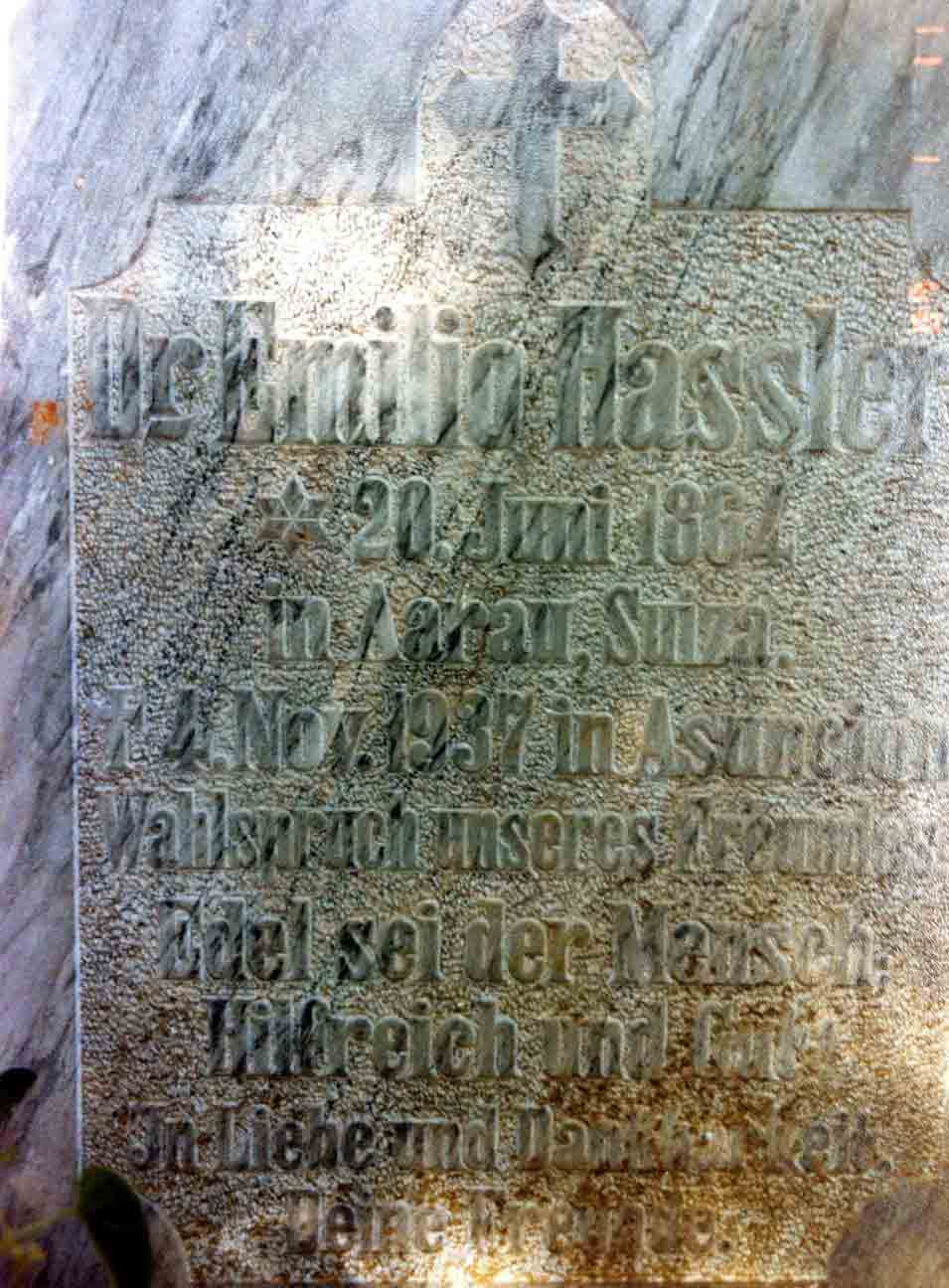

In August 1935, at the end of the Chaco War, the hospital in San Bernardino was closed and Hassler undertook what was to be his final trip to Switzerland. On 4 November 1937 he died in Asunción and was buried in the cemetery of San Bernardino in Paraguay.

== Ethnographic collections ==
The ethnographic collections of about 5,000 items collected by Emil Hassler in northern Paraguay and Chaco and displayed at the World's Columbian Exposition in Chicago in 1893 were acquired by the Field Museum, Chicago. Some items from the collection were subsequently exchanged with the pre-Columbian Native American collections of the New Brunswick Museum, Canada.

Other ethnographic collections of about 10,000 items made during Hassler's expeditions between 1885 and 1895 were purchased in 1919 by the Museum of Cultures, Basel, Switzerland. In 1920, a part of these collections was gifted to the Museum of Ethnography of Geneva.

== Botanical collections ==
Hassler's botanical collections constitute the foundation of scientific knowledge of the flora of Paraguay. Collected between 1885 and 1919 by Hassler himself or under his direction, it is estimated that 90% of Paraguay's existing species are represented in his collection. Specimens were deposited in Asunción, sent to Geneva and other major global herbaria.

The collection numbers about 13,000 or about 60,000 if duplicated specimens are included. A complete catalogue of these, inclusive of other collectors' related collections from Paraguay, (Catalogus Hasslerianus, 2008-), is being published and made available online. Hassler´s about ten series of (duplicate) specimens superficially resemble exsiccatae, but the labels are partly handwritten and the numbers are collection numbers. They were distributed under various titles and subtitles, among them Dr. E. Hassler, Plantae Paraguarienses (1898-1913), Dr. E. Hassler, Plantae Paraguarienses. - 1903. Plantae a custode herbarii mei T. Rojas in Chaco septentrionali lectae and Dr. E. Hassler, Plantae Paraguarienses. - 1905. Florula Cordillerae Villaricensis. The collections formed the basis of the description of many new species, published in the work Plantae Hasslerianae in several parts between 1898 and 1907 as well as subsequent studies both by Emil Hassler and by others. These collections serve today as a basis for drafting a flora of Paraguay. Hassler's specimens are of a high quality and include all parts necessary for identification. The attention to detail, including the formal composition of the specimen, the conservation status, etc. make these collections a very important resource for taxonomic studies of the flora of Paraguay. These qualities were demonstrated in a public exhibition at the Museum of the History of Science, Geneva in 2002.

After his death in 1937, the deposit of his botanical collection at the Geneva Botanical Garden was bequeathed to the city of Geneva. Hassler's library was purchased and is preserved in the National Library of Venezuela in Caracas.

== Selected publications ==
- Hassler, Emil; Chodat, R. (1898). "Plantae Hasslerianae soit énumération des plantes récoltées par le Dr. Émile Hassler, d'Aarau (Suisse) et déterminées par le Prof. Dr. R. Chodat avec l'aide de plusieurs collaborateurs". Bulletin de l'Herbier Boissier. Geneva: Romet. (Alternative online version at the Internet Archive.)
- Chodat, R.; Hassler, E. (1903). "Plantae Hasslerianae, soit énumération des plantes récoltées au Paraguay par le Dr. Emile Hassler. Deuxième partie". Bulletin de l'Herbier Boissier. 2 (1). Geneva: Université de Genève, Institut de Botanique.
- Rodrigues, J. Barbosa; Hassler, E. (1903), Myrtaceés du Paraguay : recueillies par Mr. le Dr. Émile Hassler, Brussels: J. Goffin Fils J. De Grève, Succr. (Online version(subscription required) at JSTOR)
- Plantæ paraguarienses novæ vel minus cognitæ. 2. Vol. VII. 1907.
- Hassler, Emil (1909). Contribuciones á la flora del Chaco argentino-paraguayo (in Spanish). Buenos Aires: La Semana Médica.
- Hassler, Emil (1928). "Pteridophytorum paraguariensium et regionum argentinarum adjacentium conspectus criticus. : Enumeración de las pteridófitas del Paraguay, Misiones argentinas y Gran Chaco conocidas hasta fines del año 1921". Trabajos del Instituto de botánica y farmacología (in Latin) (45). Buenos Aires: Facultad de ciencias médicas de Buenos Aires.
