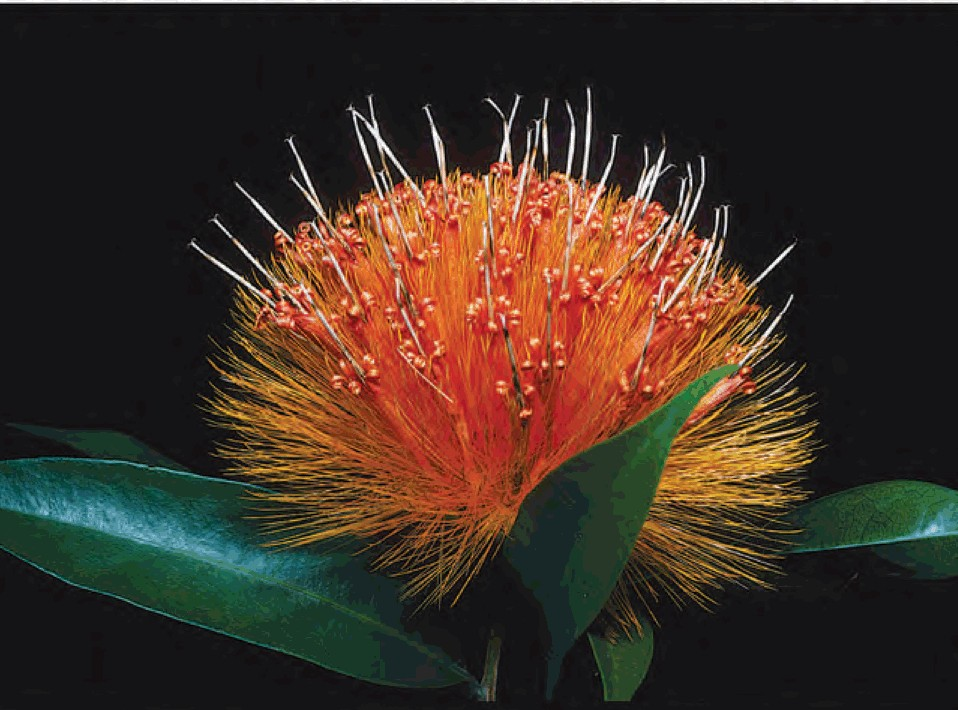

Scientific classification
- Kingdom: Plantae
- Clade: Tracheophytes
- Clade: Angiosperms
- Clade: Eudicots
- Clade: Asterids
- Order: Asterales
- Family: Asteraceae
- Genus: Stifftia
- Species: S. chrysantha

Binomial name
- Stifftia chrysantha J.C.Mikan

= Stifftia chrysantha =

Species of plant

Stiffia chyrsantha is a species of flowering plant in the family Asteraceae, endemic to Brazil. It has a woody stem with rough bark, and can grow to 8–10 ft (2.4–3.0 m). It has alternate, entire smooth leaves and reticulate veins. The involucre has 30 to 40 green, imbricated scales with short hairs. Actinomorphic corollas are pale orange below and darker above.

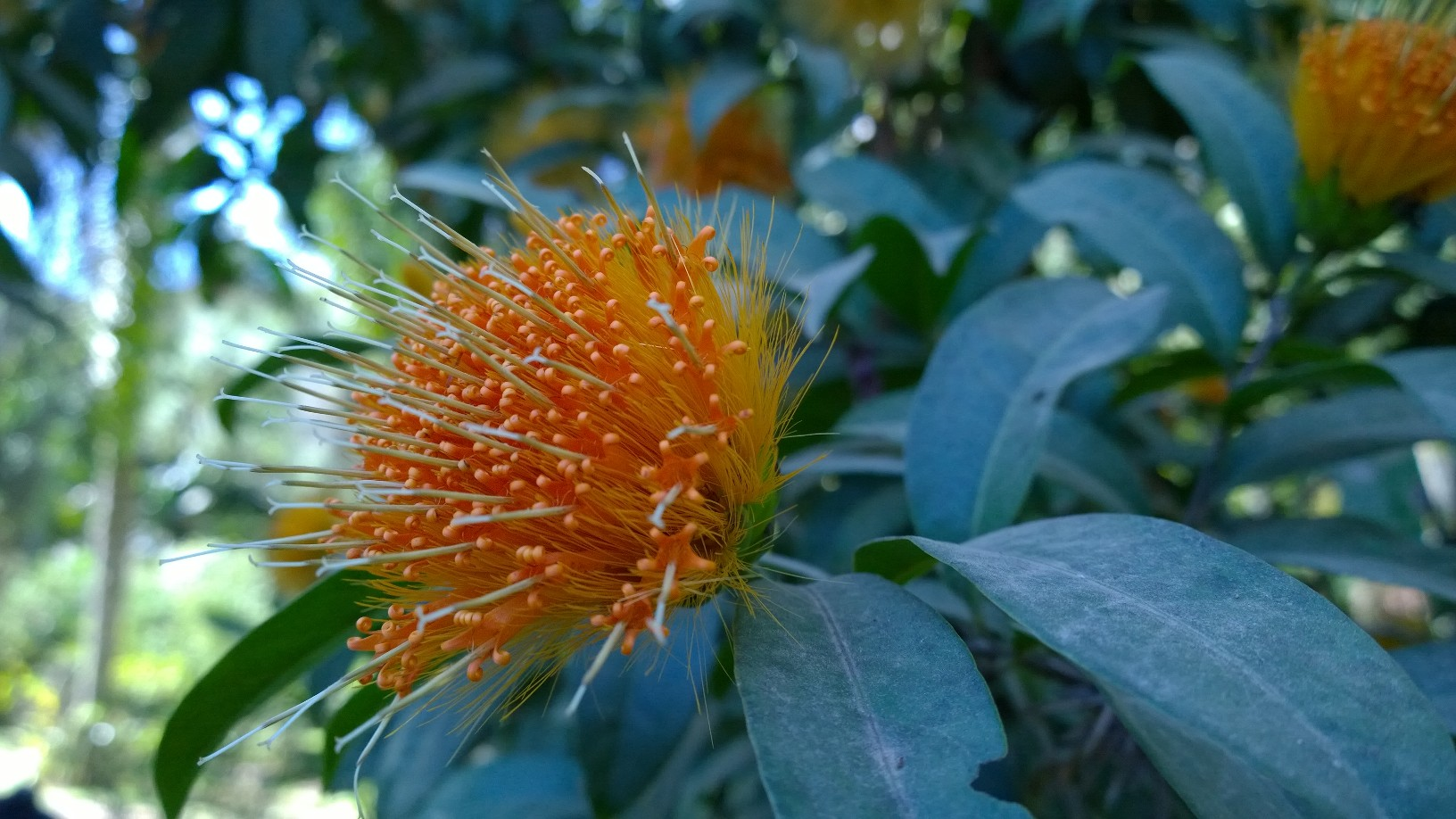

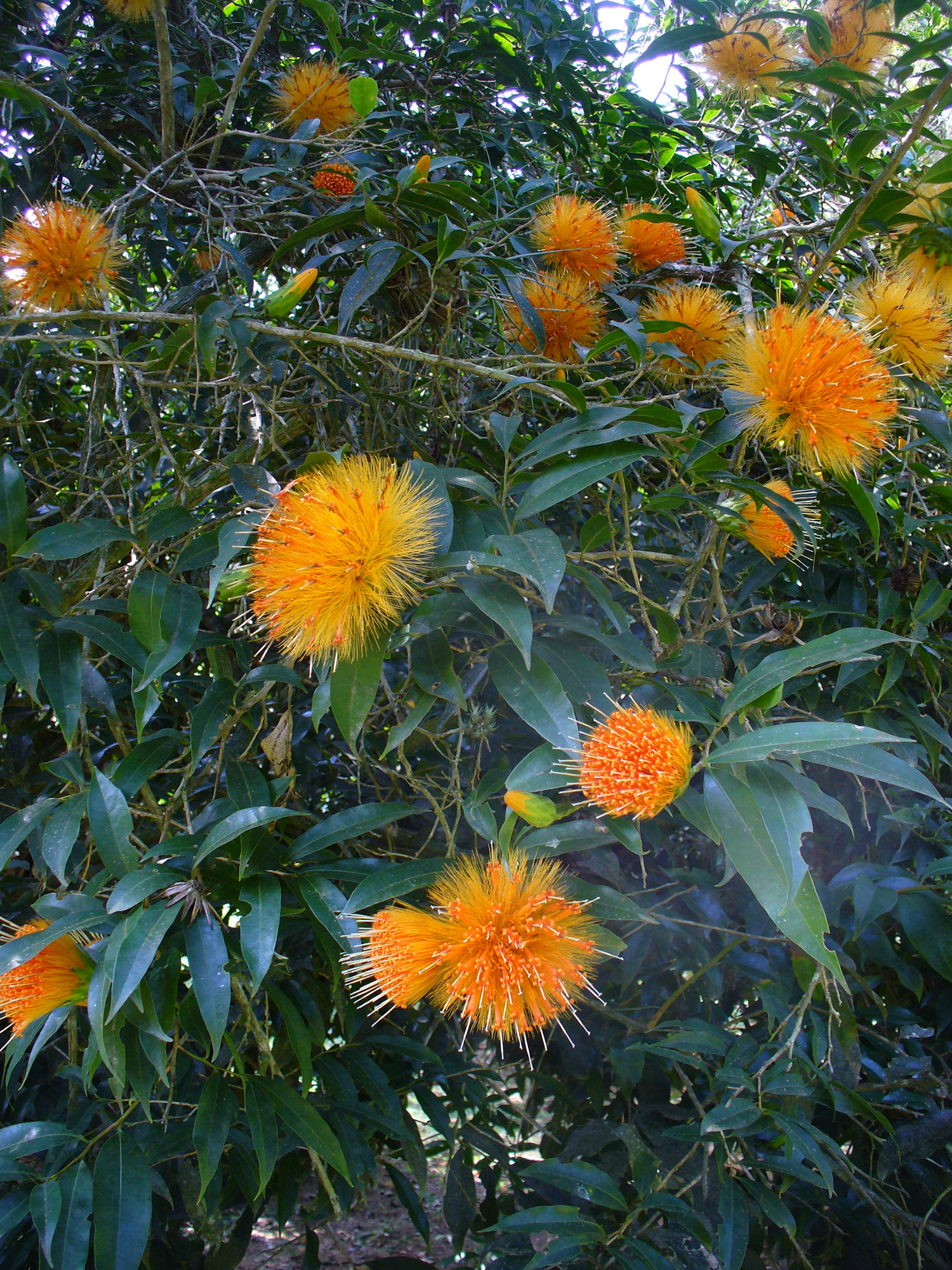
