= Botanical Garden and Zoo of Asunción =

- Jardín Botánico y Zoológico de Asunción
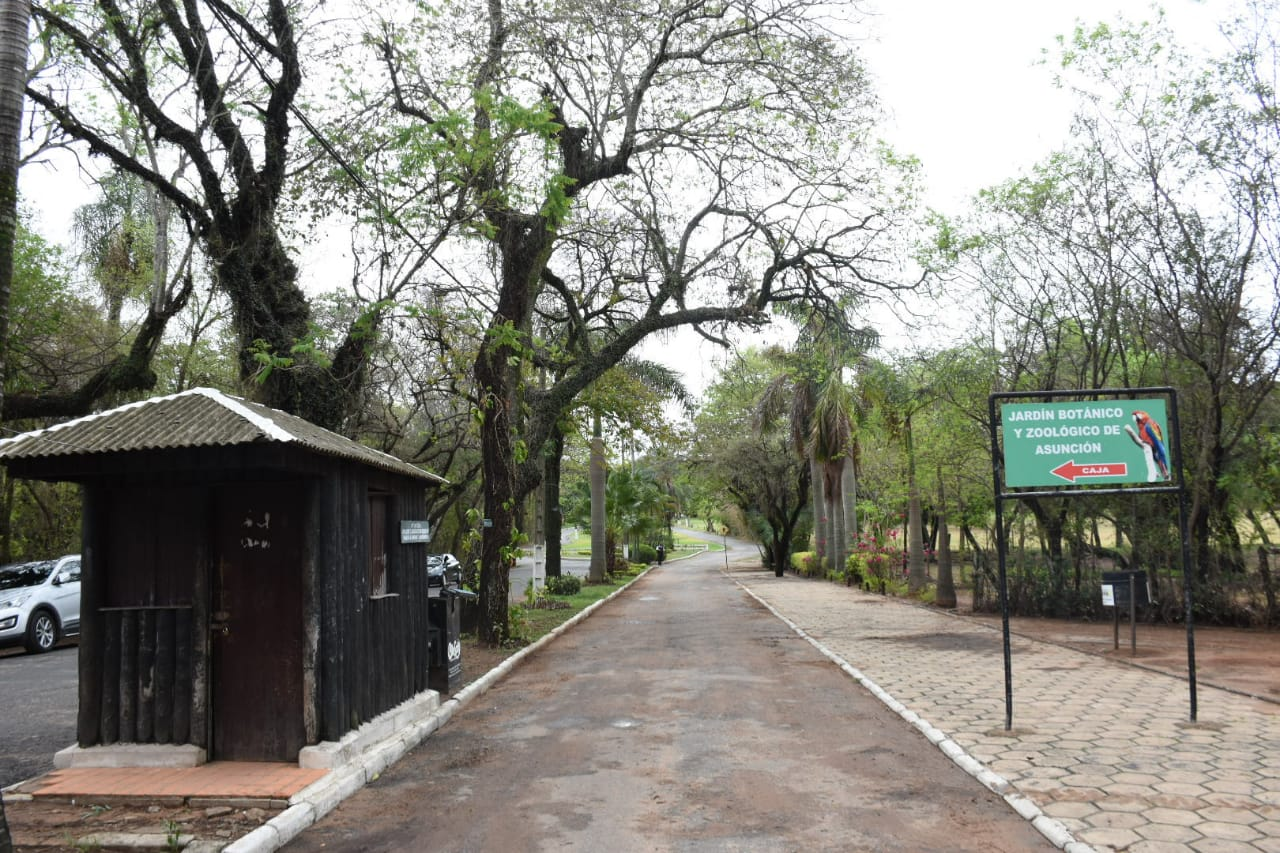
- Entrance to the garden and zoo
- Interactive map of Botanical Garden and Zoo of Asunción
- Motto: Natura miranda en maximum minimis investigacioni rerum naturalium Paraguarie consecrata
- Location: Asunción, Paraguay
- Coordinates: 25°14′55.58″S 57°34′23.09″W
- Area: 110 hectares (270 acres)
- Created: 1914
- Founder: Karl Friebig
- Designer: Anna Gertz
- Operator: Municipalidad de Asunción
- Open: Open all year
- Camp sites: one (public)
- Plants: 23065
- Director: Maris Llorens
- Website: www.mca.gov.py/zoo.htm

Asunción Zoo
- Interactive map of Asunción Zoo
- No. of animals: 337
- No. of species: 64

The Botanical Garden and Zoo of Asunción (Spanish: Jardín Botánico y Zoológico de Asunción) is a botanical garden and zoo located in Asunción, capital of the Republic of Paraguay.

The Botanical Garden and Zoo is one of the principal open spaces of the city of Asunción, set in natural forest covering 110 hectares (270 acres) to the north of the city. The zoo is home to nearly seventy species of wildlife including birds, mammals and reptiles, mostly representing the fauna of South America. The botanical garden is home to native species, exhibiting, in particular, the variety and beauty of its lush trees.

== History ==
This sprawling property was the former country house and estate of Carlos Antonio López, president of Paraguay between 1842 and 1862. Lopez ordered the construction of "Casa Lopez" as his home in the 1840s. Besides its historical value, the main building is very representative of the era in which it was built, in terms of technology, architecture and decoration, and is registered in the "Catalogue of Buildings and Sites of Urban Planning, architectural, Historical and Artistic Heritage of the city of Asunción", and specially protected by Law 946/82 "Protection of Cultural Property".

In 1896, Lopez's descendants sold the estate to the Agricultural Bank, by then in state ownership.

The garden was created as such in 1914 by German scientists Karl Freibig and his wife, Anna Gertz. Fiebrig was professor of botany and zoology at the University of Asunción, having settled in Paraguay in 1910 following plant and insect collecting trips to Paraguay for European museums between 1904 and 1909. Fiebrig founded a school of Agriculture in 1916. Fiebrig also founded a "Cotton Institute" which helped fund the garden complex. The zoo was subsequently established by the same scientists, with a very advanced approach for the time, housing the animals in a setting as close as possible to their natural habitat. Gertz is credited with much of the landscape design of the gardens, though some projects were truncated following her death in May 1920. She was buried in the gardens.

Fiebrig continued as director of the garden and zoo, and remarried in 1925. In addition to his professorship, in 1934, was also made director of the Paraguayan Department of Agriculture. In 1936, in the aftermath of the Chaco War, a wave of xenophobic sentiment forced Fiebrig to leave Paraguay with his second wife and family. Responsibility for the estate passed from the state to its present owner, the Municipality of Asunción.

Historically, the estate covered more than 600 hectares (1,500 acres), and had over 1 km frontage along the bank of the Paraguay River, a port, a railway station and 60 km of road network. In the last 50 years, there have been several incursions, such as the riverside Empresa de Servicios Sanitarios del Paraguay (ESSAP) Viñas Cué water treatment plant, the Copaco transmission station (built at the time of dictator Stroessner), the Asunción Golf Club, laid out by Fiebrig, and several other divisions due to illegal occupations.

Since 2013 the garden and zoo's director has been Maris Llorens.

== Facilities and collections ==
The facilities include:

- Botanical Garden: Originally called a botanical garden just because of the exuberant natural flora. Its trees are now over 150 years old and provide visitors with welcome shade.
- Nursery: cultivating more than 500 species of plants, many of them medical, used for educational interpretation about the properties of herbs.
- Zoo: It has about 64 species of animals, mammals, birds, reptiles and others. Its iconic exhibit is the Tagua, a species of peccary that inhabits the Paraguayan Chaco, initially believed extinct, which was rediscovered in the 1980s.
- Natural History Museum: located in a former farmhouse of Carlos Antonio Lopez's estate.
- Golf: For 50 years, the municipality of Asunción has ceded part of its space to various institutions, one of them being Asunción Golf Club. While still part of the Botanical Garden premises, it is managed completely independently.

=== Botanical Garden and Nursery ===
The nursery is located behind the Upper House and contains over 500 species specialising in medicinal plants. It is open to the public and works in cooperation with the Botanic Garden and Conservatory of the City of Geneva, Switzerland.

Established for over 10 years, it has undertaken investigations into the cultivation, distribution and introduction of plants, specifically native, but also medicinal plants introduced by Paraguayan settlers.

The work of the Conservatory is to preserve the culture of the knowledge of medicinal plants in Paraguay. "The Paraguayan people consume herbs and know the use of at least 50 species. The work of the nursery is to investigate cultivation, harvesting and propagation and to use that knowledge for education".

Among its collections are:

- The medicinal plant nursery, being a place of agricultural research, education and training of its cultivation, with about 500 cultivated species.
- Agronomic nursery plants, with culture and selection for improved Paraguayan crop plants.

On 4 May 2006 the gardens launched the exhibition Ethnobotany 2006 "Our plants, our people" ("Nuestras Plantas, Nuestra Gente"), under the Paraguayan Ethnobotany Project (EPY) (which lasted for about ten years), with the support of the Conservatory and Botanical Garden of the City of Geneva and under the auspices of the organization Tesãi Reka Paraguay (TRP).

The project helped improve the botanical garden and created a large Paraguayan medicinal plant collection and the Center for Conservation and Environmental Education (CCEAM) located in the Botanical Garden, which develops numerous educational activities.

=== Zoo ===
The zoo is located on the same site as the botanical garden. The zoo's collections focus on the fauna of Paraguay but include animals from elsewhere.

==== Mammals ====
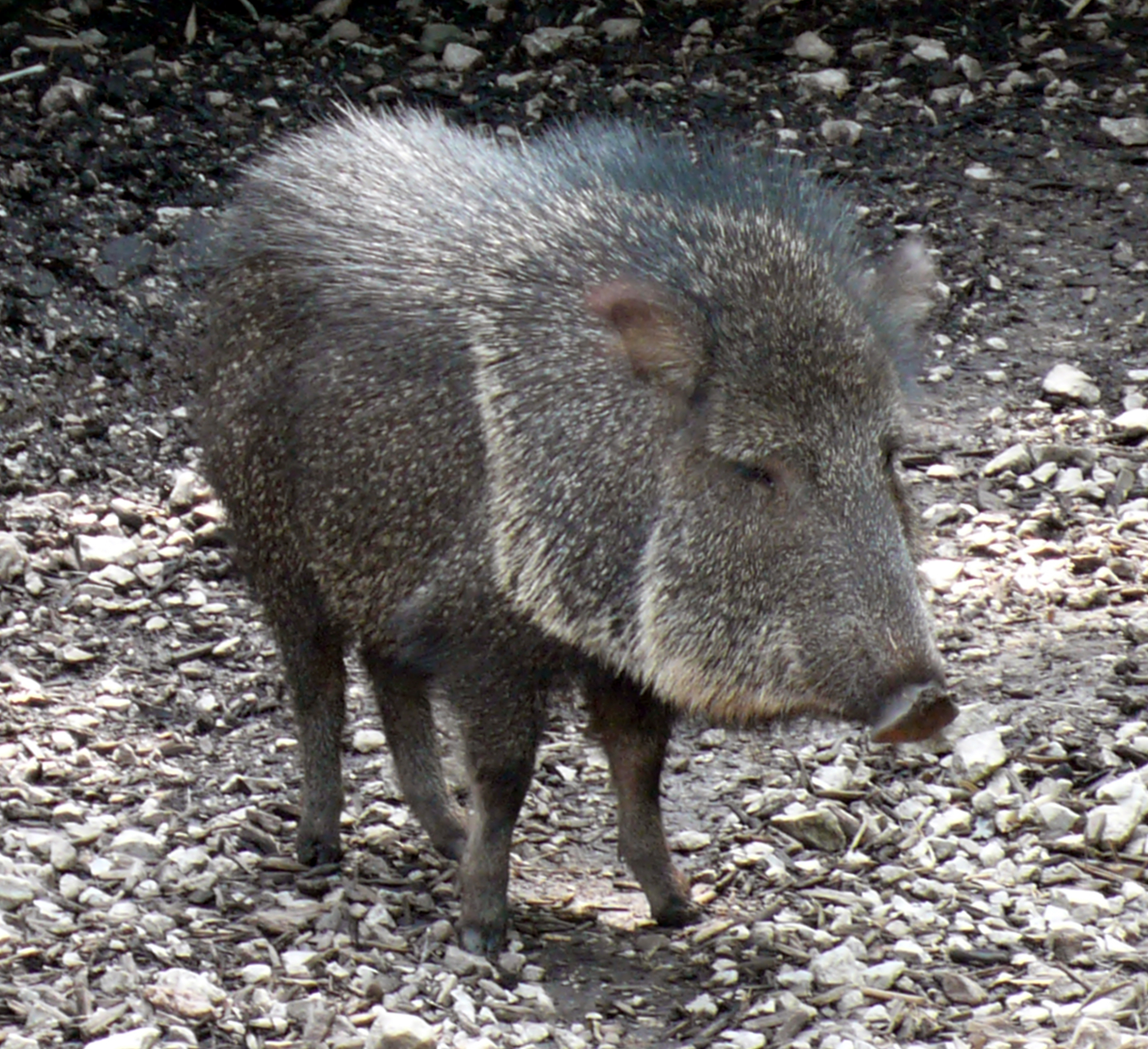
The tagua, or Chaco peccary (Catagonus wagneri), the emblem of the zoo

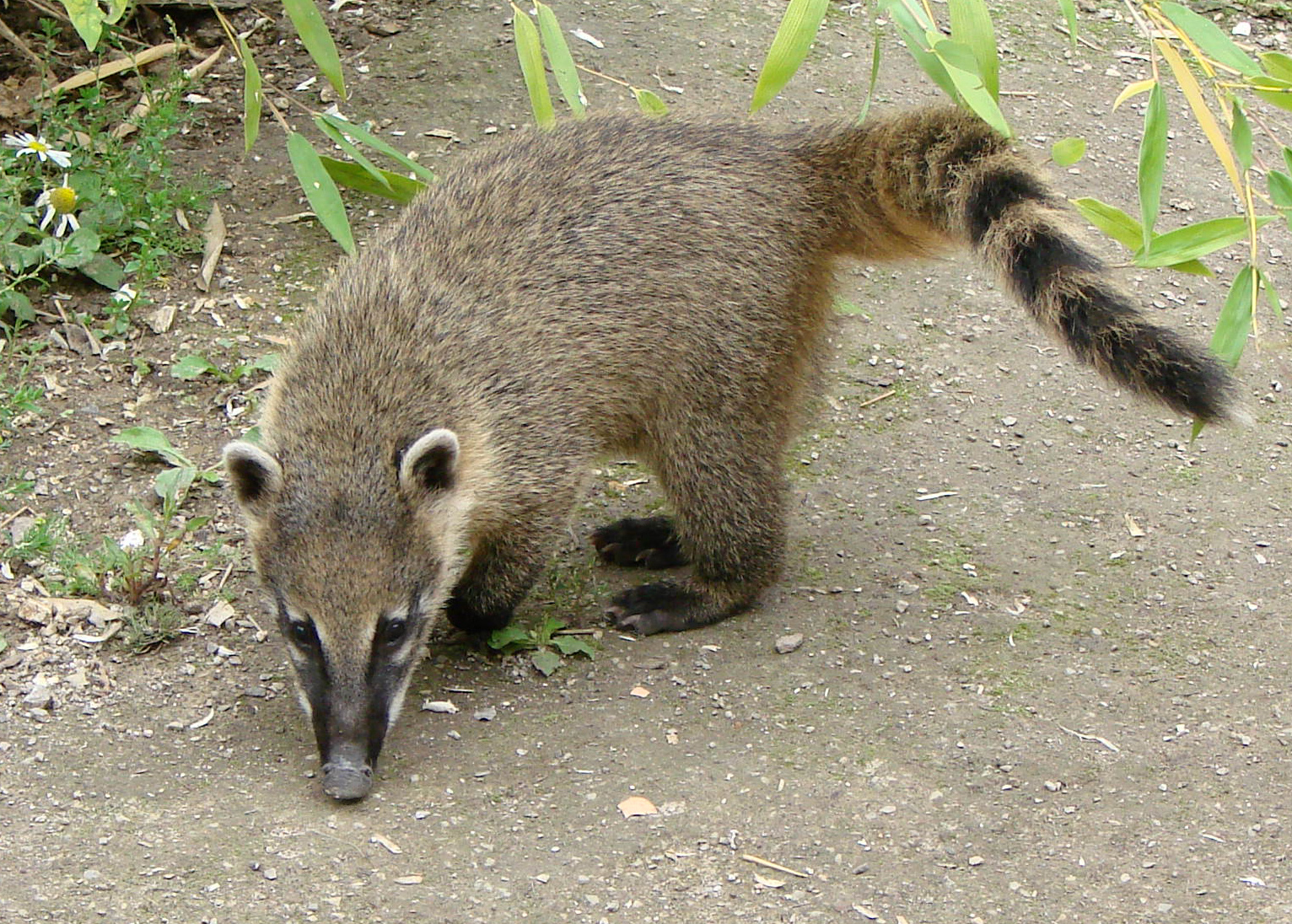
The coati, the most abundant animal in the zoo

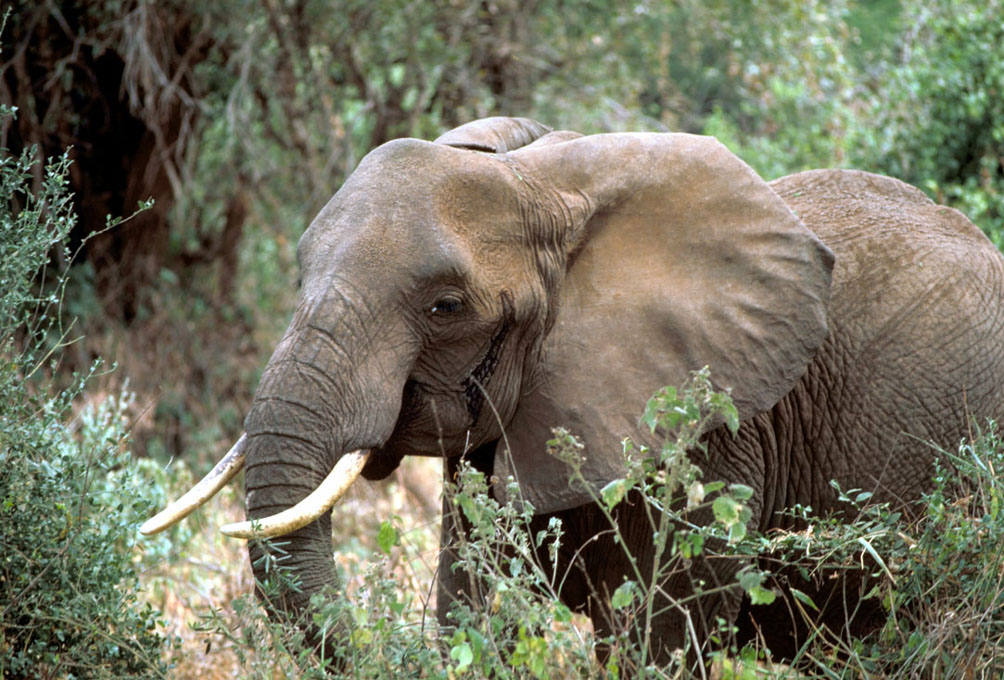
The elephant

Mammals at the zoo include:

- African lion (Panthera leo )
- Bengal tiger (Panthera tigris tigris)
- Jaguar (Panthera onca)
- Puma (Puma concolor)
- Geoffroy's cat (Leopardus geoffroyi )
- Ocelot (Leopardus pardalis)
- Crab-eating fox (Cerdocyon thous)
- Crab-eating raccoon (Procyon cancrivorus)
- Ring-tailed coati (Nasua nasua)
- Tayra (Eira barbara)
- Fallow deer (Dama dama)
- Gray brocket deer (Mazama gouazoubira)
- Domestic goat (Capra aegagrus hircus)
- White-lipped peccary (Tayassu pecari)
- Collared peccary (Tayassu tajacu)
- Tapir (Tapirus terrestris)
- Common hippopotamus (Hippopotamus amphibius)
- African savannah elephant (Loxodonta africana)
- Capybara (Hydrochoerus hydrochaeris)
- Giant anteater (Myrmecophaga tridactyla)
- southern tamandua (Tamandua tetradactyla)
- Common chimpanzee (Pan troglodytes)
- Black-headed spider monkey (Ateles fusciceps)
- Azara's night monkey(Aotus azarae)
- Black howler monkey (Alouatta caraya))
- Azaras's capuchin (Sapajus cay paraguayanus)

==== Birds ====
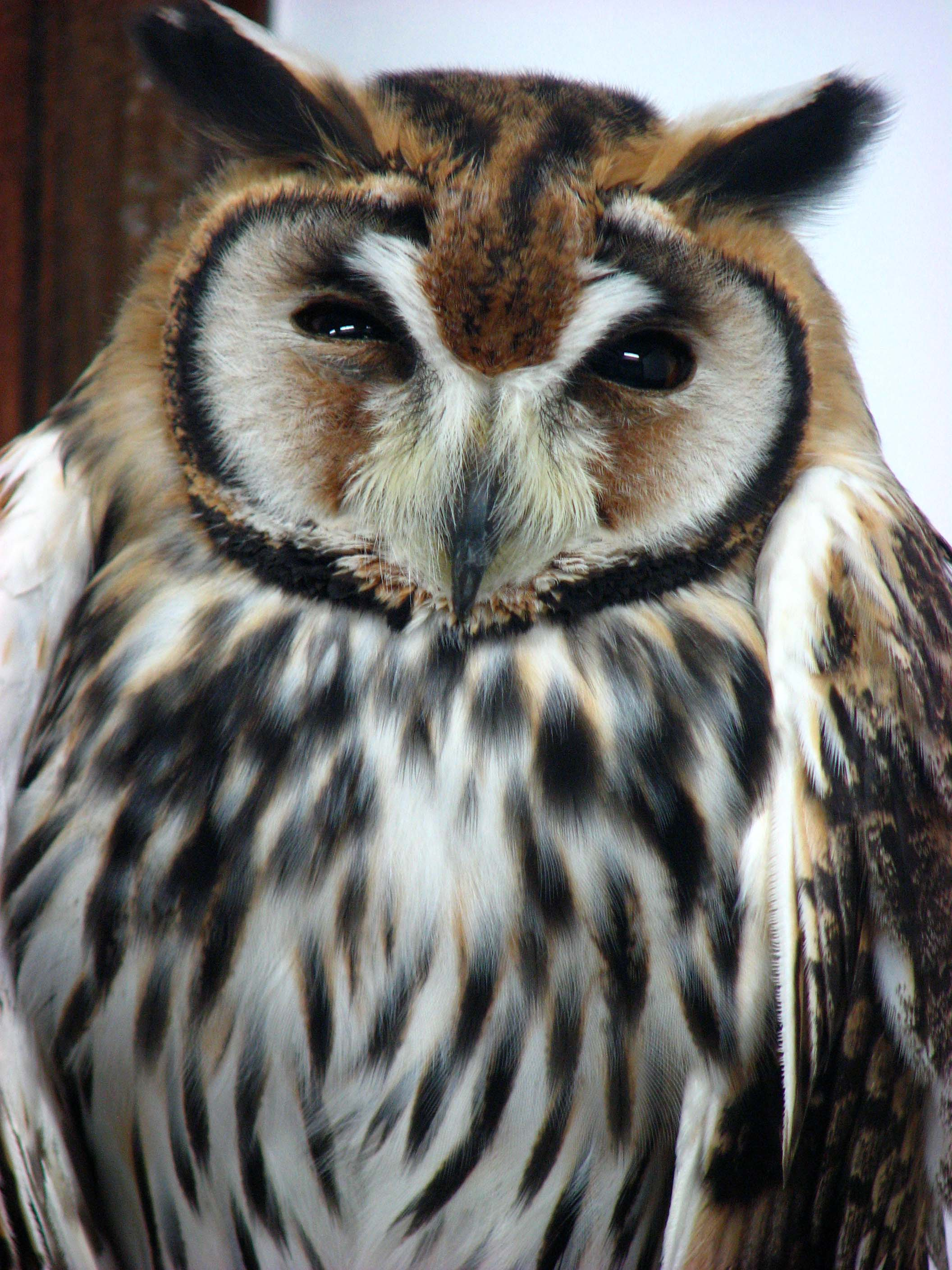
The striped owl (Asio clamator), common in the forests Central and Southern America

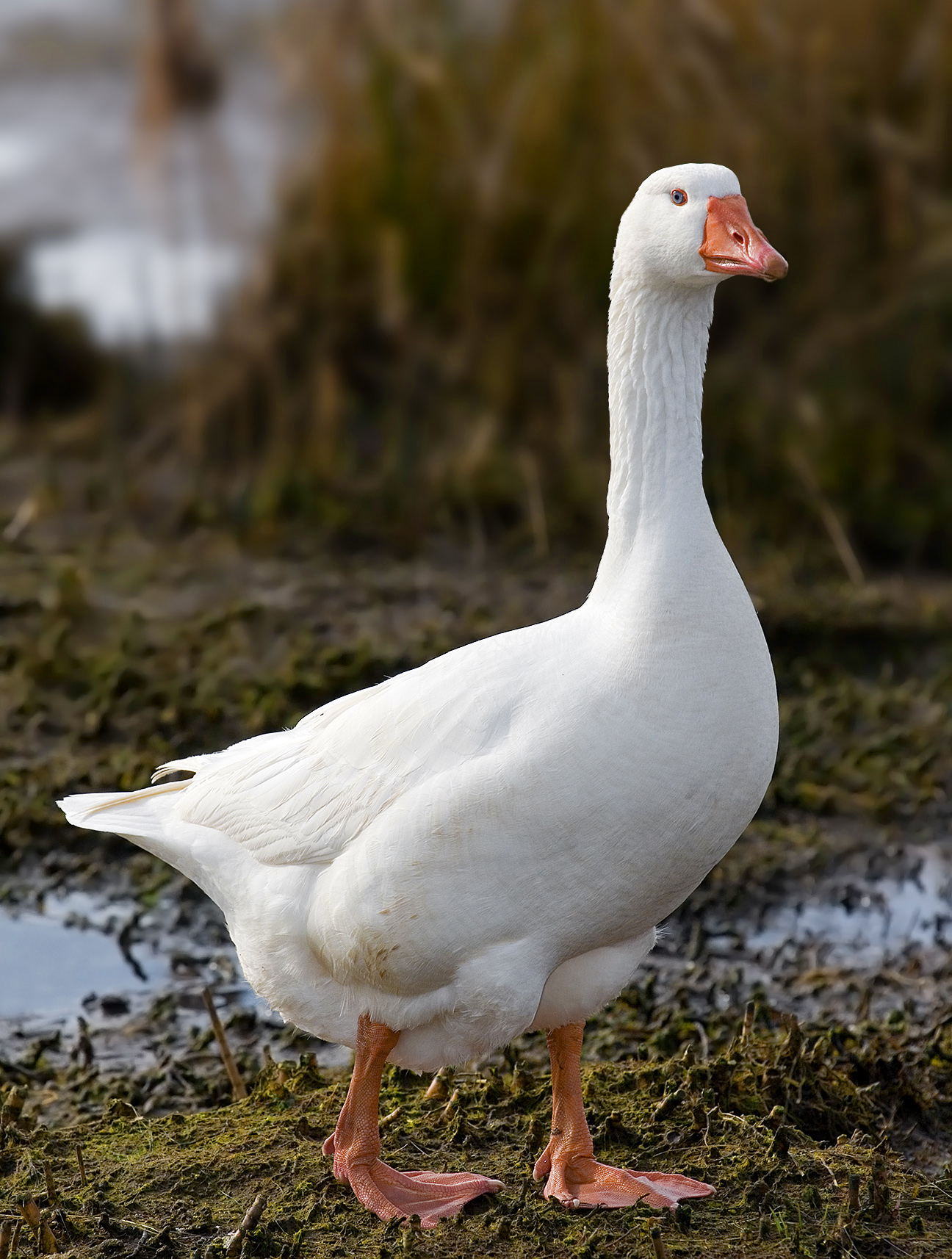
Domestic goose, a very common bird in Paraguayan rural areas

Birds at the zoo include:

- Chaco eagle or Crowned solitary eagle (Harpyhaliaetus coronatus)
- Common rhea (Rhea americana)
- Red-and-green macaw (Ara chloroptera)
- Monk parakeet (Myiopsitta monachus)
- Great horned owl (Bubo virginianus)
- Aplomado falcon (Falco femoralis)
- Jabiru (Jabiru mycteria)
- southern crested caracara (Caracara plancus)
- Southern screamer (Chauna torquata)
- Nanday parakeet (Aratinga nenday)
- black vulture or American black vulture(Coragyps atratus)
- Barn owl (Tyto (sp.))
- Burrowing parrot or Patagonian conure (Cyanoliseus patagonus)
- Blue-fronted amazon (Amazona aestiva)
- Blue-winged macaw (Primolius maracana)
- Vinaceous-breasted amazon (Amazona vinacea)
- Striped owl (Asio clamator)
- Spectacled owl (Pulsatrix perspicillata)
- Toco toucan (Ramphastos toco)
- Blue-and-yellow macaw (Ara ararauna)
- Hyacinth macaw (Anodorhynchus hyacinthinus)
- Ostrich (Struthio camelus)
- Greylag goose (Anser anser)
- Indian peafowl (Pavo cristatus)
- Silver pheasant (Lophura nycthemera)
- Ferruginous pygmy owl (Glaucidium brasilianum)
- Wild turkey (Meleagris gallopavo)
- Helmeted guineafowl (Numida meleagris)
- Red junglefowl (Gallus gallus)
- White-faced whistling duck (Dendrocygna viduata)
- Muscovy duck (Cairina moschata)

==== Reptiles ====
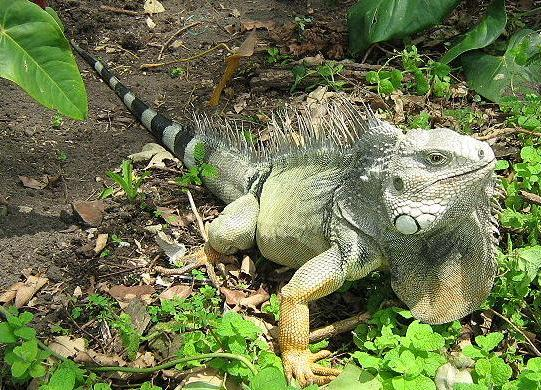
The green iguana, one of the Paraguayan lizards

Reptiles at the zoo include:

- Yellow anaconda (Eunectes notaeus)
- Yacare caiman (Caiman yacare)
- Broad-snouted caiman (Caiman latirostris)
- Green iguana (Iguana iguana)
- Red-eared slider or red-eared terrapin (Trachemys scripta elegans)
- Red-footed tortoise (Geochelone carbonaria)
