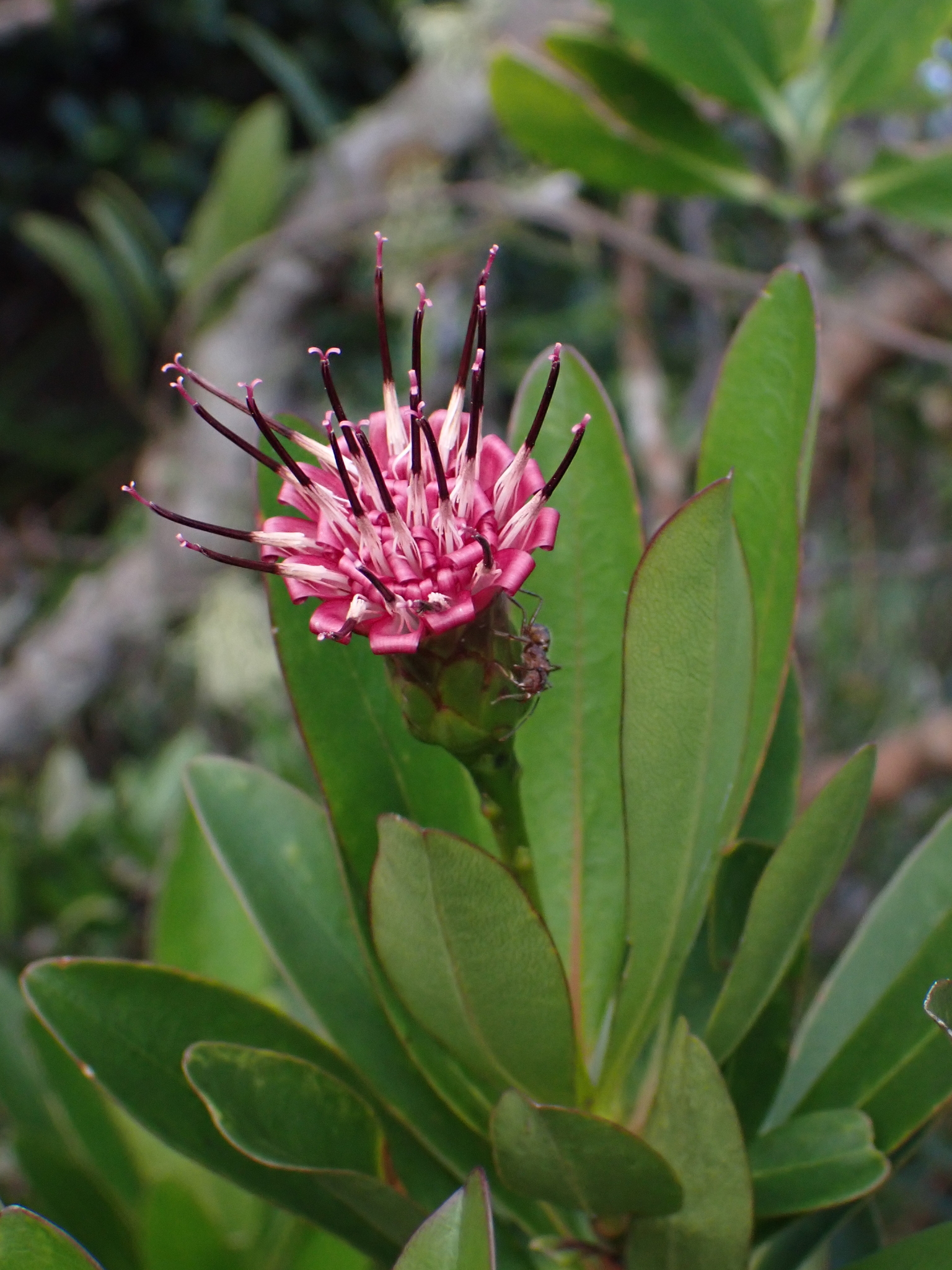
- Gongylolepis oblanceolata in Brazil

Scientific classification
- Kingdom: Plantae
- Clade: Embryophytes
- Clade: Tracheophytes
- Clade: Angiosperms
- Clade: Eudicots
- Clade: Asterids
- Order: Asterales
- Family: Asteraceae
- Subfamily: Stifftioideae
- Tribe: Stifftieae
- Genus: Gongylolepis; R.H.Schomb.

Type species
- Gongylolepis benthamiana R.H.Schomb.

Species
- See text

Synonyms
- Cardonaea Aristeg., Maguire & Steyerm.

= Gongylolepis =

Genus of flowering plants

Gongylolepis ( Gk. gongýlos γογγύλος "round") is a genus of South American flowering plants in the family Asteraceae. The following species are recognised by the Global Compositae Checklist:

- Gongylolepis benthamiana R.H.Schomb.
- Gongylolepis bracteata Maguire
- Gongylolepis colombiana (Cuatrec.) Cuatrec.
- Gongylolepis cortesii (S.Díaz) Pruski & S.Díaz
- Gongylolepis erioclada S.F.Blake
- Gongylolepis fruticosa Maguire, Steyerm. & Wurdack
- Gongylolepis glaberrima S.F.Blake
- Gongylolepis huachamacari Maguire
- Gongylolepis jauaensis (Aristeg., Maguire & Steyerm.) V.M.Badillo
- Gongylolepis martiana (Baker) Steyerm. & Cuatrec.
- Gongylolepis oblanceolata Pruski
- Gongylolepis paniculata Maguire & K.D.Phelps
- Gongylolepis paruana Maguire
- Gongylolepis pedunculata Maguire
- Gongylolepis yapacana Maguire
