= Herrera (surname) =

- Place of origin: Spain

Herrera is a surname of Spanish origin, from the Latin word ferrāria, meaning "iron mine" or "iron works" and also the feminine of Latin ferrārius, "of or pertaining to iron"; or, alternatively, the feminine of Spanish herrero ("ironsmith", from ferrārius), which also gives the surname Herrero. Variants of the name include Errera, Ferrera and the less common Bherrera. Its equivalent in Portuguese and Galician is Ferreira. Also, because of Spanish naming customs, some people are listed here with their family name as their second-to-last name.

== A ==
- Aaron Herrera (born 1990), Mexican boxer
- Abel Ernesto Herrera (born 1955), Argentine footballer
- Abraham Cohen de Herrera or Alonso Nunez de Herrera (c. 1570–c. 1635), European religious philosopher and kabbalist
- Adelardo López de Ayala y Herrera (1828–1879), Spanish writer and politician
- Adolfo Herrera (1940-2013), Venezuelan journalist
- Agustín Enrique Herrera (born 1985), Mexican football player
- Alex Herrera (born 1976), Venezuelan baseball player
- Alfonso Herrera (died 1602), Spanish bishop
- Alfonso Herrera (born 1983), Mexican actor
- Alfonso L. Herrera (1868–1942), Mexican biologist, author and educator
- Alicia Herrera Rivera (1928-2013), Chilean feminist lawyer
- Ameurfina Melencio-Herrera (1922–2020), Filipino judge of the supreme court
- Ander Herrera (born 1989), Spanish football player
- Ángel Herrera Oria (1886–1968), Spanish cardinal
- Ángel Herrera Vera (born 1957), Cuban boxer
- Ángel Maria Herrera (1859–1948), Panamanian educator
- Anthony Herrera (1944–2011), American actor
- Anthony Herrera (American football) (born 1980), American football player
- Estadio Antonio Herrera Gutiérrez (1910-1969), Venezuelan entrepreneur
- Antonio Ibáñez de la Riva Herrera (1633–1710), Spanish bishop
- Armando Herrera (triple jumper) (born 1955), Cuban triple jumper
- Arquímedes Herrera (1935–2013), Venezuelan track and field athlete
- Arsenio Cruz-Herrera (1863–1917), Filipino politician in Manila
- Arturo Herrera (born 1959), Venezuelan visual artist
- Astrid Carolina Herrera (born 1963), Venezuelan beauty pageant contestant and actress

== B ==
- Balbina Herrera (born c. 1955), Panamanian politician
- Bernardino Herrera (born 1977), Spanish field hockey player
- Bernardo Álvarez Herrera (1956–2016), Venezuelan politician and diplomat
- Bobby Herrera (1926–2007), Mexican baseball player
- Brandon Herrera (born 1995), American YouTuber and politician

== C ==
- Carl Herrera (born 1966), Venezuelan basketball player
- Carlos Herrera (1856–1930), Guatemalan politician, president 1920 to 1921
- Carlos Enrique Prado Herrera (born 1978), Cuban artist
- Carlos Leonardo Herrera (born 1983), Argentine boxer
- Carlos María Herrera (1875–1914), Uruguayan painter
- Carlos Salazar Herrera (1906–1982), Costa Rican artist and writer
- Carmen Herrera (1915–2022), Cuban painter
- Carmen Herrera (shooting victim) (died 2009), Belizean tradesman
- Carolina Herrera (born 1939), Venezuelan-born American fashion designer
- Catalina de Jesús Herrera (1717–1795), Ecuadorian prioress, nun, and writer
- Chalía Herrera (1864–1948), Cuban opera singer
- Coral Herrera (born 1977), Spanish and Costa Rican writer
- Cristóbal Martín de Herrera (1831–1878), Spanish politician

== D ==
- Daniel Herrera (baseball) (born 1984), baseball player
- Daniel Herrera (rugby union) (born 1963), Uruguayan rugby union coach
- Daniel Rendón Herrera (born 1966), Colombian drug lord
- Danny Herrera (musician) (born 1969), American drummer for Napalm Death
- Danny Herrera (strongman) (1937–2008), American powerlifter
- Dario Herrera (politician) (born 1973), American politician from Nevada
- Dennis Herrera (born 1962), American politician in San Francisco
- Diego Herrera (born 1969), Ecuadorian footballer
- Dionisio de Herrera (1781–1850), Honduran politician, head of Honduras and of Nicaragua

== E ==
- Eddy Herrera (born 1964), Dominican merengue singer
- Eduardo Herrera (golfer) (born 1965), Colombian golfer
- Eduardo Herrera (footballer, born 1988), Mexican footballer
- Edward Herrera (born 1986), Maltese footballer
- Efraín Herrera (born 1959), Mexican footballer
- Efren Herrera (born 1951), Mexican-born American football kicker
- Eladio Herrera (boxer) (1930–2014), Argentine boxer
- Eladio Herrera (Chilean footballer) (born 1984), Chilean footballer
- Elder Herrera (born 1968), Colombian road cyclist
- Elián Herrera (baseball) (born 1985), Dominican baseball player
- Elián Herrera (model) (born 1991), Venezuelan model and beauty pageant contestant
- Emanuel Herrera (born 1987), Argentine footballer
- Engelver Herrera (born 1973), Guatemalan footballer
- Enrique Olaya Herrera (1880–1937), Colombian politician, president 1930 to 1934
- Eric Herrera (born 1992), Panamanian footballer
- Ernesto Herrera (playwright) (1889–1917), Uruguayan playwright, short story writer and journalist
- Esteban Eduardo González Herrera (born 1982), Chilean footballer
- Esteban José Herrera (born 1981), Argentine footballer

== F ==
- Fernando Herrera (bishop) (died 1518), Italian Roman Catholic bishop
- Fernando Herrera (Mexican footballer) (born 1985), Mexican footballer
- Fernando de Acuña y de Herrera (died 1495), Sicilian politician, Viceroy
- Felipe Herrera (1922–1996), Chilean economist, lawyer and academic
- Fernando de Herrera or El Divino (c. 1534–1597), Spanish poet and man of letters
- Fidel Herrera Beltrán (1949–2025), Mexican politician, governor of the state of Veracruz
- Flavio Herrera (1895–1968), Guatemalan writer and diplomat
- Francisco Herrera Luque (1927–1991), Venezuelan writer, psychiatrist and diplomat
- Francisco Herrera the Elder (1576–1656), Spanish painter
- Francisco Herrera the Younger (1622–1685), Spanish painter and architect
- Franklin Herrera (born 1988), Bolivian footballer
- Freddy Herrera (born 1973), Panamanian baseball player

== G ==
- Gabriel Alonso de Herrera (1470–1539), Spanish author on agriculture
- Genaro Herrera (1861-1941), Peruvian writer
- Georgina Herrera (1936–2021), Cuban writer and poet
- Germán Herrera (born 1983), Argentine footballer
- Gloria de Herrera (1929–1985), American art restorer and collector
- Gonzalo O'Farrill y Herrera (1754–1831), Spanish military and political figure
- Grisel Herrera (born 1971), Cuban basketball player
- Gustavo Herrera (1890–1953), Venezuelan politician

== H ==
- Héctor Herrera (runner) (born 1959), Cuban runner
- Héctor Belo Herrera (1905–after 1924), Uruguayan fencer
- Héctor Herrera (born 1990), Mexican footballer
- Helenio Herrera (1910–1997), Franco-Argentine football player and manager
- Hélmer Herrera (1951–1998), Colombian drug trafficker
- Heriberto Herrera (1926–1996), Paraguayan football player and coach

== I ==
- Ignacio Herrera (born 1987), Chilean footballer
- Inés Herrera (born 1978), Spanish footballer
- Irisberto Herrera (born 1968), Spanish-Cuban chess player
- Iván Herrera (born 2000), Panamanian baseball player
- Iván Herrera (footballer) (born 1985), Chilean footballer

== J ==
- Jaime Lynn Herrera (born 1978), American politician in the state of Washington
- Jarol Herrera (born 1984), Colombian footballer
- Javier Herrera (born 2009), Mexican racing driver
- Jerónimo Tomás Abreu Herrera (1930–2012), bishop of Mao-Monte-Cristi, Dominican Republic
- Jesús Herrera (born 1962), Mexican long-distance runner
- Jesús Herrera Alonso (1938–1962), Spanish footballer
- Jesús Héctor Gallego Herrera (died 1971), Colombian priest who was kidnapped and killed
- Jhoel Herrera (born 1980), Peruvian footballer
- Joaquín Herrera (1784-1868), Venezuelan military and politician, president of Carabobo from 1846 to 1854
- Joaquín Ramón Herrera (born 1969), American writer, illustrator, photographer and musician
- John Herrera (gridiron football), American football executive
- John J. Herrera (1910–1986), American attorney and civil-rights activist
- Johnny Herrera (born 1966), American racing driver
- Johnny Herrera (goalkeeper) (born 1981), Chilean footballer
- Jonathan Herrera (baseball) (born 1984), Venezuelan baseball player
- Jorge Herrera (swimmer) (born 1972), Puerto Rican freestyle swimmer
- Jorge Herrera (footballer) (born 1980), Colombian footballer
- José Herrera Uslar (1906–1992), descendent of the founders of the Valley of Caracas and owners of the Hacienda la Vega
- José Herrera (1960s outfielder) (1942–2009), Venezuelan baseball player
- José Herrera (1990s outfielder) (born 1972), Dominican baseball player
- José Antonio Collado Herrera (born 1990), Spanish footballer
- José Cañas Ruiz-Herrera (born 1987), Spanish footballer
- José Carlos Herrera (born 1986), Mexican sprinter
- José Cruz Herrera (1890–1972), Spanish painter
- José Joaquín de Herrera (1792–1854), Mexican politician, president nonconsecutively 1844 to 1851
- José Herrera (born 1965), Uruguayan footballer
- José de la Paz Herrera (1940–2021), Honduran footballer and coach
- Juan Herrera (boxer) (born 1958), Mexican boxer
- Juan de Herrera (1530–1597), Spanish architect, mathematician and geometrician
- Juan Felipe Herrera (born 1948), American writer, cartoonist, teacher, and activist
- Juan Francisco Rodríguez Herrera or Juanito (born 1965), Spanish footballer
- José Herrera (catcher) (born 1987), Venezuelan baseball player
- Juan Moreno y Herrera-Jiménez or Jean Reno (born 1948), French actor of Spanish origin
- Juan Vicente Herrera Campo (born 1956), Spanish politician, president of the community of Castile and León
- Judith C. Herrera (born 1954), American judge
- Judy Herrera American actress
- Julio Martin Herrera Velutini (born 1971), Venezuelan billionaire businessman and founder of Britannia Financial Group
- Julio Herrera (cyclist) (born 1980), Venezuelan track and road cyclist
- Julio Herrera (politician) (born 1956), Peruvian politician from Lima
- Julio César Herrera (born 1977), Cuban track cyclist
- Julius Caesar Herrera (born 1953), Filipino lawyer and politician

== K ==
- Kelvin Herrera (born 1989), Dominican baseball player
- Kristin Herrera (born 1989), American actress

== L ==
- León Herrera Esteban (1922–2003), Spanish military officer and politician
- Leticia Herrera Sánchez (born 1949), Nicaraguan lawyer, guerrilla leader, and politician
- Lola Herrera (born 1935), Spanish actress
- Lorena Herrera (born 1967), Mexican actress
- Lorenzo Herrera (1896–1960), Venezuelan singer and composer
- Luis Herrera (cyclist) (born 1961), Colombian road cyclist
- Luis Herrera (tennis) (born 1971), Mexican tennis player
- Luis Herrera Campins (1925–2007), president of Venezuela
- Luis Alberto de Herrera (1873–1959), Uruguayan lawyer, diplomat, journalist and politician
- Luis Beder Herrera (born 1951), Argentine politician, governor of La Rioja Province
- Luis Bayón Herrera (1889–1956), Spanish film director and screenwriter
- Luis Fernando Herrera (born 1962), Colombian footballer
- Luz María Umpierre-Herrera (born 1947), Puerto Rican poet, scholar, educator and advocate

== M ==
- M. Miriam Herrera (born 1963), American author and poet
- Magos Herrera (born 1970), Mexican jazz singer
- Manuel C. Herrera (c. 1924–1998), Filipino politician
- Marcelo Herrera (footballer, born 1966) (born 1966), Argentine football player
- Marcelo Herrera (footballer, born 1992) (born 1992), Argentine football player
- María Herrera Magdaleno, Mexican businesswoman and human rights activist
- María Teresa Herrera (born 1956), Mexican politician and judge
- Martín Herrera (born 1970), Argentine footballer
- Mary Herrera (born 1959), American politician in New Mexico
- Matti Herrera Bower, Cuban-born American politician in Florida
- Mauricio Herrera (born 1980), Mexican-American boxer
- Maya Herrera fictional character in the TV drama Heroes
- Mayra Herrera (born 1988), Guatemalan race walker
- Michael Herrera (born 1985), Cuban track and field athlete
- Miguel Herrera (born 1968), Mexican football coach
- Miguel Ángel Chico Herrera (born 1961), Mexican politician
- Mike Herrera (baseball) (1897–1978), Cuban baseball player
- Mike Herrera (musician) (born 1976), American vocalist and bass guitarist for MxPx and Tumbledown
- Mirta Cerra Herrera (1904–1986), Cuban painter

== N ==
- Nadege Herrera (born 1986), Panamanian model and beauty pageant contestant
- Nancy Cooke de Herrera (1922–2013), American socialite, fashion expert and author
- Nancy Fabiola Herrera, Venezuelan opera singer
- Napoleón Nassar Herrera, Honduran politician and military officer
- Néstor Herrera Heredia (1933–2026), Ecuadorian Roman Catholic bishop
- Nicolás Gregorio Herrera, (1774–1833), Uruguayan lawyer
- Nicolás Herrera (born 1983), Argentine footballer
- Nicholas Herrera (born 1964), American nuevomexicano painter and sculptor

== O ==
- Odúbel Herrera (born 1991), Venezuelan baseball player
- Omar Torrijos Herrera (1929–1981), Panamanian de facto leader 1968 to 1981

== P ==
- Pablo Herrera (beach volleyball) (born 1982), Spanish beach volleyball player
- Pablo Herrera (musician), Cuban hip hop music producer
- Paco Herrera (born 1953), Spanish footballer and manager
- Paloma Herrera (born 1975), Argentine ballet dancer
- Pancho Herrera (1934–2005), Cuban baseball player
- Patricia Vega Herrera (born 1963), Costa Rican lawyer and politician
- Pedro de Herrera (15th century), Spanish Jewish leader
- Pepe Herrera (born 1987), Filipino actor

== R ==
- Rafael Herrera (born 1945), Mexican boxer
- Rafaela Herrera (1742–1805), a national heroine of Nicaragua
- Ram Herrera, Tejano musician
- Raymond Herrera (born 1972), American drummer for Arkaea, Fear Factory and Brujeria
- Reinaldo Herrera (1933–2025), Venezuelan-American socialite and journalist
- René Herrera, Texan singer, half of René y René
- Rene Herrera (athlete) (born 1979), Filipino track and field athlete
- Rich Herrera, American sports radio personality
- Robbie Herrera (born 1970), English footballer
- Robert Herrera (born 1989), Uruguayan footballer
- Roberto Herrera, Argentine choreographer and dancer
- Roberto Díaz Herrera (born 1937), Panamanian military officer and exile
- Ronald Gamarra Herrera, Peruvian politician
- Ronald Herrera (born 1995), Venezuelan baseball player

== S ==
- Santos León Herrera (1874–1950), Costa Rican politician, president 1948
- Saúl González Herrera (1915–2006), Mexican politician
- Sergio Herrera (born 1981), Colombian footballer
- Silvestre S. Herrera (1917–2007), Mexican-American recipient of the Medal of Honor
- Simón de Herrera (1754–1813), governor of Nuevo León, New Spain, & interim governor of Spanish Texas

== T ==
- Teresa Tanco Cordovez de Herrera (1859–1946), Colombian pianist and composer
- Tomás de Herrera (1804–1854), president of the Republic of the New Granada
- Tommy Herrera (1933–1997), American baseball player and manager

== V ==
- Velino Herrera or Ma Pe Wi (1902–1973), Pueblo Indian painter
- Vicente Herrera Zeledón (1821–1888), Costa Rican politician, president 1876 to 1877
- Víctor Herrera (born 1970), Colombian track and road cyclist
- Victor Larco Herrera (1870–1939), Peruvian politician
- Victor Manuel Velasco Herrera, Mexican physicist

== W ==
- Wladimir Herrera (born 1981), Chilean footballer

== X ==
- Ximena Herrera (born 1979), Bolivian-born Mexican actress

== Y ==
- Yangel Herrera (born 1998), Venezuelan football player
- Yender Herrera (born 1991), Venezuelan football player
- Yoslan Herrera (born 1981), Cuban baseball player
- Yusleinis Herrera (born 1984), Cuban volleyball player

== See also ==
- Herrera (disambiguation)
- Herrero (surname), the masculine form of Herrera
- Ferreira (surname), a related Portuguese surname
- Laferrière (surname), a related French surname
