= Herrero =

Herrero is a Spanish-language occupational surname literally meaning "blacksmith". The feminine form is Herrera. People with this surname include:

- Abel Herrero (born 1971), Cuban artist
- Abel Herrero (born 1969), Texas politician
- Alfonso Herrero (born 1994), Spanish footballer
- Alicia Herrero Liñana (born 1998), Spanish tennis player
- Álvaro Peña Herrero (born 1991), Spanish footballer
- André Herrero (1938–2025), French rugby union player
- Ángel Herrero (footballer, born 1942), Spanish footballer
- Ángel Herrero (footballer, born 1949), Spanish footballer
- Antonia Herrero (1897–1978), Argentine actress
- Bernard Herrero (born 1957), French rugby union player
- Bruno Herrero Arias (born 1985), Spanish footballer, known mononymusly as Bruno
- Carla Herrero (born 1994), also known by the pseudonym Silay Alkma, Spanish writer, lecturer, and activist
- Carlos Ruiz Herrero (born 1948), Spanish footballer
- Constanza Herrero (born 1991), Australian-Chilean singer, songwriter, and actress
- Chus Herrero (born 1984), Spanish footballer
- Daniel Herrero (born 1948), French rugby union player and coach
- Daniela Herrero (born1985) Argentine singer, songwriter and actress
- David Herrero (born 1979), Spanish cyclist
- Elisa Herrero Uceda (born 1957), Spanish writer, sister of Miguel Herrero Uceda
- Eliseo Herrero, Argentine actor
- Enrique Herrero (footballer, born 1959), Spanish footballer
- Enrique Herrero (footballer, born 2005), Spanish footballer
- Fanny Herrero (born 1974), French television screenwriter, daughter of Daniel Herrero
- Felipe Herrero (born 1970), Spanish footballer
- Gerardo Herrero (born 1953), Spanish filmmaker
- Gonzalo Herrero (born 1989), Spanish footballer
- Hortensia Herrero (born 1950) Spanish businesswoman
- Jesús Herrero (born 1986), Spanish futsal player
- Jesús María Herrero (born 1984), Spanish footballer
- Jorge Herrero (born 1983), Spanish footballer
- José Alberto Herrero (born 1978), Spanish politician
- José María Maravall Herrero (born 1942), Spanish academic and politician
- José Ramón Herrero Merediz (1931–2016), Spanish politician
- Liliana Herrero (born 1948), Argentine musician
- Luis Herrero-Tejedor Algar (born 1955), Spanish politician
- Manolo Herrero (footballer, born 1967), Spanish footballer and manager
- Manolo Herrero (footballer, born 1970), Spanish footballer and manager
- Manuel Herrero Fernández (born 1947), Bishop of Palencia, Spain
- Manuel Herrero Maestre (born 1967), Spanish footballer and coach
- María Antonia Herrero (born 1978), Spanish researcher and chemist
- Miguel Herrero Uceda (born 1964), Spanish writer, lecturer and natural scientist, brother of Elisa Herrero Uceda
- Miguel Alfonso Herrero (born 1988), Spanish footballer
- Nieves Herrero (born 1957), Spanish journalist, presenter, and writer
- Oscar Herrero (born 1959), Spanish Flamenco guitarist
- Oscar Herrero (1921–1999), nicknamed Cacho, Argentine tango arranger, composer, and violinist
- Pablo Herrero (1942–2023), Spanish musician and composer
- Pedro Herrero Rubio (1904–1978), Spanish pediatrician, titled as Servant of God by the Catholic church
- Rodolfo Herrero (fl. 1910–1920), Mexican military officer
- Santiago Herrero (1943–1970), Spanish motorcycle racer
- Santiago Herrero Amor (born 1971), Spanish futsal player
- Sheila Herrero Lapuente (born 1976), Spanish inline speed skater
- Stephen Herrero, Canadian doctor of animal behaviour and ecology
- Subas Herrero (1943–2013), Spanish Filipino actor and singer
- Yayo Herrero (born 1965), Spanish anthropologist, engineer, professor and ecofeminist activist
