= Herrera =

Herrera may refer to:

== People ==
- Herrera (surname)

== Places ==
- Herrera, Entre Ríos, a village and municipality in Argentina
- Herrera, Santiago del Estero, a village and municipality in Argentina
- Enrique Olaya Herrera Airport, an airport in Medellín, Colombia
- Herrera International Airport, a closed airport in Santo Domingo, Dominican Republic
- Los Herrera, a municipality in Nuevo León, Mexico
- Herrera Province, a province in Panama
- Herrera (corregimiento), Panama
- Herrera (Asunción), a barrio of Asunción, Paraguay
- La Herrera, a municipality in Castile-La Mancha, Spain
- Herrera de Pisuerga, a municipality in Palencia, Spain
- Herrera, Seville, a municipality in Andalusia, Spain
- Herrera (Santurce), a sector of Santurce in San Juan, Puerto Rico, United States
- Río Herrera, a river in Puerto Rico, United States
- Los Herreras, a municipality in Durango, Mexico

== Other ==
- Herrera (cicada), a genus

== See also ==
- Herrerian, an architectural style named after Juan de Herrera
