= Manolo Herrero =

Manolo Herrero may refer to:

- Manolo Herrero (footballer, born 1970), Spanish football manager and former midfielder
- Manolo Herrero (footballer, born 1967), Spanish football manager and former midfielder
