= Herrema =

Herrema is a Dutch surname. Notable people with the surname include:

- Jennifer Herrema (born 1972), American singer, songwriter, and record producer
- Dr Tiede Herrema (1921–2020), Dutch businessman, victim of abduction in Ireland in 1975

== See also ==
- Herrera (surname)
