= Manuel Velasco =

Manuel Velasco may refer to:

- Manuel Velasco Coello (b. 1980), Mexican politician, Governor of Chiapas from 2012 to 2018
- Manuel Velasco Suárez (1914–2001), Mexican neurologist and Governor of Chiapas from 1970 to 1976
- Manuel de Velasco y Tejada, Spanish admiral during the Battle of Vigo Bay (1702)
- Victor Manuel Velasco Herrera, Mexican theoretical physicist
