= Pedro Herrera =

Pedro Herrera may refer to:

- Pedro de Herrera (fl. 15th century), Spanish politician
- Pedro Herrera Camarero (1909-1969), Spanish anarcho-syndicalist
- Pedro Herrera (footballer) (born 1959), Spanish footballer
- Chingo Bling, Pedro Herrera III (born 1979), American rapper
- Pedro Herrera (cyclist) (born 1986), Colombian cyclist
