= Bernardo Álvarez Herrera =

Venezuelan diplomat (1956–2016)

Bernardo Álvarez Herrera (Note: In this name that follows Hispanic American naming customs, the first or paternal surname is Álvarez and the second or maternal family name is Herrera.) (18 August 1956 – 25 November 2016) was Venezuela's ambassador to the United States from 2003 to 2010 (with an interruption from mid-2008 to mid-2009, when Venezuela withdrew its ambassador) and deputy minister of foreign relations.

Born in Carora, Lara State, Álvarez Herrera held a degree in political science from the Universidad Central de Venezuela and a master's degree in development studies from the University of Sussex in England. Beginning in 1982, he served as a professor at the Universidad Central's School of Political and Administrative Studies. His other previous positions included; deputy minister of hydrocarbons (2000–03) and director-general of hydrocarbons (1999–2000) at the Ministry of Energy and Mines. From 1994 to 1999 he was a member of the Chamber of Deputies.

In September 2008, Herrera was expelled from the United States after Venezuelan President Hugo Chávez accused his American counterpart of conspiring to overthrow his regime and ordered him to leave the country. He was restored to his post after the Venezuelan and US governments agreed to re-establish diplomatic relations.

In December 2010, the U.S. government again expelled Álvarez in response to President Hugo Chávez's refusal to accept President Obama's nomination of Larry Palmer.

He also served as Venezuela's ambassador to Spain from 2011 to 2013. In fall of 2013, he was appointed secretary general of ALBA, the Bolivarian Alliance for the Americas.

On 2 October 2015. Álvarez was designated Ambassador Permanent Representative of Venezuela to the Organization of American States (OAS).

On 13 May 2016, without leaving his ambassadorship post, Álvarez was designated Acting Deputy Minister for North America.

He died of a heart attack on 25 November 2016 in Caracas. He was married and had three children.

Diplomatic posts
Preceded by Luis Herrera Marcano (Chargé d'affaires)	Venezuelan Ambassador to the United States of America; 2003–2010	Succeeded by
Preceded by Roy Chaderton	Ambassador Permanent Representative of Venezuela to the OAS; 2015–2016	Succeeded by Samuel Moncada
