= Teresa Tanco Cordovez de Herrera =

Colombian pianist and composer

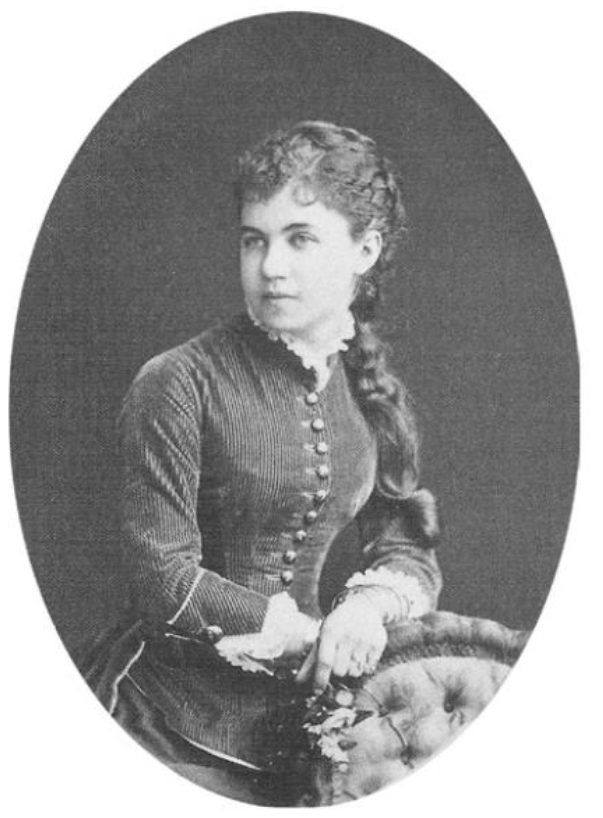
- Born: 1859
- Died: 1946; Bogotá, Colombia
- Occupation(s): Pianist, composer

Teresa Tanco Cordovez de Herrera (1859 – 1946) was a Colombian pianist and composer. She traveled to Europe with her sister in 1882 and made her Paris debut at Salle Pleyel Saint-Saens to favorable reviews. She composed for voice, sacred pieces and a zarzuela Simila similibus. She died in Bogotá.
