= Jorge Herrero =

Spanish footballer (born 1983)

Personal information
- Full name: Jorge Herrero Arias
- Date of birth: 18 June 1983 (age 43)
- Place of birth: Jerez de la Frontera, Spain
- Height: 1.78 m (5 ft 10 in)
- Position: Midfielder

Youth career
- 1999–2002: Xerez

Senior career*
Years	Team	Apps	(Gls)
2002–2004	Xerez B		
2003–2004	Xerez	6	(0)
2004–2008	Portuense	88	(5)
2008–2009	Linense	33	(0)
2009–2010	Jerez Industrial	15	(0)
2010–2011	Villanovense	50	(6)
2011–2013	Sanluqueño	61	(12)
2013–2017	San Fernando	122	(18)
2017–2019	Xerez Deportivo	64	(7)
2019–2020	Los Barrios	12	(1)
2020–2021	Rota	29	(3)
- * Club domestic league appearances and goals

Jorge Herrero Arias (born 18 June 1983) is a Spanish former footballer who played as a midfielder.

== Club career ==
Born in Jerez de la Frontera, Province of Cádiz, Andalusia, Herrero finished his youth career with local Xerez CD, and made his senior debut with the reserves in 2002. On 13 September 2003 he appeared in his first game as a professional, starting in a 1–1 away draw against Elche CF in the Segunda División; he finished the season with seven first-team appearances, being subsequently released.

Subsequently, Herrero resumed his career in the Segunda División B and Tercera División, representing Racing Club Portuense, Real Balompédica Linense, Jerez Industrial CF, CF Villanovense, Atlético Sanluqueño CF, San Fernando CD, Xerez Deportivo FC, UD Los Barrios and CD Rota.

== Personal life ==
Herrero's younger brother, Bruno, was also a footballer and a midfielder. He too represented Xerez and San Fernando.
