= Herrera (Santurce) =

Subbarrio of Santurce in San Juan, Puerto Rico

Coordinates: 18°26′30″N 66°03′00″W

- Subbarrio
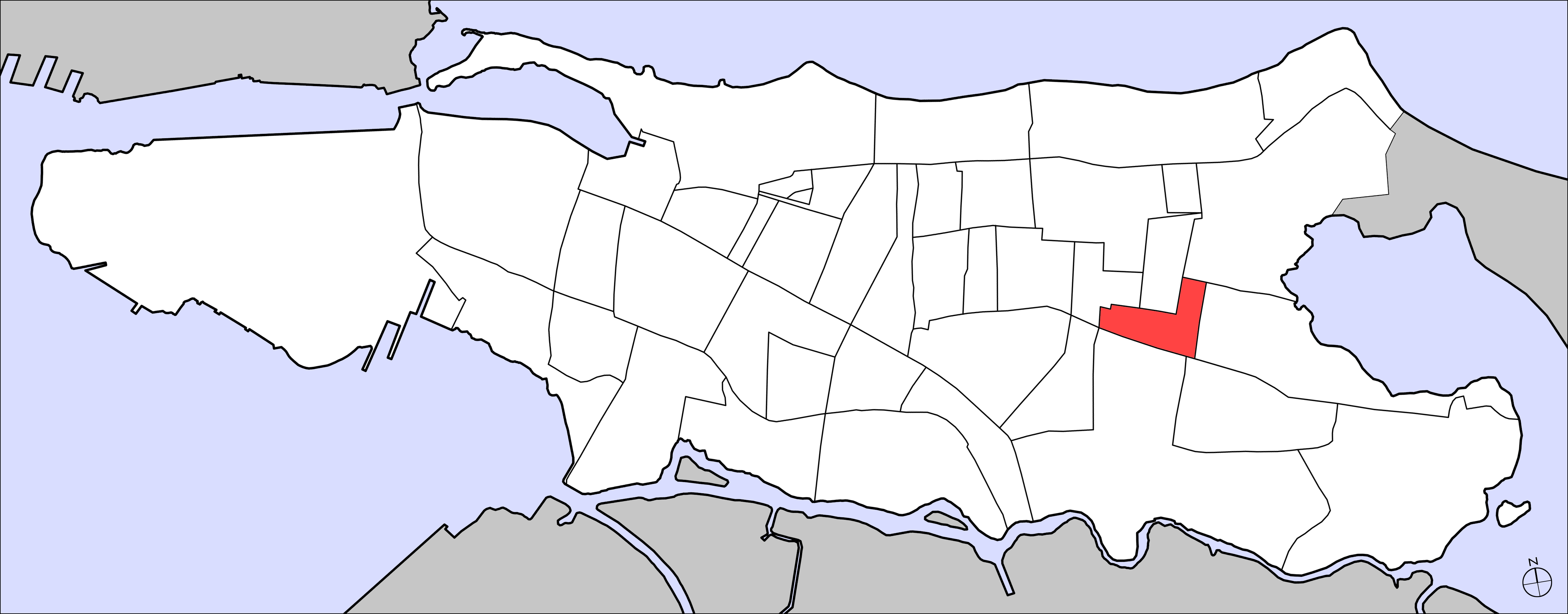
- Commonwealth: Puerto Rico
- Municipality: San Juan
- Barrio: Santurce

Area
  - Total: .05 sq mi (0.13 km^{2})
  - Land: .05 sq mi (0.13 km^{2})
- Elevation: 20 ft (6.1 m)

Population (2010)
  - Total: 1,600
  - Density: 32,000/sq mi (12,000/km^{2})
- Source: 2010 Census
- Time zone: UTC−4 (AST)

Herrera is one of the forty subbarrios of Santurce, San Juan, Puerto Rico.

== Demographics ==
In 1940, Herrera had a population of 3,110.

In 2000, Herrera had a population of 1,841.

In 2010, Herrera had a population of 1,600 and a population density of 32,000 persons per square mile.

== See also ==
- List of communities in Puerto Rico
