= María Herrera Magdaleno =

Mexican businesswoman and human rights activist

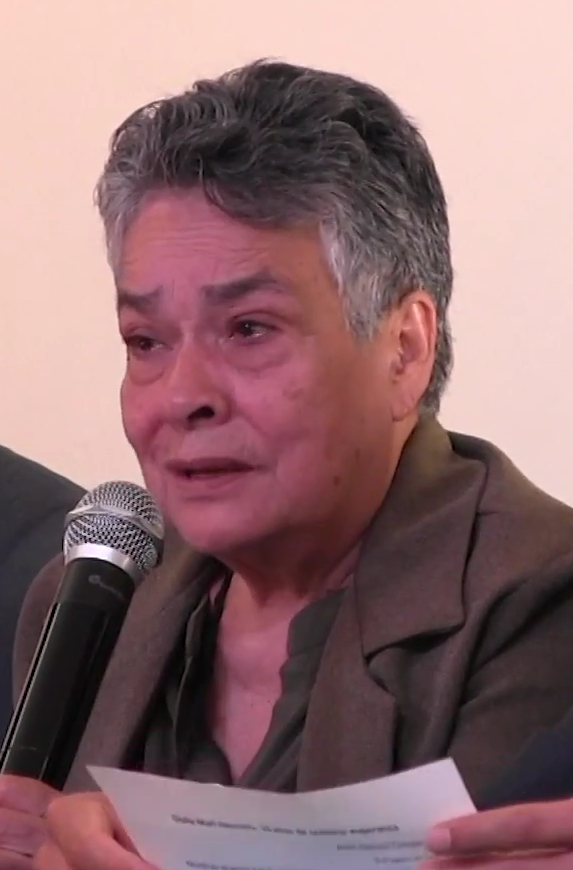
- Herrera in 2018
- Born: Michoacán, Mexico
- Other names: Doña Mary
- Occupation: Human rights activist
- Children: 8

María Herrera Magdaleno, also known as Doña Mary, is a Mexican businesswoman and human rights activist. In 2014, she founded a national network of local collectives to educate families on how to investigate disappearances after four of her eight children went missing. The network now includes almost 200 groups spread across 26 of Mexico's states.

== Life ==
Herrera is from Michoacán and is the mother of eight children and grandmother of two stepchildren. She was born c. 1949. By 2008, she had founded a business after leaving a husband whom she suspected had been unfaithful. Herrera made clothes and sold gold jewelry, at first in her home state of Michoacán. Her business later expanded to Guadalajara.

In 2008, Herrera's sons, Raúl (19) and Jesús Salvador (24) took a trip with five colleagues to Guerrero, near Atoyac de Álvarez. Her sons and their colleagues never returned.

Two years later, her sons Gustavo (28) and Luís Armando (24) vanished during a work trip in eastern Veracruz. She suspects her sons disappeared as a result of drug cartel violence.

In 2014, Herrera founded a national network of local collectives to educate families on how to investigate disappearances. She also plans conferences and gives workshops in universities on this same topic.

In May 2022, Herrera met with Pope Francis. In November 2022, Herrera sued the Mexican State in the Inter-American Court of Human Rights in Washington, for its failure to investigate her sons' disappearance . In April 2023, she was included on the Time 100 list of the most influential people in the world for her activism.
