= Gonzalo Herrero =

Spanish footballer

Personal information
- Full name: Gonzalo Herrero Agüeros
- Date of birth: 5 October 1989 (age 37)
- Place of birth: Santander, Spain
- Height: 1.76 m (5 ft 9 in)
- Position: Right back

Youth career
- SD Amistad
- 2005–2008: Racing Santander

Senior career*
Years	Team	Apps	(Gls)
2007–2012	Racing B	132	(17)
2012–2014	Racing Santander	2	(0)
2013–2014	→ Tropezón (loan)	18	(1)
- * Club domestic league appearances and goals as of 12 May 2014

Gonzalo Herrero Agüeros (born 5 October 1989) is a Spanish footballer who plays as a right back.

== Club career ==
Gonzalo was born in Santander, Cantabria. A product of local giants Racing de Santander's youth system, he made his debuts as a senior in the 2007–08 campaign, winning promotion from Tercera División.

Gonzalo made his first team debut on 13 December 2011, starting in a 3–2 home win against Rayo Vallecano, for the season's Copa del Rey. In July 2012, after the club's relegation from La Liga, he was promoted to the main squad and signed a three-year contract.

On 13 October 2012 Gonzalo made his league debut, replacing Francis in the 65th minute of a 1–1 away draw against Xerez CD in the Segunda División championship. On 5 September of the following year he was loaned to Segunda División B's CD Tropezón, in a season-long deal.

In February 2014, in a match against UD Logroñés, Gonzalo suffered a severe knee injury, being sidelined for the remainder of the season. In June, he was released by Racing.
