= Bruno Herrero =

Spanish footballer

Bruno
Personal information
- Full name: Bruno Herrero Arias
- Date of birth: 13 February 1985 (age 41)
- Place of birth: Jerez de la Frontera, Spain
- Height: 1.76 m (5 ft 9 in)
- Position: Midfielder

Youth career
- Sevilla

Senior career*
Years	Team	Apps	(Gls)
2004–2007	Sevilla B	64	(6)
2006–2007	Sevilla	3	(0)
2007–2010	Murcia	85	(13)
2008	→ Salamanca (loan)	17	(0)
2010–2013	Xerez	75	(0)
2013	Buriram United	11	(1)
2014	Girona	1	(0)
2014	Delhi Dynamos	10	(1)
2015	NorthEast United	12	(1)
2016	Atlético Baleares	7	(0)
2016	Pune City	3	(0)
2017–2020	San Fernando	78	(3)
2020–2021	Xerez Deportivo	22	(1)

International career
2003	Spain U18	3	(0)
- * Club domestic league appearances and goals as of 06:17, 30 May 2022 (UTC)

Bruno Herrero Arias (born 13 February 1985), known simply as Bruno, is a Spanish former professional footballer who played as a midfielder.

== Club career ==
Bruno was born in Jerez de la Frontera, Province of Cádiz. A product of Sevilla FC's youth system, he could never break into the first team, only making three La Liga appearances over two seasons, the first on 30 April 2006 as he played the last minute of a 2–1 away win against Real Sociedad.

In January 2007, Bruno was waived and joined Real Murcia in the Segunda División, playing nine games as the club returned to the top flight. However, as opportunities were rare in the following campaign, he moved again in January of the next year, being loaned to UD Salamanca.

Bruno had a breakthrough year in 2008–09, scoring ten league goals for the Pimentoneros for a final mid-table position. In the following season he played roughly the same matches and minutes, but netted seven goals less and also suffered relegation, signing for Xerez CD also of the second tier in early July 2010.

In the following years, Bruno rarely settled with a club, representing Buriram United FC, Girona FC and Delhi Dynamos FC. On 7 July 2015, he joined North East United FC from the Indian Super League.

Bruno returned to Spain in January 2016, signing for division three team CD Atlético Baleares.

== Personal life ==
Herrero's older brother, Jorge, was also a footballer and a midfielder. He too represented Xerez and San Fernando.

== Club statistics ==
As of match played on 29 April 2018

Club	Season	League			Cup		Other		Total	
Club	Season	Division	Apps	Goals	Apps	Goals	Apps	Goals	Apps	Goals
Sevilla B	2004–05	Segunda División B	16	0	—		—		16	0
Sevilla B	2005–06	Segunda División B	34	4	—		4 (Note: Appearances in Promotion Play-offs)	0	38	4
Sevilla B	2006–07	Segunda División B	14	2	—		—		14	2
Sevilla B	Total		64	6	—		4	0	68	6
Sevilla	2005–06	La Liga	2	0	0	0	—		2	0
Sevilla	2006–07	La Liga	1	0	0	0	—		1	0
Sevilla	Total		3	0	0	0	—		3	0
Murcia	2006–07	Segunda División	9	0	0	0	—		9	0
Murcia	2007–08	La Liga	2	0	1	0	—		3	0
Murcia	2008–09	Segunda División	35	10	3	0	—		38	10
Murcia	2009–10	Segunda División	39	3	3	0	—		42	3
Murcia	Total		85	13	7	0	—		92	13
Salamanca (loan)	2007–08	Segunda División	17	0	0	0	—		17	0
Xerez	2010–11	Segunda División	24	0	2	0	—		26	0
Xerez	2011–12	Segunda División	23	0	1	0	—		24	0
Xerez	2012–13	Segunda División	28	0	0	0	—		28	0
Xerez	Total		75	0	3	0	—		78	0
Buriram United	2013	Thai Premier League	11	1			2 (Note: Appearances in AFC Champions League)	0	13	1
Girona	2013–14	Segunda División	1	0	0	0	—		1	0
Delhi Dynamos	2014	Indian Super League	10	1	—		—		10	1
NorthEast United	2015	Indian Super League	12	1	—		—		12	1
Atlético Baleares	2015–16	Segunda División B	7	0	0	0	—		7	0
Pune City	2016	Indian Super League	3	0	—		—		3	0
San Fernando	2016–17	Segunda División B	11	0	0	0	—		11	0
San Fernando	2017–18	Segunda División B	20	0	0	0	—		20	0
San Fernando	Total		31	0	0	0	—		31	0
Career total			308	21	10	0	6	0	324	21

== Honours ==
Sevilla B

- Segunda División B: 2006–07

Buriram United

- Thai Premier League: 2013
- Thai FA Cup: 2013
- Kor Royal Cup: 2013
