= Pedro Herrero Rubio =

Spanish Roman Catholic pediatrician

Venerable Pedro Herrero Rubio

Layman
- Born: 29 April 1904; Alicante, Spain
- Died: 5 November 1978 (aged 74); Hospital de Sant Pau, Barcelona, Spain
- Venerated in: Roman Catholic Church

Pedro Herrero Rubio (29 April 1904 - 5 November 1978) was a Spanish Roman Catholic pediatrician. Herrero studied in Madrid and later in both Paris and Brussels before he began his profession in pediatrics in his hometown of Alicante where he served his entire life. He was arrested during the Spanish Civil War but released not long after his arrest after the Alicante populace demanded his release. He dedicated himself to aiding the poor and would often visit poorer neighborhoods in order to tend to children. His services as a doctor earned him several accolades in his later life including an appointment to the town's civic council.

Herrero's reputation for holiness had been noted during his life to the point that the bishop presiding over his funeral said he would initiate his beatification cause; it opened in the 1990s and he became titled as a Servant of God. Herrero was named as Venerable in 2017 after Pope Francis confirmed that the late doctor had lived a life of heroic virtue.

== Life ==
Pedro Herrero Rubio was born in Alicante on 29 April 1904 as the sole child born to Pedro Herrero Martínez and Emilia Rubio Cabrera.

Herrero studied under the Marists in his hometown before doing additional studies at the Santo Domingo de los Jesuitas school in Orihuela under the Jesuits. He studied medicine from 1924 in Madrid in the Facultad de San Carlos in the Madrid college where he first specialized in gynecology though later switched to pediatrics. He also studied in both Paris (at its main college from 1927 after receiving a scholarship) and Brussels and then following the completion of his studies began working in Alicante. Herrero was a student of the Nobel Prize recipient Santiago Ramón i Cajal and the future Prime Minister Juan Negrín López. Herrero dedicated himself to the poor of his hometown (also working with the Red Cross on occasion) and would often use his own material resources in order to render aid to those poorer families that sometimes could not afford proper medical care. Herrero also visited poorer neighborhoods often in order to care for ill children. He also did not hesitate in baptizing children who were in danger of death irrespective of whether or not those children came from Catholic backgrounds.

He married Patrocinio Javaloy Lizón on 29 April 1931 but the couple had no children.

During the Spanish Civil War the anti-religious sentiment forced him to receive the sacraments in secret in clandestine Masses. Herrero was arrested in 1937 in Alicante during the conflict though was released soon after in 1938 after women and workers from his hometown demanded his release based on his generous dedication to their health in his work as a doctor. Upon his arrest he was moved to Valencia where he was jailed in the Santa Úrsula convent that had been remodeled into a prison. Upon his release he would tend to victims wounded in the conflict.

From 1954 until 1960 he served as a councilor in his hometown because the provincial governor appointed him for his characteristics and dedication and not because Herrero had a certain political affiliation. In October 1970 he was given a position to an important medical commission in recognition of his services while in October 1974 was given a golden medal for his work. In June 1976 he was awarded the First Class Cross and White Badge of the Civil Order of Charity and granted the title of Illustrious Son of Alicante in recognition for his work and for the impact he had on the lives of others in Alicante.

During a train trip he suffered a hernia prompting him to be admitted to hospital where he was diagnosed as having an intestinal obstruction. He was admitted for an operation but died in the operating room in the Hospital de Sant Pau in Barcelona on 5 November 1978. During his funeral the diocesan Bishop Pablo Barrachina Estevan announced that he would initiate the steps for the late doctor's beatification cause thus attesting to the strong reputation for holiness that Herrero had in life.

== Beatification process ==
Bishop Pedro Barrachina Estevan announced during Herrero's funeral that he would initiate the steps leading to the beatification process and in 1991 the Bishop (subsequently, a cardinal) Francisco Álvarez Martínez announced that he had authorized further steps to enact the cause. Herrero became titled as a Servant of God on 28 January 1997 after the Congregation for the Causes of Saints issued the official "nihil obstat" decree (no objections to the cause) thus enabling for the cause to proceed with their approval. The diocesan process was initiated under Bishop Victorio Oliver Domingo on 30 June 1997 and was closed on 9 June 1998; the C.C.S. issued a decree on 21 May 1999 validating the process as having complied with their regulations for conducting causes.

In 2011 the postulation - officials in charge of the cause - submitted the Positio dossier to the C.C.S. for assessment. This dossier included documentation and witness interrogatories essential to exploring Herrero's life and reputation for holiness. Herrero became titled as Venerable on 27 February 2017 after Pope Francis confirmed that he had lived a model life of heroic virtue.

His beatification depends on the papal confirmation of a miracle - in most cases a healing - that both medicine and science cannot explain. One such case was investigated under a diocesan tribunal and received validation from the C.C.S. on 9 March 2007.

The current postulator for this cause is Dr. Silvia Mónica Correale.
