= Nicolás Herrera =

Argentine footballer

Nicolás Víctor Herrera
Personal information
- Full name: Nicolás Víctor Herrera
- Date of birth: July 27, 1983 (age 43)
- Place of birth: La Rioja, Argentina
- Height: 1.75 m (5 ft 9 in)
- Position: Forward

Team information
- Current team: Andino

Youth career
- 2002–2005: Racing Club

Senior career*
Years	Team	Apps	(Gls)
2005–2006	Gimnasia de Jujuy	11	(0)
2006–2008	San Martín SJ	40	(4)
2008–2012	San Martín Tucumán	64	(7)
2012	Américo Tesorieri	5	(1)
2013–2014	Atlético Policial	19	(0)
2015	Unión Villa Krause	9	(1)
2016–2017	Andino		
2018–2019	Estudiantes La Rioja		
2020–	Andino		
- * Club domestic league appearances and goals as of 20:08, 24 March 2020 (UTC)

Nicolás Víctor Herrera (born 27 July 1983 in La Rioja) is an Argentine football forward. He currently plays for Andino Sport Club.

== Career ==
Herrera started his playing career in 2002 for Racing Club de Avellaneda. In 2005, he joined Gimnasia de Jujuy. In 2006 Herrera moved down a division to join San Martín de San Juan, but in 2007 the club secured promotion to the Argentine Primera División.

After a spell with Estudiantes La Rioja, Herrera returned to Andino SC in January 2020.
