= Julio Herrera (politician) =

Peruvian politician (born 1956)

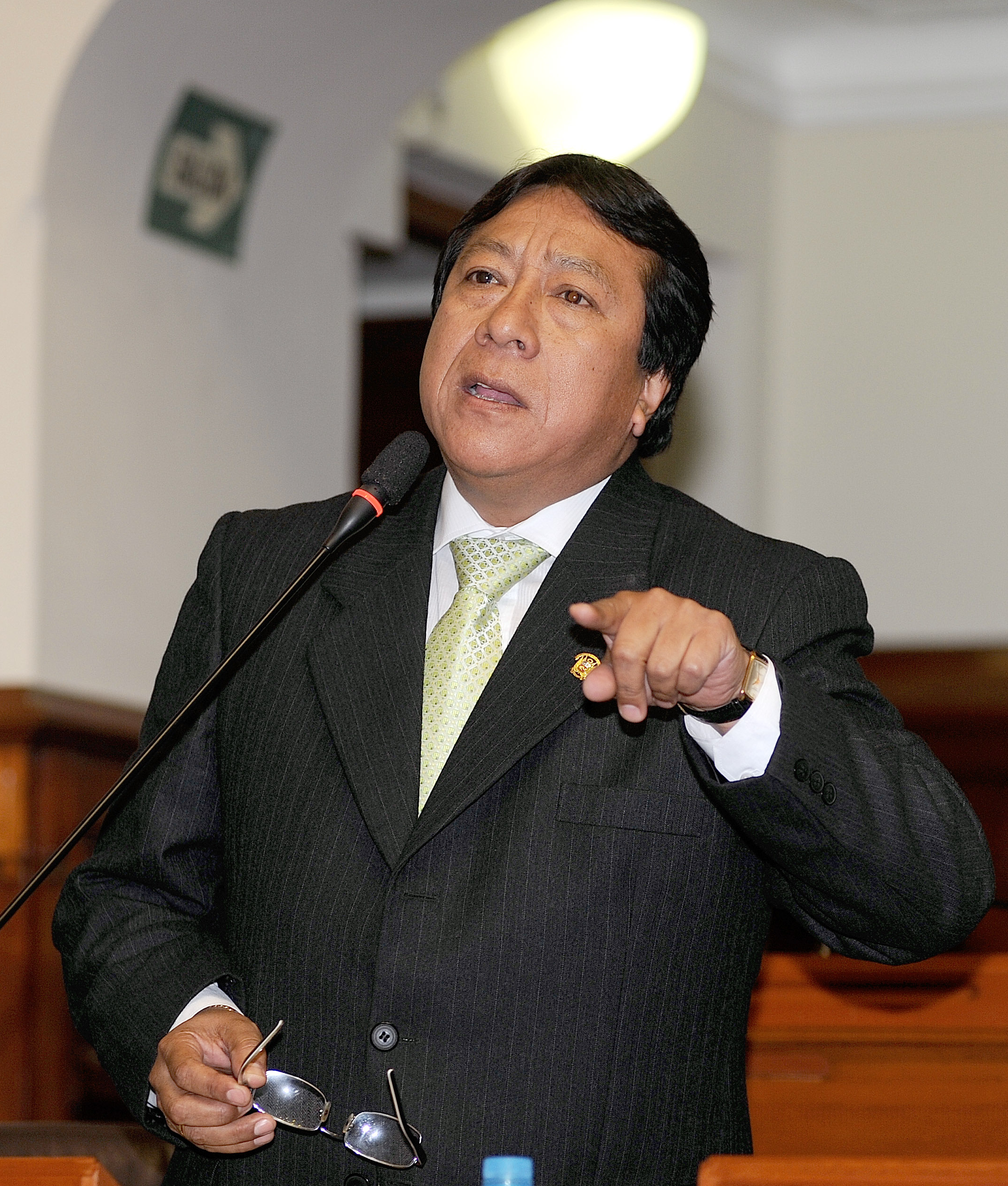
- Julio Herrera

Member of Congress
- In office 26 July 2006 – 26 July 2011
- Constituency: Lima

Personal details
- Born: Julio Roberto Herrera Pumayauli; 21 October 1956 (age 69) Lima, Peru
- Party: Peruvian Aprista Party
- Occupation: Politician

Julio Roberto Herrera Pumayauli (born 21 October 1956) is a Peruvian politician and a former Congressman, elected in the 2006 elections to represent Lima for the 2006–2011 term. Herrera belongs to the Peruvian Aprista Party. He did not run in the 2011 elections and retired from politics.
