= Joaquín Ramón Herrera =

American writer

- Born: March 6, 1969 (age 57); Los Angeles, California, U.S.
- Education: New York University
- Occupations: Video Producer, Documentarian, Writer, Illustrator
- Writing career
- Pen name: Nezua
- Genres: Juvenile Non-Fiction, Fiction, Political Commentary, Latino
- Website: joaquinramonherrera.com

Joaquin Ramon Herrera (born March 6, 1969, in Los Angeles, California) is an American author, illustrator, blogger, photographer, and an award-winning filmmaker and documentarian. Herrera is the son of writer and two-term U.S. Poet Laureate Juan Felipe Herrera.

== Life and career ==
From 2006 to 2016, Herrera maintained and published The Unapologetic Mexican blog, under the pseudonym Nezua. The blog focused on Latino, ethnicity/race, and immigration issues through a Mexican American lens. During its run, The Unapologetic Mexican gained widespread notoriety and many accolades, such as José Merino of Mexico's El Centro newspaper calling Herrera "a brilliant and incisive writer," and journalist Glenn Greenwald declaring that Herrera's site "provides some of the most passionate, insightful, and provocative commentary on race, ethnicity, immigration and politics that can be found online."

Due to the exposure gained by writing at The Unapologetic Mexican, Herrera was chosen to participate in events like Politicshome.com's "first-ever survey of the top 100 online voices and bloggers tracking trends and attitudes heading toward the 2008 Election Day" in guessing the outcome of the presidential election polls in all 20 battleground states. (Herrera successfully called 19 of 20 states, beating out Rob Schlesinger of U.S. News & World Report, James Forsyth of The Spectator, and Chuck Todd of First Read, NBC.) Many other opportunities arose from Herrera's public writing, including being chosen as a panelist for The French-American Foundation's international symposium on immigration in media: Ethnic Media in North America and Europe: A Comparative Approach, in Miami (November, 2009), and a speaker at Kirwan Institute's March 2010 event Transforming Race: Crisis and Opportunity in the age of Obama. Herrera was often sponsored to fly to such events to either speak on his style of blogging or to cover Latino or immigration-related topics. One high-profile event was in 2008, when Herrera was sponsored by Kenneth Cole Productions and CultureKitchen.net to attend the Democratic and Republican National Conventions as an officially credentialed blogger.

Joaquín Ramón Herrera was also the writer, anchor, producer, and sole creative force behind News With Nezua (2008 - 2016), a webisode eventually sponsored by different organizations throughout its tenure, including La Frontera Times, Reform Immigration for America, and Center for a New Community. News With Nezua was a valued voice in the online immigration, race, and Chicano dialogues, and many immigration-centric and Latino sites and blogs republished the episodes regularly.

== Honors ==
- As one of the founding editors of the immigration group blog The Sanctuary, Herrera accepted the 2009 New America Media award for Best Blogger on Ethnic Perspectives on behalf of the group, in Atlanta. In 2006, Hillary Rodham Clinton described the award as “the equivalent of the 'Pulitzer Prize” for journalism in ethnic media."
- Herrera's heavily illustrated book Scary: A Book of Horrible Things for Kids was a finalist for Foreword Magazine's 2005 Book of the Year Award in the Juvenile Non-Fiction category.
- Won statewide competition to represent Oregon as a Citizen Journalist (2008 election season) as one of 50 MTV News Street Team '08 reporters.
- Herrera was cinematographer on the 2005 Hollie Harper film Kiss and Run, which won Best Comedy in the American Theater of Harlem's Film Festival Cultures Collide.
- In 2010, Herrera was awarded a Narco News scholarship to the School of Authentic Journalism on the Yucatán peninsula (though he did not attend).
- Herrera was one of eight immigration bloggers selected by America's Voice to receive a 2009 full scholarship award to attend Netroots Nation.
- In 2019, Herrera directed Pipetown, USA, his first feature-length documentary. The documentary won six awards in 2020, including the Jury Award from the CannaBus Culture Film Fest, the Spotlight Silver Award from the Spotlight Documentary Film Awards, the Impact Docs Award of Merit, and the Colorado International Cannabis & Hemp Film Festival's CHESTNUT Award/Be the Change Award.

== Published works ==
Scary: A Book of Horrible Things for Kids (September 2005, Hylas Publishing)

Espeluznante: Un Libro De Cosas Horribles Para Ninos (Scary, Spanish version) (Selector, January 2006)

Gods, Gachupines and Gringos: A People's History of Mexico (January 2009, Editorial Mazatlán)

== Forthcoming works ==
Secret Visions in the Valley of Night (The DreamFever Chronicles, Book 1) (Self-published, December, 2016)

Lucy, Lightbringer, a short film currently in pre-production (Blazing Heart Productions)
