= Manolo Herrero (footballer, born 1970) =

Spanish footballer & manager (born 1970)

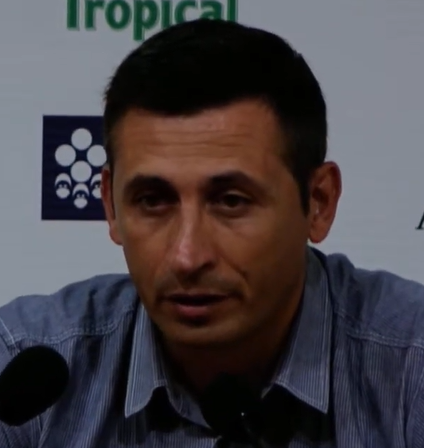
- Herrero as manager of Jaén in 2013

Personal information
- Full name: Manuel Herrero Galaso
- Date of birth: 28 June 1970 (age 56)
- Place of birth: Andújar, Spain
- Height: 1.79 m (5 ft 10 1/2 in)
- Position: Midfielder

Team information
- Current team: Jaén (manager)

Senior career*
Years	Team	Apps	(Gls)
1987–1991	Iliturgi		
1991–1994	Jaén	111	(22)
1994–1995	Valladolid	5	(0)
1995	→ Córdoba (loan)	21	(6)
1995–1996	Jaén	43	(6)
1996–1998	Málaga	64	(10)
1998–2000	Granada	32	(1)
2000–2003	Gimnàstic	115	(12)
2003–2006	Jaén	101	(8)
Total		492+	(65+)

Managerial career
- 2006–2009: Jaén B (assistant)
- 2009–2010: Jaén B
- 2009: Jaén (caretaker)
- 2011–2014: Jaén
- 2015–2016: Hércules
- 2016: Ponferradina
- 2017–2018: Melilla
- 2018–2019: Murcia
- 2019–2020: Melilla
- 2021–2022: Melilla
- 2025–: Jaén
- * Club domestic league appearances and goals

Manuel "Manolo" Herrero Galaso (born 28 June 1970) is a Spanish former professional footballer who played as a midfielder. He is currently manager of Primera Federación club Real Jaén.

His career was closely associated to Jaén, as both a player and a coach.

== Playing career ==
Born in Andújar, Province of Jaén, Andalusia, Herrero made his senior debut with local amateurs Iliturgi CF before joining Real Jaén in 1991. He left the latter three years later and moved straight to La Liga with Real Valladolid, but totalled only 245 minutes of action in his only season, also being loaned to Córdoba CF during his tenure.

Herrero competed solely in the Segunda División B in the following years, representing Jaén, Málaga CF, Granada CF and Gimnàstic de Tarragona. He achieved promotion with the Catalans in 2001, but was relegated the next season.

Herrero returned to Jaén for the second time in the 2003 off-season, retiring at the end of the 2005–06 campaign after a further three years in the third level, aged 36. He totalled 272 matches for his main club in seven years, 253 in the league, 16 in the Copa del Rey and three in the Copa Federación de España, scoring 40 goals in all competitions.

== Coaching career ==
After retiring, Herrero was an assistant manager of Real Jaén B, being promoted to head coach in the summer of 2009 as they competed in the regional championships. He left at the end of the season, and joined the first team.

In February 2011, after working with the club as a match delegate, Herrero obtained a professional licence, being named Jaén's manager after replacing fired José Miguel Campos. In 2012–13, he led the side to the first place in the regular season and the subsequent playoff promotion, which meant a return to Segunda División after an 11-year absence.

On 4 July 2013, Herrero signed a new contract. He left the club the following year, after his side's relegation.

Herrero signed with Hércules CF in the third tier on 26 January 2015, taking over from the sacked Pacheta. He was dismissed roughly one year later, following a 0–2 home loss against CD Alcoyano.

On 14 June 2016, Herrero was appointed SD Ponferradina manager, lasting only four months in charge. On 20 May 1017, he signed with UD Melilla.

Herrero took over Real Murcia CF on 11 June 2018. Having won eight of 26 games, he was relieved of his duties the following 27 February.

On 5 November 2019, Herrero returned to Melilla, 13th in their third-division group. He left at the end of the season, before rejoining in June 2021 with the team now in the Segunda División RFEF.

Herrero left by mutual consent on 21 February 2022, being subsequently replaced by Miguel Rivera. On 24 January 2025, he returned to Jaén for a second spell as manager.

On 5 June 2026, after overseeing a second consecutive promotion, Herrero agreed to a new one-year deal.

== Managerial statistics ==
As of 10 November 2026

Managerial record by team and tenure
Team	Nat	From	To	Record								Ref
Team	Nat	From	To	G	W	D	L	GF	GA	GD	Win %	Ref
Jaén B	(Spain)	1 July 2009	30 June 2010	34	16	5	13	54	49	+5	47.06	
Jaén (caretaker)	(Spain)	27 August 2009	31 August 2009	1	0	0	1	0	1	−1	0.00	
Jaén	(Spain)	6 January 2011	11 June 2014	155	66	47	42	172	134	+38	42.58	
Hércules	(Spain)	26 January 2015	17 January 2016	42	19	12	11	45	37	+8	45.24	
Ponferradina	(Spain)	14 June 2016	17 October 2016	10	4	3	3	10	11	−1	40.00	
Melilla	(Spain)	20 May 2017	28 May 2018	39	17	9	13	43	25	+18	43.59	
Murcia	(Spain)	11 June 2018	27 February 2019	27	8	13	6	24	20	+4	29.63	
Melilla	(Spain)	5 November 2019	30 June 2020	18	6	5	7	19	22	−3	33.33	
Melilla	(Spain)	15 June 2021	22 February 2022	23	7	6	10	25	28	−3	30.43	
Jaén	(Spain)	24 January 2025	Present	73	38	20	15	105	72	+33	52.05	
Total				422	181	120	121	497	399	+98	42.89	—

== Honours ==
=== Manager ===
Jaén

- Segunda División B: 2012–13
