= Roberto Herrera =

Argentinian dancer, choreographer, and dance teacher

Roberto Herrera (born September 5, 1963, in San Salvador de Jujuy) is an Argentinian dancer, choreographer and dance teacher, known for the Tango.

== Education ==
Herrera first started learning Argentinian and Latin American folk dances at the age of eight and began his training in Tango Argentino when he was twelve. Among his teachers were Antonio Todaro and Pepito Avellaneda.

== Career ==
He has worked as dancer as well as choreographer for orchestras of renowned composers such as Osvaldo Pugliese, Leopoldo Federico, Julián Plaza, Beba Pugliese, Osvaldo Berlingieri, Néstor Marconi, Horacio Salgán und José Colángelo. With some of these orchestras, Herrera went on tour multiple times throughout Europe as well as Japan.

From 1986 until 1990, Herrera was principal dancer (primer bailarin) of the National Folkloric Ballet (Ballet Folklórico Nacional) under Santiago Ayala "El Chucaro" and Norma Viola. At the same time, he worked in various Tango establishments.

In 1986 Herrera featured as a solo dancer in Marcus Zurinaga’s movie Tango Bar. Two years later, in 1988, he starred in the role of Martín Fierro, based on the epic poem by José Hernández, in the play Aquí me pongo a cantar (english: "Here I start to sing") in the Teatro de las Provincias in Buenos Aires. In 1993 Herrera worked as a solo dancer for the dance company Tango Pasión with the orchestra Sexteto Mayor. In 1994 he featured in the movie Muchas gracias maestro, which is based on the life of Osvaldo Pugliese. From 1995 until 1999, Herrera was artistic director as well as protagonist of the show "Tango, una Historia" in the Buenos Aires upscale bar El Querandí, thus becoming one of the forerunners of similar shows found today in the various Casas de Tango of Buenos Aires.

In 1997 Herrera was part of the opening show of the movie premiere of Evita in Buenos Aires as choreographer and dancer. The same year, he presided over the closing show of the Mar del Plata International Film Festival. In 2000 he featured as soloist together with his dance partner Lorena Yacono in the Gershwin Theatre’s Broadway musical Tango Argentino. In 2004 he was guest dancer, together with Mora Godoy, in the leading role of Gaudencio in the musical Tanguera in the Teatro El Nacional in Buenos Aires.

In 2002 Herrera founded the Tango company Compañía Roberto Herrera Tango and has been its director ever since. As part of the festivities surrounding the 2002 FIFA World Cup in Seoul, he and his company performed the show "Tango de Hoy" together with Natacha Poberaj. In 2005 he went on his first tour through Europe with his show "Tango Nuevo de Roberto Herrera". So far, he and his company have performed more than 300 times all over the world with shows such as "Tango de Hoy", "Tango Nuevo de Roberto Herrera", "Tango, Una Historia", "Tango de Buenos Aires", "Tango Origin" and "El Tango".

In 2004, in addition to his dance company, Herrera also founded his own dance school, the Herrera Tango Academy, with branches in Buenos Aires, Milan and Munich. The Munich branch also closely cooperates with the local Tango school Tango genial.

Herrera has been teaching Tango since 1979, offering workshops all over the world and regularly performs at Tango festivals. Since 2003 he has been a member of the jury of the World tango dance tournament.

== Awards ==
- 2012: Maestro Formador y Transmisor Popular Argentino de la Danza, awarded by the Consejo Argentino de la Danza (C.A.D.)

== See also ==
- Herrera Tango Academy (Spanish)
