= Iván Herrera (footballer) =

Chilean footballer (born 1985)

Personal information
- Full name: Iván Rodrigo Herrera Muñoz
- Date of birth: 10 October 1985 (age 41)
- Place of birth: Talcahuano, Chile
- Height: 1.70 m (5 ft 7 in)
- Position: Midfielder

Youth career
- Deportivo Lamiplanch
- Huachipato

Senior career*
Years	Team	Apps	(Gls)
2005–2010	Huachipato	27	(2)
2007	→ Rangers (loan)	4	(0)
2009	→ Tecos B (loan)	11	(1)
2009	→ Naval (loan)	5	(0)
2010	Deportes Puerto Montt	15	(0)
2011	Coquimbo Unido	21	(0)
2013–2014	Deportes Valdivia	40	(11)
2014–2015	Iberia	15	(0)
2015–2016	Naval	31	(13)
2016	Magallanes	1	(0)
2016–2017	Deportes Santa Cruz	27	(6)
2017	Deportes Melipilla	5	(1)
2019–2020	Chapulineros de Oaxaca	–	(–)
Total		202	(34)
- * Club domestic league appearances and goals

Iván Rodrigo Herrera Muñoz (born 10 October 1985) is a Chilean former professional footballer who played as a midfielder.

== Career ==
A product of Huachipato, Herrera came to the club from Deportivo Lamiplanch, after playing in a youth championship. Along with Huachipato U17, he won the Juegos de la Araucanía Championship in 2003. He made his professional debut in 2005 versus Deportes La Serena. Since 2007, he played for many clubs in the Chilean footballsuch as Iberia, Naval, Deportes Melipilla, among other clubs. In addition, in 2009 he had a step with the Tecos B-team in the Liga Premier de México.

He is well-remembered by the Naval de Talcahuano fans after his two steps with the team.

In 2019 he joined Chapulineros de Oaxaca in the Serie B de México, also playing for the Football 7 team. In the context of COVID-19 pandemic, in 2020 he returned to Chile while he was a player of Chapulineros de Oaxaca.

== Personal life ==
He was nicknamed Pichunga since he was a child, due to the fact that he used to say Pichunga instead of Pichanga, an informal form to refer to a football game in Chile.

Since his step with Tecos B, he has a close friendship with the Mexican international goalkeeper José de Jesús Corona.
