= Carlos Enrique Prado Herrera =

Cuban artist

Carlos Enrique Prado
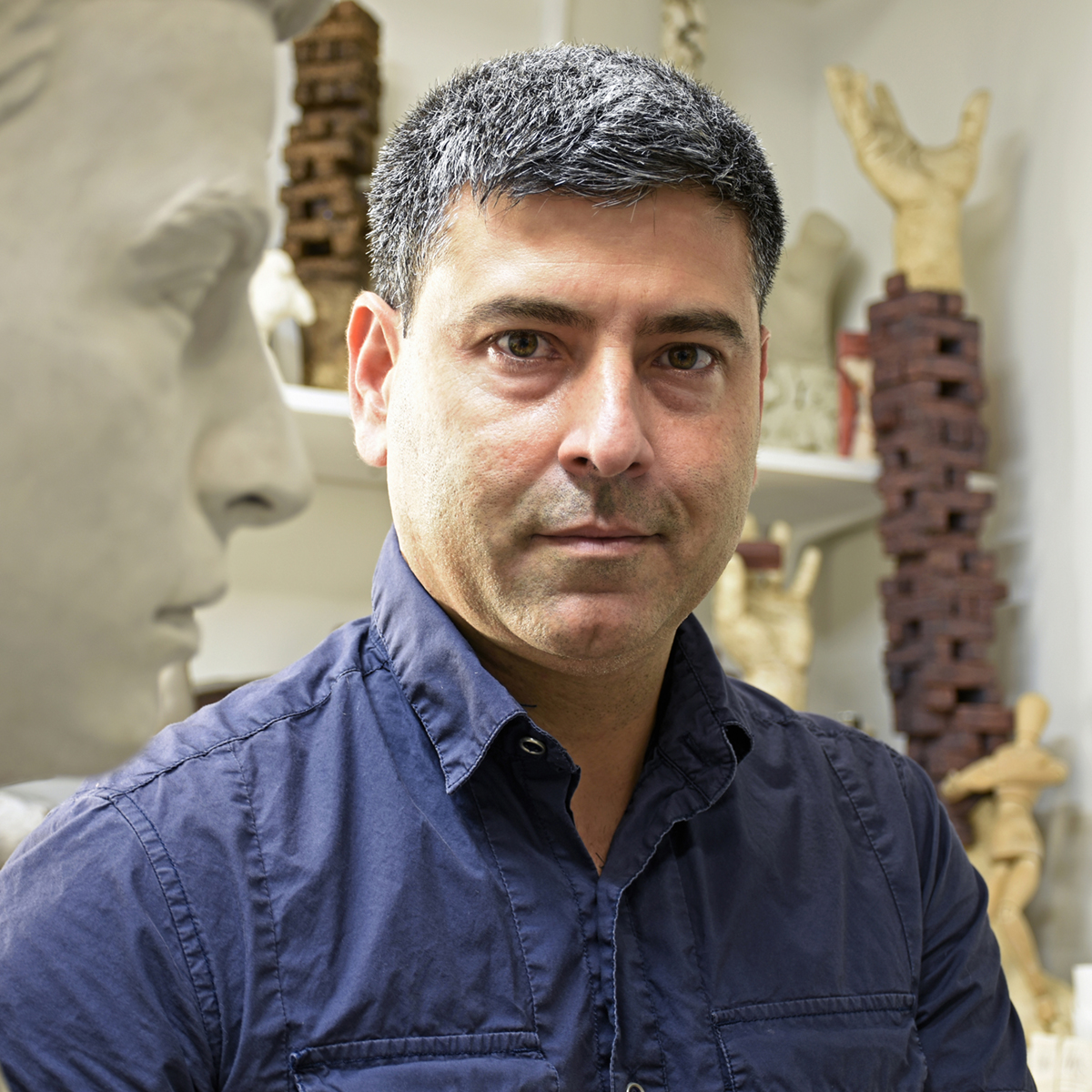
- Born: 1978 (age 47–48); Havana, Cuba
- Education: Instituto Superior de Arte; Academia San Alejandro
- Known for: Sculpture and ceramics
- Notable work: Ronald Reagan Equestrian Monument
- Awards: Miami Individual Artists Grant (2023, 2024)

Carlos Enrique Prado (born 1978) is a contemporary Cuban artist recognized for his contributions to the fields of ceramic sculpture and public art. Currently residing in Miami, Florida, Prado is actively engaged in both the creation of his art and the sharing of his expertise as a professor at the University of Miami in Coral Gables. His artistic endeavors span various mediums, including sculpture, ceramics, drawing, digital art, performance, installations, and interventions, showcasing versatility and creativity throughout his career. One of his notable recent achievements is the completion of the Ronald Reagan Equestrian Monument, a major public sculpture commissioned by Miami-Dade County and situated at the Tropical Park in Miami, Florida. In 2023, Carlos was selected as a member of the International Academy of Ceramics (AIC/IAC) based in Geneva, Switzerland. His affiliation with the AIC/IAC not only signifies his international recognition but also underscores his active engagement with the global ceramics community.

== Education ==
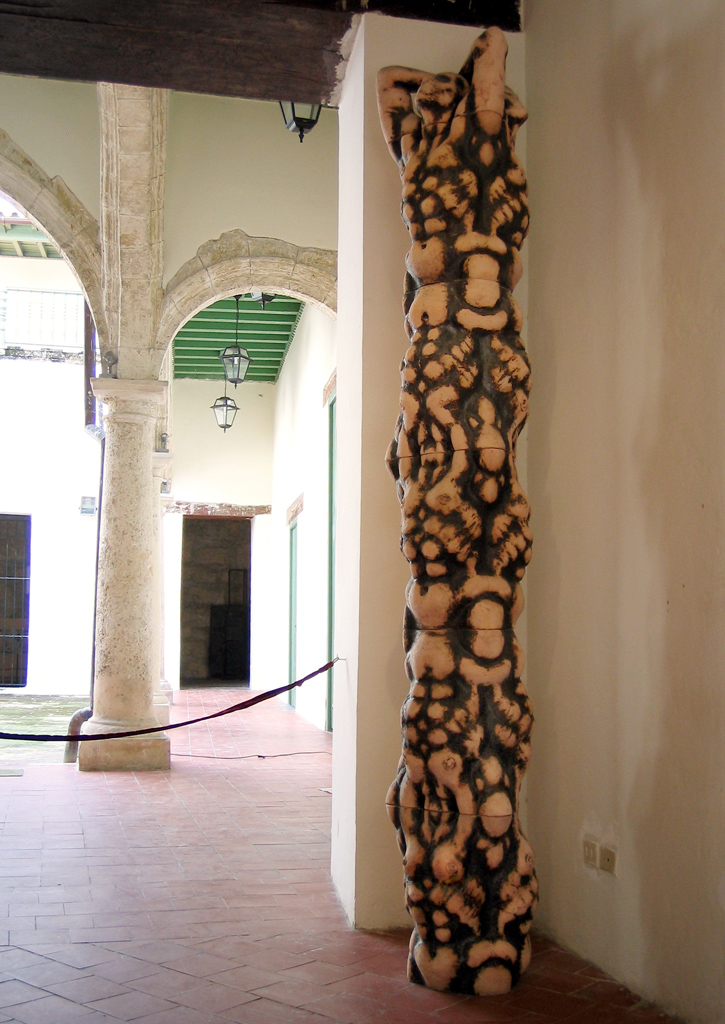
Atlantes, 2004. Collection National Museum of Contemporary Cuban Ceramics, Havana.

Carlos initiated his artistic education by completing his studies in sculpture and drawing at the San Alejandro National Academy of Fine Arts in Havana in 1996. Founded in 1818, San Alejandro is the second oldest beaux arts academy in Latin America that has been teaching since its establishment, boasting a great reputation. Subsequently, he pursued a Bachelor of Fine Art in Sculpture, Summa Cum Laude, at ISA University of the Arts of Cuba, formerly known as Instituto Superior de Arte, graduating in 2002. This university, renowned for forming distinguished artists in various arts disciplines, including visual arts, performing arts, music, cinema, and dance, had already accumulated great prestige as an institution. Carlos continued his academic journey, earning a Master of Fine Art (Studio Art) degree from ISA University of the Arts of Cuba in 2008, further solidifying his expertise in the realm of Studio Art.

== Teaching experience ==
Carlos has been a faculty member at the University of Miami since 2014. With a specialization in teaching the human figure in clay, he also imparts ceramics hand-building and wheel-throwing techniques to his students and teaches studio art at the graduate level with an emphasis on ceramics. Prior to his current position, he served as an assistant professor of sculpture and ceramics at the Visual Arts School of the University of Arts of Cuba ISA from 2002 to 2012. During his tenure, he taught various courses, including Studio Art Practice and "Personal Project in Ceramics." Additionally, Carlos actively contributed to the admission and thesis committees and assumed the role of the head of the Sculpture Department from 2006 to 2011. Demonstrating his versatility, he also taught the Live Modeling in Clay course at The Royal University College of Arts (KKH) in Stockholm, Sweden, in 2007. Furthermore, he conducted a summer class on Large-scale Ceramic Sculptures at the University of Mary Washington in Virginia, USA, in 2011. Carlos's expertise extends beyond the classroom, as he conducted demonstrations on the Portrait in Clay at various places, including the NCECA Conference in 2018 and the Midwestern State University in Texas in 2011.

== Visiting artist ==
Carlos has been a visiting artist at various institutions, including the University of Southern California, East Los Angeles College, Midwestern State University, Arizona State University, University of Mary Washington, Florida International University, University of Alabama, and Royal University College of Arts (KKH) in Stockholm, Sweden.

== Collections ==
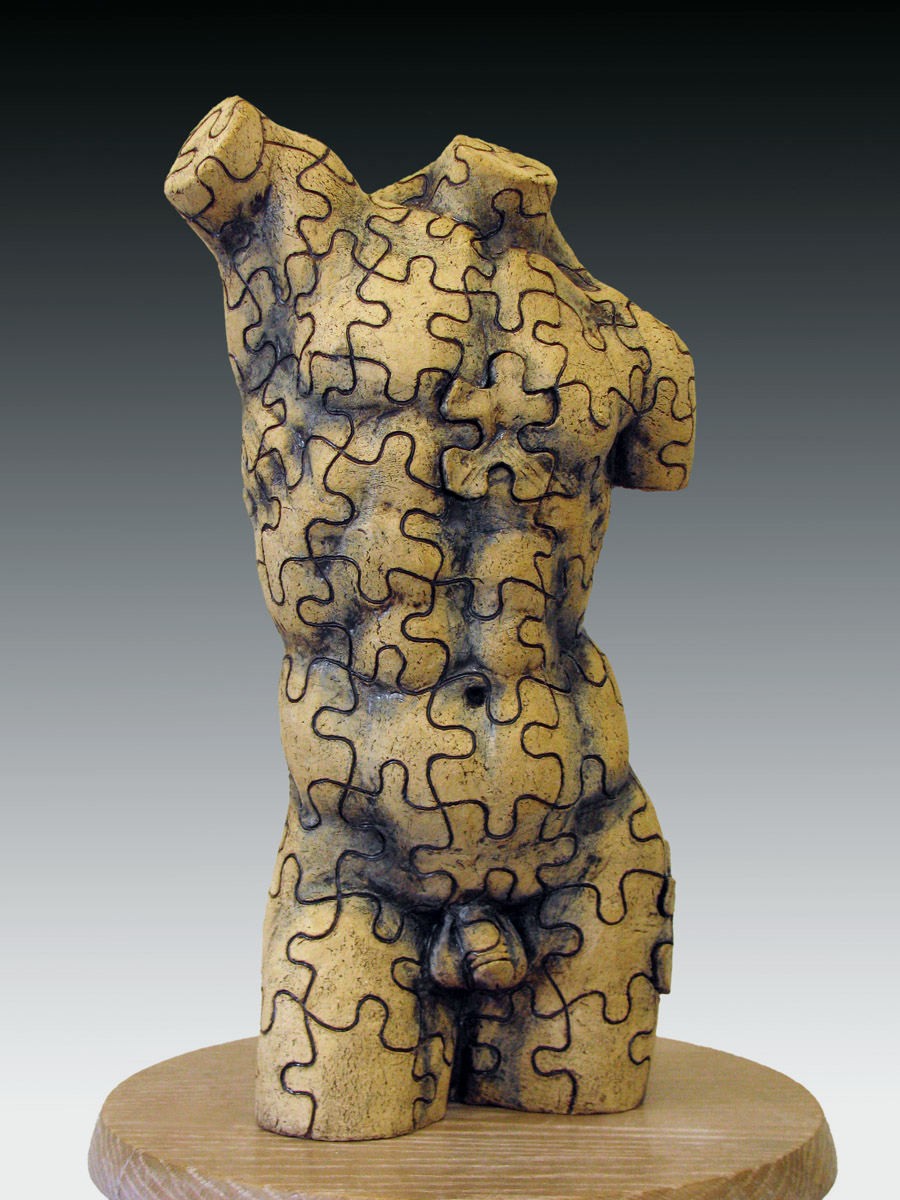
No Game, 2011. Collection ASU Art Museum, Ceramic Research Center, Arizona, US.

Prado's artistic contributions have earned a place in several distinguished public collections, underscoring the recognition and appreciation of his work. His pieces are prominently featured in the Art in Public Places Collection of Miami-Dade County, reflecting the local government's interest in bringing Prado's art into public spaces. Furthermore, his artworks are preserved in the National Museum of Cuban Contemporary Ceramics, showcasing his influence on the Cuban contemporary art scene. In addition, Carlos's pieces contribute to the research and study of ceramic art at the ASU Art Museum - Ceramic Research Center. His artistic presence extends beyond national borders, with pieces housed in the Museum of Contemporary Ceramics (MCC) in Santo Domingo, Dominican Republic, and the Museum of Contemporary Art of the Americas (MoCAAmericas) in Miami, Florida, USA. These collections serve as enduring repositories of Carlos's artistic legacy, offering future generations access to his diverse and impactful body of work.

== Awards / Honors ==
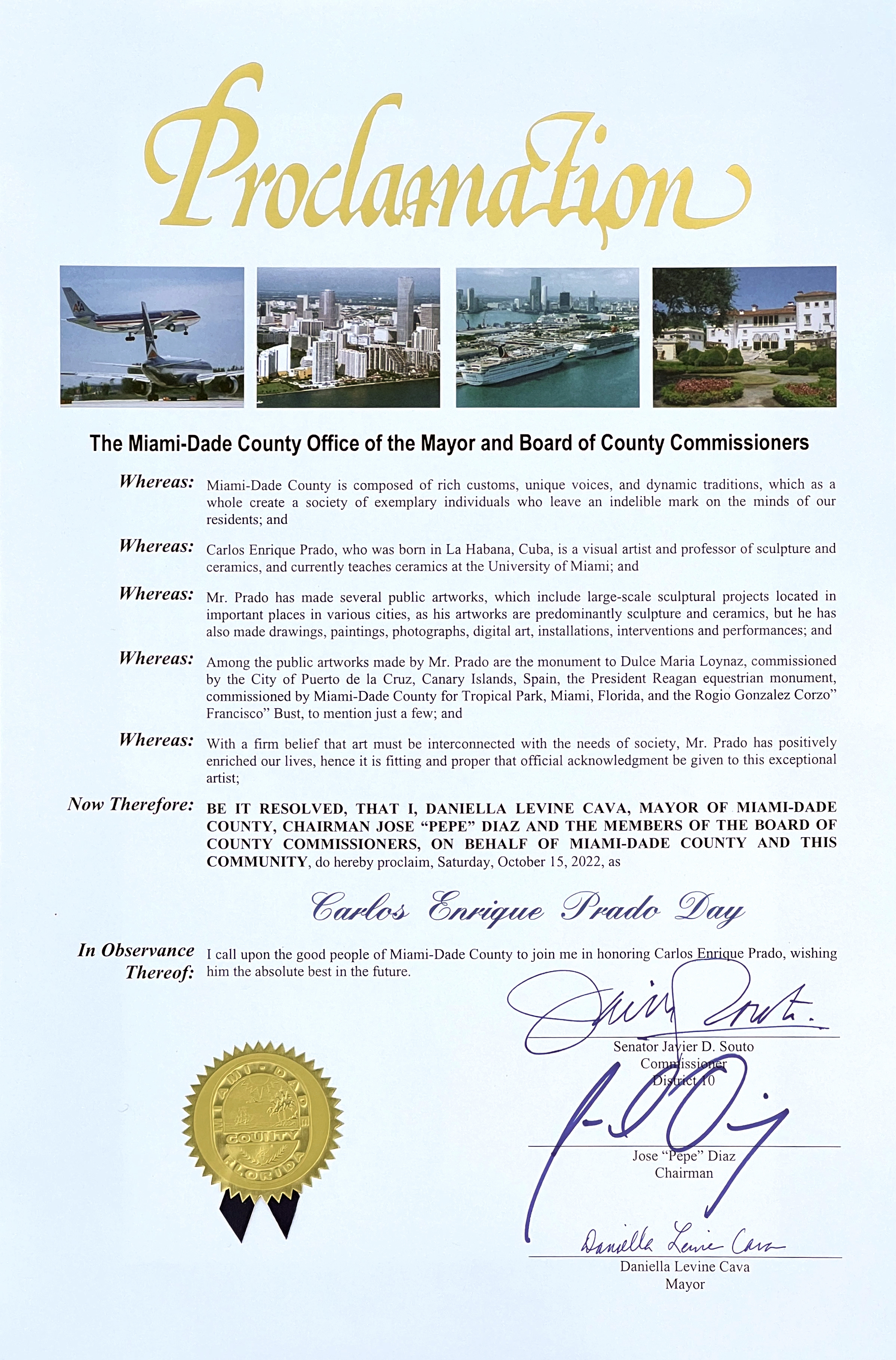
Official Proclamation issued by the Miami-Dade County Mayor and Board of County Commissioners declaring Carlos Enrique Prado Day in the County, honoring his numerous public art projects.

Carlos Enrique Prado has been recognized multiple times for his contributions to the arts, receiving both prestigious awards and grants. In 2024 and 2023, he was honored with the Miami Individual Artists (MIA) Grant, funded by the Miami-Dade County Department of Cultural Affairs. This initiative is supported by the Miami-Dade County Mayor, the Board of County Commissioners, and the Cultural Affairs Council, which acknowledges the exceptional individual artists within the region.

In 2022, Carlos' work was celebrated with an official proclamation from the Mayor of Miami-Dade County and the Board of County Commissioners, declaring the "Carlos Enrique Prado Day." This recognition highlighted his outstanding public art projects and their impact on the community. The same year, he received the Recognition Award at the Biennial of Cuban Contemporary Ceramics hosted by the Museum of Cuban Contemporary Ceramics, reinforcing his influence in the ceramic arts.

Earlier in his career, Carlos earned Second Place for Installation at the 2007 Biennial of Ceramics: "The Mural and the Vessel," held at the Museum of Cuban Contemporary Ceramics. In 2006 and 2004, he was awarded Third Place and a Mention at the VIII and VII Biennials of Ceramics "Amelia Peláez." Additionally, he garnered international acclaim in 2003 with an Award at the International Triennial of Ceramics Elit-Tile, organized by the Museum of Modern Arts of Santo Domingo in the Dominican Republic. His artistic journey began with notable recognition in 1996 when he won the Award in Sculpture at Academia ‘96, an international event for art schools hosted by the San Alejandro National Academy of Fine Arts in Cuba. His achievements reflect his dedication to pushing boundaries in ceramics and contemporary art.

== Work in Public Places ==
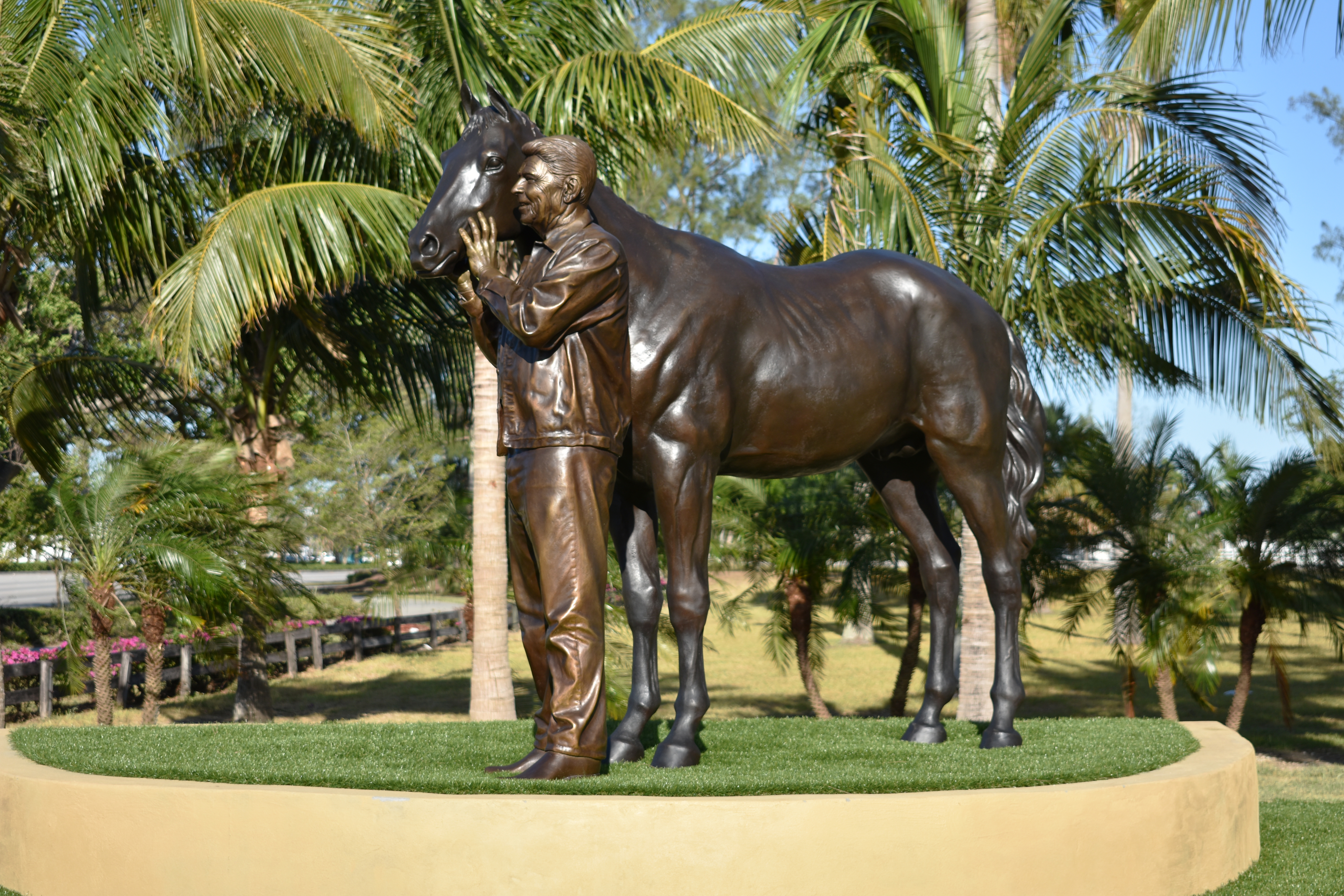
Ronald Reagan Equestrian Monument by artist Carlos Enrique Prado, at Tropical Park, Miami, Florida, 2018. Miami-Dade County Art in Public Places collection.

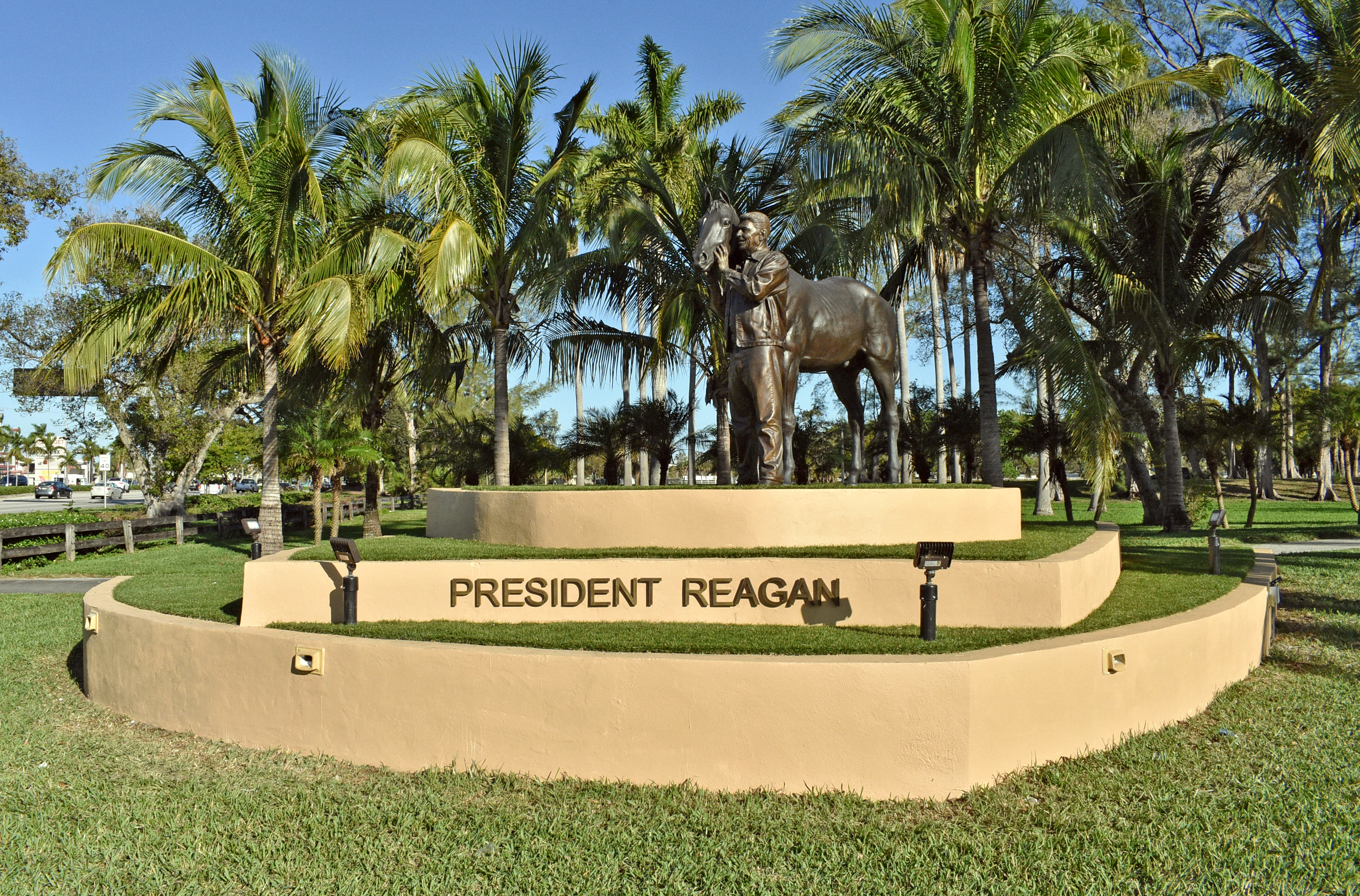
Ronald Reagan Equestrian Monument by artist Carlos Enrique Prado, at Tropical Park, Miami, Florida, 2018. Miami-Dade County Art in Public Places collection.

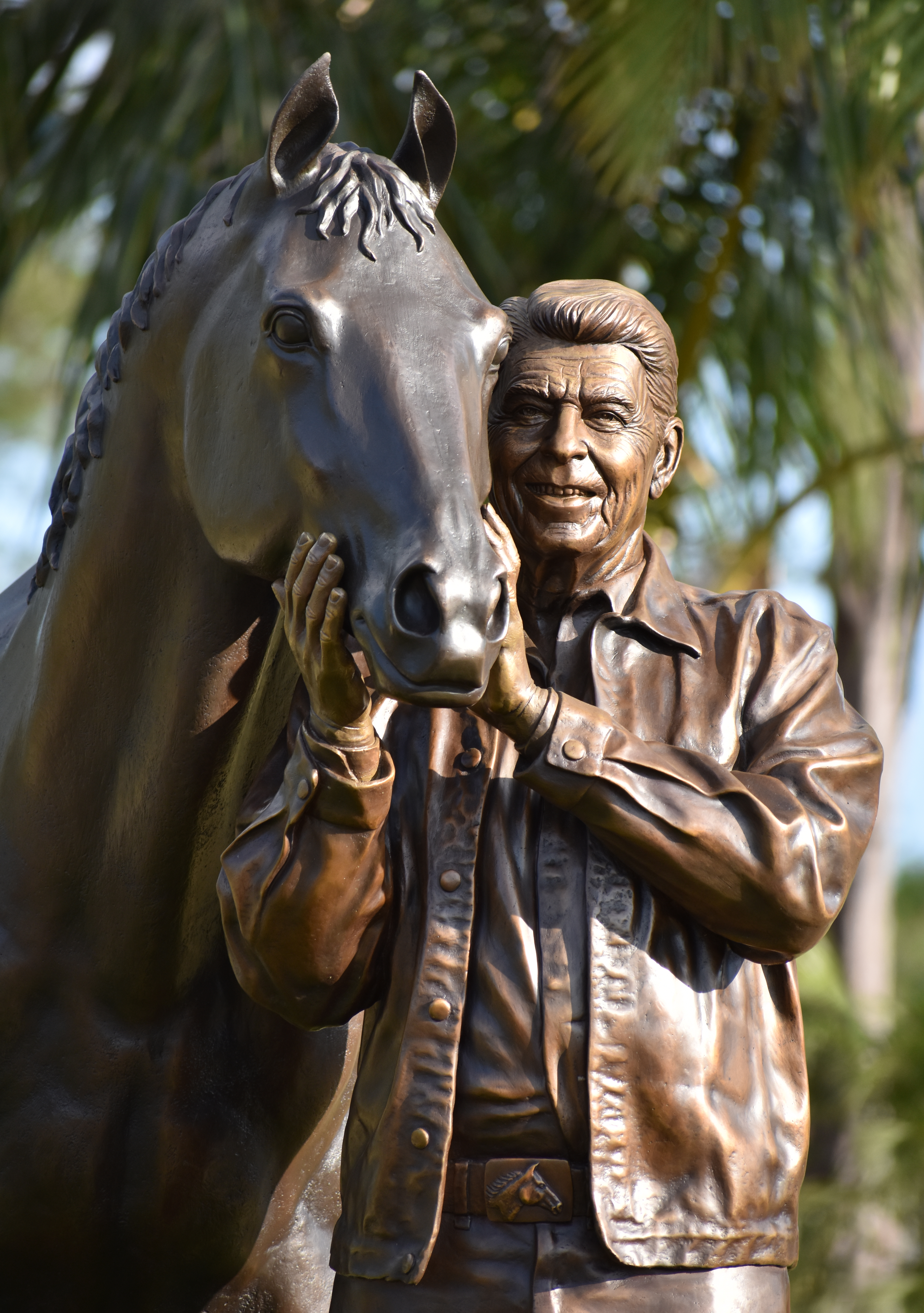
Ronald Reagan Equestrian Monument by artist Carlos Enrique Prado, at Tropical Park, Miami, Florida, 2018. Miami-Dade County Art in Public Places collection.

Carlos Enrique's profound impact on public art is exemplified through his diverse contributions to installations commissioned by Miami-Dade County. These include the Serafin Sanchez Valdivia Monument, a bronze sculpture located in General Serafin Sanchez Park in Olympia Heights, Florida; the Rogelio Gonzalez Corzo “Francisco” Monument, adding cultural significance to Francisco Human Rights Park, Florida; "Rising Above the Horizon," a large-scale public sculpture at Medley Town Hall Monument Plaza, Florida; the iconic President Reagan Equestrian Monument at Tropical Park in Miami, Florida, a major sculpture in bronze symbolizing the connection between man and horse; and the Dulce María Loynáz Monument in Taoro Park, Puerto de la Cruz, Spain, commissioned by the City of Puerto de la Cruz. Each artwork, ranging from 2002 to 2022, showcases Carlos's ability to weave narratives that resonate with the cultural and historical context of diverse locations, enriching public spaces with his artistic vision.

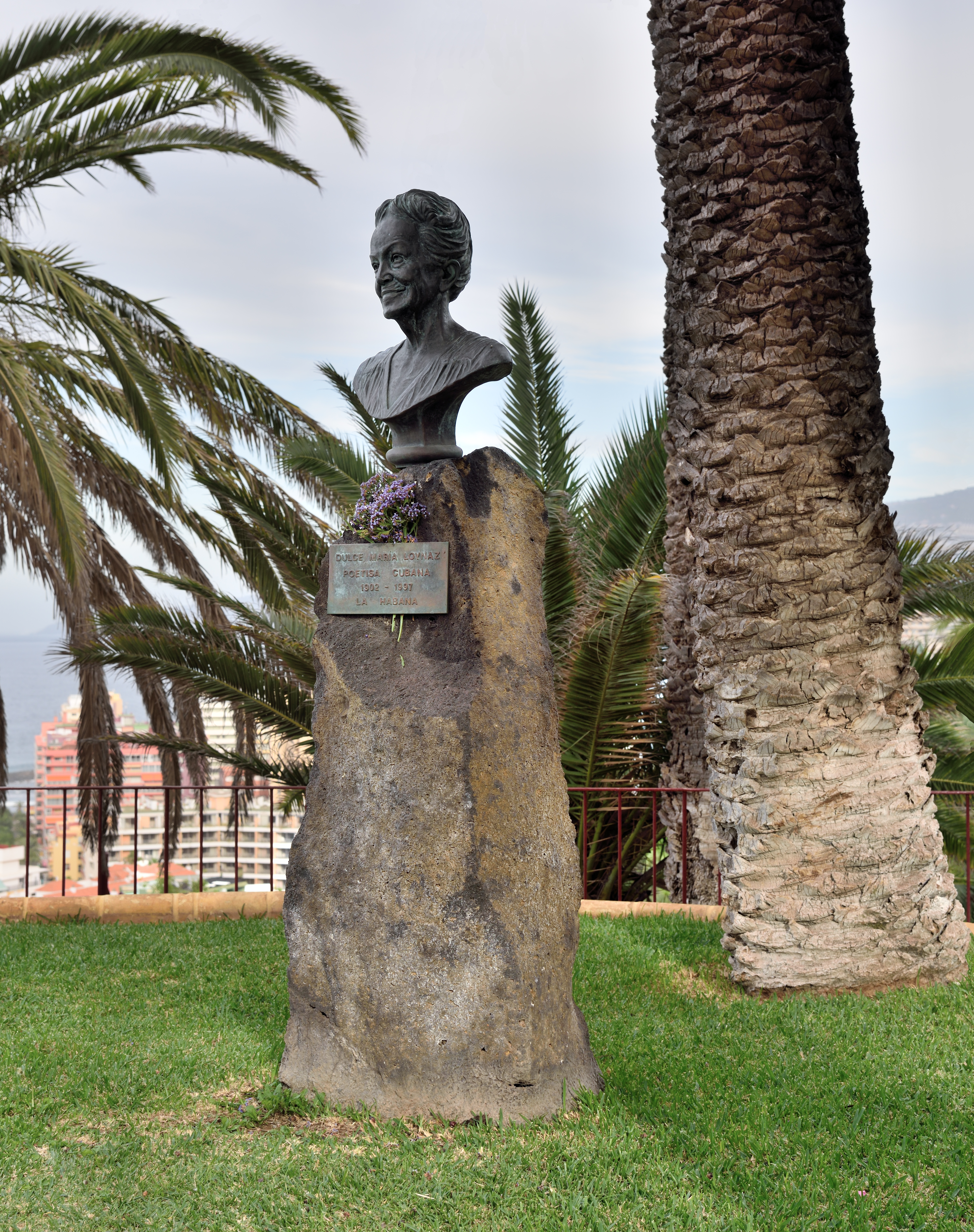
Monument commemorating Dulce María Loynaz (1912–1999), Cuban writer, in Puerto de la Cruz, Tenerife, Canary Islands, Spain. The monument is by the Cuban artist Carlos Enrique Prado. The sculpture is located in Los Jardines de la Atalaya, which is part of Parque de Taoro.

== Exhibitions ==
Carlos Enrique Prado has showcased his artistic evolution through solo exhibitions, with notable presentations such as “Stubborn” (2024) at the Museum of Contemporary Art of the Americas, Miami, Florida, and “Tautologies” (2022) at the Kendall Art Cultural Center, Miami, Florida. These recent exhibitions featured sculptures incorporating clay 3D-printing technology, offering insight into Carlos’s contemporary approach to ceramics.

Another significant solo exhibition, “Preludio y Fuga” (2010), took place at the Convent of San Francisco de Asís in Havana, where Carlos presented digital prints and installations as part of the 10th Biennial of Ceramics of Havana. Over the years, he has consistently presented solo exhibitions, including “El ícono escamoteado” (2009) at the Hispanic-American Center of Culture in Havana, “Terapia sanitaria” (2008) at the Ludwig Foundation of Cuba, “Re-Visiones” (2006) at the National Museum of Contemporary Cuban Ceramics, “Todo para llevar” at the Galiano Gallery in Havana, and “Otra forma más de mirar lo mismo” (2005) at the Gallery of the Cultural Center ICAIC, among others.

In addition to his solo exhibitions, Carlos has actively participated in numerous group exhibitions, showcasing his work alongside other artists in various venues. Notable among these are exhibitions at the Museum of Art-DeLand (Florida), Armazém das Artes (Alcobaça, Portugal), the Museum of Contemporary Art of the Americas (Miami, Florida), the Museum of Arts & Sciences (Daytona Beach, Florida), LH Horton Jr. Art Gallery (Stockton, California), Kendall Art Center (Miami, Florida), the Sidney & Berne Davis Art Center (Fort Myers, Florida), the National Museum of Contemporary Cuban Ceramics (Havana, Cuba), and the Potter Fine Arts Gallery (St. Joseph, Missouri).

His involvement in these group exhibitions reflects his collaborative spirit and engagement with the broader artistic discourse. Whether contributing to the cultural vibrancy of Miami’s Wynwood Arts District or engaging with diverse artistic perspectives at the Reuben Saunders Gallery (Wichita, Kansas), Carlos’s participation in group exhibitions underscores his commitment to fostering a shared artistic dialogue.

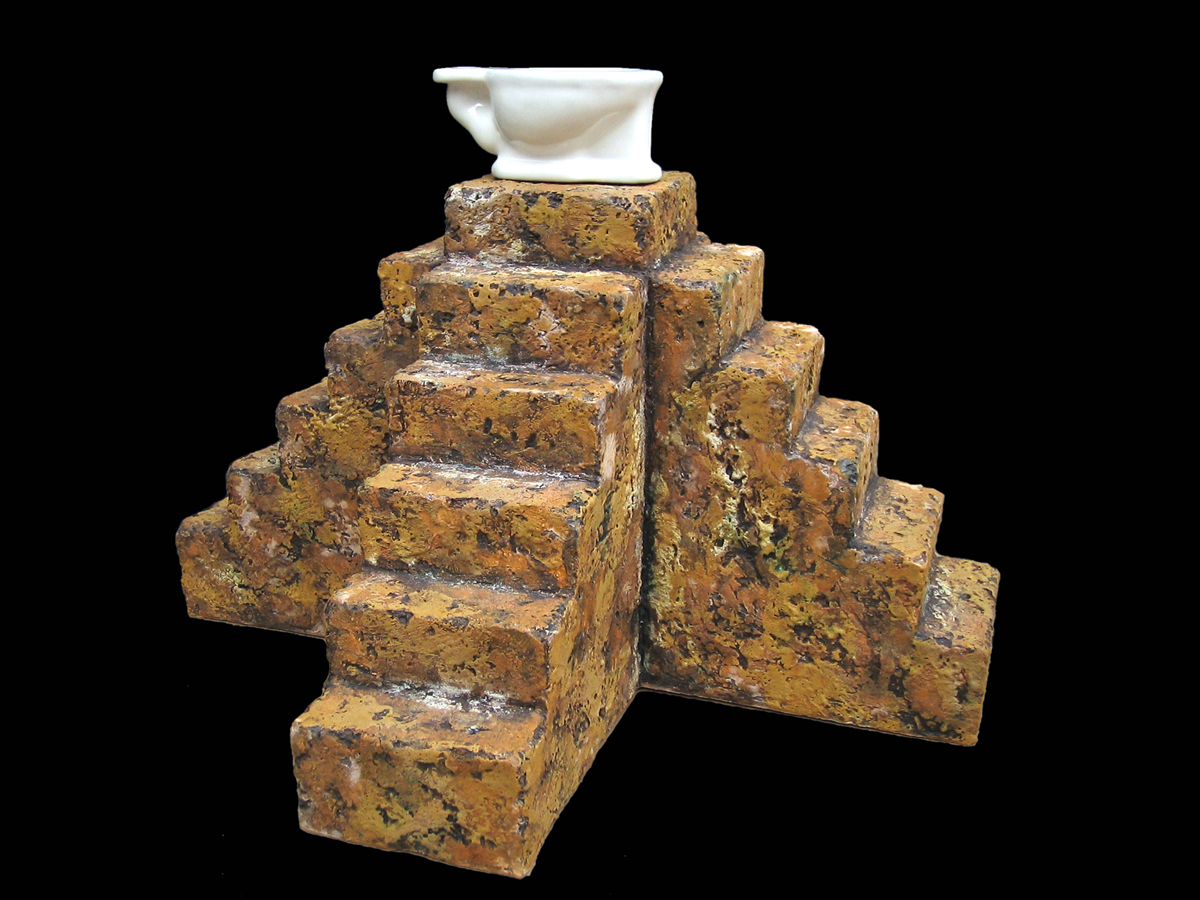
Monument, 2007. Collection National Museum of Contemporary Cuban Ceramics, Havana.

== Lectures ==
Prado has shared his insights and knowledge through lectures at various institutions. His engagements include presentations at the Ceramics Research Center at the ASU Art Museum, Midwestern State University, the National Museum of the Cuban Contemporary Ceramics, the University of Mary Washington, and the University of Alabama, among others. These lectures cover various topics, from his personal artwork to the broader state of ceramic art in Cuba. By contributing to academic discussions and sharing his experiences, Carlos has played a vital role in fostering a deeper understanding of ceramic art and its cultural context.

== Bibliography ==
- Alberdi, Virginia: “Otro Carlos Enrique: retrato de un artista adolescente”, revista Artecubano, No. 2, La Habana, 1995, pp. 42–45.
- Alberdi, Virginia: “Ni inocente ni neutral”, Granma newspaper, No 207 – año 41, La Habana, miércoles 31 de agosto de 2005.
- Alberdi, Virginia: “Carlos Enrique Prado: Ni inocente ni neutral”, Cubarte, portal de la cultura cubana. Noticias, 3 de septiembre de 2005.
- Alonso, Alejandro G.: The Collection of the National Museum of Contemporary Cuban Ceramics. Ediciones Boloña. ISBN 978-959-294-235-6, La Habana, 2020, pp. 12, 20, 22, 28, 176, 177.
- Alonso, Alejandro G.: Todo para llevar (cat.), Galería Galiano, La Habana, agosto, 2006.
- Alonso, Alejandro G.: Re-visiones (cat.), Museo Nacional de la Cerámica, La Habana, 2006.
- Alonso, Alejandro G.: “X Bienal de Cerámica” (Una exposición personal), revista Artecubano, No 2, La Habana, 2010, pp 53.
- "Arte Cubano Contemporaneo. Coleccion del Consejo Nacional de Artes Plasticas", ArteCubano Ediciones ISBN 978-959-7229-09-4, La Habana 2014, pg 266–267.
- Barreto, Emilio: “Prado transfigurado”, revista Cartelera Cultural, no. 64, La Habana, 1996.
- Branscome, Jeff: “From Cuba to US: Clay connection”. The Free Lance-Star newspaper, Fredericksburg City, VA, USA. August 4, 2011.
- Calvo, Onedys: “El ceramista escultor: Carlos Enrique, el artista”, revista Revolución y Cultura, no. 5–6, año 2009, pp. 59–65
- Castellanos, Israel: “La taza sanitaria emplaza”, revista digital La Jiribilla, No 223, La Habana 2005.
- "Hands on Clay: The Fine Art Ceramic Center + MoCAA Collaboration 2020 - 2025", Museum of Contemporary Art of the Americas, ISBN 979-8303927377, Miami, Florida, 2024.
- Jubrias, Maria Elena: La Ceramica Cubana, entre el moderno y el posmoderno. [The Cuban Ceramics, Between Modern and Postmodern.] (in Spanish). Ediciones Boloña. ISBN 978-959-294-067-3, La Habana, 2017, pp. 101, 106, 107, 135, 137, 150.
- Lopez, Odette: Tautologies: Carlos Enrique Prado. Kendall Art Cultural Center. ISBN 979-8836806415. Miami, FL, 2022.
- Lopez, Odette: “Classical Columns, Stacks, and Piles.” Ceramics Now digital magazine, ceramicsnow.org, July 2, 2022.
- Lopez, Odette: “Tautologies: Carlos Enrique Prado.” Artepoli magazine. ISSN – Versión Impresa: 2385 – 7919. Spain, 2022. (in Spanish).
- Miami Unveils a Statue in Honor of Former President Ronald Reagan. The Sun Post News, Miami, April 16, 2018.
- Montoya, Kelly: “Students sculptures are a reflection of themselves.” The News@TheU. The University of Miami, FL, October 26, 2020.
- Noceda Fernández, José Manuel: “Carlos Enrique Prado: con un mirar diferente”, revista La Gaceta de Cuba, no. 3, La Habana, mayo-junio, 2006, pp. 46–48.
- Noceda Fernández, José Manuel: “Carlos Enrique Prado: La ritualidad del objeto”, Otra forma más de mirar lo mismo (cat.), Centro Cultural ICAIC, La Habana, julio, 2005.
- Padejka, Chiara: “Sculpting Stubborn: Carlos Enrique Prado Breaks the Mold”. CREATIVO online magazine. October 8, 2024.
- Pereira, María de los Ángeles: “Descubrir lo sublime”, Mírate el mundo de otra manera (cat.), Galería La Acacia, La Habana, junio, 2002.
- Pereira, María de los Ángeles: “Carlos Enrique, escultor”, revista Artecubano, no 2–3, La Habana, 2003, pp 48–51.
- Perez, Amanda M.: “Instructor sculpts the next generation of artists.” The News@TheU. The University of Miami, FL, January 27, 2022.
- Prado, Carlos: “Process”, Sights & Ceramics: Pittsburgh, Ceramics Monthly special NCECA Guide. Copyright @ 2018, The American Ceramic Society, All Rights Reserved. March 2018, pp 44, 43.
- Prado Herrera, Carlos Enrique: “Terapia Sanitaria. Apuntes colaterales”, revista Noticias de Artecubano, no 8 año 9, La Habana, agosto de 2008, pp 7.
- Prado Herrera, Carlos Enrique: Transfiguración (cat.), Centro de arte 23 y 12, La Habana, 1996.
- Prado Herrera, Carlos Enrique: Todo para llevar (cat.), Galería Galiano, La Habana, 2006.
- Reyes Cruz, Alain: “Aquí y allá. A propósito de la exposición personal Todo para llevar de Carlos Enrique Prado, en Galería Galiano”, revista Noticias de Artecubano, no 4 año 7, La Habana, septiembre-octubre de 2006, pp 3.
- Rodríguez, Dianelys: “Todo para llevar”, Portal San Cristóbal de La Habana. Sept de 2006.
- Sánchez Álvarez, Amalia: Almas en pena (cat.), Galería Galiano, La Habana, 1994.
- "Stubborn: Carlos Enrique Prado", Museum of Contemporary Art of the Americas, ISBN 979-8335457934, Miami, Florida, 2024. * Sweeten-Shults, Lana: “MSU resident artist: Torsos’ Travelers”. Times Record News newspaper. Wichita Falls, Texas. April 8, 2012.
- Tejeda, Marcos: "Miami unveils a statue in honor of former president Ronald Reagan". The Sun Post News, Miami, Florida, USA, (2018-04-16).
- Timpano, Nathan J.: “Of Anatomy and Corruption: Carlos Enrique Prado’s Stubborn and Cabeza Dura Series.” Ceramics Now digital magazine, 2024.
- Timpano, Nathan J.: “Carlos Enrique Prado. De Anatomía y Corrupción.” Artepoli magazine, No XLII - Verano, 2024. ISSN-2385-7919 (printed) / ISSN-2385-7927 (digital). Barcelona, Spain, 2024, pp. 4-6 (in Spanish).
- Vasallo, María del Carmen: “Todo para llevar”, portal web Cubasí.cu, 28-08-2006.
- Veigas Zamora, José: “La escultura en Cuba. Siglo XX”, Fundación Caguayo y Editorial Oriente ISBN 978-959-11-0425-0, Santiago de Cuba, 2005, pp. 346–348.
- Williams, Ashley A: “University fine arts students display work at a local gallery.” The News@TheU. The University of Miami, FL, June 22, 2022.
