= Iliturgi CF =

Iliturgi
- Full name: Iliturgi Club de Fútbol
- Founded: 1974
- Dissolved: 1994
- Ground: Santa Úrsula; Andújar, Jaén, Andalusia, Spain
- Capacity: 1,000
- 1993–94: 3ª – Group 9, 20th of 20
Home colours

Iliturgi Club de Fútbol was a Spanish football team based in Andújar, Jaén, in the autonomous community of Andalusia. Founded in 1974 and dissolved in 1994, they played in the Tercera División for 13 seasons, and held home matches at Campo Municipal de Fútbol Santa Úrsula, with a capacity of 1,000 people.

== History ==
Founded in 1974 as a replacement to dissolved CD Iliturgi, Iliturgi CF first reached the Tercera División in 1977, playing in the category for two seasons before suffering relegation in 1979. They returned to the fourth tier at first attempt, and played for six consecutive seasons in the division four before dropping a level in 1986.

Iliturgi returned to the fourth division in 1987, but suffered immediate relegation. After two seasons in the Regional Preferente, the club returned to Tercera in 1990, but suffered relegation in 1994 after finishing in the last position of their group. Shortly after, the club was dissolved, and CD Iliturgi returned to an active status.

== Season to season ==
Season	Tier	Division	Place	Copa del Rey
1975–76	5	1ª Reg.	1st	
1976–77	4	Reg. Pref.	6th	
1977–78	4	3ª	10th	
1978–79	4	3ª	20th	
1979–80	5	Reg. Pref.	12th	
1980–81	4	3ª	11th	
1981–82	4	3ª	17th	
1982–83	4	3ª	16th	
1983–84	4	3ª	6th	
1984–85	4	3ª	7th	Second round

Season	Tier	Division	Place	Copa del Rey
1985–86	4	3ª	18th	
1986–87	5	Reg. Pref.	1st	
1987–88	4	3ª	21st	
1988–89	5	Reg. Pref.	5th	
1989–90	5	Reg. Pref.	1st	
1990–91	4	3ª	7th	
1991–92	4	3ª	3rd	First round
1992–93	4	3ª	8th	First round
1993–94	4	3ª	20th	

- 13 seasons in Tercera División
