= Abel Herrero (artist) =

Cuban born artist based in Tuscany, Italy (born 1971)

Abel Herrero (born 1971) is a Cuban artist, known for painting, sculpture, photography, and installation art. He is based in Tuscany, Italy.

== Biography ==
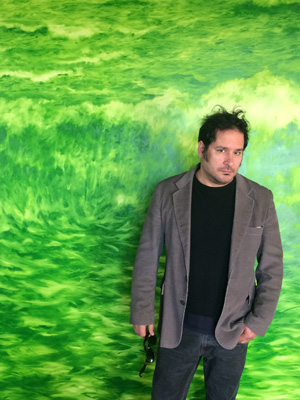
Abel Herrero, 2017

Herrero was born in 1971 in Havana. In Cuba he began studying art and had his first solo exhibitions in Havana.

In 1994, he moved to Milan, where he furthered his artistic career and started to pursue his research and studies of iconography and symbolic representation in European art. He established relationships with protagonists of the artistic and intellectual scene which continue to influence his progressive formation.

== Work ==
His artistic production ranges from paintings, sculptures and installations to photographies. Herrero's pictorical research moves in a borderline territory between figurative and not-figurative, where the chromatic element is elevated to being the conceptual content of the work. The production of his work takes place through fast gestural actions of subtraction of the pictorical material. The result has been described as a powerful, essential painting, free from any form of pompous rhetoric, where also the time needed for its creation plays a determining role in the constructive logic of the same.

He embraces Majakovsky’s thesis of economy in art as a fundamental aesthetic principle. During the last few years he has dedicated particular attention to the concept of Osservatorio and the relationship between humans and their natural environment.

He has been living in the Tuscan countryside since 2010 where he commenced his research on landscape connected to the concept of saturation.

"That the image today is charged with the responsibility of reinforcing and conveying meaning of interpretation of the world and its values, places artists under the obligation to release it from this duty, saving it from the abyss of boredom and disenchantment". Abel Herrero

In 2006 in Cuba he founded the project Guest Thinkers: meetings and discussions between the guests and the Cuban Institutions. Amongst those invited were Claudio Parmiggiani, Gianni Vattimo, Emanuele Severino, Bruno Corà, Jannis Kounellis.
