= La Herrera =

Coordinates: 38°58′00″N 2°07′00″W

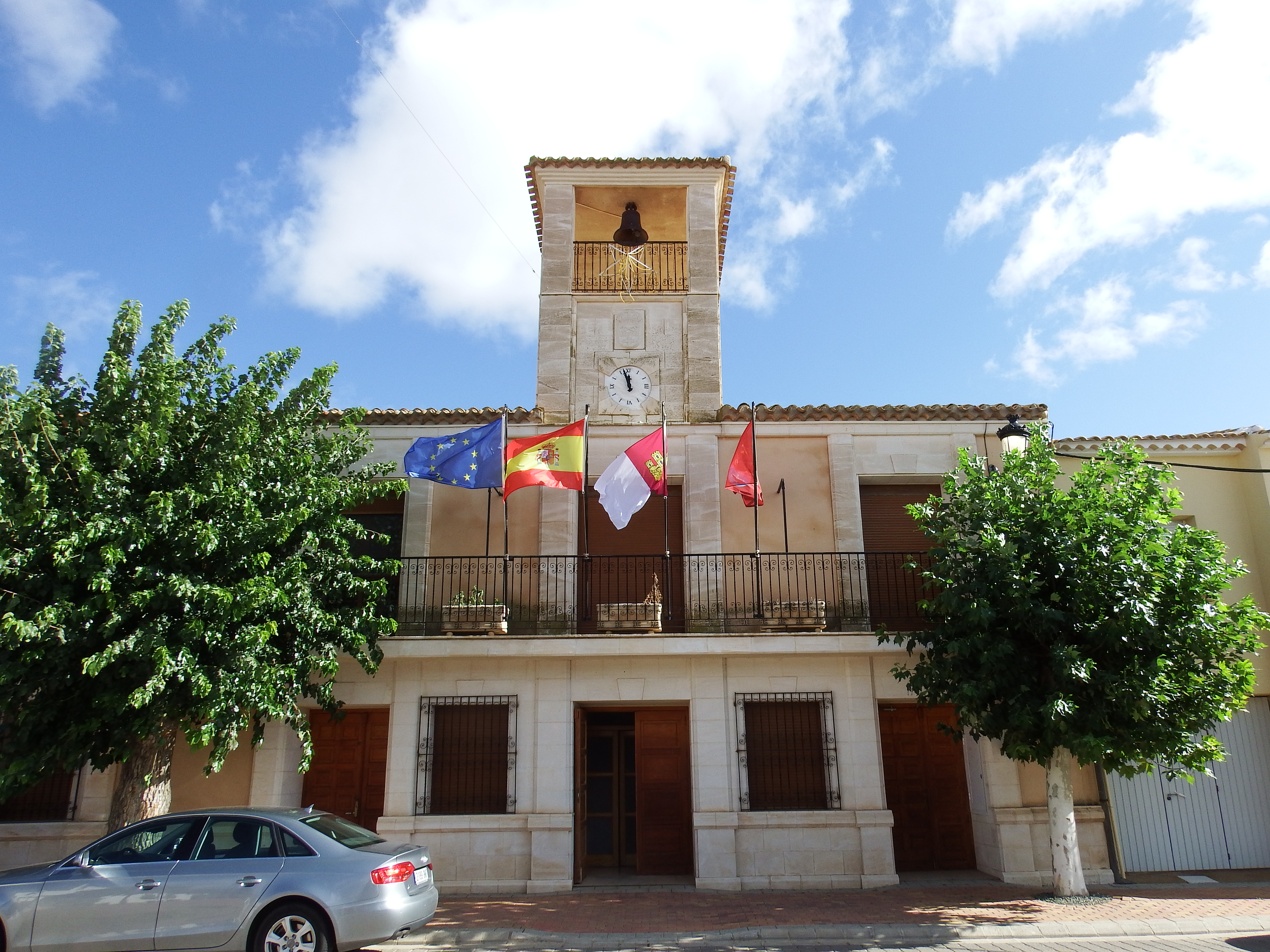
Town hall

La Herrera is a municipality in Albacete, Castile-La Mancha, Spain. It has a population of 307 as of 2023.
