= Herrera, Entre Ríos =

Herrera (Entre Ríos)
- Municipality and village
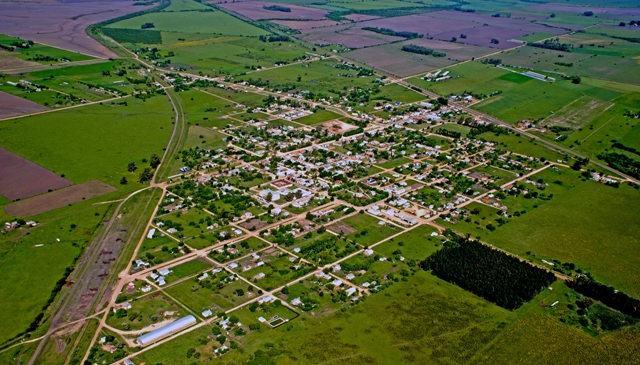

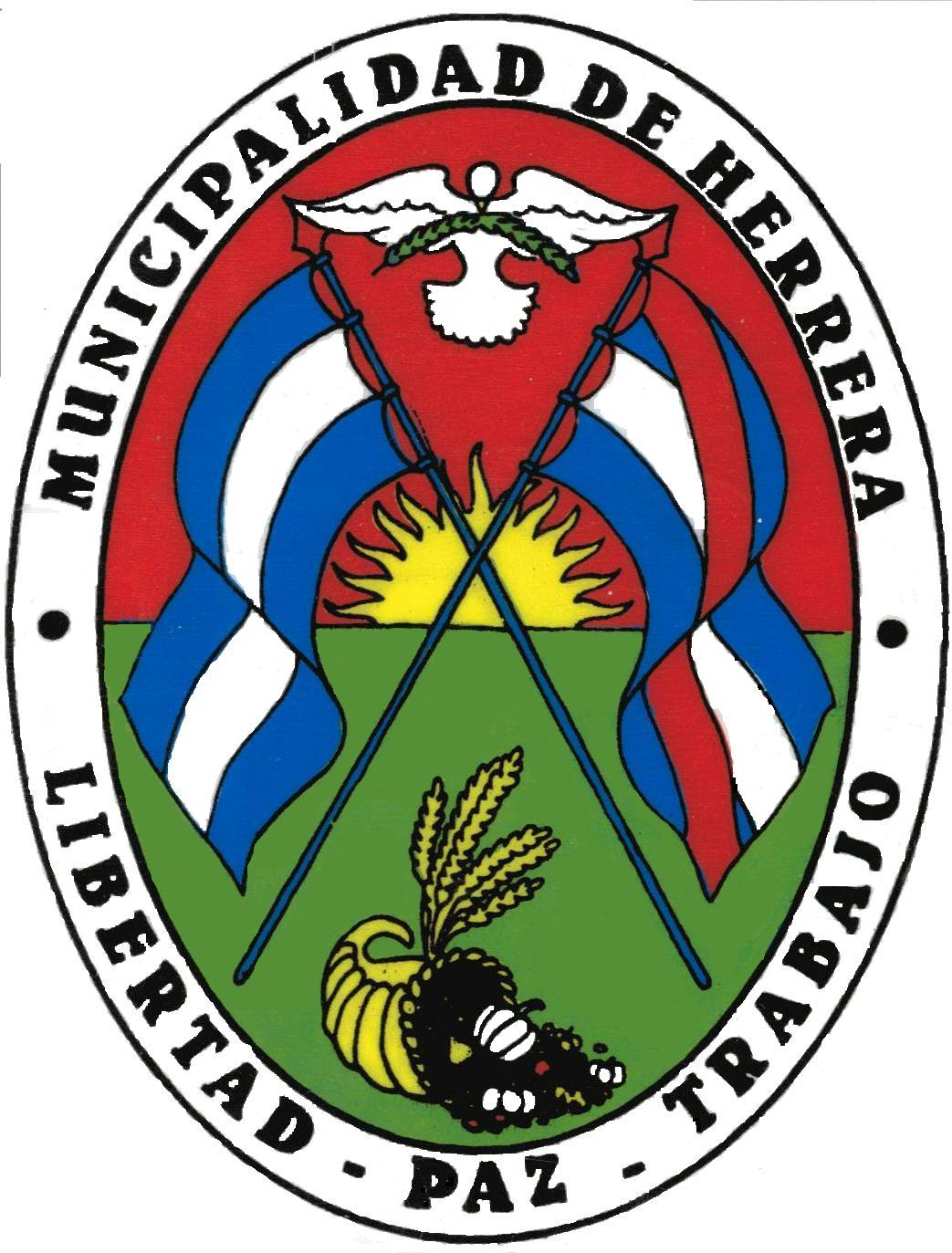
- Seal

- Location within Argentina
- Coordinates: 32°26′S 58°38′W
- Country: Argentina
- Province: Entre Ríos

Government
  - Leaders: Carlos Curuchet

Population (2010)
  - Total: 1,767
- Time zone: UTC−3 (ART)

Herrera (Entre Ríos) is a municipality in the Gená district of the Uruguay department in the province of Entre Ríos in north-eastern Argentina. The municipality includes the locality of the same name - also known as Villa San Miguel - and a rural area. Its railway station is called Nicolás Herrera.
