= Manolo Herrero (footballer, born 1967) =

Spanish footballer and coach

Personal information
- Full name: Manuel Herrero Maestre
- Date of birth: 10 October 1967 (age 59)
- Place of birth: Villena, Spain
- Height: 1.78 m (5 ft 10 in)
- Position: Midfielder

Youth career
- Villena

Senior career*
Years	Team	Apps	(Gls)
1984–1985	Villena		
1985–1986	Murcia B		
1986–1989	Murcia	47	(0)
1989–1991	Sevilla	36	(1)
1991–1994	Castellón	71	(2)
1994–1996	Levante	63	(2)
1996–1997	Gandía	29	(0)
1997–1998	Eldense		
1998–1999	Ontinyent	31	(0)
2000	Eldense		
2000–2001	Pinoso		
2001–2002	Jumilla		

Managerial career
- 2002–2003: Palamós
- 2004–2005: Elche B
- 2005–2006: Villajoyosa
- 2006: Alcoyano
- 2008–2009: Eldense
- 2009–2010: Villajoyosa
- 2010–2011: Alzira
- * Club domestic league appearances and goals

Manuel 'Manolo' Herrero Maestre (born 10 October 1967) is a Spanish retired footballer who played as a midfielder, and a current coach.

== Playing career ==
Born in Villena, Province of Alicante, Herrero played five consecutive seasons in La Liga, starting with Real Murcia then spending two years with Sevilla FC. His best input in the top division was 24 games in 1987–88, helping the former team narrowly avoid relegation after finishing 17th.

After three campaigns in the second division with CD Castellón, Herrero played the rest of his career in the lower leagues, retiring in June 2002 with Jumilla CF at the age of nearly 35.

== Managing career ==
Immediately after retiring, Herrero begun his coaching career, starting with Palamós CF in the third level. In the following years he worked exclusively in the lower divisions and in his native Valencian Community, being in charge of Elche CF Ilicitano, Villajoyosa CF (two spells), CD Alcoyano, CD Eldense and UD Alzira.

In the 2011–12 season, Herrero was Alicante CF's director of football, as the division four club was overwhelmed with financial difficulties.
