= Victor Manuel Velasco Herrera =

- Scientific career
- Fields: Physics
- Institutions: National Autonomous University of Mexico

Victor Manuel Velasco Herrera is a theoretical physicist and researcher at the Institute of Geophysics of the National Autonomous University of Mexico (UNAM). He rejects the scientific consensus on climate change, claiming that the IPCC ignores solar activity, which he considers the most important factor. In the summer of 2008, he predicted the world would "soon" enter a little ice age.
