= Juan Bautista Gill =

President of Paraguay (1840–1877)

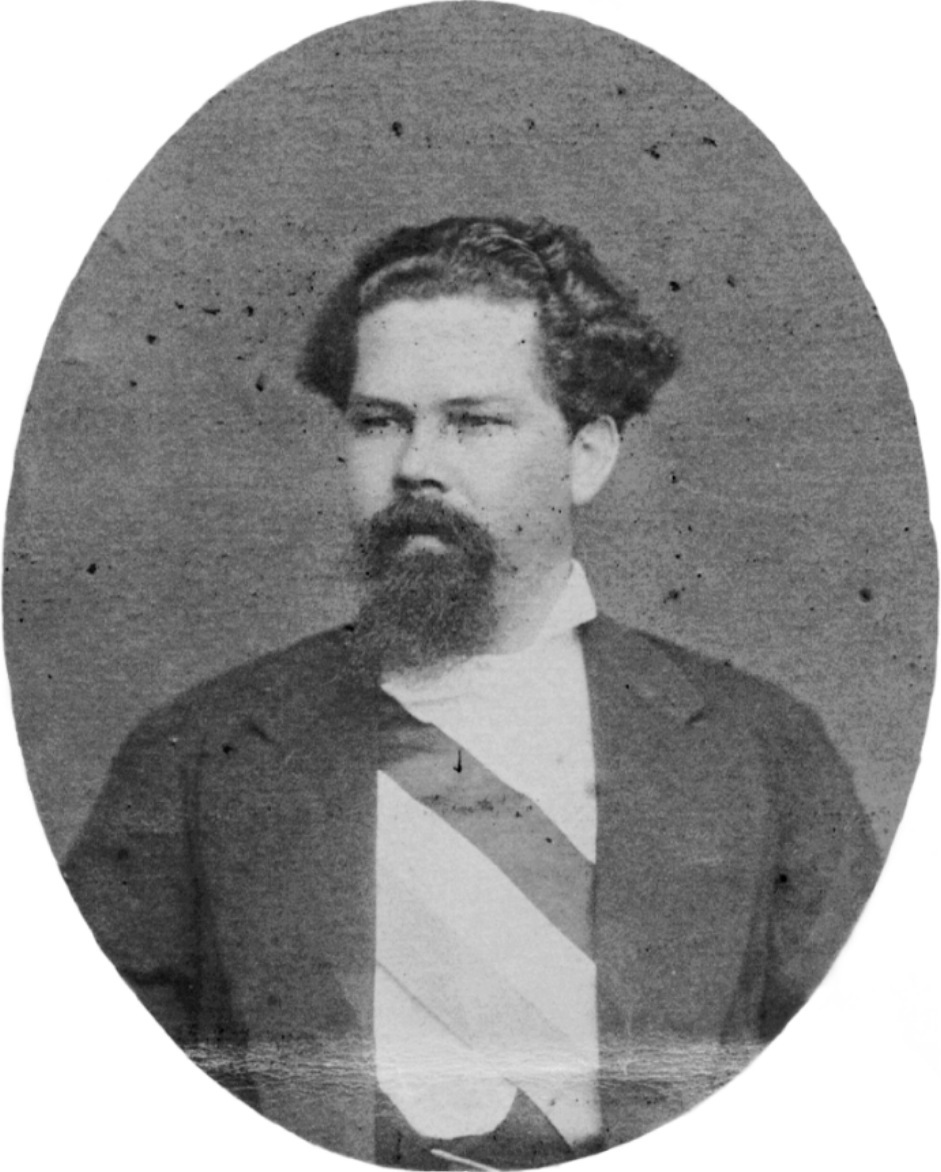
- Portrait, 1874

6th President of Paraguay
- In office November 25, 1874 – April 12, 1877
- Vice President: Higinio Uriarte
- Preceded by: Salvador Jovellanos
- Succeeded by: Higinio Uriarte

Personal details
- Born: October 28, 1840 Asunción, Paraguay
- Died: April 12, 1877 (aged 36) Villarrica, Paraguay
- Spouse: María Concepción Díaz de Bedoya
- Parents: Juan Andrés Gill Noguera (father); María del Barrio Díaz de Bedoya García de los Ríos Valiente (mother)

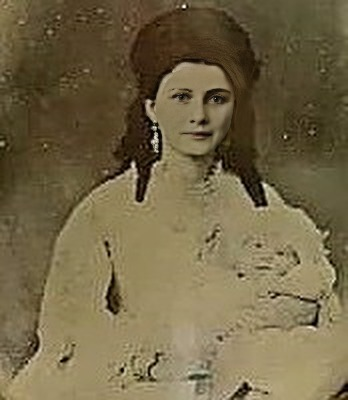
Portrait of 6th Paraguayan First Lady, Concepción Díaz de Bedoya Aguilera

Juan Bautista Gill García (Juan Bautista Gill Garcia del Barrio) (October 28, 1840 – April 12, 1877) was President of Paraguay from November 25, 1874 until his assassination on April 12, 1877 by Juan Silvano Godoi and Major Jose Dolores Molas.

He was the only Paraguayan President to be assassinated while in office.

== Personal life ==
He was born in Asunción into a prominent family of Juan Andres Gill and Escolástica Garcia del Barrio y Bedoya. He was the grandson of Don Juan Miguel Gill, one of the founding fathers of Paraguayan Independence and a member of the Cabildo, who had Celtic blood. He was married to Maria Concepcion Diaz de Bedoya. His paternal ancestor, John Thomas [El inglés] McGill (Tomas McGill) was born in Ireland and migrated to Latin America with his brother. The family shortened the surname to Gill when dictator José Gaspar Rodríguez de Francia decreed that prefixes in foreign names should not be used anymore

In 1854 he traveled to Buenos Aires, Argentina where he pursued secondary education and medical training, which he did not complete. He returned to Paraguay in 1863. When the Paraguayan War was declared against Argentina, he enlisted in the 40th battalion, which comprised young men of high social position. Because of his knowledge of medicine, he was appointed to the military health division and served as a medical orderly. Gill was captured in the last days of December 1868 after the Battle of Lomas Valentinas. In mid-January 1869 Gill was among those who returned to Asunción, where the Allies freed him and others on condition that they would not join the army again.

== Political career ==
On January 25, 1869 Gill participated in a meeting convened by Don Serapio Machain to petition Allied occupational forces for the establishment of a provisional government. Among those who attended that meeting were José Segundo Decoud, Cayo Miltos, Carlos Loizaga, Juan Antonio Jara and Salvador Jovellanos, all of whom would soon assume high governmental posts. Gill was a supporter of Brazilian interests and counted on their military support during the political struggles. As such, he was in favor of signing the Loizaga – Cotegipe Treaty with Brazil.

He was Minister of Finance of Paraguay from 1870 to 1871, and President of the Senate in 1872. Gill was accused of misusing funds, and dismissed by the Senate in March 1872. In response Cirilo Antonio Rivarola dissolved the Congress but instead was himself forced to resign. The removal of Rivarola was organized by Gill in cooperation with Brazilians who wanted to place him in Presidency. However, with the support of General Benigno Ferreira it was Salvador Jovellanos who became the President. Before he could remove Jovellanos, Gill was arrested on the orders of General Ferreira and deported from the country.

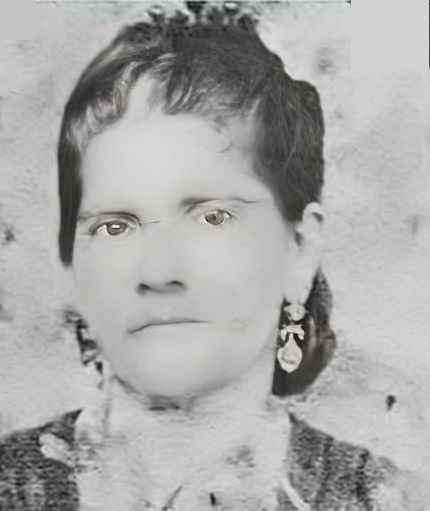
Portrait of María Díaz de Bedoya García, mother of 6th Paraguayan President, Juan Bautista Gill García

== Presidency ==
Jovellanos was forced from power after a rebellion started in 1874 under nationalist General Bernardino Caballero and Candido Barreiro. Gill was Minister of Finance of Paraguay from February 1874 to November 1874. He finally became the President between November 25, 1874 and April 12, 1877. His cousin Jose Higinio Uriarte y Garcia del Barrio served as Vice President and after Gill' s assassination served as President for the remainder of his term. His cabinet comprised Emilio Gill and Adolfo Saguier serving as Secretaries of Finance; Germán Serrano and Jose Urdapilleta, as Secretaries of the Interior; Bernardino Caballero and Benjamin Aceval, as Secretaries of Justice, Culture and Public Education; Patricio Escobar, Secretary of War and the Navy; and Facundo Machaín and Benjamin Aceval, as Secretaries of Foreign Affairs, and for some time Candido Bareiro as Finance Minister.

During his government he introduced paper currency, created the National College in the Capital and significantly increased taxes; the Civil Code of Argentina was adopted.

In order to stabilize the national economy, Gill established the Tobacco Monopoly through the April 22, 1875 law. The government took charge of the tobacco export for five years, prohibiting individuals from exporting or importing tobacco products. The same law was later enforced on the soap and salt trade for a period of three years.

Gill opposed the 1875 Sosa–Tejedor Treaty which would have accepted Argentinian claims to Chaco. On February 3, 1876, a treaty on boundaries, peace, trade and navigation was finally signed with Argentina. Foreign minister Facundo Machaín negotiated and signed the Machaín-Irigoyen Treaty with Argentine Minister Bernardo de Irigoyen under which Paraguay officially ceded Misiones Province, the southern part of the Paraná River and part of Gran Chaco territory, while keeping most of Gran Chaco. It also made possible the removal of Allied occupation forces from Paraguay by July 3, 1876.

Gill's government, like that of his predecessors, was not spared revolutionary movements. A revolt broke out in Caacupé in December 1875 led by General Serrano, his former Minister of Interior. The insurrection was supported by Brazilian forces and quelled after the death of Serrano and other rebels.

== Assassination ==
Internal political instability led to a plot by Juan Silvano Godoi to assassinate Gill. On April 12, 1877 at about 10 in the morning Gill was travelling in the company of his two edecanes (high-ranking officers), down the Villarrica street (currently President Franco str.). While crossing the Independencia Nacional, he was shot by three gunmen and died instantly. Among assassins were Nicanor Silvano Godoi (brother to Juan Silvano Godoi) and two others - Molas and Goiburu. Later in the day Gill's brother, General Emilio Gill was also killed.

Juan Silvano Godoi escaped to Argentina from which he returned only in 1895 and was appointed director of the National Library of Paraguay. Godoi had planned that his actions would lead to the restoration of President Rivarola the office. Instead it led to arrest and murder of Facundo Machaín and other suspects.

The Colombian poet Dr. Prospero Pereira Gamba (1830–1896), who lived in Argentina as an exile, reflected on this tragic moment experienced by the President in his work "The Spectre".

Political offices
Preceded by Salvador Jovellanos	President of Paraguay; 1874–1877	Succeeded by Higinio Uriarte
