= La Regeneración (Paraguay) =

Defunct Paraguayan newspaper

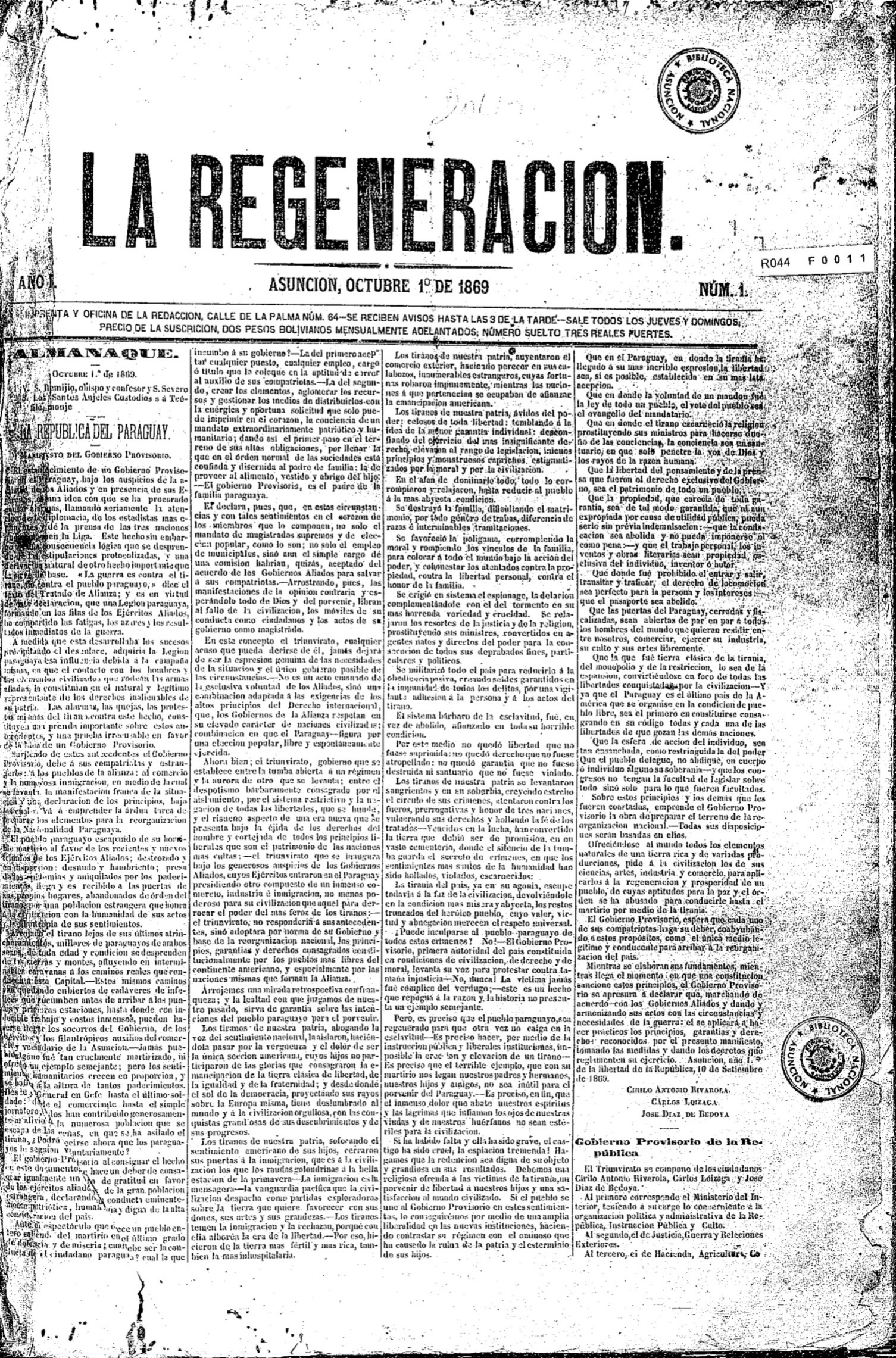
- First page of La Regeneración's first edition
- Type: Newspaper
- Founded: October 1, 1869
- Ceased publication: September 23, 1870
- Political alignment: Liberal
- City: Asunción
- Country: Paraguay

La Regeneración was a liberal periodical published in Paraguay by the brothers José Segundo Decoud, Juan José Decoud and Adolfo Decoud, along with Facundo Machaín. It was Paraguay's first wholly private newspaper, funded primarily by returning exiles from Argentina in the aftermath of the Triple Alliance War, such as Juan Francisco Decoud. It ran only briefly, between the end of 1869 and 1870, closing when its office in Asunción was raided by a group of the city's Italian community, due to the publication of a news article which falsely attributed a murder to an Italian man, but had disproportionate importance on the country's politics in the postwar era.

== History ==
La Regeneración was Paraguay's first wholly privately owned newspaper, founded in the 1st of October 1869, while the Triple Alliance War still raged in the country's interior and Asunción, the capital, was under allied military occupation.

Written by young liberals, the diary was an important piece in the country's political disputes as rival power blocks coalesced, one led by Candido Bareiro centered amongst former prisoners of war and functionaries of the López regime, and the other by the Decouds, mainly José Segundo, built on members of the Paraguayan Legion and others who had been in exile during the López years.

The 1870 Constitution's original project was first shown publicly through La Regeneración, probably a consequence of José Segundo's importance in drafting it and his key role with the newspaper. The provisional government's official acts were also published in it, until the 1st of September 1870, when Facundo Machaín, one of the diary's contributors, was named president by the Constitutional Assembly, but soon afterwards toppled by Cirilo Antonio Rivarola, aided by the Brazilian occupation forces. After this event, the diary took up opposition to the government, which tried to censor it.

=== Riots and closure ===
On the 18th of September, a news article was published blaming an Italian man for the brutal murder of a woman in the port district of Asunción. Over the next few days, it was discovered that the murderer was in truth an Argentinian man, leaving the city's Italian community enraged. A few days later, a crowd of between 200 and 250 was formed and marched towards the newspaper's building, armed with handguns and knives. The police arrived too late to keep the mob from trashing the building and fighting its workers. The police chief, Rufino Taboada, was a political enemy of the Decouds. When the police did arrive, however, they fired a volley at the mob, and then charged them with bayonets drawn.

The riot's aftermath was that most of the press's materials were destroyed, some of it set on fire and some of it thrown out the building's windows. Two workers, one from Brazil and another from Uruguay, were killed, and two more were wounded. Amongst the rioters, three were killed and many others wounded by the police. A policeman also lost his life. At the end of the day, close to 200 Italians had been arrested, and at least 20 killed, as the police cracked down on the Italian community and searched their homes. The Argentine occupation commander's nephew also was killed.

Segundo Decoud received an offer from president Rivarola to use rival newspaper El Paraguay's press while theirs was rebuilt, but the proposal was declined. The paper's eventual successor was called La Opinión Pública.

== Editorial ==
La Regeneración was led mostly by young émigrés, recently returned from Argentina and elsewhere, heavily influenced by the liberalism of the time and by its Argentinian exponents, such as Domingo Sarmiento and Juan Bautista Alberdi. Amongst those who wrote for the newspaper there were heavyweight political figures such as Facundo Machaín, Benigno Ferreira, Juan Silvano Godoi, a single woman, Asunción Escalada, and the Decouds, Juan José, Adolfo and José Segundo.

The paper's editorials and opinion pieces were centered on opposition to the Bareiro bloc and to the López regime, even after the Triple Alliance War ended with the Battle of Cerro Corá. They also were friendly to Argentina rather than Brazil. The diary positioned itself in favor of political, economical and individual liberty, a secular State, European and North American immigration, and the separation of powers. It also was anti-jesuitic.

Also of note was its opposition to the continued allied occupation of Asunción after the end of the Paraguayan War, seeing it as a threat to the country's electoral liberties.
