= Vice President of Paraguay =

Political position

Vice President of the Republic of Paraguay
- Vicepresidente de la República del Paraguay (Spanish); Paraguái Ombuekoviáva (Guarani)
- Coat of arms of Paraguay

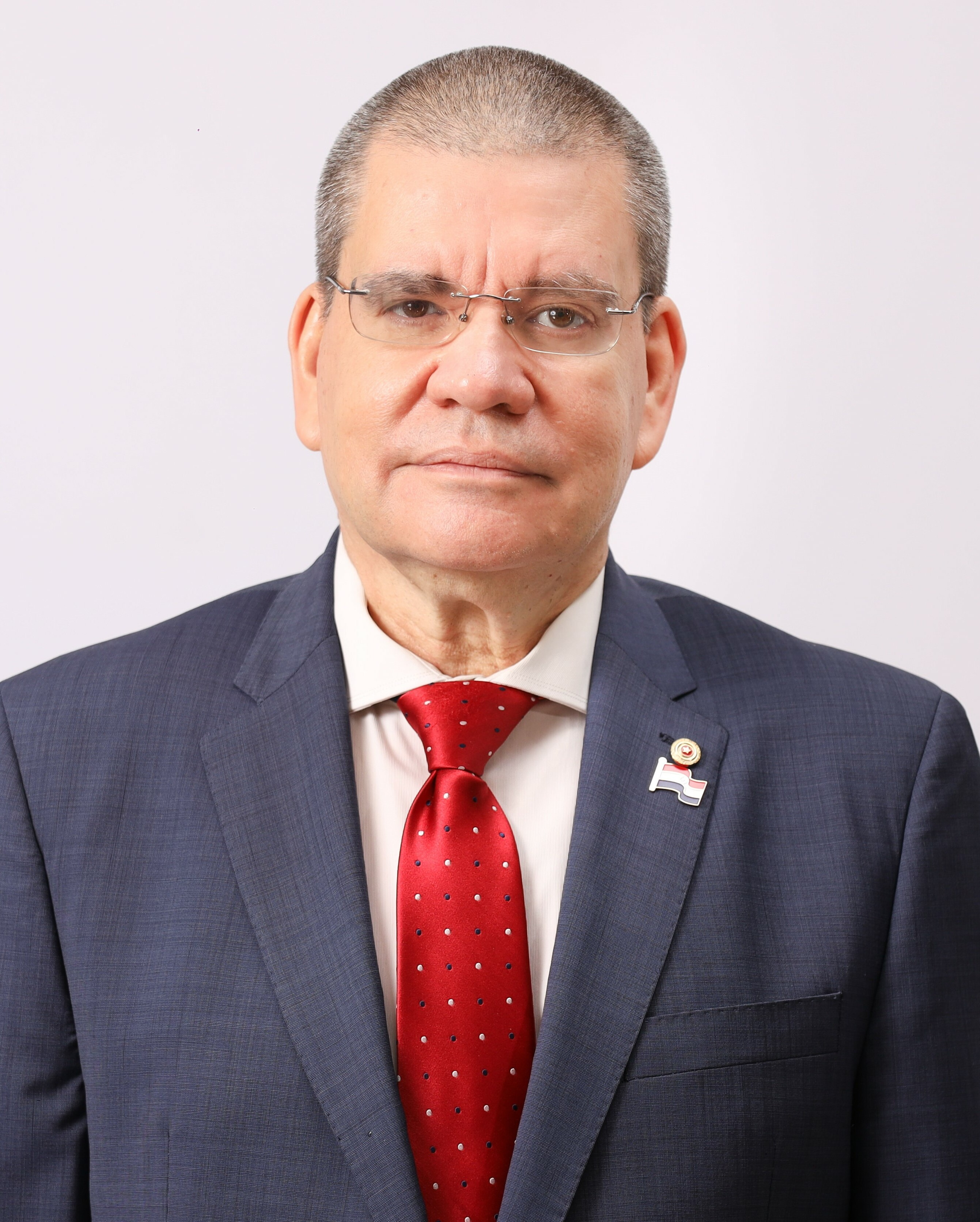
- Incumbent; Antonio Barrios since 6 November 2026
- Style: Excelentísimo/a Señor/a
- Residence: None
- Seat: Palacio de los López
- Term length: Five years, non-renewable
- Inaugural holder: Mariano González
- Formation: 13 March 1844
- Website: www.presidencia.gov.py

The vice president of Paraguay is the person with the second highest position in the executive branch of the Paraguayan government, after the president of Paraguay. The position of vice president was created with the Constitution of 1844, although it was the title given to ex officio members temporarily replacing the elected president in case of death or absence, and was not a position elected alongside the president.

The Constitution of 1870 established the position with a permanent character, requiring election alongside the president and assigning to it the presidency of the National Congress and of the Senate.

The position disappeared between 1940 and 1993, as the Constitutions of 1940 and 1967 abolished it. Only in 1992, with the new National Constitution, the position of vice president was reinstalled within the political institutional scheme of Paraguay.

The vice president serves a five-year term, running on the same ticket as the president. He is not eligible for reelection. A vice president may run for president, provided that he leaves office at least six months before election day.

== List of vice presidents of Paraguay ==
=== As acting president (1844–1870) ===
No.	Portrait	Name (Birth–Death)	Term of office		President	Notes
No.	Portrait	Name (Birth–Death)	Start	End	President	Notes
–		Mariano González (?–?)	1845	1846	Carlos Antonio López	Vice president during the absence of President Carlos Antonio López, who toured the interior of the country for almost a year.
–		Francisco Solano López (1827–1870)	10 September 1862	16 October 1862	Himself	Assumed the vice presidency after the death of his father, Carlos Antonio López. Elected as president by the Congress.
–		Domingo Francisco Sánchez (1795–1870)	25 May 1865	1 March 1870	Francisco Solano López	Acting president as Francisco Solano López commanded the army in the Paraguayan War. Killed in the Battle of Cerro Corá.

=== As permanent position (1870–present) ===
No.	Portrait	Name (Birth–Death)	Term of office		Party	Election	President	Notes
No.	Portrait	Name (Birth–Death)	Start	End	Party	Election	President	Notes
1		Cayo Miltos (1843–1871)	25 November 1870	7 January 1871	—	1870	Cirilo Antonio Rivarola	Died in office.
Vacant; 7 January 1871 – 9 December 1871							Cirilo Antonio Rivarola	
2		Salvador Jovellanos (1833–1881)	9 December 1871	18 December 1871	—	—	Cirilo Antonio Rivarola	Appointed by the Congress. Assumed the presidency after the resignation of Cirilo Antonio Rivarola.
Vacant; 18 December 1871 – 25 November 1874							Salvador Jovellanos	
3		Higinio Uriarte (1843–1909)	25 November 1874	12 April 1877	—	1874	Juan Bautista Gill	Assumed the presidency after the assassination of Juan Bautista Gill.
Vacant; 12 April 1877 – 25 November 1878							Higinio Uriarte	
4		Adolfo Saguier (1832–1902)	25 November 1878	4 September 1880	—	1878	Cándido Bareiro	Ousted from office by a coup d'état.
Vacant; 4 September 1880 – 25 November 1882							Bernardino Caballero	
5		Juan Antonio Jara (1845–1887)	25 November 1882	25 November 1886	—	1882	Bernardino Caballero	
6		José del Rosario Miranda (1832–1903)	25 November 1886	25 November 1890	ANR–Colorado	1886	Patricio Escobar	
7		Marcos Morínigo (1848–1901)	25 November 1890	9 June 1894	ANR–Colorado	1890	Juan Gualberto González	Assumed the presidency after the forced resignation of Juan Gualberto González.
Vacant; 9 June 1894 – 25 November 1894							Marcos Morínigo	
8		Facundo Ynsfrán (1860–1902)	25 November 1894	25 November 1898	ANR–Colorado	1894	Juan Bautista Egusquiza	
9		Andrés Héctor Carvallo (1862–1934)	25 November 1898	9 January 1902	ANR–Colorado	1898	Emilio Aceval	Assumed the presidency after the forced resignation of Emilio Aceval.
Vacant; 9 January 1902 – 25 November 1902							Andrés Héctor Carvallo	
10		Manuel Domínguez (1868–1935)	25 November 1902	19 December 1904	ANR–Colorado	1902	Juan Antonio Escurra	Ousted from office by a coup d'état.
Vacant; 19 December 1904 – 25 November 1906							Gaona	
Vacant; 19 December 1904 – 25 November 1906							Báez	
11		Emiliano González Navero (1861–1934)	25 November 1906	4 July 1908	Liberal	1906	Benigno Ferreira	Assumed the presidency after Benigno Ferreira was deposed in a coup d'état.
Vacant; 4 July 1908 – 25 November 1910							Emiliano González Navero	
12		Juan Bautista Gaona (1845–1932)	25 November 1910	17 January 1911	Liberal	1910	Manuel Gondra	Ousted from office by a coup d'état.
Vacant; 17 January 1911 – 15 August 1912							Jara	
Vacant; 17 January 1911 – 15 August 1912							Rojas	
Vacant; 17 January 1911 – 15 August 1912							Peña	
Vacant; 17 January 1911 – 15 August 1912							González Navero	
13		Pedro Bobadilla (1858–?)	15 August 1912	15 August 1916	Liberal	1912	Eduardo Schaerer	
14		José Pedro Montero (1878–1927)	15 August 1916	5 June 1919	Liberal	1916	Manuel Franco	Assumed the presidency after the death of Manuel Franco.
Vacant; 5 June 1919 – 15 August 1920							José Pedro Montero	
15		Félix Paiva (1877–1965)	15 August 1920	29 October 1921	Liberal	1920	Manuel Gondra	Assumed the presidency after the resignation of Manuel Gondra.
Vacant; 29 October 1921 – 15 August 1924							Paiva	
Vacant; 29 October 1921 – 15 August 1924							Eusebio Ayala	
Vacant; 29 October 1921 – 15 August 1924							Eligio Ayala	
Vacant; 29 October 1921 – 15 August 1924							Riart	
16		Manuel Burgos (1871–1947)	15 August 1924	15 August 1928	Liberal	1924	Eligio Ayala	
17		Emiliano González Navero (1861–1934)	15 August 1928	25 October 1931	Liberal	1928	José Patricio Guggiari	Assumed the presidency after José Patricio Guggiari resigned to stand an impeachment.
Vacant; 25 October 1931 – 27 January 1932							Emiliano González Navero	
18		Emiliano González Navero (1861–1934)	27 January 1932	15 August 1932	Liberal	—	José Patricio Guggiari	Restoration of its original mandate after José Patricio Guggiari was absolved from impeachment.
19		Raúl Casal Ribeiro (1887–1952)	15 August 1932	17 February 1936	Liberal	1932	Eusebio Ayala	Deposed after the Febrerista Revolution.
Vacant; 17 February 1936 – 15 August 1939							Franco	
Vacant; 17 February 1936 – 15 August 1939							Paiva	
20		Luis Alberto Riart (1880–1953)	15 August 1939	18 February 1940	Liberal	1939	José Félix Estigarribia	Ousted from office by a self-coup of José Félix Estigarribia.
Vacant; 18 February 1940 – 10 July 1940							José Félix Estigarribia	
Post abolished 10 July 1940 – 15 August 1993								
Post abolished 10 July 1940 – 15 August 1993							Morínigo	
Post abolished 10 July 1940 – 15 August 1993							Frutos	
Post abolished 10 July 1940 – 15 August 1993							González	
Post abolished 10 July 1940 – 15 August 1993							Rolón	
Post abolished 10 July 1940 – 15 August 1993							López	
Post abolished 10 July 1940 – 15 August 1993							Chaves	
Post abolished 10 July 1940 – 15 August 1993							Pereira	
Post abolished 10 July 1940 – 15 August 1993							Stroessner	
Post abolished 10 July 1940 – 15 August 1993							Rodríguez	
21		Ángel Seifart (1940–2018)	15 August 1993	15 August 1998	ANR–Colorado	1993	Juan Carlos Wasmosy	
22		Luis María Argaña (1932–1999)	15 August 1998	23 March 1999	ANR–Colorado	1998	Raúl Cubas	Assassinated.
Vacant; 23 March 1999 – 2 September 2000							Raúl Cubas	
Vacant; 23 March 1999 – 2 September 2000							Luis Ángel González Macchi	
23		Julio César Franco (1951–)	2 September 2000	16 October 2002	Authentic Radical Liberal	2000	Luis Ángel González Macchi	Resigned to run for presidency.
Vacant; 16 October 2002 – 15 August 2003							Luis Ángel González Macchi	
24		Luis Alberto Castiglioni (1962–)	15 August 2003	4 October 2007	ANR–Colorado	2003	Nicanor Duarte	Resigned to run for presidency.
Vacant; 4 October 2007 – 21 November 2007							Nicanor Duarte	
25		Francisco Oviedo (1956–)	21 November 2007	15 August 2008	ANR–Colorado	—	Nicanor Duarte	Appointed by the Congress.
26		Federico Franco (1962–)	15 August 2008	22 June 2012	Authentic Radical Liberal	2008	Fernando Lugo	Assumed the presidency after the impeachment of Fernando Lugo.
Vacant; 22 June 2012 – 27 June 2012							Federico Franco	
27		Óscar Denis (1946–)	27 June 2012	15 August 2013	Authentic Radical Liberal	—	Federico Franco	Appointed by the Congress.
28		Juan Afara (1960–)	15 August 2013	11 April 2018	ANR–Colorado	2013	Horacio Cartes	Resigned to run for senator.
Vacant; 11 April 2018 – 9 May 2018							Horacio Cartes	
29		Alicia Pucheta (1950–)	9 May 2018	15 August 2018	ANR–Colorado	—	Horacio Cartes	Appointed by the Congress.
30		Hugo Velázquez (1966–)	15 August 2018	15 August 2023	ANR–Colorado	2018	Mario Abdo Benítez	
31		Pedro Alliana (1974–)	15 August 2023	6 November 2026	ANR–Colorado	2023	Santiago Peña	Assumed the presidency after the impeachment of Santiago Peña
32		Antonio Barrios (1957–)	6 November 2026	Incumbent	ANR–Colorado	—	Pedro Alliana	Appointed by the Congress

== See also ==
- List of current vice presidents
