= Fabio Queirolo =

Paraguayan diplomat and physician

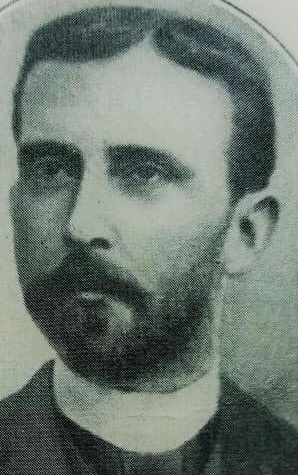

Minister of Foreign Affairs
- In office 12 March 1900 – 26 March 1901
- Preceded by: José Segundo Decoud
- Succeeded by: Guillermo de los Rios

Minister of the Paraguayan Supreme Court of Justice
- In office 22 April 1895 – 12 June 1895

Felipe Fabio Queirolo Larramendi (1861 – 23 November 1901) was a Paraguayan Minister of Foreign Affairs, journalist, and founding member of the traditional Liberal Party.

== Biography ==
=== Early life and studies ===
Queirolo was born in 1861 in Villarrica to Miguel Angel Queirolo, who was Italian, and Maria de los Dolores Larramendi, who was also from Villarrica.

=== Professional life ===
In 1887, he helped found the Liberal Party; in 1891, he was one of the leaders of a liberal revolt which was defeated in Asunción, in the aftermath of violence in the 1890 general election. In 1895, intrigues led to Benigno Ferreira stepping down and Queirolo taking the role of head of the party; in the same year, he briefly held a post at the Supreme Court of Justice of Paraguay.

In 1900, amidst a crisis provoked by political titan José Segundo Decoud's resignation from Emilio Aceval's cabinet and from the Colorado Party, he was given the role of Minister of Foreign Affairs by Aceval as a conciliatory measure. He resigned from the cabinet after controversies regarding the fairness of the 1901 Legislative Elections.

Around this time Queirolo was described by the resident Brazilian diplomat in Paraguay as a "cattle rancher who rarely appeared in Asunción". He had, however, been a journalist for most of his life before taking up the Ministry, and had returned to a newspaper called "El Cívico" after leaving that post.

He died on 23 November 1901, after a short illness.
