= Juan Silvano Godoi =

Paraguayan writer and librarian (1850–1926)

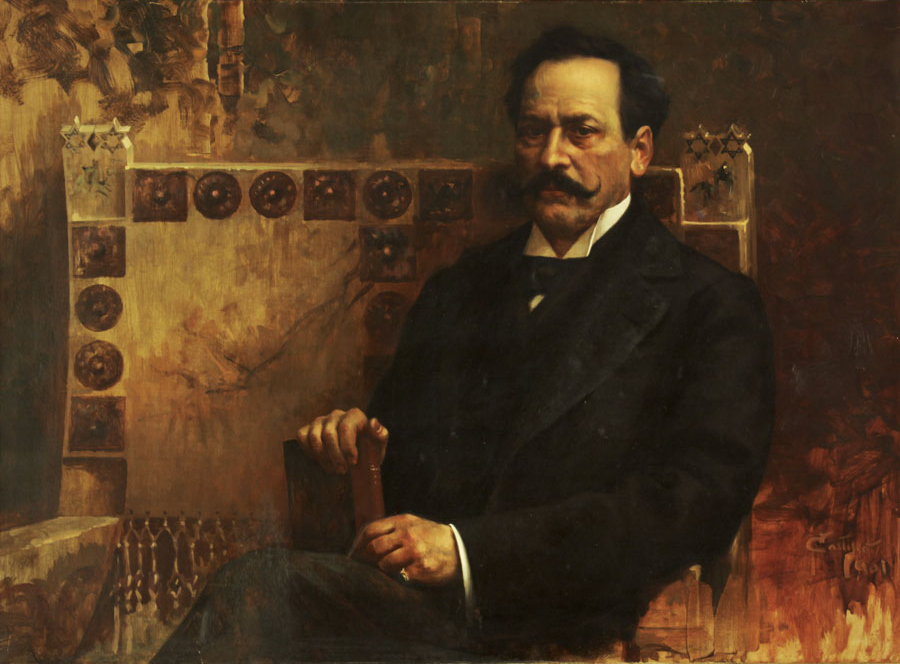
- 1901 portrait by Teófilo Castillo
- Born: November 12, 1850; Asunción, Paraguay
- Died: January 15, 1926 (aged 75); Asunción, Paraguay
- Occupations: Politician, writer, historian, librarian
- Writing career
- Notable works: La muerte del Mariscal López, El concepto de patria

Juan Silvano Godoi (November 12, 1850 – January 1926) was a librarian and intellectual at the time of the Paraguayan national reconstruction.

== Childhood and studies ==
He was born in Asunción on November 12, 1850. He was the son of the Colonel Juan Vicente Godoy (Note: As a youngster Juan Silvano began to replace the "y" in his original surname (Godoy) for an "I".) and Petrona Echagüe. Narciso Echagüe y Andía, his mother's father, was one of the leaders of the national independence process. He was imprisoned during Francia's dictatorship, and shot after twenty years in jail.

Juan Silvano studied in the Jesuit College of the Inmaculate Conception in the city of Santa Fe, Argentina. There, he was condisciple of José Zorrilla de San Martín. In the holidays of 1864, he spent some time in Asunción. Due to his short age and good luck, Francisco Solano López authorized him to continue his education in Argentina. This way, he avoided, along with two of his brothers, the Paraguayan War in which sixteen of the Echagüe family died. Some of the deceased were meritorious soldiers.

He entered the Faculty of Law of the University of Buenos Aires, and stayed there during most of the war. In January 1869, once Asunción was occupied, he interrupted his studies to move back to his land with a group of young fellow patriots. In spite of his religious formation, Godoi had become a mason and a freethinker.

== The post-war ==
During the time he spent in Paraguay after his return he knew many young national leaders. He was a co-founder of the Gran Club del Pueblo (a precursor of the traditional Liberal Party) along with José Segundo Decoud, Facundo Machaín, Juan José Decoud, Cayo Miltos and Miguel Palacios. He witnessed how many of his previously mentioned fellows vanished.

He was elected as a conventional in the district of the Catedral. He was a member of the commission that was in charge of redacting the Constitution of 1870.

In the chaotic environment of post-war Paraguayan politics, he and his family soon found themselves opposed to powerful people. After the killing of his brother Marcos, Juan Silvano declared himself an opponent of J. B. Gill, who had been president since 1874. Afterwards, he became a part of a conspiracy to murder of Gill. The assassination occurred in the middle of the street, April 12, 1877, and was headed by another of his brothers, Nicanor. In 1878, after a period in Buenos Aires, having fled in the aftermath of the assassination, he bought a ship, the Galileo, and weapons and steamed up the Paraguay River, with the objective of overthrowing Candido Bareiro's government - the movement was ultimately foiled by the Argentine Navy, which impeded the Galileo from moving further towards Asunción.

== Exile and late life ==
After the failed revolution, Godoi lived an eighteen year-long exile in Buenos Aires. His cultural background and education led him to meet most of the leading Argentine intellectuals, like Aristóbulo del Valle, Ramón J. Cárcano, Guido Spano, Mariano Pelliza and others.

During the government of Colonel Escurra, in 1895, he returned to Paraguay. He took his library of twenty thousand volumes along with him. He also took many of his famous paintings. In addition to this he offered the country two books of his own, as a display of patriotism in spite of his long absence.

In 1901, he became general director of the National Library, Museum and Archives. He represented Paraguay in 1910, the century of Argentina’s independence, in the American Congress.

Godoi died in January 1926, in Asunción. The mother of his children was Bienvenida Rivarola.

== Bibliography ==
Godoi wrote many books, and was a polemic journalist. In the writings he left, there is a valuable legacy like:

- Monografías históricas (1893)
- Operaciones de Guerra del general José Eduvigis Díaz (1897)
- El concepto de patria (1998)
- El coronel Juan Antonio Escurra (1903)
- La muerte del Mariscal López (1905)
- El Barón de Río Branco (1913)
- El asalto a los acorazados (1919)
