= Venancio Víctor López =

Paraguayan chancellor

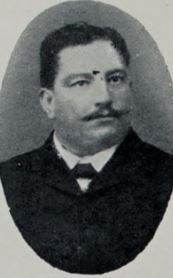

Minister of Foreign Affairs
- In office 25 November 1890 – 9 June 1894
- Preceded by: Juan Crisóstomo Centurión
- Succeeded by: Héctor Velázquez

Minister of Justice, Religion and Public Education of Paraguay
- In office 8 March 1899 – 15 May 1899
- Preceded by: José Segundo Decoud
- Succeeded by: Gerónimo Pereira Cazal

Minister of the Paraguayan Supreme Court of Justice
- In office 22 January 1887 – 1888

Personal details
- Born: 21 February 1862; Asunción, Paraguay
- Died: 11 August 1927 (aged 65); Buenos Aires, Argentina

Venancio Víctor López Otazú (21 February 1862 – 11 August 1927) was a Paraguayan journalist, diplomat and professor of law. He was a grandson of Carlos Antonio López, who was the leader of Paraguay between 1841 and 1862, and nephew of Francisco Solano López, president of Paraguay between 1862 and 1870.

== Biography ==
=== Early life and studies ===
Venancio was born in Asunción in 1862, to Venancio López Carrillo and Manuela Otazú Machaín. His father Venancio was Carlos Antonio López's son, and Francisco Solano López's brother; between them, the last two were Paraguay's heads of state between 1841 and 1870.

In 1864, the Triple Alliance War started, pitting Paraguay versus the much larger and populous nations of Brazil, Uruguay and, from 1865 onwards, Argentina. The conflict was mostly fought on Paraguayan soil and led to great destruction for the country; it ended in 1870, but the foreign occupation lasted until 1876, when the final border agreement with Argentina was signed.

His father Venancio died during the war. In the conflict's aftermath, his mother Manuela took him and his brothers, Ercilia and Carlos, to Buenos Aires, where he was educated, eventually becoming a Juris Doctor through the University of Buenos Aires' Faculty of Law.

=== Return to Asunción ===
Coming back to Paraguay in the late 1880s, he ended up marrying ex-president Higinio Uriarte's daughter, María del Carmen Uriarte Velilla; when she died, he remarried, taking as his spouse Victorina Viera.

He joined the Colorado Party soon after returning; it concentrated most of those who had been on Solano López' side during the war. During Juan Gualberto González's government, he was named Minister of Foreign Affairs, a position he held between 1890 and 1894; he also had held a seat in the Supreme Court between 1887 and 1888, and taught in the Universidad Nacional de Asunción.

Briefly, in 1899, he was made Minister of Justice, Religion and Education in Emilio Aceval's cabinet.

=== Later life and death ===
He died in 1927 in Buenos Aires.
