= Salvador Jovellanos =

Paraguayan politician

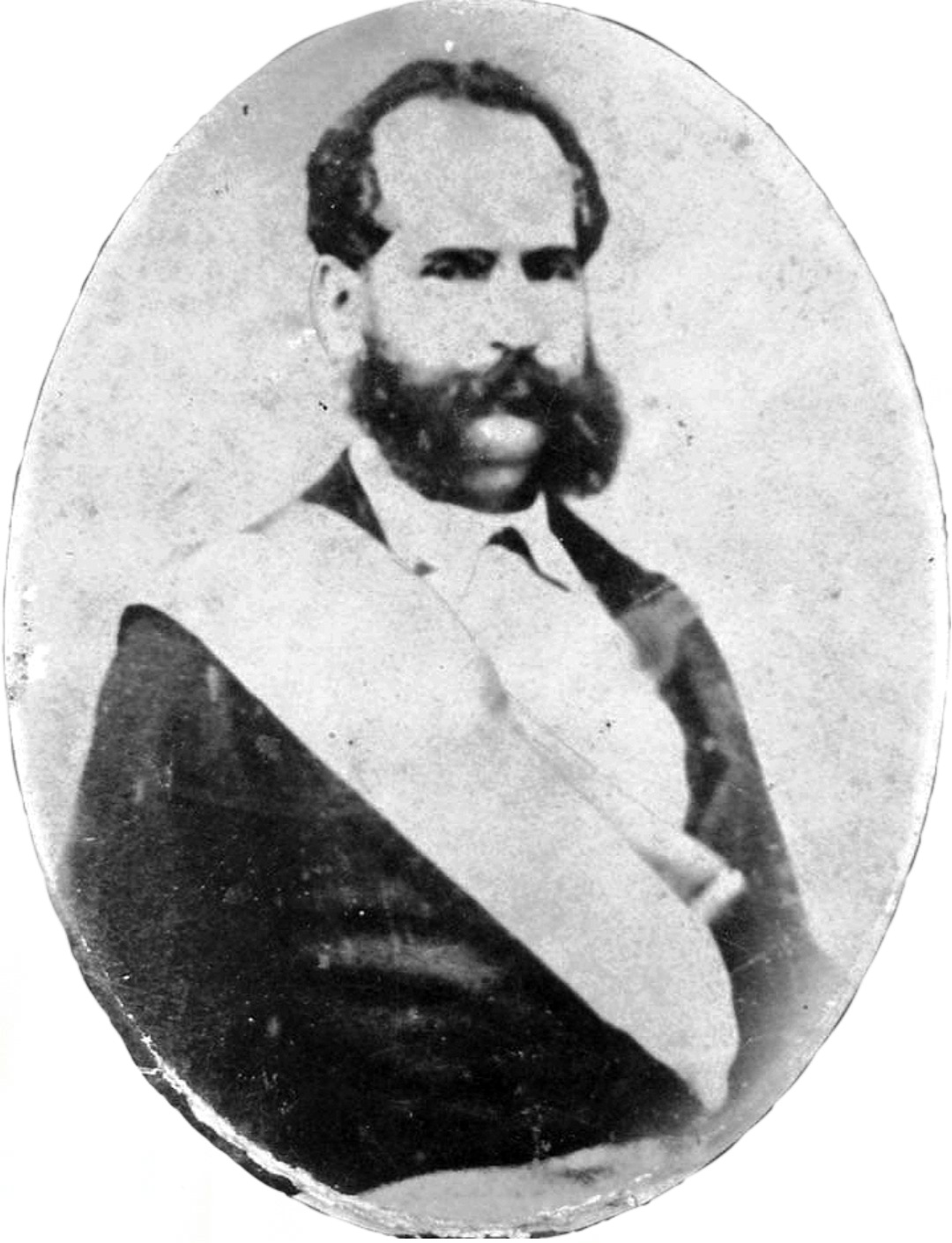

5th President of Paraguay
- In office December 18, 1871 – November 25, 1874
- Vice President: Vacant
- Preceded by: Cirilo Antonio Rivarola
- Succeeded by: Juan Bautista Gill

2nd Vice President of Paraguay
- In office 9 December 1871 – 18 December 1871
- President: Cirilo Antonio Rivarola
- Preceded by: Cayo Miltos
- Succeeded by: Higinio Uriarte (1874)

Personal details
- Born: December 31, 1833 Asunción, Paraguay
- Died: February 11, 1881 (aged 47) Buenos Aires, Argentina
- Party: Independent
- Spouse: Ercilia Bogado
- Parents: Bernardo Gumersindo Jovellanos Viaña (father); Manuela Francisca Guanes Gonzalez de los Rios (mother)

Salvador Silvestre del Rosario Jovellanos Guanes (December 31, 1833 – February 11, 1881) was a Paraguayan politician. He served as Vice President in 1871, and President from December 18, 1871 – November 25, 1874. His main concern as president was Paraguay's slow recovery from Paraguay's defeat in Paraguayan War with Brazil, Argentina and Uruguay. He died in Buenos Aires on February 11, 1881.

He was born in Asunción on December 31, 1833. He was very young when his family left the country during the regime of Carlos Antonio López to settle in Buenos Aires, where he formed his own family.

== Exile politics ==
Jovellanos was one of the founding members of the exile Paraguayan Association on December 28, 1858. After the start of Paraguayan War he signed a request to Argentine government on April 24, 1865, asking it to authorize formation of the Paraguayan Legion that would be formed from exiles and Lopez opponents. He was one of the early supporters of this idea, together with Otoniel Peña participating in the meeting of the steering committee held on January 18, 1865.

== Return to Paraguay ==
In mid-January 1869, a couple of weeks after Asuncion was occupied by the Allied forces, Jovellanos returned to his homeland together with other exiles - Juan Bautista Gill, José Segundo Decoud, Juan Antonio Jara, Carlos Loizaga, Benigno Ferreira, Cayo Miltos and others who signed a petition asking the Allies for formation of a Provisional government. On March 25, 1870, he joined the Gran Club del Pueblo (a precursor of Liberal Party) which was led by Facundo Machaín. In the elections of National Assembly he was elected from the Cathedral district with 302 votes. Jovellanos was member of the commission that drafted the Constitution of 1870 as well as commission that drafted the Electoral Law. He was Minister of Finance of Paraguay from June 1870 to November 1870.

== Presidency ==
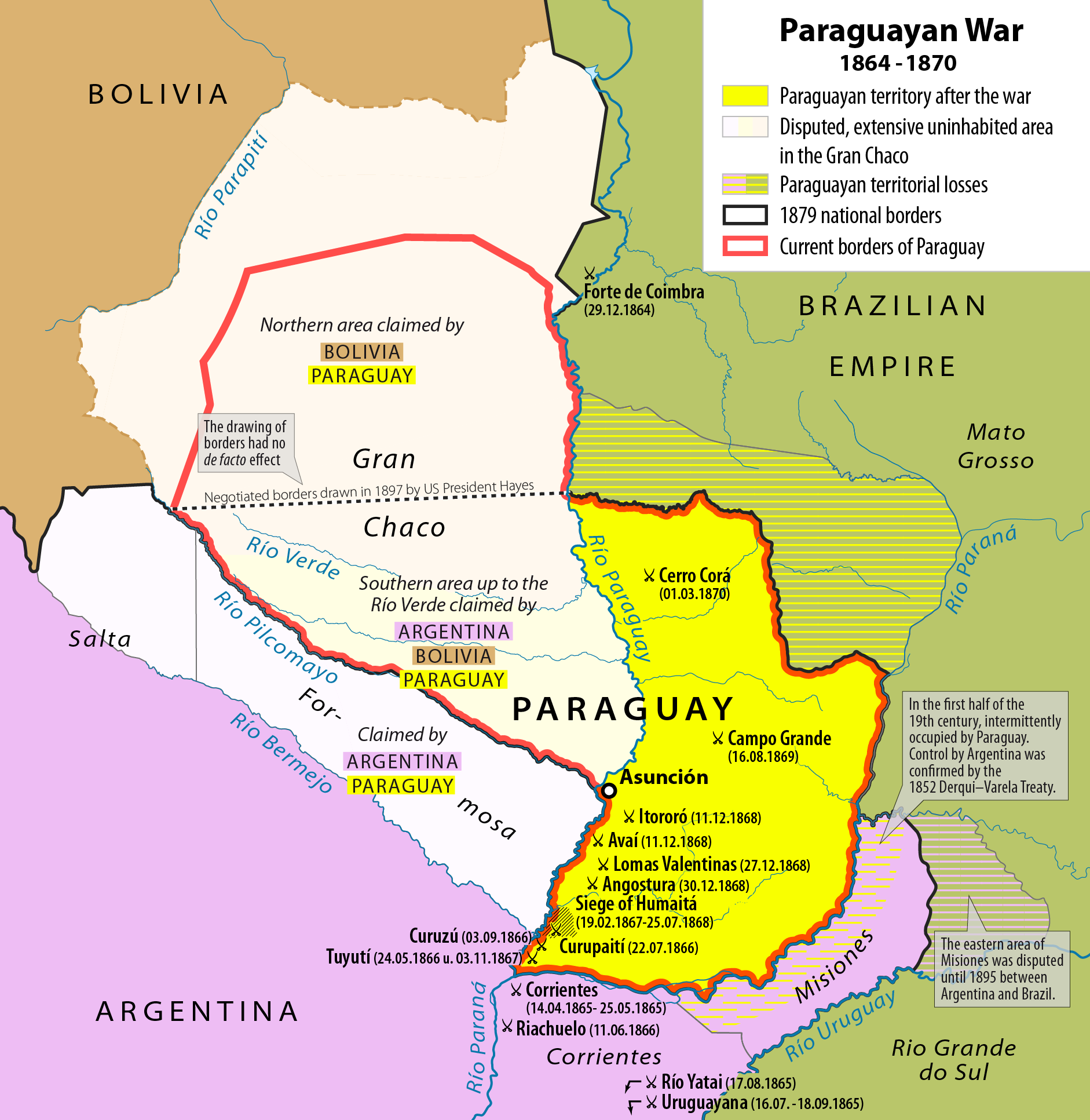
Paraguayan border claims and changes after the war

After the death from yellow fever of Vice President Cayo Miltos on January 7, 1871, National Assembly elected Jovellanos to the post of Vice President. During 1871 he also served as Minister of War and Navy and Interior Minister.

Following the resignation of President Cirilo Antonio Rivarola he assumed the post of President during the political upheaval that surrounded the fall of Rivarola. The removal of Rivarola was organized by Juan Bautista Gill in cooperation with Brazilians who wanted to place Gill in Presidency. However, before he could remove the Jovellanos, Gill was arrested on the orders of general Benigno Ferreira and deported from the country. During Jovellanos Presidency General Ferreira remained the power behind the throne.

During his government the Loizaga–Cotegipe Treaty of Peace and Borders with Empire of Brazil was signed on January 9, 1872. With this treaty Paraguay gave up territories north of Apa River and Amambai territory. Peace treaty with Uruguay was signed as well, but relations with Argentine reminded tense.

To rebuild the devastated country, a new loan of 2,000,000 pounds was secured from Great Britain on harsher terms than the 1871 loan. Much of this money was stolen and misused by politicians. This debt was repaid only in 1961.

Jovellanos sought to reorganize the public administration. His government paved some streets of Asuncion; created the Council of Public Education, Immigration office and the Economic and Management Boards. Police and internal revenue services were reorganized. The first tram line was built in Asuncion. It started at the port, went down the street until Colòn Street and Independencia Nacional, Palma and Libertad Street, now called Eligio Ayala, and reached its endpoint at the Central railway station.

Jovellanos was faced with many coup attempts and finally was forced from power after a rebellion started in 1874 under nationalist General Bernardino Caballero.

After leaving the post of President he left for exile in Buenos Aires where he died.

Political offices
Preceded by Cayo Miltos	Vice President of Paraguay; 1870–1871	Succeeded by Higinio Uriarte
Preceded by Cirilo Antonio Rivarola	President of Paraguay; 1871–1874	Succeeded by Juan Bautista Gill
