= Domingo Antonio Ortiz =

Paraguayan naval officer

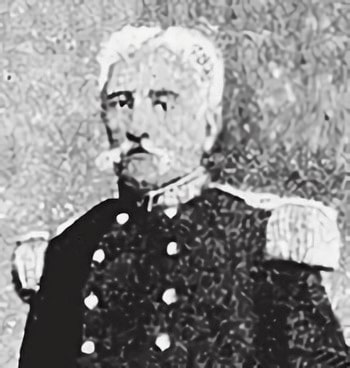

Minister of Justice, Religion and Public Education of Paraguay
- In office 11 November 1871 – 29 December 1871
- Preceded by: José Segundo Decoud
- Succeeded by: Benigno Ferreira

Minister of the Paraguayan Supreme Court of Justice
- In office 14 January 1881 – 11 January 1882
- In office 28 April 1887 – 10 May 1889

Personal details
- Born: 1832 Caraguatay, Paraguay
- Died: 1889 (aged 56–57)
- Awards: Officer of the National Order of Merit

Military service
- Allegiance: Paraguay
- Branch/service: Paraguayan Army; Paraguayan Navy
- Years of service: –1889
- Rank: Capitán de navío
- Commands: Yporá; Timbó Fort Artillery Division; Pirapó
- Battles/wars: Triple Alliance War; Battle of Riachuelo; Humaitá campaign; Battle of Itapirú; Battle of Curupayty; Pikysyry campaign; Battle of Angostura (POW); Bahía Negra incident

Domingo Antonio Ortiz Mereles (1832 – 1889) was a Paraguayan naval officer and politician. He served with distinction in the Triple Alliance War, and after the conflict participated in various governments through the 1870s and 1880s.

== Biography ==
=== Early life and the Triple Alliance War ===
Ortiz was born in 1832 in Caraguatay, located less than 100 kilometers away from the capital Asunción. He joined the Paraguayan Army at a young age, trained as a gunner under a Brazilian military mission, and then joined the Paraguayan Navy in 1853.

When the Triple Alliance War started, he was already an officer. In 1865 he was made a Knight of the National Order of Merit. He fought in the Battle of Riachuelo as commander of the steamer Yporá, with 5 cannons, the first to have been built in Paraguay; he also fought in Curupayty as a gunner for the east battery, and for his bravery in this action was promoted to Officer in the National Order of Merit, and in the Battle of Itapirú, also as gunner, where he was promoted to lieutenant.

In 1868, he was promoted to Capitán de Corbeta (corvette captain), a rank which in today's Paraguayan Navy is equivalent to Lieutenant Commander. In 1867 he was named commander of the artillery in the Timbó Fort, but when the Angostura Fortress fell in 1868, he was taken prisoner together with the rest of its garrison, and thus survived the deadly last few years of the war.

=== After the War ===
After his release in 1870, he soon returned to Paraguay, where he was named judge in a court of first instance, a position he held until September 1871, when he left to briefly assume the Ministry of Justice, Religion and Public Education of Paraguay, resigning by the year's end. He had already been named head of Asunción's port in August of the same year.

In 1872 he was designated as head of the Paraguayan commission assigned to determine the post-war borders with Brazil, a post which he held until 1875. In 1874 he briefly was Administrator of the National Railway; in late 1876 he then was made Attorney General for the State, a designation he kept until January 1881, when he was made Minister of the Supreme Court.

In January 1882 however he was made captain of the Paraguayan Navy's only ship at the time, the newly acquired Pirapó, a 440-ton steamer. In 1888 he was made Capitán de Navío, which then was the highest rank attainable in the Navy, and was responsible for retaking Bahía Negra from Bolivian forces, which had been present there since 1885. Since 1887 he had been a Minister of the Supreme Court again; he was removed from the post briefly before his death after a controversy involving the reversal of a decision made by the Chamber of Deputies.

In 1889, the year in which he died, he had a disagreement with the senator José Segundo Decoud over the latter's campaign to become president, one which culminated in a challenge by Ortiz for a duel; Decoud rejected the challenge, however.

The wide variety of positions he assumed in the post-war era are in great part a result of the small amount of able men of the political elite in Asunción (a consequence of the terrible loss of life in Paraguay during the Triple Alliance War). In particular many ex-military men were called upon to perform duties in the judiciary and in the country's general administration, even if they had no previous experience in these fields.
