= Mariano González (disambiguation) =

Mariano González (born 1981) is an Argentina international football midfielder and winger.

Mariano González may also refer to:

- Mariano González (politician) (1808-1870), first Vice President of Paraguay
- Mariano González Zarur (born 1949), Mexican politician
- Mariano González (footballer, born 1980), Argentine football defender
- Mariano González Maroto (born 1984), known as Nano, Spanish football left-back

== See also ==
- Mariana González (disambiguation)
