= Bernardino Caballero =

Paraguayan politician (1839–1912)

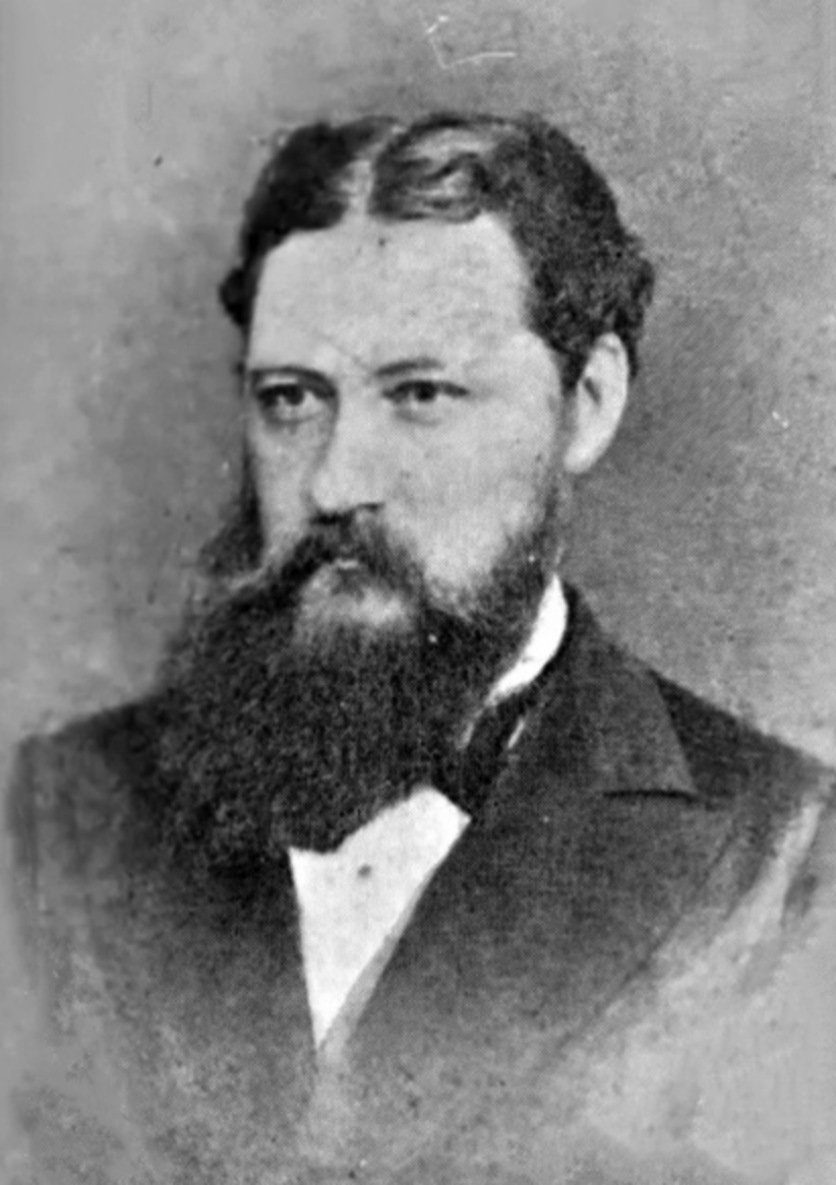

9th President of Paraguay
- In office 4 September 1880 – 25 November 1886
- Vice President: Juan Antonio Jara
- Preceded by: Cándido Bareiro
- Succeeded by: Patricio Escobar

Personal details
- Born: 20 May 1839 Ybycuí, Paraguay
- Died: 26 February 1912 (aged 72) Asunción, Paraguay
- Party: Colorado Party
- Known for: Serving as a General during the Paraguayan War (1864–1870), later as President of Paraguay between 1880 and 1886, and founding the Colorado Party in 1887.

Bernardino Caballero de Añazco Melgarejo y Genes (20 May 1839 – 26 February 1912) was a Paraguayan general and statesman. He commanded troops during the Paraguayan War, and was installed as President of Paraguay after an 1880 coup, serving from September 1880 to November 1886. He was term limited from serving another consecutive term, so he guaranteed that he would be succeeded by his close friend Patricio Escobar.

He was the founder of the Colorado Party in September 1887, the largest political party in Paraguay currently, along with the Liberal Party in second position.

== Early life ==
Born in Ybycuí, Caballero was a descendant of Spanish nobility, the son of Jose Ramón Caballero de Anazco (a descendant from Túpac Huallpa through Inca Garcilaso de la Vega) and his wife Melchora Inés Melgarejo y Genés. He married twice, to María de la Concepción Díaz de Bedoya and to Julia Álvarez. From the first marriage he had two children, Ramon Caballero de Bedoya, married to Martha Cahen, and had issue, and Melchora Caballero de Bedoya, married to her distant cousin Carlos Francisco Saguier Pereira. Outside of his marriages he had a further 90 children, all formally recognized by him, and thus today he has myriad descendants.

=== Military service ===
Caballero joined the Paraguayan Army in 1864 and fought in the Paraguayan War. He participated in the Mato Grosso campaign. Later he became the assistant of President Francisco Solano López in Humaitá and remaining loyal, rose through the ranks. He became an increasingly important leader of rearguard actions, eventually becoming a cavalry general. Caballero was the greatest living war hero, who was captured by Brazilians on 8 April 1870 near the Apa River after the Battle of Cerro Corá and released in May 1871. During his arrest he became friendly with Brazilians and their political and military support was instrumental later, during his political career.

== Post-war politics ==
Caballero returned to Asunción and became involved in politics, joining the López loyalist faction led by Cándido Bareiro. He was one of the leaders of March and June 1873 revolts and January 1874 revolt against the politically powerful Benigno Ferreira who was forced to go into exile in February 1874. Because of his growing influence, Caballero was made Interior minister in the government of Salvador Jovellanos. In November 1874 Caballero was appointed Minister of Justice, Worship and Education under the new President Juan Bautista Gill. Together with Vice President Higinio Uriarte he was sent to London in 1874–75 to clarify the situation with financial loans.

After the death of Juan Bautista Gill in 1877, he helped to ensure that his political ally Cándido Bareiro was elected to the Presidency.

== The coup of 1880 ==
On 4 September 1880, after the death of Cándido Bareiro his Vice President Adolfo Saguier was arrested by the Minister of War and Navy Pedro Duarte. Adolfo Saguier was then asked to sign his resignation. On the same day Senate of Paraguay met and elected Caballero to the Presidency. Thus, after the short presidencies of politically stronger Gill and Bareiro, the leader of 1873–74 rebellions had come to power.

=== Presidency ===
During his rule Civil Register was established, the city of Villa Florida was founded and the General Department of Immigration created. In June 1881 Banco Nacional and private Bance del Paraguay were established. During his presidency much of the land previously owned by the state and the ruling López family was sold off in order to raise money.

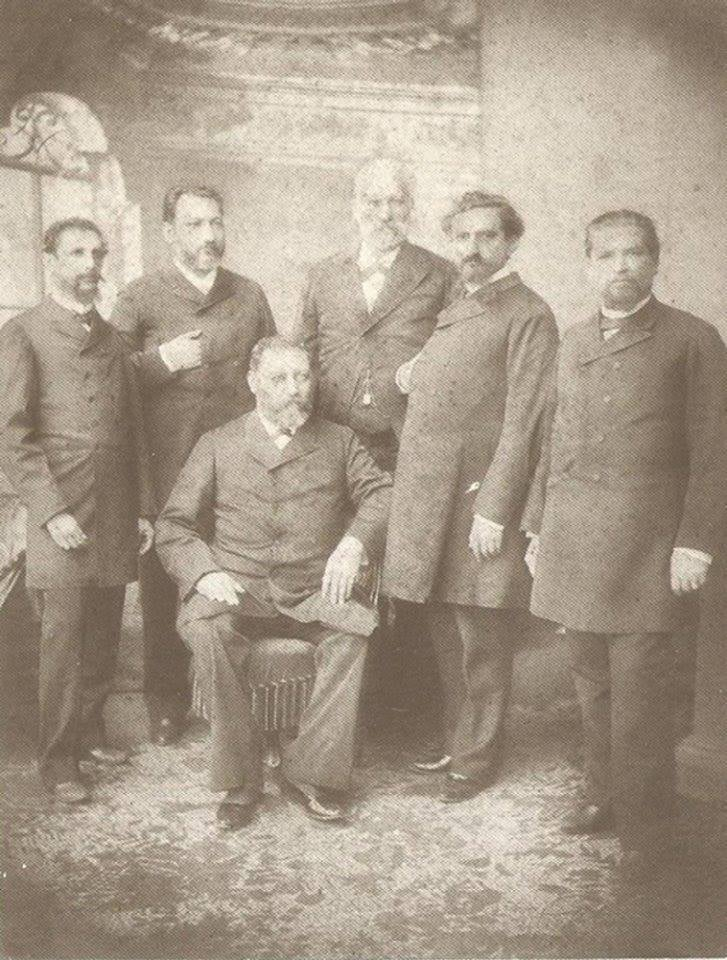
Bernardino Caballero's cabinet in 1886; he is sitting in the middle

== Later political life ==
Caballero rigged the 1886 Presidential election to ensure the victory of his close ally Patricio Escobar. In response, his political opponents founded the Liberal Party and two months later Caballero founded the ruling Colorado Party. From 1887 to 1904 as a former president he was also member of the Senate of Paraguay, and its president in 1894 and 1902.

Caballero maintained a large degree of control as he remained commander of the army and Colorado Party. His favored candidates controlled the country until 1894, when Juan Bautista Eguzquiza overthrew Juan Gualberto González. Caballero helped to organize another coup in 1902, putting Juan Antonio Escurra in power, but after Escurra's overthrow in the 1904 Revolution, the Liberals took power.

Caballero is buried in the National Pantheon of the Heroes, due to his wartime efforts and political significance. The Paraguayan town of General Bernardino Caballero is named after him.

Political offices
Preceded by Cándido Bareiro	President of Paraguay; 1880–1886	Succeeded by Patricio Escobar
