= Juan Francisco Decoud =

Paraguayan politician

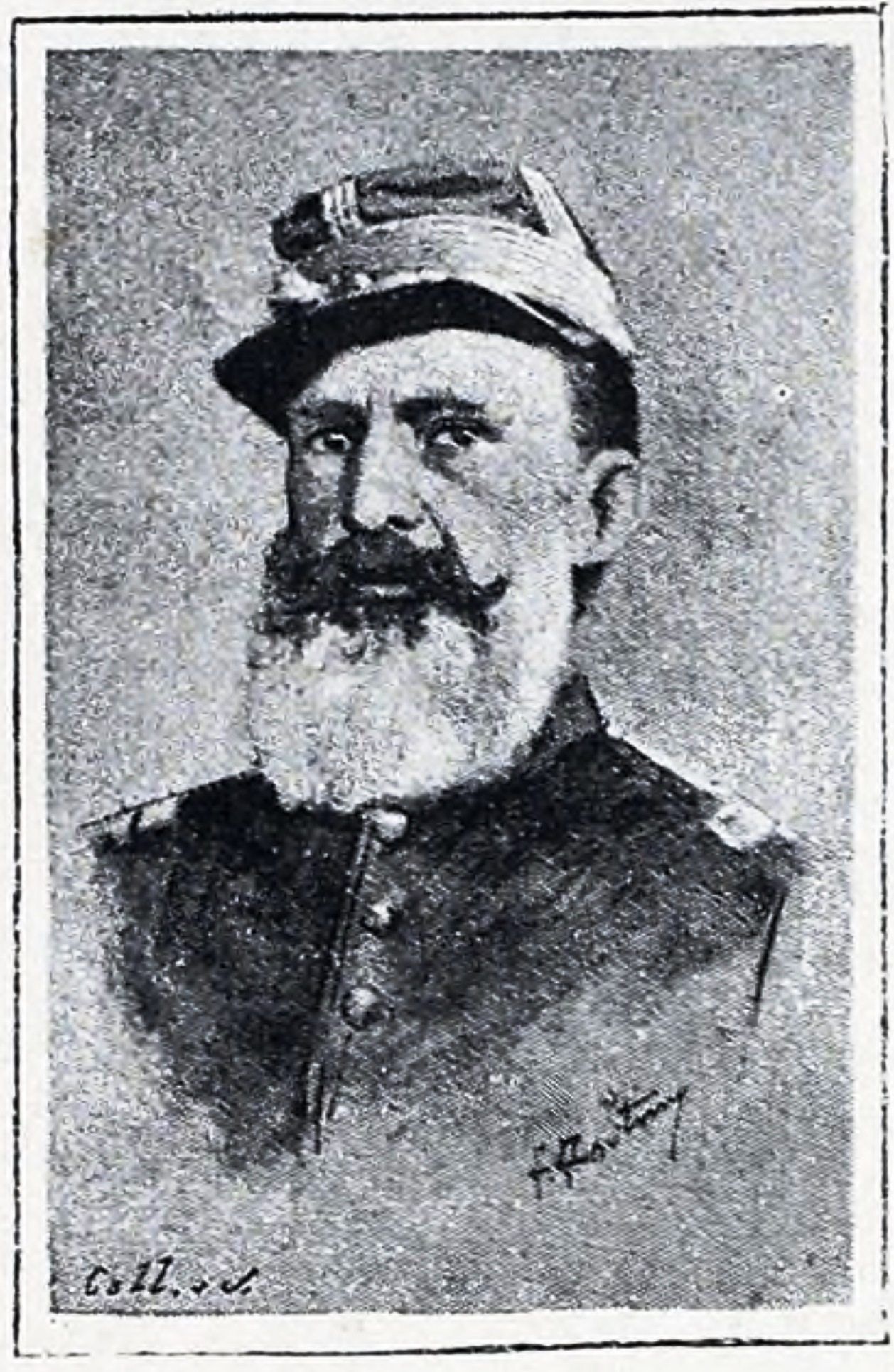

Personal details
- Born: 13 May 1813 Asunción, Paraguay
- Died: 12 April 1897 (aged 83) Asunción, Paraguay
- Resting place: La Recoleta Cemetery, Asunción
- Spouse: Maria Luisa Concepción Domecq
- Parents: Juan Francisco Decoud de los Santos; María Faustina Berazategui

Juan Francisco Decoud Berzategui (13 May 1813 – 12 April 1897) was a Paraguayan politician and military officer. Notably, he was a senior officer in the Paraguayan Legion during the early phases of the Paraguayan War. He also had an important role as a merchant in the Plata basin during the 19th century.

== Biography ==
=== Early life ===
Decoud was born in 1813 in Asunción to Juan Francisco Decoud de los Santos, a merchant of Italian and Portuguese descent, and María Faustina Berazategui; both had been members of the colonial elite, and retained economic power after independence in 1811.

Juan Francisco was educated in Paraguay, and from 1831 onwards was the head of his family's business affairs, given the death of his father. Tensions with the isolationist Francia regime were always high and by the end of the 1830s he and other wealthy hacendados survived by hiding away in their properties in the interior. Though he had some tensions with the López regime that followed, these took time to come to surface. He and some business partners had important commercial interests connecting Paraguay to Argentina, which meant he had important relations with the government, as the foreign trade of the country's most important goods was controlled by it.

In the 1850s he was named Consul-General to Brazil, and in 1857 Justice of the Peace for the Encarnación district (the present-day Itapúa Department), which borders Brazil and where his family had long held business interests. A proof of their close relation with the government was the fact that his son Héctor Francisco (b. 1855) had Francisco Solano López, son of dictator Carlos António López, as his godfather.

This all came to an end rather abruptly in the aftermath of the Canstatt affair of 1859, when Santiago Canstatt, an Uruguay-born British subject was arrested in Asunción on charges of conspiracy. Though eventually Canstatt was released under British diplomatic pressure, some of his Paraguayan co-conspirators weren't - and, notably, Juan Francisco's brothers Gregorio and Teodoro were executed. Soon afterwards (either in 1859 or 1860), Juan Francisco and his family moved to Buenos Aires, where they found a welcoming home amongst the numerous Paraguayan exiles there.

=== The Triple Alliance War ===
By the end of the 1850s and the start of the 1860s, the relatively large Paraguayan community in Buenos Aires had their own media, and would frequently call out for war against the López regime, for a variety of reasons. When war broke out in 1864 between Paraguay and Brazil, this community soon started to organize itself to fight, forming the still controversial Paraguayan Legion. Juan Francisco, being an important member between the exiles, was named its vice-commander. Though disagreements between him and the unit's commander, Fernando Iturburu, soon led to his resignation from the Legion, Juan Francisco subsequently joined the Argentine Army, serving as aide-de-camp to President Mitre.

He is attributed as having an important role in convincing Antonio Estigarribia to surrender his force (which included a good part of the pre-war Paraguayan Army) (Note: Precisely, 8 infantry battalions, out of the pre-war army's 26, and also 5 out of its 12 cavalry regiments were taken prisoner.) during the Siege of Uruguaiana.

=== The post-war decades ===
As post-war Paraguayan politics started to consolidate, he and his sons José Segundo and Juan José, together with Facundo Machaín and others, formed a powerful political bloc, formally named Club del Pueblo. Though this association did not last long, Juan Francisco was in virtue of his political power named Chief of Police in Asunción and promoted to the rank of Colonel in the Paraguayan Army. His period as Chief of Police ended when Facundo Machaín was ousted from the presidency.

Also of note is that it was through his money that La Regeneración, Paraguay's first private newspaper, was created in October of 1869.

Juan Francisco and his sons were involved in some of the rebellions that happened against Salvador Jovellanos' government between 1872 and 1873; in 1873 he was taken prisoner near Paraguarí by government forces. After this, he more or less stopped being active in national politics, turning his attentions back to his commercial enterprises. He died of influenza in April of 1897.
