= José Segundo Decoud =

Paraguayan politician and judge

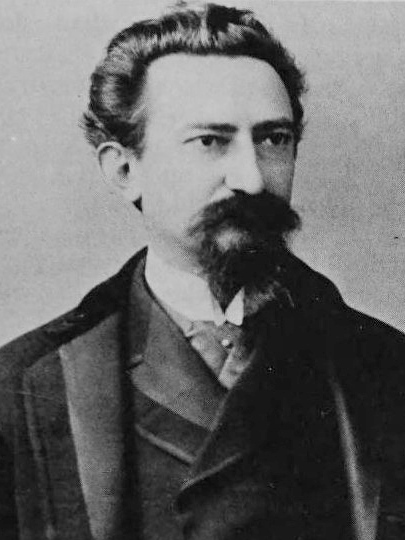
- Decoud in 1889

Senator of Paraguay
- In office 28 September 1888 – 3 March 1909

Minister of Justice, Religion and Public Education of Paraguay
- In office 2 March 1899 – 8 March 1899
- Preceded by: José Caminos
- Succeeded by: Venancio Víctor López
- In office 15 April 1898 – 4 June 1898
- Preceded by: José Mateo Collar
- Succeeded by: Benjamín Aceval
- In office 25 November 1878 – 9 July 1879
- Preceded by: Agustín Cañete
- Succeeded by: José Bazáras
- In office 11 July 1871 – 11 November 1871
- Preceded by: José Mateo Collar
- Succeeded by: Domingo Antonio Ortiz

Minister of Foreign Affairs of Paraguay
- In office 9 June 1895 – 19 June 1900
- Preceded by: Héctor Velázquez
- Succeeded by: Fabio Queirolo
- In office 2 March 1891 – 14 April 1891
- Preceded by: Venancio Victor López
- Succeeded by: Benjamín Aceval
- In office 29 December 1887 – 28 September 1888
- Preceded by: Agustín Cañete
- Succeeded by: Juan Crisóstomo Centurión
- In office 9 July 1879 – 25 November 1886
- Preceded by: Benjamín Aceval
- Succeeded by: Benjamín Aceval
- In office 17 May 1871 – 11 July 1871
- Preceded by: Carlos Loizaga
- Succeeded by: Bernardino Caballero

Minister of Finance of Paraguay
- In office 25 November 1890 – 17 July 1891
- Preceded by: José Tomás Sosa
- Succeeded by: Otoniel Peña

President of the Paraguayan Supreme Court of Justice
- In office 14 December 1876 – 11 July 1878
- Preceded by: Carlos Loizaga
- Succeeded by: José González Granado

Paraguayan Ambassador to Brazil
- In office 1892–1894

Personal details
- Born: 14 May 1848 Asunción, Paraguay
- Died: 3 March 1909 (aged 60) Asunción, Paraguay
- Resting place: Recoleta Cemetery, Asuncion
- Party: Colorado (1887–1900)
- Spouse: María Benigna Peña Guanes
- Parents: Juan Francisco Decoud Berazategui; María Luisa Concepción Domecq Grance

José Segundo Decoud Domecq (14 May 1848 – 3 March 1909) was a Paraguayan politician, journalist, diplomat and military officer. He is often considered one of the foremost intellectuals of his generation, and was also one of the first liberals of the country. Decoud was one of the founders of the long-standing Colorado Party, having been its first vice-president and written its founding instrument.

During the Paraguayan War, Decoud was a member of the Paraguayan Legion fighting against the Paraguayan government. After leaving the regiment, he wrote an anti-Triple Alliance newspaper criticizing their territorial claims on Paraguay; and once the war was nearly over, he returned to Asunción, and helped found La Regeneración, Paraguay's first wholly private newspaper.

He balanced his director duties with his roles as a member of the constitutional assembly which drafted the 1870 Constitution and secretary to Cirilo Rivarola, triumvir and future president. Between the 1870s and 1900s, he would continue to be an important contributor to the country's newspapers, and maintain a leading role in most of Paraguay's presidential cabinets, despite being labeled a traitor by his political adversaries and some of the written media.

== Biography ==
=== Early life ===
Segundo Decoud was born in Asunción on 14 May 1848 to Juan Francisco Decoud and Maria Luisa Concepción Domecq during Carlos Antonio López's rule. The Decouds gradually became opposed to the López regime, and in the early 1850s, the execution of Decoud's uncles Teodoro and Gregorio for treason forced his family into exile.

Together with his brother Juan José, he studied at the Colegio del Uruguay in Entre Ríos, Argentina and later joined the law school at the University of Buenos Aires. With the outbreak of the Paraguayan War, however, he abandoned his studies and enlisted into the Paraguayan Legion, a military unit formed out of oppositionists of Francisco Solano López in Buenos Aires in 1865, though he left the unit before the war ended due to disagreement with the Allies' war goals which had come to public light in May 1866. It was while he was in the Legion that he aided in convincing Antonio Estigarribia to surrender his force (which included a good part of the pre-war Paraguayan Army) (Note: Precisely, 8 infantry battalions, out of the pre-war army's 26, and also 5 out of its 12 cavalry regiments were taken prisoner.) during the Siege of Uruguaiana. Even after he left the Legion, he fought under General Wenceslao Paunero in the Argentine Army, taking part in the defeat at Curupayty.

As the war went on, he and his brother started to publish a newspaper called El Nacionalista in Corrientes, in which they harshly denounced the Treaty of the Triple Alliance, which would lead to Paraguay losing territory. This, in turn, soured the Decouds' relations with the Brazilian authorities.

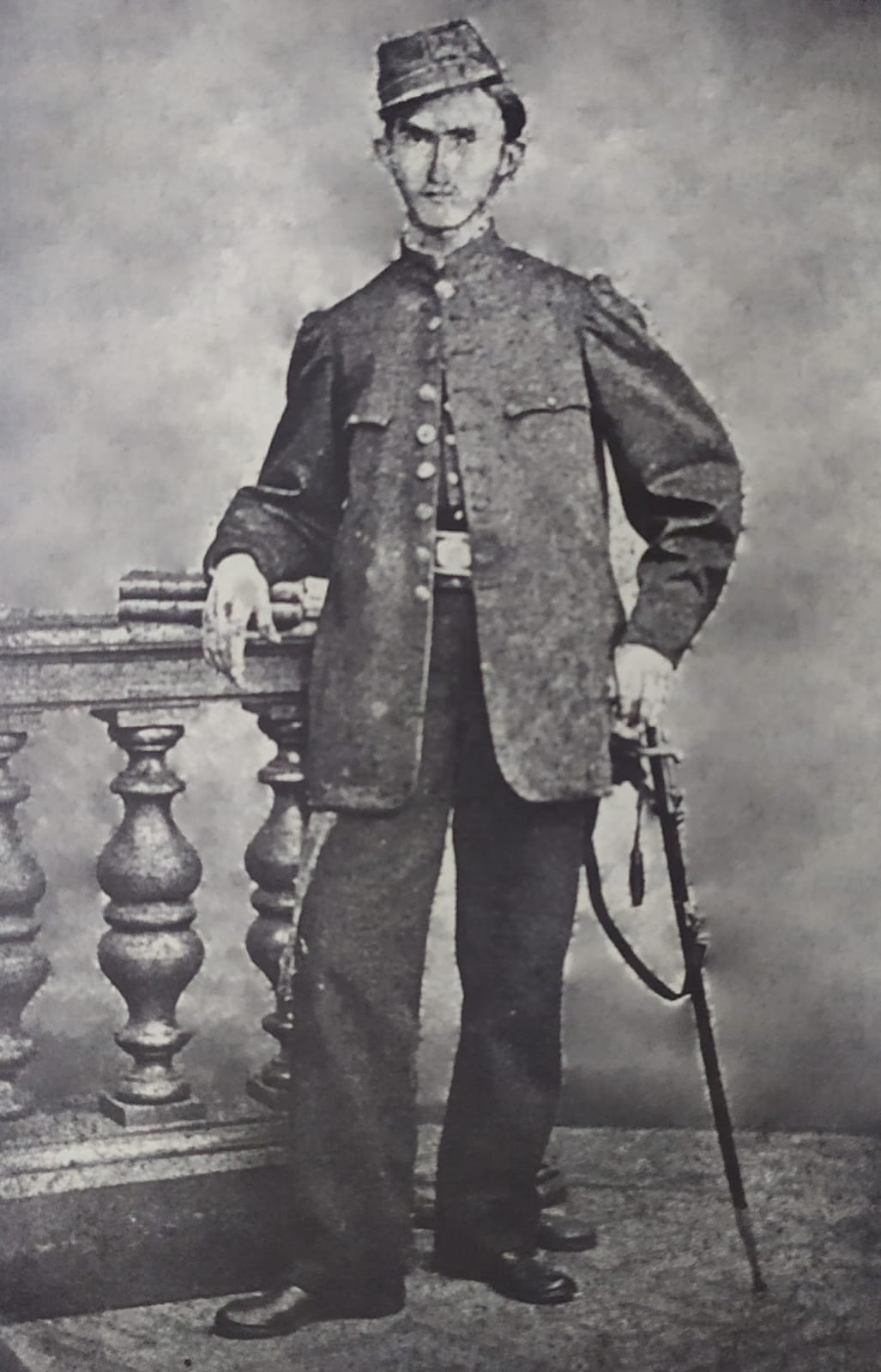
Segundo Decoud as an ensign during the Triple Alliance War (undated)

=== Political life ===
Months before the war was over, and with the chief Brazilian diplomat Silva Paranhos' approval, the new Paraguayan politics began to form. On 26 June 1869, the Club del Pueblo was created with Decoud as a secretary. The club was a liberal political organization that mostly congregated former members of the Paraguayan Legion and other dissenters to the López regime. Already considered influential for his work in civic, social, and political activities of postwar, Decoud was elected to be a member the constitutional assembly that created the 1870 Constitution, and in 1871 was made minister of Foreign Affairs for Cirilo Rivarola's government, having previously been Rivarola's secretary while the latter served as triumvir. His father Juan Francisco had been considered for the role of triumvir, but the Brazilian authorities distrusted the Decoud family and named Rivarola in his stead.

Afterwards, as Paraguayan politics took a violent turn, Decoud temporarily withdrew from government duties to focus on his career as a journalist, and returned only in 1878 as minister for the Candido Bareiro government. The 1880s were the years in which he was most active and had the greatest impact upon Paraguayan politics. In 1883, as chancellor, he signed the Decoud-Kubly agreement with Uruguay, where Uruguay forgave any war debts Paraguay might have with them. In 1885, he went to London as an extraordinary envoy and managed to renegotiate Paraguay's debt from a little short of 3 million pounds sterling to 850 thousand, though the country had to cede 8,700 km^{2} of land to the bondholders in exchange. As a diplomat, he also represented Paraguay as ambassador to the Empire of Brazil and to the Uruguayan government. Besides this, he was a co-founder of the Colorado Party in 1887, alongside ex-president Bernardino Caballero and others, contributing a number of years as a leading ideologue. The foundation of the country's first university, the Universidad Nacional de Asunción, was in good part motivated by him as well. In addition, he was a mason.

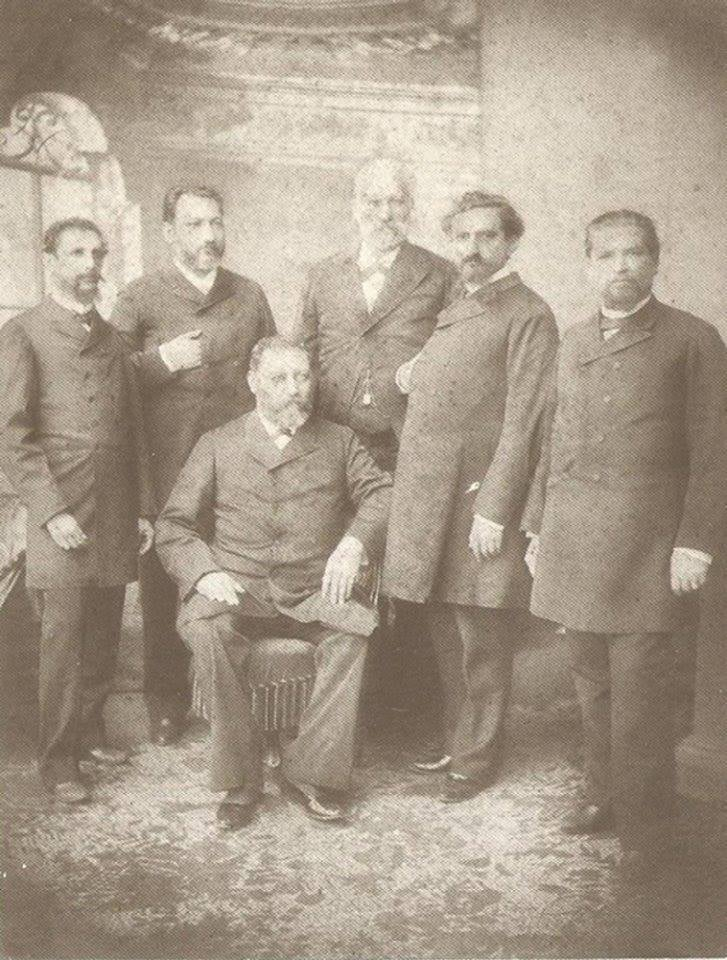
Bernardino Caballero's cabinet in 1886; Decoud is the second man from the right

Some controversies marked his career. He was one of the foremost advocates for the process of land sales by the government conducted from 1883 onwards, which served to rapidly privatize land ownership and had a somewhat short-lived impact on the country's finances. He also was accused of having plotted with Argentine authorities in the 1870s to allow for Paraguay's annexation to the former country; his involvement with the Paraguayan Legion during the 1860s saw him frequently being called a traitor by his political adversaries in his later life. In the 1890s, he would still occupy many cabinet positions and was even considered for the presidency, but political intrigues kept him from power. (Note: Namely, in 1894, president González was preparing to name Decoud as his successor, a movement that was two years in the making. This institutional backing meant that Decoud was likely going to be president; Argentina also favored him over the other candidates. However, Brazilian diplomacy disapproved of Decoud, and its representant in situ, Amaro Cavalcanti, funded a coup by the prestigious general Juan Bautista Egusquiza to topple González. The latter's vice-president, Morínigo, completed his term, and was succeeded by Egusquiza.) In 1900, he left the Colorado Party in disagreement with its policies.

=== Journalistic career ===
José Segundo Decoud began his career in the Paraguayan press soon after his return to the country in 1869. Together with his brother Héctor Decoud, he worked as an editor and writer for the newspaper La Regeneración in that same year; the paper lasted until September 1870. Throughout the 1870s and 1880s, he contributed to other newspapers such as La Reforma and La Opinión Pública. His more impactful texts were frequently republished in Argentine newspapers. Decoud also translated Joseph Alden's The Science of Government in Connection with American Institutions to Spanish, and wrote books and articles, with Recuerdos históricos, La amistad, Cuestiones Políticas y Económicas and El patriotismo being amongst the most important according to Calzada, his biographer, who also claimed that Decoud had been preparing for some years to write a book that would discuss Paraguayan history from the colonial era to his time before his death.

In 2014, the historian and diplomat Ricardo Scavone Yegros prepared a compilation and a critical study of Decoud's works, publishing it under one binding.

=== Death ===
Disillusioned with the direction of post-war Paraguayan politics, Decoud committed suicide in 1909, leaving a letter to his wife in which he stated:

The citizens of classical antiquity preferred death to a sterile life cut short by the low passions of men. I have thus conceived the idea of an immolation, as a personal sacrifice before the sacred area of the Homeland. Hopefully this holocaust closes the list of those who, having given their whole lives, also succumb offering their own death! Let the dead bury their dead!

His suicide letter can be read in Francisco Doratioto's Relações Brasil-Paraguai: afastamento, tensões e reaproximação (1889-1954).

== Selected bibliography ==
- Decoud, José S. (2014). Ensayos sobre cuestiones políticas y económicas [Essays on political and economic issues] (in Spanish). Tiempo de Historia. ISBN 978-9-996-76096-9.
- Decoud, José S. (1904). A List of Books, Magazine Articles, and Maps Relating to Paraguay. Government Printing Office.
- Decoud, José S.; Porter, Hampden (1902). Paraguay (2nd ed.). International Bureau of the American Republics.
- Decoud, José S. (1898). Exposición presentada a la H. Cámara de Diputados a propósito de la investigación iniciada en virtud de una denuncia de anexión [Exposition presented to the H. Chamber of Deputies regarding the investigation started on an accusation of annexation] (in Spanish). H. Kraus.
- Decoud, José S. (1887). Nociones de derecho constitucional [Notions of constitutional law] (in Spanish). J. Peuser.
