= Héctor Velázquez (physician) =

Paraguayan diplomat and physician

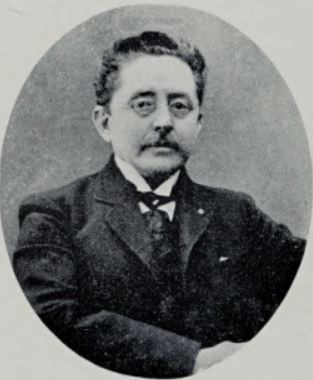

Minister of Foreign Affairs of Paraguay
- In office 25 November 1894 – 9 June 1895
- Preceded by: Venancio Víctor López
- Succeeded by: José Segundo Decoud
- In office 25 October 1910 – 17 January 1911
- Preceded by: Manuel Gondra
- Succeeded by: Cecilio Báez

Héctor Velázquez (1864–1945) was a Paraguayan physician, diplomat and educator. He was the Universidad Nacional de Asunción's first Paraguayan dean, and he served as Minister of Foreign Affairs during Juan Bautista Egusquiza's government. He was also Paraguay's first ophthalmologist ever.

== Biography ==
=== Early life and studies ===
Velázquez was born in Asunción in 1864 to Cantalicia Velázquez and an unknown father. The first in his class in the Colegio Nacional, he was given a scholarship by the government to study medicine in the University of Buenos Aires' Medical School.

=== Professional life ===
After he had returned to Paraguay, where he was the first practitioner of ophthalmology in the country, he was dean of the Universidad Nacional de Asunción from April 1891 to February 1893, being 27 years old when he took the job. A year after leaving that post, he became part of General Juan Bautista Egusquiza's cabinet as Minister of Foreign Affairs.

In 1895, he left the cabinet to make way for veteran diplomat José Segundo Decoud. Egusquiza in compensation gave him the post of ambassador plenipotentiary in Washington D.C. In 1910 he held the Ministry again for close to three months.

In 1898 he was made dean of the Universidad Nacional de Asunción's medical school. It had been closed since 1890, so he had to reorganize its faculty.

He died in 1945.

== Honours ==
- Spain : Commander by Number in the Order of Charles III.
