= Cándido Bareiro =

President of Paraguay (1833–1880)

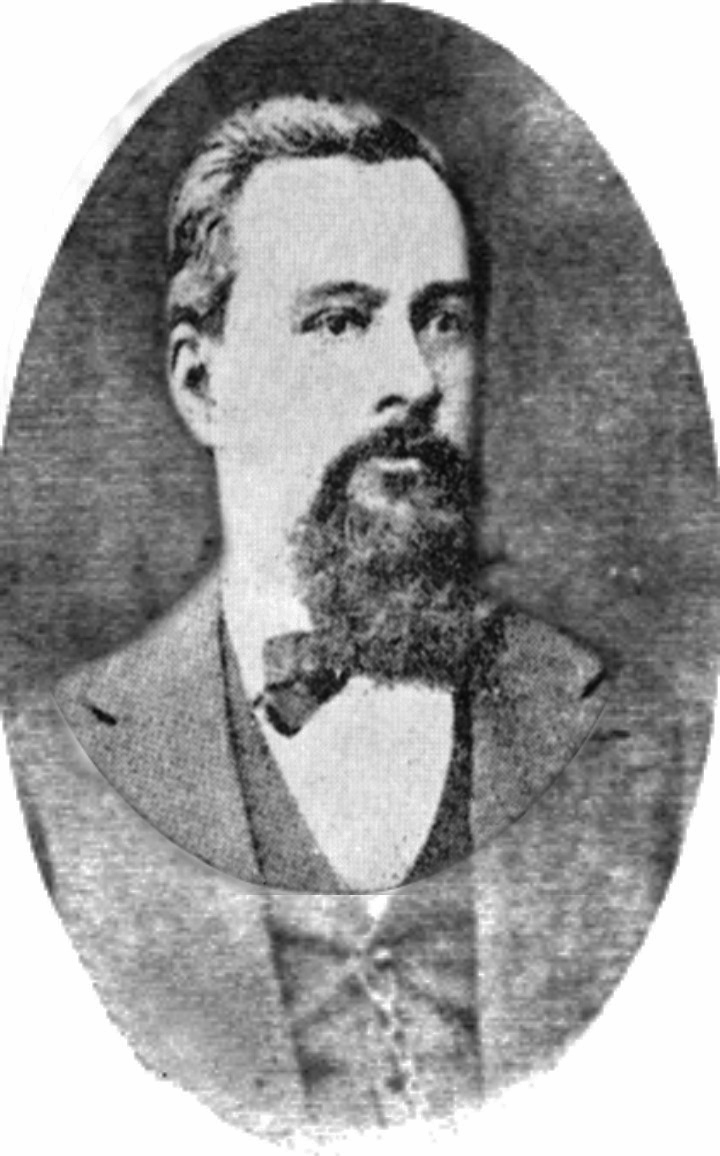

8th President of Paraguay
- In office November 25, 1878 – September 4, 1880
- Vice President: Adolfo Saguier
- Preceded by: Higinio Uriarte
- Succeeded by: Bernardino Caballero

Personal details
- Born: Cándido Pastor Bareiro Caballero; October 27, 1833 Luque, Paraguay
- Died: September 4, 1880 (aged 46) Asunción, Paraguay

Cándido Pastor Bareiro Caballero (October 27, 1833 – September 4, 1880) was President of Paraguay from 27 November 1878 to 4 September 1880 and the leading politician of the post-war decade.

Bareiro served as ambassador and commercial agent for the Paraguayan government of Francisco Solano López government in Europe.

During the last months of Paraguayan War he returned to Paraguay in 1869 and entered politics, where he started a political movement that would result in creation of the Colorado Party. A strong ally of General Bernardino Caballero, he was elected president in 1878 with Caballero's help and died from a stroke after two years in office.

== Early life ==
He was born on October 27, 1833 in Luque. Son of Jose Luis Bareiro Montiel and Felipa Mayor Dolores Caballero he was the grandson of the famous Paraguayan founding father of Independence, Pedro Juan Caballero. He went to a school managed by the Argentine teacher Juan Pedro Escalada. Bareiro benefited from the opening to the world which was initiated by the regime of Carlos Antonio López, with a group of other Paraguayan students on June 2, 1858, he sailed to Europe, where in London he finished his studies. He returned home in the middle of December 1863 and received a bonus of 200 pesos. In May 1865 he was awarded with the National Order of Merit.

The Uruguayan writer Jose Carranza Sienra, who met him at the start of the Paraguayan War, said of Bareiro:

... he has a clear talent, an illustration of anything vulgar, a simple and sympathetic look

— Jose Carranza Sienra

== Political biography ==
On March 21, 1864, government appointed Cándido Bareiro as chargé d'affaires in the Paraguayan Embassy in London and Paris. He was relieved from his post in October 1867 due to inability to organize critically needed armament shipments to Paraguay. By the time he managed to return to Asunción in February 1869, the city was already occupied by the Allied armies.

=== Bareiro faction ===
Around him quickly gathered the remaining Lopez loyalists who on March 31, 1869, founded the Republican Union Club which in early 1870 become the Club del Pueblo and after February 17, 1878 Club Libertad and who published their newspaper La Voz del Pueblo.

Bareiro faction was also known as lopiztas because of their loyalty to the memory of President Lopez and it was opposed to the Decoud faction who had established their rival Club del Pueblo (after March 23, 1870, the Gran Club del Pueblo). Both of these factions were crucial for the establishment of the Colorado Party in 1887.

Together with Bernardino Caballero he was one of the organizers of the revolt against the presidency of Salvador Jovellanos. Despite this, after the removal of Benigno Ferreira in February 1874 he was appointed a foreign minister by Jovellanos. In this capacity he went to London where he tried to negotiate the war loan payment crisis. He served as Minister of Finance of Paraguay during the Presidencies of Juan Bautista Gill and Higinio Uriarte from August 1876 to August 1878.

=== President, 1878–80 ===
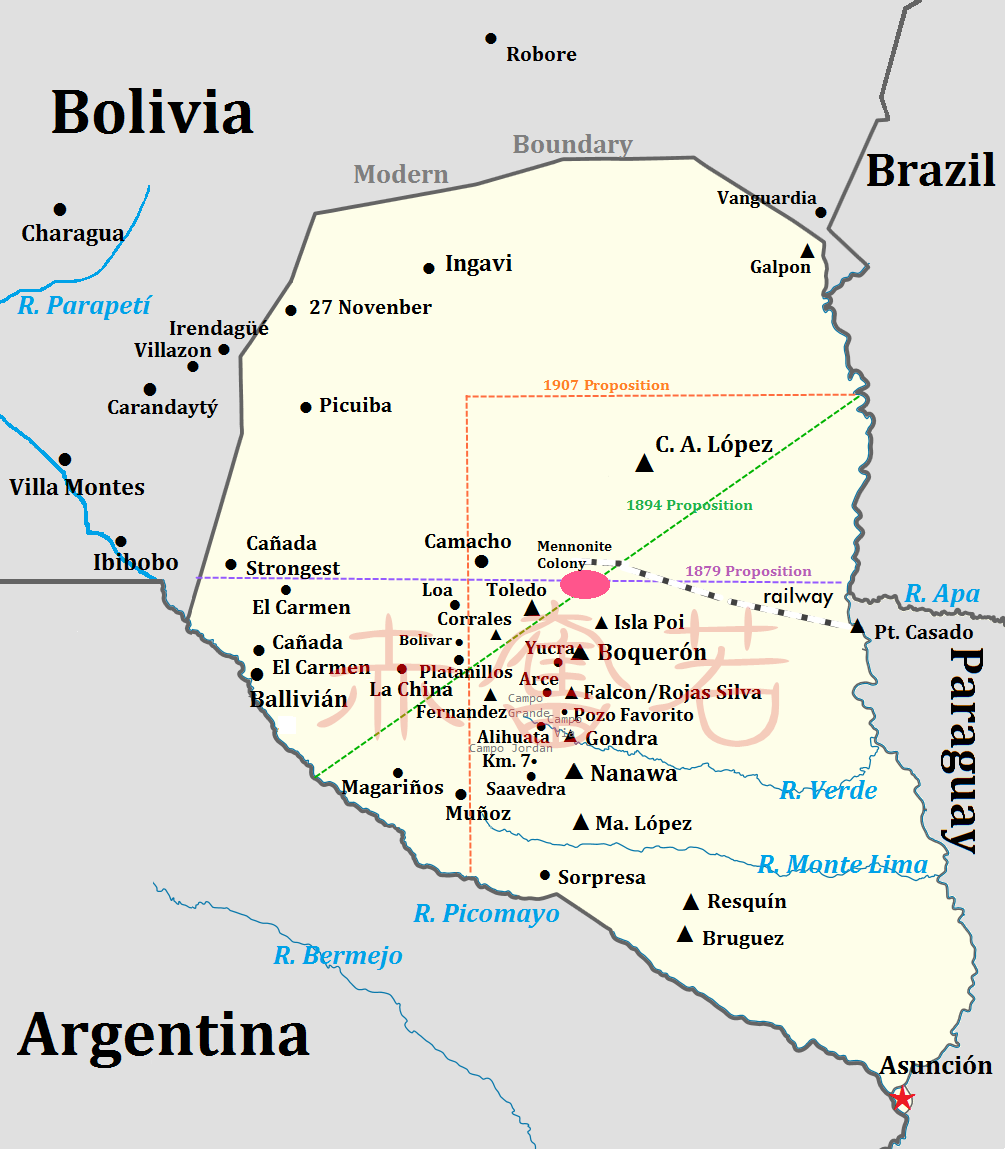
Map of the disputed Chaco region

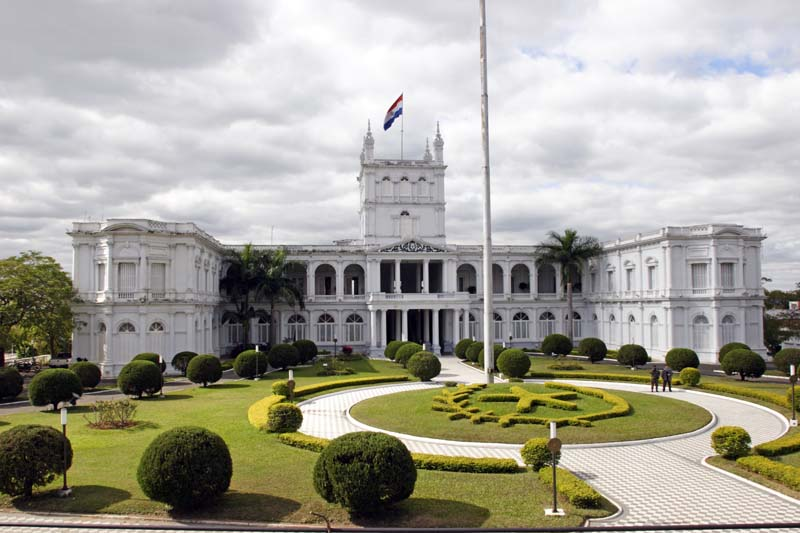
Lopez Palace in Asunción

On November 25, 1878, he finally was elected to the presidency. His government included:

- Adolfo Saguier, Vice-president.
- Juan Antonio Jara, Treasury.
- Bernardino Caballero, Minister of Interior.
- José Segundo Decoud and Jose Antonio Baez, Ministers of Justice, Culture and Public Education.
- Patricio Escobar and Pedro Duarte, Ministers of War and Navy.
- Benjamin Aceval and José Segundo Decoud, Ministers of Foreign Affairs.

In October 1877 he had involved in the murders of imprisoned former President Facundo Machain and others suspected in the assassination of President Gill. In December 1878 he probably was involved in the assassination of former President Rivarola. His political ally Bernardino Caballero was the main organizer of these murders. In June 1879 he suppressed the Galileo uprising led by the exiled Juan Silvano Godoi.

During his rule Paraguay won part of the disputed Gran Chaco territory. This decision was made by international commission led by the US President Rutherford Hayes, in whose honor Presidente Hayes Department was created. After this decision, the Decoud-Quijarro treaty was signed on 15 October 1879 that recognized Bolivia's claims to northern Chaco, but it was never ratified. Argentina handed over territory of the West Villa, currently Villa Hayes where the first ice factory of the country was established.

Despite being almost bankrupt, Government proceeded with the construction of the Palace of Lopez; the Nueva Germania was established, bringing German immigrants to Paraguay; Pedro Juan Aponte was appointed as the first post-war bishop of Paraguay and Argentine Penal Code adopted.

After Bareiro's death his vice-president Adolfo Saguier was prevented from assuming the presidency by a bloodless coup led on September 4, 1880, by Bernardino Caballero. Saguier was arrested and the Senate was informed that he had resigned; Caballero was then elected to the presidency.

== Awards ==
- 1865 – National Order of Merit.

Political offices
Preceded by Higinio Uriarte	President of Paraguay; 1878–1880	Succeeded by Bernardino Caballero
