= Mariana González =

Mariana González may refer to:

- Mariana González Oliva (born 1976), Argentinian Olympic field hockey player
- Mariana González (fencer) (born 1979), Venezuelan Olympic fencer

== See also ==
- Mariano González (disambiguation)
