= Cayo Miltos =

Paraguayan politician

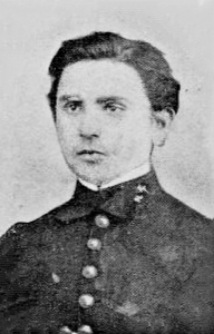
Cayo Miltos

Sotero Cayo Miltos Miers (1843, Concepción – 1871, Asunción) was a Paraguayan politician who served as Vice President of Paraguay.

He studied in universities in Argentina and Sorbonne. He returned to Paraguay in 1869 and was a political ally of Facundo Machaín and Juan Antonio Jara. After Cirilo Antonio Rivarola was elected as President of the Republic, Miltos was elected as President of Superior Tribunal Court and was also elected in the commission to write a new constitution, leading the opposition bloc within this body.

On November 24, 1870, he was elected as Vice President, by the National Constitutional Convention, taking office on the next day. He died in office on January 7, 1871, during a yellow fever outbreak.

Political offices
Preceded by Domingo Francisco Sánchez	Vice President of Paraguay; 1870-1871	Succeeded by Salvador Jovellanos
