= Benjamín Aceval, Paraguay =

Benjamín Aceval
- City
- Flag Seal
- Interactive map of Benjamín Aceval
- Coordinates: 24°58′13″S 57°34′00″W
- Country: Paraguay
- Department: Presidente Hayes
- Founded: 30 April 1859

Government
  - Intendente municipal: Oscar Duarte
- Elevation: 66 m (217 ft)

Population (2008)
  - Total: 16,248
- Time zone: -4 Gmt
- Postal code: 9800
- Area code: (595) (271)
- Climate: Cfa

Benjamín Aceval is a city in the Department of Presidente Hayes in Paraguay. The city is the seat of the Roman Catholic Diocese of Benjamín Aceval.

== Etymology ==
The city is named after Tomás Benjamín Aceval Marín, the Paraguayan diplomat who took documents related to the Chaco Boreal dispute with Argentina, after the Paraguayan War, to the President of the U.S.A. Rutherford B. Hayes. In his arbitration, Hayes awarded the region to Paraguay.

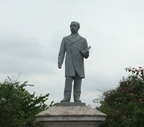
Monument of Benjamin Aceval

== Weather ==
Summer temperatures can reach 40 °C (104 °F), while in winter it can drop to 0 °C (32 °F). The average is 23 °C (73 °F).

== Demography ==
Benjamin Aceval has 16,248 inhabitants in total, of which 8,076 are men and 8,171 women, according to estimates by the Directorate General of Statistics, Census and Surveys.

== Economy ==
It is the district with the most farming activity in the department, with extensive sugarcane (caña dulce) plantations. It's the only district with a sugar mill in the Chaco, which produces organic sugar. Emphasis is also placed on the production of molasses or cane syrup.

In addition, there are poultry and dairy farms. The dairy factory produces pasteurized milk, yogurt, fresh milk and cheese. Chickens are bred especially for the market in the capital, Asunción.

A sawmill located in the area exports its timber to Europe.

== Tourism ==
The hills surrounding the area are of great attraction for tourists.

The old buildings of the city: the Municipality, the Bishopric and the sugar mill called Censi y Pirotta, can be visited.

The patronal feast is celebrated on August 30, the day of Santa Rosa de Lima, patron saint of Benjamin Aceval. On December 8, in the area of Cerrito, the Feast of the Immaculate Conception is celebrated.

In the plaza Mcal. Estigarribia there is a tajy or lapacho tree Tabebuia which Estigarribia planted himself, on August 30, 1940, a week before his death.

The old sugar mill, from around the 1800s, is a very interesting place to visit. The Toba Qom natives live in the area of Cerrito. They engage in crafts made of vegetable fibers producing bags, backpacks, belts, among other things, also handicrafts in clay. The handicrafts can be seen on display at around 2 km from the center of Benjamin Aceval.

== History ==
Benjamín Aceval was founded on April 30, 1859. The first settlers were European immigrants mostly from France and Belgium. Benjamin Aceval was originally called "Monte Sociedad" because its first inhabitants worked in partnership.

The most recognized European immigrant family names are: Richard, Mineur, Mochet Touchet, Cattebecke, Mouser, Etcheverry, Macci, Trepowski, Von Lepel, Orlandini, Petters, Salomón, Lampers, Minck, Blaires, Lahaye, De Witte, etc.

In 1940 this department was created by Act 436 of October 6. Paraguay recovered this territory through the ruling of President Rutherford B. Hayes who ruled in favor of Paraguay after the Paraguayan War. The naming honors the diplomatic efforts of Benjamin Aceval, who carried the documents to President Hayes.

Benjamin Aceval has two districts: Cerrito and Costa.

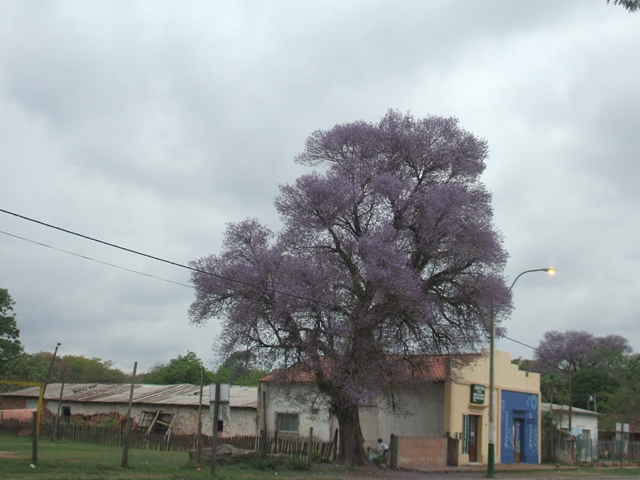
Street in Villa Hayes

== Schools ==
- The Agricultural School San Francisco in Cerrito company is a training centre for the whole community, administered by an NGO, Fundación Paraguaya, where they can host up to 150 people if there were workshops or full days on the farm school.
- The Colegio Parroquial Subvencionado Santa Rosa de Lima, is one of the most important schools in the city . Most of the politicians, artists, and professionals in the city are graduated from this school.
- The School Paí Pukú, open since 1995, is the dream of a group of farmers in the area, concerned about the future and maintenance of the María Medianera school (Pa'í Pukú). This center is dedicated to the education of children and youths, has primary and secondary school. It houses around 500 students. It has multi professional training workshops in carpentry, tailoring and cutting, domestic economy, organic gardens, rural health, hairdressing, computers, typing, electricity, beekeeping, among others.

In September there is a festival where folk art forms are prepared by students of the institution. There is typical food, and festivities are held countryside. Students offer Latin American dances in shows of brotherhood among peoples.

== Transportation ==
Benjamín Aceval is about 42 km from Asunción, the city is accessed by Route IX "Carlos Antonio López" also called the "Transchaco Road". There is a bus through town called "La Chaqueña".
