= Dionisio Borda =

Paraguayan politician

Dionisio Cornelio Borda (born 12 September 1949) is a politician from Paraguay. He was the Minister of Finance of Paraguay twice - under president Nicanor Duarte from August 2003 to May 2005 and under president Fernando Lugo from August 2008 to June 2012.
