= Benjamín Aceval (diplomat) =

Paraguayan statesman, educator and diplomat

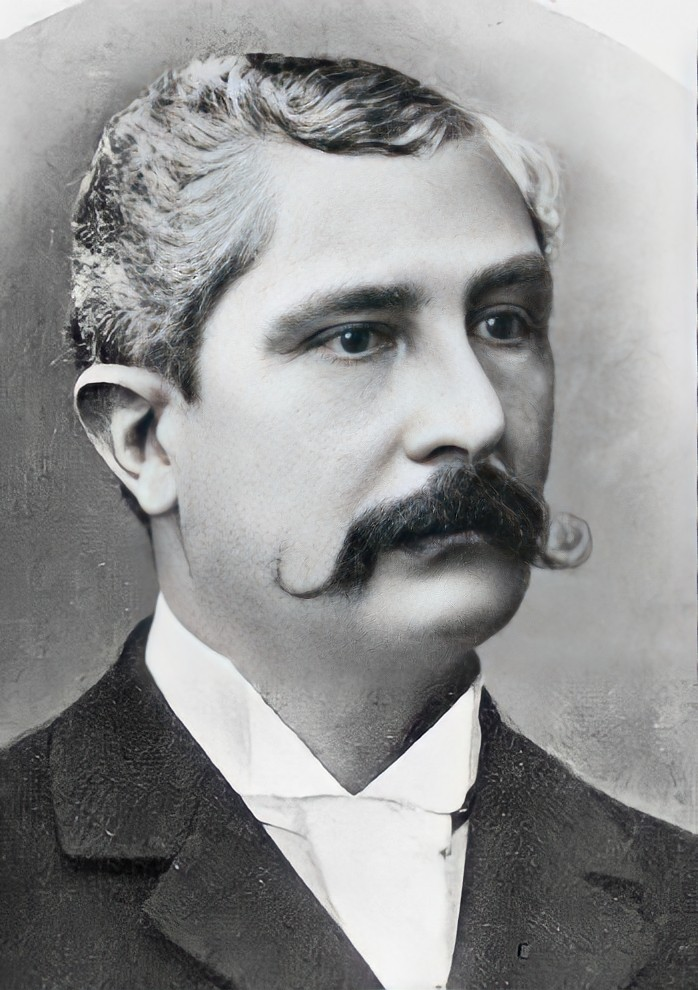
- Monument to Benjamín Aceval on his namesake city

Paraguayan Ambassador to the United States
- In office 1877–1879

Minister of Foreign Affairs of Paraguay
- In office 1877–1877
- Preceded by: Facundo Machaín
- Succeeded by: Juan Antonio Jara
- In office 1878–1880
- Preceded by: Juan Antonio Jara
- Succeeded by: José Segundo Decoud
- In office 1886–1887
- Preceded by: José Segundo Decoud
- Succeeded by: José Segundo Decoud

Personal details
- Born: Tomás Benjamín Aceval Marín; 1845 Asunción, Paraguay
- Died: July 25, 1900 (aged 54–55) Asunción, Paraguay
- Education: 1873 Doctor of Law of the University of Buenos Aires

Tomás Benjamín Aceval Marín (1845 – July 25, 1900) was a Paraguayan statesman, educator and diplomat.

== Career ==
He spent most of his youth in Argentina, where he finished his law studies in 1873.

1874 he was minister of justice in the Government of Juan Bautista Gill.

From 1877 to March 1879 he was Minister Plenipotentiary in special mission in Washington, D.C. and represented the government of Higinio Uriarte in the Chaco Boreal dispute with Argentina, after the Paraguayan War, to the President of the U.S.A. Rutherford B. Hayes. In his arbitration, Hayes awarded the region to Paraguay.

From March 1879 to 1886 he was rector of the Colegio Nacional de la Capital.

In 1886, he was foreign minister in the Government of Patricio Escobar.

On February 16, 1887 he negotiated with the Bolivian plenipotentiary Isaac Tamayo, the abortive Aceval-Tamayo Treaty.

He was Minister of Finance of Paraguay from 1895 to 1897.

He died of Bubonic plague, amidst an epidemic that hit Asunción.

Benjamín Aceval, a town in the Presidente Hayes Department in Paraguay, is named in his honor.
