= Mariano González (politician) =

Paraguayan politician (1808–1870)

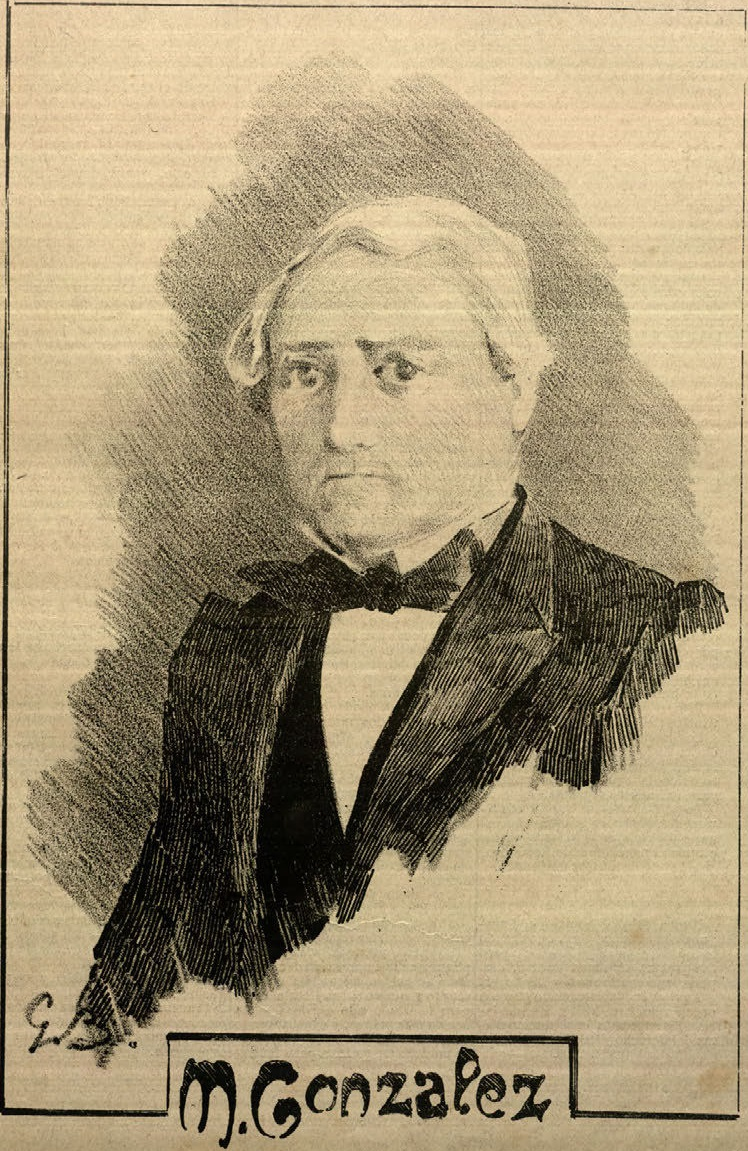
M. Gonzáles.

Mariano José González Fernández (23 March 1808, Asunción – February 1870, Cerro Corá) was the first vice president of Paraguay from 1845 to 1846. He was minister of finance from 1850 to 1869.

Preceded by Office created	Vice President of Paraguay; 1844–1854	Succeeded by Francisco Solano López
