= Adolfo Saguier =

Paraguayan politician (1832–1902)

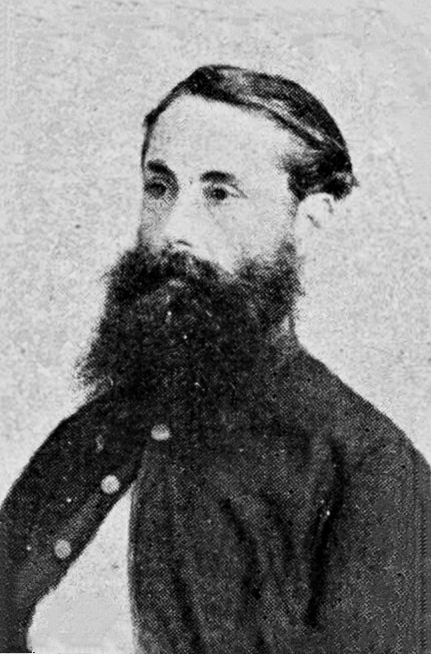

4th Vice President of Paraguay
- In office 25 November 1878 – 4 September 1880
- President: Cándido Bareiro
- Preceded by: Higinio Uriarte
- Succeeded by: Juan Antonio Jara

Personal details
- Born: 1832
- Died: 1902 (aged 69–70)

Adolfo Saguier (1832–1902) was a Paraguayan politician who served as the nation's Vice President from 1878 to 1880.

Adolfo was the brother of a former Paraguayan ambassador to Argentina and a cousin of Francisco Solano López. During the rule of Carlos Antonio López he was sent to study in Europe. During the Paraguayan War he served in the army and commanded artillery in the Battle of Curupayty. During the last years of Lopez’s rule he led one of the conspiracy trials that led to the arrest, torture and execution of alleged plotters against Lopez.

After the war he was associated with the Liberal politicians of the Decoud faction. He served as President of the Chamber of Deputies. He was Minister of Finance of Paraguay from 1875 to 1876.

Saguier was elected Vice President under Cándido Bareiro in 1878, and after the sudden death of Bareiro he was prevented from assuming Presidency by a bloodless coup organized by Bernardino Caballero on 4 September 1880. After Saguier was informed that Bareiro had died, he was led by Minister of War and Navy Pedro Duarte to a barracks, where he was told he would be named president. Instead, generals Caballero and Escobar were waiting with troops loyal to them—Saguier was forced to sign his own resignation. This document was presented to the Senate, and Caballero was named president.

Political offices
Preceded by Higinio Uriarte	Vice President of Paraguay; 1878–1880	Succeeded by Juan Antonio Jara
