= Minister of Finance (Paraguay) =

Person in charge of the Ministry of Finance, Paraguay

Minister of Finance is the person in charge of the Ministry of Finance of Paraguay.

== Ministers ==
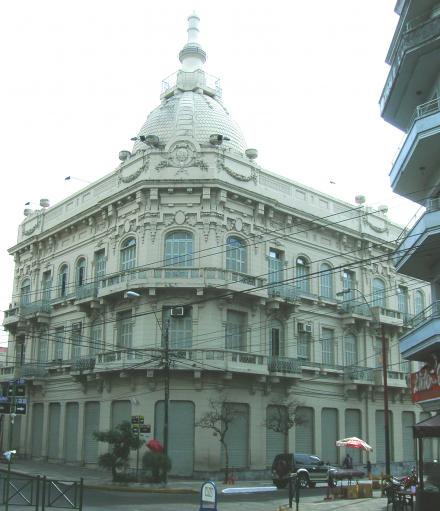
Ministry of Finance in Asunción

- José de Elizalde, 1811-1814
- Francisco Díaz de Bedoya, 1814-1819
- José Gabriel Benítez, 1819-1827
- Juan Manuel Álvarez, 1827-1844
- Benito Varela, 1844-1850
- Mariano González, 1850-1869
- José Díaz de Bedoya, 1869-1870
- Salvador Jovellanos, 1870
- Juan Bautista Gill, 1870-1871
- Pedro Recalde, 1871-1873
- Francisco Soteras, 1873
- Jaime Sosa Escalada, 1873-1874
- Juan Bautista Gill, 1874
- Emilio Gill, 1874-1875
- Adolfo Saguier, 1875-1876
- Cándido Bareiro, 1876-1878
- Juan Antonio Jara, 1878-1882
- Juan de la Cruz Giménez, 1882-1884
- Agustín Cañete, 1885-1887
- Higinio Uriarte, 1887-1889
- José Tomás Sosa, 1889-1890
- José Segundo Decoud, 1890-1891
- Esteban Rojas, 1892
- Otoniel Peña, 1892-1893
- Agustín Cañete, 1894-1895
- Benjamín Aceval, 1895-1897
- Agustín Cañete, 1897-1898
- Guillermo de los Ríos, 1898
- José Urdapilleta, 1898-1900
- Francisco Campos, 1900
- Fulgencio Ricardo Moreno, 1901-1904
- Juan Bautista Gaona, 1904
- Emiliano González Navero, 1904-1905
- Manuel Barrios, 1905
- Emiliano González Navero, 1905-1906
- Carlos Luis Isasi, 1906
- Adolfo Soler, 1906-1908
- Gualberto Cardús Huerta, 1908-1910
- Víctor Soler, 1910
- José Antonio Ortiz, 1910-1911
- Francisco Bareiro, 1911-1912
- Higinio Arbo, 1912
- Gerónimo Zubizarreta, 1912-1915
- José Montero, 1915-1916
- Eusebio Ayala, 1916
- Luis Alberto Riart, 1916-1917
- Francisco Sosa Gaona, 1917-1919
- Eusebio Ayala, 1919
- Pastor Ibáñez, 1919-1920
- Manuel Peña, 1920
- Eligio Ayala, 1920-1923
- Luis Alberto Riart, 1923-1924
- Eliseo Da Rosa, 1924
- Manuel Benítez, 1924-1927
- Rodolfo González, 1927-1928
- Eligio Ayala, 1928-1930
- Rodolfo González, 1930-1931
- Justo Pastor Benítez, 1931
- Luis Alberto Riart, 1931
- Geronimo Zubizarreta, 1931
- Justo Pastor Benitez, 1931
- Rodolfo González, 1931-1932
- Justo Pastor Benitez, 1932
- Benjamín Banks, 1932-1936
- Luis Freire Esteves, 1936
- Alfredo Jacquet, 1936
- Emilio Gardel, 1936-1937
- Luis Frescura, 1937-1938
- Enrique Bordenave, 1938-1939
- Justo Pastor Benítez, 1939
- Cipriano Codas, 1939-1940
- Justo Pastor Benítez, 1940
- Francisco Esculies, 1940
- Rogelio Espinoza, 1940-1944
- Juan Plate, 1944-1945
- Horacio Chiriani, 1945
- Alfonso Dos Santos, 1945-1946
- Agustín Ávila, 1946
- Juan Natalicio González, 1946-1948
- Leandro Prieto, 1948-1949
- Ramón Méndez Paiva, 1949-1952
- Guillermo Enciso Velloso, 1952-1954
- Antonio Saldívar, 1954
- Carlos Velilla, 1954-1956
- César Barrientos, 1956-1988
- Carlos Antonio Ortiz Ramírez, 1988
- Elvio Alonso Martino 1988-1989
- Enzo Debernardi, 1989-1991
- Juan José Díaz-Pérez, 1991-1993
- Crispiano Sandoval, 1993-1994
- Orlando Bareiro, 1994-1996
- Raúl Cubas Grau, 1996
- Carlos Facetti, 1996-1997
- Miguel Ángel Maidana Zayas, 1997-1998
- Gerardo Doll, 1998-1999
- Federico Zayas, 1999-2000
- Francisco Oviedo, 2000-2002
- James Spalding, 2002
- Alcides Giménez, 2002-2003
- Dionisio Borda, 2003-2005
- Ernest Bergen, 2005-2007
- César Barreto, 2007-2008
- Miguel Ángel Gómez, 2008
- Dionisio Borda, 2008-2012
- Manuel Ferreira Brusquetti, 2012-2013
- Germán Rojas, 2013-2015
- Santiago Peña, 2015-2017
- Lea Giménez, 2017-2018
- Benigno López, 2018-2020
- Oscar Llamosas Díaz, 2020-2023
- Carlos Gustavo Fernández Valdovinos, 2023-

== See also ==
- Government of Paraguay
