= Juan Antonio Jara =

Paraguayan politician and lawyer (1845-1887)

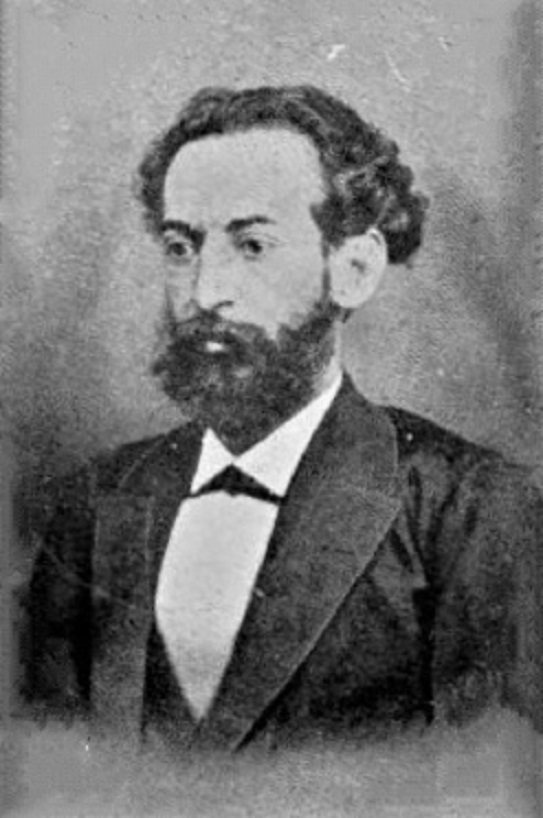

Vice President of Paraguay
- In office 25 November 1882 – 25 November 1886
- President: Bernardino Caballero
- Preceded by: Adolfo Saguier
- Succeeded by: José del Rosario Miranda

Senator of Paraguay
- In office 1882–1886

Minister of Finance of Paraguay
- In office 12 August 1878 – 10 July 1882
- Preceded by: Cándido Bareiro
- Succeeded by: Juan de la Cruz Giménez

Minister of Foreign Affairs of Paraguay
- In office 6 August 1877 – 9 July 1879
- Preceded by: Benjamín Aceval
- Succeeded by: Benjamín Aceval

Minister of Justice, Religion and Public Education of Paraguay
- In office 14 August 1877 – 16 August 1877
- Preceded by: Bernardino Caballero
- Succeeded by: Adolfo Saguier

Minister of the Paraguayan Supreme Court of Justice
- In office 1876 – 12 October 1877

National Deputy of Paraguay
- In office 27 February 1871 – 15 October 1871
- In office 4 April 1876 – 1877

Personal details
- Born: 1845 Asunción, Paraguay
- Died: July 21, 1887 (aged 41–42) Asunción, Paraguay
- Spouse: Marcelina Martínez
- Children: Tomás Antonio Jara Martínez

Juan Antonio Jara Pereira (1845 - 21 July 1887) was a Paraguayan politician and lawyer; he was vice president of Paraguay between 1882 and 1886, during Bernardino Caballero's presidency.

== Biography ==
Jara was born in 1845 in Asunción, from a family of landowners. He was sent to study in Paris and returned only in 1869, after the fall of Asunción at the closing stages of the Paraguayan War. Soon after, he began to be active in the country's politics, to write for its newspapers, to do commercial deals on yerba mate and to work as a lawyer; besides all that, he was named Attorney General in 1870. He would maintain that position until early 1871, when he was elected national deputy. Congress was dissolved by president Cirilo Antonio Rivarola in October 1871, and in the next elections in November 1871 he either didn't run, or wasn't reelected.

Between March and October 1874 he was Attorney General for a second time. In the second half of the 1870s, he was a deputy again, and then Minister of Finance and Minister of Foreign Affairs. Like the two Ministers of Finance that followed him, Juan de la Cruz Giménez and Agustín Cañete, he was accused of embezzlement during his stint at that ministry; Jara in particular had little operational knowledge of governmental finances when he took the position. He also was briefly named interim Minister of Justice in 1877, while he served a one year term as Minister of the Supreme Court.

Though he was general Bernardino Caballero's vice president from 1882 onwards, and had been in his bloc since the early 1870s, after the election he soon went to the oppositionists, with whom he formed a minority in the Senate and tried to contest perceived corruption in the government; during his entire vice presidency, he also was president of the senate. It was thus that in the 10th of July of 1887 he was one of the founders of the traditional Liberal Party, rival to Caballero's Colorado Party. He died shortly after, in the 21st of the same month.

One of Asunción's most important neighborhoods, Barrio Jara, is named after him, for he was the owner of most of the land that comprises it.

Preceded by Adolfo Saguier	Vice President of Paraguay; 1882 - 1886	Succeeded by José del Rosario Miranda
