= Higinio Uriarte =

Paraguayan politician (1843–1909)

José Higinio Uriarte del Barrio
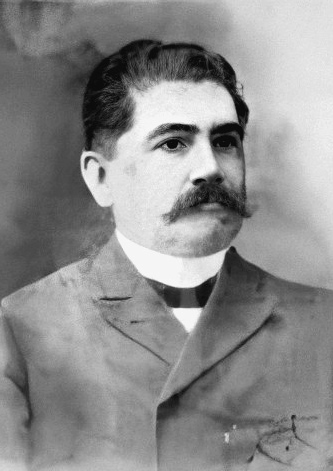
- Portrait, c. 1890

7th President of Paraguay
- In office 12 April 1877 – 25 November 1878
- Vice President: Vacant
- Preceded by: Juan Bautista Gill
- Succeeded by: Cándido Bareiro

3rd Vice President of Paraguay
- In office 25 November 1874 – 12 April 1877
- President: Juan Bautista Gill
- Preceded by: Salvador Jovellanos (1871)
- Succeeded by: Adolfo Saguier (1878)

Personal details
- Born: 11 January 1843 Asunción, Paraguay
- Died: 21 April 1909 (aged 66)
- Party: Independent
- Spouse: Etelvina Trinidad Mercedes Velilla
- Children: 2

José Higinio Uriarte y García del Barrio (11 January 1843 in Asunción – 21 April 1909) was a Paraguayan politician and President from 12 April 1877 to 25 November 1878.

He was Juan Bautista Gill's cousin. He served as President of the Chamber of Deputies, and was elected as Vice President 1874. After Gill was assassinated, Uriarte became the acting President for the remainder of Gill's four-year-term. He was Minister of Finance of Paraguay from 1887 to 1889.

Political offices
Preceded by Salvador Jovellanos	Vice President of Paraguay; 1874-1877	Succeeded by Adolfo Saguier
Preceded by Juan Bautista Gill	President of Paraguay; 1877-1878	Succeeded by Cándido Bareiro
