= Paraguayan Legion =

- Legión Paraguaya
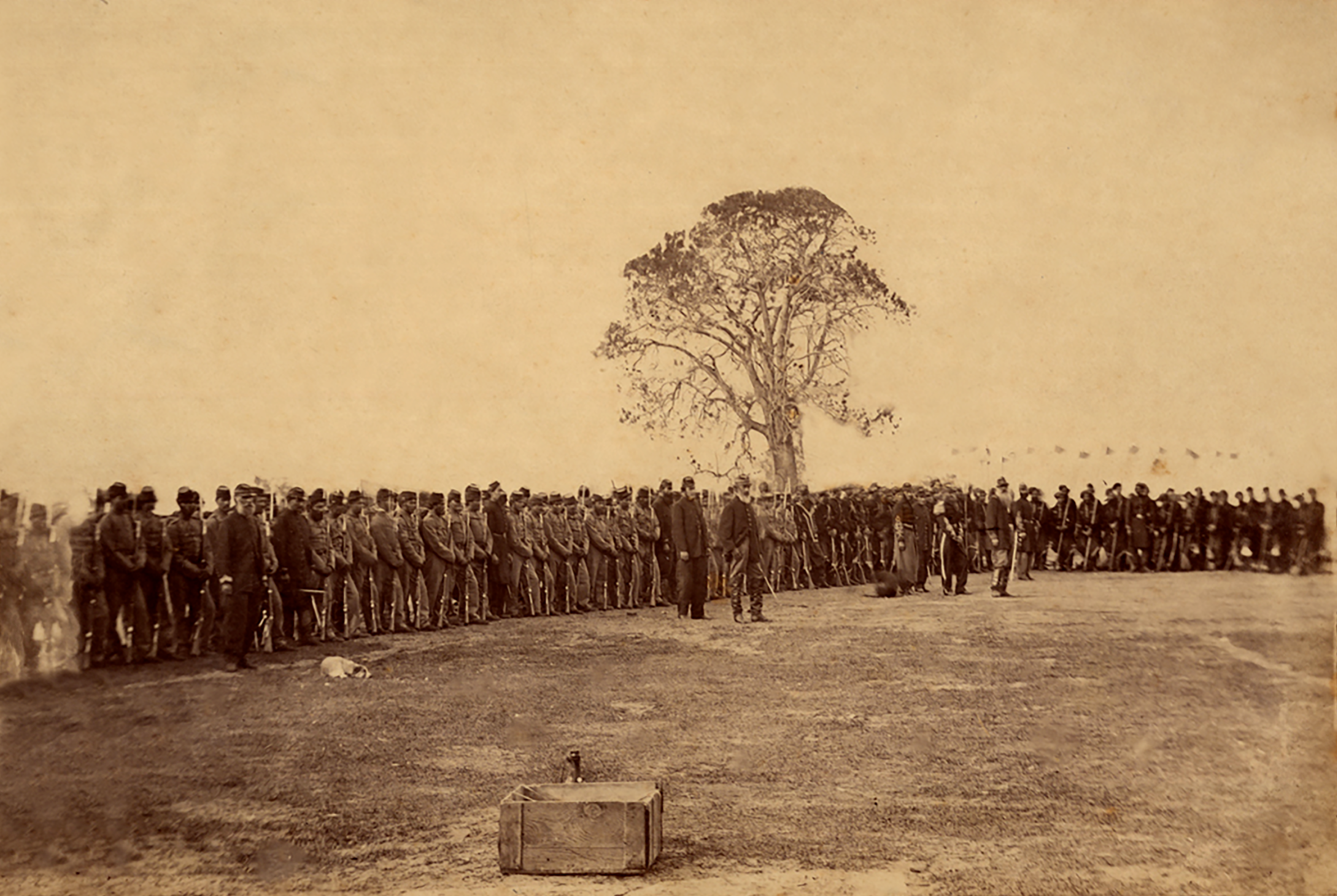
- The Paraguayan Legion in 1866
- Countries: Paraguay
- Allegiance: Argentina
- Type: Infantry
- Engagements: Paraguayan War

The Paraguayan Legion (Spanish: Legión Paraguaya), was a military unit led by colonels Juan Francisco Decoud and Fernando Iturburu that was formed in Argentina during the Paraguayan War, consisting mainly of Paraguayan exiles and opponents of the Francisco Solano López regime. Due to mistrust between the allied Argentina and Brazil, the Legion never developed into a strong fighting unit, as Brazilians distrusted this unit created by Argentina, though its organization had already been foreseen in the Treaty of the Triple Alliance signed between them in 1865. The legion started fighting, under a Paraguayan flag, only late in the war, either in March 1869 or by the battle of Pikysyry in December 1868; the war had started in 1864.

Legionnaires dominated the Paraguayan political scene during the liberal period of the first post-war years. The first Provisional government, the Triumvirate of 1869, included two Legionnaires: José Díaz de Bedoya and Carlos Loizaga. Other members of the unit would reach the country's presidency over the next few decades, such as Benigno Ferreira and Juan Bautista Egusquiza.

Politically, legionnaires quickly split into the Decoud faction and the Bareiro faction. The Decoud faction was involved in the formation of the Liberal Party in 1887. The former López supporters and nationalists who in 1887 established the Colorado Party, used this to portray the liberals as traitors, despite the fact that many signers of the 1887 Colorado founding manifesto were former legionnaires as well. Since then, the word legionario has taken the meaning of traitor in Paraguay, being used in speeches by figures such as Alfredo Stroessner and Juan Manuel Frutos to lambast their political adversaries.
