= 1870 Paraguayan Constitutional Assembly election =

- July 1870

Constitutional Assembly elections were held in Paraguay in July 1870. The Paraguayan Legion won a majority in the elections. The election campaign was characterized by street violence.

The constitution convention was held in August 1870.
