= Benigno Ferreira =

President of Paraguay from 1906 to 1908

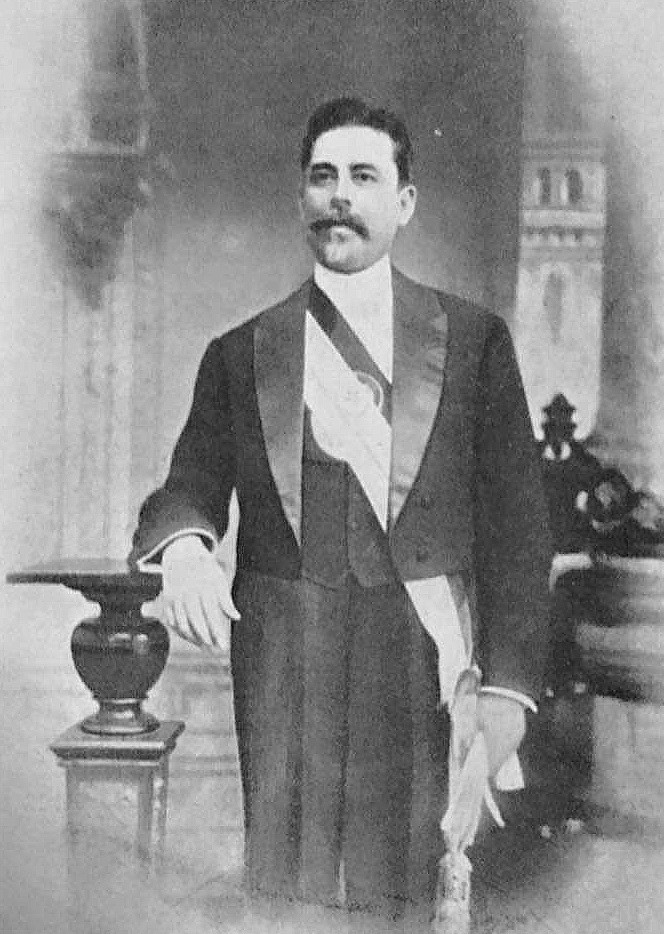

19th President of Paraguay
- In office November 25, 1906 – July 4, 1908
- Vice President: Emiliano González Navero
- Preceded by: Cecilio Báez
- Succeeded by: Emiliano González Navero

Personal details
- Born: January 13, 1846 Mora Cué, Paraguay
- Died: June 14, 1920 (aged 74) Buenos Aires, Argentina
- Party: Liberal

Benigno Asunción Ferreira (January 13, 1846 – June 14, 1920) was President of Paraguay from 1906 to his overthrow in a 1908 military coup. He was a member of the Liberal Party.

The general and doctor in law Benigno Ferrerira was one of the main protagonists in the postwar period of' ‘70 and one of the most respected political leaders of his era.

== Biography ==
=== Early life ===
Benigno was born January 13, 1846, in Mora Cué, a town which nowadays belongs to Limpio, the former Tapuá Grande. His parents were Joaquin Angel Mora Coene and María Concepción Ferreira; their marriage could not be legalized because of a lack of permission from the dictator Francia, then at the end of his life. Despite being a recognized son, Benigno chose to take the mother's maiden name. He had two sisters, Susana (married to Silvestre Aveiro) and Mercedes (married to Federico Guillermo Baez, former president of the Constitutional Convention of 1870).

The entry into the Colegio de San Carlos de Asunción was forbidden to young Benigno by order of Don Carlos Antonio López, president of the republic, as his father was a political opponent.

Historian Manuel Pesoa mentions that his godfather was the Argentine consul general Jose Tomas Ramirez, representing general Justo José de Urquiza, who allowed Benigno to study at the Colegio del Uruguay in the province of Entre Ríos, Argentina. There, Benigno Ferreira got to socialize with other young Argentines and Paraguayans.

He later moved to Buenos Aires to begin his studies of law at the University of Buenos Aires. His studies were interrupted by the outbreak of war against Paraguay in 1865.

=== Political career ===
The Paraguayan colony in Buenos Aires was formed by families who had left their homeland for political reasons. Influenced by the liberal ideas dominant in Buenos Aires at the time, they criticized the authoritarianism of the López (Carlos Antonio and Francisco Solano) and their heavy-handed police. A group of Paraguayan students began organizing a united front to fight the regime of Asunción. They published articles in the press in Buenos Aires and even signed manifestos. Ferreira himself was a full-fledged liberal.

All this activity was closely followed by Lopez's agents, who took harsh reprisals against Benigno's mother "due to the criminal conduct of her son." Mrs. Concepción was seized and tortured, so she would testify against her missing son. This was the context when the Triple Alliance War started, and as he joined the pro-Triple Alliance Paraguayan Legion at the age of 19.

When he learnt of the secret clause of the Treaty of the Triple Alliance, Benigno Ferreira reportedly appeared in person before General Urquiza to convey the following: "We have been deceived. The treaty of alliance is a disgrace to the signatory governments, an insult to my homeland and a mockery to civilization." Ferreira resigned and returned to Buenos Aires to devote himself to journalism in the newspaper "La Republica", in whose columns he lambasted the Alliance.

After the occupation of Asunción in 1869 by allied forces, Benigno Ferreira was appointed captain of the port of the capital. In September 1869 he joined the Freemasons. In the following month he was among the drafters of the newspaper "La Regeneración", the first in Paraguayan history to be wholly private. In 1870, he was elected member of the committee of “The Great People's Club” led by Facundo Machaín and a few days later assumed command of a battalion of National Guard with the rank of Sergeant Major.

An important character from an early age in Paraguayan politics, he became Minister of War and Navy in 1871 during the government of Cirilo Antonio Rivarola. In the troubled atmosphere of the reorganization of the Paraguayan State, he took over a seat in the Chamber of Deputies and later served as minister of Justice, being a key member of Salvador Jovellanos's government. He dealt with three armed revolts in the years ‘73 and ‘74. As a result of the last amongst these, he was forced to endure a long exile (1874–1895), a period in which he obtained a doctorate in law in Buenos Aires. He found upon his return a divided Liberal Party, this time between civics and radicals, the former favorable to political coexistence with the ruling Colorado Party, the latter against it.

He led the rebel forces in the civil war in 1904. When the new government was installed, he went back to the position of Minister of War and Navy and later became a member of the Supreme Court. On November 25, 1906, he took the first magistracy.

His Cabinet was composed of Emiliano González Navero as vice-president, Adolfo Soler as Minister of Finance, Manuel Brítez as Minister of the Interior, Carlos Isasi in the Ministry of Justice, Guillermo de los Rios as Minister for Religious Affairs and Public Instruction, Manuel Duarte as Minister of War and Navy and Cecilio Báez as Chancellor.

=== As President ===
His government established new telegraph lines, the Normal School moved to Villarica and the number of primary schools increased. He also closed military courses and built barracks in the towns of the countryside as well as a new building for the capital customs.

On the other hand, he settled a long conflict with the large railroad company, the Bank of the Republic was founded, the Soler-Pinilla Treaty with Bolivia was signed, and military equipment was acquired from Europe; the army had recently been rebuilt from the ground up after the 1904 Revolution.

The civics, his wing of the Liberal Party, were defeated in 1908 by a coalition of radical Liberals and Colorados, and Benigno Ferreira was forced to resign.

=== Later years ===
He marched into exile once again. He died in Buenos Aires in 1920. His coffin was transferred directly to the Government Palace in Asuncion for the wake.

Political offices
Preceded by Cecilio Báez	President of Paraguay; 1906–1908	Succeeded by Emiliano González Navero
