= Supreme Court of Justice of Paraguay =

Highest court of Paraguay

The Supreme Court of Justice of Paraguay (Spanish: Corte Suprema de Justicia del Paraguay) is the highest court of Paraguay. The Senate and the President of Paraguay select its nine ministers (judges) on the basis of recommendations from a constitutionally created Consejo de la Magistratura (Council of Magistrates). The court meets at the Palace of Justice in Asunción. The court consists of three chambers: Constitutional, Civil and Commercial and Criminal and each chamber has three ministers. The present President (Chief Justice) of the Supreme Court is César Diesel.

== Notable cases ==
- Mickey SRL. v. The Walt Disney Company

== Current composition ==
- Alberto Joaquín Martínez, president
- Luis M. Benítez Riera, first vicepresident
- Gustavo Santander Dans, second vicepresident
- César Antonio Garay
- Eugenio Jiménez Rolón
- Manuel Dejesús Ramírez
- María Carolina Llanes
- César Manuel Diese
- Víctor Ríos
