= Timeline of Paraguayan history =

Below is the timeline of Paraguayan history.

== Early colonial period (1516-1556) ==
1516: Conquistador Juan Díaz de Solís leads an unsuccessful expedition to explore the area later known as Paraguay.

1524: Portuguese explorer Aleixo Garcia leads a Guaraní army of 200 across the Gran Chaco.

1526: Navigator Sebastian Cabot sails up the River Paraná and establishes a settlement known as Sancti Spiritu.

1530: Conquistador Don Pedro de Mendoza attempts to reach the area, but fails at the banks of the River Plate. His second in command Juan de Ayolas sails up the River Paraguay and discovers Cabot's abandoned settlement. Domingo Martínez de Irala, another sailor, joins him and is appointed lieutenant to take charge of the region. Ayolas ventures into the Chaco and disappears.

1537: Explorers Juan de Salazar de Espinosa and Gonzalo de Mendoza sail upstream to meet Irala, who guides them to a safe port. A fort is constructed on the riverbank on August 15 and named Asunción for the Catholic feast day. It becomes an outpost for goods being shipped across the continent and later the colony's capital. Settlers are given the right to elect leaders of the colony.

1541: The garrison of Buenos Aires abandons the town and resettles in Asunción.

1542: The province of Paraguay placed under authority of Viceroyalty of Peru. Álvar Núñez Cabeza de Vaca appointed governor.

1543-44: War over the location of the seat of government breaks out. Vaca moves towards Lima, is defeated by natives and returns to Spain. Irala is re-appointed governor.

1544 - 1555: Irala modernizes Paraguay by introducing agriculture and local industry. He repairs relations with the natives.

1556: Irala dies.

== Jesuit era (1588-1767) ==
1588: Jesuits start their work on establishing Jesuit reductions for native Guaranis in the Governorate of Paraguay.

1589 - 1639: Mameluco slave raids ravish Paraguay until natives are given the right to bear arms and defend themselves.

1640 - 1720: Colonists and Guaranis prosper under the Jesuits in Paraguay.

1721 - 1732: Revolt of the Comuneros against the Jesuits. Revolt is defeated.

1750: Jesuits lose the support of the Spanish Crown.

1750 - 1761: Guaraní War. Spanish–Portuguese forces sack the Jesuit reductions, killing around 1500 Guaranís.

1767: Suppression of the Society of Jesus, the last Jesuits are expelled from colonial Paraguay.

== Royalist period (1776-1810) ==
1776: Viceroyalty of the Río de la Plata which includes the Province of Paraguay, is created.

1796 - 1806: Governor Lázaro de Ribera y Espinoza is in charge of Paraguay. Heavy taxes imposed by the Spanish provoke a popular revolt, which he suppresses by numerous executions.

1810: Royalism declines in South America as the king of Spain is deposed by Napoleon. May Revolution breaks out in the Viceroyalty. Governor of Paraguay Bernardo de Velasco remains loyal to the Crown and rejects revolution of Buenos Aires.

== Independence (1810-1813) ==
1810 - 1811: Buenos Aires starts Paraguay campaign. Argentine general Manuel Belgrano leads an army of 1100 troops to capture royalist Asunción, and defeats a small force of Paraguayans at the Battle of Campichuelo but is defeated in Battle of Paraguarí and Tacuarí.

1811, May 14 - Military and political uprising in Asuncion against governor Velasco. A three-man ruling junta, which includes Velasco, is created. This is the beginning of the independence of Paraguay.

1811, June 17 - National Congress meets for the first time. Velasco removed from all power and a five-man junta led by Fulgencio Yegros created.

1813 - National Congress creates the First Consulate with Fulgencio Yegros and Francia as consuls.

1813, October 12: Republic of Paraguay proclaimed.

== Francia era (1814-1840) ==
1814: Francia elected to the post of Supreme dictator.

1816: Francia elected to the post of Supremo dictator (El Supremo) for life.

1820 - 1821: Plot against Francia discovered. Independence leaders arrested. Caballero commits suicide in his cell and Yegros is executed. Spaniards of Asunción arrested and forced to pay 100,000 Pesos.

1824: Property of clergy confiscated.

1828: All private land confiscated. Education made compulsory.

1836: First public library opens.

1840: Francia dies. Manuel Antonio Ortiz leads the Provisional junta.

== Lopez dictatorships (1841-1870) ==
1841: Mariano Roque Alonzo assumes power, creates the Second Consulate with Carlos Antonio López.

1842, November 25: Official Act of Independence proclaimed.

1844: Carlos Antonio López elected president, establishes his dictatorship.

1862: Carlos Antonio Lopez dies and his eldest son Francisco Solano López is appointed president.

1864: Lopez declares war on Brazil, Argentina and Uruguay. Paraguayan War begins.

1865: Battle of the Riachuelo. Paraguayan navy destroyed. Remaining ships scuttled in the River Yhaguy.

1866: Battle of Tuyutí. Largest battle ever fought on South American soil. Allied advance halted by Paraguay at Curupayty.

1867: Fall of Humaitá. Allies begin march on Asunción.

1868: Paraguay defeated at the Battle of Avay. Paraguayan army begins to collapse.

1869, January 1: Allied armies occupy Asuncion, occupy Paraguay until 1876.

1869: Paraguayan army defeated at the Battle of Acosta Ñu. Lopez goes on the run with his wife Eliza Lynch and his children, as well as the remainder of his army, mostly children, elderly and women.

1870: Lopez finally defeated at Battle of Cerro Corá and killed soon after.

== Rebirth of Paraguay (1870-1880) ==
1870: Provisional government collapses, Cirilo Antonio Rivarola elected president.

1870: The 1870 Constitution is written.

1871: Salvador Jovellanos takes over after Rivarola's resignation.

1871: A revolt from veteran officers of the Triple Alliance War is aborted in Tacuaral.

1874: Juan Bautista Gill elected president, in the aftermath of revolts by Bernardino Caballero and Brazilian intervention.

1875: Riots break out in Caacupé, and soon spread all over the country. Rebellion quashed.

1877: President Gill is assassinated under orders from Juan Silvano Godoi. Higinio Uriarte takes over the presidency.

1878: Cándido Bareiro elected president.

1878: Juan Silvano Godoi tries to topple Bareiro with a gunboat, but is stopped while sailing up the Paraguay River by an Argentine Navy ship.

1880: Adolfo Saguier, Bareiro's vice-president is sidelined after Bareiro's death, with Bernardino Caballero taking over the presidency.

== The first Colorado period (1882-1902) ==
1882: Bernardino Caballero controversially elected president.

1886: Patricio Escobar elected president.

1887: Liberal Party and Colorado Party established.

1887: Bernhard Förster and his wife Elisabeth Förster-Nietzsche (sister of philosopher Friedrich Nietzsche) establish Nueva Germania settler community in the San Pedro Department.

1889: The National University is founded. Electric power installed for the first time in the country.

1890: President Juan Gualberto González is elected.

1891: A revolt by Liberal forces takes place in Asunción, but is quashed by Lieutenant Colonel Juan Bautista Egusquiza.

1894: González is toppled from power; Marcos Morínigo finishes his term.

1894: Juan Bautista Egusquiza is elected president.

1898: Emilio Aceval elected president.

1900, January 1: Metric system introduced.

1901, November 23: the first official football match held in Asuncion.

1902: Andrés Héctor Carvallo elected.

1902: The Caballero wing of the Colorado Party launches a coup, and Colonel Juan Antonio Escurra takes over the presidency.

== Liberal period (1904-1940) ==
1904: Escurra deposed in the 1904 Revolution; exiled to Villa Hayes. Juan Bautista Gaona elected president: the first liberal to be given such position.

1905: Cecilio Báez elected.

1906: Benigno Ferreira elected.

1908: Ferreira dismissed and exiled in coup. Emiliano González Navero elected. Paraguayan cities re-developed.

1911: Manuel Gondra elected.

1911: The First Paraguayan Civil War started; Manuel Gondra was toppled by Colonel Albino Jara, a radical liberal, but Jara's heavy-handedness during the months of conflicts with Gondra supporter forces cost him his popular support. He resigned in July, with Liberato Marcial Rojas taking the presidency.

1912: Liberato Marcial Rojas is toppled in a coup, but three days later is restored to power by another coup. Weeks later he resigns and Pedro Peña takes power, only to fall weeks later after the Gondrists succeed in taking over Asunción. Emiliano González Navero takes power.

1912, May 11: Albino Jara, who had begun to fight the Gondrists months earlier (and before that, the Rojas/Peña governments), is killed near Paraguarí, ending the civil war in a Gondrist victory.

1912: Eduardo Schaerer elected.

1915: Revolt against Schaerer caused by censorship issues fails.

1916: Manuel Franco elected.

1919: Franco dies in office. José Pedro Montero appointed.

1920: Gondra re-elected.

1921: Eusebio Ayala elected.

1922 - 23: The Second Paraguayan Civil War between conflicting factions erupts.

1924: Eligio Ayala elected, followed by Luis Alberto Riart, then again by Eligio Ayala.

1927: Arrival of Mennonites in Paraguay.

1928: José Patricio Guggiari elected.

1931: Taking of Encarnación, anarchist workers and students attempt to take control of Encarnación

1932: Eusebio Ayala re-elected. Bolivia declares war on Paraguay over control of the disputed Gran Chaco. Chaco War begins.

1932: The Paraguayan army defeats Bolivia at the Battle of Boquerón, but are defeated later at the Battle of Kilometer 7.

1933: First Battle of Nanawa. Paraguayans win, but are driven back at Campo Jordán. Paraguay re-captures Nanawa 5 months later. Stalemate breaks out at the Battle of Gondra, but is broken that October by the Paraguayans at 2nd Campo Grande, and re-capture the Chaco after the fall of Campo Vía. Ceasefire declared.

1934: Truce lifted, Bolivia re-launches offensive at the Battle of Cañada Strongest, but Paraguayans counterattack at Ybybobó.

1935: Attack at Bolivian strongpoint Villamontes fails. Bolivia accepts truce on June 12, 1935.

1936, February 17: The February Revolution brings Rafael Franco to power.

1937: Félix Paiva elected president after Franco and his supporters are ousted from power.

1939: José Félix Estigarribia is elected.

1940, September 7: Estigarribia is killed in a plane crash, general Higinio Moríñigo assumes power.

== Morínigo era (1941-1948) ==
1941: Morínigo bans all other political parties and un-sympathetic newspapers.

1945, February 8: Paraguay declares war on Germany, but does not see action.

1947: Morínigo manages to win Third Paraguayan Civil War, with the help of Colorado militias.

1948: Morínigo is overthrown and Juan Manuel Frutos inherits position of presidency, followed that year by Juan Natalicio González.

== Democracy restored (1949-1954) ==
1949: Raimundo Rolón is appointed president, followed by Felipe Molas López. Federico Chávez is elected full-term.

1954: Tomás Romero Pereira is elected. Hands over power to Alfredo Stroessner.

== Stroessner regime (1954-1989) ==
1955: Stroessner declares state of siege and removes various civil rights from the people.

1959: Achne tribe enslaved and wiped out by order of Stroessner.

1965-66: Assists USA in the invasion of the Dominican Republic.

1972: The University of Asunción is destroyed by police. The Archbishop of Paraguay, Ismael Rolón Silvero, excommunicates chief of police and minister of the interior.

1974: Human rights abuses in Paraguay come to notice internationally, and Stroessner is accused of slavery, genocide [of tribes], corruption, torture and kidnapping, as well as supposedly protecting ex-Nazis living in Paraguay.

1988: Pope John Paul II visits Paraguay, increasing anti-Stroessner morale.

1989: General Andrés Rodríguez starts an uprising against Stroessner, and succeeds after an artillery duel over Asunción, after which Stroessner flees to Brazil. Rodriguez appointed president after 35 years of dictatorship.

== Modern period (1989-present) ==
1992: Rodriguez initiated reforms including the abolition of the death penalty. He releases many political prisoners and slaves. He prosecuted and imprisoned the main personalities of Stroessner's regime.

1993: Juan Carlos Wasmosy is elected president. He frees several of Stroessner's associates from prison and reappoints them to their former government positions.

1996: General Lino Oviedo mounts a failed coup against Wasmosy. He is imprisoned.

1998: Raúl Cubas Grau elected under promise that Oviedo would be released, but does not perpetrate action. After his vice president Luis María Argaña is murdered with Cubas himself implicated, mass protests erupt in Asunción, with seven people killed by riot police.

1999: Cubas resigns. Oviedo flees to Argentina. Luis Ángel González Macchi elected president.

2003: Nicanor Duarte is elected president.

2004: Fire breaks out in the Ycuá Bolaños supermarket. 400 people killed and 500 injured.

2008: Fernando Lugo is elected president. After a 66-year era of continuous rule, the Colorado Party was ousted from power.

2012: Impeachment of Fernando Lugo. Federico Franco takes over.

2013: Horacio Cartes is elected president in a return to power of the Colorado Party.

2018: Mario Abdo Benítez is elected president. His father was Stroessner's secretary.

2023: Santiago Peña is elected president.
