= List of heads of state of Paraguay =

This article contains a list of heads of state of Paraguay since its independence in 1811 to the present day.

== Background ==
After Paraguay proclaimed independence from the Viceroyalty of the Río de la Plata, its first effective head of state was utopist José Gaspar Rodríguez de Francia. He ruled the country from 1814 until his death in 1840, ensuring very little outside contact or influence.

Since the establishment of the office of President of the Republic in 1844, during the family dictatorship of the López family (1841–1870), Paraguay had 51 presidents. Between the end of the Paraguayan War in 1870 and the 1954 coup d'état, the country had 44 presidents; 24 of them were forcefully removed from power. Eventually, Army General Alfredo Stroessner, supported by the Armed Forces and the right-wing Colorado Party, seized power in the 1954 coup d'état. Relying on the military and the party as the "twin pillars" of his rule, and ruling in the single-party system until 1962, Stroessner was elected for eight consecutive terms before being ousted in the 1989 coup d'état. His 35-year-long rule was one of the longest in history by a non-royal leader.

== List of heads of state of Paraguay (1811–present) ==
=== Non-presidential heads of state (1811–1844) ===
Portrait	Name (Birth–Death)	Term of office			Notes
Portrait	Name (Birth–Death)	Start	End	Tenure	Notes
	Bernardo de Velasco José Gaspar Rodríguez de Francia Juan Valeriano de Zevallos	16 May 1811	17 June 1811	32 days	Governor Intendants.
	Fulgencio Yegros (1780–1821)	17 June 1811	12 October 1813	2 years, 117 days	President of the Superior Governing Junta.
	José Gaspar Rodríguez de Francia (1766–1840)	12 October 1813	12 February 1814	123 days	Consul of the Republic.
	Fulgencio Yegros (1780–1821)	12 February 1814	12 June 1814	120 days	Consul of the Republic.
	José Gaspar Rodríguez de Francia (1766–1840)	12 June 1814	3 October 1814	26 years, 100 days	Consul of the Republic.
	José Gaspar Rodríguez de Francia (1766–1840)	3 October 1814	30 May 1816	26 years, 100 days	Supreme Dictator.
	José Gaspar Rodríguez de Francia (1766–1840)	30 May 1816	20 September 1840	26 years, 100 days	Perpetual Dictator. Died in office.
	Manuel Antonio Ortiz (?–?)	20 September 1840	22 January 1841	123 days	President of the Provisional Junta.
	Juan José Medina José Gabriel Benítez José Campos	22 January 1841	9 February 1841	19 days	Triumvirate.
	Mariano Roque Alonzo (?–1853)	9 February 1841	12 March 1841	31 days	General Commander of Arms.
	Carlos Antonio López Mariano Roque Alonzo	12 March 1841	13 March 1844	3 years, 1 day	Consuls of the Republic.

=== Presidents (1844–present) ===
Portrait	Name (Birth–Death)	Term of office			Party	Election	Notes	Vice President
Portrait	Name (Birth–Death)	Start	End	Tenure	Party	Election	Notes	Vice President
	Carlos Antonio López (1792–1862)	13 March 1844	13 March 1854	18 years, 181 days	—	—	Elected by the Congress for a term of ten years.	Post not established
	Carlos Antonio López (1792–1862)	13 March 1854	13 March 1857	18 years, 181 days	—	—	Elected by the Congress for a term of three years.	Post not established
	Carlos Antonio López (1792–1862)	13 March 1857	10 September 1862	18 years, 181 days	—	—	Elected by the Congress for a term of ten years. Died in office.	Post not established
	Francisco Solano López (1827–1870)	10 September 1862	16 October 1862	7 years, 172 days	—	—	Interim President appointed by the Congress.	Post not established
	Francisco Solano López (1827–1870)	16 October 1862	1 March 1870	7 years, 172 days	—	—	Elected by the Congress for a term of ten years. Killed in the Paraguayan War.	Post not established
	Cirilo Antonio Rivarola Carlos Loizaga José Díaz de Bedoya	15 August 1869	31 August 1870	1 year, 16 days	—	—	Triumvirate proclaimed by the occupying forces of the Triple Alliance.	Post not established
	Facundo Machaín (1845–1877)	31 August 1870	1 September 1870	1 day	—	—	Interim President appointed by the Congress. Deposed in a coup.	Post not established
	Cirilo Antonio Rivarola (1836–1878)	1 September 1870	25 November 1870	1 year, 108 days	—	—	Interim President appointed by the Congress after a coup.	Post not established
	Cirilo Antonio Rivarola (1836–1878)	25 November 1870	18 December 1871	1 year, 108 days	—	1870	Resigned.	Cayo Miltos (Note: 25 November 1870 – 7 January 1871. Died in office.)
	Cirilo Antonio Rivarola (1836–1878)	25 November 1870	18 December 1871	1 year, 108 days	—	1870	Resigned.	Vacant (Note: 7 January 1871 – 9 December 1871.)
	Cirilo Antonio Rivarola (1836–1878)	25 November 1870	18 December 1871	1 year, 108 days	—	1870	Resigned.	Salvador Jovellanos (Note: 9 December 1871 – 18 December 1871. Appointed by the Congress.)
	Salvador Jovellanos (1833–1881)	18 December 1871	25 November 1874	2 years, 342 days	—	—	Vice President under Cirilo Antonio Rivarola, assumed the presidency after his resignation. Finished the presidential period 1870-1874.	Vacant
	Juan Bautista Gill (1840–1877)	25 November 1874	12 April 1877	2 years, 138 days	—	1874	Assassinated.	Higinio Uriarte
	Higinio Uriarte (1843–1909)	12 April 1877	25 November 1878	1 year, 227 days	—	—	Vice President under Juan Bautista Gill, assumed the presidency after his assassination. Finished the presidential period 1874-1878.	Vacant
	Cándido Bareiro (1833–1880)	25 November 1878	4 September 1880	1 year, 284 days	—	1878	Died in office.	Adolfo Saguier
	Bernardino Caballero (1839–1912)	4 September 1880	25 November 1882	6 years, 82 days	—	—	Interim President appointed by the Congress after the Vice President under Bareiro, Adolfo Saguier, and next president in the succession line, was forced to resign by the military. Finished the presidential period 1878-1882.	Vacant
	Bernardino Caballero (1839–1912)	25 November 1882	25 November 1886	6 years, 82 days	—	1882		Juan Antonio Jara
	Patricio Escobar (1843–1912)	25 November 1886	25 November 1890	4 years, 0 days	ANR-Colorado	1886		José del Rosario Miranda
	Juan Gualberto González (1851–1912)	25 November 1890	9 June 1894	3 years, 196 days	ANR-Colorado	1890	Forced to resign by a coup.	Marcos Morínigo
	Marcos Morínigo (1848–1901)	9 June 1894	25 November 1894	169 days	ANR-Colorado	—	Vice President under Juan Gualberto González, assumed the presidency after his resignation. Finished the presidential period 1890-1894.	Vacant
	Juan Bautista Egusquiza (1845–1902)	25 November 1894	25 November 1898	4 years, 0 days	ANR-Colorado	1894		Facundo Ynsfrán Caballero
	Emilio Aceval (1853–1931)	25 November 1898	9 January 1902	3 years, 45 days	ANR-Colorado	1898	Forced to resign by a coup.	Andrés Héctor Carvallo
	Andrés Héctor Carvallo (1862–1934)	9 January 1902	25 November 1902	320 days	ANR-Colorado	—	Vice President under Emilio Aceval, assumed the presidency after his resignation. Finished the presidential period 1898-1902.	Vacant
	Juan Antonio Escurra (1859–1929)	25 November 1902	19 December 1904	2 years, 24 days	ANR-Colorado	1902	Deposed in a coup.	Manuel Domínguez
	Juan Bautista Gaona (1845–1932)	19 December 1904	9 December 1905	355 days	Liberal	—	Interim President appointed by the Congress after Escurra and his Vice President, Manuel Domínguez, resigned in the coup. Deposed in a coup.	Vacant
	Cecilio Báez (1862–1941)	9 December 1905	25 November 1906	351 days	Liberal	—	Interim President appointed by the Congress. Finished the presidential period 1902-1906.	Vacant
	Benigno Ferreira (1946–1920)	25 November 1906	4 July 1908	1 year, 222 days	Liberal	1906	Deposed in a coup.	Emiliano González Navero
	Emiliano González Navero (1861–1934)	4 July 1908	25 November 1910	2 years, 144 days	Liberal	—	Vice President under Benigno Ferreira, assumed the presidency after the coup. Finished the presidential period 1906-1910. First term.	Vacant
	Manuel Gondra (1871–1927)	25 November 1910	17 January 1911	53 days	Liberal	1910	First term. Deposed in a coup.	Juan Bautista Gaona
	Albino Jara (1877–1912)	17 January 1911	5 July 1911	169 days	Liberal	—	De facto president after a coup. Resigned.	Vacant
	Liberato Marcial Rojas (1870–1922)	5 July 1911	14 January 1912	2 years, 193 days	Liberal	—	Interim President appointed by the Congress. Deposed in a coup.	Vacant
	Marcos Caballero Codas Mario Uscher Alfredo Aponte	14 January 1912	17 January 1912	3 days	—	—	De facto triumvirate after a coup.	Vacant
	Liberato Marcial Rojas (1870–1922)	17 January 1912	28 February 1912	42 days	Liberal	—	Restoration of its original mandate. Deposed in a coup.	Vacant
	Pedro Pablo Peña (1864–1943)	28 February 1912	22 March 1912	23 days	ANR-Colorado	—	Interim President appointed by the Congress. Deposed in a coup.	Vacant
	Emiliano González Navero (1861–1934)	22 March 1912	15 August 1912	146 days	Liberal	—	Interim President appointed by the Congress. Second term.	Vacant
	Eduardo Schaerer (1873–1941)	15 August 1912	15 August 1916	4 years, 0 days	Liberal	1912		Pedro Bobadilla
	Manuel Franco (1871–1919)	15 August 1916	5 June 1919	2 years, 294 days	Liberal	1916	Died in office.	José Pedro Montero
	José Pedro Montero (1878–1927)	5 June 1919	15 August 1920	1 year, 71 days	Liberal	—	Vice President under Manuel Franco, assumed the presidency after his death. Finished the presidential period 1916-1920.	Vacant
	Manuel Gondra (1871–1927)	15 August 1920	29 October 1921	1 year, 75 days	Liberal	1920	Second term. Resigned.	Félix Paiva
	Félix Paiva (1877–1965)	29 October 1921	7 November 1921	9 days	Liberal	—	Vice President under Manuel Gondra, assumed the presidency after his resignation. First term. Resigned.	Vacant
	Eusebio Ayala (1875–1942)	7 November 1921	12 April 1923	1 year, 156 days	Liberal	—	Interim President appointed by the Congress. First term. Resigned during in the Civil War of 1922.	Vacant
	Eligio Ayala (1879–1930)	12 April 1923	17 March 1924	340 days	Liberal	—	Interim President appointed by the Congress. First term. Resigned.	Vacant
	Luis Alberto Riart (1880–1953)	17 March 1924	15 August 1924	151 days	Liberal	—	Interim President appointed by the Congress. Finished the presidential period 1920-1924.	Vacant
	Eligio Ayala (1879–1930)	15 August 1924	15 August 1928	4 years, 0 days	Liberal	1924	Second term.	Manuel Burgos
	José Patricio Guggiari (1884–1957)	15 August 1928	25 October 1931	3 years, 71 days	Liberal	1928	Resigned to stand an impeachment.	Emiliano González Navero
	Emiliano González Navero (1861–1934)	25 October 1931	27 January 1932	94 days	Liberal	—	Vice President under José Patricio Guggiari, assumed the presidency during his impeachment. Third term.	Vacant
	José Patricio Guggiari (1884–1957)	27 January 1932	15 August 1932	201 days	Liberal	—	Restoration of its original mandate after being absolved from impeachment.	Emiliano González Navero
	Eusebio Ayala (1875–1942)	15 August 1932	17 February 1936	3 years, 186 days	Liberal	1932	Second term. Paraguayan victory in the Chaco War. Deposed after the Febrerista Revolution.	Raúl Casal Ribeiro
	Rafael Franco (1896–1973)	17 February 1936	13 August 1937	1 year, 179 days	Military	—	De facto president after a coup. Deposed after a coup.	Vacant
	Félix Paiva (1877–1965)	13 August 1937	11 October 1938	2 years, 0 days	Liberal	—	De facto president after a coup. Second term.	Vacant
	Félix Paiva (1877–1965)	11 October 1938	15 August 1939	2 years, 0 days	Liberal	—	Interim President appointed by the Congress.	Vacant
	José Félix Estigarribia (1888–1940)	15 August 1939	18 February 1940	1 year, 23 days	Liberal	1939		Luis Alberto Riart
	José Félix Estigarribia (1888–1940)	18 February 1940	7 September 1940	1 year, 23 days	Liberal	—	De facto president after a self-coup. The new Constitution of 1940 increased the presidential term from 4 to 5 years, allowed a single consecutive reelection, removed the Electoral College and the Vice President post. Died in a plane crash.	Vacant (Note: 18 February 1940 – 10 July 1940. The post of Vice President is abolished with the Constitution of 1940.)
	José Félix Estigarribia (1888–1940)	18 February 1940	7 September 1940	1 year, 23 days	Liberal	—	De facto president after a self-coup. The new Constitution of 1940 increased the presidential term from 4 to 5 years, allowed a single consecutive reelection, removed the Electoral College and the Vice President post. Died in a plane crash.	Post abolished (Note: 10 July 1940 – 15 August 1993.)
	Higinio Morínigo (1897–1983)	7 September 1940	15 August 1943	7 years, 270 days	—	—	Interim President appointed by the Congress. Finished the presidential period 1939-1943.	Post abolished
	Higinio Morínigo (1897–1983)	15 August 1943	3 June 1948	7 years, 270 days	—	1943	Deposed in a coup.	Post abolished
	Juan Manuel Frutos (1879–1960)	3 June 1948	15 August 1948	73 days	ANR-Colorado	—	Interim President appointed by the Congress. Finished the presidential period 1943-1948.	Post abolished
	Juan Natalicio González (1897–1966)	15 August 1948	30 January 1949	168 days	ANR-Colorado	1948	Deposed in a coup.	Post abolished
	Raimundo Rolón (1903–1981)	30 January 1949	26 February 1949	27 days	ANR-Colorado	—	Interim President appointed by the Congress. Deposed in a coup.	Post abolished
	Felipe Molas López (1901–1954)	26 February 1949	14 May 1949	197 days	ANR-Colorado	—	De facto president after a coup.	Post abolished
	Felipe Molas López (1901–1954)	14 May 1949	11 September 1949	197 days	ANR-Colorado	1949	Elected to finish the presidential period 1948-1953. Deposed in a coup.	Post abolished
	Federico Chaves (1882–1978)	11 September 1949	15 August 1953	4 years, 235 days	ANR-Colorado	—	Interim President appointed by the Congress. Finished the presidential period 1948-1953.	Post abolished
	Federico Chaves (1882–1978)	15 August 1953	4 May 1954	4 years, 235 days	ANR-Colorado	1953	Deposed in a coup d'état.	Post abolished
							There was no president in this period.	Post abolished
	Tomás Romero Pereira (1886–1982)	8 May 1954	15 August 1954	99 days	ANR-Colorado	—	Interim President appointed by the Congress.	Post abolished
	Alfredo Stroessner (1912–2006)	15 August 1954	15 August 1958	34 years, 172 days	ANR-Colorado	1954	Elected to finish the presidential period 1953-1958.	Post abolished
	Alfredo Stroessner (1912–2006)	15 August 1958	15 August 1963	34 years, 172 days	ANR-Colorado	1958		Post abolished
	Alfredo Stroessner (1912–2006)	15 August 1963	15 August 1968	34 years, 172 days	ANR-Colorado	1963	The new Constitution of 1967 allowed Stroessner to run for two more elections.	Post abolished
	Alfredo Stroessner (1912–2006)	15 August 1968	15 August 1973	34 years, 172 days	ANR-Colorado	1968		Post abolished
	Alfredo Stroessner (1912–2006)	15 August 1973	15 August 1978	34 years, 172 days	ANR-Colorado	1973	The Constitutional Amendment of 1977 allowed indefinite reelections.	Post abolished
	Alfredo Stroessner (1912–2006)	15 August 1978	15 August 1983	34 years, 172 days	ANR-Colorado	1978		Post abolished
	Alfredo Stroessner (1912–2006)	15 August 1983	15 August 1988	34 years, 172 days	ANR-Colorado	1983		Post abolished
	Alfredo Stroessner (1912–2006)	15 August 1988	3 February 1989	34 years, 172 days	ANR-Colorado	1988	Deposed in a coup d'état.	Post abolished
	Andrés Rodríguez (1923–1997)	3 February 1989	15 May 1989	4 years, 193 days	ANR-Colorado	—	De facto president after a coup.	Post abolished
	Andrés Rodríguez (1923–1997)	15 May 1989	15 August 1993	4 years, 193 days	ANR-Colorado	1989	The new Constitution of 1992 removed the possibility of reelection and reinstated the Vice President post. Elected to finish the presidential period 1988-1993.	Post abolished
	Juan Carlos Wasmosy (1938–)	15 August 1993	15 August 1998	5 years, 0 days	ANR-Colorado	1993		Ángel Seifart
	Raúl Cubas Grau (1943–)	15 August 1998	28 March 1999	225 days	ANR-Colorado	1998	Resigned as a result of the Marzo paraguayo.	Luis María Argaña (Note: 15 August 1998 – 23 March 1999. Assassinated.)
	Raúl Cubas Grau (1943–)	15 August 1998	28 March 1999	225 days	ANR-Colorado	1998	Resigned as a result of the Marzo paraguayo.	Vacant (Note: 23 March 1999 – 2 September 2000.)
	Luis Ángel González Macchi (1947–)	28 March 1999	15 August 2003	4 years, 140 days	ANR-Colorado	—	President of the Senate, as the Vice President, Luis María Argaña, was assassinated 5 days before. Finished the presidential period 1998-2003.	Vacant
	Luis Ángel González Macchi (1947–)	28 March 1999	15 August 2003	4 years, 140 days	ANR-Colorado	—	President of the Senate, as the Vice President, Luis María Argaña, was assassinated 5 days before. Finished the presidential period 1998-2003.	Julio César Franco (Note: 2 September 2000 – 16 October 2002. Elected in 2000. Resigned to run for presidency.)
	Luis Ángel González Macchi (1947–)	28 March 1999	15 August 2003	4 years, 140 days	ANR-Colorado	—	President of the Senate, as the Vice President, Luis María Argaña, was assassinated 5 days before. Finished the presidential period 1998-2003.	Vacant (Note: 16 October 2002 – 15 August 2003.)
	Nicanor Duarte (1956–)	15 August 2003	15 August 2008	5 years, 0 days	ANR-Colorado	2003		Luis Alberto Castiglioni (Note: 15 August 2003 – 4 October 2007. Resigned to run for presidency.)
	Nicanor Duarte (1956–)	15 August 2003	15 August 2008	5 years, 0 days	ANR-Colorado	2003		Vacant (Note: 4 October 2007 – 21 November 2007.)
	Nicanor Duarte (1956–)	15 August 2003	15 August 2008	5 years, 0 days	ANR-Colorado	2003		Francisco Oviedo (Note: 21 November 2007 – 15 August 2008. Appointed by the Congress.)
	Fernando Lugo (1951–)	15 August 2008	22 June 2012 (impeached)	3 years, 312 days	Christian Democratic	2008	Impeached.	Federico Franco
	Federico Franco (1962–)	22 June 2012	15 August 2013	1 year, 54 days	Authentic Radical Liberal	—	Vice President under Fernando Lugo, assumed the presidency after his impeachment. Finished the presidential period 2008-2013.	Vacant (Note: 22 June 2012 – 27 June 2012.)
	Federico Franco (1962–)	22 June 2012	15 August 2013	1 year, 54 days	Authentic Radical Liberal	—	Vice President under Fernando Lugo, assumed the presidency after his impeachment. Finished the presidential period 2008-2013.	Óscar Denis (Note: 27 June 2012 – 15 August 2013. Appointed by the Congress.)
	Horacio Cartes (1956–)	15 August 2013	15 August 2018	5 years, 0 days	ANR-Colorado	2013		Juan Afara (Note: 15 August 2013 – 11 April 2018. Resigned to run for Senator.)
	Horacio Cartes (1956–)	15 August 2013	15 August 2018	5 years, 0 days	ANR-Colorado	2013		Vacant (Note: 11 April 2018 – 9 May 2018.)
	Horacio Cartes (1956–)	15 August 2013	15 August 2018	5 years, 0 days	ANR-Colorado	2013		Alicia Pucheta (Note: 9 May 2018 – 15 August 2018. Appointed by the Congress.)
	Mario Abdo Benítez (1971–)	15 August 2018	15 August 2023	5 years, 0 days	ANR-Colorado	2018		Hugo Velázquez Moreno
	Santiago Peña (1978–)	15 August 2023	6 November 2026 (impeached)	3 years, 83 days	ANR-Colorado	2023		Pedro Alliana
	Pedro Alliana (1974–)	6 November 2026	Incumbent	16 days	ANR-Colorado	—	Vice President under Santiago Peña, assumed the presidency after his impeachment.	Antonio Barrios

== See also ==
- President of Paraguay
- History of Paraguay
- Politics of Paraguay
