= List of wars involving Paraguay =

This is a list of wars involving the Republic of Paraguay from 1810 to the present day. (Note: It is considered that Paraguayan independence starts in the Congress of July 24, 1810, when the Paraguayan "intendencia" refused to pledge allegiance to the Junta de Buenos Aires.)

Conflict	Combatant 1	Combatant 2	Result	President
Paraguayan Campaign (1810–1811)	(Spain) Spanish Empire: (Spain) Intendancy of Paraguay (Loyalists and Patriots)	Río de la Plata (Revolutionaries)	Victory: Paraguay retains independence from the Revolutionary Primera Junta of Buenos Aires; Paraguay would obtain independence from Spain afterwards	Bernardo de Velasco (as Governor of the Intendencia of Paraguay and Misiones)
Battle of Candelaria (1815)	Paraguay	Misiones; Río de la Plata	Defeat: Paraguayan invasion repelled	Gaspar Rodríguez de Francia (as Perpetual Dictator of Paraguay)
Paraguayan Incursion in Corrientes (1821–1823)	Paraguay	Corrientes	Victory: Paraguay seizes territory from Corrientes	Gaspar Rodríguez de Francia (as Perpetual Dictator of Paraguay)
Correntine-Paraguayan War (1833)	Paraguay	Corrientes	Victory: Paraguay slightly expands its territory in Corrientes and Misiones	Gaspar Rodríguez de Francia (as Perpetual Dictator of Paraguay)
Platine War (1845–1852) (Note: Paraguay held its own conflict against Juan Manuel de Rosas receiving very substantial support from the Empire of Brazil. President Carlos Antonio López declared war against Rosas and in the first phase of the "Paraguayan front" (1845–1846), Paraguay invaded the Province of Corrientes hoping to cause a rebellion alongside the Argentine dissidents led by Gen. José María Paz, which fared poorly. In the second phase however (1847–1850), the Paraguayans under Gen. Francisco Solano López occupied the Province of Misiones which was under Rosas' rule, resisting in their positions while suffering heavy losses against the counterattacks of the forces of Buenos Aires. See: Urdapilleta, Emilio (10 April 2021): "Guerra del Paraguay contra Rosas (1845-1852)". El Parlante Digital. Asunción, Paraguay. Retrieved: 16 April 2021. Link: https://elparlante.com.py/historia-del-paraguay/guerra-de-paraguay-contra-rosas-1845-1852/ The friendship and alliance between the Republic of Paraguay and the Empire of Brazil remained strong until 1852, when Rosas was finally overthrown. In fact, the Brazilian diplomacy played a key role for the recognition of the Independence of Paraguay. On the other hand, Paraguay gave its full support to Brazil, fighting its own campaign against Buenos Aires. However, in the final phase of the conflict (1851–1852), President Carlos López refused to join forces with the Allied army, keeping a defensive role (as established with Brazil). This was because López was very suspicious of Justo José de Urquiza, former General of Rosas' army who became the leader of the Argentine insurrection. See: Ramos R., Antonio (2016): "La Independencia del Paraguay y el Imperio del Brasil", pp. 763-771. Brasilia: FUNAG. ISBN 978-85-7631-582-7)	Brazil; Uruguay; Paraguay (Argentina) Argentine Rebels	Argentina	Victory: Paraguay occupies the Misiones Province; Juan Manuel de Rosas overthrown by the Allied Forces led by Brazil; Argentine Confederation recognizes the Independence of Paraguay, with Brazilian support; Brazilian hegemony in the Platine region starts	Carlos Antonio López
Paraguayan War (1864–1870)	Paraguay	Brazil; Argentina; Uruguay	Defeat: Allied occupation of Paraguay; Paraguay lost approx. 33% of territory to the Allied Powers; around 50% of the Paraguayan population died during the war; Postwar decade of severe social crisis, political inestability and constant rebellions in 1870 - 1879	Francisco Solano López
Caballero's revolts (1873-1874)	Paraguay Support: Empire of Brazil	Bernardino Caballero and other Lopiztas Support: Argentina	Government Defeat: Rebels topple the Jovellanos cabinet, forcing Benigno Ferreira and others into exile; Brazil imposes Juan Bautista Gill as next president	Salvador Jovellanos
Commander Molas' revolt (1874)	Paraguay; Empire of Brazil	José Dolores Molas; Armed peasants	Government Victory: Brazilian troops force rebels to disperse; Gill's government loses legitimacy due to its failure against the rebels	Juan Bautista Gill
General Serrano's revolt (1874)	Paraguay	German Serrano; Armed peasants	Government Victory: Rebels defeated; General Serrano executed after battle	Juan Bautista Gill
1877 uprising (1877)	Paraguay	Cirilo Antonio Rivarola loyalists	Government Victory: Rebels defeated; President Gill assassinated; Start of General Caballero's hegemony over Paraguayan politics	Juan Bautista Gill, Higinio Uriarte
Juan Silvano Godoi's revolt (1879)	Paraguay	Juan Silvano Godoi and allies Support: Argentine officers	Government Victory: Argentine Navy forces rebels to sail back to Buenos Aires	Candido Bareiro
Liberal uprising (1891)	Colorado Party (Government)	Liberal Party (Rebels)	Government Victory: Rebels defeated; Start of Juan Bautista Egusquiza's political rise	Juan Gualberto González
Liberal Revolution (1904)	Caballerist Colorados (Government)	Liberal Party; Egusquicista Colorados (Rebels)	Government Defeat: Rebels overthrow the Escurra government; Liberal Regime established until 1936; Paraguayan Army disbanded and then rebuilt based on rebel forces	Juan Antonio Escurra
First Paraguayan Civil War (1911–1912)	Radical Liberals (Government)	Civic Liberals; Colorado Party (Rebels)	Government Defeat: Eduardo Schaerer becomes the 25th president of Paraguay	Manuel Gondra, Albino Jara, Liberato Marcial Rojas, Mario Uscher - Alfredo Aponte - Marcos Caballero Codas (triumvirate), Pedro Pablo Peña, Emiliano González Navero
Second Paraguayan Civil War (1922–1923)	Saco Puku Liberals (Government)	Saco Mbyky Liberals (Rebels)	Government Victory: Defeat of the supporters of Eduardo Schaerer, known as the "Saco Mbyky" side; Consolidation of the faction of Manuel Gondra and Eusebio Ayala, known as the "Saco Puku" side	Eusebio Ayala
Chaco War (1932–1935)	Paraguay	Bolivia	Victory: Most of the disputed area awarded to Paraguay.	Eusebio Ayala
World War II (1945) (Note: Paraguay declared war to the Axis Powers on February 7, 1945. Before this, some Paraguayan pilots joined the Brazilian Air Force in 1944 and served in missions for protection of Allied convoys.)	United States; Soviet Union; United Kingdom; China; France; Paraguay and others	Germany; Japan; Italy and others	Victory: Collapse of the German Reich; Fall of Japanese and Italian Empires; Creation of the United Nations; Emergence of the United States and the Soviet Union as superpowers; Beginning of the Cold War	Higinio Morínigo
Third Paraguayan Civil War (1947)	(Paraguay) Moríñigo Government; Colorado Party (Government); Supported by: Argentina; United States	Liberal Party; Revolutionary Febrerista Party; Paraguayan Communist Party (Rebels)	Government Victory: Liberal Party definitely overthrown from power; Colorado Party returns to political power since 1947 - 1948; Colorado Hegemony established until 2008	Higinio Morínigo
Guerrillas against Stroessner (1958–1980)	Paraguay; Supported by: United States (1958-1980)	Paraguayan Revolutionary Guerrillas: * FULNA (Frente Unido de Liberación Nacional) * 14 de Mayo * Columna Mariscal López * Movimiento Gaspar Rodríguez de Francia * OPM (Organización Político Militar) * Ligas Agrarias (disputed)	Government Victory: President Alfredo Stroessner remains in power and suppresses all insurrections; Severe human rights violations caused by Stroessner's regime	Alfredo Stroessner
Dominican Civil War (1965–1966)	Dominican Loyalists; United States; Brazil; Paraguay; Honduras; Nicaragua; Costa Rica; El Salvador	Dominican Constitutionalists	Victory: Juan Bosch excluded from Presidency, election of Joaquín Balaguer	Alfredo Stroessner
Insurgency In Paraguay (2005–present)	Paraguay: Armed forces; Police; Joint Task Force (FTC); Supported by: United States; Colombia Justicieros de la Frontera	Paraguayan People's Army (EPP); Armed Peasant Association (ACA) (Note: ACA was active from 2014 until 2016, when most of its members and leaders were killed. The group was effectively defunct after this point, but was revived sometime in 2017 by members of the EML.); Army of Marshal López (EML) (from 2016); Supported by: FARC (until 2016); Manuel Rodríguez Patriotic Front (alleged); Primeiro Comando da Capital; Comando Vermelho	Ongoing low-level conflict	Nicanor Duarte, Fernando Lugo, Federico Franco, Horacio Cartes, Mario Abdo Benítez, Santiago Peña

== See also ==
- Paraguay Expedition (United States Navy expedition to Asunción)
