= Manuel Franco =

Paraguayan politician (1871–1919)

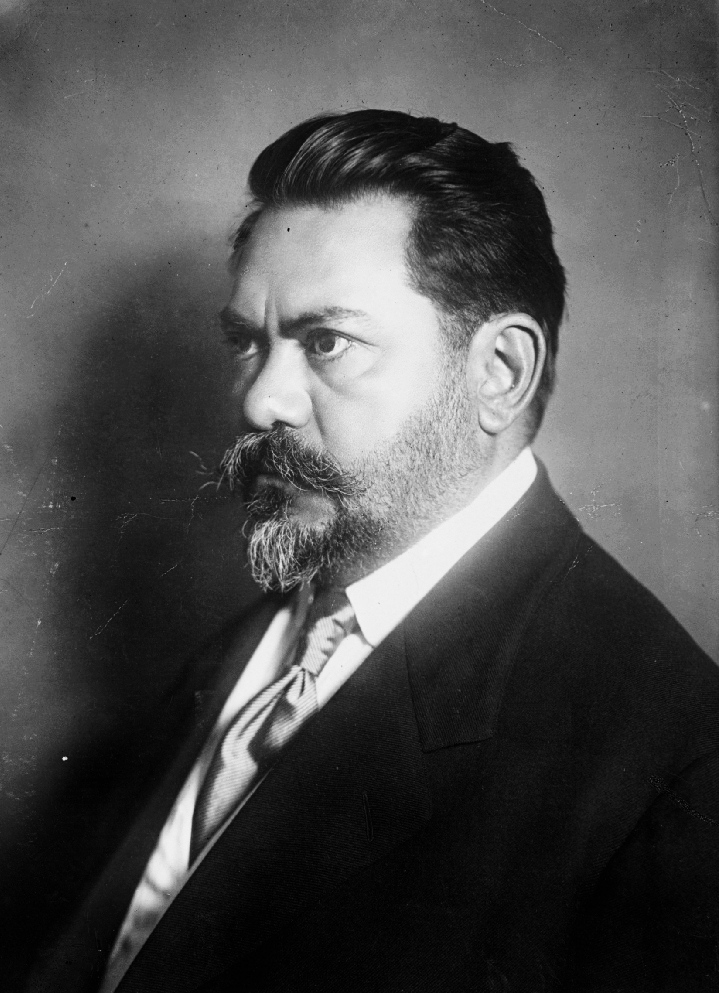
- Portrait, c. 1916–1919

26th President of Paraguay
- In office August 15, 1916 – June 5, 1919
- Vice President: José Pedro Montero
- Preceded by: Eduardo Schaerer
- Succeeded by: José Pedro Montero

Personal details
- Born: July 9, 1871 Concepción, Paraguay
- Died: June 5, 1919 (aged 47) Asunción, Paraguay
- Party: Liberal Party
- Occupation: Lawyer

Manuel Franco (July 9, 1871 – June 5, 1919) was President of Paraguay from August 15, 1916, to June 5, 1919.

== Childhood and Youth ==
Doctor Manuel Franco was born in Concepción on June 9, 1871, in times of the government of Cirilo Antonio Rivarola. Manuel was son of Josefa Antonio Franco and was baptized in the Church of Concepción by Father Evaristo Serrano.

He never married but during his life fathered four children: Evaristo, Fernando, María Ana and Manuel Franco Jr.

After concluding his elementary studies, the young Manuel, accompanied by his aunt Trifona Franco de Isnardi, traveled to Asunción to continue his studies. He got in the National School as a boarder.

He moved to the Capital in 1891. He was fellow student of Adolfo Riquelme and Eugenio A. Garay. He went to Law School where he got a PhD.

== Career ==
His limited resources forced him, during his university studies, to accept bureaucratic positions.

In 1893 he was appointed 1st official of the General Accounting Secretary of the Nation and in 1894 Book-keeper of the same institution.

In spite of his liberal position about politics, he pursued a career in the public administration.

In August 1899, he integrated the National Council of Education, along with Manuel Domínguez. President Escurra appointed him, in June 1903, Director of the Colegio Nacional de la Capital, position he occupied until his replacement in 1907 by Cleto Romero.

In May 1905, he became part of the commission in charge of investigate the regimen of Colorado (a political party) government after it was overthrown. Other members of this commission were Gerónimo Zubizarreta and Francisco Rolón.

During the government of Emiliano González Navero, Manuel was appointed Minister of Justice and in 1908, Minister of the Interior.

Months later he became Director of the Agricultural Bank and in 1910 he obtained the tenure of the Supreme Court of Justice, along with Francisco C. Chávez and Manuel Burgos.

In 1912 he was Senator of the nation. In 1913, he became Director of Public Prosecutions Ad Hoc and in 1916 he returned to his place at the Senate.

His activity in politics was result of his constant interactions with renowned people in the intellectual world. He was part of a radical group of Liberalismo (a political party) and had Manuel Gondra as his mentor.

In 1911, along with Gondra, Schaerer, Montero and Emiliano González Navero, was part of the Revolutionary Board in Pilar, Ñeembucú.

After the Great War was over, in the circumstances of total ruin, new factors started to operate, some of them good for the continuity and expansion of culture and education. According to Josefina Plá two factors contributed: the return of a minority of educated Paraguayans that were abroad and that would form the leading class, and immigration, with people that came to the country and participated actively in the civic reconstruction of the country.

== Teaching career ==
He was always preoccupied about the flaws in the education system. As a teacher, he dedicated himself to utilize his knowledge to apply them for teaching.

He was professor of Civic Law and Morals in the Colegio Nacional de la Capital and Law School of the Asunción's National University, where he also taught Civil Law. He was also Rector of the university in 1912.

== Government ==
He assumed the Presidency of Paraguay on August 15, 1916 – until June 5, 1919. He was candidate for the Liberal Party and received the position from Eduardo Scharer. The vice-president that accompanied him was José P. Montero.

Paraguay acquired diplomatic prestige thanks to the designation of the people he made representatives of the country. They were: Manuel Gondra in the United States and Mexico, Fulgencio R. Moreno in Bolivia and Cecilio Báez in Europe.

He traced objectives in his government, giving priority to the professional education, the land reform, the implementation of the secret vote and the fixing of the currency value.

He didn't neglect the subject of education; favoring the educational plan of 1904 and years later the statute that ruled the teacher's payment.

During his presidency, an Act was introduced in June 1917 that made Sunday rest mandatory.

He paid attention to Asunción's appearance and transformed the big market into a public square.

He formed a first class ministerial cabinet, selecting the most noticeable of intelligence in Paraguayan politics: Luis A. Riart, Manuel Gondra, Félix Paiva, Eligio Ayala and Ernesto Velázquez. He acted with impartiality and named Republicans too for public positions.

His government stood out for its capacity and honesty.

== Death ==
Manuel died of a heart attack, in office on June 5, 1919, and the Vice-president José P. Montero assumed the Presidency.

The old street Del Sol (later called Espinoza and after Villarrica) of Asunción receive the name of Presidente Franco (President Franco). That's also the name of one of the most important arteries in Concepción; it goes from the port to the Avenue Pinedo.

Political offices
Preceded by Eduardo Schaerer	President of Paraguay; 1916-1919	Succeeded by José Pedro Montero
