= Minister of Foreign Affairs (Paraguay) =

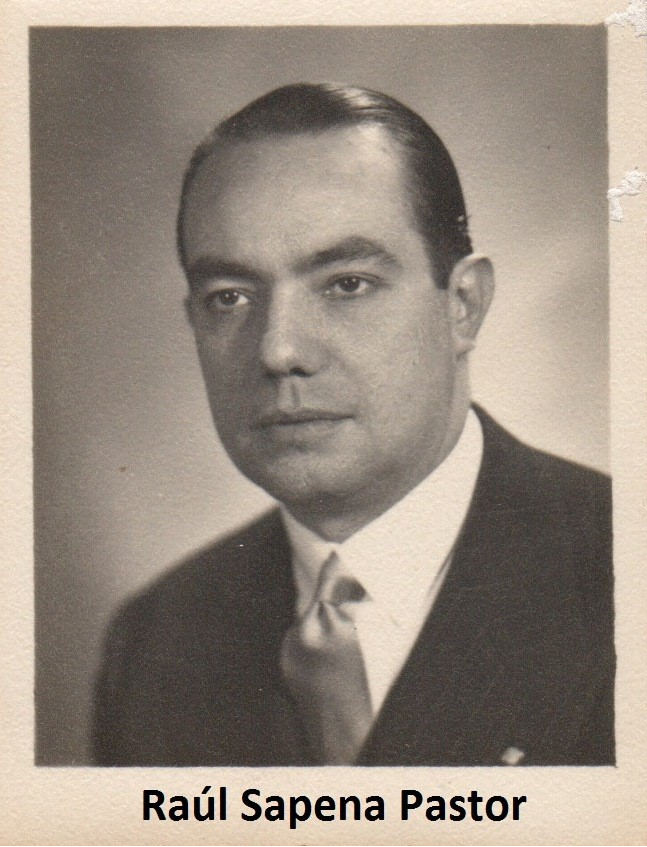
Raúl Sapena Pastor, longest-serving Minister of Foreign Affairs of Paraguay (1956–1976).

This is a list of foreign ministers of Paraguay from 1846 to the present day.

- 1846–1855: José Falcón
- 1855–1862: Nicolás Vázquez
- 1862: Domingo Francisco Sánchez
- 1862–1868: José Berges
- 1868: Gumersindo Benítez (acting)
- 1868–1869: Luis Caminos
- 1869–1870: Serapio Machaín (acting)
- 1870: Bernardo Recalde (acting)
- 1870–1871: Miguel Palacios
- 1871: Carlos Loizaga
- 1871: José Segundo Decoud
- 1871–1872: José Falcón
- 1872–1873: Gregorio Benítez Inchausti
- 1873–1874: José del Rosario Miranda (acting)
- 1874: Cándido Bareiro
- 1874: Higinio Uriarte
- 1874–1877: Facundo Machaín
- 1877: Benjamín Aceval
- 1877–1878: Juan Antonio Jara
- 1878–1880: Benjamín Aceval
- 1880–1886: José Segundo Decoud
- 1886–1887: Benjamín Aceval
- 1887: Agustín Cañete (acting)
- 1887–1888: José Segundo Decoud
- 1888–1890: Juan Crisóstomo Centurión
- 1890–1894: Venancio Víctor López
- 1894–1895: Héctor Velázquez
- 1895–1900: José Segundo Decoud
- 1900–1901: Fabio Queirolo
- 1901–1902: Juan Cancio Flecha
- 1902: Manuel Domínguez
- 1902–1903: Pedro Pablo Peña
- 1903: Cayetano Carreras
- 1903–1904: Antolín Irala
- 1904–1905: Gualberto Cardús Huerta
- 1905: Cecilio Báez
- 1905–1906: Cayetano Carreras (acting)
- 1906: Adolfo Rufo Soler
- 1906–1908: Cecilio Báez
- 1908: Eusebio Ayala
- 1908–1910: Manuel Gondra
- 1910–1911: Héctor Velázquez
- 1911: Cecilio Báez
- 1911: Teodosio González
- 1911: Carlos Luis Isasi
- 1911–1912: Antolín Irala
- 1912: Fulgencio Ricardo Moreno
- 1912: Félix Paiva
- 1912: Eusebio Ayala
- 1912–1913: Félix Paiva
- 1913–1918: Manuel Gondra
- 1918–1919: Eusebio Ayala
- 1919–1920: Ramón Lara Castro
- 1920–1921: Manuel Peña Rojas
- 1921–1923: Alejandro Arce
- 1923–1924: Rogelio Ibarra Muñoz
- 1924–1925: Manuel Peña Rojas
- 1925–1928: Enrique Bordenave
- 1928–1931: Gerónimo Zubizarreta
- 1931–1932: Raúl Casal Ribeiro
- 1932: Higinio Arbo
- 1932–1934: Justo Pastor Benítez
- 1935–1936: Luis Alberto Riart
- 1936–1937: Juan Stefanich
- 1937–1938: Cecilio Báez
- 1938–1939: Elías Ayala
- 1939–1940: Justo Pastor Prieto Rojas
- 1940: Justo Pastor Benítez
- 1940: Tomás Andrés Salomoni
- 1940–1944: Luis Andrés Argaña
- 1944–1946: Horacio Chiriani Cotor
- 1946: Antonio Alberto Taboada
- 1946–1947: Miguel Ángel Soler
- 1947: Federico Chaves
- 1947–1948: César Augusto Vasconsellos
- 1948: Domingo Montanaro
- 1948–1949: Juan Emiliano O'Leary (acting)
- 1949: Federico Chaves
- 1949–1952: Bernardo Ocampos
- 1952–1953: Ángel Florentín Peña (acting to 1953)
- 1953–1954: José Antonio Moreno González
- 1954–1956: Hipólito Sánchez Quell
- 1956–1976: Raúl Sapena Pastor
- 1975–1983: Alberto Nogués (acting for Sapena to 1976)
- 1983–1988: Carlos Augusto Saldívar
- 1988–1989: Rodney Elpidio Acevedo
- 1989–1990: Luis María Argaña
- 1990–1993: Alexis Frutos Vaesken
- 1993: Diógenes Martínez
- 1993–1996: Luis María Ramírez Boettner
- 1996–1998: Rubén Melgarejo Lanzoni
- 1998–1999: Dido Florentín Bogado
- 1999: Miguel Abdón Saguier
- 1999–2000: José Félix Fernández Estigarribia
- 2000–2001: Juan Esteban Aguirre Martínez
- 2001–2003: José Antonio Moreno Ruffinelli
- 2003–2006: Leila Rachid de Cowles
- 2006–2008: Rubén Ramírez Lezcano
- 2008–2009: Alejandro Hamed
- 2009–2011: Héctor Lacognata
- 2011–2012: Jorge Lara Castro
- 2012–2013: José Félix Fernández Estigarribia
- 2013–2018: Eladio Loizaga
- 2018–2019: Luis Castiglioni
- 2019–2020: Antonio Rivas Palacios
- 2020–2021: Federico González Franco
- 2021–2022: Euclides Acevedo
- 2022–2023: Julio Arriola
- 2023–present: Rubén Ramírez Lezcano

== See also ==
- Ministry of Foreign Affairs (Paraguay)

== Sources ==
- Rulers.org – Foreign ministers L–R
