= Paraguayan Civil War =

The Paraguayan Civil War may refer to three conflicts:

- Paraguayan Civil War (1911–1912)
- Paraguayan Civil War (1922–1923)
- Paraguayan Civil War (1947)

== See also ==
- Insurgency in Paraguay
