= Presidente Franco =

Presidente Franco may refer to:

- Manuel Franco, 26th President of Paraguay
- Rafael Franco, 32nd President of Paraguay
- Federico Franco, 49th President of Paraguay
- Presidente Franco District, district and city of the Alto Paraná Department, Paraguay
