= Juan Antonio Escurra =

President of Paraguay from 1902 to 1904

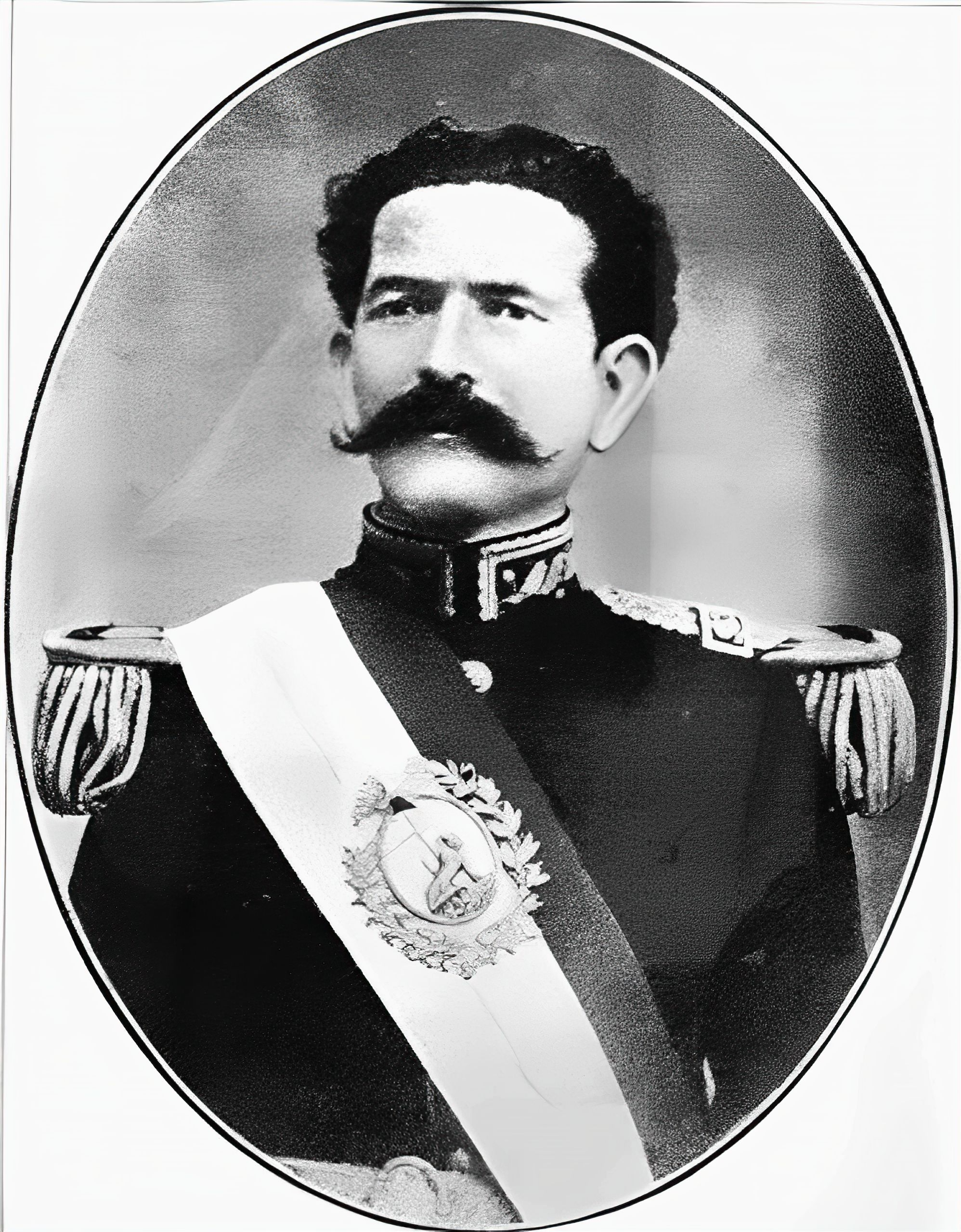
- Official portrait, c. 1902

16th President of Paraguay
- In office November 25, 1902 – December 19, 1904
- Vice President: Manuel Domínguez
- Preceded by: Héctor Carvallo
- Succeeded by: Juan Gaona

Personal details
- Born: May 6, 1859 Caraguatay, Paraguay
- Died: August 24, 1929 (aged 70) Villa Hayes, Paraguay
- Party: Colorado

Juan Antonio Escurra (May 6, 1859 – August 24, 1929) was the President of Paraguay from 1902 to 1904. He was defeated in the 1904 Revolution.

== Beginnings ==
He was born on May 6, 1859, in Caraguatay, Cordillera department. He went to school in his hometown, and later dedicated to farming. In 1879, at the age of 20 he joined the army. He got important promotions. In 1891 he was designated Commander in Misiones; in May 1892 he was promoted to Lieutenant Colonel and on August 24, 1897, to Colonel of the nation. His most important promotion was to Second Lieutenant of Cavalry. He was part of the coup that overthrew the government of Emilio Aceval. He had an important participation in the riot on October 18, 1891, in which he defended the government of General Egusquiza.

Between 1898 and 1902 he was Minister of War and Navy, during the government of Emilio Aceval and Héctor Carvallo. He was member of the Colorado Party.

== His government ==
He was president of Paraguay at the age of 43, between November 25, 1902, and December 19, 1904. He could complete his period of government because the revolution in 1904. The vice-president was Manuel Dominguez, who also adhered to the revolution. The cabinet of Escurra was the youngest ever, because the member where only from 26 to 43 years old. They were: Fulgencio R. Moreno, Juan Bautista Gaona and Emiliano González Navero in Treasury; Eduardo Fleitas and José Emilio Pérez in the Department of the Interior; Cayetano Carreras in the Justice and Culture Department; Antonio Cáceres, Patricio Escobar, Bernardino Caballero and Benigno Ferreira in War and Navy; Pedro Pablo Peña, Cayetano Carreras, Gualberto Cardús Huerta and Cecilio Báez in the Foreign Office.

During his government the prestigious school San José was founded, the national currency and budget stabilized. The currency had a respectable value during his government. The commerce grew noticeably, the firm Casal Ribeiro exported successfully tobacco and cotton to Europe; Rius y Jorba exported leather and wool in great amounts. Arturo Rebaudi, according to decree of March 21, 1904, was as delegate to the 2nd Medical Congress, in Buenos Aires; the first class of Medicine from the National University graduated; San Antonio was declared a district, the Solar Artigas was donated to Uruguay, the construction of a monument to the Heroes of Ytororó was authorized and the Argentine Code of Commerce was adopted.

On December 29, 1903, Cecilio Báez was designated plenipotentiary in Mexico and the United States. Juan O'Leary was inspector of the National Lottery. In 1902 Silvano Mosqueira quit to his position in the Municipality's secretary and was replaced by Federico Chávez. In 1903 Tomás Matto left his position in the Police Headquarters, the Economic and Administrative Board of Mbuyapey was created, having Ceferino Ayala as president and Carlos Pastore as vice-president. Fernando Vera was appointed calligraphic of the National Library in replacement of Alberto Correa and the government donated to Uruguay the “Solar Artigas”.

Among the events that are worth mentioning in education is the organization of the First National Congress of Teachers in February 1903 and the adoption of the “Franco Plan” in the National School on March 25, 1904. That same year the poet Narciso R. Colmán was appointed magistrate in the locality of Caballero. In 1903 graduated from the Faculty of Medicine: Andrés Barbero, Ricardo Odriozola, Manuel Urbieta and Eusebio Taboada, among others.

In August 1904 there was an agitated military movement that settled in Villeta and in October exploded as a revolution that ended in the overthrowing of Escurra's government, the 1904 Revolution, caused in part by bad economic performance during his term. With it, came the end of the republican government and the start of the Liberal era. After his destitution, Escurra retired from the politics, going back to a simple life away from the public scenery. He moved to Villa Hayes, where he formed a family.

== A goodbye with honors ==
Colonel Escurra died in Villa Hayes on August 24, 1929. The Executive Power, by decree, disposed that he would be honored. A wake was held in the “Palacio de López” and his body was buried in the Recoleta Cemetery. When the car that transported the mortal rests of Escurra arrived to the port of Asunción, there were paid the official military honors. Many participated of his funeral: Eligio Ayala, President José P. Guggiari, members of the Supreme Court and the Parliament, several fellow party members and high class families. There was a solemn mass in the Metropolitan Cathedral given by the Archbishop of Asunción, Juan Sinforiano Bogarín.

== Personal life ==
He was married with Josefa M. Rojas, a woman from a traditional family, who later would be the First Lady of the nation. His family worked growing cotton, corn and fruits. After Uriarte and Egusquiza, he was the third president with a Basque last name.

Political offices
Preceded by Andrés Héctor Carvallo	President of Paraguay; 1902–1904	Succeeded by Juan Bautista Gaona
