= Andrés Barbero =

Paraguayan botanist (1877-1951)

- Born: Andrés José Camilo Barbero Crosa; July 28, 1877; Asunción, Paraguay
- Died: February 14, 1951 (aged 73) Asunción, Paraguay
- Occupation: Medicine Natural history

Andrés José Camilo Barbero (28 July 1877 – 14 February 1951) was a Paraguayan scientist and botanist. He was a key figure in the founding of many Paraguayan scientific and medical institutions.

== Early life and education ==
Andrés Barbero was born in Asunción in 1877, the third of five children of Juan Barbero and Carolina Crosa, immigrants from Piedmont who had reached Paraguay in the aftermath of the Paraguayan War. Juan Barbero made a significant fortune from the period of reconstruction after the war, becoming a landowner of urban and rural ranches. In 1910, he acquired an expensive property on España Avenue, which extended as far as the railroad, to present day Gondra Street.

Barbero finished his pharmacy studies in 1898, and his medical studies in 1903, among the first people to receive their medical diploma in Paraguay. His family's prosperity allowed him to dedicate himself completely to teaching, beginning with the National School and later in the same Medicine University, in the subjects of physical medicine, physiology and histology.

== Career ==
Along with colleagues Emilio Hassler, Guillermo Tell Bertoni, and the Paraguayan Teodoro Rojas, Barbero was one of the founders of the Paraguayan Scientific Society. His botanical research led him to work at the Natural History Museum, and he later became the editor of Paraguay's Scientific Magazine.

He was a key financial backer of several organizations he helped to establish, including the Red Cross (whose hospital was inaugurated in 1937), the Cancer Institute, the Scientific Society, a children’s hospital, and an ophthalmology center. He also financed the construction of a three-story building at the corner of España Avenue and Mompox, which housed many of his scientific institutions, with support from the Barbero Foundation. The Natural Science Museum was also installed there, now known as the Andrés Barbero Museum and Library.

He was briefly the acting Treasury Minister during Félix Paiva's government in 1938.

From the 1940s onwards, he helped to found other institutions including Paraguay's Ethnographic Society, Indian Society, the Paraguayan Institute of Historical Investigation, the Paraguayan Academy of History, and the Guaraní Culture Society.

In 1941, he was awarded the National Order of Merit, with the rank of Grand Officer.

== Death and legacy ==
Barbero died in Asunción on 14 February 1951, unmarried with no children. The Paraguayan Government decreed the day of his death as a day of national mourning.

Barbero's sisters donated all his belongings to the La Piedad Foundation, which was founded in his honor.

In Asunción, there is a monument to Dr. Barbero in Artigas Avenue and Brasil Street.
