= Juan Bautista Gaona =

Paraguayan politician (1845–1932)

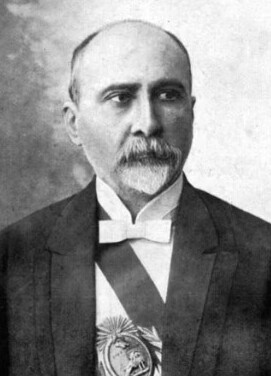
- Portrait, 1904

12th Vice President of Paraguay
- In office 25 November 1910 – 17 January 1911
- President: Manuel Gondra
- Preceded by: Emiliano González Navero
- Succeeded by: Pedro Bobadilla (1912)

17th President of Paraguay
- In office 18 October 1904 – 8 December 1905
- Vice President: Vacant
- Preceded by: Juan Antonio Escurra
- Succeeded by: Cecilio Báez

Personal details
- Born: Juan Bautista Gaona Figueredo; 30 June 1845 Asunción, Paraguay
- Died: 18 May 1932 (aged 86) Asunción, Paraguay
- Party: Liberal Party
- Spouse: Regina Corti Onetto
- Children: 12

Juan Bautista Gaona Figueredo (30 June 1845 – 18 May 1932) was a Paraguayan politician who was provisional President of Paraguay October 18, 1904 – December 8, 1905 and Vice President from 1910 to 1911. He was Minister of Finance of Paraguay in December 1904. He was a member of the Liberal Party.

He became president in virtue of the 1904 Revolution; his presidency was when the period of dominance for the Liberal Party in Paraguayan politics, which lasted for more than 30 years, began.

His presidency ended when he was overthrown in a 1905 non-violent military coup. He was subsequently replaced by finance minister Cecilio Báez.

Political offices
Preceded by Juan Antonio Escurra	President of Paraguay; 1904–1905	Succeeded by Cecilio Báez
Preceded by Emiliano González Navero	Vice President of Paraguay; 1910–1911	Succeeded by Pedro Bobadilla
