= José Pedro Montero =

President of Paraguay

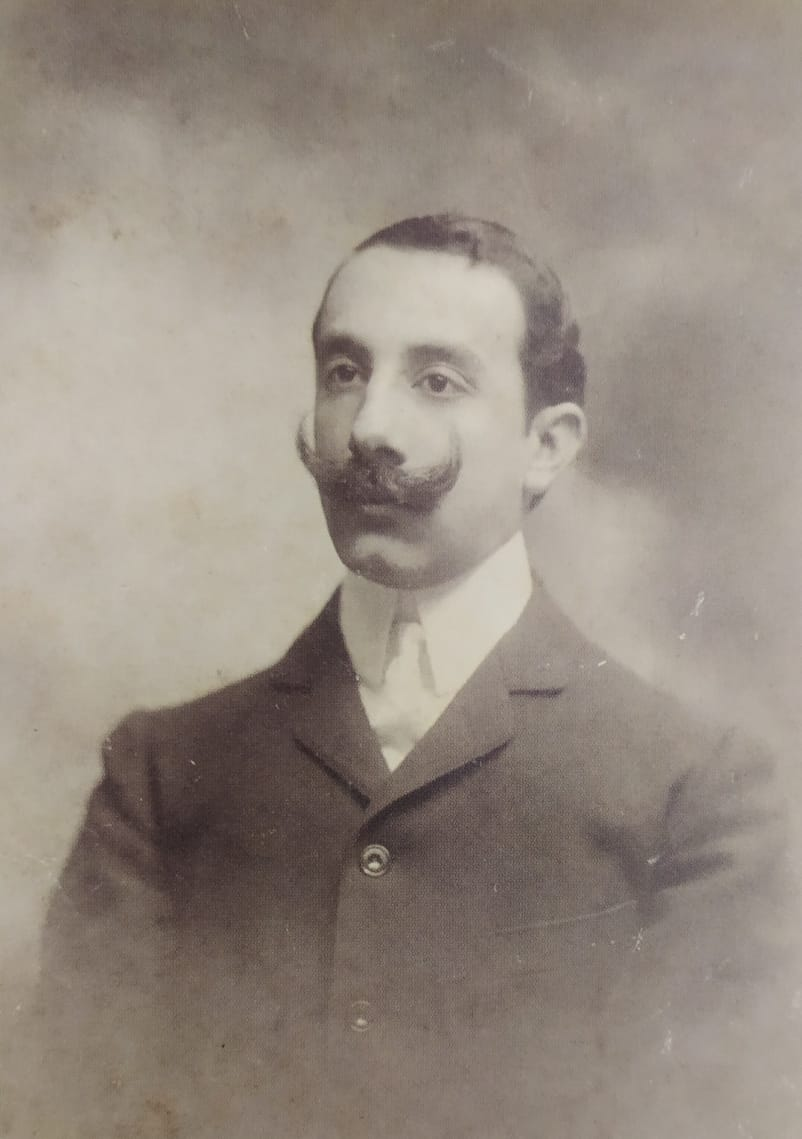
- Portrait, 1904

27th President of Paraguay
- In office 6 June 1919 – 15 August 1920
- Vice President: Office Vacant
- Preceded by: Manuel Franco
- Succeeded by: Manuel Gondra

14th Vice President of Paraguay
- In office 15 August 1916 – 5 June 1919
- President: Manuel Franco
- Preceded by: Pedro Bobadilla
- Succeeded by: Félix Paiva (1920)

Personal details
- Born: 1 August 1878 Asunción, Paraguay
- Died: 7 June 1927 (aged 48) Asunción, Paraguay
- Spouse: Andrea Campos Cervera

José Pedro Montero (1 August 1878 – 7 June 1927) was President of Paraguay from 1919 to 1920.

== Early life ==
José Pedro Montero Candia was born in Asunción, at the home of Spanish and Italian immigrants in a neighborhood called Villa Aurelia, southeast of the Recoleta, on 1 August 1878. He married Andrea Campos Cervera, and studied in the Colegio Nacional de la Capital (Capital's National School) with his friend Pastor Ibáñez.

He finished school in 1896, then moved to Buenos Aires, Argentina, where he studied medicine and became a paediatrician. He graduated in 1904 from the Faculty of Medicine of the UBA University of Buenos Aires, that same year he presented a thesis about "The proof of the chloride".

== Medical career ==
Back in Paraguay, he became director of the Hospital de Clínicas, and a substitute professor of Pediatrics. In 1901, he was appointed Paraguay's delegate in the Pan-American Congress in Buenos Aires. In 1906, he served as Paraguay's delegate to the fourth Medical Congress in Montevideo, Uruguay. From 1905 to 1908 he received a scholarship from the Faculty of Medicine and taught at the same institution. After the events of July 2, 1908, he became active in politics. He later became a member of the Educational Superior Council and Director of Public Assistance. He founded the maternity services, drugstore, chemical, bacteriological, and urgency services. In 1910, he obtained a position as a member of the Parliament, but after Manuel Gondra was overthrown he left the country.

In Argentina he was an active member of a movement organized by the Partido Liberal Radical (Radical Liberal Party) in 1912. Later in the same year, he was part of the Revolutionary Committee of Pilar. He died on 7 June 1927 and by municipal disposition No. 1766 from June 23 of the same year, the old avenue of the hospital was named after him.

== Political career ==
He was Minister of Finance of Paraguay from 1915 to 1916.

He assumed the first magistracy, in his character of Vice President, after the death of Manuel Franco, a position that he held from June 6, 1919 until August 1920. After World War I, the government of Montero was affected the economical crisis that had expanded through the entire region. This crisis affected mostly the middle and lower classes.

His cabinet was composed of Eusebio Ayala in Foreign Relations, Luis Alberto Riart in the Department of the Interior, Manuel Peña in the Treasury Department, Félix Paiva in the Justice and Culture Department, and Commander Adolfo Chirife in War and Navy.

During his government some forts were founded in Chaco, the Caballero State was acquired, the municipal constitutional law was modified, the colony Nueva Colombia was founded, the project for postal charges to United States was approved, Paraguay was invited to participate in the International Rural Congress of Peoria (Illinois, USA). The Ministry of Public Works started to promote the acquisitions of small properties in the entire territory of the country.

It was also made the division of pieces of land and the colonization of the fiscal lands, there were processed more than five thousand files related to buying of farming lands and were drawn up more 154 titles of property. In 1919 more than 100.000 pesos were used for building schools in the interior of the country, the agreement about the arbitrage with Uruguay and Eladio Velázquez was appointed member of the Supreme Court.

In April 1920 the Feminist Center of Paraguay was founded, several schools were also created and the Fortin Dorado in Chaco is settled. On August 15 of the same year, Montero passed the Presidency to Manuel Gondra. Also that year, the commercial agreement with Japan was signed, the law of trial and dismissal of magistrates; sanitary zones in Asunción, Villarica and Caacupé and was created the regulations for the Army.

Some designations were made in the intellectual and artistic field. The people who received this honor were: Narciso R. Colmán, Juan F. Bazán, Arturo Alsina, Juan Sorazábal, Rufo Galeano, José Concepción Ortiz and Eudoro Acosta Flores. Here is important to mention the hiring of the Brazilian Doctor Edgar Roquette Pinto and the retiring of Juan E. O'Leary in the Colegio Nacional and the Escuela Normal.

One of the biggest concerns of Montero was the problem with the land. In 1919 were founded Nueva Colombia, in Altos, with 6,122 hectares and Santiago, in General Delgado, with 1909 hectares. In 1920, Curupaity was founded in Barrero Grande, with a total of 1,111 hectares.

The education suffered some inconveniences and on 25 July 1919 a plan for the educational reform in the schools of the capital and Villarrica was started, a process which lasted four years. On 22 September of the same year the plan was also adopted for high school education.

He was Representative for the capital and was in that position until 1901. On August 7, 1908 he signed the manifest of the "Radicals" assembly. He was Secretary of the Ministry of the Interior during the government of Eduardo Schaerer. He occupied the position until he joined Manuel Franco as companion for the upcoming presidential elections for the period 1916–1920.

Political offices
Preceded by Pedro Bobadilla	Vice President of Paraguay; 1916-1919	Succeeded by Félix Paiva
Preceded by Manuel Franco	President of Paraguay; 1919-1920	Succeeded by Manuel Gondra
