= Pedro Bobadilla =

Paraguayan politician

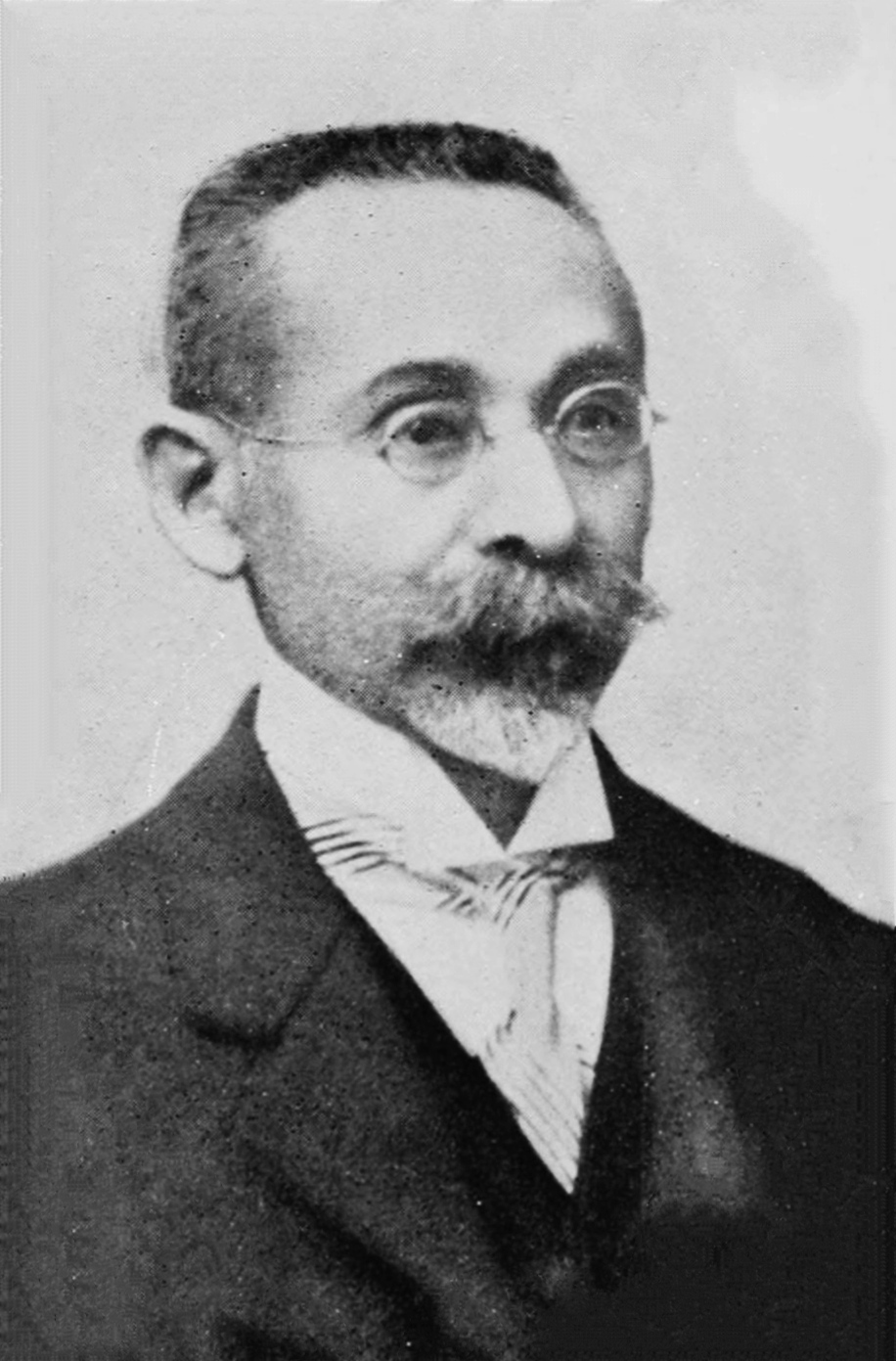
Pedro Bobadilla

Pedro Bobadilla Escobar (25 April 1865, Villeta – 21 April 1942) was Vice President of Paraguay under Eduardo Schaerer from 1912 to 1916. He had previously been Minister of Worship, Justice, and Public Education as well as being a Superior Court Judge. He had initially been educated in the Church at a seminary and was born in Villeta.

Preceded by Juan Bautista Gaona	Vice President of Paraguay; 1912-1916	Succeeded by José Pedro Montero
