= Cecilio Báez =

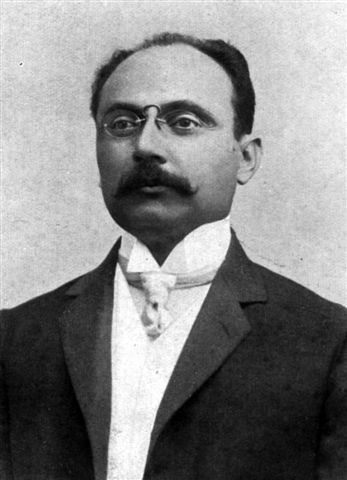
- Portrait, c. 1905

18th President of Paraguay
- In office December 8, 1905 – November 25, 1906
- Preceded by: Juan Bautista Gaona
- Succeeded by: Benigno Ferreira

Personal details
- Born: January 1, 1862 Asunción, Paraguay
- Died: June 18, 1941 (aged 79) Asunción, Paraguay
- Party: Liberal
- Spouse: Marcelina Allende

Cecilio Báez González (January 1, 1862 – June 18, 1941) was provisional President of Paraguay from December 8, 1905 to November 25, 1906. He was a member of the Liberal Party.

== Early life and career ==
Dr. Cecilio Báez González was born in Asunción, capital of Paraguay on February 1, 1862. His parents were Nicholas Báez and Faustina González. His brothers were Otoniel, Benjamin, Modesta and Restituta Báez González.

He was married for 25 years to Marcelina Allende of Caazapa, daughter of Polycarpo Allende and Rosario Monges. They had 14 children, including Amadeo Báez Allende, Arminda Báez Allende, and Nicolas Báez Allende.

He studied at National College of the Capital in 1878. After a year, he served as an intern at Santa Rosa for the monthly sum of 25 patacones.

He was in the first class in which the National University of Asuncion issued the first three diplomas of doctors in Law and Social Sciences on July 15, 1893. The diplomas were handed out in the following order: Cecilio Báez González, Gaspar Villamayor and Emeterio González.

He had a love of writing, which he expressed as a journalist and writer and was also dedicated to teaching and politics.

He served as dean of law, gave lectures in history, and was dean of the National University.

During the government of José Félix Estigarribia, he was appointed Honorary Perpetual Dean of the Universidad Nacional. During his long career, he received several international honors, including membership in the Society of Social Sciences of Philadelphia in the United States, the Academia de Historia Havana and Société Académique de l'Histoire International Paris.

His written works included essays on civil liberties, autocracy in Paraguay, José Gaspar Rodríguez de Francia and dictatorship in South America, and a survey history of Paraguay.

He wrote several legal and historical works. He was known as Master of the Paraguayan Youth. He created one of the most comprehensive libraries of Paraguay. He died in Asuncion on June 18, 1941, at the age of 79 years.

== Political career ==
He was interim President of the Republic, elected by the Assembly on December 9, 1905 to replace Juan Bautista Gaona who was deposed. His cabinet was composed as follows: as Minister of Interior was Jose Emilio Perez, as Finance Minister Emiliano González Navero; in Foreign Affairs, Cayetano A. Carreras and the minister of War and Navy was Benigno Ferreira. This was a period in which political instability did not prevent economic prosperity, as the country grew despite the frequent changes in power.

During his government the first cars were imported to Paraguay; the libraries belonging to Enrique Solano Lopez and Blas Garay, the Military Hospital was built and several streets were paved. In the field of education there were 347 primary schools with 30,000 pupils, while the University had 195 registered and 37 teachers, and the National College with 633 students and 72 teachers. They operated the Faculties of Law, Notaries, Medicine and Pharmacy.

== Political biography ==
He participated in the creation of the Democratic Centre (later Liberal Party) on July 10, 1887, which meant he was exiled in 1891 when members of the party attempted a coup d'etat; he was able to return to Paraguay in 1892. As well as President of the Republic, Báez worked as a lawyer, Senator, President of the Superior Court of Justice and Minister of Foreign Affairs, a professor and, during the government of Félix Paiva, one of the signatories of the Peace Treaty with Bolivia, after the end of the Chaco War.

He served as chancellor for the presidents Juan B. Gaona in 1904, Benigno Ferreira in 1906 and Albino Jara in 1911. In Mexico, he headed a delegation in 1903, and in Great Britain and France in 1919. He attended meetings held in Mexico, Chile and Cuba as a spokesman of international law. In Mexico (1902) he successfully defended the thesis of binding arbitration. He was also the president of the Congress of the International Commission of Jurists in Montevideo in 1914.

Political offices
Preceded by Juan Bautista Gaona	President of Paraguay; 1905–1906	Succeeded by Benigno Ferreira
