= Villa Aurelia =

Coordinates: 25°19′S 57°34′W

- Barrio
- Interactive map of Villa Aurelia
- Country: Paraguay
- Autonomous Capital District: Gran Asunción
- City: Asunción

Villa Aurelia is a neighbourhood (barrio) of Asunción, the capital and largest city of Paraguay.

== Geography ==
The neighborhood Villa Aurelia is located in the city of Asuncion, capital of Paraguay, in the Central Department of the Eastern Region, within the bay of Rio Paraguay, cosmopolitan city where people of different regions of the country and foreigners who live there, already ingrained in her.

== Climate ==
Presents prevailing winds from the north and south, with tropical climate. The average temperature is 28 °C in summer and 19 °C in the winter. The average annual rainfall is 1700 mm.

== Population ==
The total population of the district Villa Aurelia is approximately 10,120 inhabitants, representing a density of 4,650 inhabitants / km ². The male population reaches 49% of the total population, and 51% female.

== Demographics ==
There are a total of 2,205 housing approximately an average of 4.8 people in each household. Predominantly middle-class buildings. The percentage coverage of services is as follows: Some 97% of households have electricity. 65% of homes have running water. 90% of homes have the garbage collection service. The 40% of households used a telephone network. Villa Aurelia does not have any hospital. There are some private medical (dental, gynecological, pediatric). In education has two public schools, private schools, kindergartens and institutions of executive secretarial and typing. The population is mostly middle class, a smaller percentage of high and low class. The residents are employees and middle management workers (carpenters and mechanics).
