= Fulgencio R. Moreno =

Paraguayan journalist, statesman and historian (1872-1933)

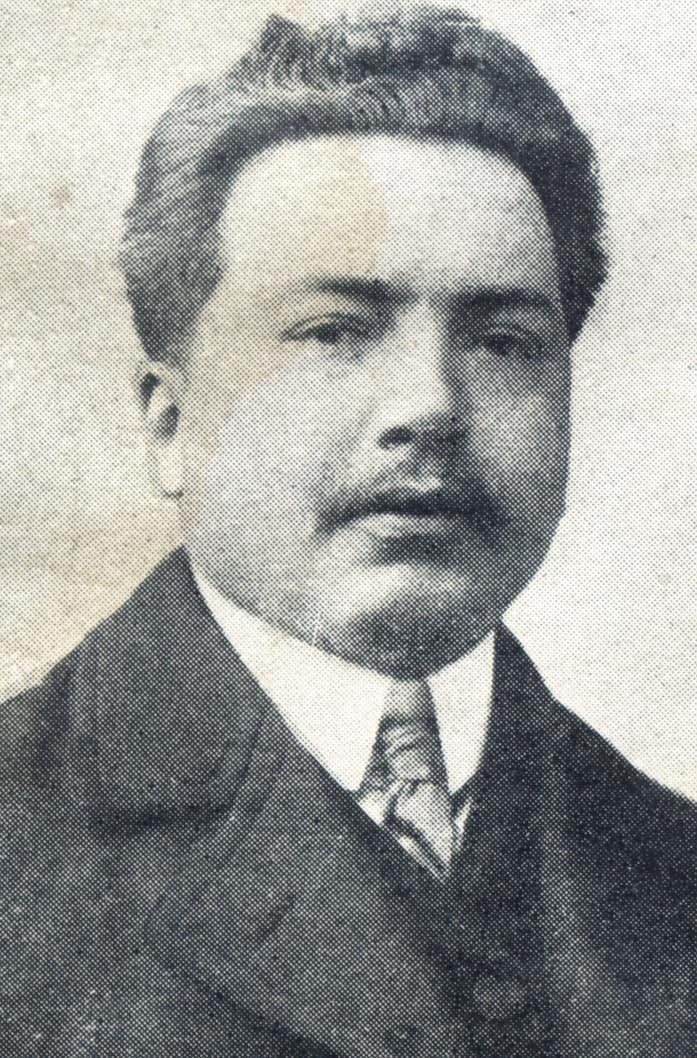
- Born: November 9, 1872; Valle del Tapuá, Central Department, Paraguay
- Died: December 9, 1933 (aged 61); Asunción, Paraguay
- Known for: Journalist, financial expert, researcher
- Notable work: "La Chuchi" "Tomás te canasta"

Fulgencio R. Moreno (November 9, 1872 – December 9, 1933) was a Paraguayan journalist, financial expert, statesman and historian. He was one of the most serious researchers of the Paraguayan history.

== Childhood and youth ==
Moreno was born on November 9, 1872 in Valle del Tapuá (now Limpio), Paraguay. He was descendant of the Yegros (by the side of his mother), a family that had significant importance in Paraguayan history.

He went to high school in the Colegio Nacional de la Capital (National School of the Capital) and started to study Law in the Faculty of Law and Social Sciences, from which he, short time after, dropped out of because he consumed his time participating in political activities since 1900. He was an active member of the Colorado Party.

He married Rosario González Filisbert and fathered many children.

== Public service ==
- Teacher of Paraguayan History in the Escuela Normal de Maestros (School of Teachers) and of Greek History in the Colegio Nacional (National School)
- Director of the Colegio Nacional (National School)
- Director of the Post Office and Telegraphs
- Minister of Finance of Paraguay from 1901 to 1904

He was a historical researcher of authority. In 1910, in times of government of the Liberal Party, the president Manuel Gondra required his services because of a limit problem with Bolivia. He represented the country in the negotiations with Ricardo Mujía (representative from Bolivia). He was diplomatic representative from Paraguay before the governments of Bolivia, Peru and Chile.

== Work ==
Carlos Zubizarreta describes him as a meticulous and sparkling writer. With funny and ironic verses, he knew how to find inspiration in the Native-American traditions. He used the satire very creatively: when he was secretary in the Post Office, he used to ask for salary increases in verses with funny twists, something that he repeated sometimes when he was a diplomatic too.

The poet revealed in his poems the influence of the social and physical environment in which he grew up. He identified with the popular culture and learned the secrets of the city, in his writing is present the collective emotion of the people and the image of the Guaraní land.

Given his knowledge in financial matters, for Moreno, the economy was also present in his writing, he wrote many monographs about it, one of them was "La cuestión monetaria en el Paraguay" (The financial matter in Paraguay), published in 1902. In it, he made an analysis of the productive balance and the consequences of the national currency’s devaluation.

- "Los tratados con Bolivia" (The treaties with Bolivia), 1903
- "Informes sobre Impuestos Internos" (Reports about Internal Taxes), 1906
- "Historia económica del Paraguay" (Economical history of Paraguay), 1911
- "Inmigración y colonización antes y después de la guerra" (Immigration and colonization before and after the war), 1911

In the same year he published a writing of great diffusion: "Estudio sobre la Independencia del Paraguay" (Study about the Paraguayan Independence) with motive of the centenary of the Paraguayan Independence.

- In 1913 he published his essay "El mundo de los átomos" (The world of atoms)
- In 1924 "Los guaraníes en el antiguo Tucumán" (The Guaraní in the old Tucumán)
- In 1926 "La ciudad de Asunción" (The city of Asunción). In this one, he described meticulously the city’s process of formation since the colonial times until the independence.

The same year, he published "Extensión territorial del Paraguay al oeste de su río" (The extension of the Paraguayan territory at the west side of the river).

He was a renowned journalist, permanent writer in "La Prensa" of Buenos Aires.

== Historical labor ==
Moreno ruled out the supposition of how influential was José Gaspar Rodríguez de Francia for the independence of Paraguay. He maintained that: "We can not identify the Paraguayan independence with Francia or attribute him the formation of our nationality because these affirmation, moreover than being contrary to the normal development of countries, are opposite to the documents and historical proves. The way of feeling and thinking of centuries does not change in a day with the effort of just one man."

Raúl Amaral affirms that Moreno’s historical work would have been of great diversity if he would not have been so focused on the problems in Chaco, which consumes great part of his efforts. His work about the Guaraní migration though, exposed in his investigations about the Chaco is of great value.

In the defense of Paraguayan interests in the conflict with Bolivia he pay special interest in the precise knowledge of the history, his obsessive dedication to this subject gave him the nickname of "Doctor de Límites" (Limits Doctor).

Moreno was awarded with several decorations, Paraguayans and Bolivians.

Moreno used to describe himself in a funny way: "I am republican, but I was a revolutionary fighter on October 18; I have several decorations without winning any battles, my name is Moreno (that means a person with dark skin) but I am white, I am sorry my friends, but I am no doctor."

== Last years ==
He died in Asunción on December 9, 1933, at the age of 61.
