= Manuel Burgos =

Paraguayan politician and medical doctor (1871-1947)

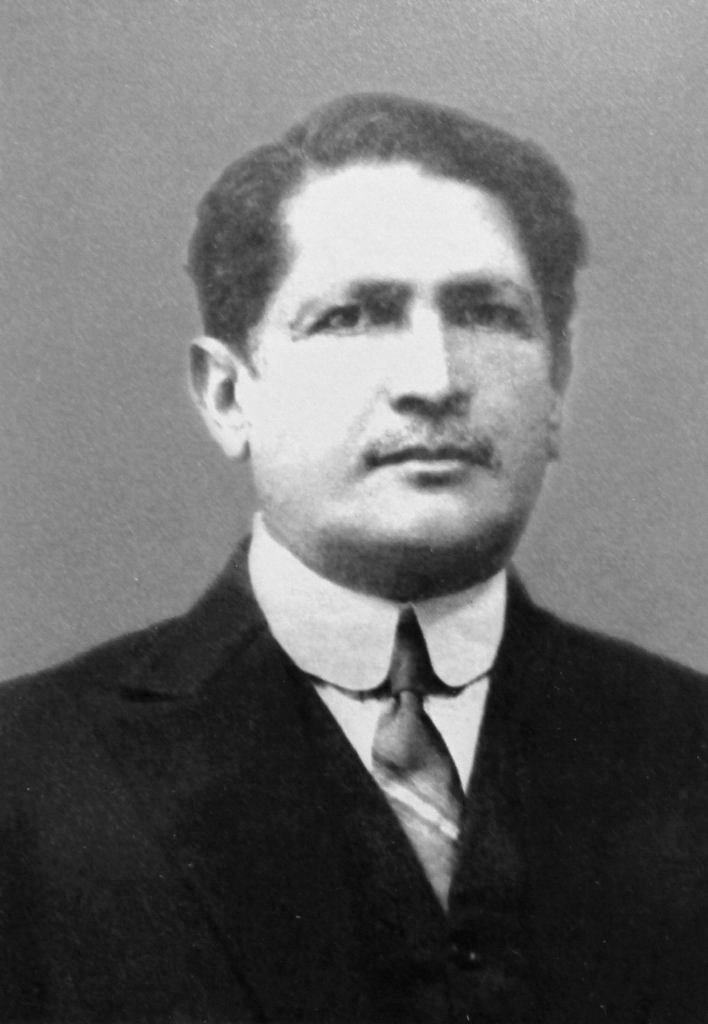
Manuel Burgos

Manuel Burgos (3 December 1871, Luque – 2 July 1947) was a Paraguayan politician and a medical doctor. He served as Vice President of Paraguay from 1924 to 1928.

Preceded by Félix Paiva	Vice President of Paraguay; 1924–1928	Succeeded by Emiliano González Navero
