= Emiliano González Navero =

Paraguayan politician

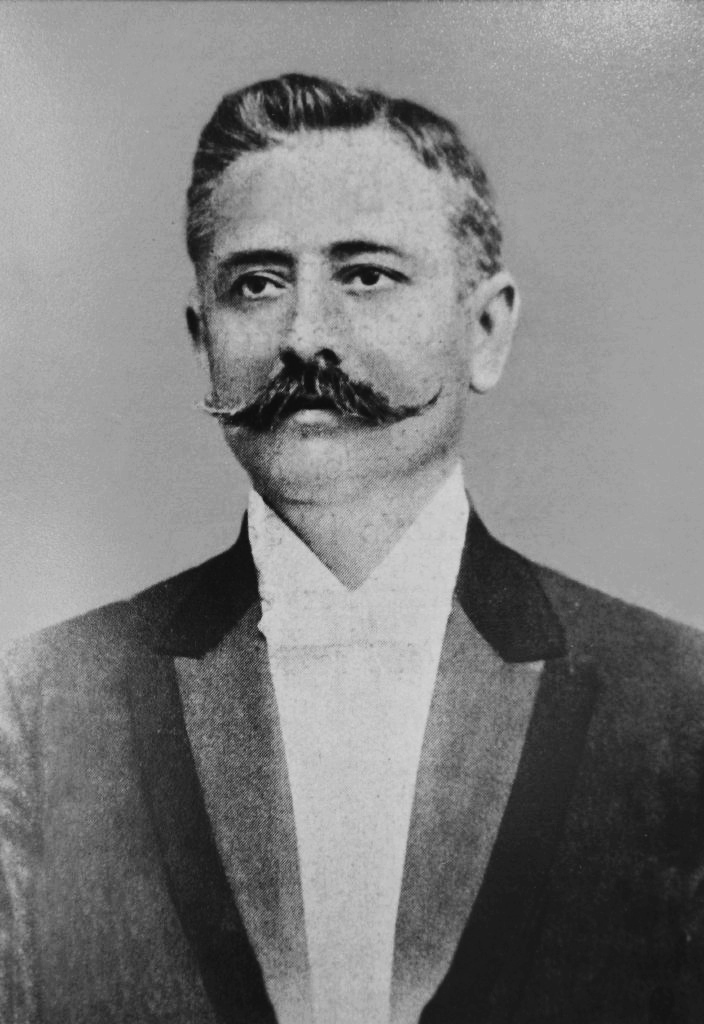
- Portrait, c. 1910

11th Vice President of Paraguay
- In office 27 January 1932 – 15 August 1932
- President: José Patricio Guggiari
- Preceded by: Office Vacant
- Succeeded by: Raúl Casal Ribeiro
- In office 15 August 1928 – 25 October 1931
- President: José Patricio Guggiari
- Preceded by: Manuel Burgos
- Succeeded by: Office Vacant
- In office 25 November 1906 – 4 July 1908
- President: Benigno Ferreira
- Preceded by: Office Vacant
- Succeeded by: Office Vacant

20th President of Paraguay
- In office 25 October 1931 – 27 January 1932
- Vice President: Vacant
- Preceded by: José Patricio Guggiari
- Succeeded by: José Patricio Guggiari
- In office 22 March 1912 – 15 August 1912
- Vice President: Vacant
- Preceded by: Pedro Peña
- Succeeded by: Eduardo Schaerer
- In office 4 July 1908 – 25 November 1910
- Vice President: Vacant
- Preceded by: Benigno Ferreira
- Succeeded by: Manuel Gondra

Personal details
- Born: 16 June 1861 Caraguatay, Paraguay
- Died: 18 October 1934 (aged 73)
- Party: Liberal

Emiliano González Navero (16 June 1861 – 18 October 1934) was a Paraguayan politician of the Liberal Party, he served as President of Paraguay on three occasions and as Vice President of Paraguay on two occasions.

== His life ==
He was one of the survivors of the War against Triple Alliance. He attended elementary school in his hometown and high school at the Colegio Nacional de la Capital.

He was graduated from Law School at the Universidad Nacional de la Capital. Practiced law in 1887 and then acted in the judicial branch as a judge during the government of Juan Antonio Escurra. He was married to Mrs. Adela Lima, who died on 7 September 1928. Emiliano, retired from any public activity, died at home, very far away from his country, in the United States on 18 October 1934.

== His Administration ==
He was three times President of the Republic. Also, he was elected as Vice President of the Republic, holding the same position under the presidencies of Benigno Ferreira from 1906 to 1908 and José Patricio Guggiari from 1928 to 1932.

Upon Ferreira was overthrown by the coup of 2 July 1908, González Navero assumed the temporary presidency on July 5 of that year. After the constitutional period expired, he handed the position over to Manuel Gondra on 25 November 1910. Less than two months later, this President resigned and a period of anarchy started in the country, which led him again to take the temporary presidency on 25 March 1912. A few months later, on 15 August 1912, he handed over command to constitutional president Eduardo Schaerer, which meant the beginning of using such date as the starting date for future presidential terms. During his second term peace was reached in the country, after two long years of civil war.

He later served again as Vice President of José Patricio Guggiari from 1928 to 1932, and in that capacity acted as substitute of president from 26 October 1931 to 28 January 1932 because Guggiari temporarily resigned to undergo impeachment following the unfortunate events of 23 October 1931.

His Administration was formed by the following politicians: Foreign Affairs, Dr. Félix Paiva; Internal Affairs, Eduardo Schaerer, Finance, Dr. Gerónimo Zubizarreta (who later became a prestigious Minister of Foreign Affairs and defender of national sovereignty), Justice, Religion and Public Education, Dr. Manuel Franco, and War and Navy, Manuel Gondra.

== Achievements under his administration ==
Some of the achievements during his administration were: the creation of the Naval School of Mechanics, amnesty for political crimes, enactment of a Rural Code, granting scholarships to many young artists, the free and mandatory elementary school was implemented, development of railway in Concepción and creation of several municipalities in cities throughout the country, on the other hand there were harsh political repression and newspapers were closed down.

Paraguay participated in the International Congress of Art Education, which took place in Dresden, Germany, the sum of $2800 gold seal was allocated to the delegation that attended the Congress of American Students held in Lima, Peru, and J. Inocencio Lezcano and Jose del Rosario Ayala were appointed as teachers in the National Council of Education. They were dissolved The Fire Department and the Security Guard was dissolved and the Naval School of Mechanics founded.

On 1 May 1912, reorganization of the Army was ordered, and the following officials entered as second lieutenants: Emilio Pastore, Alfredo Mena, Carlos J. Fernandez, Blas Miloslavich and Nicolas Delgado. On the same date, Rolando Ibarra entered as captain, and on 11 June of that year he was appointed Assistant to the President.

The Banco Hipotecario was founded; in addition many streets of the capital city were paved and a test of wood cobblestone was made on Palma, Alberdi and 14 de Mayo Streets. For the first time, the cities of Villarrica, Pilar, Encarnación and Concepción appointed their respective mayors; a new central market was built on Palma Street and the Museo de Bellas Artes of Juan Silvano Godoi opened.

The government granted important support to Literature and Arts, the Museo de Bellas Artes was created; a contribution was made to establish an Art School. A scholarship was granted to Andres Campos Cervera (Julian de la Herreria) to study in Canada, also to Eusebio A. Lugo, Guillermo Galindo and Eduardo Molinas Rolón de Arrascaeta. There were auxiliary positions for musicians Agustin Barrios and Ampelio Villalba.

In journalism, "El Nacional" emerged on 1 February 1910, and six magazines and eight newspapers were issued.

== Political career ==
Don Emiliano moved always politically in the "radical" sector of liberalism. He was part of the judicial branch and President of the Supreme Court of Justice on 28 November 1890. In February 1895, he joined the unified Congress, led by Benigno Ferreira. He served in the Liberal Party, being part of the Congress and on 19 December 1904, joined the Administration of Juan Bautista Gaona as Minister of Finance of Paraguay and served in the same function also during the government of Cecilio Báez, resigning on 28 April 1906, in order to join Ferreira in his route to the Presidency.

González Navero was president of the Senate in 1906-1908, 1922, 1924, 1928-1931 and 1932.

After Ferreira was removed, González Navero became head of the Executive Branch on 4 July 1908, although it was only on 31 December 1908 that the resignation of Ferreira was formally accepted. The signature of Don Emiliano does not appear in the Founding Act of the Centro Democratico, neither in the Public Statement of 4 July 1908, initiated by Albino Jara and closed by Adolfo Riquelme.

Political offices
| Preceded by Manuel Domínguez | Vice President of Paraguay; 1906–1908 | Succeeded by Juan Bautista Gaona |
| Preceded by Benigno Ferreira | President of Paraguay; 1908–1910 | Succeeded by Manuel Gondra |
| Preceded by Pedro Peña | President of Paraguay; 1912 | Succeeded by Eduardo Schaerer |
| Preceded by Manuel Burgos | Vice President of Paraguay; 1928–1932 | Succeeded by Raúl Casal Ribeiro |
