= Andrés Héctor Carvallo =

Paraguayan politician (1862-1934)

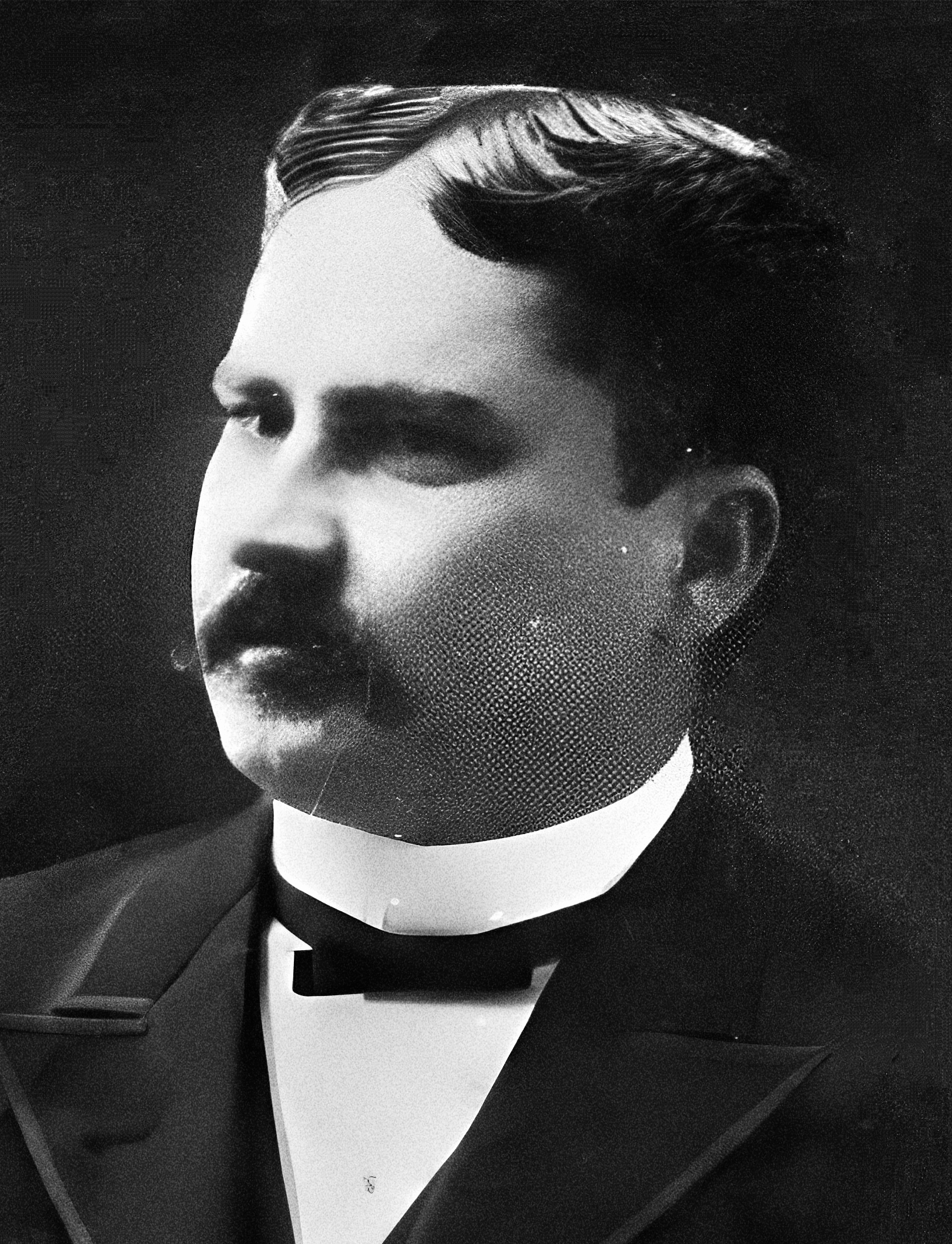
- Carvallo in 1902

15th President of Paraguay
- In office 9 January 1902 – 25 November 1902
- Vice President: Vacant
- Preceded by: Emilio Aceval
- Succeeded by: Juan Antonio Escurra

9th Vice President of Paraguay
- In office 25 November 1898 – 9 January 1902
- President: Emilio Aceval
- Preceded by: Facundo Ynsfrán
- Succeeded by: Manuel Domínguez

Personal details
- Born: 8 November 1862 Asunción, Paraguay
- Died: 16 August 1934 (aged 71) Asunción, Paraguay
- Party: Colorado Party

Andrés Héctor Carvallo Acosta (8 November 1862, Asunción – 16 August 1934) was a Paraguayan politician.

He served as President of the Chamber of Deputies. Later he served as Vice President from 1898 to 1902, and as acting President of Paraguay between 9 January 1902 and 25 November 1902. He was a member of the Colorado Party.

Political offices
Preceded by Facundo Ynsfrán	Vice President of Paraguay; 1898–1902	Succeeded by Manuel Domínguez
Preceded by Emilio Aceval	President of Paraguay; 1902	Succeeded by Juan Antonio Escurra
