= Liberato Marcial Rojas =

President of Paraguay from 1911 to 1912

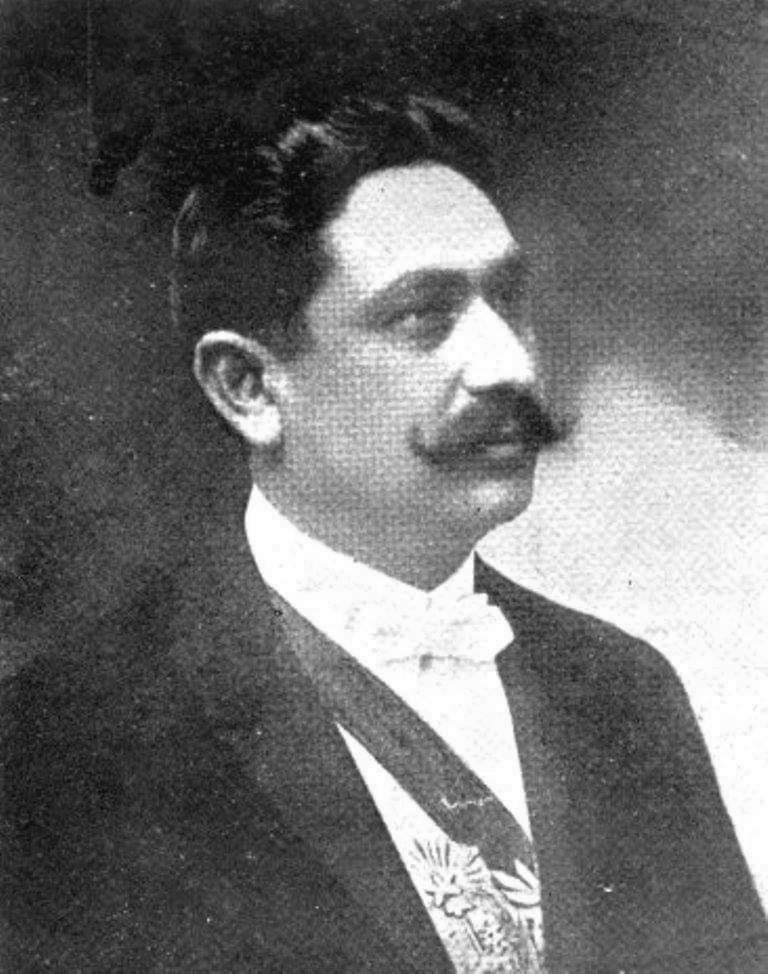
Liberato Marcial Rojas

Liberato Marcial Rojas Cabral (17 August 1870 – 22 August 1922) was a Paraguayan politician and journalist who served as the provisional President of Paraguay from 1911 to 1912. He was a founding member of the Liberal Party in 1887. A civil war occurred during his presidency and he was sent into exile after being deposed.

== Early life and education ==
Liberato Marcial Rojas Cabral was born in Asunción on 17 August 1870 to Gorgonio Rojas and Avelina Cabral. He was born shortly after Paraguay was greatly destroyed during the Paraguayan War. He studied at the Colegio Nacional de la Capital, but there is no record of him graduating. He worked as a surveyor and wrote for the newspapers El Tiempo, El Independiente, and El Pueblo.

== Career ==
Rojas was a founding member of the Democratic Centre in 1887, and this party was reorganised into the Liberal Party. Rojas participated in the 1904 rebellion and had to seek refugee in Argentina's Chaco Province. After the rebellion won he was elected to the Chamber of Deputies of Paraguay. He was later elected to the Senate of Paraguay.

Albino Jara resigned as president in 1911. From 5 July 1911 to 28 February 1912, Rojas served as the acting president. A civil war was fought during his presidency and ended with Rojas being deposed and sent into exile.

== Personal life ==
Rojas married Susana Dolores Silva, with whom he had two children. He died in exile in Montevideo on 22 August 1922. His son Adolfo Rojas Silva was killed by Bolivian troops at Fortín Sorpresa in 1927, and over 50,000 people in Asunción protested his death.

== Works cited ==
=== Books ===
- Meierding, Emily (2020). The Oil Wars Myth: Petroleum and the Causes of International Conflict. Cornell University Press. ISBN 9781501748288.

=== News ===
- Whigham, Thomas (3 May 2026). "Liberato Marcial Rojas y la vocación poética en Paraguay". El Nacional. Archived from the original on 24 May 2026.

=== Web ===
- "Liberato Marcial Rojas". Portal Guarani. Archived from the original on 24 May 2026.

Political offices
Preceded by Albino Jara	President of Paraguay; 1911–1912	Succeeded by Pedro Peña
