= Pedro Peña (politician) =

Paraguayan politician (1864–1943)

Pedro Pablo Peña
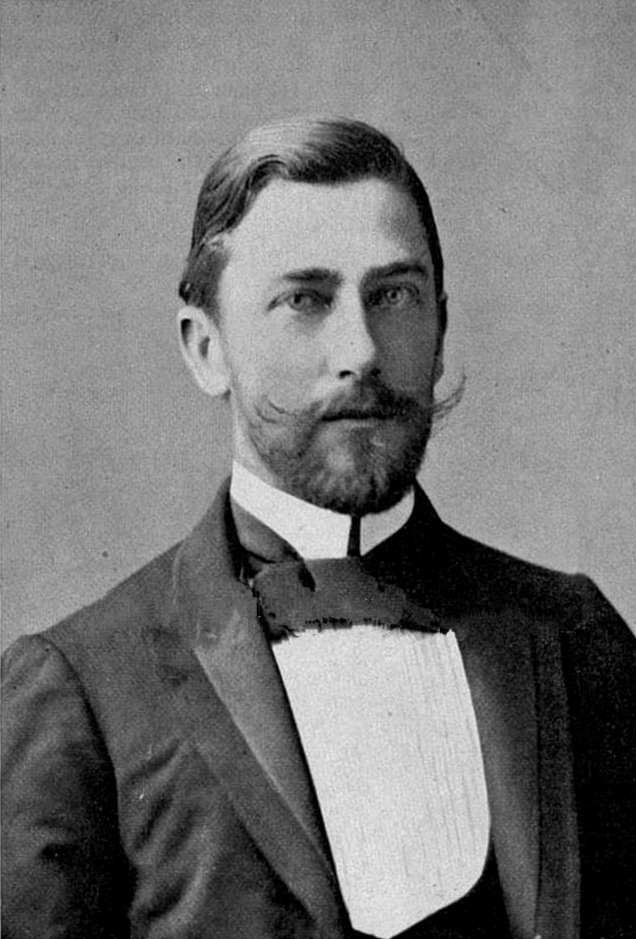

24th President of Paraguay
- In office 28 February 1912 – 22 March 1912
- Vice President: Vacant
- Preceded by: Liberato Marcial Rojas
- Succeeded by: Emiliano González Navero

Personal details
- Born: Pedro Pablo Peña Cañete; 29 June 1864 Asunción, Paraguay
- Died: 29 July 1943 (aged 79) Asunción, Paraguay
- Party: Colorado Party
- Spouse: Carmen del Molino Torres Jovellanos
- Children: 6
- Education: Universidad Nacional de Asunción
- Occupation: Doctor, Diplomat, Politician

Pedro Pablo Peña Cañete (29 June 1864 – 29 July 1943) was a Paraguayan politician who served as the 24th president of Paraguay from February 28, 1912, to March 22, 1912, during the First Paraguayan Civil War. He was a member of the Colorado Party.

Before his brief presidency, Peña was secretary at the Paraguayan Legation in Argentina, dean of the Faculty of Medicine and later president of his alma mater, the National University of Asunción, Paraguayan minister to Brazil (1901–1902 and 1903–1905), minister of foreign affairs (1902–1903) and Paraguayan minister to Chile, Bolivia, and Peru (1905–1908). During and after his tenure, he was president of the executive committee of the Colorado Party from 1912 to 1916, and again from 1921 to 1923.

Political offices
Preceded by Liberato Marcial Rojas	President of Paraguay; 1912	Succeeded by Emiliano González Navero
