= Paraguayan Civil War (1911–1912) =

War won by the rebel Eduardo Schaerer

Date	15 July 1911 – 11 May 1912 (9 months, 3 weeks and 5 days)
Location	Paraguay
Result	Rebel victory: Eduardo Schaerer becomes the 25th president of Paraguay

Belligerents
Paraguayan government	Rebels

Commanders and leaders
Liberato Marcial Rojas; Albino Jara †	Eduardo Schaerer; Manuel Gondra

Casualties and losses
4,000 killed	1,000 killed

The Paraguayan Civil War was a civil war fought in Paraguay from 15 July 1911 to 11 May 1912. It started when members of the Liberal Party, led by Eduardo Schaerer and former president Manuel Gondra revolted against the rule of Liberato Marcial Rojas, and against major Albino Jara. It ended when Albino Jara was ambushed and killed near Paraguarí, allowing Eduardo Schaerer to assume the role of the 25th President of Paraguay.

Meredith Reid Sarkees and Frank Whelon Wayman maintain that the 1911 Paraguayan Civil War was symptomatic of a decades-long period of instability in Paraguay following the Paraguayan War.
