= Paraguayan Civil War (1922–1923) =

1922–1923 civil war in Paraguay

Paraguayan Civil War (1922)
- Part of the Interwar period
Date	27 May 1922 – 10 July 1923 (1 year, 1 month, 1 week and 6 days)
Location	Paraguay
Result	Gondrist victory

Belligerents
(Paraguay) Gondrists	(Paraguay) Schaererists

Commanders and leaders
Eusebio Ayala; Manuel Gondra	Eduardo Schaerer; Adolfo Chirife; Pedro Mendoza

Strength
600 Regular Troops; 250 Navy; 1,000 Marine Workers Union; 1,150 Armed Civilians	1,700 Regular Troops

The Paraguayan Civil War (1922), took place between 27 May 1922 and 10 July 1923, within the borders of Paraguay. It started when supporters of colonel Adolfo Chirife attempted to forcefully restore the implementation of presidential elections canceled by President Eusebio Ayala. Chirife represented the so-called Constitutionalist or Schaererist side ideologically supporting liberal politician Eduardo Schaerer, while troops under Ayala were named Loyalists or Gondrists ideologically pledging allegiance to former President Manuel Gondra. The conflict concluded when Gondrist forces defeated the remnants of the Schaererist army in Asunción.

== Background ==
In the aftermath of the 1904 revolution, the Paraguayan liberal movement entered a period of instability and factional fighting. Between 1904 and 1922, 15 Paraguayan presidents assumed office. The coups of 1908 and 1910 cemented the division of Paraguayan liberals into the "radicales" and "civicos" factions. A further split of the radicales faction into two sub-factions led by Manuel Gondra and Eduardo Schaerer respectively, gradually escalated into a full-scale civil war.

In 1920, Gondra came out victorious in the presidential election. Schaerer immediately attempted to undermine Gondra by forcing the resignation of Interior Minister José Guggiari, Gondra's most vocal supporter. After Gondra's refusal to dismiss Guggiari, Gondra himself resigned, due to the emergence of a split in Paraguay's armed forces. After Vice President Félix Paiva's refusal to assume office, the congress placed senator Eusebio Ayala, a moderate Gondra supporter into interim presidency.

Another crisis ensued when Adolfo Chirife, a supporter of Schaerer, became a presidential candidate. Amassing the support of the Colorado party along with a large percentage of supporters in the Liberal Party, Chirife gathered enough support to ensure a victory in the upcoming elections. When Ayala reacted by blocking implementation of the elections, Schaerer's supporters attempted to restore the electoral process by force.

== Conflict ==
Troops belonging to the 1st, 2nd and 4th military zones totaling 1,700 men, united under the name of the Constitutional Army, declaring its loyalty to Schaerer. Opposing them, loyalist elements of the Paraguayan Navy and the wider Asunción area garrisons pledged allegiance to Gondra. On 27 May 1922, following the failure of two weeks of negotiations between the two sides, Adolfo Chirife ordered his military and civilian supporters in Paraguarí to launch an offensive on the capital, thus beginning a civil war. Passing through Luque, the constitutionalists reached Asunción on June 9. By this time the Gondrists had mustered 600 regular soldiers as well as 1,000 members of the anarcho syndicalist Marine Workers Union. Despite enjoying limited success, the Schaererists were forced to abandon the siege of the barricaded suburbs and on June 14, battles took place in Pirayú and Yaguarón as the Schaererists retreated to Paraguarí.

Between 28 and 29 June 1922, a loyalist Armstrong Whitworth F.K.8 conducted two raids on Paraguarí, first dropping pamphlets and then bombing the city. On 3 July, the same F.K.8 mistakenly bombed train wagons housing imprisoned soldiers who refused to join the Constitutionalist Army. Numerous prisoners were killed or injured in the action. On 8 July 1922, the F.K.8 was shot down over Pirayú, and British pilot Sydney Stewart was killed.

In the aftermath of the July 14 loss of Pirayú and Yaguarón, Schaererists began evacuating their troops from Paraguarí to Villarrica. Between 23 and 24 July, Loyalists overran Constitutionalist positions in Ybytimí and Sapucaí. The Gondristas continued their advance, taking Itapé and Salitre Cué (a village with a railway station), and finally entering Villarrica without firing a single shot on July 31. The town of San Estanislao changed hands several times as opposing cavalries skirmished in the area during early August. The Gondrista Air Force relocated to Villarrica. Reinforced with several Italian World War I veterans including ace Cosimo Rizzotto, it intensified its reconnaissance and bombing missions. On 5 September, a Constitutionalist Ansaldo SVA.5 bombed Salitre-Cué. A Gondrista aircraft of the same model then took off, piloted by British aviator Patrick Hassett, who fired at the bomber and forced it to retreat to Cangó, in an engagement that is considered to be the first recorded dogfight in South America. The following day another Constitutionalist SVA.5 attacked Salitre-cué, only to be forced down near Cangó by Hassett after an intense dogfight, making him the first airmen to shoot down another aircraft over South America. Italian pilot Nicolá Bo would also damage another rebel aircraft on the 25th of September, but was forced to return to Isla Alta after running out of ammunition.

Fighting continued through late October and early November, as Isla Alta and Cangó fell under Gondrist control. Schaererists entrenched themselves in the Caí Puente Coronel Bogado area 30 kilometers north west of Encarnación. On 13 November, a loyalist detachment marched on Caí Puente, while a second column perpetrated a surprise attack on the Constitutionalist rearguard, capturing Carmen del Paraná. Three days later Gondrists took the Schaererirst stronghold of Caí Puente, but many Constitutionalists managed to escape detention, reorganising and moving north towards the unprotected capital. Utilizing rail transport, the Gondrists halted the Schaererist advance, and after heavy fighting in Paraguarí, Piribebuy and Yhú, the defeated Gondrists fell back beyond Carayaó.

On 18 March 1923, the Schaererists mounted their first attack in three months, seizing the under-protected Villarrica. The Constitutionalists then ambushed a 20-wagon supply convoy at Pañetey, killing almost 500 soldiers. On 18 May, after Schaererist commander-in-chief Adolfo Chirife died of pneumonia, newly elected commander Pedro Mendoza initiated an offensive on Asunción. Passing through the densely forested areas of Carapeguá, Itá and San Lorenzo, Mendoza entered the capital on 9 July 1923 without encountering significant resistance. A day later Loyalists counterattacked the capital from the north, routing the Schaererists and effectively ending the war.

As Sapienza (2018) notes: "The insurgents, led by Lt. Col. Brizuela, advanced against only limited resistance, mainly from the police force in the capital, reaching the center of the city by the evening of 9 July. The rebels took the Nu-Guazu air base and captured three aircraft in flying condition, but since they did not have anybody to fly them, they were useless. The following day, with victor apparently in their grasp, the insurgents were undermined by their old nemesis, defective logistic support, and ran out of ammunition and had to retreat in the face of a resolute counter-attack; coincidently as the Loyalist forces from the north arrived at the outskirts of Asunción, taking them in the rear. Rebel morale, always fragile, now collapsed completely, and with it the uprising. Col. Brizuela led what was left of the insurgent army to Villeta where they threw away their weapons before crossing the river to exile in Argentina."

== Bibliography ==
- Sapienza, Antonio Luis (April 1999). "Le role de aviation lors de la révolution de 1922 au Paraguay" [The Role of Aircraft during the 1922 Paraguayan Revolution]. Avions: Toute l'aéronautique et son histoire (in French) (73): 24–26. ISSN 1243-8650.
- Sapienza, Antonio Luis (2018). Aerial Operations in the Revolutions of 1922 & 1947 in Paraguay. The First Dogfights in South America. Warwick: Helion.
