= Manuel Gondra =

President of Paraguay (1871–1927)

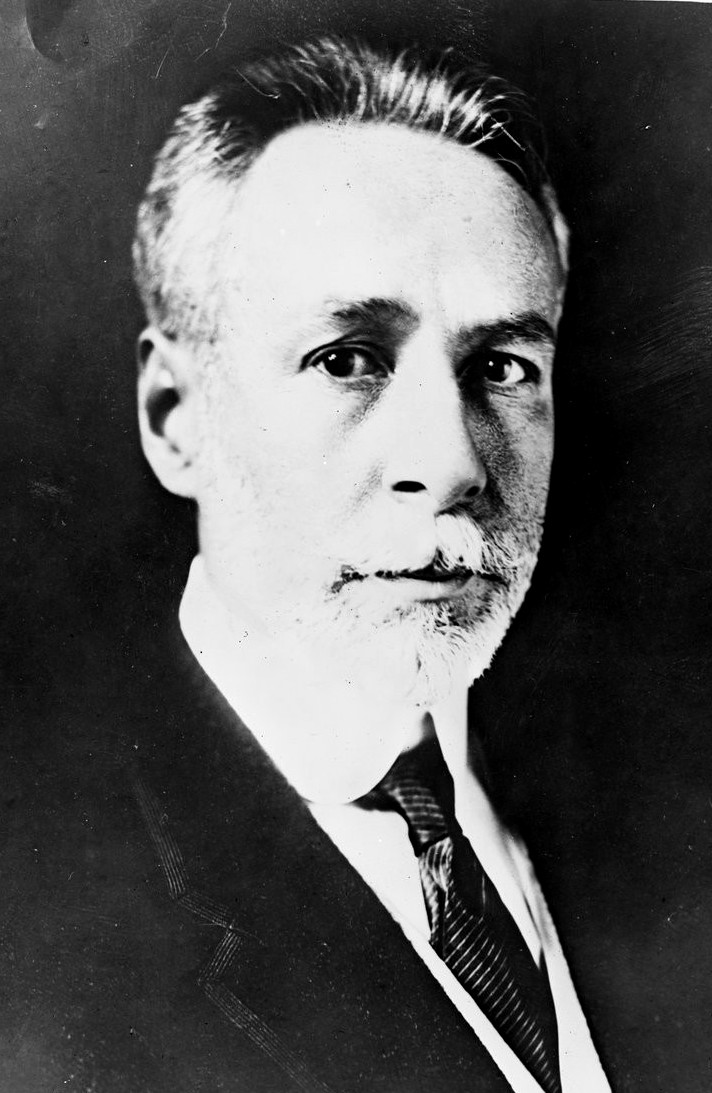
- Portrait, 1920

21st President of Paraguay
- In office 15 August 1920 – 29 October 1921
- Vice President: Félix Paiva
- Preceded by: José Pedro Montero
- Succeeded by: Félix Paiva
- In office 25 November 1910 – 11 January 1911
- Vice President: Juan Bautista Gaona
- Preceded by: Emiliano González Navero
- Succeeded by: Albino Jara

Minister of Foreign Affairs of Paraguay
- In office 1 January 1913 – 23 January 1918
- Preceded by: Eusebio Ayala
- Succeeded by: Eusebio Ayala

Minister of War and Navy of Paraguay
- In office 23 March 1912 – 1 January 1913
- Preceded by: Emiliano González Navero
- Succeeded by: General Patricio Alejandrino Escobar

Minister of the Interior of Paraguay
- In office 4 July 1908 – 1 January 1909
- Preceded by: Manuel Benitez
- Succeeded by: Manuel Franco

Personal details
- Born: Manuel Gondra Pereira; 1 January 1871 Buenos Aires, Argentina
- Died: 8 March 1927 (aged 56) Asunción, Paraguay
- Party: Liberal Party
- Spouse: Emilia Victoria Alfaro
- Children: 4
- Profession: Author, Journalist, Politician Other offices: 1905-1908: Plenipotentiary ambassador to Brazil; Paraguayan ambassador to the United States

Manuel Gondra Pereira (1 January 1871 – 8 March 1927) was the 21st President of Paraguay who served from 25 November 1910 to 11 January 1911 and again from 15 August 1920 to 29 October 1921. Born in Buenos Aires, he was also an author, a journalist and a member of the Liberal Party. His first presidency was ended by the rise of Albino Jara, and his second presidency by the Paraguayan Civil War of 1922, in which he led the Gondrist faction to victory.

Manuel Gondra died on 8 March 1927 in Asunción.

== Early life and career ==
Manuel Gondra was born on the 1 January 1871, Buenos Aires. Although he did well in school and was reportedly a good student, he chose to leave schooling, never achieving a diploma. Rather, he chose to be a self-taught scholar of many subjects, including the social sciences, history of the Americas, and geography. He received some success in this field. However, his career as an intellectual came to a pause when he joined the Revolution of 1904 on the side of the Liberals. After this, he became the Plenipotentiary ambassador to Brazil in 1905. His diligence would see him later be assigned as the Minister of the Interior, then Minister of War and Navy, and then Minister of Foreign Affairs of Paraguay.

In 1917 he was also made ambassador to the United States, a position he held until his second term as president started.

== Presidential career ==
=== First tenure ===
Manuel Gondra's initial candidacy was widely supported by both intellectuals and the citizenry of Paraguay. He assumed office on 25 November 1910. As president of a Paraguay reeling from internal crises, Gondra was written by Arturo Bray as having an "abulic temperament, to the despair of his friends, which has cost the country so much blood."

Gondra's presidency came to an end when Colonel Albino Jara launched a coup against him on 17 August 1911, despite sharing similar political agenda. This was a result of the collapsing liberal movement in Paraguay.

=== Second tenure ===
After much of the chaos following Jara's coup subsided, Manuel Gondra sought re-election. His campaign was met with victory, and he assumed office on 15 August 1920. However, this was not without its controversy. Immediately following, the supporters of the opposing candidate, schaereristas, and their leader Eduardo Schaerer (who Gondra formerly served under) erupted into violence, in what became the Paraguayan Civil War. In this emerging civil war, Eduardo Schaerer pressured the Interior Minister José Guggiari (a close ally) to resign, but Gondra resisted. For this pressure and lost power, he was forced into resignation on 29 October 1921.

However, Gondra's disciples were to run the country after his resignation. The Gondrista faction of the party controlled government from 1921 to 1936.
