= Albino Jara =

President of Paraguay (1877–1912)

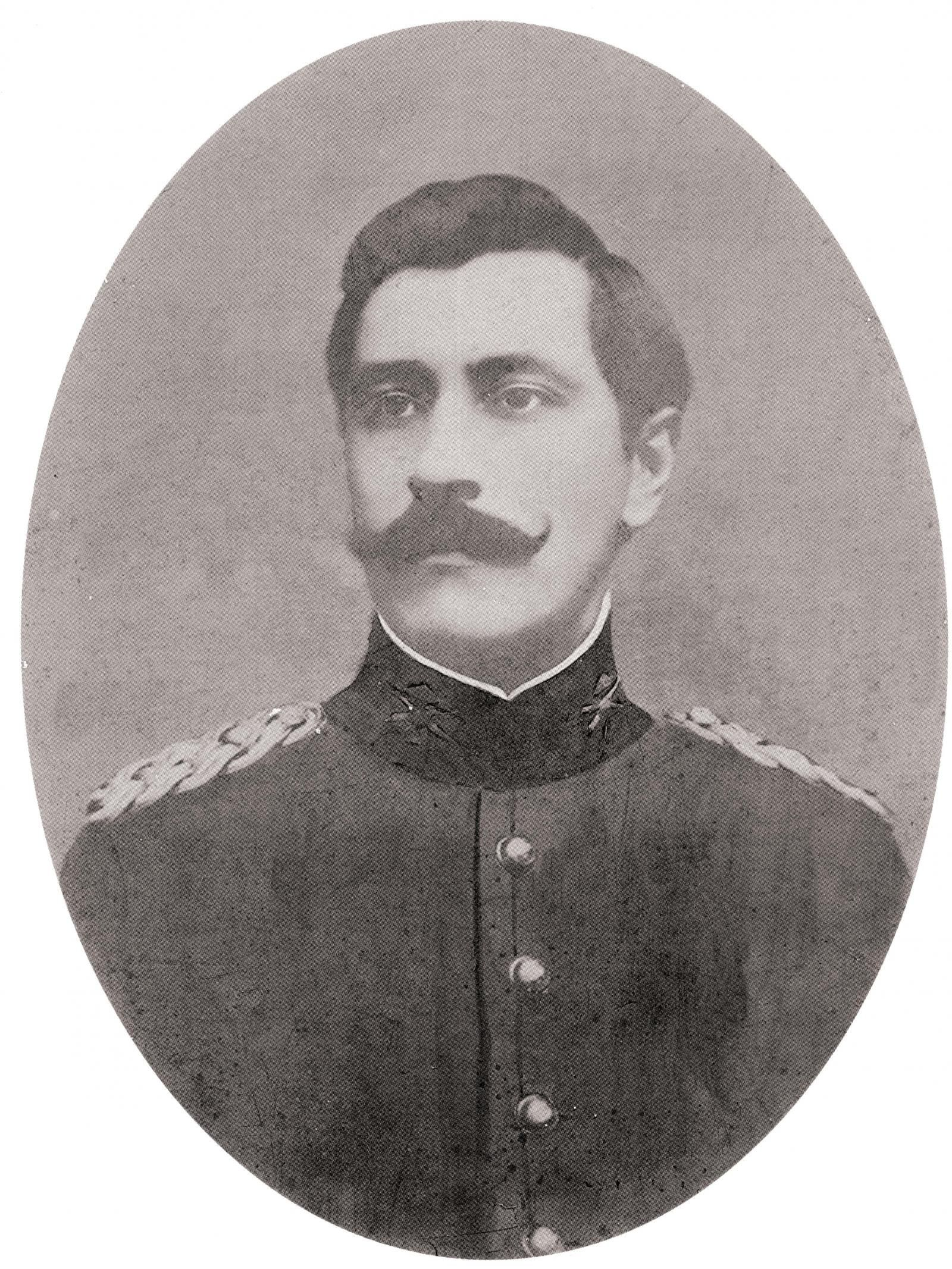

Colonel Albino Jara Benegas (28 February 1877 – 15 May 1912) was provisional President of Paraguay from 19 January 1911 to 5 July 1911. A military official, he was a member of the Liberal Party. He came to power in the 1911 military coup wherein Jara rebelled against the government when Manuel Gondra's government sought his arrest.

Albino Jara fought in the Revolution of 1904 as a Major, supporting the Liberals. He, a radical, had grown discontent over Liberal inaction leading up to and during the presidency of Manuel Gondra. So, on 21 February 1911, Jara, now a Colonel, launched a military coup against him. This was successful, and he assumed office on 19 January 1911.

However, the instability caused by this and general dislike for Jara caused a rebellion to stir. This new rebellion was launched in Concepción on 21 February 1911 and was led by Adolfo Riquelme and Major Alfredo Medina. This rebellion gathered large numbers of partisans, and reached its highest point on 7 March 1911, when over 2,000 government soldiers defeated approximately 800 partisans in Yuty. The revolution was also hampered by the capture of Adolfo Riquelme and 11 associates, who were all executed. Shortly thereafter (20 March 1911), martial law was declared. This state of rebellion was not helped when reports of his rape of a woman came out, causing additional rioting. Jara, having lost much political power and control, resigned. He chose Liberato Marcial Rojas as his successor following widespread rebellion and unrest.

Political offices
Preceded by Manuel Gondra	President of Paraguay; 1911	Succeeded by Liberato Marcial Rojas
