= Félix Paiva =

Paraguayan politician (1877–1965)

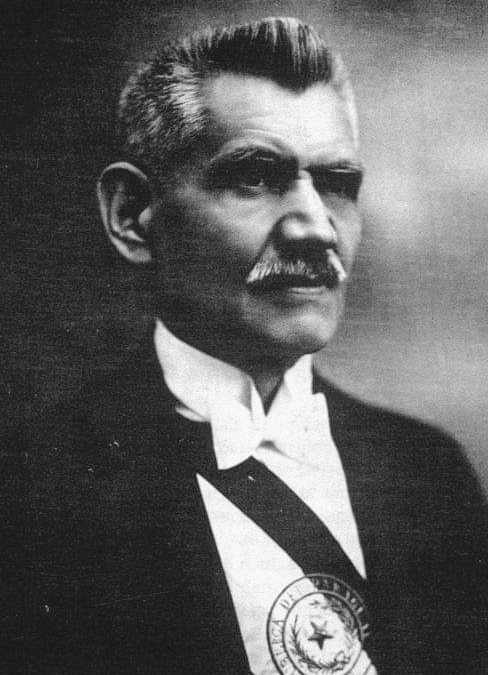
- Portrait, c. 1937–1939

28th President of Paraguay
- In office 15 August 1937 – 15 August 1939
- Preceded by: Rafael Franco
- Succeeded by: José Félix Estigarribia
- In office 29 October 1921 – 7 November 1921
- Preceded by: Manuel Gondra
- Succeeded by: Eusebio Ayala

15th Vice President of Paraguay
- In office 15 August 1920 – 29 October 1921
- President: Manuel Gondra
- Preceded by: José Pedro Montero (1919)
- Succeeded by: Manuel Burgos (1924)

Personal details
- Born: 21 February 1877 Caazapá, Paraguay
- Died: 2 November 1965 (aged 88) Asunción, Paraguay
- Party: Liberal Party
- Spouse: Silvia Esther Heisecke
- Awards: Grand Cross of the National Order of Merit

Félix Paiva (21 February 1877 – 2 November 1965) was a Paraguayan politician from the Liberal Party who served as the 30th President of Paraguay from August 15th 1937 to August 15th 1939

His mother was Martina Paiva. He was married to Silvia Esther Heisecke, and had 6 sons, Armando, Aníbal, Raúl, Augusto César, Milcíades Adolfo and Danilo Victor. He founded the newspapers El Diario and El Orden (which would later be renamed El País).

He studied law at, worked as university teacher and was dean of the National University of Asuncion and president of the Supreme Court. In his political career he was a minister in many occasions, president of the Senate, Vice President of Paraguay between 1920 and 1921, and also President of Paraguay from 29 October 1921 to 7 November 1921 and again from 15 August 1937 to 15 August 1939.

He became president after the overthrow of Rafael Franco. In his term he restored the Constitution of 1870. On 10 October 1938, the Congress of Paraguay confirmed Paiva as provisional president. He signed a peace agreement with Bolivia in 1938, which concluded the Chaco War.

Preceded by José Pedro Montero	Vice President of Paraguay; 1920–1921	Succeeded by Manuel Burgos
Preceded by Rafael Franco	President of Paraguay; 1937–1939	Succeeded by José Félix Estigarribia
