= Francisco Núñez (luthier) =

Spanish luthier (1841–1919)

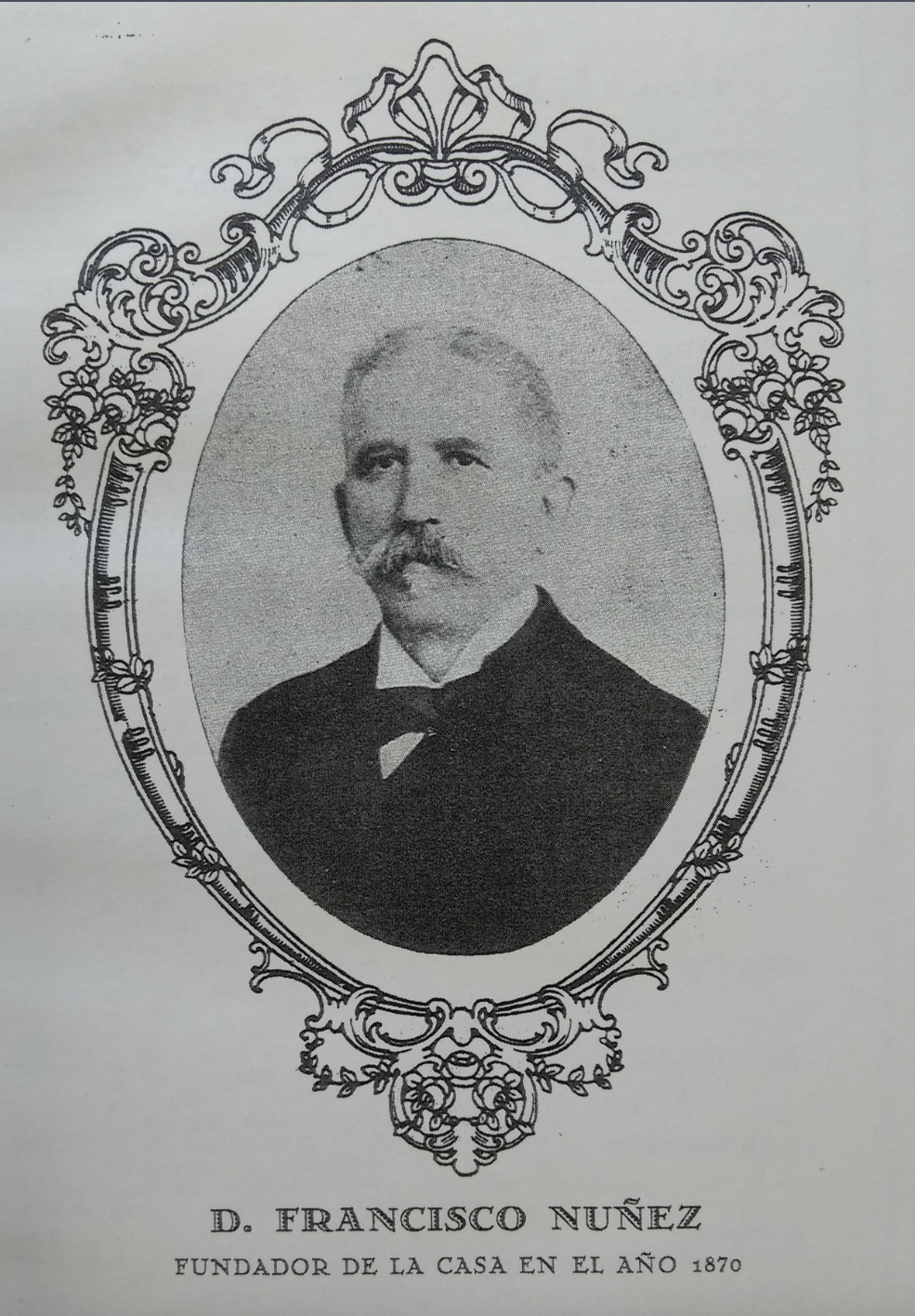
- Born: 9 April 1841; Santa María de Tebra, Spain
- Died: 22 June 1919 (aged 78); Buenos Aires, Argentina
- Other name: Francisco Núñez Rodríguez
- Occupation: Luthier

Francisco Núñez Rodríguez (Santa María de Tebra, Pontevedra, Spain, 9 April 1841 – Buenos Aires, Argentina, 22 June 1919) was a Spanish luthier who settled in Argentina. He was the founder of the renowned Casa Núñez.

== Life ==
=== Early life ===
Núñez Rodríguez was born in Santa María de Tebra, in the Galician province of Pontevedra. He was the son of Dionisio Núñez and María Rosa Rodríguez. In 1858, he emigrated to the Argentine Republic, settling in the city of Buenos Aires. During his early years in the country, he worked in various trades, including as a baker.

He later entered the woodworking industry, where he discovered his passion for luthiery. He began his apprenticeship in the workshop of the builder Ramírez, father-in-law of the guitarist Gaspar Sagreras, where he acquired the basic knowledge of the craft.

=== Founding of Casa Núñez ===
In 1870, he founded a guitar-making workshop together with his brother and a partner. Shortly afterward, both left the business due to limited commercial prospects, but Núñez continued the project on his own.

In 1894, he made a trip to Europe, where he acquired modern machinery that enabled large-scale production of instruments. His workshop, located at the former Cuyo Street 726 in Buenos Aires (now Sarmiento Street 1628), became a reference point for guitarists and enthusiasts.

=== Rise and decline ===
The production at Casa Núñez reached remarkable figures: around one thousand guitars were made per week, with prices ranging from three to four hundred pesos. Of that number, only twenty to thirty guitars per year were built personally by Núñez, and these were considered high-quality pieces, valued even above those of Antonio de Torres.

In 1910, he was offered 400,000 pesos for the transfer of his company, an offer he rejected. However, around 1916, the company went bankrupt due to poor management by some of his relatives, and Núñez was left ruined.

Francisco Núñez Rodríguez died on 22 June 1919 in Buenos Aires, in poverty.

=== Legacy ===
Núñez guitars were used by renowned guitarists of the time, such as Juan Alais (known as "Juan el Inglés"), Pedro M. Quijano, Julio S. Sagreras, and Juan Valler, among others. Casa Núñez was also frequented by personalities from the intellectual, artistic, and political spheres, such as General Francisco Leyría, Doctors Echayde and Marco, and various distinguished enthusiasts.

One of the guitars built by Núñez, acquired by Dr. Roberto Ezcurra, won awards in international competitions. Despite some pieces having manufacturing defects, the sound of his instruments was considered exceptional.

The newspaper El País, in an article published on 19 August 1900, defined him as a "meritorious industrialist" who managed to combine technical perfection, business expansion, and a genuine artistic spirit. The same source mentions that his facilities were equipped with temperature and humidity controls to guarantee the quality of the instruments' construction.

Casa Núñez, founded by Francisco Núñez, continued in operation until its closure in 2024.
