= History of Paraguay =

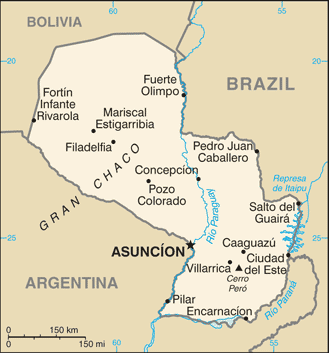
Paraguay

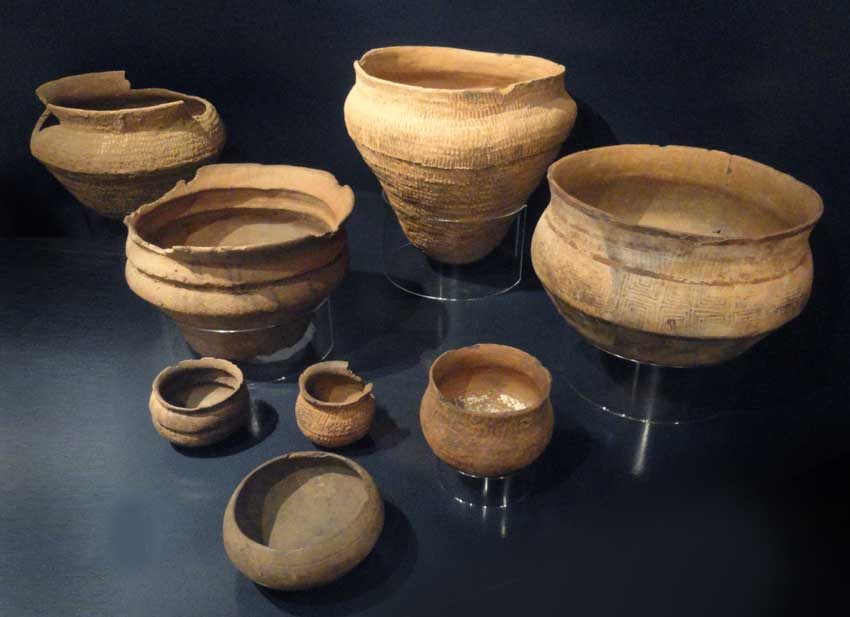
Guaraní ceramics

The history of Paraguay encompasses thousands of years of human habitation. Both agricultural and nomadic Guaycuruan lived in the region at the time of the Spanish Conquest. It became a relatively neglected part of the Spanish Empire due to its isolation and lack of mineral wealth; nonetheless, a small group of Spanish settlers came to reside in the area, increasingly intermarrying with native women to produce a mestizo population. In the 17th and 18th centuries, Jesuit missionaries organized the natives into planned communities known as reductions, which to this day draw controversy for their massive scope and means of control of the population.

In the early nineteenth century, Paraguay participated in the Spanish American wars of independence, and, newly independent, came under the domination of José Gaspar Rodríguez de Francia, who in his absolute rule almost entirely cut off the new nation from the world. After Francia's death in 1840, Paraguay came under the rule of Carlos Antonio López and, later, his son Francisco Solano López, who proceeded to embroil the nation in a war against Brazil, Argentina, and Uruguay between 1864 and 1870 which culminated in a Paraguayan defeat with massive territorial and human losses. Paraguay became a flawed democracy, in a regime imposed by its enemies.

In the 1930s, Paraguay had its territory encroached and soon found itself in the Chaco War with Bolivia, which ended in a Paraguayan victory. General Alfredo Stroessner, a veteran of that conflict, came to power in 1954 through a coup, and governed until 1989, a year in which another coup toppled him. A new constitution was adopted in 1992, moving the country towards being a multi party democracy. Since then, Paraguay has to a certain extent avoided the political strife and strongman rule that characterized much of its history, though the Economist Intelligence Unit rates the country as a "hybrid regime" as of 2024.

== Pre-Columbian and Colonial eras ==
=== Native peoples ===
In the 16th century, the Guaraní people were dispersed throughout the forests of the Río de la Plata Basin. Their pre-Columbian population is estimated at between 300,000 and one million. With the arrival of Europeans, their population rapidly decreased due to epidemics of European diseases. The Guaraní were united only by language and cultural similarities; no political structure existed above the village level, and they were a semi-sedentary agricultural people.

Although the Guaraní initially resisted Spanish incursions into their lands, two characteristics influenced their early cooperation with the Europeans. First, the Guaraní were themselves warlike, but they were threatened by hostile tribes around them and by slave raiders. The Spanish, especially Christian missionaries, offered a degree of security to the Guaraní. Second, the Guaraní had a custom of exchanging women among themselves and with outsiders to cement alliances. This facilitated a proliferation of sexual relations of Guaraní women with Spanish men. As the colony expanded, this practice gave way to the rancheadas—violent mass deportations of indigenous women who were traded as commodities and exported as slaves to Portuguese settlements on the Atlantic coast; modern scholars characterize the resulting mestizo society as a product of sexual and economic coercion rather than mutual exchange. The mestizo offspring of Spanish/Guaraní unions had the legal rights of Spaniards, and they, together with the Spanish, subjected the Guaraní population to the encomienda system of forced labor after 1556 and the reductions (fortified settlements) of Christian missionaries beginning in the 1580s.

The Gran Chaco, a semi-arid flatland west of the Paraguay River, was the home of the Guaycuru peoples. The most important of the Guaycuru in Paraguay were the Payaguá, a riverine people ranging for 1,600 km (990 miles) up and down the Paraguay River, and the Mbayá who lived in northwest Paraguay. The Guaycuru tribes were nomadic and warlike. The Mbayá developed a horse culture in the 17th century while the Payaguá made travel up and down the Paraguay River dangerous. These tribes frequently raided the Spanish settlers and Guaraní farmers. They resisted the reductions and christianity of the missionaries and were a threat to the Spanish and other native peoples for more than 300 years.

=== Early explorers and conquistadors ===
Much of the earliest written history of Paraguay comes from records of the Spanish colonization, beginning in 1516 with the Juan Díaz de Solís' failed expedition to the Río de la Plata. On the home voyage, after Solís' death, one of the vessels was wrecked off Santa Catarina Island near the Brazilian coast. Among the survivors was Aleixo Garcia, a Portuguese adventurer who acquired a working knowledge of the Guaraní language. Garcia was intrigued by reports of "the White King" who supposedly lived far to the west and governed cities of wealth and splendor, a reference to the Inca Empire.

In 1524, Garcia led a Guaraní invasion of the Inca Empire. Garcia's group discovered Iguazú Falls, crossed the Río Paraná and arrived at the site of Asunción, the future capital of the country, thirteen years before it was founded. At Asunción, the Guaraní gathered an army of 2,000 men and penetrated the outer defenses of the Inca Empire on the eastern slopes of the Andes, though Garcia ended up murdered by his allies. The explorer Sebastian Cabot was attracted to the Río Paraguay two years later, when he was sailing to Asia and heard of Garcia's exploits. He decided that the Río de la Plata might provide passage to the Pacific, and, eager to win the riches of the Incas, would become the first European to explore that estuary. Finding silver amongst the Guaraní there, he renamed the river Río de la Plata.

Cabot returned to Spain in 1530 and told Emperor Charles V about his discoveries. Charles gave permission to Pedro de Mendoza, a Spanish noble, to mount an expedition to the Plata basin. The emperor also named Mendoza governor of the Governorate of New Andalusia, a province which controlled roughly a sixth of Spanish South America, and granted him the right to name his successor. Mendoza proved to be unsuitable as a leader, and his cruelty undermined the expedition. In February 1536 Mendoza built a fort, the first Spanish settlement in South America, at a place of poor anchorage on the southern side of the Plata estuary on an inhospitable dead-level plain. Dusty in the dry season, a bog in the rains, the place was inhabited by the Querandí people, who resisted the Spaniards. The Spanish named the outpost Buenos Aires (Nuestra Señora del Buen Ayre).

Juan de Salazar de Espinosa and Gonzalo de Mendoza, who had been part of Pedro de Mendoza's expedition, explored the Paraguay River after the latter's departure. They descended the river, stopping at an anchorage. They commenced building a fort there on 15 August 1537, the date of the Feast of the Assumption, and called it Asunción. Asunción would be the province and later Paraguay's capital thenceforth.

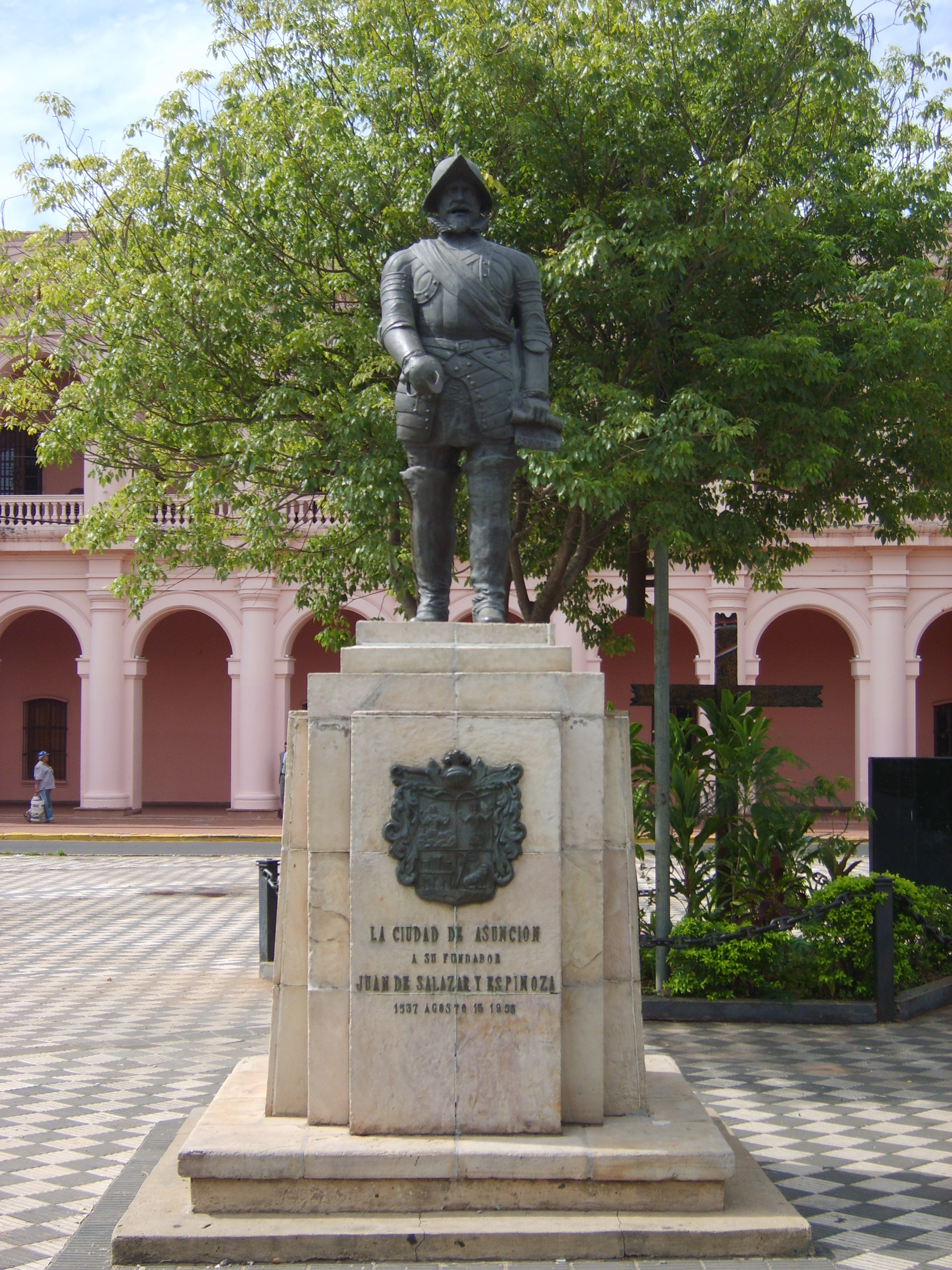
A statue honoring Juan de Salazar y Espinoza in Asunción

Within 20 years, the new town had a population of about 1,500. Transcontinental shipments of silver passed through Asunción en route from Peru to Europe. Asunción became the center of the Governorate of Guayrá in 1617, a province of the Spanish Empire which also encompassed present-day Paraná; Asunción was the base for the colonization of this part of South America; from Asunción, they also moved northwestward across the Chaco to found Santa Cruz in present-day Bolivia; eastward to occupy the rest of present-day Paraguay; and southward along the river to re-found Buenos Aires, which had been abandoned by its inhabitants in 1541 in favor of Asunción.

=== Jesuit missions among the Guaraní ===
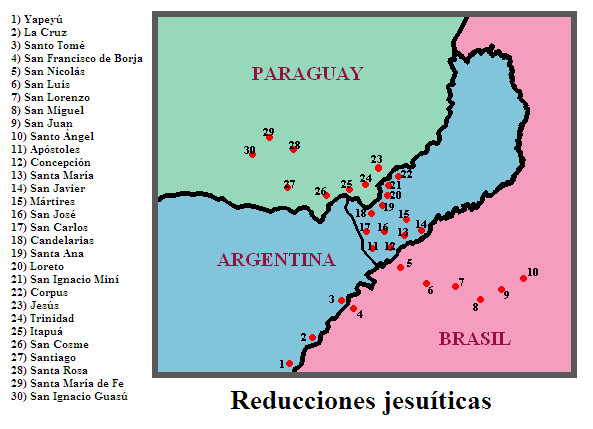
Locations of Jesuit reductions

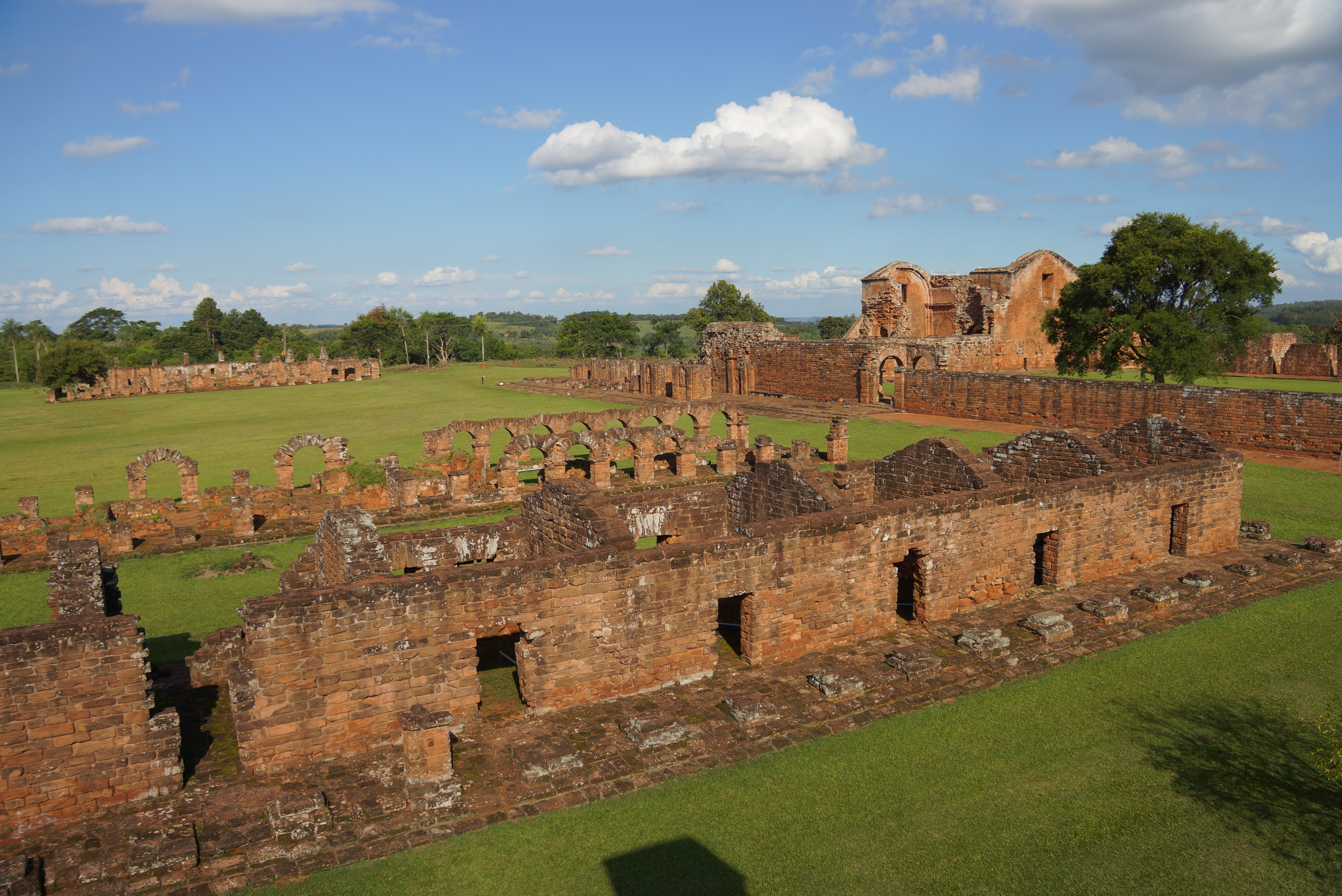
Jesuit reduction of Trinidad

The Guaraní of eastern Paraguay and neighboring Brazil and Argentina were in crisis in the early 17th century. Recurrent epidemics of European diseases had reduced their population greatly and the forced labor of the encomiendas by the Spanish and mestizo colonists had made virtual slaves of many. Franciscan missionaries began establishing missions called reductions in the 1580s. The first Jesuits arrived in Asunción in 1588 and founded the mission (or reduction) of San Ignacio Guazú, their first, in 1609. The objectives of the Jesuits were to christianize the Guaraní, impose European values and customs on them, and isolate and protect them from European colonists and slavers. These relations were troublesome, with the case of India Juliana, who killed a Spanish colonist, confessed to it, was set free, and later executed, being particularly symbolic as regards them.

In addition to recurrent epidemics, the Guaraní were threatened by the bandeirantes from Brazil, who captured natives and sold them as slaves in modern Brazil. Initially, the richly populated Jesuit missions had few defenses against the slavers and thousands of Guaraní were captured and enslaved. Beginning in 1631, the Jesuits moved their missions from the Guayrá province (present day Brazil and Paraguay), about 500 km (310 miles) southwest to the three borders region of Paraguay, Argentina, and Brazil. About 10,000 of 30,000 Guaraní in the missions chose to accompany the Jesuits. In 1641 and 1642, armed by the Jesuits, Guaraní armies defeated the bandeirantes and ended the worst of the slave trade in their region. From this point on the Jesuit missions enjoyed growth and prosperity, punctuated by epidemics. At the peak of their importance in 1732, the Jesuits presided over 141,000 Guaraní (and some other peoples) in about 30 missions. The missions are controversial, with their detractors accusing them of enslaving the Guaraní and taking away, or at least changing, their way of life.

The Comunero Revolt (1721–1735) was a serious protest by Spanish and mestizo Paraguayans against the Jesuit missions. The residents of Paraguay violently protested the pro-Jesuit government of Paraguay, Jesuit control of Guaraní labor, and what they regarded as unfair competition for products such as yerba mate, as the Jesuits did not have to pay any taxes to the Spanish crown. Although the revolt ultimately failed and the missions remained, the Jesuits were expelled from institutions they had created in Asunción. In 1767, Charles III of Spain expelled the Jesuits from the Americas. The expulsion was part of an effort in the Bourbon Reforms to assert more Spanish control over its American colonies. In total, 78 Jesuits departed from the 30 remaining missions leaving behind 89,000 Guaraní.

Most Guaraní initially welcomed the expulsion of the Jesuits. Spanish authorities made promises to Guaraní leaders and gained their support. Within two years, however, the financial situation of the former missions was deteriorating and Guaraní began leaving them seeking both freedom and higher wages. A decree in 1800 freed the Guaraní still in the missions from their communal obligation to labor. By 1840, the former missions were in ruins. While some Guaraní were employed outside them, many families were impoverished. A growing number of mestizos occupied what had formerly been mission lands. In 1848, Paraguayan President Carlos Antonio López declared that all of the country's indigenous peoples were citizens of Paraguay and distributed the last of the missions' communal lands.

=== Colonial decline ===
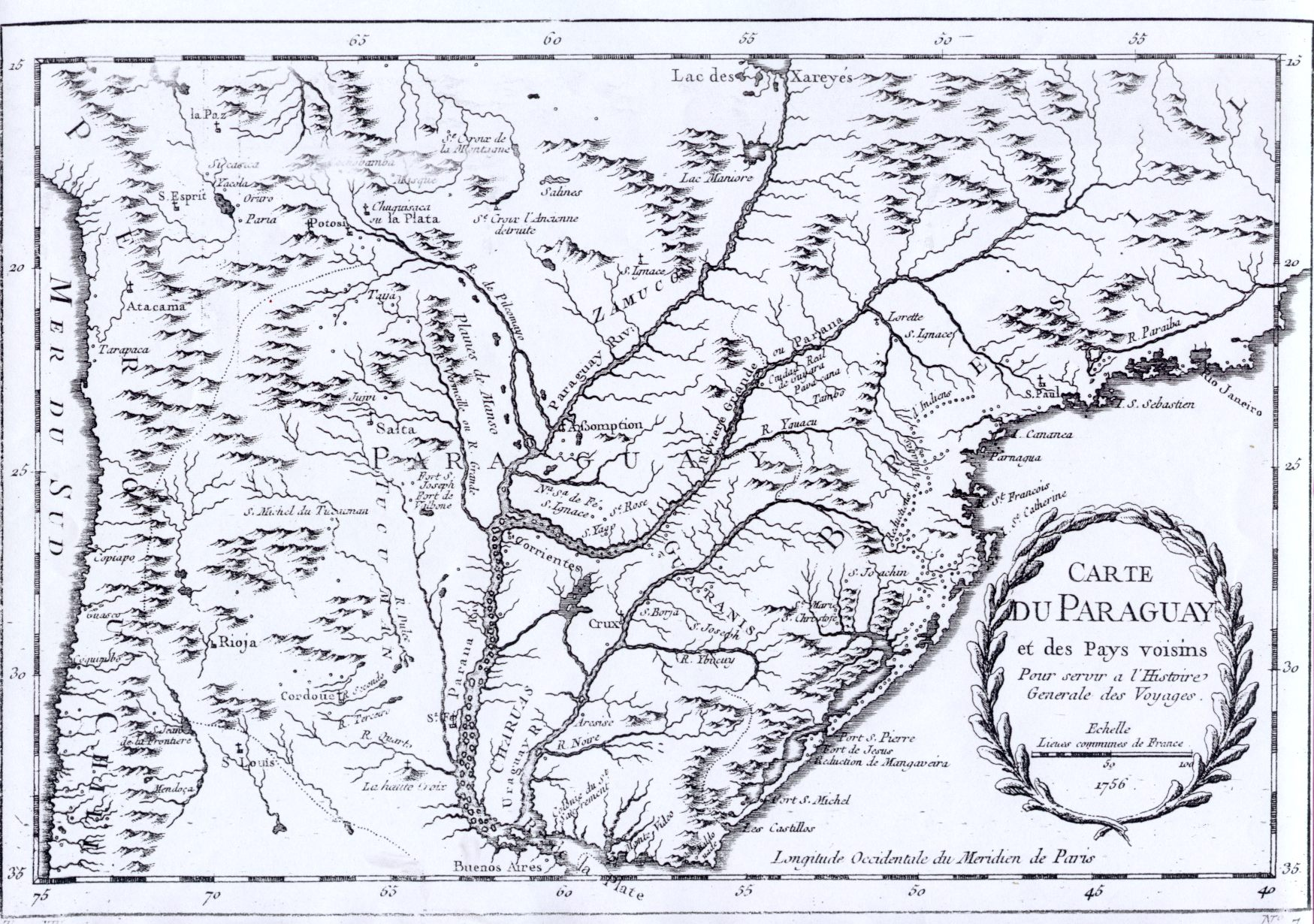
Map of Paraguay and surrounding regions, 1756

After Buenos Aires was refounded in 1580, Asunción gradually deteriorated in importance. In 1617, when the Governorate of the Río de la Plata was divided, Asunción lost control of the Río de la Plata estuary and became dependent on Buenos Aires for maritime shipping. In 1776, the crown created the Viceroyalty of Río de la Plata; Paraguay, which had been subordinate to Lima in modern Peru, now became a provincial outpost of Buenos Aires. Located at the periphery of the empire, Paraguay served as a buffer state. The Portuguese blocked Paraguayan territorial expansion in the north, native tribes blocked it – until their expulsion – in the south, and the Jesuits blocked it in the east; finally, there was the inhospitable Chaco to the west.

The Viceroyalty of Peru and the Real Audiencia of Charcas had nominal authority over Paraguay, while Madrid largely neglected it, preferring to avoid the effort and expense of governing and defending a remote colony that had proved to have little value. The governors of Paraguay had no royal troops at their disposal and were instead dependent on a colonist militia. As a result of its distance from the rest of the empire, Paraguay had little control over important decisions that affected its economy. Spain appropriated much of Paraguay's wealth through burdensome taxes and regulations, and subordination to Buenos Aires made commerce much more difficult than it should have been. The result was dire poverty in Paraguay.

== Independence ==
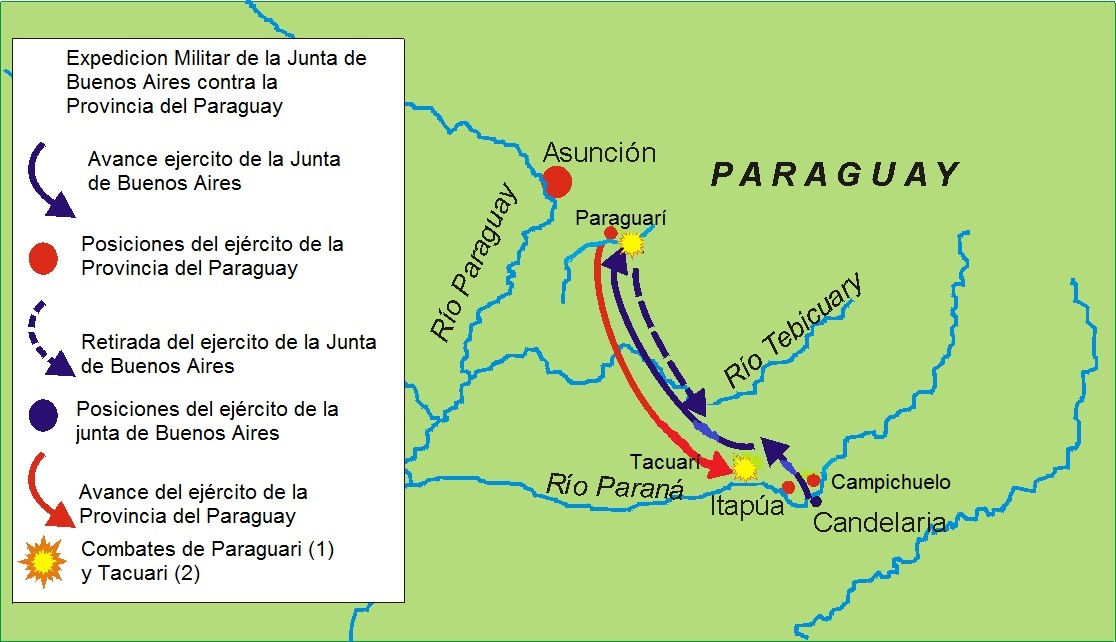
Belgrano's campaign against Paraguay

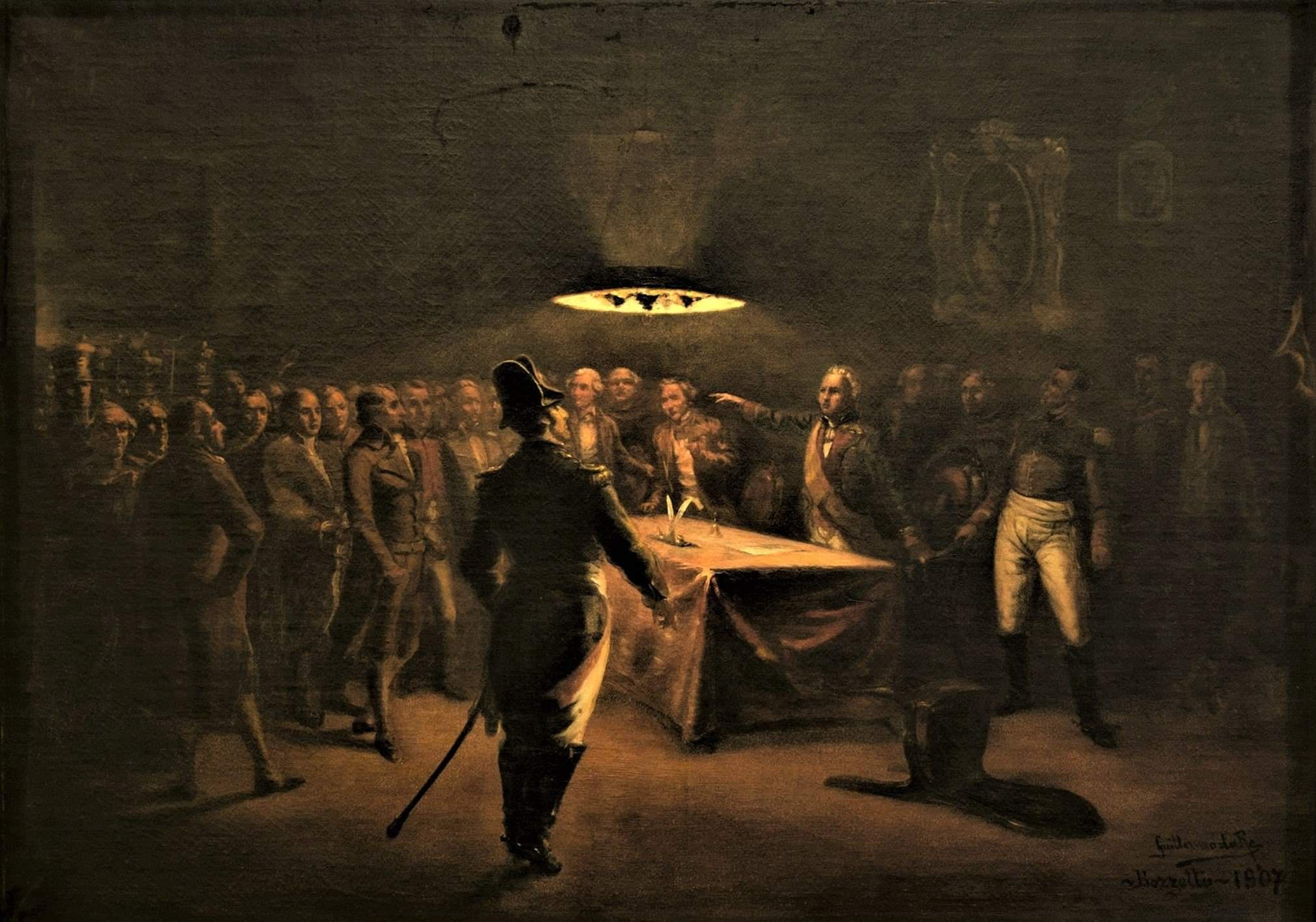
Pedro Juan Caballero demands shared power from governor Velasco on the night of 14 May 1811

The rise of Napoleon Bonaparte, and the subsequent wars in Europe, weakened Spain's ability to maintain contact with and defend and control its colonies. The British invasions of the River Plate of 1806–7 were repulsed by the local colonial troops and volunteer militias, including a Paraguayan contingent, without help from Spain.

Among the many causes of the May Revolution, the spark that initiated the Argentine War of Independence and Paraguay's movement towards independence, were Napoleon's invasion of Spain in 1808, the capture of the Spanish king, Ferdinand VII, and Napoleon's attempt to put his brother Joseph Bonaparte on the Spanish throne, which severed the major remaining links between the metropolis and the colonies as Joseph had no supporters in Spanish America. Without a king, the entire colonial system lost its legitimacy, and colonies revolted. The Buenos Aires open cabildo deposed the Spanish viceroy on 25 May 1810, vowing to rule in the name of Ferdinand VII. The May Revolution eventually led to the creation of the United Provinces of the Río de la Plata which wanted to bring the province of Paraguay under its control. News of the revolutionary events in Buenos Aires stunned royalist citizens of Asunción. Discontent with the Spanish monarchy was put aside in favor of the much bigger rivalry with the city of Buenos Aires.

The porteños failed at their effort to extend control over Paraguay by choosing José Espínola y Peña as their spokesman in Asunción. Espínola was "perhaps the most hated Paraguayan of his era", according to John Hoyt Williams. Espínola's reception in Asunción was less than cordial, partly because he was closely linked to a hated ex-governor, Lázaro de Rivera. Barely escaping arrest in Paraguay, Espínola fled back to Buenos Aires and lied about the extent of porteño popularity in Paraguay, causing the Buenos Aires ruling junta to decide to launch the Paraguay campaign, sending 700 troops under General Manuel Belgrano to subdue Asunción. Loyalist Paraguayan troops, reinforced by locals, soundly thrashed the porteños at the Battles of Paraguarí and Tacuarí. Officers from both sides openly fraternized during the campaign and from these contacts the Paraguayans learned that Spanish dominance in South America was ending, and that they now held the real power; ideologically, they were inspired by the ideals of the French Revolution.

The actions of the last Spanish governor Bernardo de Velasco only further agitated local politicians and military officers. Believing that the Paraguayan officers posed a threat to his rule, Governor Velasco dispersed and disarmed local forces and sent most of the mobilized soldiers home without paying them for their service. Velasco had previously lost face when, believing that Belgrano had won at Paraguarí, he fled the battlefield and caused a panic in Asunción. The last straw was Velasco's discussions with the Brazilian Portuguese, from whom he asked for military and financial help in order to maintain Spanish colonial rule in Paraguay. This move ignited a military uprising in Asunción on 14 May 1811 and formation of a power-sharing junta. On 17 May a public proclamation informed people that a ruling junta, consisting of Governor Velasco, Gaspar Rodriguez de Francia and Army captain Juan Valeriano de Zeballos had been created.

== Era of dictatorships (1814–1870) ==
=== Francia ===
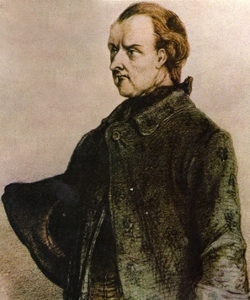
Lithograph of José Gaspar Rodríguez de Francia, a 19th-century ruler of Paraguay, wearing a dark cloak

Upon its independence, Paraguay was underdeveloped in comparison with its neighbors. Most residents of Asunción and virtually all rural inhabitants were illiterate. University education was limited to the very few who could afford studies at the University of Córdoba, in Argentina. Very few people had any experience in government, finance, or diplomacy. The country was surrounded by hostile neighbors, from the indigenous tribes of the Chaco to the Argentine Confederation and the Empire of Brazil. Strong measures were needed in order to preserve independence.

After the uprising of 14–15 May 1811, Francia became a member of the ruling junta. Although the landowners, the hacendados, initially held the most power, Francia attracted support from the nation's peasants. Francia outwitted porteño diplomats in the negotiations that produced the treaty of 11 October 1811 (in which Argentina implicitly recognized Paraguayan independence in return for vague promises of a military alliance), Eventually, a Third National Congress was held on 3–4 October 1814 and replaced the two-man consulate with a one-man dictatorship, to which Francia was elected.

==== El Supremo Dictador ====
Francia detested the political culture of the old regime and considered himself a revolutionary. He admired and emulated the most radical elements of the French Revolution. Some commentators did compare him to the Jacobin Maximilien de Robespierre. In 1820, Francia's security system uncovered and quickly crushed a plot by the elite to assassinate El Supremo, as he was then known. Francia arrested almost 200 prominent Paraguayans among whom were most of the leading figures of the 1811 independence movement. In 1821 Francia again struck against the Spanish-born elite, summoning all of Paraguay's 300 or so peninsulares to Asunción's main square, where he accused them of treason, had them arrested, and held them in jail for months. They were released only after agreeing to pay an enormous collective indemnity of 100,000 pesos, an amount so large that, together with the long reclusion imposed upon them, was enough to break their predominance in the Paraguayan economy. Eventually, El Supremo came to personally control every aspect of Paraguayan public life. No decision at the state level could be made without his approval.

In order to destroy the colonial racial hierarchy, Francia forbade Europeans from marrying other Europeans, thus forcing the élite to choose spouses from the local population. He sealed Paraguay's borders to the outside world and executed anyone who attempted to leave. Foreigners who managed to enter Paraguay were not allowed to leave afterwards. Both of these decisions helped to solidify the Paraguayan identity. All inhabitants had to live within the borders of Paraguay and build a new, modern Paraguayan society, in which Hispanic and Guaraní roots were equally strong.

Paraguayan international trade became harshly restricted, ruining exporters of yerba maté and tobacco. These measures fell most harshly on the members of the former ruling class of church officials, military officers, merchants, and large landowners. Another of Francia's targets was the Catholic Church, which had provided an essential support to Spanish rule by spreading the doctrine of the "divine right of kings" and inculcating the native masses with a resigned fatalism about their social status and economic prospects. In 1824 Francia banned all religious orders, closed the only seminary, "secularized" monks and priests by forcing them to swear loyalty to the state, abolished the fuero eclesiástico (the privilege of clerical immunity from civil courts), confiscated Church property, and subordinated its finances to state control.

The common people benefited from the suppression of the traditional elites and from the expansion of the state. Francia took land from the elite and the church and leased it to the poor. About 875 families received homesteads from the lands of the former seminary. The various fines and confiscations levied on the elites helped to reduce taxes for everyone else.

The expansion of state landholding also increased the government's presence in the countryside. Officials known as "alcabaleros" collected annual rents throughout the territory, while state-run shops supplied tools for rural labor. These measures were reinforced by greater control over movementes and the borders, which further extended state authority. The state quickly became the nation's largest landowner, eventually operating fifty animal-breeding farms.

Francia's attacks on the elite and his expansion of state capacity provoked little popular resistance. He left the state treasury with at least twice as much money in it as when he took office, including 36,500 pesos of his unspent salary, the equivalent of several years' wages. His greatest accomplishment — the preservation of Paraguayan independence — was a result of his non-interventionist foreign policy. Regarding Argentina as a greater threat to Paraguay, he shifted his foreign policy toward Brazil, preserving commerce through a land-based route with that country; this relationship with Brazil would eventually turn into an alliance between the two countries before and during the Platine War against Argentina.

=== Carlos Antonio López ===
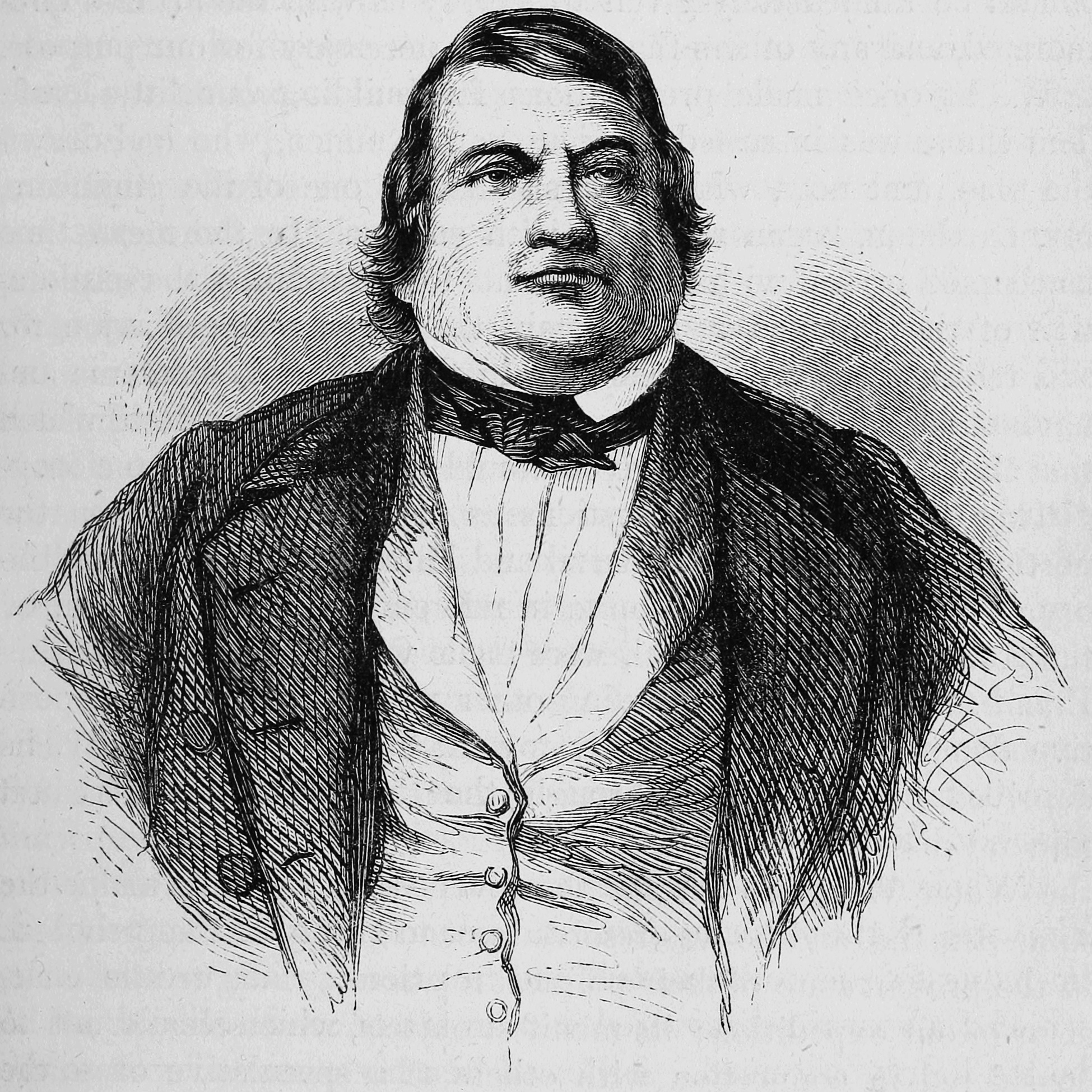
Carlos Antonio López

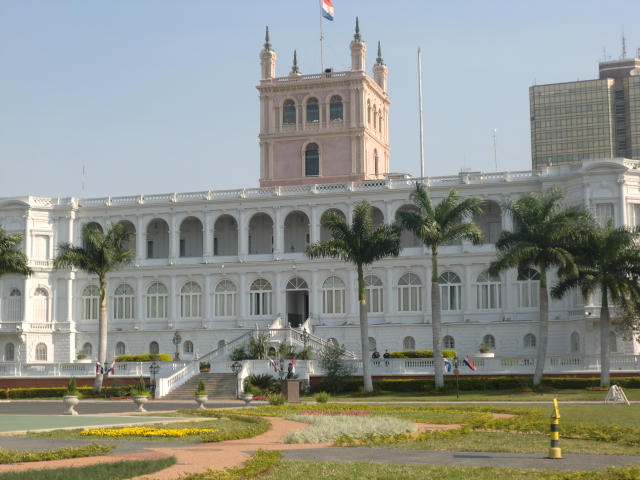
Palace of the López, now the Palace of the President

Confusion ensued after Francia's death on 20 September 1840 because he had left no successor. Eventually, on 9 February 1841, a coup led by military officer Mariano Roque Alonso prevailed. On 14 March 1841, the Fifth National Congress re-established the two-man consulate of the early independent era, appointing Alonso and Carlos Antonio López as joint consuls for a three-year term. This Second Consulate lasted until 13 March 1844, when Congress named López the president of the Republic.

López, like Francia, worked towards strengthening Paraguay's independence; Francia had, however, pictured himself as the first citizen of a revolutionary state, whereas López was a despot who treated Paraguay like a personal fiefdom, using the state to enrich himself and his family, and who founded a dynasty. The López soon became the largest landowners in the country, amassing a fortune, augmented with the profits from the state monopoly on the yerba maté trade, the country's main export product.

Despite this, Paraguay prospered under El Excelentísimo (the Most Excellent One), as López was known: the population increased from about 220,000 in 1840 to about 400,000 in 1860. During his time in office, López strengthened national defense, abolished the remnants of the reductions, stimulated economic development, and improved relations with foreign countries.

When López took office, Asunción had only one primary school. During his tenure, more than 400 schools were built for 25,000 primary students, and the state re-instituted secondary education. López's educational development plans progressed with difficulty, because Francia had purged the country of the educated elite, which included teachers. López loosened restrictions on foreign relations, boosted exports, invited foreign physicians, engineers, and investors to settle in Paraguay, and paid for students to study abroad. In 1853 he sent his son Francisco Solano to Europe to hire personnel and buy machinery for an ironworks. López was worried about the possibility of a war with Brazil or Argentina, so he built an army of 12,945 soldiers with a reserve of 60,328, a force larger than that of Paraguay's much larger neighbors.

Several highways and a telegraph linking Asunción with the massive Fortress of Humaitá were built. A British firm began building a railroad from Asunción to Paraguarí, in one of the earliest such ventures in South America, in 1858. On 22 September 1861, a railway station was opened in Asunción. Foreign experts helped build a foundry at Ybycuí and a large armory.

Slavery had existed in Paraguay since the early colonial days. Settlers had brought slaves to work as domestic servants, but their number was limited. Conditions worsened after 1700, however, with the importation of about 50,000 African slaves to be used as agricultural workers. Under Francia, the state acquired about 1,000 slaves when it confiscated property from the elite. López enacted a freedom of wombs law in 1842, which ended the slave trade and guaranteed that the children of slaves would be free at age twenty-five. After the Paraguayan War, the 1870 Constitution would end slavery completely.

==== Foreign relations ====
Despite being de facto independent since 1811 and having proclaimed a Republic in 1813, Paraguay formally declared independence only on 25 November 1842, and adopted a new constitution, reflecting its new status, in 1844. Afterwards the country started to gain official international recognition, despite López retaining the previous administration's mistrust of the surrounding states; the Paraguayan leader feared the most an attack by the Buenos Aires dictator Rosas. With Brazilian encouragement, López dropped Francia's policy of neutrality and began meddling in Argentine politics. López declared war against Rosas in 1845 to support what was ultimately an unsuccessful offensive against Buenos Aires by troops from Corrientes.

After Rosas was ousted in 1852, López signed a treaty with Buenos Aires that recognized Paraguay's independence. In the same year, López signed treaties of friendship, commerce, and navigation with France and the United States, and in the years after, managed to receive the recognition of Paraguayan independence from most of Europe.

=== Francisco Solano López ===
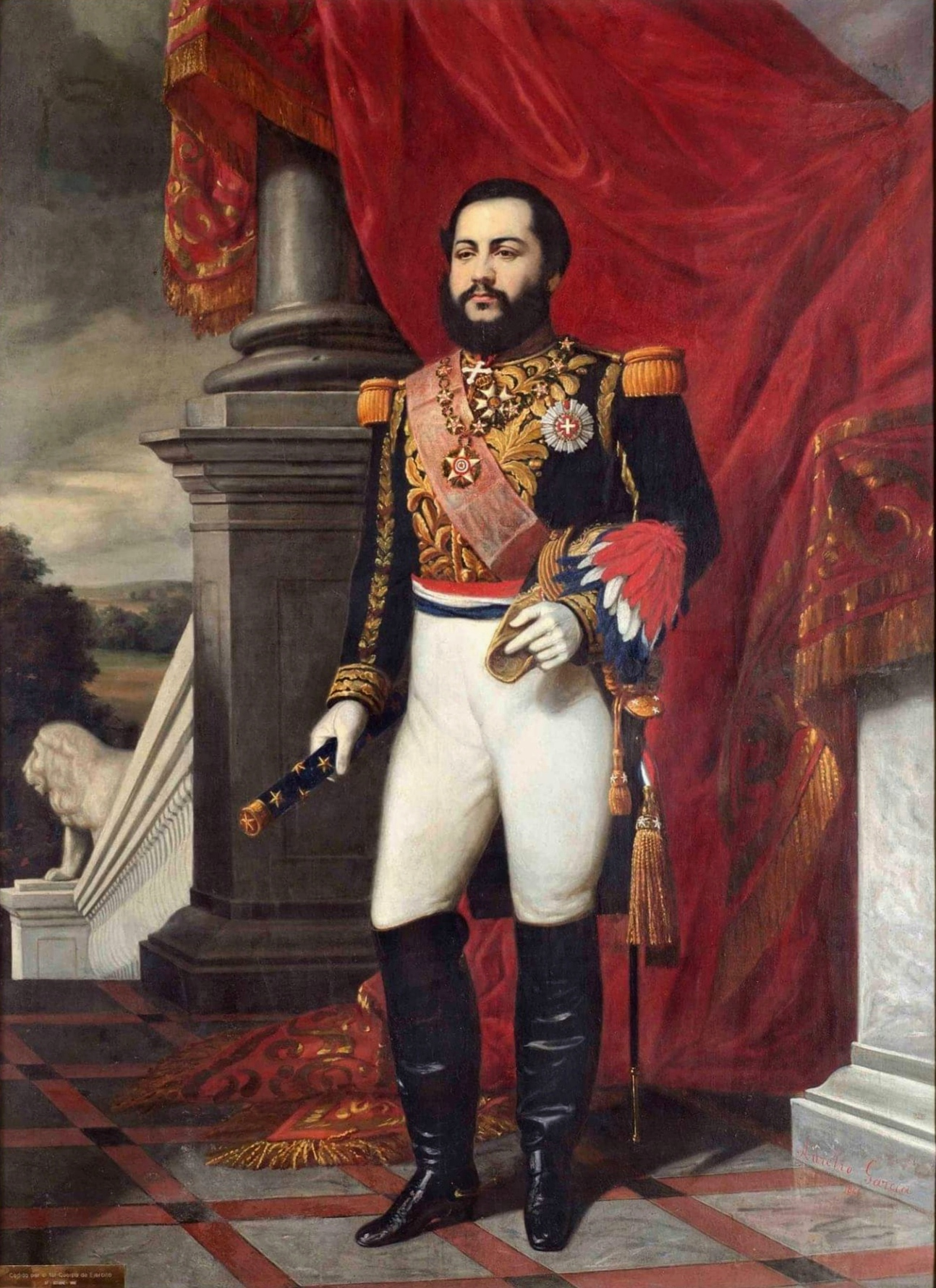
López as a military leader, 1866

Francisco Solano López became the second and final ruler of the López dynasty. After his father's death on 10 September 1862, the Paraguayan Congress elected him president on 16 October 1862. Solano López solidified his power by imprisoning his critics.

The export of yerba mate and tobacco maintained the balance of trade between Paraguay and the outside world. The Paraguayan government was mercantilistic, never accepted loans from abroad, and employed high tariffs to forestall imports. This mercantilism maintained the nation's self-sufficiency, which hailed from the Francia period. The trade surplus also allowed for the accumulation of hard currency, which was used to purchase weaponry and machinery from Europe.

Solano López is a controversial historical figure. George Thompson, an English engineer who worked for him, called him "a monster without parallel". The dictator's conduct provoked these charges: his ambitions led Paraguay to war with Argentina, Brazil, and Uruguay simultaneously, a war which led to the loss of roughly half of the country's population and almost meant the end of its existence as an independent nation. During the war, Solano López ordered the executions of his own brothers and had his mother and sisters tortured when he suspected them of opposing him. Thousands of others also went to their deaths before firing squads or were hacked to pieces on his orders, including most foreigners who then lived in the country.

== Paraguayan War ==
Territorial disputes between Paraguay and its neighbors, 1864

Solano López assessed the Brazilian intervention in Uruguay in 1864 as a threat not only to Uruguay but also to Paraguay. Believing that preserving Uruguayan independence was crucial to maintaining the balance of power in the region, he committed Paraguay to the aid of Uruguay. Despite López’ warning against intervening in Uruguay's internal conflict, Brazil invaded Uruguay in October 1864. On 12 November 1864, López ordered the seizure of a Brazilian ship in Paraguayan territorial waters. He followed this in December of the same year by ordering an invasion of Mato Grosso in Brazil, which bordered Paraguay to the north.

When Argentina refused Solano López's request for permission for his army to cross Argentine territory to attack the Brazilian province of Rio Grande do Sul, on the way to Uruguay, Solano López declared war against Argentina. This created the conditions for Argentina, Brazil, and Uruguay to sign the Treaty of the Triple Alliance in May 1865. Under the treaty, these nations vowed to end the López government, and settle their territorial claims with Paraguay. The war, afterwards, can be divided into four campaigns: the Corrientes campaign, lasting 8 months between Paraguay's invasion of Argentina and Brazil and its withdrawal; the Humaitá campaign, centered around Paraguay's defense of the crucial Fortress of Humaitá which controlled the river approach to Asunción, took 2 years and 3 months; the Pikysyry campaign, which took 4 months and in which Paraguay's regular army was destroyed and Asunción taken, and, finally, the Cordilleras campaign, which took 9 months and brought about the war's end, as Solano López was killed then.

Paraguay was not prepared for post-American Civil War warfare. Its army lacked a structured officer corps and adequate reserves, there was no industrial base with which to properly replace weapons and ammunition, and the Allied fluvial supremacy prevented Paraguay from being resupplied from abroad. Paraguay's population of about 450,000 was dwarfed by the Allied population of circa 11 million. Even after a very broad conscription effort, and with women performing almost all nonmilitary labor, López was unable to field an army as large as those of his adversaries.

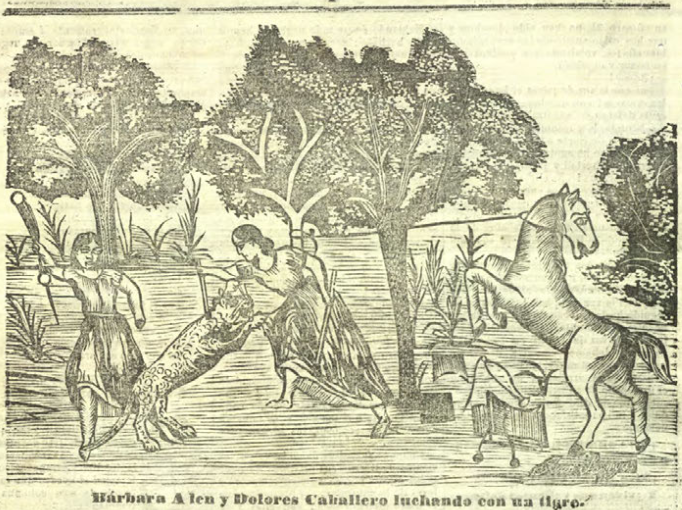
Drawing from a Paraguayan trench newspaper showing two Paraguayan women fighting a jaguar alone during the war.

Despite some victories on Mato Grosso and on the defense of Humaitá, the war was disastrous for Paraguay. Paraguayan army units arrived in the Argentine province of Corrientes in April 1865. By July, more than half of Paraguay's 30,000-man invasion force had been killed or captured. By 1867, Paraguay had lost 60,000 men to casualties, disease, or capture, and another 60,000 people – slaves and children – were called to duty.

As the Paraguayan fortunes wound down, López organized a wave of torture and executions against supposed conspirators to his rule, including most foreigners still in the country and his brothers. Many victims were stabbed to death in order to save ammunition, their bodies dumped in mass graves.

By the end of 1868, as the Pikysyry campaign approached its end, the Paraguayan army had shrunk to a few thousand soldiers, many of them too young or old. Cavalry units operated on foot for the lack of horses, and infantry went out on canoes to try to take over ironclads. On 30 December, the Paraguayan Army was defeated at the Battle of Angostura and the Allies entered Asunción. Solano López held out in the sparsely populated north of the country for another fourteen months, while the Paraguayan population endured another massacre under Solano López's orders, as well as more humiliating losses on the battlefield (e.g., the Battle of Piribebuy and the Battle of Acosta Ñu).

Solano López's death on 1 March 1870 at the Battle of Cerro Corá marked the end of the Paraguayan War. Hundreds of thousands of Paraguayans had died. Paraguay endured a lengthy occupation by foreign troops which ended only in 1876 and nearly all territorial disputes with Argentina and Brazil were settled to its disfavour.

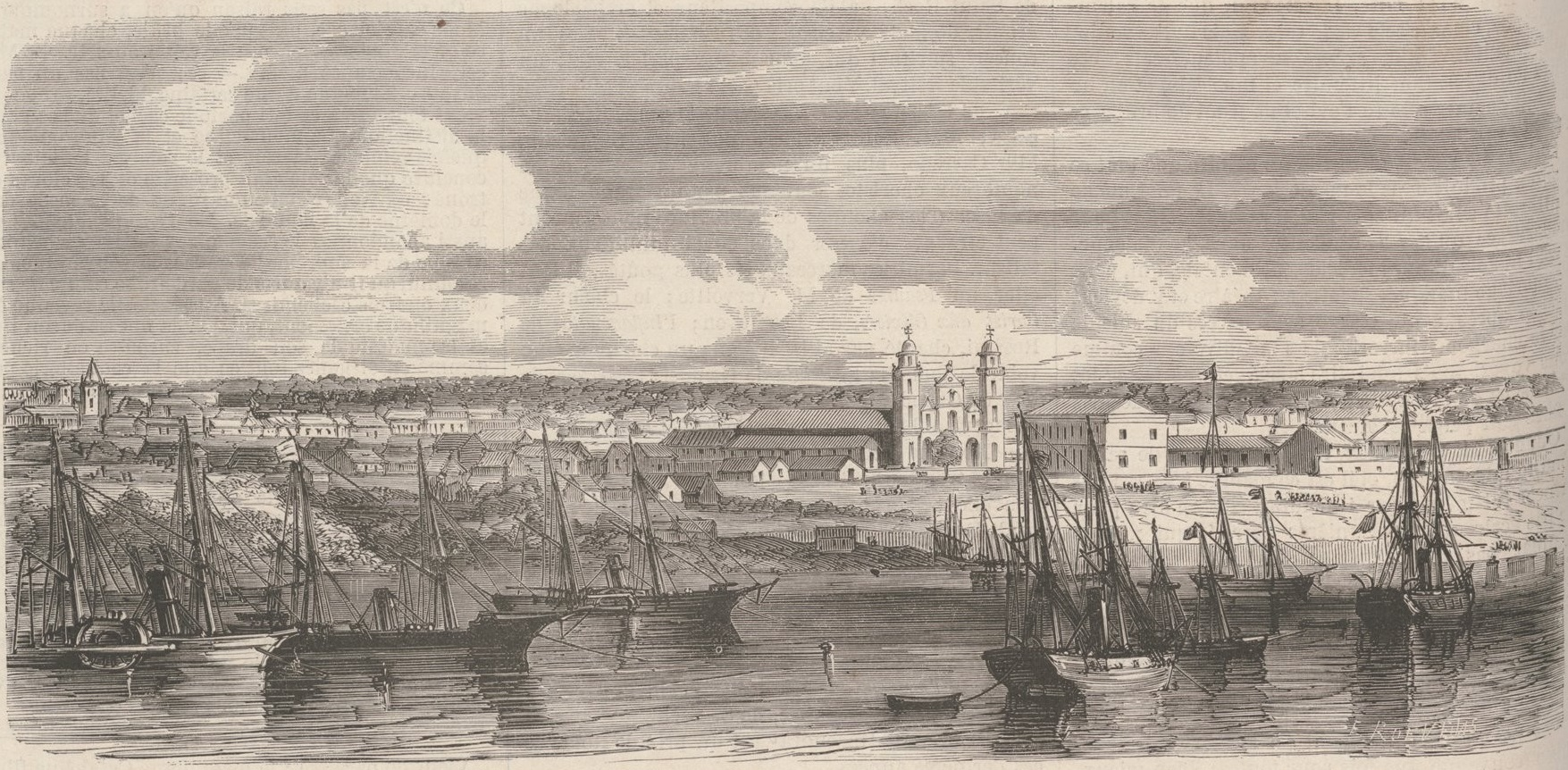
Allied warships in the port of Asunción, 1869

== The postwar era ==
=== Demographics and society ===
The demographic impacts of the war have been a point of contention for a long time. Whigham and Potthast, in a paper from 1999, estimate the country to have lost around 60 to 69% of its population, while Vera Blinn Reber estimates a loss of less than 18%. Also notable is that in the data collected by Whigham and Potthast for the year of 1870, when the war ended, there were more than two women left for every man, and most of the males left were categorized as children. Herken-Krauer estimates that the country's population, in 1872, was between 100,000 and 250,000 people, while the commonly accepted estimates for the country's pre-war population are of 400,000 to 450,000 people. By 1886, a census estimated the country's population at 329,645 people, so that the earlier estimates for population in the early 1870s are probably to the low side, given the absence of immirgration and the aforementioned gender disbalance.

Nevertheless, there is a consensus that the war caused a gender imbalance in Paraguay. Barbara Potthast credits to Paraguayan women the reconstruction of a completely devastated country; she also attributes the relative independence of women in the country as an achievement from this era. This process, which eventually led to the historical Paraguayan woman being construed into a heroine, failed to give them political rights and participation, however. They would only achieve the right to vote in 1961, with Paraguay being the last country to adopt women's suffrage in Latin America.

Greater female participation in the economy and culture after the war is undeniable, conversely. Paraguay's first private newspaper, La Regeneración, founded in October 1869, had amongst its contributors a woman, Asunción Escalada, something unknown in the pre-war Paraguayan media, announcing a different era in terms of the country's arts and social relations. Serafina Dávalos, Paraguay's first female lawyer, would, in the early 20th century, thoroughly debate established Paraguayan intellectuals, such as Manuel Domínguez and Fulgencio Moreno, regarding what should be the role of the Paraguayan woman in society. Eventually, the need for universal education, including for women, was defended as a necessity by the new media of the postwar era.

=== Political conflicts ===
In 1869, when the Allies took Asunción, the country lacked a government. Pedro II of Brazil sent his foreign minister José Paranhos there, where he arrived on 20 February 1869; he soon began consultations with the local elite. On 31 March a petition was signed by 335 leading citizens asking the Allies for a provisional government. This was followed by negotiations between the Allied countries, who put aside some of more controversial points of the Treaty of the Triple Alliance, and on 11 June an agreement was reached with Paraguayan opposition figures that a three-man provisional government would be established. On 22 July a National Assembly met in the National Theatre and elected a Junta Nacional of 21 men, which then selected a five-man committee to select three men for the provisional government. They selected Carlos Loizaga, Juan Francisco Decoud, and José Díaz de Bedoya. Decoud was unacceptable to Paranhos for his sons' pro-Argentine stance, and he was replaced with Cirilo Antonio Rivarola. The government was finally installed on 15 August under the continued Allied occupation, consisting of Colonel Carlos Loizaga as President of the Council, Sergeant Cirilo Antonio Rivarola as Secretary of the Interior, and José Díaz de Bedoya as Secretary of the Treasury.

After Cerro Corá, where Solano López died, the provisional government issued a proclamation in which it promised to support political liberties, to protect commerce and to promote immigration, but it did not last. In May 1870 José Díaz de Bedoya resigned and on 31 August 1870, Carlos Loizaga also did so. Cirilo Rivarola continued as sole president until the 1870 Constitution was ratified and remained president afterwards primarily due to Brazilian influence. The 1870 Constitution was modeled after the Constitution of the United States, and its main author was José Segundo Decoud, son to Juan Francisco and a former legionnaire (a member of the Paraguayan Legion, a political organization made by exiles of the López regime in Buenos Aires, who fought against his rule during the Triple Alliance War).

After Cirilo Rivarola resigned from the presidency in December 1871, Salvador Jovellanos came to power, backed by General Benigno Ferreira. After facing repeated revolts form López loyalists in 1873 and 1874, first Ferreira and then Jovellanos fled into exile. The next president, Juan Bautista Gill, was assassinated in 1877. The politics of the first post-war decade were heavily influenced by personal conflicts between former López loyalists and their more liberal opponents (centered around members of the Paraguayan Legion), but just as important was the backing of various politicians by Argentina and Brazil. The evacuation of foreign forces in 1876 did not mean the end of foreign influence. Both Brazil and Argentina remained deeply involved in Paraguay and would routinely support political forces loyal to them; Gill's assassination can be traced to the end of his Brazilian support.

In 1880, President Cándido Bareiro died from a stroke. At this point General Bernardino Caballero, the foremost amongst the surviving Paraguayan commanders of the war, assumed the presidency in a coup and laid the foundations of the two-party system, remaining one of the country's most influential politicians until the 1904 Liberal revolution. The political rivalry between future Liberals and Colorados had already started in 1869, before the war was over, when the terms Azules (Blues) and Colorados (Reds) first appeared, though they were only officially established as parties in 1887. Both parties had former López supporters and Paraguayan Legion veterans in their ranks. The Colorado Party dominated Paraguayan political life from the mid-1870s until 1904, when Liberals took over in a coup. This ascent of Liberal Party marked the decline of Brazilian influence, which had supported the Colorados as the principal political force in Paraguay, and the corresponding rise of Argentine influence.

The Colorados had dismantled the pre-war economic system. Desperate for cash because of heavy debts incurred in London in the early postwar period, they lacked a source of funds except through the sale of the state's vast holdings, which comprised more than 80% of Paraguay's total land. Caballero's government sold much of this land to foreigners in huge lots. While Colorado politicians raked in the profits and themselves became large landowners, peasant squatters who had farmed the land for generations were forced to vacate and, in many cases, to emigrate. The first three decades of the post-Triple Alliance War period had shown that the 1870 Constitution, though democratic, had failed to make Paraguay into a working democracy. There were no contested presidential elections, electoral violence was rife, and popular participation in all spheres of politics was limited.

=== Liberal era, 1904–36 ===
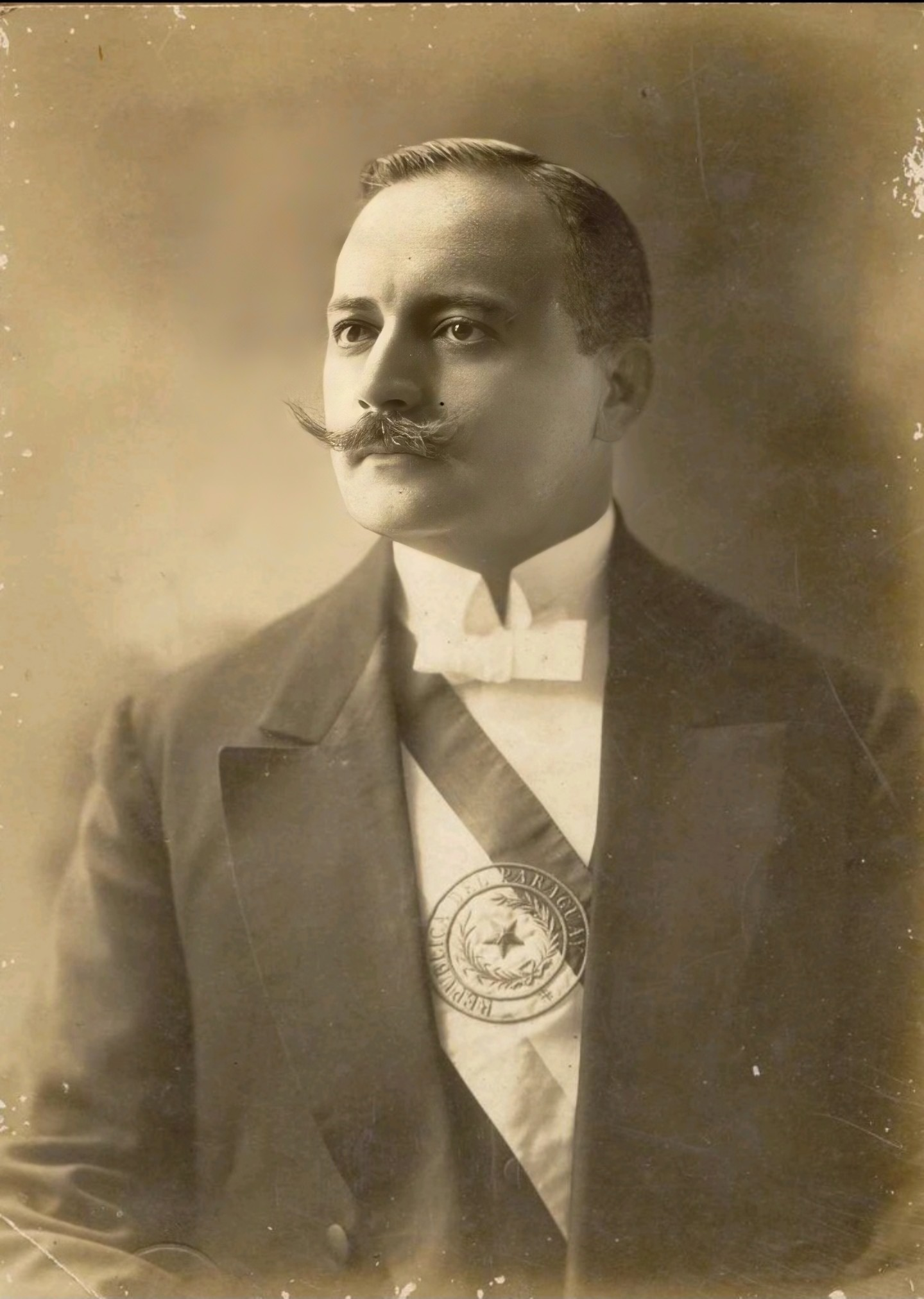
Eduardo Schaerer

The Liberal Revolution of August 1904 began as a popular movement, but Liberal rule quickly degenerated into anarchy. The Liberal era, over its 36 years, would see 21 different governments and two civil wars. Laissez-faire Liberal policies had permitted a handful of hacendados to exercise almost feudal control over the countryside and to, through lobbying, control Paraguayan politics and economic policy. Meanwhile, the peasantry had little land and was subject to harsh work conditions in the yerba fields.

On 25 November 1906 Benigno Ferreira was elected to the presidency. The Liberals had disbanded the army when they came to power and organized a completely new one. Much of its equipment had been lost during the course of the 1904 Revolution. Nevertheless, by 1910 army commander Colonel Albino Jara felt strong enough to stage a coup against civilian president Manuel Gondra. Jara's coup was the opening act for an anarchic two-year period, in which every major political group seized power at least once, and in which a civil war took place. The radicales, a branch of the Liberal Party, invaded from Argentina, and when the charismatic Eduardo Schaerer became president, Gondra returned as Minister of War to reorganize the army once more. Schaerer became the first president since Egusquiza to finish his four-year term.

The new political calm was shattered, however, when the radicales split into Schaerer and Gondra factions. Gondra won the presidential election in 1920, but the schaereristas undermined his power and forced him to resign. Another full-scale civil war between the factions broke out in May 1922 and lasted fourteen months. The Gondra faction won and held on to power until 1936. The Great Depression would worsen economic conditions, but the Chaco War (1932-35) and the nationalistic fervors that accompanied it would allow them to stay in power for a few more years.

== Chaco War ==
A dispute with Bolivia over the Chaco, brewing for decades, would erupt in the 1930s. Wars and poor diplomacy had prevented the settling of boundaries between the two countries. Although Paraguay de facto held the Chaco, the country did little to develop the area. Aside from scattered Mennonite colonies, nomadic tribes, and some firms dedicated to quebracho exploitation, few people lived there. Bolivia's claim to the Chaco gathered more force after it lost its sea coast to Chile during the War of the Pacific in the late 19th century. Bolivia wanted to absorb the Chaco and expand its territory up to the Paraguay river in order to gain a river port. In addition, oil had been discovered in the Bolivian Chaco by Standard Oil in the 1920s, and people wondered whether there was oil lying beneath the entire area.

While Paraguayans were busy fighting among themselves during the 1920s, Bolivians established a series of forts in the Paraguayan Chaco. In addition, they bought armaments from Germany and hired German military officers to train and lead their forces. Frustration in Paraguay with Liberal inaction boiled over in 1928 when the Bolivian army established a fort on the Paraguay River called Fortín Vanguardia. In December of that year, Paraguayan Major Rafael Franco led a surprise attack on the fort, and succeeded in destroying it. The routed Bolivians responded quickly by seizing two Paraguayan forts. Both sides mobilized, but the Liberal government felt unprepared for war, so it agreed to the humiliating condition of rebuilding Fortín Vanguardia for the Bolivians. The Liberal government also provoked criticism when it forced Franco, by then a national hero, to retire from the army. As diplomats from Argentina, the United States, and the League of Nations conducted fruitless peace talks, Colonel José Félix Estigarribia, Paraguay's deputy army commander, ordered his troops into action against Bolivian positions early in 1931, aiming to secure an advantageous position before the Bolivian general mobilization could take place and their superior numbers came into full effect.

Chaco war map

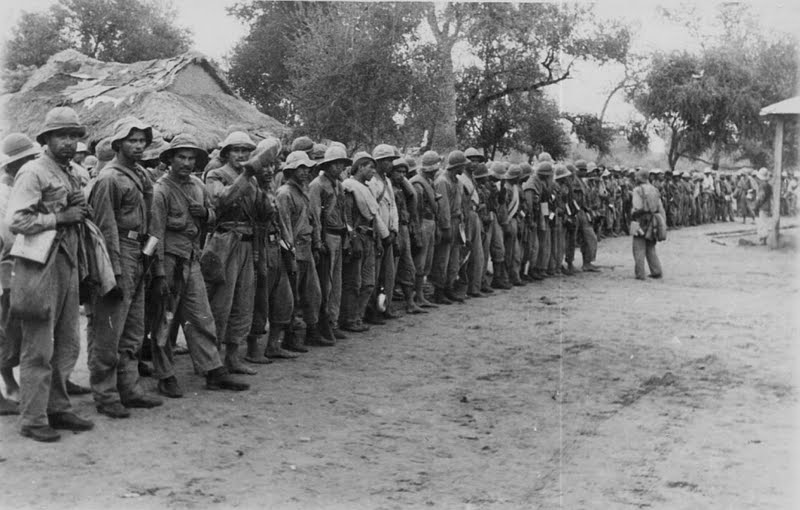
Paraguayan soldiers in the Chaco

By July 1932, when war was formally declared, the Bolivians were confident of rapid victory. Theirs was a wealthier and larger country, able to spend much more money than Paraguay in purchasing weapons, aircraft, and tanks. The Chaco question had been the primary issue in Paraguayan political discourse, however. The average Paraguayan soldier was highly motivated, and better able to deal with the Chaco's harsh climate than the average Bolivian, who mostly came from the cold Altiplano. They easily infiltrated Bolivian lines, surrounded outposts, keeping them from water, and captured precious supplies. Long supply lines and overall weak logistics, further hampered by Paraguayan disruption, impeded any major Bolivian advances. The Paraguayans proved more politically cohesive than the Bolivians, as President Eusebio Ayala and Colonel Estigarribia worked well together, and Bolivian president Daniel Salamanca, meanwhile, was toppled by his country's military in 1934.

After the Paraguayan victory at Campo Vía in July 1933, Bolivia seemed on the verge of surrender, and requested a truce, which President Ayala agreed to. This was, however, a ruse; Bolivia used the time bought by the truce to regroup its disorganized forces and set up a new defensive line. The war would end only July 1935. Although the Liberals had led the country into victory, they had exhausted their political capital in doing so. In many ways, the Chaco War acted as a catalyst to unite the political opposition with workers and peasants, allowing for a social revolution. The government offended the enlisted soldiers by refusing to fund pensions for disabled veterans in 1936 while awarding a pension of 1,500 gold pesos a year to Estigarribia. Colonel Franco became the leader of the nationalists inside and outside the army. The final spark to rebellion came when Franco was exiled for openly criticizing Ayala. On 17 February 1936, units of the army from a garrison near Asunción marched to the capital and forced the president to resign, ending thirty-two years of Liberal rule.

== Military dictatorships ==
=== February Revolution ===
During its 18 months of existence, the Febrerista government, led by war hero Franco, showed that it was serious about social justice by expropriating more than 200,000 hectares of land and distributing it to 10,000 peasant families. In addition, the new government guaranteed workers the right to strike and established an eight-hour work day. The reforms ended up being somewhat restricted in scope, however; the new government did not have enough power to exporpriate land owned by foreigners (since the 1880s, mostly Argentines). Though one of the febreristas's parties in the government, the Revolutionary National Union (Unión Nacional Revolucionaria) called for representative democracy, rights for peasants and workers, and socialization of key industries, it failed to broaden Franco's political base.

The remaining Liberals in country constantly agitated with the Army for it to overthrow the revolutionaries. When their government ordered its troops to abandon the advanced line held in the Chaco since the truce in 1935 in mid-1937, the army rose up and returned the Liberals to power.

Even after this there were, still, nationalist and fascist elements in the army dissatisfied with the Liberals. Several attempted coups served to remind the newly-installed President Félix Paiva (the former dean of law at the National University) that some of the ideals of the February Revolution still remained. The peace treaty signed with Bolivia on 21 July 1938 further aroused the opposition's passions when it fixed the postwar border in a way that lost Paraguay territory that had been under its control by the war's end.

=== Estigarribia ===
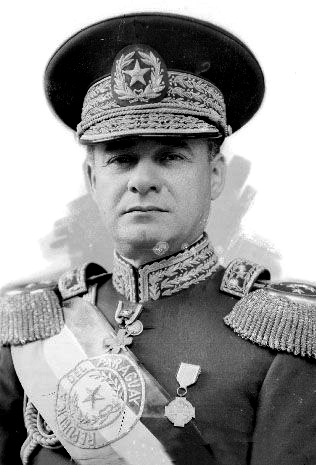
José Félix Estigarribia

In 1939 the Liberal politicians, recognizing that they had to choose someone popular with the various powerful groups in the country to be president if they wanted to keep power, picked General José Félix Estigarribia as their candidate on 19 March 1939. The commander of the Army during victory in the Chaco conflict was serving as an envoy to the United States, and on 13 June Estigarribia and US Secretary of State Cordell Hull signed the Export-Import Bank loan of US$3.5 million. This greatly increased US influence in the country. On 15 August 1939, he assumed the presidency and soon realized that he would not be able to revert all changes made during the period of the February Revolution if he was to avoid political anarchy. He began a program of land reform that promised a small plot of land to every Paraguayan family. He reopened the university, implemented monetary and municipal reforms, balanced the budget, financed the public debt and drew up plans to build highways and public works with the loan from the United States.

Estigarribia faced sharp criticism from the conservative Catholic intellectuals and their newspaper El Tiempo as well as leftist febrerista student activists in the university. After anti-government demonstrations broke out in Asunción, the army suppressed them and arrested Catholic and febrerista leaders. This led to a withdrawal of Colorado support for Estigarribia, and an attempted coup on 14 February 1940 broke out in Campo Grande military base.

On the same day Estigarribia proposed to establish a temporary dictatorship. This proposal split the Liberal party leadership, many of whom supported this idea, and on 18 February 1940 he established a temporary dictatorship, dismissing the 1870 Constitution and promising a new Constitution.

On 10 July the project of the new Constitution was published and on 4 August 1940, approved in a referendum. The new Constitution was based on the authoritarian 1937 Constitution of Brazil's Estado Novo and established a corporativist state, dismissing the need for elections and greatly expanding the power of the executive branch. The Constitution of 1940 promised a "strong, but not despotic" President and a new state empowered to deal directly with social and economic problems. It greatly increased the powers of the Presidency, eliminated the vice-presidency, created a unicameral parliament, and increased the state's power over individual and property rights. It also gave the military the duty to protect the Constitution, thus giving it a role in politics.

=== Morínigo ===
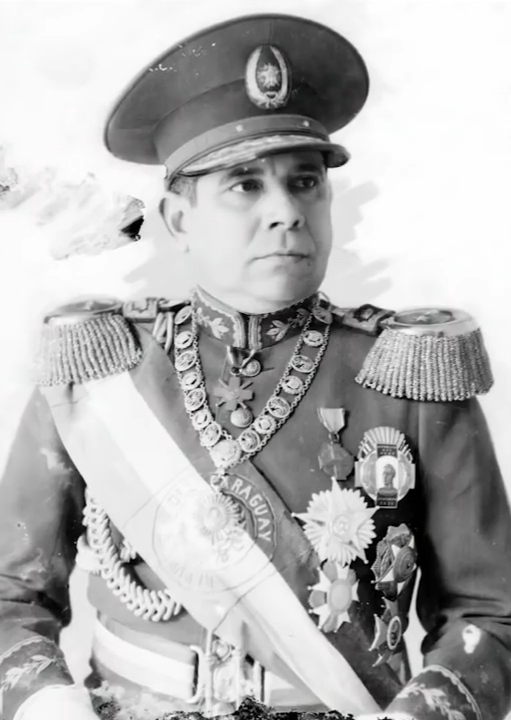
Higinio Morínigo

The era of Estigarribia's New Liberals came to a sudden end on 7 September 1940, when the President and his wife died in an airplane crash. The military, ignoring both Liberal factions, chose the Minister of the Army, General Higinio Morínigo, as president.

Having inherited Estigarribia's near-dictatorial powers provided by the new 1940 Constitution, Morínigo quickly exiled leading Febreristas and Liberals and clamped down drastically on free speech and individual liberties.

Paraguayan (symbolic) participation on the Allied side in World War II, and overall Allied victory, convinced Morínigo to liberalize his regime in 1946. Paraguay experienced a brief period of openness as he relaxed restrictions on free speech, allowed political exiles to return, and formed a coalition government with Liberals and febreristas. Morínigo's intentions about stepping down were unclear, however, and he maintained a de facto alliance with Colorado Party hardliners and their right-wing Guión Rojo (Red Banner) paramilitary group led by Juan Natalicio Gonzalez, which antagonized and terrorized the opposition. This led to a failed coup in December 1946 and full-scale civil war by March 1947. Led by Rafael Franco, who had been in exile, the revolutionaries were an unlikely coalition of febreristas, Liberals and Communists, thrown together in their will to topple Morínigo.

The Colorados helped Morínigo crush the insurgency, with the crucial aid of the General Brúgez Artillery Regiment and its commander, Lieutenant Colonel Alfredo Stroessner. When a revolt at the Asunción Navy Yard put a strategic working-class neighborhood in rebel hands, Stroessner's regiment soon destroyed the area. When rebel ships threatened to dash upriver from Argentina to bombard Asunción into submission, Stroessner's forces fought and damaged them before they could.

By the end of the rebellion in August 1948 the Colorado Party had almost total control in Paraguay. The fighting had simplified politics by eliminating all other parties and by reducing the size of the army. With Morínigo's backing, González used his Guión Rojo forces to intimidate those favourable to democracy, and gain his party's presidential nomination. He ran unopposed in the long-promised 1948 elections. Suspecting that Morínigo would not relinquish power, a group of Colorado military officers, including Stroessner, removed Morínigo from office on 3 June 1948. In September 1949, after a short term and two provisional presidents, González himself had been exiled and Federico Chaves, leader of the Colorado wing opposite to him, had assumed the presidency.

=== Stroessner ===
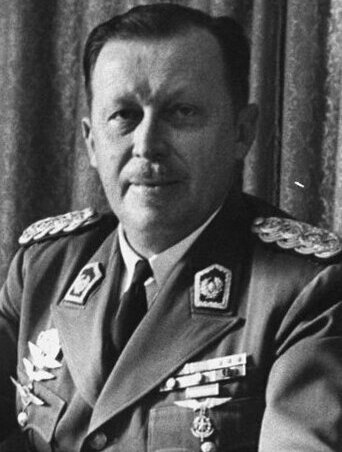
Alfredo Stroessner

As one of the few officers who had remained loyal to Morínigo during the civil war, Alfredo Stroessner became a formidable player after the conflict, given that most of the country's officer corps had defected to the rebels during the conflict. On 4 May 1954, Stroessner enacted a coup d'état against then-President Chaves. Fierce resistance by the police left around fifty dead.

After taking power Stroessner built a harshly repressive government over time, designed to keep all possible opposing forces from politics, including Liberals, Febreristas, and, crucially, the country's few communists. Beyond the financial and technical support he received from the United States – which supported his anti-communist struggle, given the context of the Cold War – Stroessner's dictatorship was characterized by corruption and the distribution of favors among what was known as "the trilogy": the government, the Colorado Party and the armed forces. Smuggling – geographically favoured by Paraguay's location between Brazil, Argentina and Bolivia – became one of the main sources of income, from alcohol and drugs to cars and exotic animals. Some estimate that the volume of smuggling was three times the official export figure, and Stroessner used some of that money, as well as slices of major infrastructure works and the delivery of land, to buy the loyalty of his officers, many of whom amassed huge fortunes and large estates. Most Latin American dictatorships of the era regularly instituted extrajudicial killings of their enemies; Paraguay, which participated in Operation Condor, was no different. Elections were kept in order to maintain a facade of democracy, with Stroessner winning more than 70% of the vote in every one of the 8 elections that was held. The Liberals split into factions, with the traditional establishment participating in the political process and another wing rejecting it, with said wing being the basis for today's Authentic Radical Liberal Party.

Brazil's financing of the US$19 billion Itaipú Dam on the Paraná River between Paraguay and Brazil had far-reaching consequences for Paraguay; it had no means of contributing financially to the construction, but its cooperation, including controversial concessions regarding ownership of the construction site and the rates for which Paraguay agreed to sell its share of the electricity, was essential. Itaipú gave Paraguay's economy a new source of wealth. Thousands of Paraguayans who had never before held a regular job went to work on the enormous dam. From 1973 (when construction began) until 1982 (when it ended), gross domestic product grew more than 8% annually, double the rate for the previous decade and higher than growth rates in most other Latin American countries. Foreign exchange earnings from electricity sales to Brazil soared, and the newly employed Paraguayan workforce stimulated domestic demand, bringing about a rapid expansion in the agricultural sector.

On 3 February 1989, Stroessner was overthrown in a coup headed by his close associate General Andrés Rodríguez. He went into exile in Brazil, where he died in 2006. At the time of his death, Stroessner was the defendant in several international human rights cases. President Rodríguez instituted political, legal, and economic reforms and initiated a rapprochement with the international community. In the municipal elections of 1991, opposition candidates won several major urban centers, including Asunción.

== Modern Paraguay ==
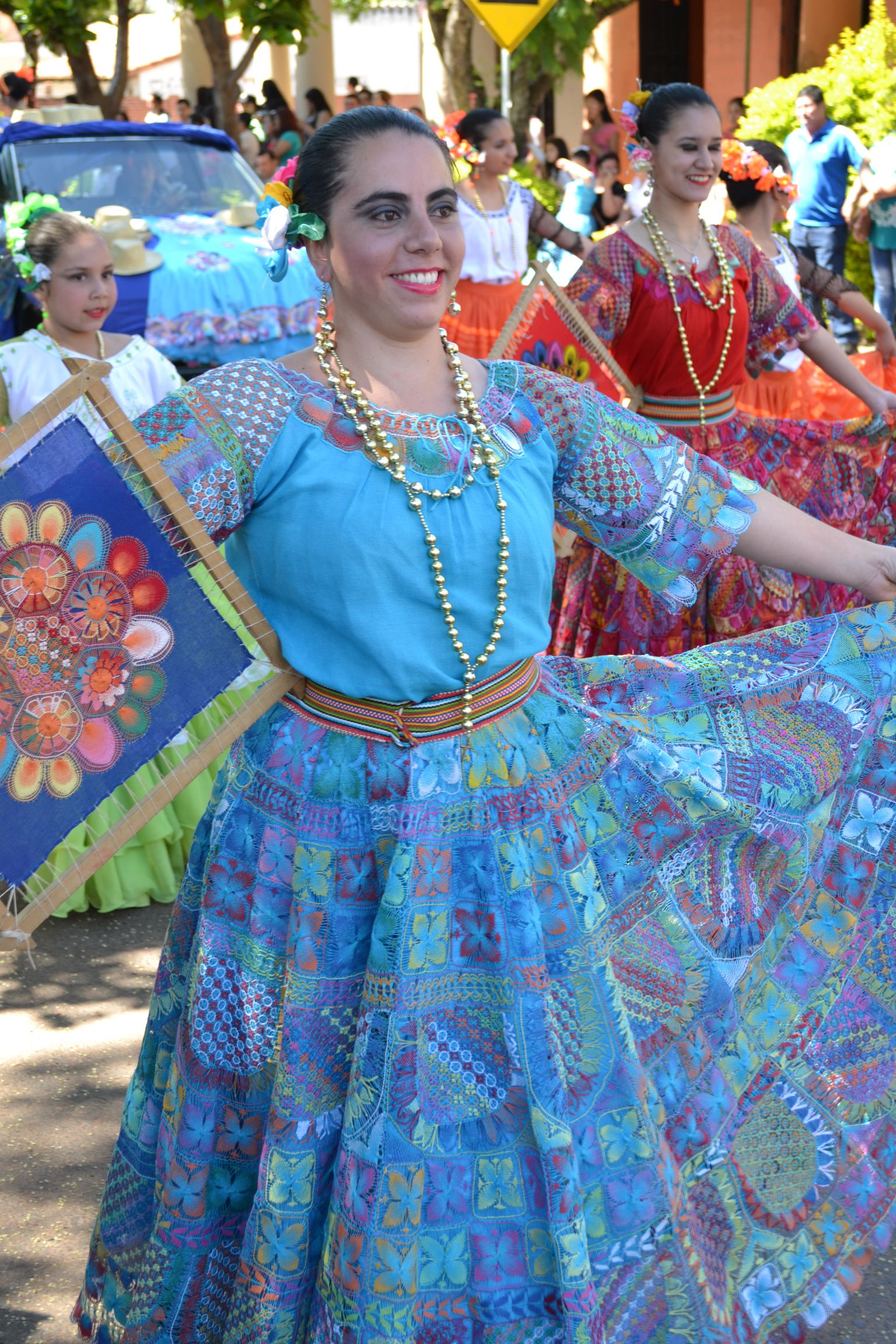
A Paraguayan woman in a parade in the 2010s

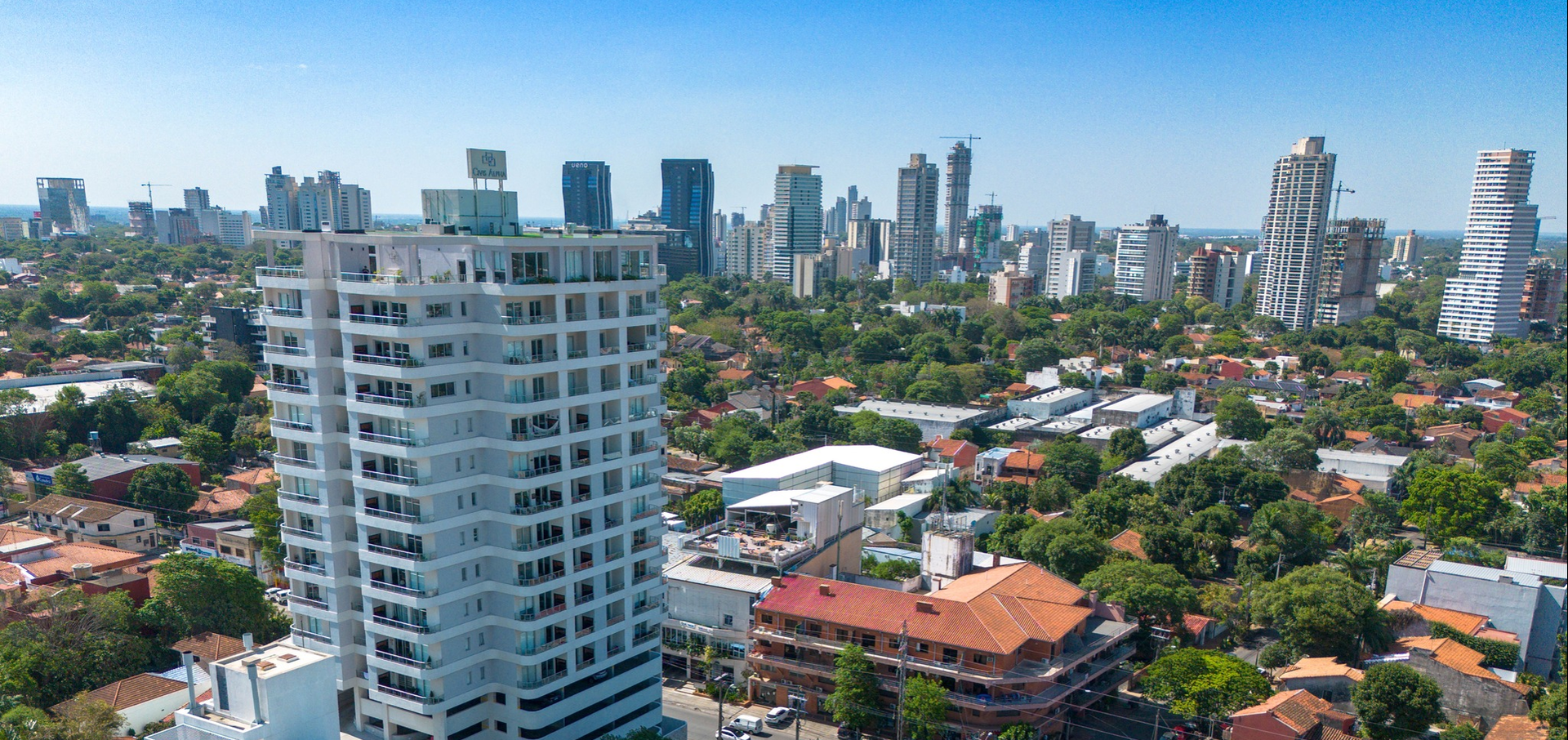
A view of contemporary Asunción

The June 1992 constitution re-established democracy and fundamental rights in a way unseen in Paraguay since the 1940 Constitution had been instituted. In May 1993, Colorado Juan Carlos Wasmosy was elected to the presidency; he was Paraguay's first civilian president in almost 40 years, in what international observers deemed fair and free elections. The newly elected majority-opposition Congress quickly demonstrated its independence from the executive by rescinding legislation passed by the previous Colorado-dominated Congress.

General Lino Oviedo, who in 1996 had attempted a coup, became the Colorado candidate for president in the 1998 election, but when the Supreme Court of Paraguay upheld in April his conviction on charges related to said coup attempt, he was not allowed to run and remained in confinement. His former running mate, Raúl Cubas, became the Colorado Party's candidate and was elected in May. One of Cubas' first acts after taking office in August was to commute Oviedo's sentence and release him from confinement. In December 1998, Paraguay's Supreme Court declared these actions unconstitutional; Cubas defied the court, however, and did not order Oviedo to be arrested again.

In this tense atmosphere, the murder of vice president and long-time Oviedo rival Luis María Argaña on 23 March 1999 made the Chamber of Deputies impeach Cubas the next day. The 26 March murder of eight student anti-government demonstrators, widely believed to have been carried out by Oviedo supporters, made Cubas resign on 28 March. Senate President Luis González Macchi, a Cubas opponent, was sworn in as president that day. Cubas left for Brazil the next day and received asylum. Oviedo fled the same day, first to Argentina, then to Brazil. Macchi, through the remainder of Cubas' term, was accused of corruption several times as he tried to build a coalition government. In 2003, Colorado Nicanor Duarte was elected and sworn in as president.

For the 2008 general elections former Roman Catholic bishop Fernando Lugo, a long time follower of the controversial liberation theology, backed by the Liberal Party was elected. Outgoing President Nicanor Duarte reflected on the defeat and hailed the moment as the first time in the history of his nation that a government handed power to opposition forces in an orderly and peaceful fashion. Lugo was sworn in on 15 August 2008 but later impeached in 2012 and succeeded by Liberal Federico Franco, the vice president.

As a result of the 2013 elections, Colorado Horacio Cartes was elected president. Cartes wanted to amend the constitution to allow for presidential re-elections, but widespread protests and political opposition led him to abandon this goal and he agreed to not seek another term. In August 2018, Colorado Mario Abdo Benítez sworn in as his successor after winning the 2018 presidential election. The 2023 elections resulted in Santiago Peña, also from the Colorado Party, being elected.

In 2026, a banking crisis centered around the government mandated shutdown of Ueno Bank, a mid-sized Paraguayan bank, led to widespread protests and eventually the removal of President Peña from office; Vice President Pedro Alliana assumed the presidency.

== See also ==
- History of the Americas
- History of Latin America
- History of South America
- List of presidents of Paraguay
- Politics of Paraguay
- Spanish colonization of the Americas
