= Gustavo Sosa Escalada =

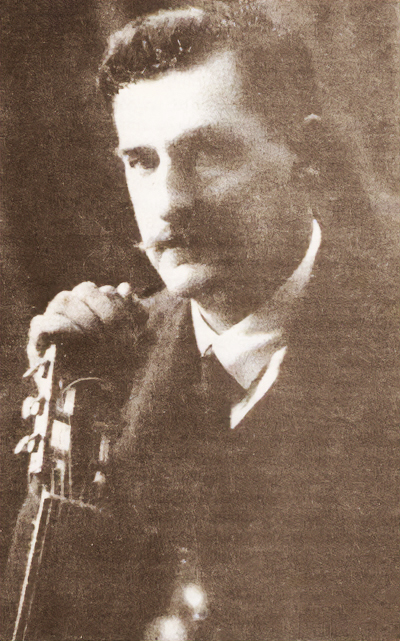

Background information
- Born: Gustavo Adolfo Sosa Escalada; January 16, 1877; Buenos Aires, Argentina
- Died: May 18, 1943 Asunción, Paraguay
- Genres: Classical, Latin American folk
- Occupations: Guitarist, composer, teacher
- Instrument: Guitar
- Years active: 1900s–1943

Gustavo Sosa Escalada (16 January 1877 – 18 May 1943) was a Paraguayan guitarist, composer, music arranger, writer, journalist, and mathematician.

He is widely recognized as the creator of the Paraguayan guitar school and the mentor of notable figures like Agustín Pío Barrios.

== Biography ==
Gustavo Sosa Escalada was born in Buenos Aires, Argentina, to Jaime Sosa Escalada, a Paraguayan political figure exiled in Argentina, and Asunción Escalada, a pioneer in Paraguayan education. He pursued his studies at prestigious Argentine institutions, including the Escuela Naval and the Colegio Nacional de Buenos Aires.

He studied guitar with Juan Alais, Antonio Ferreiro and Carlos García Tolsa. In the 1890s, he moved to Paraguay, where he began teaching guitar at the Paraguayan Institute (now the Ateneo Paraguayo). Over the course of his career, he trained numerous Paraguayan artists, including Quirino Báez Allende, Enriqueta González, and Dionisio Basualdo.

In addition to his musical endeavors, Sosa Escalada worked as a journalist and taught mathematics at schools in Asunción. As a journalist, he wrote for the newspapers La Opinión, La Nación, El Liberal, El Cívico, El Diario, El Orden, and El País.

He died in poverty on 18 May 1943.

== Works ==
Among his most prominent compositions are pieces like A la Gloria, Don Dios nos libre, Estudios arpegiados en Fa Mayor, Cielito porteño, Gavota, Zaida Mercedes, and Tofon (a habanera).

He also authored a literary work titled El buque fantasma, which narrates the events of the Paraguayan Revolution of 1904.
