= Gaspar Sagreras =

Spanish-Argentine guitarist, composer and teacher

- Born: 21 October 1838; Palma de Mallorca, Spain
- Died: 14 April 1901 (aged 62); Buenos Aires, Argentina
- Occupations: guitarist, composer, teacher

Gaspar Sagreras (21 October 1838 – 14 April 1901) was a Spanish-born guitarist, composer and teacher who became a naturalized Argentine citizen. He is remembered as one of the leading figures in the spread of the guitar in late‑19th‑century Argentina and as the father of the renowned guitarist and pedagogue Julio Salvador Sagreras.

== Biography ==
Sagreras was born in Palma de Mallorca in 1838. Following his parents’ wishes, he initially began medical studies, while at the same time cultivating a strong interest in music and the guitar. After the family moved to Buenos Aires, he abandoned medicine and completed his musical training, devoting the rest of his life to performance and teaching.

In Buenos Aires he established himself as a notable guitarist, taking part in concerts and musical gatherings within Porteño society. He studied harmony to broaden his skills and formed friendships with fellow guitarists such as Juan Alais Moncada, Carlos García Tolsa and Bernardo Troncoso. With them he performed in a trio formation during 1887 and 1888.

Among his students were Lorenzo Torres, Mariano Castex Sr., and the papal marchioness Adela María Harilao de Olmos. His musical salons were frequently attended by General Julio Argentino Roca, future president of Argentina, together with his daughters, who were also guitarists.

Sagreras died in Buenos Aires on 14 April 1901.

== Legacy ==
Gaspar Sagreras played an important role in establishing the guitar as a concert instrument in Argentina. Although his own output was modest, his work influenced the local guitar tradition and paved the way for the career of his son Julio Salvador, who later brought the Sagreras name international recognition.

== Works ==
Sagreras's surviving compositions are few, but some achieved wide circulation:

- Una lágrima – a short guitar piece considered his best‑known work, published in more than one hundred editions and widely disseminated throughout Latin America.
- No me olvides – a habanera for guitar, published in Buenos Aires by Antigua Casa Nuñez.
- Various arrangements, including transcriptions related to the Himno Nacional Argentino.
