= Aleixo Garcia's expedition to the Inca Empire =

- Map of the Inca Empire
Date	1524–1525
Location	Inca Empire
Result	Victory for Aleixo Garcia and the Guaraní

Belligerents
Few Portuguese (Spain) Few Spaniards; Guaraní	Inca Empire

Commanders and leaders
Aleixo Garcia X: Pacheco	Unknown

Strength
2,000 Guaraní; A few Portuguese and Spaniards	20,000

The Aleixo Garcia's expedition to the Inca Empire (1524–1525) was an expedition led by Aleixo Garcia, with the support of the Guaraní and a few Portuguese and Spaniards, as an attempt to raid the riches of the Inca Empire.

== Background ==
Aleixo Garcia, a Portuguese explorer, survived eight years as a castaway before leading an expedition into the Inca Empire with the Guaraní. The Guaraní, who referred to the Inca lands as the "Land without Evil," had experience raiding Andean regions. In 1524, Garcia, accompanied by Pacheco, a mulatto, and possibly a few other Europeans, set out from Santa Catarina. They passed Iguazu Falls and continued west to the site of modern Asunción, Paraguay.

== Expedition ==
Upon reaching Asunción, the Guaraní gathered an army of about 2,000 men and headed north along the Paraguay River. After crossing into the Itatín region, they turned west across the Gran Chaco, where the presence of a large force was likely necessary to counter the warlike Mbayá people who inhabited the area. After, the Guaraní army, accompanied by Garcia and his companions, climbed into the Andes and entered the Inca Empire near Tarabuco, Bolivia, a wealthy outpost of the Incas. They proceeded to raid and plunder the area, seizing silver, cloth, jewelry, and slaves. This made Garcia and his small group the first Europeans to enter the Inca Empire, almost a decade before Francisco Pizarro. The Incas, previously unaware of the European presence among the invaders, sent an army of 20,000 men to repel them. The Guaraní army and the Europeans retreated with their spoils, retracing their path across the Gran Chaco.

== Aftermath ==
On reaching the Paraguay River, Garcia hoped to mount a larger force for a renewed attack on the Incas. To prove the success of his expedition and gather reinforcements, he sent either Guaraní or Portuguese messengers back to his allies on the Atlantic coast, bearing about 40 kg of silver. However, in late 1525, before he could realize his plans, Garcia was murdered by the Guaraní, possibly over the wealth and slaves he had taken. Stories of his expedition and the wealth he had obtained soon spread, inspiring later Spanish explorers, notably Sebastian Cabot, to venture into the lands that Garcia had first reached.
