= Julio Salvador Sagreras =

Argentine guitarist, pedagogue, and composer

Julio Salvador Sagreras (22 November 1879 – 20 July 1942) was an Argentine guitarist, pedagogue, and composer.

== Life and career ==
Sagreras was born in Buenos Aires. Both his parents were guitarists who taught him the guitar very early – his father was Gaspar Sagreras (1838–1901). Julio Sagreras participated in concerts from the age of 6. At age 12, he studied piano and composition. He progressed quickly and became a professor of guitar at the Académia de Bellas Artes in 1899. In Buenos Aires, he met the editor Francisco Nuñez, who later published a hundred compositions of Sagreras. In 1905 he opened his own school, Academia de Guitarra. Between 1900 and 1936, Sagreras gave many concerts in concert halls and salons, and also participated in radio broadcasts.

Sagreras is also known for his methodical and well-annotated guitar instruction series. It consists of seven books that take the student from the beginner to the advanced stage. The series is so well thought out and so incrementally progressive that it has often been said that the student can teach himself. In addition to Sagreras' Lecciones ..., other famous works for guitar include Maria Luisa (a mazurka), El Zorzal (Estilo), Violetas (Waltz), and the virtuosic El Colibri.

Sagreras also published a number of pieces under the pseudonym "S. Resgrasa".
