= Aleixo Garcia =

Early 16th-century Portuguese explorer, conquistador

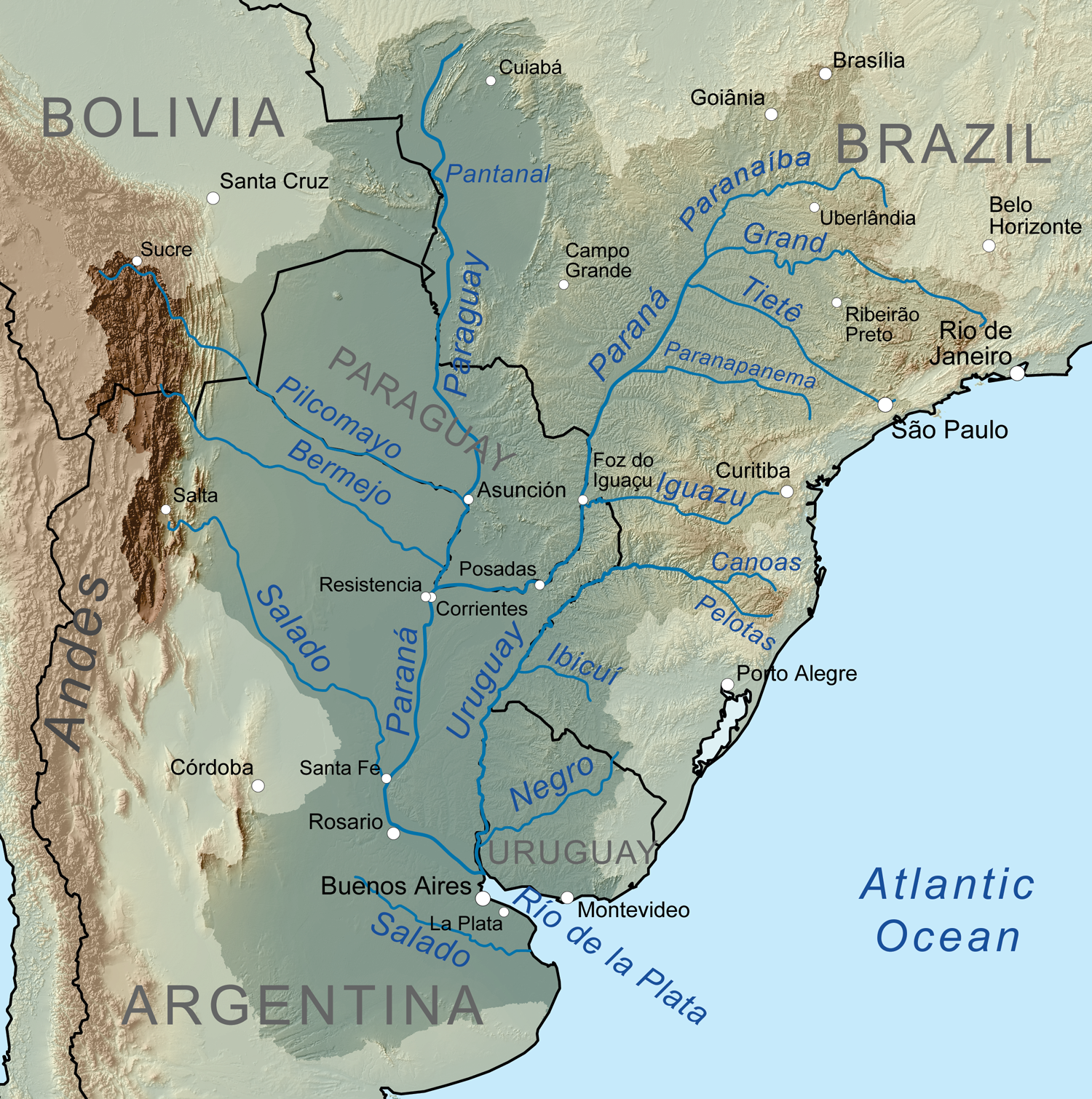
- Garcia's journey to the Inca Empire began on the Atlantic coast north of Porto Alegre and ended near Sucre, Bolivia.
- Born: Date unknown Alentejo, Kingdom of Portugal
- Died: 1525; Near Paraguay River, north of Asunción
- Occupations: Explorer; conquistador
- Known for: First European to reach the Inca Empire

Aleixo Garcia, also known in Spanish as Alejo García, (died 1525) was a Portuguese explorer and conquistador in service to Spain. He was a castaway who lived in Brazil and explored Paraguay and Bolivia. On a raiding expedition with a Guaraní army, Garcia and a few colleagues were the first Europeans known to have come into contact with the Inca Empire.

== Castaway ==
Garcia was possibly a member of the failed expedition of Juan Díaz de Solís in 1515 and 1516, which sought a sea passage from the Atlantic to the Pacific Ocean. After reaching the mouths of the Uruguay and Paraná rivers, it was apparent that the Río de la Plata was not such a strait. At this point, Solís and several crew members were killed by the indigenous people (Indians or Indios), variously identified as the Charrúa or Guaraní). His lieutenants opted to return to Spain.

On their return, some of their boats were shipwrecked off Santa Catarina Island in present-day Brazil. Among the 11 or 18 Spanish and Portuguese survivors was Aleixo Garcia, a Portuguese adventurer. Shipwrecked with Garcia were a Portuguese sailor Henrique Montes (a veteran of the Gonçalo Coelho and Amerigo Vespucci expeditions), a mulatto named Francisco Pacheco, and the Spanish sailor Melchior Ramírez. Melchior Ramírez, in turn, would assist and guide Cristóvão Jacques on his voyage of exploration to the Río de la Plata and the Paraná River in 1521, returning again to Santa Catarina.

Aleixo Garcia traveled inland, living among the Guaranís and learning to speak their language. Since time immemorial a network of trails called Peabiru criss-crossed this region of South America, linking the lands of the Guaraní to the Inca Empire nearly 1,000 km (620 miles) distant across the semi-arid Gran Chaco. A Spaniard later described the Peabiru as "a path of eight spans [about 1.8 meters or six feet] wide on which the grass grows very short." During his travels, Garcia heard tales of a "white king" who lived to the west, ruling cities of incomparable riches and splendor.

== Raiding the Incas ==
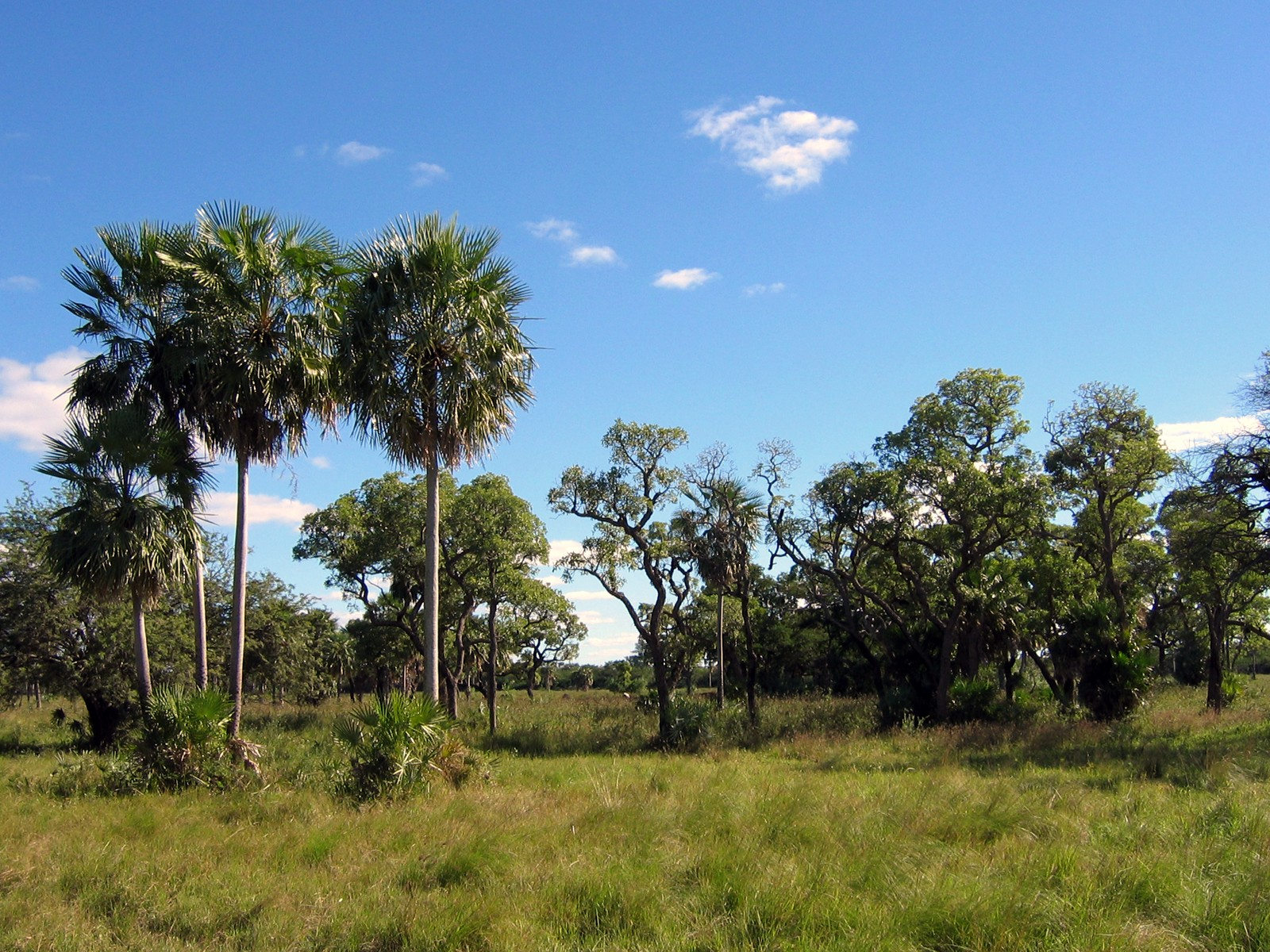
The northern Chaco in Paraguay

After eight years as a castaway Garcia joined a Guaraní invasion of the Inca Empire far to the west. The Inca Empire was known to the Guaraní as the "Land without Evil." The Guaraní were familiar with the route, having raided the Andean homelands of the Inca on at least one previous occasion. In 1524, Garcia, the mulatto Pacheco, and possibly a few more Spaniards and Portuguese set out from Santa Catarina to journey westward to what would become the site of Asunción, Paraguay, passing Iguazu Falls en route. They were probably the first Europeans to see the waterfall.

At the site of Asunción, the Guaraní gathered an army of 2,000 men. The army followed the Paraguay River northward, crossing the river a few miles south of the future site of Corumbá, Brazil near the edge of the Pantanal wetland in the Itatín region. The Europeans and Guaranís then traveled westward, crossing the semi-arid flatlands of the northern Gran Chaco of Bolivia. A large army was probably necessary to cross the Gran Chaco as this was the homeland of the warlike and nomadic Mbayá, a Guaycuru speaking people. After crossing the Gran Chaco, the Guaraní army and the Europeans climbed into the Andes, entering the Inca Empire and reaching Tarabuco, Bolivia. Tarabuco was a rich outpost of the Incas and the army plundered the riches of the area, mostly silver, cloth, jewelry, and slaves. Garcia and his companions were the first Europeans to enter the Inca Empire, accomplishing this eight years before Francisco Pizarro. The Incas were not aware that among the invaders were Europeans, a people unknown to them at the time.

According to one account, the Incas responded by sending an army of 20,000 men to repel the invaders. The Guaraní army and the Europeans retreated back the way they had come, laden with their plunder. Reaching the Paraguay River, Garcia wanted to resume the attack on the Incas with a larger army. He sent men, either Guaraní or Portuguese (accounts differ), back to his colleagues who had remained on the Atlantic coast with two or three arrobas, about 40 kg (88 lb), of silver to demonstrate the success of the raid and to request reinforcements. He remained behind with most of the plundered goods, but in late 1525, he was murdered by the Guaraní. The reasons for his murder are unknown, but possibly it was for the silver and slaves he had acquired in the raid.

Stories of Garcia's expedition and the wealth he acquired encouraged other Spanish explorers, notably Sebastian Cabot, to explore the region Garcia first visited.
