= Juan Alais =

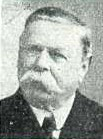
- Born: December 7, 1844; Buenos Aires, Argentina
- Died: October 7, 1914 (aged 69); Buenos Aires, Argentina
- Other name: Juan Alais Moncada
- Occupations: Composer, Guitarist

Juan Alais Moncada, also known as Juan el Inglés, (December 7, 1844 in Buenos Aires, Argentina - October 7, 1914) was an Argentine guitarist and composer.

== Life ==
Juan Alais was born in Buenos Aires, Argentina. He was the son of Valentín Alais, who was English, and the Argentine Felipa Moncada.

While his name was gaining popularity, his friends nicknamed him "Juan el Inglés" ("John the Englishman") due to his English ancestry. In 1870, he graduated as a music professor. Later, he joined the orchestra of the Teatro Colón.

Alais was one of the two teachers of Gustavo Sosa Escalada. The other was Carlos García Tolsa. At the age of 13, Agustín Barrios played works by Juan Alais such as La Perezosa and La Chinita.

In his Dictionary of Guitarists (1934), Domingo Prat calls Juan Alais "the first composer for guitar in Argentina." Abel Carlevaro and Julio Martínez Oyanguren have recorded his works.
