= Museo Nacional de Bellas Artes de Asunción =

Art museum in Asunción, Paraguay

National Museum of Fine Arts of Asunción
- Museo Nacional de Bellas Artes de Asunción
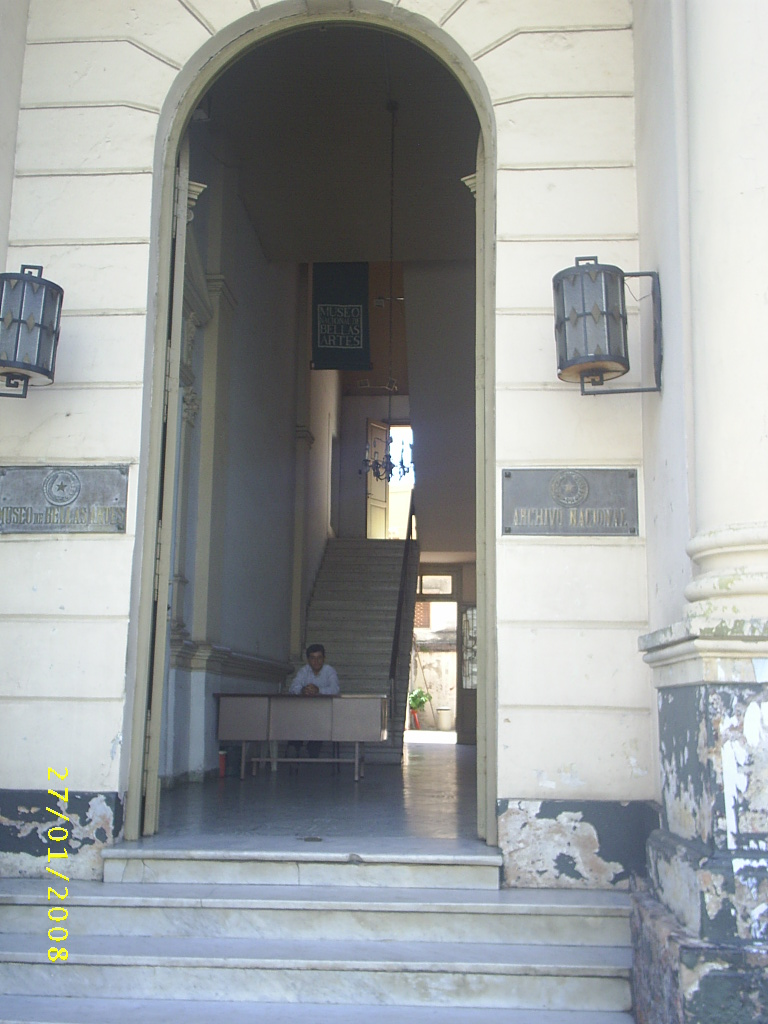
- Nacional Museum Bellas Artes in Asunción
- Established: 1909
- Location: Mcal
- Coordinates: 25.2887°S 57.6212°W
- Collections: 650 works of art, paintings, sculptures, ceramics, prints, photographs, Paraguayan and international artists.
- Founder: Silvano Godoy
- Director: Regina Duarte

The National Museum of Fine Arts of Asunción (Spanish: Museo Nacional de Bellas Artes de Asunción), located on Mcal. Estigarribia and Iturbe St. in Asunción, the capital city of Paraguay, displays over 650 works of art, paintings, sculptures, ceramics, prints, photographs, Paraguayan and international artists. As well as antique coins, furniture and various objects that belonged to its creator.

The museum was founded in 1909 by the collector Silvano Godoi, the first director-general of museums and archives in Paraguay.

In the same building is the National Archives, which houses the largest collection of documents relating to the country's history.

== History ==
=== Arts in Paraguay ===
Unlike other Latin American countries, which began after the Conquest a virtually continuous production and valuation of works of art, in Paraguay, the evolution of the arts in general was marked by the difficult course of its history.

The rich tradition of craftsmanship ethnicities populated the various territories that make up the country today, had no impact recognized during the colonization process. However, the arrival of the Franciscan and Jesuit missionaries marked a gradual transformation in music, architecture and, more importantly, at the height of images, which played a decisive role in the ability of native crafts.

After the expulsion of the Society of Jesus and the decline in the Franciscan presence, there was a sudden interruption in artistic production. This situation only began to change timidly in the 19th century with the emergence of two Paraguayan painters: Saturio Rios and Aurelio Garcia, whose arrival coincided with European architects and builders who helped define the urban profile of the city of Asunción, capital of the new republic.

Although the Paraguayan War (1864–1870) hindered the development of the arts, it offered an ideal scenario for the cultivation of satirical illustration. Journals El Cabichuí and El Centinela, edited and printed on the front, represent two priceless examples, both from a historical point of view as aesthetic. For the impression his illustrations, both used the technique of etching, taking Gregorio Cáceres as one of its main creators.

The massive influx of immigrants, among them several European artists, scored a valuable imprint on the development of national art. The Italian Guido Boggiani, discovers the indigenous art; academic Héctor Da Ponte, is dedicated to the training of young, and French July Mornet, remained seven years in Paraguay, where, among other activities, held a number of paintings that adorned the ceiling of Palace Lopez.

Thanks to the efforts of Guido Boggiani and the collaboration of some cultural institutions, several young artists, Carlos Colombino, Juan Samudio, among others, had the opportunity to access scholarships in Italy, where he perfected his techniques in various schools of academic orientation. Upon his return, were devoted mainly to painting landscapes and portraits.

=== Juan Silvano Godoy ===
For those same years, Juan Silvano Godoi, (1850–1926) a politician wealthy Paraguayan family, is given the task of shaping the first collection of plastic arts that come to the country.

Due to the difficulties of Paraguayan politics, was forced to travel abroad on numerous occasions, which provided it with the purchase of a valuable collection of paintings and sculptures, among which works outstand Courbet, Murillo, Tintoretto, among others. Juan Silvano Godoi tilted mainly toward the late 19th-century painting, ranging from simple naturalism and academicism. His collection also was enriched by artists from Rio de la Plata.

In the early years of the 20th century, the Paraguayan Government expressed the wish that all his works, were reunited within an institution, thereby laying the foundations for the current National Museum of Fine Arts.

The Museum Godoy was finally established in 1909 under the direction of itself Godoy, until his death. In 1939, the institution was formalized by the State as National Museum of Bellas Artes.

== Consolidation phase ==
The works acquired by Juan Silvano Godoi come from artists of the 17th century, Italian and French half of 19th century, creators of Argentines who acquired some significance in subsequent decades and, of course, a whole generation of painters Paraguayans: Andres Campos Cervera, Carlos Colombino, Juan Samudio, Jaime Bestard, Holden Roberto Jara, Pablo Alborno, Modesto Delgado Rodas and Ignacio Núñez Soler, representatives of a school still in its infancy, but vibrant forces and energies.

Among the works of Paraguayan artists stand out the collection of drawings Miguel Acevedo, a satirical vision of the so-called belle époque and its characters, composed of fifty-seven original works, considered one of the series more important that the museum owns.

The year 1989 saw the start of a new relationship with the museum's public opening exhibitions of national and foreign artists, performing and organizing various educational and cultural activities, which have earned him recognition by the new generations.

Memorable exhibitions include the sample of German contemporary graphic display of fabrics and ethnic Bolivians. Also stresses exposure Jataity vive, which shows finely embroidered clothes covered in orpoi.

The museum has a team of expert restorers to care for the museum's collection.

== Museum's collection ==
=== Paraguayan painting ===
The collection of Paraguayan paintings has works by artists of the 19th century as Saturio Rios, Aurelio Garcia. Among the artists of the 20th century stand Andres Campos Cervera, Pablo Alborno, Juan Samudio, Hector Da Ponte, Miguel Acevedo, Modesto Delgado Rodas, Roberto Holden Jara, Jaime Bestard, Fabiola Adam, Ofelia Echagüe Vera, Laura Marquez, Olga Blinder, Edith Jiménez, Carlos Colombino.

=== International painting ===
Countries with the largest number of works are: Argentina, Brazil, Spain, France, Uruguay and Italy. They are also represented Germany, Bolivia, United States, Peru, Chile, Belgium, Korea, and Philippines.

=== Sculpture ===
Among the collection of sculptures highlighting the works of artists Paraguayans Patricia Ayala, Andres Campos Cervera, Roberto Ayala, Hugo Pistilli, Jorge Wheat and Angel Yegros and carvings created in the Reductions. The museum also displays works of sculpture by artists from France, Italy, and Argentina.

== Individual collections ==
The museum holds the following collections:

- Saturio Ríos
  - El Obispo Manuel Palacios

- Andrés Campos Cervera
  - El Portalet, Vila Joyosa
  - Caacupe
  - Esopo
  - Cabeza de India
  - Pottery

- Pablo Alborno
  - Cabeza de viejo
  - Muchacho con azada
  - Lapacho rosado
  - Lapacho amarillo
  - Anticoli
  - Paisaje veneciano

- Juan Samudio
  - El árbol de Artigas
  - Paisaje de Venecia
  - Una noche en Burano

- Roberto Holden
  - Campesino con niño
  - Mujer campesina
  - Retrato de Julio Correa

- Olga Blinder
  - Cabeza
  - Chiperas
  - Ñandutí III

- Jaime Bestard
  - El patio de mi madre
  - Campesino trabajando en trapiche

- Miguel Acevedo
  - Arsenio López Decoud
  - El violinista Fernando Centurión
  - Jean Paul Casabianca
  - José Rodríguez Alcalá
