= Leonor Cecotto =

Argentine artist (died 1982)

- Born: 1918, 1920 or 1922; Formosa, Argentina
- Died: 8 May 1982 (aged 59-64); Asunción, Paraguay
- Known for: Engraving, painting

Leonor Cecotto (died 8 May 1982, Asunción, Paraguay) was a 20th-century Latin American painter and engraver. Born in Argentina, she resided in Paraguay for most of her life, eventually becoming a prominent artist in the latter country. She was known for both her paintings and her xylographs.

== Biography ==
Cecotto was born in Formosa, Argentina, in 1918, 1920 or 1922. Her parents were Vicente González Leiva (Spanish) and Catalina Cecotto (Argentine). Her father was a piano tuner, and she initially studied piano, and taught piano to earn money. From a young age, Leonor Cecotto resided in Paraguay.

Cecotto was largely self-educated, in part because her father forbade her to attend the Ateneo Paraguayo. She was taught drawing and painting privately at home, by a French artist, Francis Eugene Charles. In the 1950s she approached João Rossi, a Brazilian professor at a YMCA-hosted arts workshop. Rossi—known as a driving force for a "modernization" of the contemporary Paraguayan plastic arts—introduced Cecotto to professional art. Cecotto was also influenced by Livio Abramo, a Brazilian-born engraver who also resided in Paraguay and taught woodcut courses.

As a result of her contributions, Cecotto is considered part of the Grupo Arte Nuevo, a school of influential 20th-century Paraguayan artists. Cecotto was a founder of the Centro de Artistas Plasticos del Paraguay, and taught drawing and painting at the Female Institute of Integrated Culture in Asunción.

She died in Asuncion in 1982.

== Reception ==
In Paraguay, Cecotto earned several awards, most notably the First Prize for Painting in the Second Salon d'Automne and the first prize in an engraving contest organized by the Centro Cultural Paraguayo Americano in 1966.

In his 1984 book Una interpretación de las artes visuales en el Paraguay, Paraguayan art critic (and future Paraguayan minister of culture) Ticio Escobar noted of the artist;

Leonor Cecotto’s image is ‘naive’ in the literal sense of the term; it treats things with good faith and no reserve, directly and without malice. When it narratively represents certain aspects overlooked by our artistic tradition...it does so frankly, without irony. Leonor began developing her printwork from the beginning of the Paraguayan printing tradition, but it reaches maturity at the end of the 1960s. Leonor uses certain themes, like neighborhood scenes, that serve as stepping stones to adjust the images and develop their content. Leonor’s painting follows a similar path as her printmaking and coincides with it at certain points; her disproportionate flowers with aggressive colors.. and her final oleo paintings, which include dolls and mannequins in situations characterized by foppishness, express, in different ways, this melancholic enchantment with the obvious and the trivial that characterizes Leonor’s oeuvre (Note: Translated by Raquel Salas Rivera on 2 March 2019 at an event hosted by PMA and Wikipedia. Original quote reads; “La imagen de Leonor Cecotto es ‘ingenua’ en el sentido literal del término; se refiere a las cosas de buena fe y sin reservas, directamente y sin malicia. Cuando representa con un sentido narrativo ciertos aspectos descuidados por nuestra tradición plástica… lo hace en forma franca, desprovista de toda ironía. La obra gráfica de Leonor comienza a desarrollarse desde los inicios del grabado paraguayo pero adquiere su madurez recién desde finales de la década del 60. Leonor parte de ciertos temas, como las escenas de barrio, que no constituyen más que los pasos iniciales para ajustar sus imágenes y desarrollar sus contenido. La pintura de Leonor sigue un camino paralelo a su grabado y coincide con él en algunos puntos; sus flores desmesuradas de colores agresivos… y sus últimos óleos, que representan muñecas y manequíes en situaciones signadas por la cursilería, expresan, de diferentes maneras, ese melancólico encantamiento de lo obvio y lo trivial que caracteriza la obra de Leonor”)

Cecotto's work can be found in the Metropolitan Museum of Art, the National Library of France, the Art Museum of the Americas, in the collection of the University of Sydney, the Centro de Artes Visuales de Asunción, and in private collections.

== Exhibitions ==
Year	Exhibition
1951	Exhibited her work for the first time in Asunción.
1953	Participated in International Exhibitions, most notably of which was the International Exhibition of Painters in Chicago (United States of America)
1960	Participated in the First Latin American Competition of Xylography in Buenos Aires.
1963	VII São Paulo Biennial Exhibition (Brazil).
1963	I International Engraving Biennial in Santiago de Chile.
1964	IV Engraving Biennial in Tokyo.
1965	South American Art Exposition at the Braniff International, at the University of Texas.
1965	II International Engraving Biennial in Santiago de Chile.
1966	IV International Exhibition of Black and White in Lugano (Switzerland).
1967	South American Engraving Exposition at the Cegrí Gallery in New York City.
1967	Exposition of Contemporary Paraguayan Painting at the Panamerican Union in Washington D. C.
1968	First Ibero-American Biennial Exhibition of Painting, organized by the Coltejer Factory of Medellín (Colombia).
1968	Exposition at the Muestra Internacionale della Grafica at the Unión Florentina of Florence (Italy).
1969	X São Paulo Biennial Exhibition.
1971	XI São Paulo Biennial Exhibition.
1971	Museum of Modern Art, New York
1972	III Latin American Art Biennial, organized by the Coltejer Factory of Medellín.
2009	Retrospective show, El Centro Cultural Paraguayo Americano y Amigos del Arte.
