= Ofelia Echagüe Vera =

Paraguayan painter and educator

- self portrait
- Born: 1904; Asunción, Paraguay
- Died: 1987 (aged 82–83); Asunción, Paraguay
- Education: Escuela Superior de Bellas Artes de la Nación Ernesto de la Cárcova
- Known for: Painting, Education

Ofelia Echagüe Vera (1904–1987) was a painter and educator from Asunción, Paraguay. She is credited as a founder of modern art in Paraguay, through her work in the plastic arts, and through her influence upon her students, particularly Olga Blinder, Pedro Di Lascio, and Aldo Del Pino, who became the vanguard of the new movement. The work of Ofelia Echagüe Vera marked the beginning of a new period that changed the role of women in Paraguayan plastic arts.

== Early life ==
Ofelia Echagüe began studying in her home city of Asunción with Héctor Da Ponte, Modesto Delgado Rodas, Pablo Alborno, and Adán Kunos. She was awarded a scholarship to Montevideo, Uruguay, where she defined her vocation carrying out studies under the direction of Professor Domingo Bazzurro (1939-1941). In Buenos Aires, Argentina, she did work with Alfredo Guido and Emilio Centurión, and she graduated from the Escuela Superior de Bellas Artes de la Nación Ernesto de la Cárcova. (Note: Translated with the assistance of Raquel Salas Rivera on 2 March 2019 at an event hosted by the Philadelphia Museum of Art and Wikipedia.) In the 1950s, Echagüe further collaborated with Livio Abramo, a Brazilian artist commissioned by the Brazilian Cultural Mission to Asuncion, Paraguay. Together, they developed the technique of woodcut prints, an intricate and complicated art form.

== Career path ==
Paraguayan Art critic Ticio Escobar wrote of Ofelia Echagüe:

Su mejor obra creativa la realiza en el período inmediato a su vuelta al país y durante pocos años. En su exposición en el ‘Club Centenario,’ la primera individual, en 1946, ya están definidas las características fundamentales de su pintura: buena factura técnica, figuras rotundas de presencia escultórica, organización meditada del espacio en planos y volúmenes, fuerte sentido de la expresión y preferencia por el tema del desnudo femenino.

[She makes her best creative work in the period immediately after her return to the country in just a few years. In her exhibition at ‘Club Centenario,’ her first solo exhibit, in 1946, the fundamental characteristics of her painting are already defined: good technical quality, undeniable figures of sculptural presence, well-considered organization of space in planes and volumes, strong feeling of the expression, and preference for the theme of female nude.]

The work of Ofelia Echagüe, in the vision of Escobar, retains an “insistence of the formal aspects,” which don’t diminish what is expressed. Ticio Escobar also notes, “however her robust personality is structured in careful compositions and meditations that denounce the influence of post impressionism in the River Plate Region, and an unquestionable amount of significant related works to the existential problem of the man; Always at the bottom of loneliness and depression in half-empty environments invaded by cruel light, a feeling of isolation between his women of tough bodies and missing faces.”

Ofelia Echagüe participated in an important collective exhibition of Paraguayan plastic artists, which marked a turning point for a new period that changes the role of women in the Paraguayan plastic arts. From this perspective through her work, Ofelia Echagüe changes into an authentic precursor because it breaks the schematics of the excessively modest puritanism in that Paraguayan art period.

== Last years and death ==
When she returned to her country, Ofelia Echagüe was dedicated to teaching, specifically at the Ateneo Paraguayo first, and the Escuela de Bellas Artes after. She died in Asunción in 1987.
