= Boettner =

Boettner is a German surname. Notable people with the surname include:

- Daisie Boettner, US Army officer and mechanical engineering professor
- Juan Max Boettner, Paraguayan medical doctor and musical composer
- Loraine Boettner, American theologian, teacher, and author
- Luis Oscar Boettner, Paraguayan chess player
