= Jenaro =

Jenaro is a given name. Notable people with the name include:

- Jenaro de Urrutia Olaran (1893–1965), Spanish painter
- Jenaro Flores Santos (born 1941), Bolivian trade union leader and politician
- Jenaro Gajardo Vera (1919–1998), eccentric Chilean lawyer, painter and poet
- Jenaro Pérez Villaamil (1807–1854), Spanish painter
- Jenaro Pindú (1946–1993), prominent cartoonist, sculptor and architect of Paraguay
- Jenaro Quesada, 1st Marquis of Miravalles (1818–1889), Grandee of Spain
- Jenaro Sánchez Delgadillo (1886–1927), Mexican martyr who died in the Cristero War
- Josephine Apieu Jenaro Aken (1955–2008), member of the Luo group from the Bahr el Ghazal area

== See also ==
- Jenaro Herrera District, one of eleven districts of the province Requena in Peru
