= Paraguayan Indigenous art =

Art created by the indigenous peoples of Paraguay

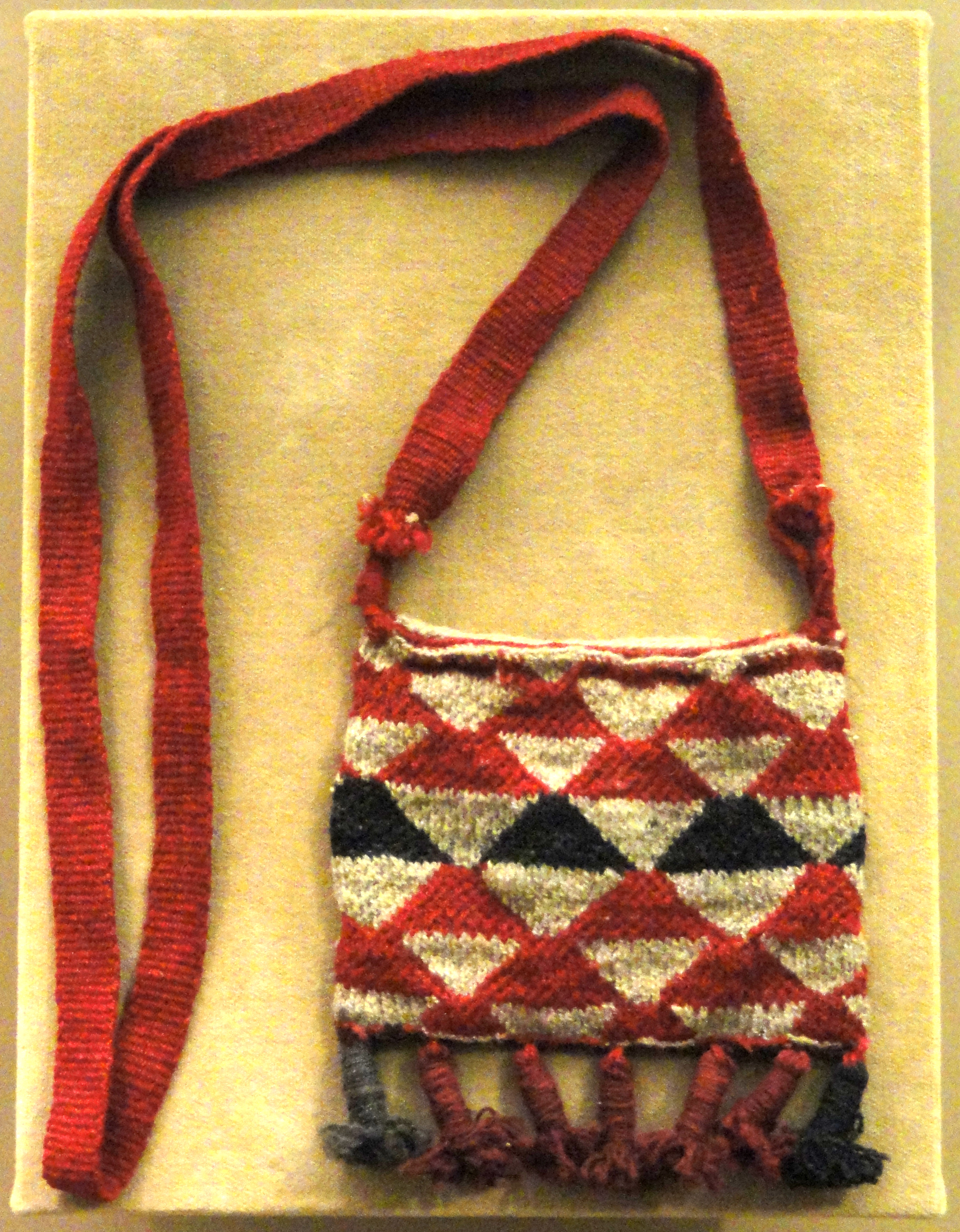
Nivaclé textile pouch, collection of the American Museum of Natural History

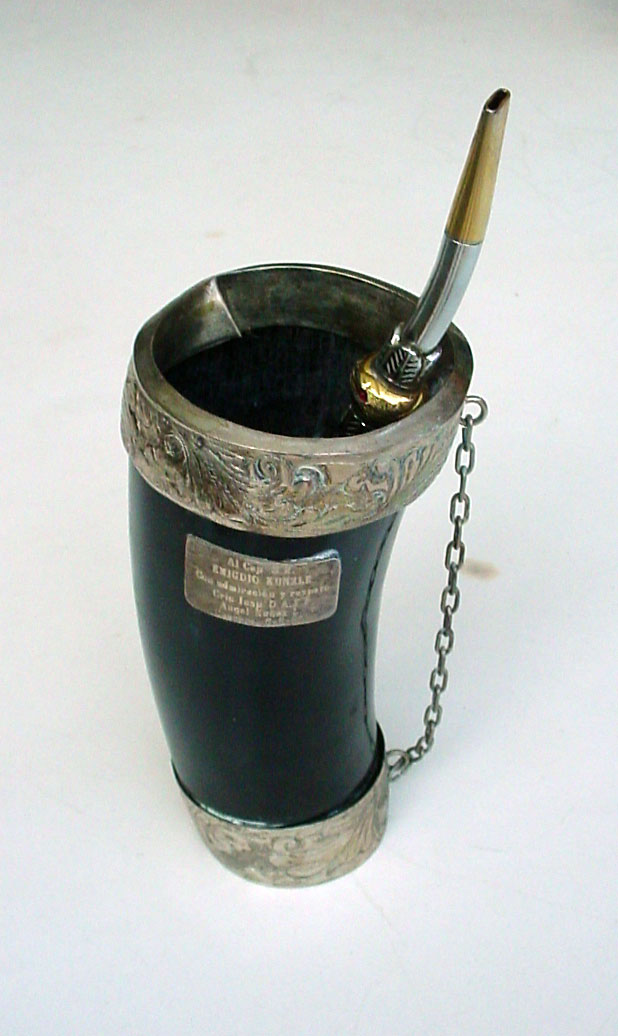
Guampa bombilla, for drinking tereré

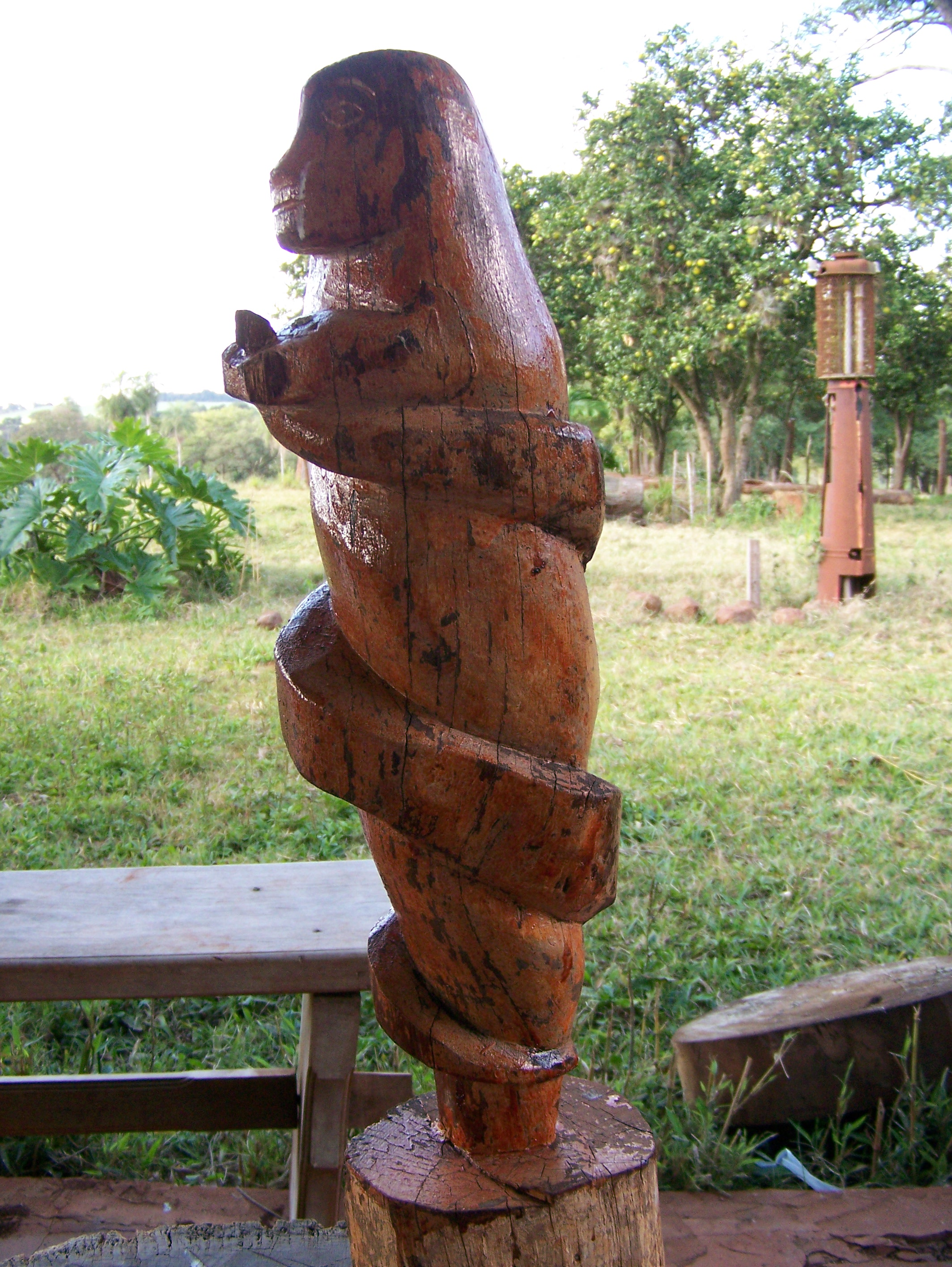
Pai Tavytera traditional woodcarving, Amambay Department, 2008

Paraguayan Indigenous art is the visual art created by the indigenous peoples of Paraguay. While indigenous artists embrace contemporary Western art media, their arts also include pre-Columbian art forms. Indigenous art includes ceramics, baskets, weaving and threading, feather art and leather work. It is a hybrid nature includes the embroideries, lace, woodcarving and different metal products. Paraguay is particularly known for its indigenous featherwork and basket weaving.

== Handmade products ==
The handmade products of Paraguay are of a great variety and comprise ceramic articles, as well as embroideries and sewn articles, as well as wood, baskets, leather work and silver work. Pre-Columbian ceramics made in the Paraguayan territory were rustic and made from terracotta clay. They were painted in red, and occasionally in black and white. The clay used to be worked by hand. Some tribes incised their pottery with decorations before firing.

The Spanish, especially the Jesuits, influenced the technical level of production and the finishing of the native ceramics. These had been characterized by extreme simplicity and production of functional goods. The Jesuits taught the Indian population in the missions.

Ceramic products produced today by some Indian groups include jars, flower vases, and some without specific shapes, as well as water vases. Among those, the pottery most widely sold today due to its beauty and quality comes from Tobaty and Ita.

== By media ==
=== Baskets weaving ===
Baskets are woven from the fibers of canes. Paraguayan Indians weave open baskets, baskets with handles, hand fans, shades, place mats, and especially piri, the typical Paraguayan hat of the country men. Leather products, such as bags, hats, sacks, etc. have their main centers in Limpio and Luque, where also centers for production of beautiful baskets. Materials for wickerwork include indigenous bromeliads including tacuarembó and caraguatá, as well as pindo palm leaves.

The rich Indian basket production of Paraguay is dividing by plantations. For example, in some communities where the main crop is cassava, baskets are solid with great storage capacity. The ajaka mbya basket is an average of 35 centimeters diameter with rigid supports that can to hold the heavy weight of the cassavas.

The ajak is a basket made by weaving tacuarembo and dark guembepi, making braided figures as well as geometric ones, in accordance with the Guaraní concept of beauty. The baskets associated with the production of corn are smaller and lighter and are constructed from pindo palm tree leaves.

=== Ceramics ===
Ceramics are an ancient art form in Paraguay, and ancient ceramics have been preserved through the centuries. Ceramics range from the utilitarian—cooking vessels, water jugs—to the sacred, such as funerary urns.

=== Featherwork ===
A precolumbian art form, featherwork provides distinctive personal adornment. Brilliantly colored feathers are fashioned into anklets, bracelets, collars, headdresses, and even entire cloaks. Guaraní medicine men used to wear full feather cloaks. The Guaraní create feather headdresses called jeguaka worn during ceremonial occasions.

=== Textile arts ===
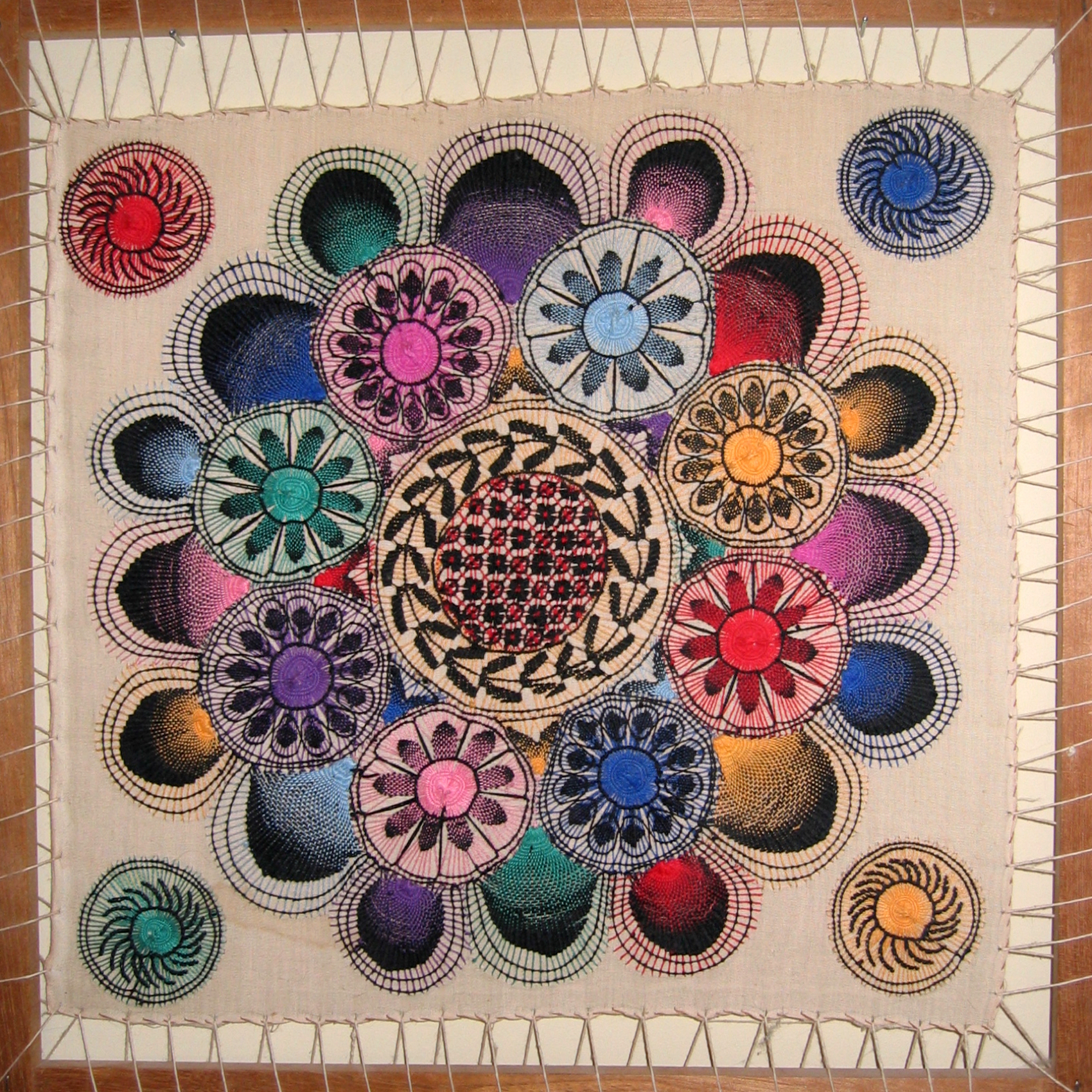
Ñandutí lace from Asunción, Paraguay

Indian embroidery, weaving, and other textile art are an important source of income for the domestic economy. Before the arrival of the Spanish, the Indians used a horizontal piece of material to make hammocks with cotton threads, as well as the baskets and bags to transport food and nets for fishing and hunting.

Later on they also knitted ponchos and other clothing items. As with ceramics, the Jesuits also introduced new techniques in this area, using the vertical frame to make the threads. Tribal artisans began producing sheets, towels, blankets, table clothes and other articles, as well as the special hammocks, which were knitted and still are with cotton threads and ornaments on the sides.

New technical resources brought by the Spanish inspired the typical cotton dresses, the ones called ao poi, made with a fine thread, and the povyi, a little wider thread weaving, as well as linen, and the beautiful ñanduti, which means "spider web" in Guaraní language and consists of fine embroidery, with which table clothes, curtains, blouses and more are made.

The most coveted textiles are the Ñandutí embroideries made in the cities of Guarambaré and Itauguá. Woven ponchos, known for their beauty and quality, are made by the ethnic groups Lengua, Maskoy, Nivaclé, and Wichí from the Gran Chaco. They use sheep wool tinted in red and the ones called of 60 lists, made in Pirayú and Yataity, in the Guairá Department.

=== Rock art ===
Ancient indigenous peoples of Paraguay carved petroglyphs into stone, particularly in the hills of Amambay Department.

=== Woodcarving ===
Wood is carved into ceremonial masks, smoking pipes, chairs known as apyká, and anthropomorphic and zoomorphic effigies. Gourds are also carves with images.

== By tribe ==
=== Chamacoco ===
The Chamacoco ethnic group, from the Alto Paraguay Department, used dresses during their annual ritual called Debylyby. These are knitted of special fibers. Associated masks are carved from the karaguata tree and adorned with feathers from Chaco birds.

The Chamacocos used a pupo, a protective vest made of karaguata. The pupo is knitted when the fibers are wet; these become rigid when dry and can serve as armor. They protected the wearer from the arrows of the enemies.

=== Karaguata ===
The weaving of Karaguata is an important element of Indigenous art in Paraguay. It is an expression of the Indian people of the Gran Chaco. The bags of Karaguata are some of the most common applications of fiber twining. Collector's bags are mainly used by women, who carry them on their backs and have a form of a large half moon. Hunting bags are smaller, rectangular, carried by men on their shoulders.

=== Paï-Tavytera ===
The Pai Tavytera from Eastern Paraguay and Brazil are known for their necklaces made from carved wood and colorful seeds of different fruits. They use urucú, a red dye made from Bixa orellana for body painting. Personal adornment is made from feathers, such as those of the toucan, and cotton. Labrets are made from resin. Men typically weave baskets, while women make ceramics. They are also being consulted in interpreting ancient rock art in Amambay.

=== Toba-Qom ===
The Toba tribe makes textiles from colorful wool threads, as well as the traditional bags, piri hats and carandilla leaf baskets.

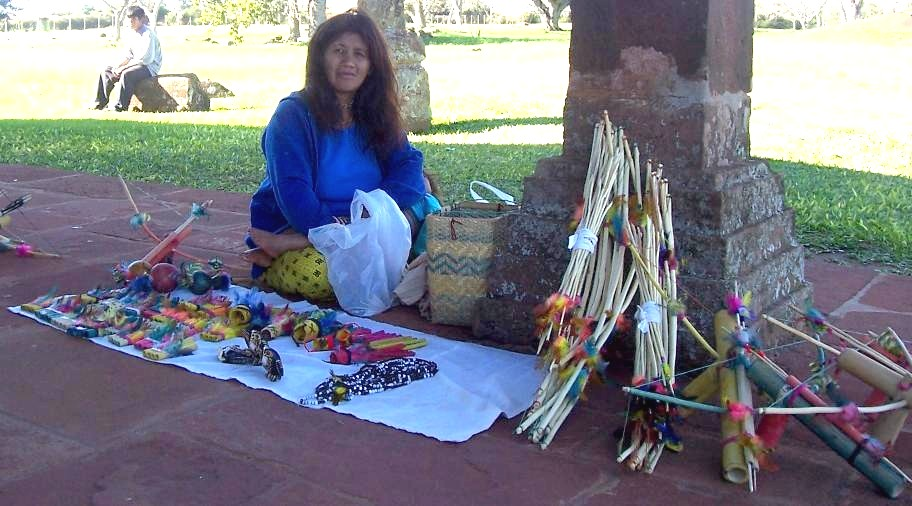
Guaraní artisan selling craftwork at a Jesuit Mission

=== Mbayá ===
The Mbayá Indians have a special ability in making baskets of natural tacuara, that are decorated with drawings of Guembepi and animals of the zone, as well as their necklaces and wood carving.

=== Ayoreo ===
The ayoreos bagas are one of the coveted Indian handiwork. These bags are made with karaguata fibers and exemplify rustic Indian beauty in its conception. The adherence to traditional aesthetics makes them extremely attractive. The Ayoreo also make dishes and spoons of Palo Santo wood and feather art.

=== Maka ===
The members of the Maka tribe are excellent weavers. Their traditional blankets, belts, and other elements are knitted with colorful threads.

=== Ava Guaraní ===
Ava Guaraní are highly skilled at making baskets and hammocks. They use karaguata fibers, as well as guembepi for baskets that represent a novelty in the Indian work of the country.

== Social context ==
The art produced by these two ways of living, nomadic and sedentary, reflect the difference of each one. The communities based in the recollection system are nomads. Therefore, their lifestyle allows for a more flexible and open culture, with many adaptations. In the other extreme, the Guaraní agricultural society is very attached to the land and its natural cycles, and naturally presents a conservative tendency, which can be closed to innovations. They distinguish their own from the other's property and have ongoing issues about the need to absorb or reject the foreign influences.

Despite the differences in these societies and the special characteristics of each one, scholars say that it is possible to establish some shared elements in all Indian communities who live or have lived in Paraguay. Indigenous art – through its symbols and the free exercise of tribal languages – is one of the most important manifestations of indigenous culture in Paraguay.

== Ceremonies and rituals ==
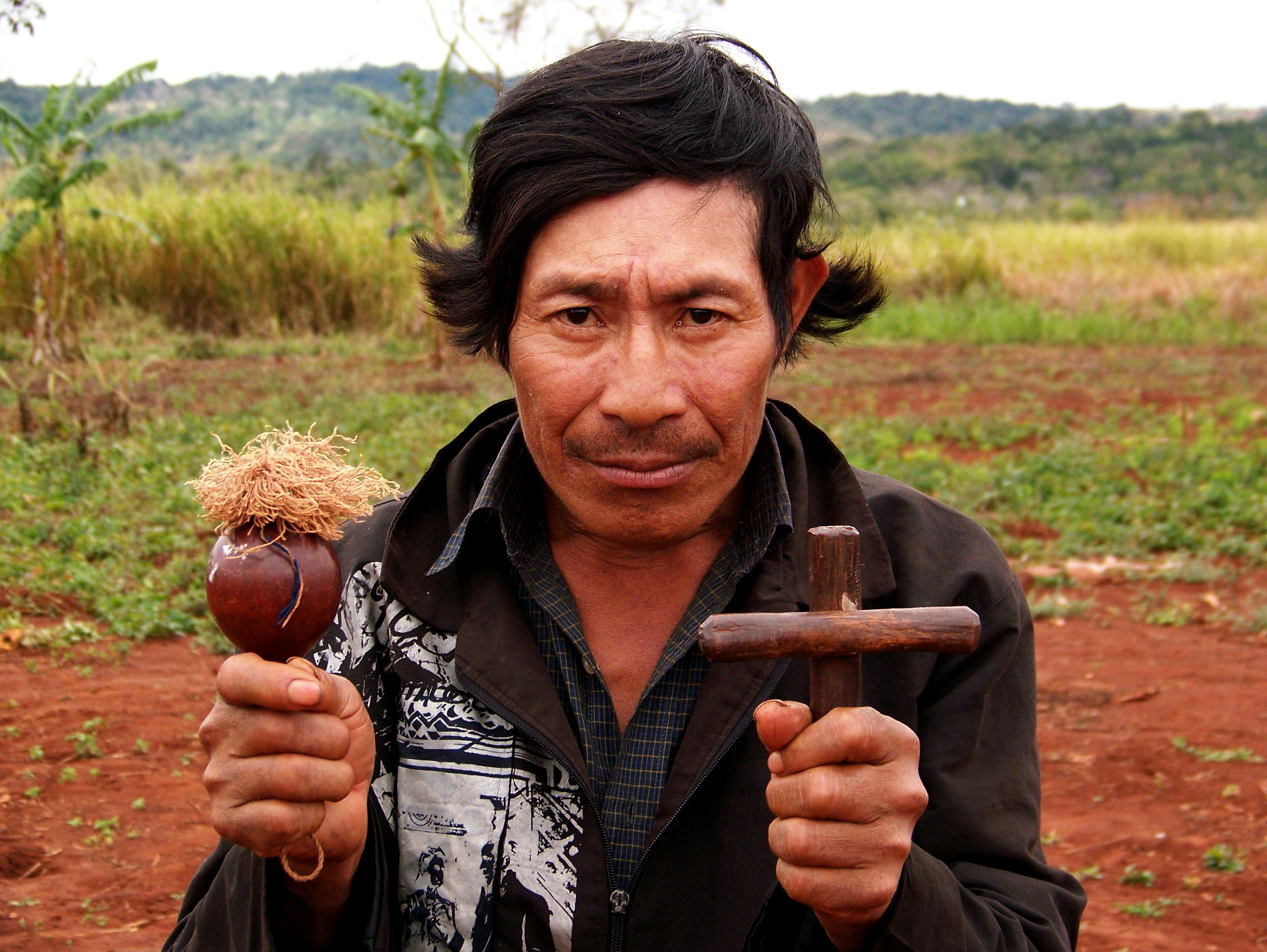
Guaraní spiritual leader with ceremonial gourd rattle and cross, 2006

Both the collectors and the agricultural societies have as a social nucleus, a mythical body-ritual, from where they can articulate and develop political power, in the judicial order, free time, beauty, and religion.

The mythical axis mundi-ritual, in essence the Indian cosmology, is composed of communal ceremonies. These are the moments when the community, through songs, dances and rites, show their identity. Indigenous art finds its first fundamental origins in those ceremonies and in the human body–its principal support. Feathers use in ornamentation, tattoos, and body paintings in the case of the Chaco Indians and the feather art among the Guaraní constitute basic elements of the Indigenous art in Paraguay.

== Museums ==
A number of museums are dedicated to showcased indigenous Paraguayan art. These include the Guido Boggiani Museum in San Lorenzo and in Asunción, the Andrés Barbero Ethnographic Museum, the Museum of Indigenous Art, and the Museo del Barro (Museum of Clay).

== See also ==
- Tembetá
- Ticio Escobar, Paraguayan art critic and curator

== Bibliography ==
- Paraguay, Nuestro País, Ediciones Nuevo Mundo.
- Turismo Rutas Guia Nº 19.
