= Museo del Barro =

Museum located on Asunción, Paraguay

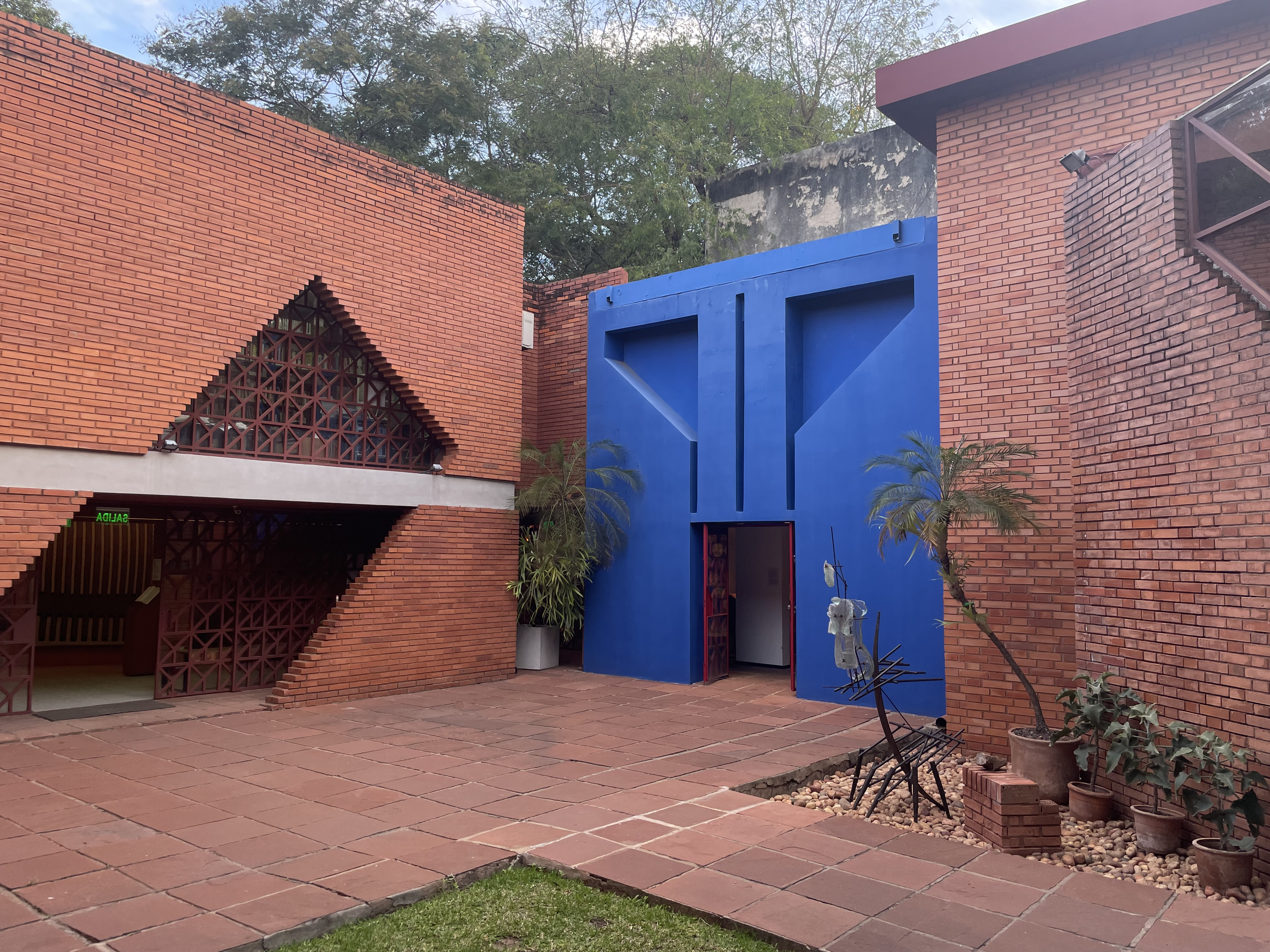
- Museum Courtyard in 2025
- Established: 1979
- Location: Asunción, the capital of Paraguay.
- Collections: prints and drawings for public spaces and educational displays.
- Collection size: The clay museum houses over 300 pieces of pre-Columbian ceramics, and contains some 4,000 items of wood, fabric, and metal from the 17th century to the present day

Museo del Barro is a museum located on the outskirts of Asunción, the capital of Paraguay. Initially, it was a private, traveling collection that, after seven years, secured a permanent home. The museum now comprises three distinct divisions: a pottery museum, an indigenous art museum and a contemporary art collection.

== History ==
Olga Blinder and Carlos Colombino a circulating collection in 1972 of prints and drawings for public spaces and educational displays. As their collection grew and diversified, they needed a permanent location to house it.

The Museo del Barro was founded in 1979 as a private institution to house the large indigenous pottery collection (clay) reflected in its name. However, it also serves as the Indigenous Art Museum and the Museum of Contemporary Arts of Paraguay. The three divisions make up the bulk of the museum's collection. Originally the location was in San Lorenzo but with expansions, and natural disasters.

The clay museum houses over 300 pieces of pre-Columbian ceramics, and contains some 4,000 items of wood, fabric, and metal from the 17th century to the present day.

In the indigenous section are 1,700 pieces produced by the different ethnic groups that make up the Paraguayan population. Baskets, masks and feather work typify the collection.

The third part of the museum is dedicated to contemporary artists from throughout Latin America. There are approximately 3,000 works by Paraguayan, Argentinean, Brazilian, and Chilean artists, including drawings, paintings, prints, sculpture and mixed media. Livio Abramo is one of the featured artists as is Mayeli Villalba, Pedro Agüero, Mabel Arcondo, Olga Blinder, Luis Alberto Boh, Carlos Colombino, Ricardo Migliorisi, and others.
