= Jenaro Pindú =

- Born: 1946; Asunción, Paraguay
- Died: 1993 (aged 46–47); Asunción, Paraguay
- Known for: Architecture
- Spouse: José Alberto Pérez Meza
- Awards: Prize Honors, "Plastic Arts SMCC (1966)

Jenaro Pindú (1946–1993) was a Paraguayan cartoonist, sculptor and architect. He was a student of Hermann Guggiari, one of the best-known Paraguayan sculptors of the 20th century.

== Trajectory ==
His long career in the Paraguayan art world stretched from 1966 until 1983.

Year	Activities resaltantes
1966	Participation in "Plastica Paraguaya", a contest organized by the Paraguayan American Cultural Center, CCPA, in the "John F. Kennedy" Gallery and the first public auction of sculptures in the same cultural center.
1967	Participation in the Ninth Biennial of St. Paul. Exhibition at the Yacht Club San Bernardino. Displays in the Paraguayan Red Cross Center. Illustration of the book of poetry, BAM and sculpture displays in the halls of CEPRO.
1968	Realization of the " Poetic Audiovisual" Participation in the "Paraguayans Artists" exhibition at the Club Concepcion. Collective exhibition at the Cultural Center of Villarrica. Illustration and publishing of his poems in the magazine "Today" and exhibition of paintings, prints and sculpture at Goethe College.
1969	Participation in the collective exhibition in the Ypacarai Public Library. Participation in the "Paraguayan Artists" exhibition at CCPA. Participation in "Art 69" in the YMCA. Illustrators of "Bridge over the Tapecué"
1970	Individual exhibition in Miro Gallery and collective exhibition in the House Argentina
1972	Exhibition of painting and sculpture at the Faculty of Philosophy of National University of Asuncion. Participation in "Sculpture Today" at the Central Bank of Paraguay and collective exhibition in the CCPA.
1973	Exhibition of the Paraguayan Sample Theatre in the Brazilian Cultural Mission
1975	Participation in the Exhibition of the Paraguayan Sample at CCPA
1976	Collective exhibition in the Gallery in Latin American, "Current Drawing of Paraguay" in the Art-sans Gallery. Exhibition of Graphic Arts of the Americas (XXVIII tribute to the anniversary of the Charter of the OEA) in the CCPA. Participation in the exhibition Paraguayan Sample Theater at the Centro Cultural Juan de Salazar
1977	Participation in the Second Biennial (Uruguay) and "Drawing and Printmaking in Paraguay" at the Centro Cultural Juan de Salazar
1978	"Image / Message of Latin America" at the Cultural Center of Villeparis (France). "Catastrophic Art" at the Art-sans Gallery. Collective Exhibition in Sepia Gallery. Exhibition "Paraguayans Artists" at the Metropolitan Seminar of Asuncion
1979	Participation at the Third Biennial of Maldonado (Uruguay). Displays of the journalists' association of Paraguay in the CCPA. "Paraguayan Illustrators" at the Museum of Folk Art and Contemporary Art of Paraguay Villeta. Collective exhibition at the Gallery Aristos. "Paraguayan Plastic Art in Hispanic Heritage Week" at the Institute of Hispanic Culture of Guaira Villarrica. Collective exhibition at the Art-sans Gallery. "The 70's and Drawing in Paraguay" in the CCPA. Exhibition and Auction to benefit Neuropsychiatric Hospital of Asuncion in the Sepia Gallery. "Paraguayan Sculpture and ceramics " CCPA
1980	"Paraguayan Artists" at the Museo Brazilian House of São Paulo. "Ten graphic artists of Paraguay" in the halls of the OEA in Washington, D.C. (USA). "Retrospective 1966-1980" at CCPA. Individual shows in the Art-sans Gallery
1981	Collective exhibition at the City of Pirayú. "Paraguayan Artists" in the Paraguayan Center of Engineers. Shows individual in the Sepia Gallery and Solo exhibition at the Gallery Status.
1983	"The engravings of Jenaro Pindú" at the Art-sans Gallery

Ticio Escobar, the most important art critic in Paraguay, wrote about Pindú in 1983: "Today is already almost a truism to say that the 70's began with a predominance of drawing and the exhibition in the Gallery Pindú Miro may serve as the parameter and the beginning of that heyday… "

Livio Abramo, a master engraver, said: "... Pindú is one of the most capable artists of Paraguay-current, lyrical and dramatic at the same time-creating architectural structures laden with symbolism and transforming the human sense of latent, tight aggressiveness that comes from your subconscious in a world where his art, already solidly mature, provides us with an unexpected surprise and lyrical visions."

== Distinctions ==
He received, among other major awards, the following: "Honorable Mention" in the Visual Arts Competition ACFA (1966), "Second Prize" in the Story Contest organized by the newspaper La Tribuna (1973); "Award for Guest Honor" at the Second Biennial Maldonado (Uruguay) (1977) and" Grand Prix" at the Third Biennial Maldonado (1979)

== Works ==
Pindú has a large collection of ink drawings and engravings. Most of his works have no title and are in major museums Paraguay around the world and in private collections.

As an architect he designed both homes and commercial buildings that are both intrinsically works of art while retaining a distinct style and daring.
