= Mabel Arcondo =

- Born: Mabel Arcondo; 1940; Asunción, Paraguay
- Died: June 3, 1976 (aged 36); Asunción, Paraguay
- Education: Studied commercial art in Buenos Aires; mentored by Adán Kunos
- Known for: Painting
- Style: Dreamlike imagery, intense color, and surrealism
- Movement: Primitivism, Surrealism
- Partner: Ruben Milessi
- Children: Daniel Milessi

Mabel Arcondo (1940–1976) was a Paraguayan artist whose work is classified in the art history of Paraguay as being at the intersection between primitivism and surrealism. Her work was characterized by intense color and dream themes.

== Biography ==
Mabel Arcondo was born in Asunción, Paraguay, in 1940. At the age of 17, she contracted polio and became reliant on a wheelchair.

Mabel studied commercial art in Buenos Aires and learned the rudiments of painting from Adán Kunos in Asunción, but she was largely self-taught. Stylistically her work is complex, drawing on a dream-like quality which transforms reality in the manner of Chagall and using color schemes of fauvism, but with an original sense of melancholy, according to Ticio Escobar. Her paintings have strong use of color, good composition and a surrealistic quality.

In the 1960s and 1970s in Paraguay, there was a flowering of local painters including Arcondo, Carlos Colombino, Ricardo Migliorisi, Ignacio Núñez Soler, and Laura Márquez, who were able to capture in their works the culture of Paraguay. She began to exhibit her paintings in 1964 and has works in both private collections and the Museo Paraguayo de Arte Contemporáneo (The Paraguayan Museum of Contemporary Art). Arcondo's work was seen as revolutionary, on the cusp between primitivism and surrealism.

In the mid-1970s, Arconda began a relationship with the artist Ruben Milessi. Though doctors warned her that a pregnancy might jeopardize her health further, she gave birth to her only child, Daniel Milessi, on 3 June 1976. Soon after the birth, she died in Asunción.

She is considered one of the iconic painters of Paraguay. Her works are held and shown in numerous museum collections and in 2014 were part of a discussion and exhibit presented by the International Association of Art Critics Paraguay Chapter.

== Selected works ==
- "Perfíl de Mujer" (1961)
- "Casamiento Coyguá" (1974)
- "Las Picardías de un Cura Párroco" (1974)
- "Tranvía a la Casa de Gaudi" (1975)
