= Neural dust =

Nerve sensors used in brain-computer interfaces

Neural dust is a theoretical class of nanometer-sized devices operated as wirelessly powered nerve sensors; it would be a type of brain–computer interface. The sensors may be used to study, monitor, or control the nerves and muscles and to remotely monitor neural activity. In practice, a medical treatment could introduce thousands of neural dust devices into human brains. The term is derived from "smart dust", as the sensors used as neural dust may also be defined by this concept.

== Background ==
The design for neural dust was first proposed in a 2011 presentation by Jan Rabaey from the University of California, Berkeley Wireless Research Center and was subsequently demonstrated by graduate students in his lab. While the history of BCI begins with the invention of the electroencephalogram by Hans Berger in 1924, the term did not appear in scientific literature until the 1970s. The hallmark research of the field came from the University of California, Los Angeles (UCLA), following a research grant from the National Science Foundation.

While neural dust does fall under the category of BCI, it also could be used in the field of neuroprosthetics (also known as neural prosthetics). While the terms can sometimes be used interchangeably, the main difference is that while BCI generally interface neural activity directly to a computer, neuroprosthetics tend to connect activity in the central nervous system to a device meant to replace the function of a missing or impaired body part.

== Function ==
=== Components ===
The principal components of a neural dust system include the sensor nodes (neural dust), which aim to be in the 10-100 μm^{3} scale, and a sub-cranial interrogator, which would sit below the dura mater and would provide both power and a communication link to the neural dust.

Neural dust sensors could use a multitude of mechanisms for powering and communication, including traditional radio frequency (RF), as well as ultrasonics. An ultrasound based neural dust mote would consist of a pair of recording electrodes, a custom transistor, and a piezoelectric sensor. The piezoelectric crystal is capable of recording brain activity from the extracellular space, and converting it into an electrical signal.

=== Data and Power Transfer ===
While many forms of BCI exist, neural dust is in a class of its own due to its size and wireless capability. While electromagnetic waves (such as radio frequencies) can be used to interact with neural dust or other wireless neural sensors, the use of ultrasound offers reduced attenuation in the tissue. This results in higher implantation depths (and therefore easier communication with the sub-cranial communicator), as well as a reduction of energy being distributed into the body's tissues due to scattering or absorption. This excess energy would take the form of heat, which could cause damage to the surrounding tissue if temperatures rose too high. Theoretically, ultrasound would allow smaller sensor nodes, allowing for sizes less than 100 μm, however, many practical and scalability challenges remain.

==== Backscatter Communication ====
Due to the extremely small size of the neural dust sensors, it would be impractical and nearly impossible to create a functional transmitter in the sensor itself. Thus backscatter communication, adopted from radio frequency identification (RFID) technologies, could be employed. In RFID passive, battery-less tags are capable of absorbing and reflecting radio frequency (RF) energy when in close proximity to a RF interrogator, which is a device that transmits RF energy. As they reflect the RF energy back to the interrogator, they are capable of modulating the frequency, and in doing so, encoding information. Neural dust would employ this method by having the sub-dural communicator send out a pulse (either RF or ultrasound) that is then reflected by the neural dust sensors.

While neural dust could use a traditional amplifier to sense action potentials, in the case of an ultrasound based neural dust sensor, a piezoelectric crystal can also be used to measure from its location in the extracellular space. The ultrasound energy reflected back to the interrogator would be modulated in a way that would communicate the recorded activity. In one proposed model of the neural dust sensor, the transistor model allowed for a method of separating between local field potentials and action potential "spikes", which would allow for a greatly diversified wealth of data acquirable from the recordings.

== Clinical and health applications ==
=== Neural prosthetics ===
Some examples of neural prostheses include cochlear implants that can aid in restoring hearing, artificial silicon retina microchips that have shown to be effective in treating retinal degeneration from retinitis pigmentosa, and even motor prostheses that could offer the capability for movement in those affected with quadriplegia or disorders like amyotrophic lateral sclerosis. The use of neural dust in conjunction with motor prostheses could allow for a much finer control of movement.

=== Electrostimulation ===
While methods of electrical stimulation of nerves and brain tissue have already been employed for some time, the size and wireless nature of neural dust could allow for advancement in clinical applications of the technique. Importantly, because traditional methods of neurostimulation and certain forms of nerve stimulation such as spinal cord stimulation use implanted electrodes that remain connected to wires, the risk of infection and scarring is high. While these risks are not a factor in the use of neural dust, the challenge of applying sufficient electrical current to the sensor node, is still present.

==== Sleep apnea ====
Electrostimulation devices have already shown some efficacy in treating Obstructive Sleep Apnea (OSA). Researchers that used a surgically implanted electrostimulation device on patients with severe OSA found significant improvement over a 12-month period of treatment with the device. Stimulation of the phrenic nerve has also been shown to be effective in reducing central sleep apnea.

==== Bladder control in paraplegics ====
Electrical stimulation devices have been effective in allowing spinal cord injury patients to have improved ability to urinate and defecate by using radio-linked implants to stimulate the sacral anterior root area of the spine

=== Epilepsy ===
Electrical stimulation therapy in patients with epilepsy has been a well established procedure for some time, being traced back to as early as the 1950s. A paramount goal of the American Epilepsy Society is the continued development of automated brain electrical stimulation (also known as contingent, or closed loop stimulation), which provides seizure-halting electrical stimulation based on brain patterns that indicate a seizure is about to happen. This provides a much better treatment of the disorder than stimulation that is based on an estimate of when the seizure might occur. While vagal nerve stimulation is often a target area for treatment of epileptic seizures, there has been research into the efficacy of stimulation in the hippocampus, thalamus, and subthalamic nucleus. Closed-loop cortical neuromodulation has also been investigated as a treatment technique for Parkinson's disease
