= Olga Blinder =

Paraguayan painter, engraver and sculptor

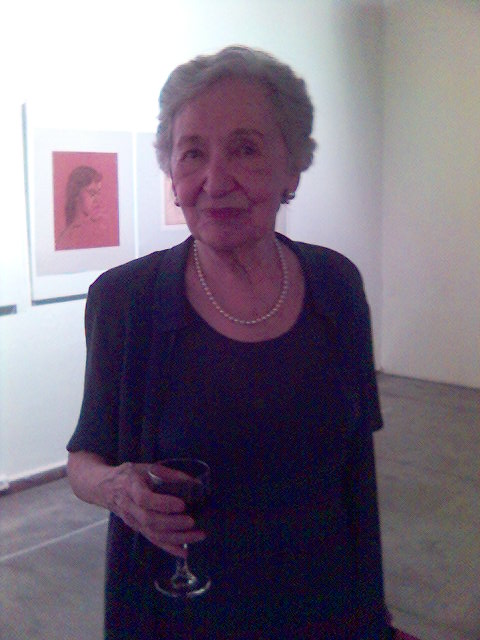
- Born: 21 December 1921; Asunción, Paraguay
- Died: 19 July 2008 (age 87)
- Known for: Painting, engraving, woodcuts, sculpture
- Spouse: Dr. Isaac Schvartzman

Olga Blinder (1921 in Asunción, Paraguay – 19 July 2008) was a Paraguayan painter, engraver and sculptor. Blinder was born in Asunción into a Jewish family. She lived through the Chaco War, World War II, the 1947 Paraguayan Civil War, in addition to Paraguay's coup d'états in 1954 and 1989. Blinder was also a licensed professor who taught arts and creative education for over 30 years. Her works include numerous published books and articles on education and art. She is the former director of the Escolinha de Arte of Paraguay in the Brazilian Cultural Mission and of the Instituto de Arte (ISA) of the National University of Asunción. She was also an advisor to the Ministry of Education for the development of textbooks. In addition, she has been recognized by both the League of Women's Rights and the Brazilian government, and received the Integración Latinoamericana award from the Ministry of Culture and Education of Argentina. Blinder is considered one of the key promoters of change within the 1950s Paraguayan art scene.

== Personal life ==
Olga Blinder was born into a Jewish family in Asunción, Paraguay. As a child, her father was supportive of her art passion allowing her to draw and enrolling her in art classes. She lived during a time of political strife and upheaval that heavily influenced her view of the world and of society. At university she studied engineering and pedagogy at the Paraguay Atheneum. In 1943, Blinder married Dr. Isaac Schvartzman. The couple had three children named Silvia Susana, Carlos Eduardo, and Jorge Bernardo.

== Education ==
She studied engineering at the Paraguay Atheneum from 1939 to 1943 and graduated in pedagogy. She attended a painting course at the Paraguayan University in 1948. In addition to her artwork, she also became a licensed professor that focused on creative education and art for the thirty years that she taught.

== Career ==
Olga Blinder studied painting with João Rossi and Ofelia Echagüe Vera, having her first exhibition in 1950 at the Ateneo Paraguayo, followed by an exhibition in 1952 at the Paraguayan-American Cultural Center. Some of her most notable work comes from the group she formed in 1954 called Grupo Arte Nuevo (New Art Group), alongside Josefina Plá, Lilí del Mónico, José Laterza Parodi, Edith Jiménez, Ruth Fisher and others. This unique group broke away from the naturalism that had dominated art during the 19th century, and instead turned towards expressionism. Central themes they emphasized include humanity and society. The group's aesthetic lacked unity but its art related to constructivist abstraction, stylizations of figuration, and social realism.

Working with Brazilian-born artist Livio Abramo, Blinder honed in on her technique of woodcut prints, an artistic medium that she was talented at. She was known as a fundamental promoter of change among the Paraguayan art circles. Blinder was particularly influential in the introduction of modernism to Paraguayan art during the 1950s and 1960s, turning to social realism as the foundation of her work. Her style was known for being expressive and containing hard, rigorous depictions of roughness, generally involving people as the central theme. A key component throughout Blinder's work was the depiction of women, usually rural and indigenous, partaking in everyday tasks of working and nurturing.

The 35-year dictatorship of General Alfredo Stroessner from 1954 to 1989 was also a central motivation for her artwork in which she sought out to denounce human rights abuses and depict the hardships everyday people were facing.

Throughout the 1960s Blinder utilized striking and simplified body forms in woodcut images as a central component of her artwork. By the 1970s Blinder became very involved in print media and made numerous engravings that were filled with intensity. In the 1980s she went back to expressionism as the central aspect of her paintings and her work became more introspective, still embodying themes of human nature and hardship.

During her lifetime she participated in a variety of international exhibitions in places such as Holland, Venezuela, Argentina, Spain, Chile, Lisbon, Colombia, Uruguay, and the United States. Blinder used portraits as a way of depicting the faces and bodies of those that were tortured. Her work as a whole was directed towards oppressive political regimes, and her artwork became a form of political resistance against the ways in which the government instilled fear among its people. In addition, her pieces recorded traumatic events that weren't documented by official records.

== Artwork ==
=== Pareja Triste, 1957 ===
One of her most famous pieces of art is her oil on burlap painting, Pareja Triste, completed in 1957. The painting depicts two individuals, yet their facial features seems to be mirror images of each other, both displaying a morose appearance with their eyes turned downwards and their mouths frowning. The individuals seem to be displaying some sort of immense grief that is shared between them, as seen with their overlapping bodies and the dark tones utilized in the painting. The dark blue and brown hues create a somber tone. The boundaries of the man and woman's body parts are so interwoven that it becomes difficult to distinguish who is who. The painting is said to show an interpersonal experience and shows the contextualization of psychopathology.

=== Miedo, 1959 ===
A prominent wood engraving of hers is Miedo [Fear], created in 1959. In the woodcut a mother figure seems to be shielding two children in her arms, protecting them from some sort of external force. Potentially, Blinder is illuminating the harsh reality of life for working class citizens and the hardship that the children are to face later on in life

=== Lavandera, 1961 ===
Another example of her woodcut art is her piece Lavandera, completed in 1961. In the woodwork a woman is portrayed to be diligently at work, scrubbing a garment against a washboard. The jagged angles of the woman's body and angular shapes present in the piece depict the harshness and tough nature of daily life as a worker. The piece is said to be influenced by the German expressionist, Lívio Abramo, whom she worked with during the time she created Lavandera.

=== Los Torturados, 1963 ===
Blinder has another famous series of woodcuts titled Los Torturados [The Tortured] (1963), in which employs two formats. The first is works where bodies are lined up and sometimes placed on top of each other and the second is works where the human body that is depicted is placed at the edge of the sheet. These two methods create a sense of suffering, confinement, and restriction that the imprisoned body experiences. She also depicted decomposing bodies where there were parts of bone, flesh, and fragments shown.

=== Madre, 1963 ===
Also created in 1963, Blinder created a woodcut on tissue paper called Madre. Fellow artist Livio Bramo said that Blinder's work was "profoundly preoccupied with the human condition, and in particular with human sadness." The block shape is very irregular and traces the woman's sloping shoulder and veiled head. There is extreme tension and duress in the child's outstretched hand, seeming to clutch at the woman for support, illuminating the bond of support and love between the two individuals. The piece is said to be representative of the financial struggle and poverty many families faced during Stroessner's dictatorship.

=== Inútil Espera, 1968 ===
In her piece Inútil Espera (Useless Wait), done in 1968, Blinder makes use of the female body by referencing a "semantic field that associates more universal aspects of female experience with the specific situation of Paraguayan women - waiting for companions in exile or for political change in the country." In this piece she also makes reference to the oppression everyday people faced during the dictatorship of Stroessner.

== Exhibitions ==
INDIVIDUAL:

- Asunción, 1952
- Asunción, 1956
- Asunción, 1959 (retrospective)
- Asunción, Brazilian Cultural Mission, (1972)
- Rosario, 1959
- Buenos Aires, 1962
- Rosario, 1966 / Madrid, 1969

COLLECTIVE:

- Asunción, 1951
- Asunción (First Feminine Hall) 1952
- Asunción (Second Feminine Hall) 1953
- San Pablo (Biennales) 1957, 1959, 1961, 1963
- Asunción (First Week of Modern Art) 1954
- Buenos Aires (first joint of Paraguayan art since 1934) 1954
- Asunción (Art fairs) 1961, 1962, 1963, 1964
- Tokyo (engraved Biennial) 1962 / Santiago (engraved Biennial) 1964
- Córdoba (II Hispano-American Biennial) 1964
- Buenos Aires (engraving, joint ) 1964
- Buenos Aires (jointly with Colombino) 1965
- Buenos Aires (jointly with Colombino and Josefina Plá) 1966
- Biennial of Coltejer, Medellín, Colombia, 1970
- Exhibition of Color Prints, New Jersey, United States, 1970
- II Biennial International Engravings of Buenos Aires, 1970
- Carpí (Italy) Exp. Of Contemporary Woodcut, 1972.

== Collections ==
- Escala: Essex Collection of Art From Latin America
- Museo Paraguayo de Arte Contemporáneo
- Museo de Arte Indígena
- Museum of Ceramics and Fine Arts Julian de La Herreria

== Honors and awards ==
- Plaqueta de Oro, Municipality of Córdoba: II Hispano-American Biennial 1964
- Decoration of the Order of the Baron of Rio Branco, Brazil, 1973
- Integración Latinoamericana Award

== Publications ==
- Arte Actual en Paraguay 1900-1980
- Olga Blinder
- 1956-1985 Comentarios
- Vistos Con Sus Ojos
- Antología Retrospectiva 1950-1990
