= Edith Jiménez =

- Born: July 16, 1918; Asunción, Paraguay
- Died: August 5, 2004 (aged 86); Asunción, Paraguay
- Occupations: Painter, engraver

Edith Jiménez (July 16, 1918 – August 5, 2004) was a Paraguayan plastic artist.

== Beginnings ==
She was born in Asunción on July 16, 1918 to Eulogio Jiménez and de Silvia González. She began her painting studies with the teacher Jaime Bestard in 1943. This exponent of the painting in his country taught her the use of composition and colour which she will later use in her paintings.

In 1952 she had her first individual painting exposition in the Agustin Barrios Gallery in the "Centro Cultural Paraguayo Americano". A year later she was nominated the official representative in painting in the second Biennial in São Paulo and participated in the organized sample of the historic revolutionary group of Paraguayan plastic "Arte Nuevo" in Palma Street, in the centre of Asunción.

She evolved with her artistic production and continued with the presentations of her works to the audience participating in numerous collective samples in Asunción, São Paulo, Buenos Aires, Caracas, Montevideo and in country sides of Paraguay.

In 1956 she began her engraved studies in the Brazilian Cultural Mission with the teacher Livio Abramo. In 1958 she received a scholarship from Brazil government to study engraving in São Paulo, in the Modern Art Museum and in the "Gravura" studio, always under de directions of Livio Abramo. It was only a one-year scholarship but it extended to three. In 1959 she had expositions in São Paulo and Asunción.

== Trajectory ==
Year	Outstanding activity
1960	She got a gold medal in the first Latin-American Xylography competition which took place in Buenos Aires, Argentina. She started working as an engraving teacher in the Brazilian Study Centre, in Asunción, task which she practically performed until her death in 2004.
1961	She had an exposition in the fifth Biennial of São Paulo, getting the Mention of Honour and a silver plaque and then in the international Biennial in Tokyo, Japan.
1963	She had an exposition in the sixth Biennial of São Paulo, where she got the Mention of Honour and a silver plaque for the second time. She received a Mention of Honour in the first American engraving Biennial in Santiago.
1964	She began her abstract painting experience. With this she got the Kennedy award instated by the Paraguayan American Cultural Centre.
1965	She participated in the foundation of the Modern Art Museum of Asunción, she had an exposition in the eighth Biennial of São Paulo and received and invitation of the state department to visit the US.
1970	She did an individual exposition in the Modern Art Museum in Rio de Janeiro and participated in the collective sample in the "American Colours Prints Society" of New Jersey (United States of America)
1971	She had an exposition in the ninth Biennial of São Paulo and in 1972 she participated in the International Xylography sample in Madrid. She was invited to participate in the artists group which works are part of the "Pinacoteca del Senado Federal" of Brasília, cultural institution that has twenty eight works of her.
1973	She did individual expositions in Asunción, São Paulo and Brasília. She intervened in the making of two thousand works realized by the Engraving Group of Brazil (NUGRASP) for an Estampa Club edition.
1974	She participated in the Engraving Biennial of San Juan Puerto Rico and in 1975 she got a special mention and a gold and silver plaque Engraving encounter of Cuenca del Plata and received the International award of the São Paulo Biennial, this may be the most important award that a Paraguayan plastic artist has ever won.
1976	She did an engraving and painting exposition in the Arte-Sanos gallery of Asunción she exposed engravings in the Graphus gallery of São Paulo. She presented paintings in the Arte-Sanos gallery and exposed in the fifth exposition of the Art Association of Toyonaka (Japan).
1978	She participated in the Paraguayan engraving sample which took place in San José, Costa Rica, she exposed again in Arte-Sanos and participated in the sample of "images and messages of Latin American" in Villeparisis (France).
1979	She exposed in the first Triennial of engraving in Buenos Aires, in the "Sala de los Premiados de la XV Biennial Internacional" of São Paulo and again in Arte-Sanos, of Asunción..
1980	She exposed with the New Art Group in the Agustín Barrios gallery of the Paraguayan American Cultural Centre, she participated in the "Paraguayan Artists" sample organized by the State Government of São Paulo in the Brazilian House Museum of the capital, in the "Paraguayan Graphic" organized by the OEA in Washington, and in the collective samples of Christmas cards organized by the "Casa Taller" gallery in Asunción.
1981	She did an engraving exposition in "Casa Taller", participated in the Cultural Foundation Curitiba (Brazil), and in the 25 years of engraving in Paraguay exposition in the Brazilian Study Centre in Asunción.
1984	She participated in the Paraguayan Artist exposition in the Centenario Club in Asunción, and exposed in the Grand Palais of Paris in an organized sample by the "Societé des Artistes Français" (France).
1986	She participated in the collective sample "dead nature", in the Magister gallery in Asunción. Realized an individual sample in Arte-Sanos, presented the "Edith Jiménez, estudiante" exposition in the Fábrica Gallery in Asunción, and participated in the Biennials of Cali (Colombia) and de San Juan in Puerto Rico.
1987	Exponed in the "Viejo Galpón" and "Siddartha" galleries of San Bernardino, and in Duchan (Germany). In 1988 realized an abstract engraving sample in the Michele Malingue Gallery in Asunción.
1989	She presented an oleo sample in the Arte Sanos gallery, and participated of a collective sample in the Magister gallery in Asunción. In 1990 she presented the "La nueva pintura de Edith Jiménez" exposition in the Michele Malingue Gallery.

Josefina Plá writes : “Edith, today’s and yesterdays painter, engraver since a long time and always, continues her career cover by her pride, in her labour she gives it all, in which, remaining true to herself, can offer us something new in her sample”. And Livio Abramo: “ If we don’t find that unity of style in these series of painting, characteristic in Edith paintings, we find, on the other side, a really notable wealth of solutions and we belief the announcement of new ambitious goals. Dangerous and unknown roads….but fascinant.

As you can see, the expositions that she offered in the country and in many parts of the World positions her as the most important Paraguayan Plastic Artist in the 20th century, all of that added to the fact that her work has reached the highest recognitions and that her pieces are part of collections like the modern art museum in New York, the Estampa museum in Buenos Aires, the National Library of Paris, the Smith College Museum of the United States and the most important museums in Paraguay.

== Last years ==
Short time before his death and for the initiative of the plastic artist Luis Alberto Boh, it was declared by the "Junta Municipal" of Asunción as the "Dialect daughter in Asunción" with the great sculpture Hermann Guggiari.

He died on October 7, 2004, when he was eighty six years old. Receiving the public recognition for his humanistic and artistic gifts.
