= Modesto Delgado Rodas =

Paraguayan painter and educator(c.1880–1963)

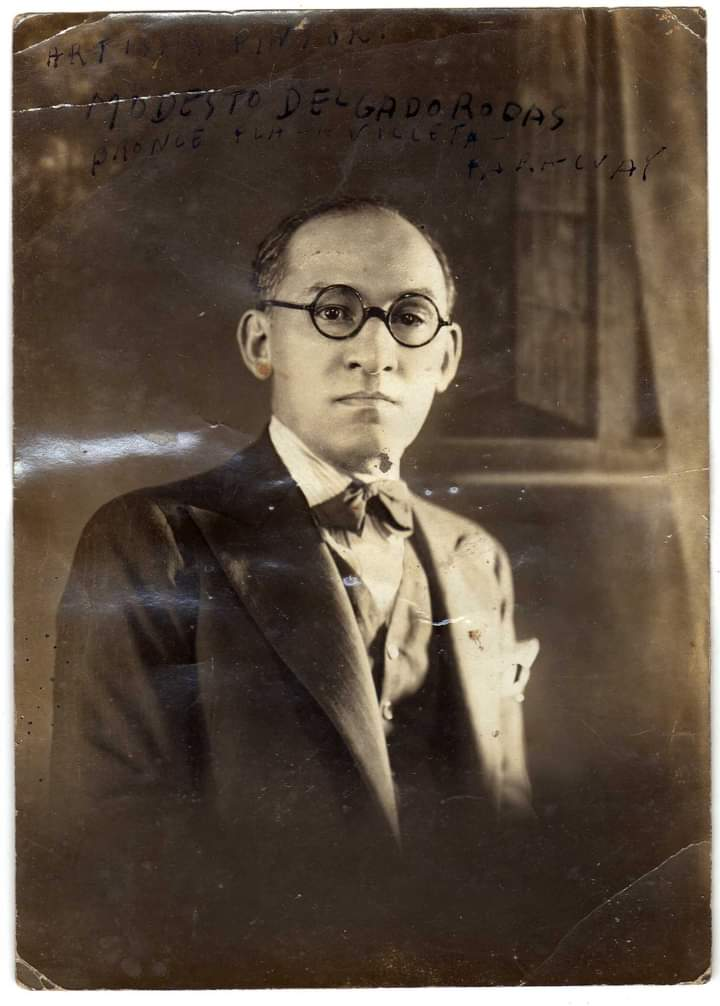
- Delgado c. 1920
- Born: 2 October c. 1880; Villeta, Paraguay
- Died: 14 May 1963 (aged 82–83); Villeta, Paraguay
- Cause of death: Suicide
- Education: Academia Nacional de Bellas Artes, 1907; Brera Academy
- Occupations: Painter; educator
- Spouse: Marietta Vicario (m. 1924)
- Children: 1

Modesto Delgado Rodas (2 October c. 1880 – 14 May 1963) was a Paraguayan painter and educator. Delgado was known for his nudes, a rarity in Paraguay during the period, as well as his landscapes and portraits.

== Early life and education ==
Delgado was born 2 October c. 1880 (Note: Also cited as 1886 and 1887.) in Villeta, Paraguay to Daniel Delgado and Eugenia Rodas. One of five brothers, Delgado was the brother of the sculptor Salvador Delgado Rodas.

Delgado was educated at Colegio Nacional de la Capital and at the Paraguayan Gymnasium (Spanish: Gimnasio Paraguay) where he studied painting and drawing under Eduardo Sívori and Juan A. Samudio. In 1903, Delgado held his first exhibition in Asunción.

In the early 1900s, Delgado travelled to Buenos Aires where he studied under Eduardo Sívori at the Academia Nacional de Bellas Artes. Returning to Paraguay in 1907, Delgado was awarded a scholarship to study in Rome in 1913. Delgado studied drawing, painting, and decorative arts at an unnamed academy in Rome, as well as the Brera Academy in Milan. During this period Delgado met and married the painter Marietta Vicario.

== Career ==
In the 1920s, Delgado and Vicario settled in Detroit where he taught drawing and Spanish. Delgado exhibited in Washington, D.C. in 1926 and 1928. The family later returned to Paraguay and settled in Villeta however, Vicario soon returned to the United States with their daughter. Delgado continued to exhibited in the United States with an exhibition in Baltimore in 1930, and in Cincinnati in 1931.

In Villeta, Delgado began teaching and is known to have taught the painter and educator Ofelia Echagüe Vera. From 1933 to 1935, Delgado participated in the Salón de Primavera. Delgado as known for his nudes, which the art critic Josefina Plá stated that he was the only Paraguayan artist to regularly paint nudes during the first half of the 20th century. Delgado was also known for his landscapes and portraits.

== Personal life ==
In 1924, Delgado married Marietta Vicario, an American painter, with whom he had one daughter.

On 14 May 1963 Delgado died by suicide at his parents' house in Villeta, aged between 82 and 83.
