= Ricardo Migliorisi =

Paraguayan artist and architect (1948–2019)

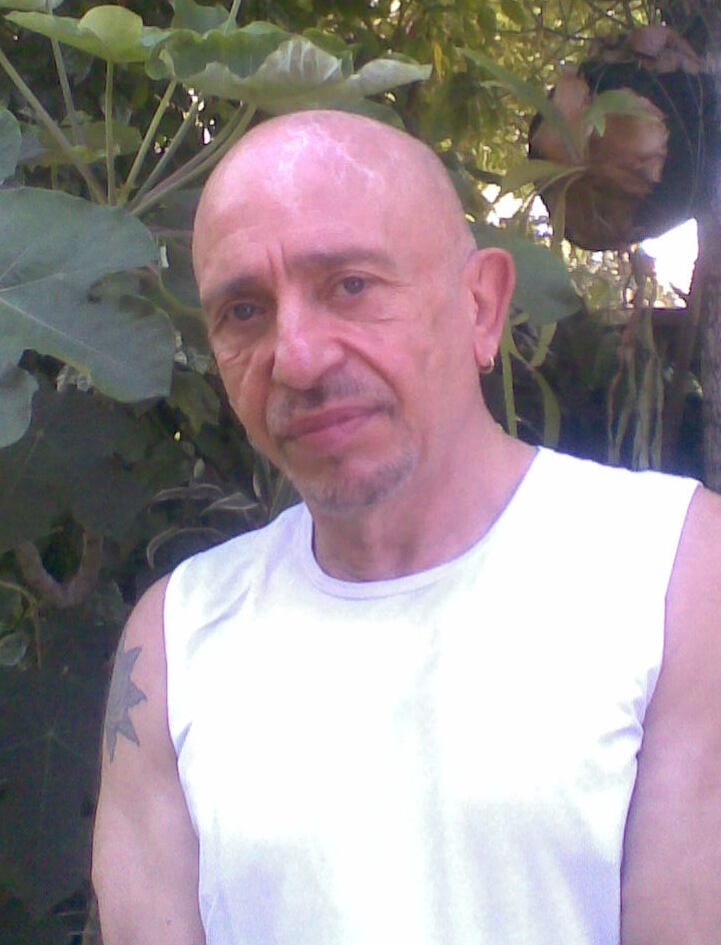
- Migliorisi c. 2008
- Born: 6 January 1948; Asunción, Paraguay
- Died: 14 June 2019 (aged 71)
- Known for: Painting, architecture
- Notable work: "La Carpilla Sixtina", "Los Durmientes"
- Awards: 1st Premio de Afiches (Prize of Posters), C.I.M.E., United Nations 2nd Premio BIenal del Papel (Prize Biennial of Paper), Buenos Aires

Ricardo Migliorisi (6 January 1948 – 14 June 2019) was a Paraguayan painter, costume designer, scenery designer and architect. Migliorisi won national and international awards. Migliorisi showed his work in many countries including the United States and Europe.

== Early life ==
Ricardo Migliorisi was born in Asunción on 6 January 1948, to Isolina Salsa Ferraris and Salvador Migliorisi Tumino, of Italian origin. He did his elementary studies at the Dante Aliglieri School and later on, at San José School, in Asunción. His liking for the aesthetics and art were manifested at a young age. His first artistic expressions were carried out when he was eighteen years old.

When he was still young. he studied Plastic Arts in the Cira Moscarda Studio. In that studio many young people could give free hand to their creativity, expressed with unedited elements.

Ricardo also studied engraving with the expert Livio Abramo, but basically he can be considered autodidactic. Later on, he studied Architecture in the Universidad Nacional de Asunción (National University of Asunción).

In the following years of his formation as an artist he gained much experience in many Latin-American countries, working as a wardrobe and scenery designer. In the beginning he used drawing and painting in most of his work, but later included different other types of elements to his creations. In a short period of time, the young artist showed the world an innovator, psychedelic and delirious style in his work.

== Career ==
Ricardo Migliorisi emerged in the Paraguayan artistic scene in the mid-1960s, a time marked by the rise of Modernism and a period of transformation and openness across the Americas and Europe.

A multidisciplinary artist, Migliorisi left a significant artistic legacy that spans painting, illustration, sculpture, muralism, theater, and dance. His work often explored themes of fantasy, imagination, spectacle, and the right to difference—an important element of modern and contemporary human identity. Known for his vibrant and eclectic style, Migliorisi blended various media, techniques, and disciplines to construct a personal and distinctive universe.

He is widely regarded as one of the most important artists in Paraguay. In one of his well-known reflections on art, he encouraged aspiring artists: “Que no abandonen el arte. Que sigan adelante con el sueño que los impulsa. No hay nada mejor que sentirse realizado en la vida.” (“Don’t abandon art. Keep moving forward with the dream that drives you. There is nothing better than feeling fulfilled in life.”)

He has had numerous opportunities to show his work:

| Year | Individual expositions |
|---|---|
| 1974 | "Sobre Monstruos y Víctimas" ("About monsters and victims"), Zea Museum, Medellín, Colombia |
| 1978/1992 | Arte-Sanos Gallery, Asunción, Paraguay |
| 1985 | "Pequeños Pizarrones" ("Little blackboards"), Fábrica Gallery, Asunción, Paraguay |
| 1986 | Retrospectiva "20 años de obra de R. Migliorisi", ("20 years of R. Migliorisi's work") Retrospective, Visual Arts Center, Asunción, Paraguay |
| 1989 | "Birgitta Von Scharkoppen en el Jardín de las Delicias", ("Birgitta Von Scharkoppen in the Garden of Delights"), Miraflores Cultural Center, Lima, Peru |
| 1990 | "Bañistas año 79 D.C." ("Bathers year 79 D.C."), Arte-Sanos Gallery, Asunción, Paraguay "Los Últimos días de Pompeya" ("Pompeya's last years"), The Gallery, Lima, Peru |
| 1991 | "Los Últimos días de Pompeya" ("Pompeya's last years"), Italian Latin-American Institute, Rome, Italy |
| 1992 | "La Carpilla Sixtina" (The Sistine Chapel"), Rond-Point Gallery, Paris, France |
| 1994 | Maison Tonet Gallery, Graz, Austria Art Collectors Miami, U.S. "Los Durmientes" ("The sleepers"), Miraflores Cultural Center, Lima, Peru |
| 1995 | Recoleta Cultural Center, Buenos Aires, Argentina |
| 1996 | "La Culpa" ("The Guilt"), Praxis Gallery, Lima, Peru Artesanos Art Galery. U.S.A. |
| 1998 | Praxis Gallery, Lima, Peru Muestra Antológica. Manzana de la Rivera. Asunción. Paraguay (Anthological Sample. Manzana de la Rivera. Asunción. Paraguay) Exposición en el Museo del Barro a partir de la publicación de un libro de dibujos suyos “Trazos, trozos y laberintos” (Exposition in the Mud Museum, with motive of the publication of his book of drawings “Sketches, pieces and labyrinths”) |
| 1999 | De La Matriz Gallery, Montevideo, Uruguay. |
| 2000 | Muestra "La vía dolorosa" (Sample “The painful road"), Gallery Phanta Rei, Spain |
| 2001 | Sample of drawings, Gallery Phanta Rei, Spain |
| 2002 | Praxis Gallery, Lima, Peru |

Also, collective expositions with contemporary artists:

| Year | Collective expositions |
| 1968 | Interamerican Biennial, Medellín, Colombia International Sample of the Graphics, Florence, Italy |
| 1976 | Today's Art in Iberoamerica, Madrid, Spain |
| 1979 | Engraving Biennial, San Juan, Puerto Rico Drawing Biennial, Maldonado, Uruguay. |
| 1981 | São Paulo's International Biennial, Brasil. |
| 1982 | Engraving Biennial, Noruega |
| 1986 | Biennial of Cali, Colombia; 1st Biennial of Cuenca, Ecuador. |
| 1988 | "Tres Artistas Paraguayos" ("Three Paraguayan Artists"), Praxis Gallery, Lima, Peru "Dos Artistas Paraguayos" ("Two Paraguayan Artists"), Contemporaneous Art Museum, Maldonado, Uruguay |
| 1989 | Special Guest in the Biennial of Cuenca, Ecuador |
| 1990 | "Latinarca 90", Montreal, Canada "Arte del Sur del Mundo" ("Art from the South of the World"), Marsala, Italy "Paraguay Ra'angá", Alcalá de Henares, Spain |
| 1991 | "Tres Jóvenes Maestros Latinoamericanos" ("Three Young Latin-American Masters"), Galería Praxis, Lima, Peru "Pintores de hoy en América Latina" ("Today's painters in Latin America"), Nagoya, Japan "Ana Eckell y Ricardo Migliorisi", Park Galiery, Boca Ratón, Florida, United States; "Ocho Artistas Paraguayós", Museo de las Américas, Washington D.C., United States |
| 1992 | Exposición del Stand Paraguayo de la Expo-Sevilla 92; "Al encuentro de los otros", Kassel, Germany |
| 1993 | "Arte del Mercosur ", Buenos Aires, Argentina; "Artistas Paraguayos", Galería Centoira, Buenos Aires, Argentina. |
| 1994 | V Bienal de La Habana, Cuba; Dibujo Paraguayo, Corriente Alterna, Lima, Peru; Ludwid Forun, Aachen, Alemania. |

== Awards ==
During his career he received many awards.

| Year | Awards |
| 1972 | First Place. Posters C.I.M.E. United Nations |
| 1982 | First Place. "Benson & Hedges" Contest. Asunción. "The 12 of the Year". Caracol Network. Asunción. |
| 1986 | Second Place. Biennial of Paper. Buenos Aires, Argentina. |
| 1992 | Best Artist of the Year. Radio Curupayty. Asunción. |

== Museums and collections ==
His artistic production traveled numerous exposition rooms. Some of them are:

- Contemporary Arts Museum. Madrid, Spain.
- Modern Arts Museum. National University of Bogotá, Colombia.
- Gabriel Turbay Library. Bucaramanga, Colombia.
- Museum of Zea. Medellín, Colombia.
- Coltejer Collection. Medellín, Colombia.
- Culture House. Cúcuta, Colombia.
- Paraguayan Museum of Contemporary Arts. Asunción, Paraguay.
- "The Sistine Tent". Visual Arts Center. Asunción, Paraguay.
- Contemporary Arts Museum. Maldonado, Uruguay.
- José Luís Cuevas Museum. Mexico.
- Private collections in Spain, USA, Venezuela, Uruguay, Argentina, Mexico, Italy, Brazil, Peru, Sweden, Japan, Honduras, El Salvador, Colombia, France, Ecuador, Chile, Netherlands, Germany and Paraguay.

== Style ==
A variety of expressive resources, paintings, montages, audio-visual experiences and installations are part of his work.

His characters are considered none too realistic, and may represent popular Latin-American subjects, animals and classic mythology, opera, circus and cabaret characters, the television and socialite, all of them with crazy tendencies.

Migliorisi presents a scenic sense that connects his work to theatrical spaces. His characters often feature masks and elements of stage lighting. His use of color is a distinct characteristic, where he uses contrast, transparencies, and textures on mud or metal objects. His work also features imposing plaster figures, feathers, glass pearls, golden stones, and shells.

== Personal life ==
His family, of Italian descent, lives in Asunción. He has a sister: María Cristina Migliorisi de Galiano.

Migliorisi was hospitalized in May 2019 under intensive therapy. He died on 14 June 2019, at the age of 71.
