= Ultrasound energy =

Type of mechanical energy characterized by vibrating particles in a medium

Ultrasound energy, simply known as ultrasound, is a type of mechanical energy called sound characterized by vibrating or moving particles within a medium. Ultrasound is distinguished by vibrations with a frequency greater than 20,000 Hz, compared to audible sounds that humans typically hear with frequencies between 20 and 20,000 Hz. Ultrasound energy requires matter or a medium with particles to vibrate to conduct or propagate its energy. The energy generally travels through most mediums in the form of a wave in which particles are deformed or displaced by the energy then reestablished after the energy passes. Types of waves include shear, surface, and longitudinal waves with the latter being one of the most common used in biological applications. The characteristics of the traveling ultrasound energy greatly depend on the medium that it is traveling through. While ultrasound waves propagate through a medium, the amplitude of the wave is continually reduced or weakened with the distance it travels. This is known as attenuation and is due to the scattering or deflecting of energy signals as the wave propagates and the conversion of some of the energy to heat energy within the medium. A medium that changes the mechanical energy from the vibrations of the ultrasound energy into thermal or heat energy is called viscoelastic. The properties of ultrasound waves traveling through the medium of biological tissues has been extensively studied in recent years and implemented into many important medical tools.

== Common medical applications of ultrasound energy ==
=== Diagnostic imaging ===
As stated above, properties of ultrasound energy traveling through biological tissues has been extensively studied in recent years. The attenuation due to scattering of energy in different tissues can be measured by a device called a transducer. Recorded information from transducers such as the relationship to the site of origin and intensity of the signal can then be put together to form images of what lies inside the target tissues. Higher frequency ultrasound waves generally produce higher resolution images, but attenuation also increases as frequency increases which restricts imaging depth. Consequently, the best frequency has been determined for each type of diagnostic test and body tissue. Some of the more common ultrasound tests include A-scans, M-scans, B-scans, and Doppler techniques. These test produce images ranging from one-dimensional images to moving, real-time two –dimensional images that can often be seen immediately on a screen.

The advent of ultrasound technology has completely changed the medical diagnostic field due to its non-invasive characteristic. Medical professionals can now observe tissues within the body without having to physically enter the body. This reduces the amount of invasive and risky diagnostic procedures and increases the chances of a correct diagnosis. Some common medical imaging procedures include:

- Sonogram - Ultrasound images of an unborn fetus are used to check for proper development and other characteristics.
- Tumor/cancer diagnosis - Images can be used to examine suspicious masses found inside the body and determine if other treatment is necessary.
- Blood flow - Images can be used to examine the flow of blood through specific vessels and examine if there is any blockage or abnormalities.
- Internal organs - Images can be used to look at the physical shape and movements of internal organs to insure they are working properly.
- Intravascular decompression bubbles

=== Oncology treatment ===
One characteristic of ultrasound previously discussed is that of attenuation of an ultrasound signal partly due to the conversion of mechanical wave energy to thermal energy. Researchers and doctors have made medical applications to harness this heat conversion and use it in successful medical procedures. Ultrasound energy is a form of therapy being studied as an anticancer treatment. Intensified ultrasound energy can be directed at cancer cells to heat them and kill them. Recent testing has shown that ultrasound can increase the effectiveness of cancer treatments such as chemotherapy and radiation therapy. This procedure is known as heat or hyperthermia therapy. By using the converted heat energy that ultrasound provides, specific diseased tissues can be heated often to temperatures around 41° to 45 °C. This increase in temperature has been linked to improved effectiveness of cancer treatment due to dilation of blood vessels and increased oxygen presence in affected tissues.

Another new treatment called high intensity focused ultrasound (HIFU) takes advantage of the thermal energy characteristics of ultrasound. HIFU uses an ultrasound device that is able to precisely focus ultrasound waves at a target tissue or specific group of cells. At the focus of this ultrasound energy, the temperature can reach excesses of 80 °C which results in nearly spontaneous coagulative necrosis or cell death without harming neighboring cells. This treatment greatly expands the ability of doctors to be able to destroy cancer cells noninvasively. Currently, many test are being carried out to determine the effectiveness of the treatment on different tissues, but testing has already shown promising results in the field of prostate cancer.

=== Phacoemulsification ===
Phacoemulsification is a cataract surgery method in which the internal lens of the eye which has developed a cataract is emulsified with the tip of an ultrasonic handpiece and aspirated from the eye. Aspirated fluids are replaced with irrigation of balanced salt solution to maintain the volume of the anterior chamber during the procedure. This procedure minimises the incision size and reduces the recovery time and risk of surgery induced astigmatism. It is best suited to relatively soft cataracts, where the ultrasonic energy required is moderate.

== Sources ==
- "Heat Therapy", American Cancer Society, Inc, 3 July 2011. Retrieved 14 November 2012.
- Hussey, Matthew, PhD "Physics of Ultrasound" in Diagnostic Ultrasound. New York: John Wiley and Sons, 1975. 12–46.
- Kennedy, J E; ter Haar, G R; Cranston, D (September 2003). "High intensity focused ultrasound: surgery of the future?". The British Journal of Radiology. 76 (909): 590–599. doi:10.1259/bjr/17150274. PMID 14500272.
- Lutz, Harald T. (2006). "Basics of Ultrasound". Manual of Diagnostic Ultrasound in Infectious Tropical Diseases. pp. 1–19. doi:10.1007/3-540-29950-5_1. ISBN 978-3-540-29950-9 – via Google Books.
- Moran, Michael J., Howard N. Shapiro, Daisie D. Boettner, and Margaret B. Bailey. "Energy and the First Law of Thermodynamics" in Fundamentals of Engineering Thermodynamics, 7th ed., New York: Wiley, 2011, page 55.
- Nave, Carl, "Audible Sound", HyperPhysics, Georgia State University, 2012. Retrieved 14 November 2012.
- "Ultrasound" in Bronzino, Joseph D. (ed) Medical Devices and Systems, 3rd ed. Boca Raton, Florida: CRC/Taylor & Francis, 2006. 14-1-4-40. The Biomedical Engineering Handbook.
