= Lilí del Mónico =

Swiss artist

- Born: 1910; Switzerland
- Died: February 7, 2002 (aged 91–92); Asunción, Paraguay
- Known for: artist

Lilí del Mónico (1910 – February 7, 2002) was a Swiss artist active in Paraguay in the 1950s.

== Early life and early career ==
Lilí del Mónico was born in Switzerland in 1910. In 1948, she began taking painting lessons in oil painting at Lausanne, Switzerland with Professor David Burner and in Asunción with Jaime Bestard.

In 1952, she held her first solo exhibition in the Paraguayan American Cultural Center (CCPA). She participated in the Women's Hall of Fine Arts at the Union Club, both institutions of the Paraguayan capital.

== Trajectory ==
The year 1954 was crucial to work out the later Paraguayan visual arts. Lilí del Mónico performed with the New Art Group the first Art Exhibition of Modern Art in Asunción in the windows of stores and shops on the street Palma, the main avenue of the capital down town.

That same year, the group formed by Josefina Plá, Jose Parodi Laterza and Olga Blinder presented an exposition in Buenos Aires in the Argentine Society of Plastic Artists.

This artist had since the beginning of her career intense participation in the cultural life of Paraguay. In 1960 she took part in several group exhibitions in Asunción. In 1967 she made her second individual sample in the Kennedy Gallery. In 1968 he won the Gold Medal at the exhibition organized by the Society of Horticulture & Garden of Asunción.

Also, in the years 1972, 1974, 1980 she organized solo exhibitions in the Paraguayan American Cultural Center. In 1975, she participated in the sample group "Women in Paraguayan plastic." In 1976 she exhibited in the Colonial Bookshop Gallery in Punta del Este, Uruguay. In 1980 she showed her oil paintings in an exhibit at the same individual Uruguayan seaside resort. In 1988 Lilí del Mónico exhibited in the Factory Gallery and made a show of paintings at the Gallery of Art-sans of Asunción. She also could show her work in her homeland. So she took some pictures in which she focused on the female body to her country.

== "Consistency internal" ==
In the catalog for the presentation “Art-Sans” her colleague from the movement "Arte Nuevo" and friend Olga Blinder wrote:" Lilí was looking for her way and her findings were not accidental. The force is always constant inside her and, although her production is not constant and is governed by a line or technical issue, the strength of her paintings rely on their authenticity, which makes her paint the way she speaks and acts in her daily life. Lilí is like that, weather people like her or not and, therefore, her paintings reflected the same force that always pushed her, in all her endeavors.

== Plastic reflections ==
As an exercise in reflection on her work and the path she walked by the group "New Art", Lilí del Mónico wrote the book "Between brush and reeds" this material was edited in Asunción in 1990 and then translated into Italian.

Lilí del Mónico also had another little-known facet: of the industry. He was at the controls of the sugar mills "Censi and Pirota S. A. ", in Benjamin Aceval in Paraguayan Chaco. She was remembered as the first industrial woman of Paraguay.

Lilí del Mónico died in Asunción on February 7, 2002.

== Collections ==
The works of Lilí del Mónico are in the collection of the Museum of Contemporary Paraguayan Art Asunción and in private collections in Paraguay, Argentina, Uruguay, the United States, Venezuela, Spain and Switzerland.
