= Josefina Plá =

Spanish-Paraguayan poet

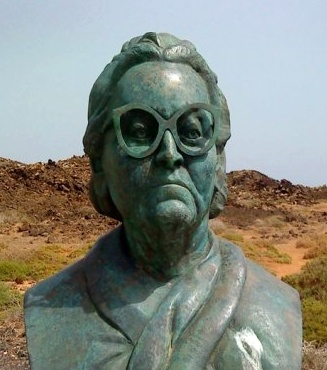
- Statue of Josefina Plá on Isla de Lobos, Canarias, Spain
- Born: Maria Josefina Teodora Plá Guerra Galvany; 9 November 1903; Isla de Lobos, Canarias, Spain
- Died: 11 January 1999 (aged 95); Asunción, Paraguay
- Movement: Impresionist
- Spouse: Julián de la Herrería

External media

Images
- "Josefina Pla and Jose Laterza sculpture, 1963" National Museum of American History

Audio
- Paraguayan poet and writer Josefina Plá reading from her work, Library of Congress, 1984.

Video
- "Encuentro con Josefina Plá" (In Spanish), April 13, 2018, TV rupive Canal educativo MEC Paraguay

María Josefina Teodora Plá Guerra Galvany (9 November 1903 – 11 January 1999) was a Spanish-born Paraguayan poet, playwright, journalist, art critic, sculptor, ceramicist, and historian. She has been described as "the most influential woman in Paraguayan cultural matters in the twentieth century."

She received numerous awards and distinctions for her artistic and literary work, for defending human rights and the equality between men and women.

== Personal life ==
Maria Josefina Teodora Plá Guerra Galvany, known as Josefina Plá, was born on 9 November 1903, in Lobos Island, Canary Islands, Spain, where her father kept a lighthouse. Plá was the first born in a family of seven to Raraela Guerra Galvany and Leopoldo Plá Botelho.

She started to write at very young age of four and before seven she was already writing poetry, at ten she was writing short stories and drama at twelve. In 1923 Plá published anonymously her first poetry to a journal which her father liked not knowing it was hers. In 1925, Plá presented her writings in the youth magazine, Speaker of the Writers' Generation of Paraguayan Postmodernism.

In 1924, while on vacation with her family in Villajoyosa, Alicante, Plá met the Paraguayan sculptor Andres Campos Cervera, who signed his work Julián de la Herrería. He was in Spain to study ceramics, just days from completing his course of study and returning to Paraguay. In spite of this separation, twenty months later he asked Plá's father for permission to marry her. The ceremony was performed on 17 December 1926. In 1927, Plá settled in Paraguay with her husband, and established herself in Villa Aurelia and Asunción.

Plá and her husband returned twice to Spain, the first time to exhibit their ceramics works in a Madrid exhibition in 1931. They departed Paraguay for their second visit on 17 October 1934. Julián de la Herrería died in Valencia, Spain in 1937. Plá came back to Paraguay a year later. She had a son, Ariel de Asís.

Plá died on 11 January 1999 in Asunción.

== Artistic career ==
Plá's sculpture and ceramic work has been described as providing an archive of the cultural history of Paraguay. Her work has been exhibited widely throughout South America. Some of the murals and mosaics she created still can be viewed on the buildings of Asunción. Some of her pottery is exhibited in the foyer of Centro Cultural de España Juan de Salazar in Asunción. She was a member of the Ateneo Paraguayo.

In the 1950s, she co-founded the New Art Group (Grupo Arte Nuevo) along with fellow artists including Olga Blinder, Lilí del Mónico and José Laterza Parodi. The article she wrote in 1952 for an exhibition catalog for Olga Blinder is considered a manifesto of modern art in Paraguay, and a pioneering step toward the group's creation. In 1959, in response to the Exposición de Obras del Museo de Arte Moderno de San Pablo, Plá again discussed artistic modernization in two long newspaper articles. She placed the exhibition in the context of the local art scene, and critically considered the selection of artworks.

== Literary career ==
Plá was considered one of the vanguardista school of poetry, along with Hérib Campos Cervera, nephew of her husband.

"Living the other one that I am that wasn't what would have been.

Living what would have been dying which I am still not.

Sleeping all was I, another waking I go."

Nos habremos deseado tanto / que el beso habrá muerto. Desnudo día, 1936
We will have wanted each other so bad / that the kiss will have died. Naked day, 1936

Her written work covers the field of literary creation – more than forty titles in poetry, narrative and theatre, the social and cultural history of Paraguay, the ceramic, painting and critic, by whom she is considered the highest, fundamental referent in the Paraguayan Cultural Subject in the last century. She frequently collaborated with Roque Centurión Miranda in writing many of her plays, particularly from 1942.

Year	Works
1934	"The price of dreams"
1960	"The rooth and dawn"
1965	"Faces in the water" "Death invention"
1966	"Dark Satelites"
1968	"The dust in love" "Naked day"
1975	"Black light"
1927–1977	"Poetic Anthology"
1982	"Time foliage", "Time and darkness"
1984	"Changing dreams for shadows".
1985	"The flame and sand". "The thirty thousand absents".
1996	"The imposible absent"

Her dramatic production includes, from 1927 until 1974, "Víctima propiciatoria", "Episodios chaqueños" (with Roque Centurión Miranda), "Porasy" (opera script with music of Otakar Platil), "Desheredado", "La hora de Caín", "Aquí no ha pasado nada", "Un sobre en blanco", "María inmaculada", "Pater familias" (all with Roque Centurión Miranda), "La humana impaciente", "Fiesta en el río", "El edificio", "De mí que no del tiempo", "El pretendiente inesperado", "Historia de un número", "Esta es la casa que Juana construyó", "La cocina de las sombras", "El professor", "El pan del avaro", "El rey que rabió" y "El hombre de oro" (the last three, are children pieces), "La tercera huella dactilar", "Media docena de grotescos brevísimos", "Las ocho sobre el mar", "Hermano Francisco", "Momentos estelares de la mujer (short pieces series)", "Don Quijote y los Galeotes", "El hombre en la cruz", and "El empleo" y "Alcestes".

Her work about cultural and social Paraguayan history includes the following titles: "La cultura paraguaya y el libro", "Literatura paraguaya del siglo XX", "Apuntes para una historia de la cultura paraguaya", "Arte actual en el Paraguay", "Cuatro siglos de teatro en el Paraguay", "Impacto de la cultura de las reducciones en lo nacional", "Apuntes para una aproximación a la imaginería paraguaya", "El Templo de Yaguarón", "El barroco hispano-guaraní", "Las artesanías en el Paraguay", "Ñandutí. Encrucijada de dos mundos", "El espíritu del fuego", "El libro en la época colonial", "Bilingüismo y tercera lengua en el Paraguay", "Españoles en la cultura del Paraguay", "La mujer en la plástica paraguaya" and "The British in Paraguay, 1850 - 1870" (translated by B.C. McDermot) y "Hermano Negro. La Esclavitud en el Paraguay".

== Awards ==
Throughout her life, she received several awards, ribbons and awards nominations, including: The Lady of Honour of the Order of Isabel la Católica (1977); a member of the International Ceramic Academy in Geneva, Switzerland; the founding member of the PEN Paraguayan Club; the "Ollantay" trophy to the theatre investigation of Venezuela (1984); the "woman of the year" in (1977); the Bicentenary Medal of the United States of America (1976); the condition of Counsel of the Vice Minister of the Paraguayan Culture; the National Order of Merit in the commendatory grade of the Paraguayan Government in (1994); her Human Rights defense recognition given by the International Society of Jurists; the Beautiful Arts Gold Medal of Spain (1995), the Johann Gottfried von Herder Medal; member of the Paraguayan Linguistic Academy of Paraguayan and Spanish history; finalist of the Merit Contest for the "Príncipe de Asturias" award (1981); the postulation for the "Cervantes award", top recognition for the Hispanic letters in the years 1989 and 1994; and the "Ciudadanía Honoraria" given by the Paraguayan Parliament in 1998.
