= Jenaro de Urrutia Olaran =

Spanish painter

Jenaro de Urrutia Olaran was a painter born in Plencia/Plentzia in 1893 and who died in Bilbao on January 2, 1965 (both in Biscay, Spain). He studied at the School of Arts and Crafts in Bilbao, later going on to study in Paris and Rome, which were funded through scholarships from the Regional Government of Vizcaya. Mainly known by his mural paintings, landscapes and scenes of local customs of the places he dwelled in.

He was president of the Asociación de Artistas Vascos (Basque Artists' Association) between 1926 and 1929.

His murals can still be seen at St Joseph's Church in Baracaldo, at the Good Shepherd's in Lutxana-Barakaldo and in St Marina's of Bilbao. The Bilbao Fine Arts Museum and Vitoria Fine Arts Museum of Vitoria also host works by Jenaro de Urrutia.

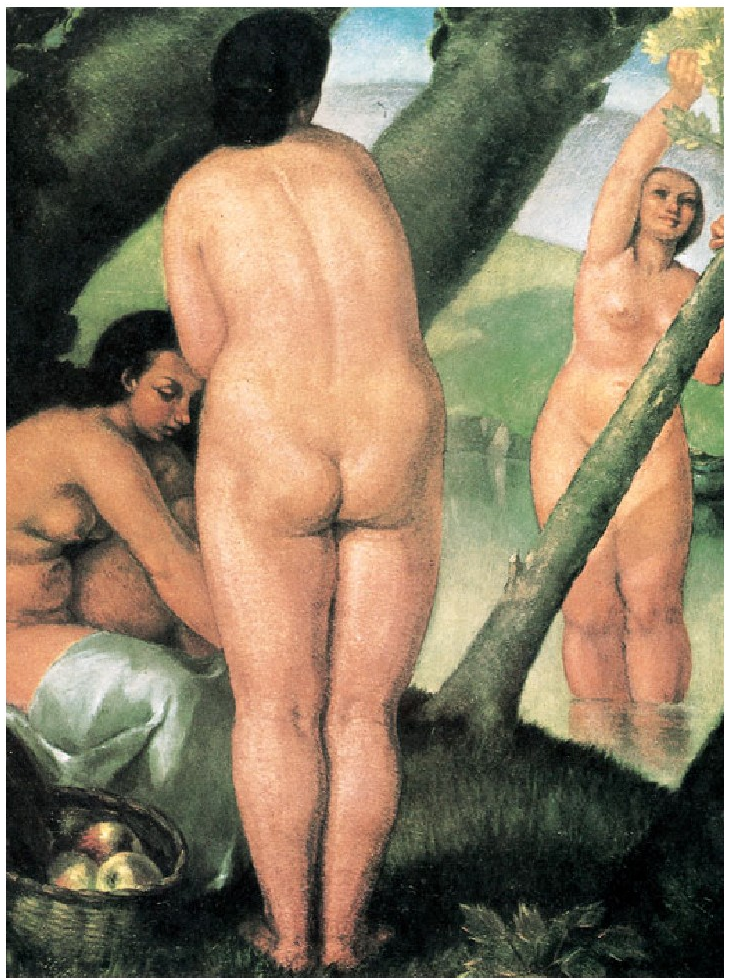
Banistas Jenaro Urrutia

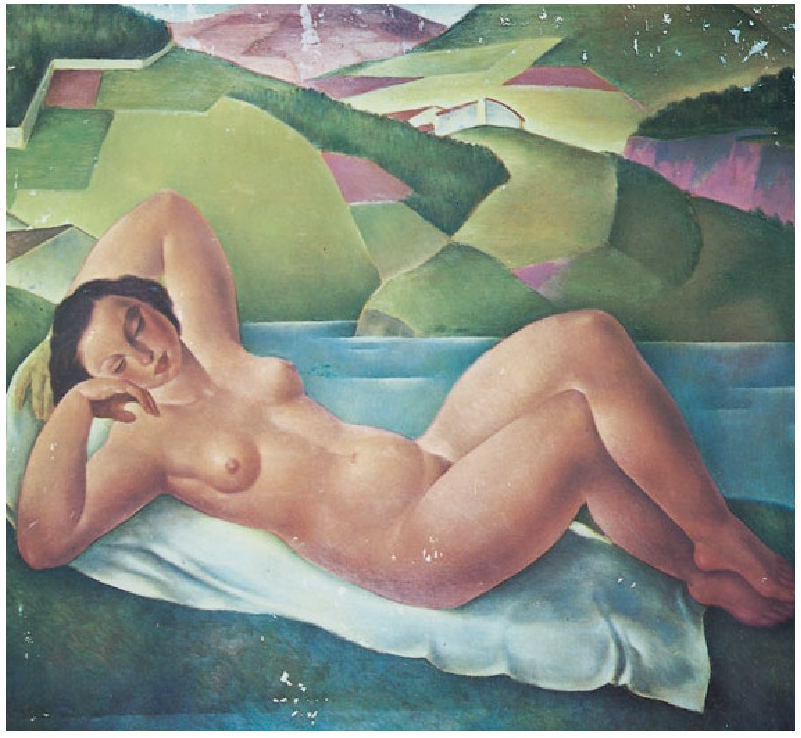
Desnudo Jenaro Urrutia
