= Pedro Di Lascio =

Paraguayan painter and engraver

Pedro Di Lascio (1900–1978) was a Paraguayan painter and engraver.

== Collections ==
Works by Peter Di Lascio can be seen at the Museo Julián de la Herrería and the Centro de Artes Visuales of the Museo del Barro, both in Asunción; in the Braniff collection selected by the University of Texas, United States; at the Instituto Ítalo Latinoamericano, Rome; at the Museo de Cultura Hispánica in Madrid; at the Museo de Arte Hispano Americano in Montevideo, Uruguay; and in private collections in the United States, Spain, France, Italy, Argentina, Germany, Brazil and Paraguay.

== Sources ==
- Diccionario Biográfico Forjadores del Paraguay, 1st edition 2000. Distribuidora Quevedo de Ediciones. Buenos Aires, Argentina
- Josefina Pla, Obras Comletas I: Historia Cultural - Arte Actual in el Paraguay (online version: Biblioteca Virtual del Paraguay)
