= Hermann Guggiari =

- Born: Hermann Bruno Guggiari; March 20, 1924; Asunción, Paraguay
- Died: January 1, 2012 (aged 87)
- Occupations: Engineer, sculptor

Hermann Guggiari (20 March 1924 – 1 January 2012) was a Paraguayan engineer and sculptor.

== Childhood and youth ==
Guggiari was born in Asunción, Paraguay the son of Ana Brun and Pedro Bruno Guggiari, considered by many the most remarkable among the mayors of Asunción. He completed his elementary and high school education in the San Jose School of Asunción and his engineering studies in Buenos Aires where he also graduated as a sculptor at the Escuela Superior de Bellas Artes "Ernesto de la Cárcova", coming into contact with artists Libero Badii, Alicia Peñalba, Lucio Fontana and Curatella Manes and learning to value the avant-garde movements of the time.

After the bloody civil war of 1947-1954 in Paraguay, Guggiari's liberal and democratic ideas gained him exile, cultural margination and imprisonment on several occasions, during the thirty-year dictatorship of Alfredo Stroessner.

The lack of an official national art fair in Paraguay led him to create the Bosque de los artistas, in his own property, a fair which opened every Christmas from 1970 to 1995 becoming a Must of artistic creators, reaching a participation of 250 artists in the last editions.

== History and works ==
Guggiari's body of work is large and has won prizes. Some have freedom as the central theme: Hungria o Libertad, which received a special mention in the V Bienal of São Paulo (1959); Kennedy, which obtained the first prize in sculpture in the Salon Esso of Young Artist of Latin America, organized by the OEA (1965): Rejas, inspired in the prisons of the Stronist dictatorship; NNUU, a seven meters structure, which is located at the entrance of the Dachau concentration camp (Germany) and symbolizes the United Nations in a form near the building of the NNUU, with perforations as wounds in two fronts-United Nations as a name, because the violence of the world continues-and as a sign of hope in each hole of the violence, a nest of real pigeons as a murmur of peace (199).

Another theme is the vital, between to be and stop being. In this line there is Parto, with a message of transcendence despite the pain, Inmanencia, and Del polvo eres y polvo seras.

As a homage to the dreams that did not come true, what could not be, he carved Ara rupi a about which Livio Abramo said once at the presentation: "Because of the capacity of adapting is deep artistic sensibility to the spirit of this time, Hermann B. Guggiari has a special place in the plastic art of Paraguay and the continent. His art is complex, absorbing all technical possibilities of our culture and civilization and he fuses them as his instrument in order to express the fundamental values of men."

Brote, an homage to his father, mayor of the city of Asunción who planted trees and created the green spaces of the city, is a sculpture inscribed within his optimistic themes. Historia, presented at the Expo 92 in Sevilla, was selected by the organizers of the world event to be exposed at the entrance of the Pabellon de las Americas. His moral theme appeared in his Cristo, whose original is at the entrance of the church La Crucecita, in the Sajonia neighborhood, in Asunción. A copy of this work was presented at the X Bienal of São Paulo (1971) and obtained the Golden Medal; regarding this successful participation the critic Arnold Kohler, from Switzerland, said in the newspaper Tribune de Geneve: "There are two artist in the Bienal of Sao Paulo, both sculptors, who having followed different steps, one figurative and the other abstract, have reached a high perfection and spirituality. The first one, Hermann Guggiari, Paraguayan-created a form of an angel emerging from the wall, a dramatic and sublime work."

He is also the author of other Cristos, associated to the ecological area, such as the one in the temple of Maria Auxiliadora, of Asunción, and the Cristo clavado por los troncos quemados, of the few remaining woods in Paraguay. Within this subject, he made in the streets, in the second Bienal of Medellín (Colombia), the Cross of Medellín, as an homage to the Colombian Christian martyrs. Another Cruz ametrallada made as an homage to the Christian country men of the agro leagues, murdered during the dictatorship of Stroessner. Proceso deserves special mention atemporal multispatial, with an integration of films, photos, sound, made with machine guns and used several times as Cruz.

On sustained development he presented in the university city of Hays, Kansas, United States, a sculpture symbolizing the development of this state as the world granary. (1980)

Gaviota (1982) is a sculpture presented in Punta del Este (Uruguay) in a mixed exposition of sculptors of Latin America, in the Playa Brava; it's a protest against the death of the coast birds due to the black ties produced by the petrol pollution.

He also made a monument to Periodista martir Santiago Leguizamon (1991), located on the street with the name of the press man, victim of murder bullets. In 1994 he made a Homenaje a Miro in an international congress in Panama.

Other sculptures of his are monument to A los heroes del CHACO in the harbour of Asunción, the image of Maria Auxiliadora, of 8.5 meters, made in stainless steel, and the monument of Exalumnos del Colegio San Jose muertos en la Guerra del Chaco, made in quebracho wood.

He was a member of various international juries, co-founder of Centro de Arte Moderno de Asunción, founder and first president of the Centro de Escultores del Paraguay, founder of the Movimiento Ecologico Paraguayo (1990). In 1995 he was condecorated by the Paraguayan government with "the national merit order", as a Commendatore. He was married to Deidamia Banks, was the father of eight children, four of whom keep the family spark of love to beauty in the center Guggiari Arte.
