= Daisie Boettner =

American mechanical engineer

Daisie Dawson Boettner (née Wheeler) is an American mechanical engineer, retired United States Army brigadier general, and professor emerita in the United States Military Academy. She is known for her coauthorship of the textbook Fundamentals of Engineering Thermodynamics and for her research on thermal energy storage, heat transfer, and fuel cells.

== Education and career ==
Boettner's father worked for Emerson Electric, and moved with his family, including Boettner, to Paris, Tennessee, where she grew up and was educated. After becoming valedictorian of her high school, she graduated from the United States Military Academy (West Point) in 1981, the first female graduate of West Point from Tennessee. She earned a master's degree from the University of Michigan, and completed a Ph.D. at Ohio State University in 2001.

In the Army, she initially served as a platoon leader in the 50th Ordnance Company. She moved to the 89th Ordnance Company, in Germany, from 1982 to 1985, and then became an ammunition and logistics officer for the 24th Infantry Division from 1986 to 1989, before being assigned to West Point as an instructor and assistant professor in 1991. From 1995 to 1998 she served in Hawaii as a support operations officer and ammunition plans officer, before returning again to West Point.

She became a professor there, in 2008, becoming the first female professor in mathematics, science, and engineering at West Point. She was chair of the department of civil and mechanical engineering before retiring in 2017 after 36 years of service. She was promoted to brigadier general on the occasion of her retirement.

== Recognition ==
Boettner was named as an ASME Fellow in 2017. In 2022, the American Society of Mechanical Engineers gave her their Kate Gleason Award, "honored for outstanding contributions as a mechanical engineer, military officer, role model, and mentor, and for the education development of students pursuing military and mechanical engineering careers".
