= Juan Max Boettner =

Paraguayan doctor and musician (1899–1958)

- Born: Juan Max Boettner; May 26, 1899; Asunción, Paraguay
- Died: July 3, 1958 (aged 59); Asunción, Paraguay
- Known for: Music, Medicine

Juan Max Boettner (May 26, 1899 – July 3, 1958), was a Paraguayan medical doctor and musical composer.

== Early life ==
Boettner was the son of Alfred Boettner (German) and María Victoria Gautier (French). At a young age, he was sent to Germany to pursue his primary and secondary school education. He studied medicine at the University of Jena, Hamburg, and later in Buenos Aires, where he graduated in 1926.

== Medicine ==
He started to practice medicine as a professor of Infectious Diseases in the Faculty of Medicine at Muñiz Hospital in Buenos Aires.

In 1929 he moved to Asunción, to dedicate himself fully to his specialty, Tuberculosis. At the time, that disease was a huge problem. It affected a big part of the population, plus there were only just a few drugs that could serve to treat it, and the use of X-rays was still very restricted.

The campaign against the tuberculosis had a great impulse with him in charge. In the beginning, he was the Director of the Tuberculosis Clinic. Later, he was the Director of the “Fight against Tuberculosis,” which became a new department in the Public Health Ministry.

He was a professor of the Faculty of Medicine of Asunción, teaching about Tuberculosis until 1941.

Short time after arriving in Paraguay, Doctor Boettner published several valuable studies about medicine. In 1930 he published his work about “Evolution of Tuberculosis”, “Study of the Vertebral Spine”, “Congenital Malformations of the Respiratory System”, “Respiratory Pathology”, “Manual about Tuberculosis” in 1939, “Silicosis in Paraguay”, “Greek and Latin Etymology for Medical uses” in 1945.

In 1945 he inaugurated the “Sanatorio Bella Vista” (Hospital Bella Vista), built by his own impulse and destined to the medical attention of people with pulmonary diseases. In this institution many renowned specialists in thorax surgery were educated. Today it is an important hospital located in the Venezuela Street, in Asunción and it’s named “Hospital Juan Max Boettner”.

He was founder and the first president of the Paraguayan Circle of Medical Doctors.

When the Chaco War started he presented himself and offered his services to the country. He was appointed 2nd Lieutenant and he took charge of the X-Ray Department in the Military Hospital of Asunción. He was also sent to Isla Poí, where he was promoted. Later he also served in the 2nd Body of the Army in Fortín Camacho, nowadays called Mariscal Estigarribia. In 1935 he became captain of the Health Department.

Justo Pastor Benítez, in 1947, recalls the names of Juan Max and Ricardo Boettner, both Medical Doctors as scientists of a new generation that stood out among others because of their work and the dedication to educate.

== Music ==
His name acquired even more importance when his first musical arrangements were known. As a great piano player and composer, he left many samples of his delicate interpretation of folkloric and also classical music. His musical work was rich in motivation. Among others, he composed in 1957 “Himno Nacional”, “Danzas Tradicionales del Paraguay” and “Música y músicos del Paraguay” and one didactic play called “Cómo reconocer el estilo y el autor de una obra musical”: “Fantasía esclava”, “Sinfonía en Mi Menor”, “El alma del inca”, “Yrendague”, “Sinfonía Paraguaya” and “Canciones folklóricas paraguayas”.

He was married with Gilda Vierci.

== Legacy ==
There is a street named after him in the neighborhood of Manorá, in Asunción. The street is parallel to the Aviadores del Chaco Avenue, it goes (north-east to south) from Felipe Molas Avenue to Papa Juan XXIII Street.
