= Julián de la Herrería =

Paraguayan painter, engraver, and ceramicist

Julián de la Herrería (3 May 1888, Asunción – 11 July 1937, Valencia) was a Paraguayan painter, engraver, and ceramicist. His birth name was Andrés Campos Cervera., but he signed his work Julián de la Herrería.
