= Ateneo Paraguayo =

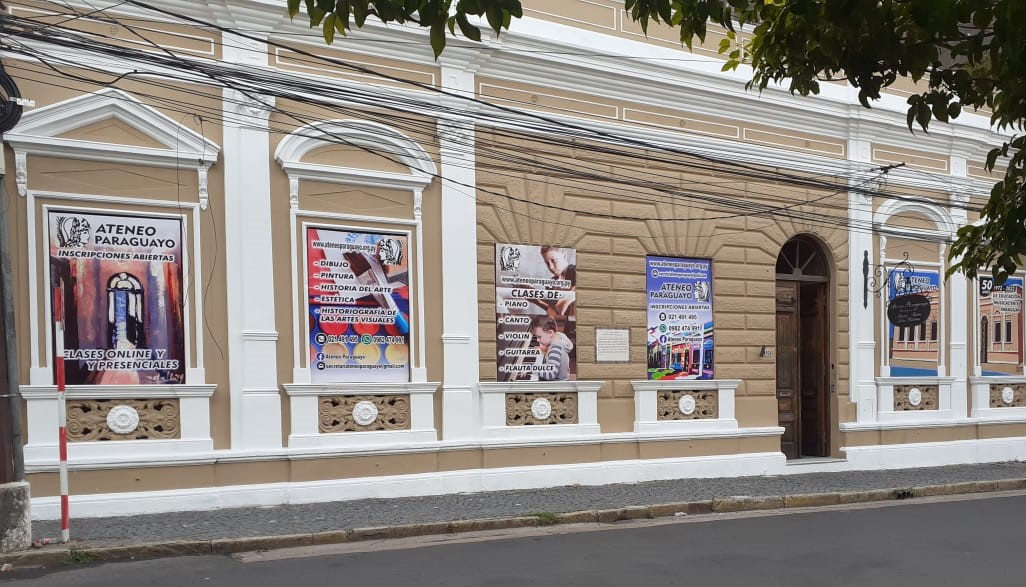
- Headquarters of the Ateneo Paraguayo in Asunción (January 2021).
- Established: July 28, 1883
- Location: Nuestra Señora de la Asunción 820; Barrio La Catedral, Asunción, Paraguay
- Coordinates: 25.2862251°S 57.6372222°W
- Director: Manuel Augusto Martínez Domínguez
- President: Álvaro Morel Aquino
- Website: www.ateneoparaguayo.org.py

The Ateneo Paraguayo is the oldest art and cultural institution in Paraguay, and one of the oldest in Hispanic America. Its headquarters are located in the microcenter of the city of Asunción, capital of the Republic of Paraguay, and it constitutes an important cultural heritage as well as a site of national tourist interest.

== History ==
The history of the Ateneo Paraguayo can be divided into three epochs or periods:

- The first period, or the period of the 19th-century Ateneo (1883-1889)
- The second period, or the period of the Paraguayan Institute and the Paraguayan Gymnasium (1895-1933)
- The third period, or the contemporary period (1934-present)

=== First period ===
The Paraguayan Ateneo was founded on July 28, 1883, during the government of Bernardino Caballero. Its founding document, handwritten by Cecilio Báez, was signed by Ramón Zubizarreta, Guillermo Stewart, Benjamín Aceval, Antonio Codas, Adolfo P. Carranza, J. Nicolás González, Alejandro Audivert, Braulio Artecona, Abdón Álvarez, Juan Martín Yañis, Gerónimo Pereira Cazal, Adolfo Decoud, Leopoldo Gómez de Terán, José Billordo, and Alfredo de Rocha Farías. According to the Paraguayan historian Carlos R. Centurión, the Ateneo had a mouthpiece, the Revista del Ateneo Paraguayo (Journal of the Paraguayan Ateneo), whose collection is not very large, as only two 19th-century publications are known. The institution dissolved in 1889 due to political disagreements among its members, although in that same year, the Universidad Nacional de Asunción was founded in its halls.

=== Second period ===
Following the model of the Institut de France, the Paraguayan Institute was founded in July 1895 as a reopening of the Ateneo. With sections for music, drawing, painting, gymnastics, and an important library, it became the most important cultural institution in Paraguay at the end of the 19th and beginning of the 20th centuries. The Revista del Instituto Paraguayo (Journal of the Paraguayan Institute) constitutes one of the most important publications in the country. Agustín Pio Barrios Mangore, José Asunción Flores, Juan Anselmo Samudio, Jaime Bestard, and Pablo Alborno, among others, passed through its classrooms.

Following the model of the German Gymnasium, a group of young people who had studied abroad founded the Paraguayan Gymnasium in 1913, achieving great preeminence from the late 1910s to the early 1930s.

=== Third period ===
In 1933, during the height of the Chaco War, the Paraguayan Gymnasium and the Paraguayan Institute merged under the name Paraguayan Ateneo.

Many of the most prominent figures in Paraguayan art have passed through the Ateneo. Currently, it is a center for musical pedagogical training and houses the Centro de Investigación Musical Juan Max Boettner, founded in 2018 (named after Juan Max Boettner). Its current president is Álvaro Morel Aquino, a pedagogue who introduced the Suzuki method to Paraguay.

== Bibliography ==
- Martínez Domínguez, Manuel Augusto (2023). Hacia una historia del Ateneo Paraguayo [Towards a history of the Paraguayan Ateneo] (in Spanish). Ateneo Paraguayo. ISBN 978-99989-911-0-1.
- Pérez Acosta, Juan Francisco (1959). Núcleos culturales del Paraguay contemporáneo, confraternidad y cultura [Cultural centers of contemporary Paraguay, fraternity and culture] (in Spanish). Libro de Edición Argentina.
