= Carlos Colombino =

Uruguayan equestrian (born 1938)

Personal information
- Full name: Carlos E. Colombino Frechou
- Born: 15 January 1938 (age 88) Montevideo, Uruguay

Sport
- Sport: Equestrian

Carlos E. Colombino Frechou (Note: In this Spanish name, the first or paternal surname is Colombino and the second or maternal family name is Frechou.) (born 15 January 1938) is a Uruguayan equestrian. He competed in two events at the 1960 Summer Olympics.
