= Ticio Escobar =

Paraguayan lawyer, art critic, curator, and museum director (born 1947)

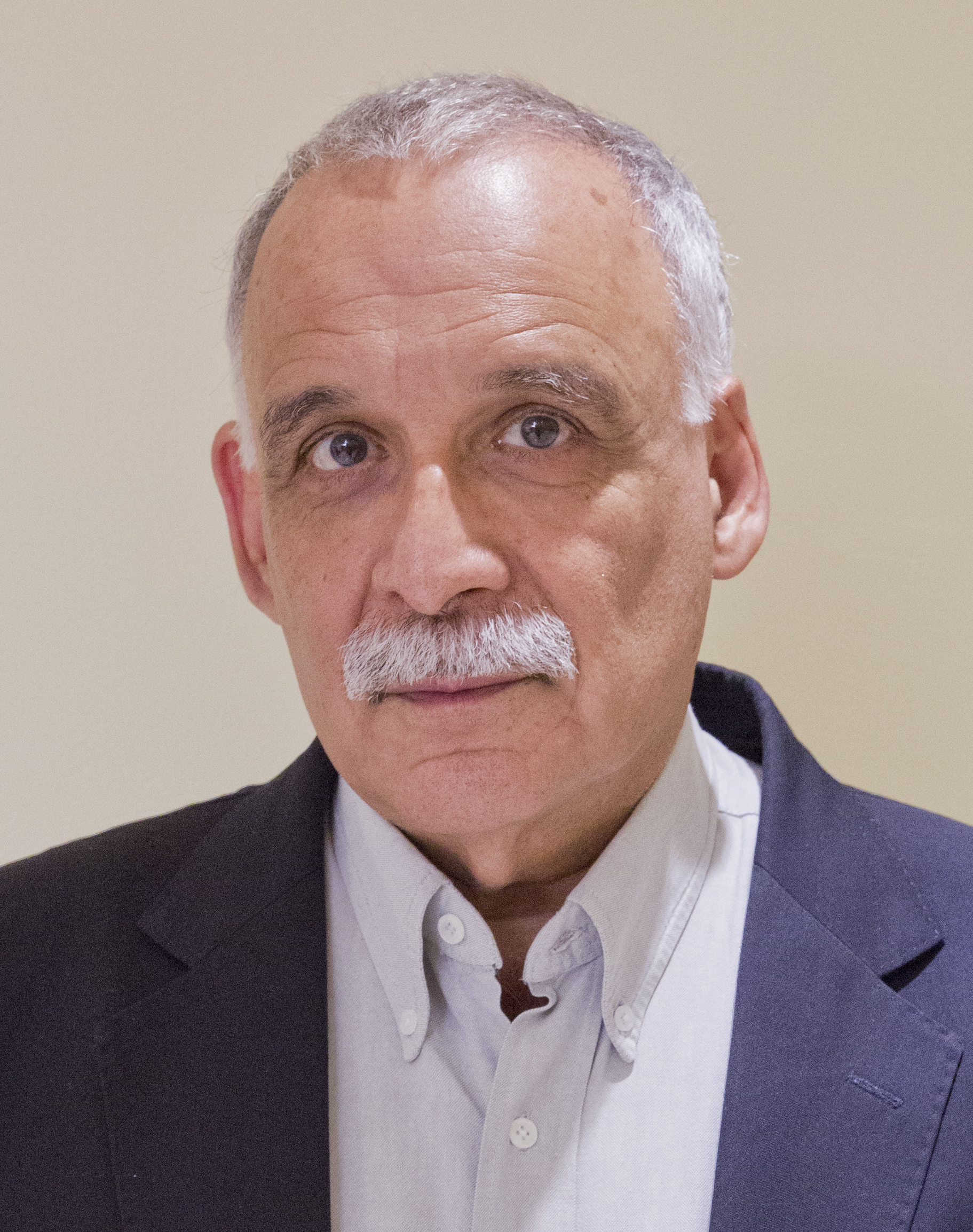
- Born: February 9, 1947 (age 79); Asunción, Paraguay
- Awards: Latin American Art Critic of the Year (1984), Guggenheim Foundation (1998), Prince Claus Award (1998), International Association of Art Critics Prize (2011)

Luis Manuel Escobar Argaña (born February 9, 1947), better known as Ticio Escobar, is a Paraguayan lawyer, academic, author, museum director, and former Minister of Culture of Paraguay. He has championed the rights of Indigenous peoples of Paraguay, writing about and curating shows on the topic.

== Early life and education ==
Escobar was born on February 9, 1947, in Asunción. His father was jurist Jorge H. Escobar, and his mother is María Rosalba Argaña Ferraro, sister of Luis María Argaña. He graduated in law at the Universidad Católica Nuestra Señora de la Asunción in 1970. Five years later, in 1974, he obtained his Master's degree (licencia) here in Philosophy. During his study, he was a member of the Comisión de Defensa de los Derechos Humanos en el Paraguay, a human rights group.

== Career ==
Escobar is also a curator, professor, cultural critic, and cultural promoter. He is the founder of the Museo de Arte Indígena of Paraguay and has served as president of the Asociación de Apoyo a las Comunidades Indígenas del Paraguay and the Paraguayan section of the International Association of Art Critics (AICA). He was Director of Culture of Asunción and served as Paraguay's Minister of Culture from 2008 to 2013.

He was the principal author of the National Culture Law of Paraguay and co-author of the National Heritage Law. Escobar has written extensively on art theory and cultural studies, including his recent publication Aura Latente (Tinta Limón, 2021).

Throughout his career, he has received numerous international awards and honors, including decorations from Argentina, Brazil, and France. In 2021, he was awarded an honorary doctorate (Doctorado Honoris Causa) by the Universidad Nacional de Rosario. In Spain, he received the Bartolomé de las Casas Award for his support of Indigenous causes in the Americas. He is currently the director of the Centro de Artes Visuales/Museo del Barro in Asunción.

== Academic career ==
Between 1971 and 1989, Escobar was a university professor in the fields of philosophy of law, mathematical logic, philosophical anthropology, history of art and art criticism.

Until 1980, he was an art reviewer for the Museo Paraguayo de Arte Contemporáneo. In 1979 he founded the Museo del Barro (museum of pottery) in Asunción, with the objective to preserve Paraguayan culture. The same year he also founded the Museo de Arte Indígena, Centro de Artes Visuales (museum for indigenous art, center of visual art). To this museum, of which he was also the director until 2008, he donated his own art collection.

== Arts and activism ==
Between 1978 and 1988, Escobar was the curator for Paraguay at the Biennale of São Paulo. Furthermore, he was curator for several versions of the Venice Biennale and the biennales of Cuenca, Trujillo, San Juan, Buenos Aires, Lima and Porto Alegre, and for a number of expositions in Latin America and Europe. At the beginning of the 1990s, he joined two movements for Indigenous peoples' rights: the Asociación Indigenista del Paraguay and the Asociación Apoyo a las Comunidades Indígenas del Paraguay (ACIP).

From 1991 to 1996 he was Director of Culture of the city of Asunción. In 1996 he won a national contest to edit a bill on culture, which was later adopted by parliament as Ley Escobar 3051/06. From 2008 to 2013 he was the Minister of Culture of the government of Fernando Lugo.

He was a chairman of the Paraguayan section of the International Association of Art Critics, and has written more than ten books.

== Recognitions ==
Escobar received several international awards, including:

- 1984: Latin American Art Critic of the Year, from the Argentinean department of the International Association of Art Critics
- 1991: Premio Sudamérica of the Centro de Estudios Históricos, Antropológicos y Sociales of Buenos Aires
- 1997: Commander in the Order of Rio Branco
- 1998: Scholarship of the Guggenheim Foundation
- 1998: Key to the city of Havana
- 1998: Prince Claus Award, Netherlands
- 2000: Basilio Uribe Prize of the Argentinean Association of Art Critics
- 2003: Honorary Professor of the Instituto Universitario Nacional de Arte (IUNA), Buenos Aires
- 2004: Bartolomé de las Casas Prize of the Casa de América, Madrid
- 2005: Order of May, Argentina
- 2009: Knight in the Ordre des Arts et des Lettres, France
- 2011: Prize for Distinguished Contribution to Art Criticism, International Association of Art Critics (AICA)
- 2013: Beloved Son of Asuncion Distinction, Asuncion, Paraguay
- 2015: Master of Art, Asuncion, Paraguay
