= Livio Abramo =

Brazilian artist (born 1903)

- Born: Livio Abramo; June 23, 1903; Araraquara, Brazil
- Died: April 26, 1992 (aged 88); Asunción, Paraguay
- Education: Self-taught
- Known for: Sketching, Engraving, Watercolors
- Notable work: Series such as *Obrero*, *Guerra civil española*, *Pelo Sertão*
- Style: Expressionism, Xylography
- Movement: Modern Art
- Children: Larissa Abramo
- Awards: Major engraving prize (1950)

Livio Abramo (June 23, 1903 – April 26, 1992) was a Brazilian-born Paraguayan sketcher, engraver, and aquarellist.

Abramo was born on June 23, 1903, in Araraquara, Brazil to Italian-Jewish parents of Sephardic background. He described his father as a liberal and his paternal grandfather as an anarchist. Although born in Brazil, he adopted Paraguay as his nation and it was in this country that he produced much of his work. He is considered to be "a key player in this development of Paraguayan modern art."

In his book Etapas de un itinerario: grabados, dibujos, acuarelas de Livio Abramo (Phases of an Itinerary: Engraves, Drawing and Aquarelles From Livio Abramo) Abramo claimed that his artistic skills were entirely autodidactic, and that many of his creations were inspired by his political views. Scholars consider him to be influenced by Oswaldo Goeldi and by German expressionists such as Käthe Kollwitz.

== Beginnings ==
After obtaining a major prize for his engravings in 1950, he travelled for almost two years in Europe, accompanied by his daughter Larissa. During this time he visited many European museums.

Abramo was a journalist for 33 years, and his political ideologies are expressed in his artistic work. He was very politically active; a trait which landed him in trouble on several occasions, with him spending some time in jail.

== Work ==
Abramo followed the studies of Brazilian nature, known as Itapecerica, Campos de Jordão (Fields of Jordao), and others. Following this, he created the series Obrero (Worker) and Guerra civil española (Spanish Civil War). Years later, he produced the xylo-engrave series in 1948 to illustrate the book Pelo Sertão, written by Brazilian writer Alfonso Arinos.

== Career milestones ==
Following is a list of some important events during Abramo's career:

- 1951: Had a special room at the First Biennial of Modern Art of São Paulo; also had a special room at the sixth edition of the event.
- 1956: Provided an individual exposition to the Modern Arts Museum of Río de Janeiro, and another at São Paulo.
- 1956: First visit to Paraguay
- 1957: Founded the Taller de Grabado Julián de la Herrería (Julián de la Herrería Engraving Workshop) in Asunción.
- 1960: Along with engraver María Bonomi, founded the Estudio Gravura at São Paulo.
- 1964: Moved permanently to Asunción, where he worked training Paraguayan artists.
- 1976: Made an introspective show at the São Paulo Biennial.
- 1978: Invited to repeat his previous retrospective by the Modern Arts Museum of Río de Janeiro.
- 1983: Made an exposition in the Cultural Center of São Paulo.
- 1990: The Lasar Segall Museum organizes a retrospective of his work.

== Legacy ==
On April 26, 1992, a few months before turning 89 years old, he died in Asunción. Abramo was admired for his extraordinary humility, kindness, the integrity and clarity of his thoughts, and the thorough approach he employed in the training of many other artists. He was considered to be one of the renovators of the xylographic language of the 20th century.

His engravings can be found at the British Museum of London, the Museum of the Vatican, the Museum of Modern Art, the Metropolitan Museum of New York City, the Riverside Museum, the Philadelphia Museum, The National Library of the Louvre in Paris, the Modern Arts Museums of São Paulo and Río de Janeiro, and the Visual Arts Center in Asunción, as well as in numerous private collections.

In February 2006, works by Livio Abramo and other Paraguayan artists were exhibited to celebrated the 50th anniversary of the founding of the Taller de Grabado Julián de la Herrería (Julián de la Herrería Engraving Workshop). In February 2007, Vanessa Tio-Groset and Jorge Codas paid tribute to his work in the multidisciplinary exhibition Festa ao ritmo da chuva at the Cultural Center of the Brazilian Embassy in Paraguay.
