= Antonio Ortiz Mayans =

Paraguayan writer and composer (1908–1995)

- Born: Antonio Ortiz Mayans; June 20, 1908; Asunción, Paraguay
- Died: May 7, 1995 (aged 87) Buenos Aires, Argentina
- Genre: Poetry
- Occupations: Composer, writer

Antonio Ortiz Mayans (June 20, 1908 – May 7, 1995) was a Paraguayan writer and composer.

== Life ==
He was born in Asunción, capital of the republic of Paraguay, on June 20, 1908, and according to his own words, his first work was the poem, "Los Amigos", published by the magazine of the Students Center of the Colegio Nacional de la Capital, where he studied and which had a publishing house called "Minerva", symbol of the Greek Culture.

He was an author and a composer who had an excellent academic formation, because he studied law at the university and got a degree in journalism as well, which helped him to be the corrector of proofs at La Razon newspaper for more than 18 years, and 7 at the La Nacion, from Buenos Aires. At the same time, he stood out as one of the creators of Paraguayan folk music, which he enriched with many songs such as Barrerita, Pasionaria and others.

At the age of 20 he published his first poem book, "Cuentos Nuevos", which introduced him to the literature field, A field to which he dedicated all the years of his life, writing many works that were happily received, such as "Zorazábal su vida y su Obra" or the first " Gran diccionario Castellano – Guaraní", which was greatly used in didactic, and which has overcome its tenths edition

His love for writing didn't stop and he made a profession out of it, once installed in the Argentinian capital city, where he lived most of his life, he got jobs which demonstrated his good preparation in this field, since he was the corrector of two of the most important written press outlets in Argentina, the newspapers La NACION and La RAZON.

Antonio Ortiz Mayans, died in Buenos Aires, on May 7, 1995, and due to his poetic works has been granted mentions in many countries such as: Uruguay, United States, Bolivia and Argentina, as a fair award for somebody who did a lot for the Paraguayan culture.

== New life ==
For many reasons, the exile of this author to the capital city of Plata was known in the 1930s, men of different cultures used to go to Buenos Aires.

In search of a better life and better working conditions. The intellectual colonies as well as the artists were many, among them were: Herib Campos Cervera, Eladio Martínez, Félix Pérez Cardozo, Agustin Barboza, Mauricio Cardozo Ocampo.

Ortiz Mayans was one of the founders of Sociedades Argentinas de Autores y Compositores (SADAIC)

Antonio Ortiz Mayans was not the exception and the previous facts surrounding the confrontation between Bolivia and Paraguay, such as the students’ manifestation in front of the government house, on October 23, 1931, which was cruelly repressed by the presidential guard, was one of the reasons of his going away from his country almost for ever.

After the facts on October 23, 1931, with the students of the Colegio Nacional de la Capital, in front of the government house, who demanded the president of the republic, José Patricio Guggiari, concrete actions to defend the chaco territory, always wanted by the Bolivians, which later derived in the massacre of many young students who were killed with machine guns in front of the government house, Antonio Ortiz Mayans had to go on exile to Argentina, where he lived for the rest of his life, developing in the neighboring country a very intense literary work, didactic and journalistic.

He never forgot his Paraguayan roots, being his life, his nation and his culture the main inspiration of his many work, Esther poetic, theatrical or prose, enriching our cultural patrimony

He was exiled in Buenos Aires and he went on writing his best Works and his compositions were given music by important Paraguayan musicians.

He also reached jobs in two of the main journalistic media of the capital del Plata, since he was a corrector of the proofs in the newspapers LA RAZON for 18 years, and La NACION for 7 years.

Ortiz Mayans said that his love for the writings did not make him a good reader, since he read a little, but nevertheless, his Works reflect a great warm and a literary quality, both in his Works as a book writer as well as in his theatre work or research Works, and also in his lyrics which were later transformed into songs, with a resonant touching the soul of all his countrymen, transcending other places as well.

He came back in strange occasions to Paraguay, his country, which he always remembered but due to his political reasons, he had to abandon . He came back as visitor in 1982, when he was a central figure in the homage of the organizers of the Festival del Lago Ypacarai, which was on his behalf that year and which had his name.

== Works ==
He entered different literary genders, his main work being the first GRAN DICCIONARIO CASTELLANO-GUARANI, reaching the public in 1933, without much ambitions, because it only had 66 pages and 5000 words, but with a sustain growth in the following editions

It was re edited in 1935, 1937, 1941, 1945, in 1954, with a grammar compendium, in 1959, 1961,1962, and the tenth edition in 1973, obtaining the best splendor, since it has now 12.240 guarani voices, 32.920 Spanish voices and better words added, according to the comments of Roque Vallejos

He was the author of several theatre plays such as : "Nuestra Vieja Casa", in three acts, and "Amaos los Unos a los Otros" and many others.

Some of his other works are : "Cantos Nuevos", with a prologue of Dr.Rafael Oddone, edited in 1930, "Zorazábal, su Vida, sus Obras", the Spanish version of Julio Correa`s work "Ñanemba`era`y", "Tataindy nde pyharépe", "Evocaciones de Asunción" and in 1977, "Voces Añoradas".

== Poems transformed in songs ==
“No Despunta aun el alba cuando inicias tú la marcha y al mercado te diriges a llevar mba`erepy, no haces caso de la lluvia ni te importa si la escarcha, solo pueden depararte el dolor de un mba`asy", said the first words of his song "Burrerita", one of his mainly spread Works, whose music was componed by Félix Pérez Cardozo, Demetrio Ortiz, Luis Alberto del Paraná, Emigdio Ayala Báez, Remberto Giménez, Herminio Giménez y Florentín Giménez, among others we can mention "Pasionaria", "Barrerita", "Bajo el Cielo del Paraguay", "Asuncena", "Quyquyhó", with music of Francisco Alvarenga.

== Bibliography ==
- Sonidos de mi Tierra.
