= 1845 in music =

List of years in music	(table)
- … 1835; 1836; 1837; 1838; 1839; 1840; 1841; 1842; 1843; 1844; 1845; 1846; 1847; 1848; 1849; 1850; 1851; 1852; 1853; 1854; 1855 …
- Art; Archaeology; Architecture; Literature; Music; Philosophy; Science; +...

== Events ==
- March 13 – Felix Mendelssohn's Violin Concerto is premièred in Leipzig with Ferdinand David as soloist.
- April 21 – Albert Lortzing's opera Undine debuts in Magdeburg.
- June 4 – William Fry's opera Leonora debuts in Philadelphia.
- July – Pas de Quatre is premièred in London, bringing together four of the greatest ballerinas of the time: Lucile Grahn, Carlotta Grisi, Fanny Cerrito, and Marie Taglioni.
- July 19 – The National Anthem of Uruguay is first performed with music composed by Francisco José Debali with the collaboration of Fernando Quijano.
- October 19 – Richard Wagner's opera Tannhäuser debuts at the Dresden Hoftheater.
- Composer Henry Hugo Pierson goes to live in Germany.
- The Hutchinson Family Singers tour England with Frederick Douglass.
- Theodore Thomas arrives in the United States. The conductor would eventually become the Father of American Symphonic culture.
- Austrian pianist Leopold von Meyer (1816–1883) begins a tour of the United States.
- The saxhorn family of valved brass instruments is patented by Adolphe Sax in France.

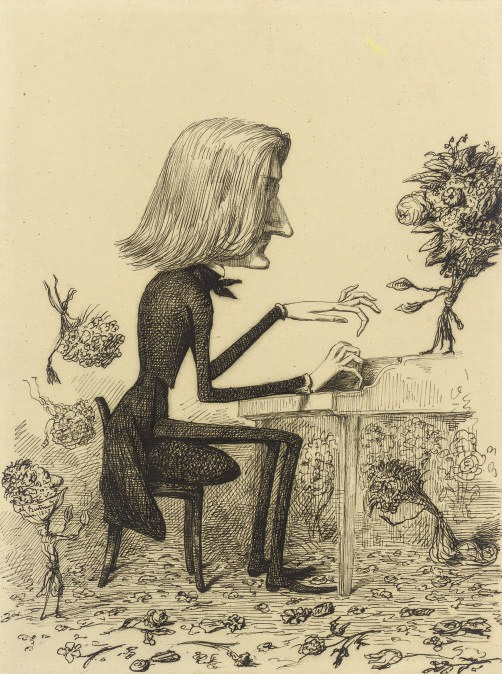
1845 caricature of Franz Liszt

== Classical music ==
- Frédéric Chopin - Mazurkas, Op. 59
- Francesco Florimo – La Tarantella
- Hans Christian Lumbye – Champagne Galop, Op. 14
- Robert Schumann – Piano Concerto in A minor
- Pedro Soler – Premier Air varié sur un thème original
- Václav Veit – Les adieux, Op. 26
- Giuseppe Verdi – Seste Romanze II
- Samuel Sebastian Wesley – Morning and Evening Service in E major

== Opera ==
- W. H. Fry – Leonora
- Albert Lortzing – Undine
- Giovanni Pacini – Stella di Napoli, premiered December 11 in Naples
- Temistocle Solera – La Hermana de Palayo
- Giuseppe Verdi
  - Alzira
  - Giovanna d'Arco
- Richard Wagner – Tannhäuser

== Births ==
- January 17 – Erika Nissen, pianist (died 1903)
- February 25 – Eugène Goossens, père, conductor (d. 1906)
- March 5 – Alphonse Hasselmans, harpist and composer (d. 1912)
- March 7 – Edward Lloyd, concert tenor (d. 1927)
- March 13 – Joséphine Daram, opera singer (died 1926)
- March 14 – August Bungert, opera composer (d. 1915)
- May 12 – Gabriel Fauré, composer (d. 1924)
- May 22 – Francis Hueffer, music writer (died 1889)
- June 13 – Effie Germon, actress and singer (d. 1914)
- July 1 – Ika Peyron, composer (d. 1922)
- July 6 – Ángela Peralta, operatic soprano (d. 1883)
- August 10 – Abay Qunanbayuli, poet, composer and philosopher (d. 1904)
- August 25 – King Ludwig II of Bavaria, the great patron of Richard Wagner
- November 6 – Beniamino Cesi, pianist (d. 1907)
- November 8 – Madeline Schiller, pianist (d. 1911)
- date unknown
  - Annie Jessy Curwen, writer of children's music books (died 1932)
  - Antonio Galassi, operatic baritone (d. 1904)

== Deaths ==
- January 19 – Carl Borromäus von Miltitz, composer (born 1781)
- March 29 – Victor Lhérie, librettist (born 1808)
- May 11 – Carl Filtsch, pianist and composer (b. 1830)
- July 10 – Juan Paris, composer and priest (born 1805)
- July 15 – Joseph Augustine Wade, conductor and composer (b. 1796)
- September 23 – Matija Ahacel, collector of folk songs (b. 1779)
- October 7 – Isabella Colbran, soprano and first wife of Gioacchino Rossini (b. 1785)
- October 16 – Martha Llwyd, hymn-writer (b. 1766)
- October 26 – Carolina Oliphant Nairne, songwriter (born 1766)
- November 2 – Chrétien Urhan, violinist and organist (b. 1790)
- December 2 – Simon Mayr, composer (b. 1763)
- December 25 – Wilhelm Friedrich Ernst Bach, composer (b. 1759)
- date unknown – Alexander Juhan, violinist, conductor and composer (b. 1765)
