= Paraguayan polka =

Folk music

- Stylistic origins: Guaraní dances; Western Music; Ballroom dance
- Cultural origins: Paraguay
- Typical instruments: Guitar; Paraguayan harp; Trombone; Trumpet; Double bass; Clarinet; Cornet; Piano; Accordion

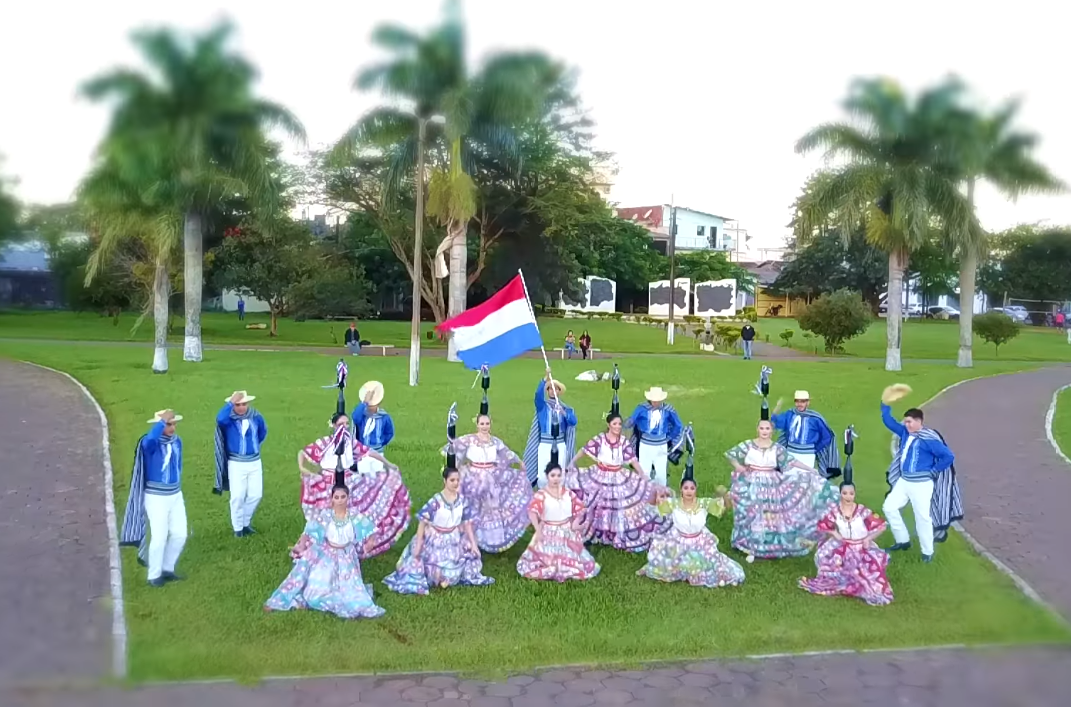
Paraguayan Polka being performed in a public park, 2019.

Paraguayan polka, also known as danza paraguaya (Paraguayan dance), is a style of music created in Paraguay in the 19th century. The Paraguayan polka is very different from the traditional polka, mainly because the Paraguayan version combines ternary and binary rhythms, whereas the European only uses binary. The juxtaposition of the mentioned rhythms gives the peculiar sound that characterizes this style. There are several variants of the Paraguayan polka such as polca syryry, polca kyre'y, polca correntina, polca popo, polca saraki, polca galopa, polca jekutu. All of them are slightly different because of the different influences and styles adopted by the composers in the early years of the Paraguayan polka.

The oldest polkas in Paraguay are from the early 19th century, such as Campamento Cerro León, Alfonso Loma, Mamá Cumanda, Che Lucero Aguai'y, Ndarekoi La Culpa, London Karape and Carreta Guy.

== Celebrated polka composers ==
- Emigdio Ayala Báez.
- Agustín Barboza.
- Emilio Biggi.
- Emilio Bobadilla Cáceres.
- Oscar Cardozo Ocampo.
- Mauricio Cardozo Ocampo.
- Hilarión Correa.
- Félix Fernández.
- Emiliano R. Fernández.
- Maneco Galeano.
- Florentín Giménez.
- Herminio Giménez.
- Juan Carlos Moreno González.
- Carlos Noguera.
- Agustín Pío Barrios.
- Eladio Martínez.
- Luis Alberto del Paraná

== See also ==
- Music of Paraguay
- Chamamé
