= Emilio Bobadilla Cáceres =

- Born: Emilio Bobadilla Cáceres; March 3, 1907; Pirayú, Paraguay
- Died: March 21, 1979 (aged 72); Asunción, Paraguay
- Known for: Musician
- Notable work: "Ñane aramboha" y "Koeti jave"

Emilio Bobadilla Cáceres (1907-1979) was a Paraguayan songwriter. He was born in Cerro Verá, in the town of Pirayú, Paraguay, on March 3, 1907. He was son of Ramón Bobadilla and Isabel Cáceres.

== Childhood and Youth ==
Still being a child he moved to Asunción, where he learned to play the “tiple” (a small guitar that served to the musical embellishment of the guitar plucking) and later the guitar. Since 1930 he lived in Buenos Aires, where he formed, along with Agustín Barboza, the duet Barboza-Cáceres.

== Beginnings ==
In 1934 he participated in the recording of the first disc of the Ortiz Guerrero's Orchestra, directed by the master José Asunción Flores, with the song “Ñane arambohá”, composed with lyric of Félix Fernández.

== Career ==
In 1939, with his brother Cristóbal Cáceres, he started a series of recordings using the name “Dúo de los Hermanos Cáceres” (The Brothers Cáceres Duet), until 1950, with the orchestra “Ñande roga” of Mauricio Cardozo Ocampo.

He was founder and first president of “Intérpretes de Folklore Asociados del Paraguay – IFAP” (Associated Folklore Performers of Paraguay) and also was Vice President of APA in the ‘70s.

== Last years ==
He died in Asunción, on March 21, 1979.

== Work ==
He composed many songs with lyrics from important poets:

- “Ñane aramboha” (with Félix Fernández and Agustín Barboza, the latter, was also co-author of the music)
- “Koeti jave” (with Emiliano R. Fernandez)
- “Imomoramby purahei” (with Crispiniano Martínez González)
- “Golondrina fugitiva”
- “Alondra feliz”
- “Angel de la sierra”
- “A mi rosa dormida”
- “Okaraguami a.k.a. sayju”
- “En mi prisión de esmeralda” (Guarania that narrates dramatically the life in the yerba plantations in Alto Paraná, at the beginning of the 20th century)
- “Ñande korochiré”
- “Ne mba’e raminte Angélica”
- “Sobre el corazón de mi guitarra”
- “Che sy mi marangatúpe”
- “Virgen y flor” (based on poem from Carlos Miguel Giménez)
- “Chipera Luque” (with Darío Gómez Serrato).
