= Los 3 Paraguayos =

Paraguayan band

Los 3 Paraguayos (Note: or Los Tres Paraguayos, "The Three Paraguayans") was a Paraguayan music trio based in Europe in the early 1960s.

With the worldwide popularity of Los Paraguayos in the late 1950s, other Paraguayan musicians sought to capitalize on the Paraguayan music craze. In 1962, a similar group was formed, consisting of Félix de Ypacaraí (born Felipe Leiva Rolón) and Daniel Cardozo Bogado on vocals and guitar, and Pablo Morel Vázquez, the nephew of Félix Pérez Cardozo, on harp. Ypacaraí and Cardozo had previously played for two years with Digno García of the original Los Paraguayos as "Los Carios" in Digno García y los Carios. This new group's repertoire was similar to that of Los Paraguayos: a blend of traditional Paraguayan music with popular arrangements of Latin American standards. The trio recorded three albums.

Los Tres Paraguayos soon disbanded, and Ypacaraí, Cardozo and Morel went on to form Félix de Ypacaraí y sus Paraguayos, Los Fabulosos 3 Paraguayos and Pablito y sus Trovadores Paraguayos respectively.
