= Nicolino Pellegrini =

Italian composer

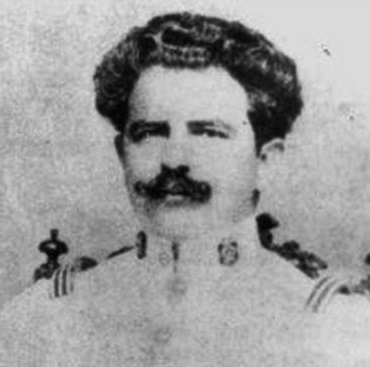
Nicolino Pellegrini

Nicolino Pellegrini (1873–1933) was an Italian musician who arrived in Paraguay in 1893 as a product of the reconstruction of the country after the Paraguayan War, which forced the government to bring European professionals.

In 1912 he founded the Police marching band of Asunción and eventually formed the finest Paraguayan composers and musicians such as Agustín Pío Barrios, José Asunción Flores (teach the foundations for the guarania), Remberto Giménez and Herminio Giménez. Pellegrini is the author of the first Paraguayan zarzuela in 1913, called Tierra Guaraní. He died in 1933.
