= Los Fabulosos 3 Paraguayos =

Paraguayan band

Los Fabulosos 3 Paraguayos (Note: or Los Fabulosos Tres Paraguayos, "The Fabulous Three Paraguayans") was a Europe-based Paraguayan music trio consisting of Daniel Cardozo Bogado and Leonardo López Aquino on vocals and guitar and Pedro Álvarez Redes on harp. The group released over 50 albums. Cardozo had been a member of Los 3 Paraguayos in the early 1960s, itself a copycat of the popular Los Paraguayos. When Los 3 Paraguayos split in 1965, Cardozo formed new trio with the same name, which eventually became known as Los Fabulosos 3 Paraguayos.
