= Los Paraguayos =

Paraguayan band

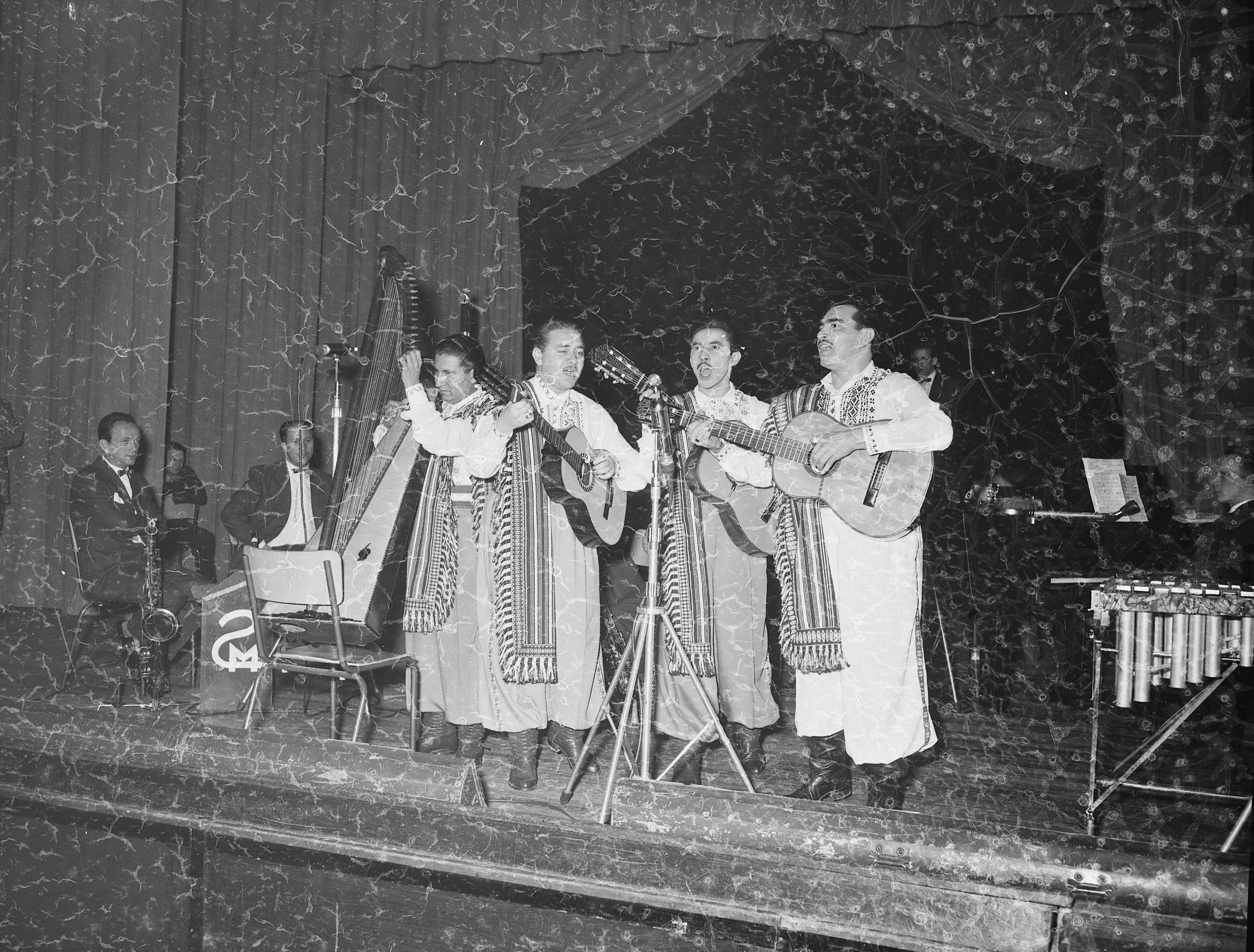
Trio Los Paraguayos, 1956

Los Paraguayos was a series of music groups from Paraguay. From their formation in the 1950s, the groups, first fronted by Luis Alberto del Paraná and then his brother Reynaldo Meza, featured different variations of the name Paraguayos, as well as different singers and musicians, playing guitars, bongo drums and a Paraguayan harp.

Based in Europe, the group blended traditional Paraguayan music with popular arrangements and performed many South American and Mexican tunes and songs, including classics, such as "Guantanamera", "Cielito Lindo" and "Pajaro Campana (The Bell Bird)". Most famous in the 1960s, the group retained its popularity, selling many albums and appearing at many concerts throughout the world.

== Background ==
Paraguayan singer and guitarist Luis Alberto del Paraná (born Luis Osmer Meza) was recruited by Gumersindo Ayala Aquino to form the trio Los Guaireños with fellow guitarist and singer Humberto Barúa and harpist Digno García. The group began touring in Paraguay in 1945 and moved on first to Argentine and then throughout Latin America. When the trio's contract ended, the three, then in Mexico City, re-formed as Trío Paraguayo and settled in Peru. In 1952, Paraná returned to Paraguay.

== 1953–1956 ==
Through the efforts of politician and poet Epifanio Méndez Fleitas to promote Paraguayan music in Europe, a new group, Trío Los Paraguayos, was formed with Paraná, Digno García and Agustín Barboza. The president of Paraguay, Federico Chaves, and his finance minister, Guillermo Enciso Velloso, signed an executive decree in November 1953 providing each member of the trio the sum of US$3200 (equivalent to $38,500 in 2025) and diplomatic passports for what was called an "official cultural mission".

In May 1954 they arrived in Europe and began performing in Italy, France and Belgium. In Antwerp, they auditioned for the Dutch Philips Records and were signed to a record deal, which resulted in successful albums, EPs and singles.

With the end of their official cultural mission and the expiration of the trio's contract, the trio split up but the three members remained in Europe.

== 1956–1974 ==
In 1956, Paraná formed Luis Alberto del Paraná y su Trío Los Paraguayos with his brother Reynaldo Meza, Rubito Medina and harpist José de los Santos González. The other former Trío Los Paraguayos members formed groups including Digno García y su Trío del Paraguay, Agustín Barboza y sus Compañeros and Agustín Barboza And His Paraguayan Trio.

The most successful, though was Paraná's band, which had a string of hit albums with Philips including Ambassadors Of Romance (1958) and Songs And Dances Of Latin America (1961). Managed by Johnny Stark, the group would go on to sell over 20 million albums for Philips and become the most successful Paraguayan artists worldwide. The band performed in 76 countries in venues such as Royal Albert Hall in London, the Olympia in Paris, Hilton Hotel in Cairo, Madison Square Garden in New York and for twenty thousand people in Tokyo.

Paraná appeared in and provided music for the 1962 Argentine film La Burrerita de Ypacaraí. Along with the Beatles, Marlene Dietrich and others, the band performed at the 1963 Royal Variety Performance at the Prince of Wales Theatre in London before a royal audience, performing "Bésame Mucho" (with Meza on vocals) at the request of the Beatles. The group was also chosen for the 1966 Sanremo Music Festival song contest in Italy.

The group's extravagant outfits and their simplified ballad- or bolero-style arrangements and orchestrations followed the market patterns of commercial popular music of the time, but also brought the band some criticism. Nevertheless, the group remained immensely popular in Paraguay.

By 1974, the group consisted of Paraná, his brother Meza, bandoneonist Alfredo Marcucci, Arsenio Jara, Ángel "Pato" García and Oscar Ramos Ramírez. Paraná died suddenly at age 48 in London in 1974 following an appearance in Moscow, bringing an end to the second iteration of Los Paraguayos.

== 1974–2002 ==
With the death of Paraná, his brother Reynaldo Meza took over as Reynaldo Meza y los Paraguayos leading the band until his death in July 2002.

== Other groups ==
With the success of Paraná's Paraguayos, other similar groups sought to capitalize on their popularity. Another band, Los 3 Paraguayos also performed and recorded in Europe in the early 1960s and soon split to form Félix De Ypacaraí y sus Paraguayos, Los Fabulosos 3 Paraguayos and Pablito y sus Trovadores Paraguayos.

The comedy rock band, Alberto y Lost Trios Paranoias, from the 1970s took their name as a satirical version of Luis Alberto del Paraná y su Trío Los Paraguayos.
