= Paraguayan bottle dance =

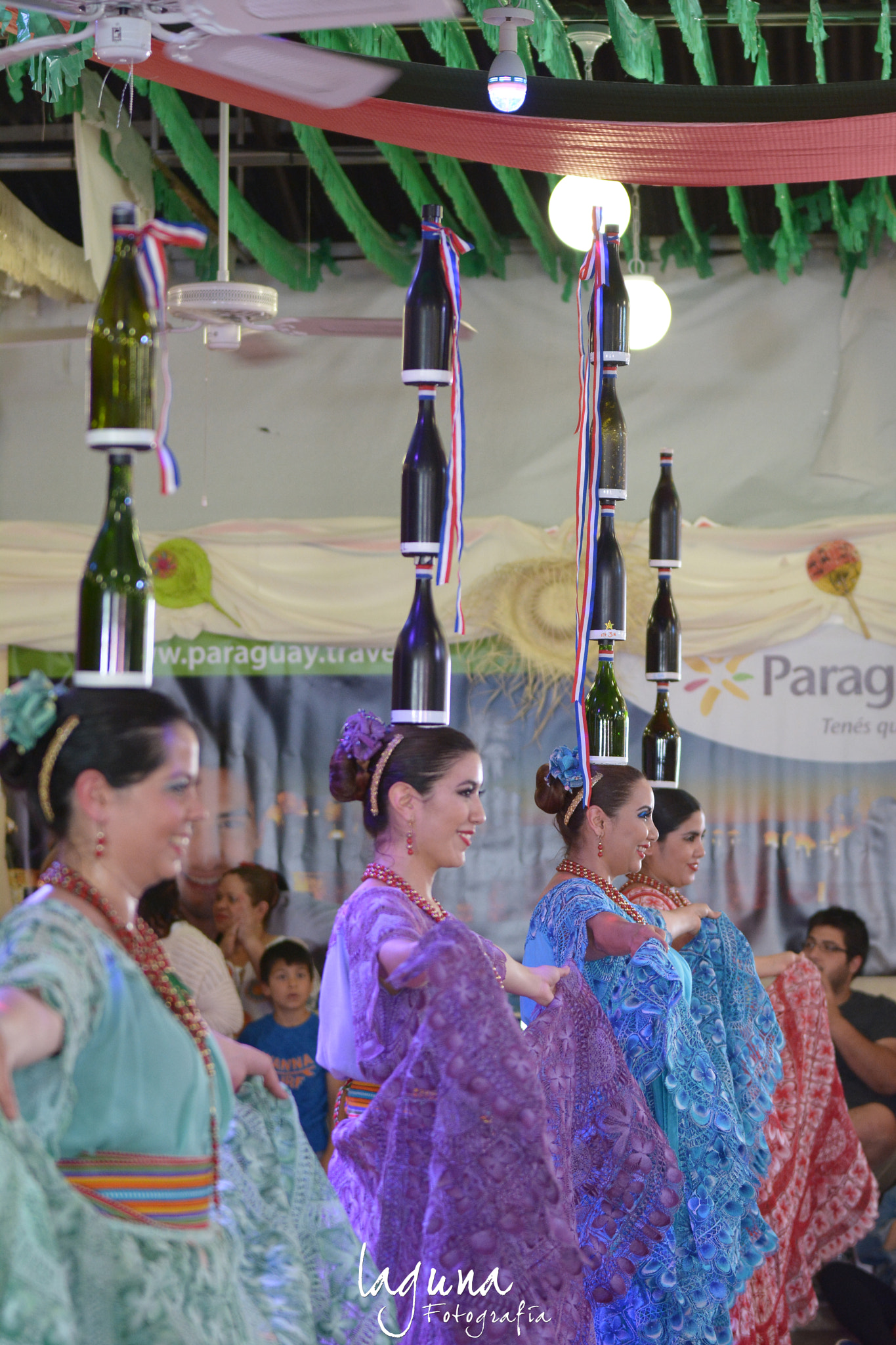
Paraguayan bottle dance performance in Fuengirola, Spain

The Paraguayan bottle dance (Spanish: Danza de la Botella) is a traditional folk dance from Paraguay in which performers dance with glass bottles balanced on their heads.

== History ==
The origin of the bottle dance remains unclear. One theory is that the dance was derived from the galopa folk dance, which consists of dancers performing with jugs on top of their heads, with dancers replacing jugs with glass bottles.

== Performance ==
Bottle dances performances feature female dancers wearing nineteenth century rural costumes that includes an ankle-length skirt. Performances are typically accompanied by music from the Paraguayan polka genre. Bottle dance performances tend to be largely improvised with basic moves consisting of dancers with outstretched arms holding the ruffles of their skirts while maintaining the impression that there aren't any bottles. The dance can be perform by individuals, pairs, or groups with each dancer balancing one or two bottles but more advanced dancers are able balance ten or more bottles on their heads. The bottles used by dancers are usually decorated with a tricolored ribbon resembling the Paraguayan flag or with flowers. Also, when a dancer performs with multiple stacked bottles, she uses bottles designed to attach to each other but do not attach to her head.

== In popular culture ==
The twentieth and thirty-second seasons of the American reality show The Amazing Race featured a task in which contestants had to perform the bottle dance while in Asunción.

During the second season of Got Talent España, one contestant, Belén Torres, auditioned with a bottle dance performance that concluded with her dancing with a stack of five bottles. Three years later, another contestant, Erika Vega, auditioned during the show's fifth season with a bottle dance performance that concluded with her dancing with a stack of ten bottles.

== See also ==
- Music of Paraguay
