= Cachaca (musical genre) =

20th century Paraguayan music genre

- Other names: Kachaka, Kchk, Cachaca piru
- Stylistic origins: Colombian cumbia, Mexican cumbia
- Cultural origins: 1970s and early 1980s in Barrio Obrero, Asunción, Paraguay
- Typical instruments: accordion, electric bass, percussion, electronic organ, synthesiser, etc.

Regional scenes
- Paraguay, northeastern provinces of Argentina.

Cachaca or kchaka, or kachaka (Spanish pronunciation: [kaˈt͡ʃa.ka]) is a musical genre that originated in Paraguay in the late 1970s and early 1980s. It is descended from Colombian cumbia, Mexican cumbia, grupera music, and Tecnocumbia.

== Etymology ==
Although it is a genre derived from cumbia, it receives the Colombian term of cachaca, as a version of the song Por el amor de Claudia by the Colombian composer Guillermo Buitrago became popular in the 1970s when it was recorded by La Sonora Dinamita. The chorus of the song went:

La cachaca tiene un Buey,
La cachaca tiene un Buey,
La cachaca tiene un Buey,
Que lo llaman la Esperanza.

The variant spellings "kachaka" and "kchaka" may originate from the 1990s programme "Kchak" presented by Hugo Javier González.

== History ==
In the early 1970s, several Colombian cumbia bands and soloists (such as Lisandro Meza, La Sonora Dinamita, etc.), and Mexican cumbia groups (although the Mexican influence would not become very noticeable until the second half of the 1980s), more specifically in the line of grupera music (such as El Tiempo, Bronco (band) or Los Bukis, etc.) began to spread their music in countries such as Paraguay.

In the 1990s, the cachaca genre flourished with the pioneering groups, but Mexican bands such as Mandingo, Guardianes del Amor, Los Rehenes, Los Temerarios, Grupo Bryndis, among others, also joined in and had an influence.

Later, the genre gained a lot of traction in Bolivia and especially in Paraguay, where the first Paraguayan cachaca performers emerged in the 2000s.

It is worth noting that it was during this time that the first groups of Paraguayan cachaca emerged, including Grupo Show Madrigal and Los Roller's.

By the 2000s, the popularity of cachaca had declined, but due to the immigration of Paraguayans from rural areas to other countries, especially Argentina, the genre spread territorially through local radio, leading to the emergence of groups such as Refugio de Amor, Tiempo de Amor and Los Ponys in the province of Buenos Aires.

== Characteristics and Composition ==
Although it does not have a defined composition, all cachaca or kachaka songs have a primary rhythm derived from Colombian cumbia. They are characterised by a slightly slower tempo, rhythmic repetition without variations, and the use of acoustic or, more commonly, electric drum kits. The lyrics typically cover a range of themes, including economic crisis, patriotism, machismo, unhappy loves, romanticism, heartbreak, and occasionally eroticism. In addition to the drum kit, a traditional group in this genre also includes an electric guitar, bass guitar, synthesiser or electric keyboard (the latter being frequently used for solos), accordion, and sometimes even saxophone. A major influence on this genre was Lalo y Los Descalzos, who completely modified this movement, expanding it and leading many groups to adopt their style of interpretation and sound as their own. This characteristic can be observed in groups such as Refugio de Amor, Los Ponys, Rolo y Los Impecables, and Frecuencia Trío.

The chachaca's lyrics often address themes such as economic crisis, patriotism, machism, unhappy loves, romanticism, heartbreak, and occasionally eroticism.

The genre is influenced by Vallenato, Colombian cumbia, chicha, Mexican cumbia, Tex-mex, and norteño cumbia.

== Popularity ==
Cachaca music is widely popular in the shanty towns and rural areas of Paraguay, Argentina, and Bolivia. In Paraguay, it is a unique phenomenon with artists such as Lalo y Los Descalzos (a group that originated in the Latin community of California, United States) achieving significant success. While they are relatively unknown in the grupero scene of Mexico, they have gained a loyal following in Paraguay, where they are almost considered a national act. In Argentina, their music can be heard in provinces such as Corrientes, Formosa, and Misiones, as well as in Buenos Aires due to the large Paraguayan immigrant population. As a result, in Argentina, cachaca is often associated with Paraguayan music and culture.

Other Mexican artists such as Javier Mora and Grupo Espartaco (formed by former members of El Tiempo) have built their careers exclusively in Paraguay, recording their music there and becoming public figures in that country. In their home country, however, they are virtually unknown. Another notable artist in the genre is the Mexican group Bronco, which has also gained a strong following in Paraguay. Their lead singer José Guadalupe Esparza and his presence in Paraguayan culture has come to embody the essence of what it means to be Paraguayan.

=== Argentina ===
In Argentina in the early 1990s, the Argentine record label Magenta Discos began to create groups that performed covers of Mexican bands that were unknown in Argentina as the "tropical" movement gradually became massively popular in the Argentine media. Under the name of Cachacas Favoritas, (also known in Argentina as "Bailanta") a series of compilations of Argentine groups performing covers of grupera music was released, including bands such as Los Ávila, Los Dora2, Ternura, Commanche, Peluche, Volcán, María y los pura sangre, Complot, Bronk, and Montana, among others.

The businessman and TV presenter Johnny Allon founded the bailanta and radio station Cachaquísimo in 1994 in San Justo, in the western area of Greater Buenos Aires. Dedicated to the Paraguayan community in the area, it was responsible for spreading Mexican cumbia under the name of "cachaca".

The bailantas Radio Studio in the Buenos Aires and Mbarete Bronco in the town of Avellaneda, in the southern area of Greater Buenos Aires, both dedicated to the Paraguayan community living in Argentina, along with their respective radio stations, also feature mostly Mexican cumbia under the name of "cachaca" in their programming.

== See also ==
- Tecnocumbia
- Mexican cumbia
- Grupero
- Cumbia (Colombia)
- Cumbia villera
- Music of Paraguay
- Polca paraguaya
- Chamamé
