= Remberto Giménez =

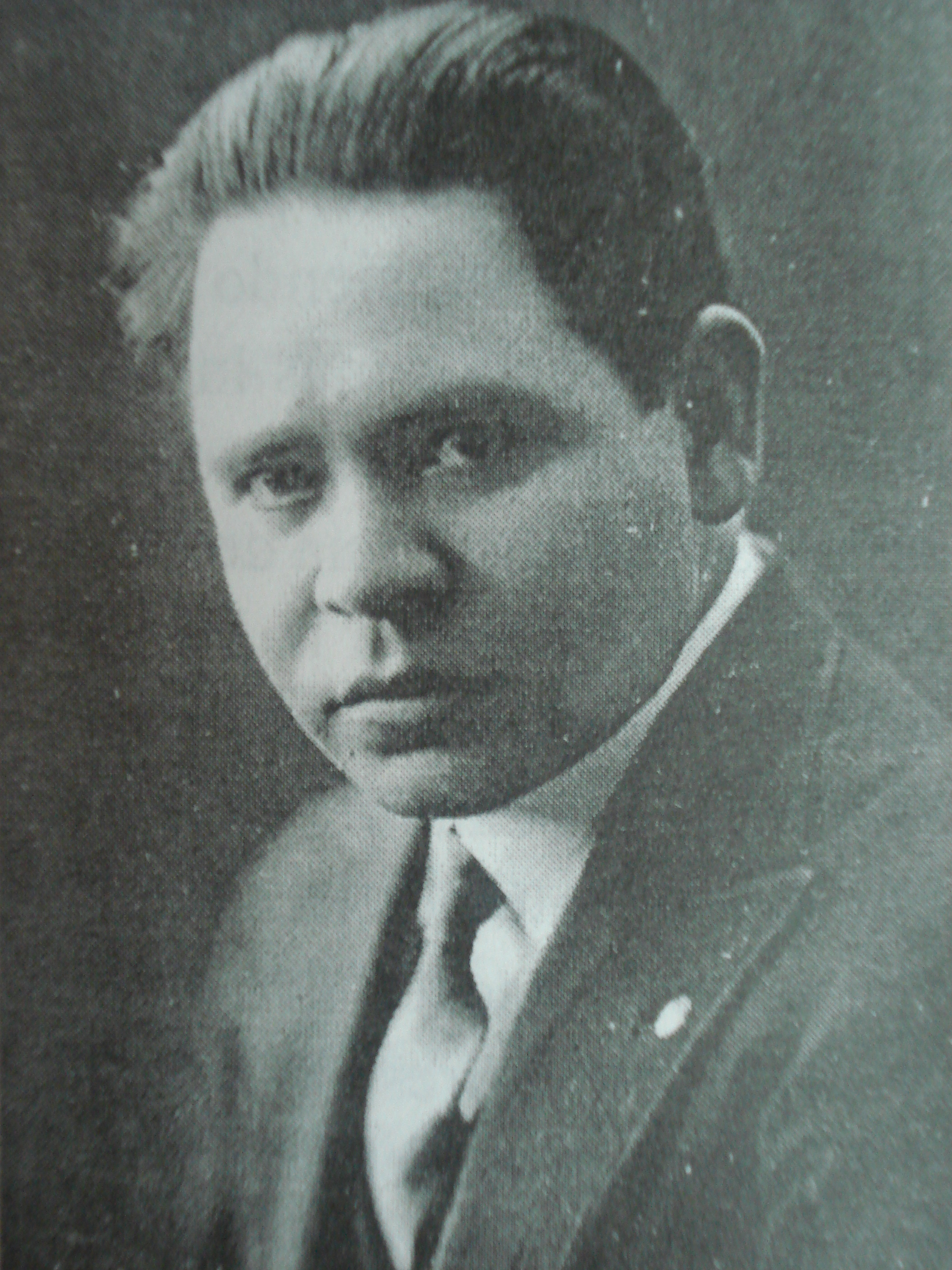

Background information
- Born: Remberto Giménez; February 4, 1898; Coronel Oviedo, Paraguay
- Died: February 15, 1977 (aged 79) Asunción, Paraguay
- Occupation: Musician

Remberto Giménez (February 4, 1898 – February 15, 1977) was a Paraguayan musician. His arrangement of the Paraguayan National Anthem is the current one used today.

== Early life ==
He was born in Coronel Oviedo, Paraguay on February 4, 1898 as a son of Ciriaco Giménez and Ana Bella Benítez.

== Beginnings ==
As he concluded his military service he studied singing and violin theory with Vicente Maccarone, in the Paraguayan Institute.

| Year | Highlights |
|---|---|
| 1920 | The Paraguayan government granted him a scholarship to study in Buenos Aires. He did so at the National Conservatory. He attended violin and chamber music classes with Andrés Gaos, and composition with Alberto Williams and Celestino Piaggio. He was an incomparable musical activity organiser and participated in almost every cultural event in Paraguay. In 1912 Nicolino Pellegrini founded the Music Band of the Police of the Capital where Remberto continued his musical studies and later, was a musical theory teacher. He was a pupil of Salvador Déntice. He participated in the formation of great musicians such as José Asunción Flores and Fernando Centurión. He returned to Paraguay and got involved in numerous activities that granted him quick popularity. He got a new scholarship from the Paraguayan government, this time to travel to Europe. He entered the "Schola Cantorum" of París. There he attended Lucien Capet's classes to evolve as a violinist for two years. Also, he took Esthetical and History of Music courses at La Sorbonne university. |
| 1927 | He moved to Berlin, where he enhanced his violin and chamber music skills with Alejandro Perschnicoff, at the Stern Vhes Conservatorium. |
| 1928 | From 1928 on, he lived in Paraguay becoming one of the main encouragers of musical life in the country. Along with the fellow musicians Alfred Kamprad (German musician residing in Paraguay), Enrique Marsal and Erik Piezunka he was part of "Cuarteto de Asunción", the most important referent and representative of chamber music in Paraguay in that time. He organized the first full symphonic orchestra concert in 1928 in tribute to Franz Schubert one hundredth birthdate. |
| 1934 | A national consensus was done to find a musical author for the Paraguayan National Anthem. The national government decided to go for Remberto's the authentic restructured version of the anthem. |

== His trajectory ==
| Year | Highlights |
|---|---|
| 1940 | He founded the Normal School of Music, music teaching institution of distinguished labour. |
| 1957 | He got the Municipality of Asunción to sponsor the Symphonic Orchestra of the City of Asunción (OSCA). He was head of the orchestra until he died. |
| 1958 | He presented "Paraguayan Rhapsody" along with the Symphonic Orchestra of the Bonn Radio of Germany therefore becoming the first Paraguayan musician to direct a European symphonic orchestra. |
| 1963 | He directed the Brazilian Symphonic Orchestra in the Municipal theatre of Rio de Janeiro and in Tupi Theatre of Channel 7 in São Paulo. |

== Charges occupied regarding art ==
He was a restless musical event organizer ad participated of countless cultural events. He was member of the Academy of Language and Guaraní Culture. Remberto was one of the main supporters of the union between the Paraguayan Institute and Gymnasium, fusion of which emerged the Paraguayan Association. He was the first president of A.P.A. (Associated Paraguayan Authors). He was a teacher in the National School of the Capital and in the School of Girls of Asunción. Also he was general music director "ad honorem".

In the educational field, he was part of the formation of choirs and wrote popular music arrangements, also writing some songs dedicated to the youths. Several brilliant violinists and pianists emerged from the Normal School of Music. The fact that Remberto never entirely shared his knowledge about composition is criticized and is the probable reason for not leaving disciples. Other intriguing fact is that he never invited other orchestra director to direct his (OSCA).

He was said to be an orchestra director and violinist.

As a creator his symphonic pieces remain in a nationalist and romantic style as other pieces share a limited style of popular pieces of good taste. He directed and published various editions of his arrangements and anthems just as the different versions for the national anthem. He published two discs with the (OSCA) sponsored by the Municipality of Asunción.

== Compositions ==
"Paraguayos, República o Muerte" (Instrumental - brass band, long)
Francisco José Debali's "Paraguayos, República o Muerte" performed by the United States Navy Band

His pieces belong to a nationalist and romantic style. In some pieces like "Rapsodia Paraguaya" of (Nicolino Pellegrini) a superiority can be sensed regarding other composers of the time.

In his pieces: Campanento Cerro León, La Golondrina, Nostalgias del terruño, Ka'aguy Ryakua (Fragrance of the forest) and Kuarahy oike jave (When the sun sets), la Marcha presidential and numerous arrangements for symphonic orchestra.

He is author of various pieces for violin and piano.

Amongst his songs: Himno a la juventud, Canción de paz, Al pie de tu reja y Conscripto, Himno del Colegio Nacional de la Capital and Armonía.

== Last years ==
He married Silvia Fiandro, with whom he had children. He died the February 15, 1977 in Asunción.
