= Laureano Fuentes Matons =

Cuban musician

Laureano Fuentes Matons (Santiago de Cuba, 3 July 1825 – 30 September 1898) came from a family of musicians and wrote the first opera to be composed on the island, La hija de Jefe (The Chief's daughter). This was later lengthened and staged under the title Seila. His numerous works spanned all genres. Wrote Las artes en Santiago de Cuba (1893) in which a transcription of "Son de Ma Teodora" (purportedly composed in the 16th century) is given. An extended assessment of his work is given by Alejo Carpentier.

Fuentes studied under Juan París, and mastered the violin from a young age. His son was Laureano Fuentes Pérez, a famous pianist and composer.

== Links ==
- Free scores by Laureano Fuentes Matons at the International Music Score Library Project (IMSLP)
