= Eladio Martínez =

Paraguayan musician (1912–1990)

- Born: May 19, 1912; Paraguarí, Paraguay
- Died: 1990 (aged 77–78); Asunción, Paraguay
- Known for: Music
- Notable work: Lucerito Alba, Cayé

Eladio Martínez (May 19, 1912 – 1990) was a Paraguayan musician.

== Life and family ==
Martínez was born in Paraguarí on May 19, 1912. He was born into a family of musicians, to Lorenzo Martínez and Nicolasa Benítez. His father was a bandleader of a group formed entirely by his relatives in Villarrica. Initially he learn to play the flute and later the guitar, an instrument that he used to play fluently, although his most remarkable contribution to the music was as singer and composer.

He moved to Asunción in 1928. His participation at a folkloric amateur competition sponsored by Roque Centurión Miranda at the Municipal Theatre was the event that convinced the most to become a professional musician. In that occasion won the first prize representing Villarica and performing "Che la reina" by Emiliano R. Fernández and Félix Pérez Cardozo. It was 1930.

In 1931, he traveled to Montevideo, Uruguay, and afterward moved to Buenos Aires, where he joined Mauricio Cardozo Ocampo in the famous duo "Martínez-Cardozo". This was the first Paraguayan band that performed at the important SODRE Hall of Montevideo, among other places.

He married Aida Ayala. His sons "Lobo" and Jorge "Lobito" Martínez are also popular and talented musicians.

He died in 1990 in Asunción.

== Career ==
For fifteen years managed radio shows in Buenos Aires such as "Movimiento musical paraguayo" ("Paraguayan music movement") in Radio Cultura and "Polcas y Guaranias" ("Polkas and Guaranias") in Radio Rivadavia, and also some other shows in other radio stations as Belgrano, Mitre, El Mundo, Excelsior, among others.

By then used to perform as soloist, accompanied by the guitar, or in the Felix Perez Cardozo's band (whom which recorded many discs), the Gumersindo Ayala Aquino's Band or his own, "Nelly".

In 1948 was invited to the Olympic Games in London, England, sponsored by Sir Eugen Millington-Drake, to make up for the Paraguayan absence in Olympic sports. He also invited the composer Emigdio Ayala Báez (then was when they composed the Guarania "Oración a mi amada", "Prayer to my love" in English, one of the most popular loving songs in Paraguay) and the harpist Albino Quiñónez. The "Olympic Trio", as the group was named, performed with great success in special TV shows at the BBC, singing to the Olympic delegations of different countries, at the Oxford University and performing to the Royal Family itself, extending his tour to many European cities.

Back to Buenos Aires had at his charge, the music for the film "El trueno entre las hojas", ("The thunder among the leaves") directed by Armando Bo with script from Augusto Roa Bastos.

After many years of brilliant international career, Eladio Martínez resolved to return to his land. He became a symbol in trying to rescue and promote the folkloric music at the universities during the '70. By then, because of his great popularity and his belonging to a generation of extraordinary Paraguayan musicians he received the surname of "El grande" ("The big one").

To his composer and singer skills, he added his natural gift for speech, his implacable scold to the ones who negated the great truths of the Paraguayan music related to the "golden generation" that he used to know as few, and his amazing charisma.

In 1979, accompanied by his guitar and voice, went to Japan where he was carrying out the World Youth Football Championship.

Briefly, before his decease, directed a popular radio show in Radio Tajy of Asunción named Una guitarra en la noche ('A guitar in the night'), sweetly harmonized with comments and songs.

== Works ==
Eladio is the author of many famous songs such as:

- "Lucerito alba" (Little morning star)
- "Noches guaireñas" (Nights of Guaira)
- "Cayé"
- "Che trigueñami"
- "Che pykasumi"
- "A mi Corrientes porâ" (To my beautiful Corrientes)
- "Che vallemi" (My little town)
- "Nelly"
- "Oración a mi amada" (Prayer to my love)
- "Lejana flor" (Distant flower)
- "Es linda nuestra tierra" (Is beautiful our land)
- The Paraguayan zarzuela "Pacholi", with script from Manuel Frutos Pane.

He also recompiled very old "compuestos" (popular musical compositions that relates historical or satirical facts as a song) just like "El casamiento del taravé" and "Mateo Gamarra".
