= Jorge "Lobito" Martínez =

Jorge Eladio Martínez Ayala
- Also known as: Lobito
- Born: Jorge Eladio Martínez Ayala; May 11, 1952; Asunción, Py
- Died: January 10, 2003 (aged 50) Asunción, Py
- Occupation: Musician

Jorge "lobito" Martinez (May 11, 1952 in Asunción, Paraguay – January 10, 2003 in Asunción, Paraguay) a Paraguayan musician, son of the singer, guitarist, composer, and folklorist Eladio Martínez and Aida Ayala.

== First steps ==
He studied piano with Margarita Morosoli de Picardo from age 6 to 11, and then with Nelly Jimenez, Pedro Burian and at the Leonor Aranda's High Pianistic Studies Institute. His harmony teachers were Luis Cañete and Carlos Schwartzman.

From age 22 and until 1983 he was part of the pop group "Los Aftermad's;" with them he recorded many albums, including songs written by him. In the 80s he was part of the jazz group "Opus 572," and he mostly offered classic piano recitals on his own.

== Career ==
| Year | Stand out activity |
|---|---|
| 1986 | He spent a week in a musical clinic in Buenos Aires, from the Berklee College of Music, making a decisive impression to get a scholarship to continue his studies in the central of this World Wide famous music institution in Boston, United States |
| 1988 | A Fulbright scholarship allowed him to study at the Berklee College of Music in Boston, where he graduated in jazz performance, composition, arrangements and improvisations. |
| 1991 | He was assigned headline teacher of the Berklee College piano department, where he developed the subject of "Music with Latin rhythms" for two more years. He was awarded the "Count Basie" From the Argentina's Berklee Summer School award. |
| Middle 90s | He came back to Paraguay, where he offered piano recitals, and dedicated to teaching and composition. |
| 1997 | He directed orchestras for the national editions of the OTI Festival (Iberoamerican Television Organization). He also coordinated and directed the release of CDs of Paraguayan music made by the prestigious Paraguayan morning newspaper ABC Color. |
| 1998 | At the request of the Sower Group (main referent of the movement called "New Popular Paraguayan Song book"), the Philomusical Orchestra directed by Luis Szarán and the Paraguayan Choir directed by Luis Luccini Rivas, he was part of a memorable recital cycle in the CPJ (Paraguayan Japanese Center) in Asuncion. As a result of having "Lobito Martínez" as main musician, the journal ABC Color released many thousands of copies of a CD called "En las colinas del alma" (in the soul hills) commemorating the 25th anniversary of the Sower Group. "En las Colinas del alma" was a very anthological review of the popular Paraguayan songs of all times. |

== Discography ==
Among his main works:

- “Canto para ti” (I sing for you) y “Que más da”(Whatever), recorded by “Los Aftermad’s”,
- “Carola”, recorded by Andrés Boiarsky in Buenos Aires, in 1986;
- The soundtrack of the movie "El portón de los sueños" (the dream gate), from filmmaker Hugo Gamarra, about the life of Augusto Roa Bastos;
- "Juego de niños" (children's game) (1995) is the title of a CD leaned toward folkloric music with an obvious jazz influence, which broadcasts more of his creative talent ("Avy`a jave" and "Navidad,") and presents new versions of all-time Paraguayan classics, like "Asunción" by Federico Riera song dedicated to Paraguay's capital.

== Last years ==
He died at the age of 50, murdered, in January 2003.
