= Paraguayan National Anthem =

National anthem of Paraguay

Himno Nacional Paraguayo Tetã Paraguái Momorãhéi
English: Paraguayan National Anthem
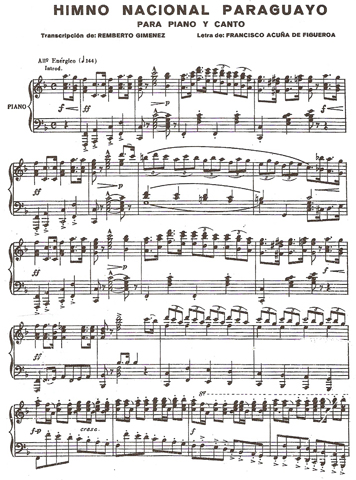
- National anthem of Paraguay
- Also known as: Paraguayos, ¡República o Muerte! (English: Paraguayans, Republic or Death!)
- Lyrics: Francisco Acuña de Figueroa, 1846
- Music: Francesco Casale, 1850s (arranged by Remberto Giménez, 1933)
- Adopted: 1846

Audio sample
- U.S. Navy Band instrumental version (intro, one verse and chorus): file; help

The "Paraguayan National Anthem" (Spanish: Himno Nacional Paraguayo, lit. 'Paraguayan national hymn') was officially adopted on 20 May 1846. The lyrics were written by Francisco Acuña de Figueroa under the presidency of Carlos Antonio López, who at the time delegated Bernardo Jovellanos and Anastasio González to ask Figueroa to write the anthem. The original composer of the song remains unclear, although the music is often attributed to Francesco Casale. Remberto Giménez rearranged the melody in 1933.

The author of the lyrics also wrote the lyrics to the "Uruguayan National Anthem".

== History ==
It still remains unclear who was responsible for the creation of the music. Some sources claim that Frenchman Francisco Sauvageot de Dupuis was the composer, while others claim it to be the work of the Hungarian-born Francisco José Debali (Hungarian: Debály Ferenc József), who composed the music for the Uruguayan national anthem. What it is known for sure is that it was the Paraguayan composer Remberto Giménez who in 1933 arranged and developed the version of the national anthem that remains in use by Paraguay today.

== Lyrics ==
Though the national anthem has many verses, usually only the first verse followed by the chorus are sung on most occasions. Due to the song's length, the wordless introductory section and the latter half of the first verse are often omitted for brevity when the national anthem is played before a sporting event such as a soccer game.

Spanish original

I
A los pueblos de América, infausto
tres centurias un cetro oprimió,
mas un día soberbia surgiendo,
"¡Basta!" —dijo, y el cetro rompió.
Nuestros padres, lidiando grandiosos,
ilustraron su gloria marcial;
𝄆 y trozada la augusta diadema,
enalzaron el gorro triunfal. 𝄇

Coro:
Paraguayos, ¡República o Muerte!
nuestro brío nos dio libertad;
𝄆 ni opresores, ni siervos alientan
donde reinan unión e igualdad, 𝄇
𝄆 unión e igualdad. 𝄇

II
Nueva Roma, la Patria ostentará
dos caudillos de nombre y valer,
que rivales —cual Rómulo y Remo—
dividieron gobierno y poder.
Largos años —cual Febo entre nubes—
viose oculta la perla del Sud.
Hoy un héroe grandioso aparece
realzando su gloria y virtud...

III
Con aplauso la Europa y el Mundo
la saludan, y aclaman también;
de heroísmo: baluarte invencible,
de riquezas: magnífico Edén.
Cuando entorno rugió la Discordia
que otros Pueblos fatal devoró,
paraguayos, el suelo sagrado
con sus alas un ángel cubrió.

IV
¡Oh! cuán pura, de lauro ceñida,
dulce Patria te ostentas así
En tu enseña se ven los colores
del zafiro, diamante y rubí.
En tu escudo que el sol ilumina,
bajo el gorro se mira el león.
Doble imagen de fuertes y libres,
y de glorias, recuerdo y blasón.

V
De la tumba del vil feudalismo
se alza libre la Patria deidad;
opresores, ¡doblad rodilla!,
compatriotas, ¡el Himno entonad!
Suene el grito: "¡República o muerte!",
nuestros pechos lo exhalen con fe,
y sus ecos repitan los montes
cual gigantes poniéndose en pie.

VI
Libertad y justicia defiende
nuestra Patria; tiranos, ¡oíd!
de sus fueros la carta sagrada
su heroísmo sustenta en la lid.
Contra el mundo, si el mundo se opone,
Si intentare su prenda insultar,
batallando vengar la sabremos
o abrazo con ella expirar.

VII
Alza, oh Pueblo, tu espada esplendente
que fulmina destellos de Dios,
no hay más medio que libre o esclavo
y un abismo divide a los dos.
En las auras el Himno resuene,
repitiendo con eco triunfal:
¡a los libres perínclita gloria!,
¡a la Patria laurel inmortal!

English translation

I
The peoples of the Americas, unfortunately,
Were oppressed for three centuries by a scepter
But one magnificent day surging forth,
"Enough!", it said, and the scepter was broken.
Our fathers, grandiose in battle,
Showed their martial glory;
𝄆 And after smashing the august diadem,
The triumphal cap was raised. 𝄇

Chorus:
Paraguayans: Republic or Death!
Our spirit gave us liberty
𝄆 Neither oppressors nor slaves exist
Where union and equality reign, 𝄇
𝄆 union and equality. 𝄇

II
A new Rome, the Fatherland shall proudly display
Two leaders of name and valor
Who, rivals, like Romulus and Remus
Divided government and power.
These long years when, during which Phoebus in the clouds
Saw darken the pearl of the South,
Today a grand hero appears
Raising up again her glory and virtue...

III
Europe and the entire world to her
Gives salutes and also acclaimations
To that invincible bastion of heroism,
The magnificent Eden of riches.
(But) when discord rumbled all around
Which fatally devoured other Peoples,
Paraguayans, the sacred ground
Was covered by an angel with its wings.

IV
Oh, how pure, of laurel girded
Sweet Fatherland, in this manner you show yourself.
In your ensign one sees the colors
Of sapphire, diamond, and ruby.
In your coat of arms, which the Sun illuminates,
Under the cap, one sees the lion.
Double image of the strong and the free,
And of glories, the memory and crest.

V
From the tomb of vile feudalism
The national Deity rises free;
Oppressors, bend your knees!
Compatriots, entone the hymn!
Sound the cry, "Republic or death"!
Our breasts exhale it with faith,
And the mountains repeat its echoes
Like giants arising in the land.

VI
Our Fatherland defends liberty and justice;
So tyrants: listen!
The laws in its sacred charter
Will sustain its heroism in the fight.
Against the world, if the world opposes it,
If the world dares to insult her security,
Battling to avenge we shall know her
Or die embracing her.

VII
Arise, oh People, your splendid sword
That strikes with sparkles of God,
There is no middle ground between free or slave
And an abyss divides the two.
In the gentle breezes the Hymn resounds,
Repeating with triumphal echo:
For the free, renowned glory!
For the Fatherland, immortal laurel!

Guarani lyrics

Tetã nguéra Amerikayguápe
tetãma pytagua ojopy,
sapy'ánte, japáy ñapu'ãvo,
Ha'evéma!... ja'e ha opa.
Ñande ru orairõ pu'akápe,
verapy marã'ỹva oipyhy;
𝄆 ha ojoka omondoho itasã,
poguypópe oiko ko tetã. 𝄇

Coro:
Joyke'y paraguái, iporãma,
anive máramo ñañesũ;
𝄆 mbarete ha tĩndy ndaijavéiri
oĩhápe joja ha joayhu, 𝄇
𝄆 joja ha joayhu. 𝄇
