= Agustín Barboza =

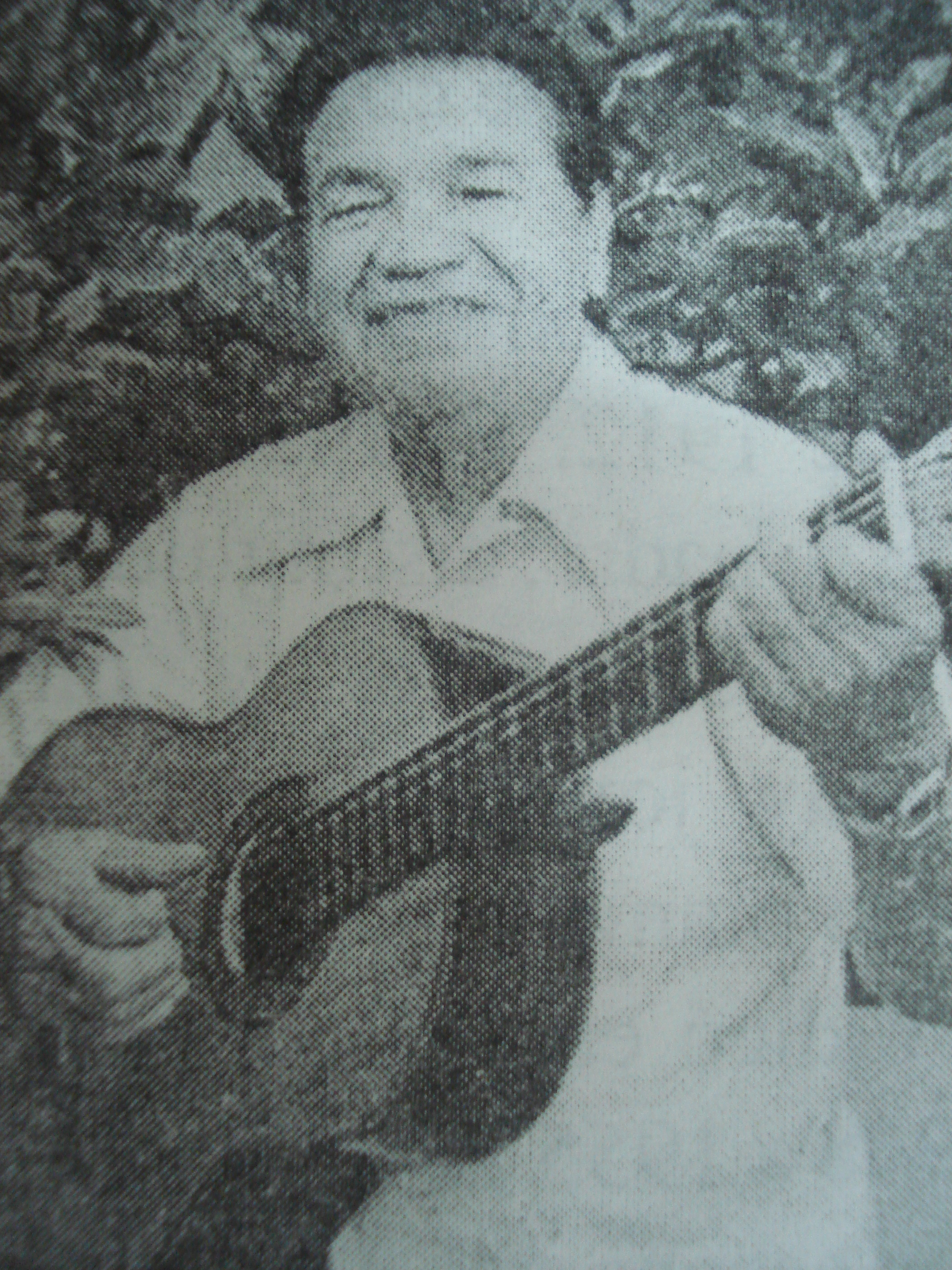

Background information
- Born: Agustín Pío Barboza; 5 May 1913; Asunción, Paraguay
- Died: 18 December 1998 (aged 85) Asunción, Paraguay
- Genres: Guarania
- Occupations: Singer, composer
- Years active: 1998
- Label: Philips

Agustín Pío Barboza (5 May 1913 – 18 December 1998) was a Paraguayan singer and composer.

== Biography ==
=== Childhood and youth ===
Barboza was born in Asunción, Paraguay. While still an adolescent in 1929, he went to Buenos Aires to work as a seaman aboard the Mixu, a ship flying the Argentine flag. Alternating his work of seaman with musical activities, he met Basilio Melgarejo Molinas (“Melga”). They formed a duo and later formed the trio of Melgarejo-Barboza-Feliu.

=== First steps ===
In Buenos Aires, he worked with other singers such as Samuel Aguayo, Emilio Bobadilla Cáceres and Diosnel Chase. He served as a soloist in the orchestras of Francisco Alvarenga, Juan Escobar and Julián Alarcón, the last two served as his mentors. In 1933, he sang with José Asunción Flores; a year later he recorded “Ñasaindype” with Flores based on a poem by Felix Fernandez. It was the first “Guarania (music)” ever recorded. He was also a soloist with “Orchestra Ortiz Guerrero”, a noted orchestra consisting of José Bragato, Aniceto Vera Ibarrola, Emilio Bobadilla Cáceres, Gumersindo Ayala Aquino, and others, directed by Flores. In 1943, he returned to Paraguay, with Jose Asuncion Flores, Francisco Alvarenga, and Emilio Vaesken. They were invited to participate in Asuncion's Foundation Day parade on August 15.

He also formed a trio with Felix Perez Cardozo and Eulogio Cardozo. In 1944, he continued his studies in the Music School of Rio de Janeiro University, thanks to a scholarship granted by the government. He also gave concerts and auditions in theaters and on radio. During this time, he studied with Carlos Lara Bareiro, who encouraged him to travel and help to popularize Paraguayan music.

=== Travels and popularity ===
In 1947, he traveled from Brazil to Mexico, where he was invited by Gumersindo Ayala Aquino to join the group “Los Guaireños”, with Luis Alberto del Paraná, Digno Garcia and Humberto Barua. They played in Mexico, Cuba and throughout Central America. In the early 1950s, he went on tour through the northern countries of South America and Central America, Mexico, the United States and Europe, as a soloist or with various groups.

In 1954, Luis Alberto del Paraná asked him to join the “Trio Los Paraguayos”, with the harpist Digno Garcia. In Europe, they signed a contract with Philips, a Dutch record company. This relationship lasted for many years. They were dubbed the “ambassadors of Paraguayan music”.

In 1957 he organized his own group “Barboza y sus compañeros”, with Ramón Mendoza, Leonardo Figueroa and Carlos Centurion, continuing to spread his work through Europe and the Middle East.

In 1962, after settling in Paraguay, he got married la singer, Yvera (Francisca Zayas), forming an artistic couple. In 1968, while in Europe, they formed the group “Los Barboza”. They recorded three long plays and did presentations on radio, television, in theaters, schools, universities and public entertainment houses. Their daughter, Diana Barboza, also loved popular singing and joined the family group in 1988.

In 1994, the government conferred on Barboza the National Order of Merit award, for his work dedicated to the composition and the spreading of Paraguayan music.

In 1996 he wrote an anthological autobiographical book named Ruego y Camino.

== Last years ==
In 1997 the national congress granted him the National Award of Music in the popular music category, for his work “Mi patria soñada”, that has verses by Carlos Miguel Gimenez.

In 1998, on turning 85 years old and celebrating 70 years of his musical career, he released a discography with the orchestration of his work. The Master, Oscar Cardozo Ocampo, (distinguished musical arranger living in Argentina, son of the great Paraguayan composer and creator Mauricio Cardozo Ocampo) provided the instrumental accompaniment. He received unanimous accolades from his fellow countrymen.

== Other works ==
Barboza wrote approximately 80 compositions, among the following are noteworthy: “Alma vibrante”, “Flor de Pilar”, “Mi patria soñada”, “Sobre el Corazón de mi guitarra”, “Muchachita campesina” and “Mis joyas de Buenos Aires” (with verses from the poet Carlos Miguel Gimenez), “Dulce tierra mía”, “Serenata”, “Viva la vida, viva el amor” and “Muchacha dorada” (over words by Augusto Roa Bastos), “Oimeva che roga”, “Oñomdiovemi” and “Reservista purahei” (with Félix Fernández), from his own production, lyrics and music, “Emociones de mi tierra” and “Ruego y camino”, “Sombras de ausencia” (with Enrique Ganoso), “Voz del viejo río” (with Aníbal Romero).
