= Florentín Giménez =

Paraguayan pianist and composer (1925–2021)

- Born: 14 March 1925; Ybycuí, Paraguay
- Died: 11 March 2021 (aged 95); Asunción, Paraguay
- Known for: Pianist and composer
- Notable work: Minas Cué; El río de la esperanza Perúrima

Florentín Giménez (14 March 1925 – 11 March 2021) was a Paraguayan pianist and composer.

== Biography ==
Giménez was born in Ybycuí, Paraguarí Department. In his teens, he learned to play the drums and became a member of the Orchestra of Popular Music, directed by Severo Rodas. In 1945, at the age of 20, he learned to play the piano and became a pianist in Ramón Reyes’ Orchestra, where he stayed until 1947, when the Paraguayan Civil War forced him to leave the country and settle in Argentina. After the war, he returned to Paraguay and formed his first orchestra, “Ritmos de América” (America’s Rhythms).

In 1950, he formed the 14-member orchestra “Florentín Giménez y su típica Moderna”, which featured singers Oscar Escobar, Juan Carlos Miranda, Carlos Centurión, and Jorge Alonso. The group toured extensively in Argentina. During this same period, he formed an orchestra dedicated solely to folk music.

Because of his protests against the government, Giménez was labeled a communist and arrested in 1953. He was jailed for several months. Upon his release, he signed a contract to play with his orchestra in more than 80 Brazilian cities, but the government refused to allow him to leave the country. In 1956, Giménez left Paraguay.

Among his symphonic works are “Minas cué”, “El río de la esperanza”, “Ciclos”, “Fantasía Étnica”, and “Misa Paraguaya”. He has also composed music for plays and films.

He died from COVID-19 during the COVID-19 pandemic in Paraguay, three days short from his 96th birthday.
