= Francisco Acuña de Figueroa =

Uruguayan author (1791–1862)

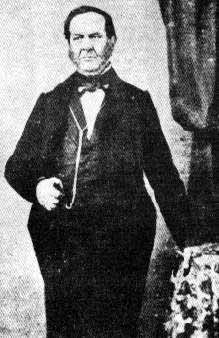
- Francisco Acuña de Figueroa
- Born: Francisco Acuña de Figueroa; July 20, 1790; Montevideo, Viceroyalty of the River Plate
- Died: October 6, 1862 (aged 72); Montevideo, Uruguay
- Occupations: Writer, poet

Francisco Esteban Acuña de Figueroa (September 3, 1791 – October 6, 1862) was a Uruguayan poet and writer. He was born in Montevideo, on September 3, 1791 and died on October 6, 1862. He was the son of the Treasurer of the Royal Treasury, Jacinto Acuña de Figueroa.

== Education and career ==
Acuña's father sent him to study in Buenos Aires, Argentina. His early education was at the Convent of San Bernardino, and he completed his studies in Buenos Aires at the Royal College of San Carlos, from which returned in 1810, prompted by the invasion of the city, having pursued studies in Arts. He returned to Montevideo, where he wrote poems while working for his father. There was no printing press in Montevideo, so none of his works were published at that time.

He went on to become the author of the words of the national anthems of Uruguay and Paraguay. He did not subscribe to the independence cause, but remained loyal to the colonial governments of Francisco Javier Elío and Gaspar de Vigodet, and after Montevideo fell in 1814, at 25 years old, he was exiled to the Portuguese Court in Rio de Janeiro, where he performed diplomatic functions for Spain. His father, on the other hand, remained in Montevideo, where he was confirmed in office by the new government because of his capacity for the job.

He returned to Montevideo in 1818, after the fall of José Artigas, the city falling under Portuguese rule, under which it would remain. Besides his literary work, he occupied posts such as state treasurer (succeeding his father), a member of the committee on the censorship of theatrical works (in 1846), and director of the Public Library and Museum (1840–1847).

== Works ==
In 1857, Acuña's poems were published in a book, and the national anthem of Uruguay, which dates from 1833, appeared. Acuña also had an extensive literary work, compiled by himself in 1848 and published posthumously in 1890 in 12 volumes under the general title of "Complete Works". It consists of numerous poems, stories, etc. Many of his works have a strong satirical tone.

An anthology of his poems was published in 1965 in the collection of Uruguayan classics by the Artigas Library.

One of his most curious poems is the Salve Multiforme (Multiform Salve), about which the author says: Salve Multiforme has two applications, two different objectives. The first, most essential and specific objective is purely religious, the second has a secular or political application. Under that first aspect it is a tribute of veneration and applause inexhaustible to the divine queen of heaven, it is the prayer of the Salve presented and reproducible in almost infinite ways: so many that many millions of years of continuous and incessant reading would not be enough to complete all possible paraphrases of this more or less diverse prayer, which, according to this method, can be formed. (...) The author has divided the salve into 44 fragments, placed successively in as many columns, numbered from 1 to 44.

Each fragment has, in its own column, 26 paraphrases of itself, or at least similar related words, and combined with any of the 27 fragments of the preceding and subsequent columns, without breaking the sense of the Salve, which always maintains its grammatical syntax, without repeating, in an entire Salve, a fragment already used in it. (...) As a result, therefore, taking at random any fragment from the 1st column, another one from the 2nd, another from the 3rd., etc.., continuing that way up to column 44, a complete paraphrase of the salve will always be formed, perhaps elegant, perhaps weak, but never inappropriate or incoherent in its meaning.

Having, therefore, 27 fragments in the 1st column, freely combined with any of the following 27 and these with the successive column, and so progressively and mutually with the other columns, it is evident that millions upon millions of Salves can be combined and merged, more or less differently, i.e., with more or fewer differences among fragments. On reaching column 44 the word amen is added, which is in the last or supplementary column, to properly end each of the prayers.

Acuña also wrote the lyrics for the national anthem of Paraguay. He died in Montevideo on October 6, 1862.

== See also ==
- National Anthem of Uruguay
- List of Uruguayan writers
