= Julián Alarcón =

Paraguayan composer and violinist

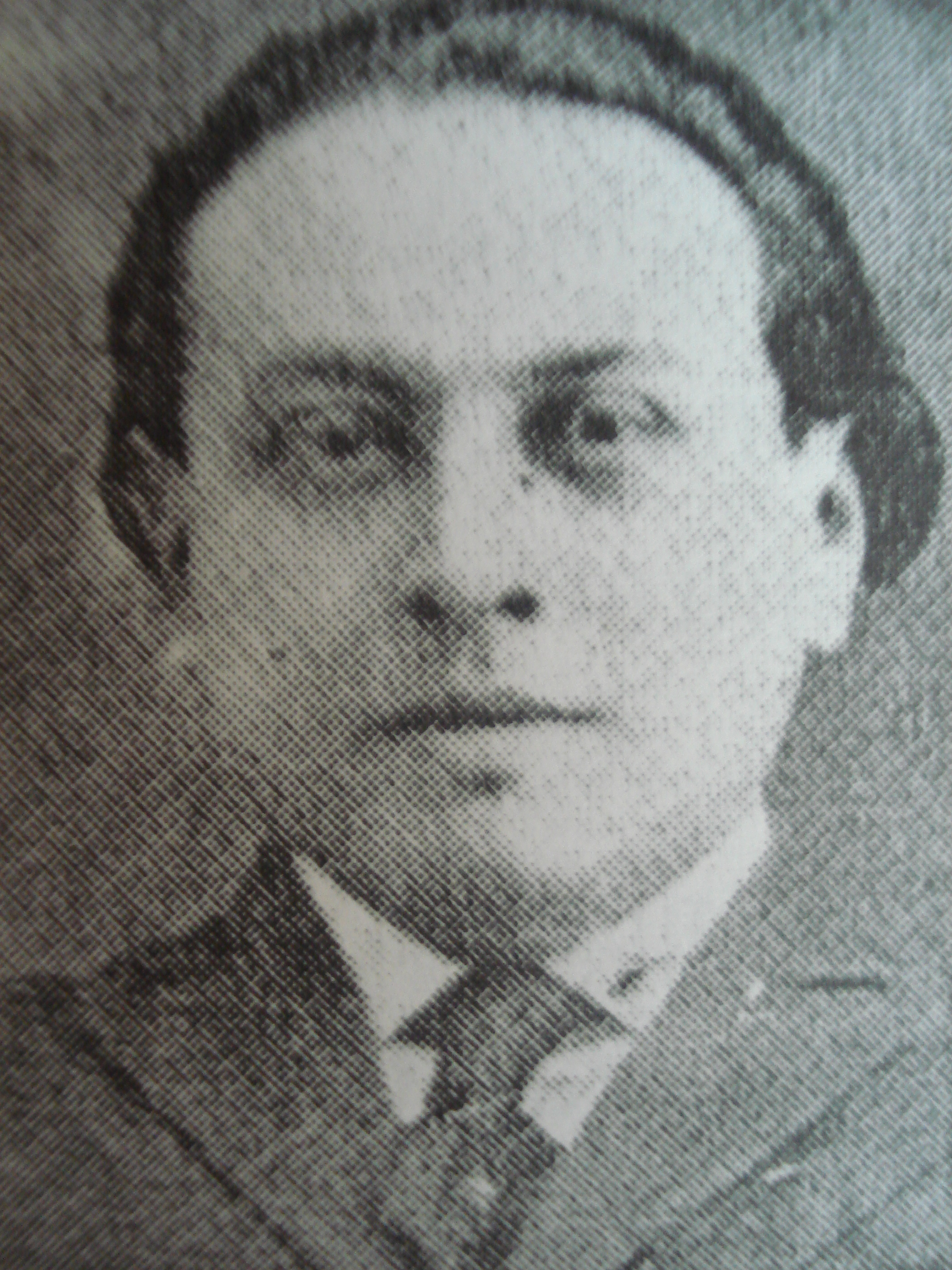
- Born: Julián Alarcón; 28 January 1888; Asunción, Paraguay
- Died: 19 August 1957 (aged 69); Asunción, Paraguay
- Known for: Musician
- Notable work: Serenata clásica, Nanawa

Julián Alarcón (28 January 1888 – 19 August 1957) was a Paraguayan composer and violinist.

== Biography ==
Alarcón was born in Asunción.

Beginning in 1909, Alarcón studied guitar and violin at the Paraguayan Gymnasium. In 1913, he traveled to Montevideo, Uruguay to continue his studies. In 1919, Alarcón edited an album consisting of Paraguayan folk songs.

Alarcón worked as a musician for more than 20 years in Argentina and Brazil. He formed the “Guaraní Trio,” along with members Carlos S. Caballero and Manuel Moreno.

In 1942, he won the Paraguayan Atheneum's Compositioning prize with his song “Abandonada” ("Abandoned", in English). In 1950, he won the Ministry of Education and Culture's contest with “Ka’avovei”.

He died at Asunción in 1957.

== Work ==
Alarcón composed an estimated 300 songs. His more popular songs include: “Serenata clásica”, “Nanawa” (a patriotic polka), “3 de mayo” (a folkloric anthem of Paraguay), “Nde resa kuarahy’ame” (A love song with lyrics from Teodoro S. Mongelós), “Recuerdos del Paraguay”, “Sábado ka’aru”, “Alegre amanecer”, “Ha Paraguay”, “Zorzal del Paraguay”, “Tesa yvoty”, “Serenata”, “Marave ndoikói” and “Loma Clavel”.
