= Francisco José Debali =

Hungarian musician (1791–1859)

Francisco José Debali (26 July 1791 – 13 January 1859), born Debály Ferenc József, was a Hungarian-born composer who emigrated to Uruguay in 1838. He authored the national anthem of Uruguay and, possibly, the tune to Paraguayos, República o Muerte, which became the Paraguayan anthem. (See National Anthem of Uruguay#Music.)

== Name ==
As ethnic Hungarian, his original Eastern order name was Debály Ferenc József. His Christian names were later in Uruguay translated into the Spanish version, but his surname is known to be spelled as Debali, de Bali, Debáli, Debály and Debally.

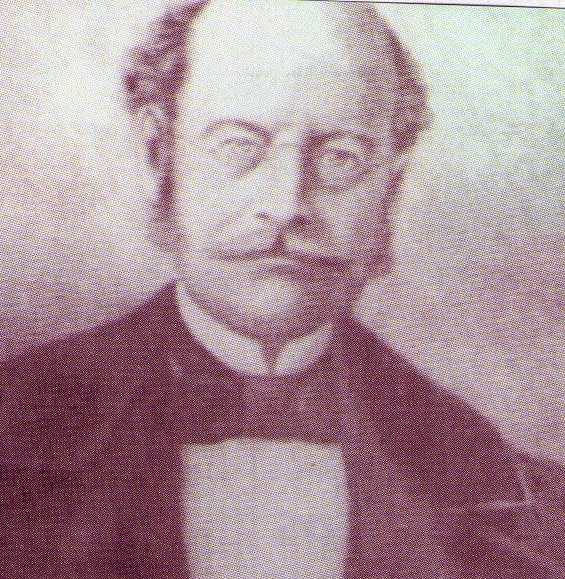
Francisco José Debali.

== Life ==
He was an Austrian subject born in Oltenia ("Lesser Wallachia").

He played the oboe. In 1820, he went abroad to pursue his musical career in the Kingdom of Sardinia. There, in Alessandria, he married Magdalena Bagnasco, from Genoa. They had several children, some of whom were born in Uruguay. After a short stay at São Paulo, Brazil, from which he departed due to a yellow fever epidemic, he arrived in Uruguay in 1838. Here he was the director of the orchestra at the Sala de Comedias in Montevideo from 1841-48.

=== National Anthem of Uruguay ===
In 1845 he composed what would be adopted three years later as the Uruguayan national anthem, to a text by Francisco Acuña de Figueroa. It was played for the first time in public on July 19, 1845. Fernando Quijano, his assistant, who had submitted the composition to the government's selecting contest, was credited with the authorship because of Debali's failure to grasp the content, in the Spanish language, of the governmental decree that adopted his composition as the country's anthem.
