= Antonio Galassi =

Italian opera singer (died 1904)

Antonio F. Galassi (or Antoine Galassi) (c. 1845–1904) was an Italian baritone who made his New York City debut at Academy of Music during its 1878–79 season and remained there through 1884. He was considered a great baritone, popular and fiery, right until 1883 when, according to some sources, he lost his voice during performance of I Puritani. Although later on he still performed occasionally (mostly during concerts), even in 1890s, his voice was no longer as great as before.
