= Juan Nepomucino Goetz =

- Johannes Nepomuk Goetz
- Occupation(s): Catholic priest, Professor of Philosophy

Juan Nepomucino Goetz (German: Johannes Nepomuk Goetz) was an Austrian Catholic priest whose arrival in Cuba led to two extraordinary controversies.

When Toussaint-Louverture drove out the British, he rang the church bells and celebrated. However, in the following period, Goetz fled to Santiago de Cuba, where his knowledge of languages gave him a place as the 'foreigners' priest.

== Goetz in Havana ==
In Havana, choirmaster Lazo de la Vega was ailing and died. After his death, four men sought the post: 28-year-old first violinist José Francisco Rensoli, singer Luis Lazo, maestro Cayetano Solis and the Catalan Cayetano Pagueras, a religious composer and first contralto. The matter was to be decided by competitive examination. Pagueras regarded himself as a maestro in four arts: plainsong, organ playing, counterpoint and composition.

All were set for the examination when a letter, written on 29 July 1803, arrived at the cathedral. It was from Goetz, offering his service.

After looking, listening and questioning, he wrote a first report to the town council full of acute assessments of key members of the choir:

"Cayetano Pagueras: Second contralto, terrible voice, no expressiveness. Almost blind... A good composer, but he doesn't know how to sing his own works."
"Don Luis Lazo: Third contralto. Knows nothing of music, and never will. He entered the chapel fraudulently, and... is totally inept; superfluous."
"Don Juan Alcayado: Third tenor. Terrible voice. He hardly attends, and when he does, he speaks constantly, disturbing the others... A totally useless human being. The position of third tenor is hereby abolished for its superfluousness."

As a musician, he reduced the number of positions, moved young singers up in status and recommended that any reduced in rank should retake the exam, both theoretical and practical. Under his plan in 1806, the singers and musicians were: choirmaster, four sopranos, two contraltos, two tenors, a baritone; two clarinets, two bassoons, two horns, four violins, bass viol, and bass.
