= National Anthem of Uruguay =

Himno Nacional del Uruguay
English: National Anthem of Uruguay
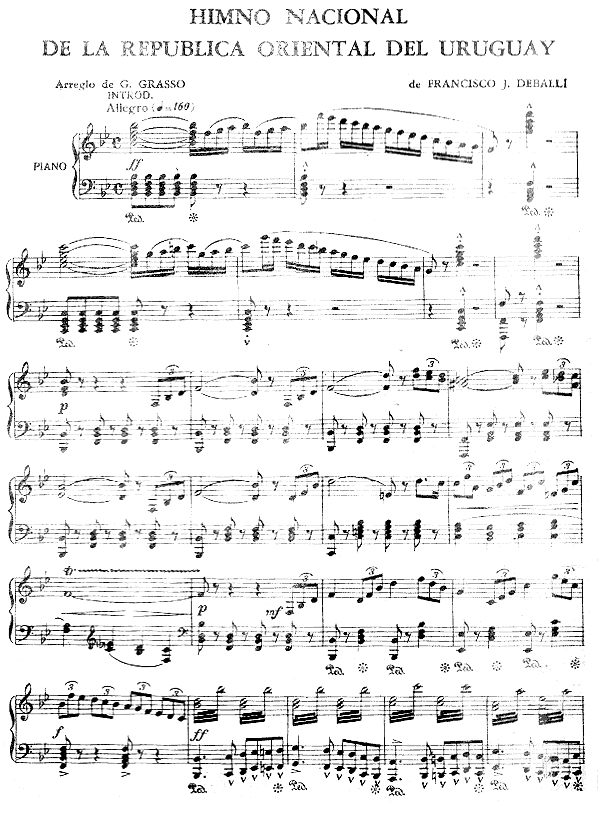
- National anthem of Uruguay
- Also known as: Orientales, la Patria o la Tumba (English: Easterners, the Fatherland or the grave (Note: The people of Uruguay are commonly referred to in Spanish as orientales, meaning 'easterners'.))
- Lyrics: Francisco Acuña de Figueroa, 1830
- Music: Francisco José Debali, 1845
- Adopted: 1833

Audio sample
- National Anthem of Uruguay (complete, instrumental): file; help

The "Himno Nacional del Uruguay" (English: "National Anthem of Uruguay"), also known by its incipit "Orientales, la Patria o la Tumba" (English: "Easterners, the Country or the Tomb"), is the longest national anthem in terms of duration with 105 bars of music. When performed in its entirety, the anthem lasts about four-and-a-half to six minutes, although nowadays only the chorus is sung (intro included) on most occasions, such as before sporting events.

Its martial lyrics were written by the Uruguayan poet Francisco Acuña de Figueroa in 1830, who also wrote the lyrics for Paraguay's national anthem, "Paraguayos, República o Muerte". The lyrics were officially declared the national anthem in July 1833. Several proposed musical settings failed to gain public support. The Rossini-inspired music that eventually became universally associated with the anthem was composed by the Hungarian-born composer Francisco José Debali, with the assistance of Fernando Quijano, a Uruguayan actor and musician. A few days after the first performance in July 1845, Debali's score was officially recognized as the music for the anthem. As with other South American national anthems, the music was inspired by the local popularity of Italian opera. It includes several references to La Cenerentola and other operas by Rossini, as well as a direct musical quotation from Lucrezia Borgia by Gaetano Donizetti.

The French composer Camille Saint-Saëns is sometimes erroneously credited with having composed the music: although he was requested to write a hymn to celebrate the national independence day, his composition never became the national anthem.

== History ==
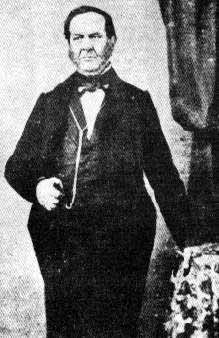
Francisco Acuña de Figueroa (1791–1862), the Uruguayan poet who wrote the lyrics.

The Uruguayan poet Francisco Acuña de Figueroa, who also wrote the lyrics for Paraguay's national anthem "Paraguayos, República o Muerte", was responsible for the martial lyrics. On 8 July 1833, Orientales, la Patria o la Tumba was officially recognized as Uruguay's national anthem.

Several proposed musical settings of Figueroa's lyrics failed to gain public support. One of the discarded settings was by the Spanish-born composer Antonio Sáenz. A proposed melody by the Italian composer Francesco Casale became the basis for the music of the Paraguay national anthem.

The Rossini-inspired music that eventually became universally associated with the anthem was composed by the Hungarian-born composer Francisco José Debali, with the assistance of Fernando Quijano, a Uruguayan actor and musician. The score was first performed on 19 July 1845, and it was officially recognized as the music for the anthem on 25 July 1848.

== Music ==
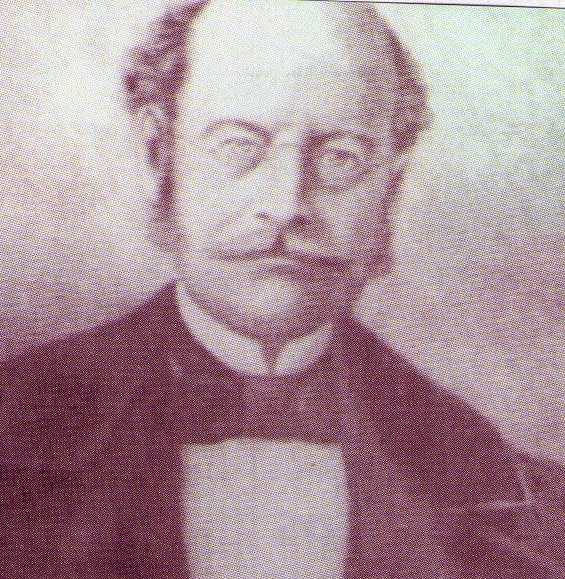
Francisco José Debali (born Debály Ferenc József, 1791 – 1859) was a Hungarian-born composer who emigrated to Uruguay in 1838 after previously working in the Kingdom of Sardinia and Turin.

As with every other South American national anthem, the music was inspired by the local popularity of Italian opera. The full 105-bar version of the anthem evokes an operatic scena e aria for soloist and chorus (almost in solita forma manner, with a cabaletta-like conclusion). Debali had conducted in many productions of operas by Gioachino Rossini and Gaetano Donizetti in Montevideo, and during the course of the anthem he makes several musical references to Rossini's La Cenerentola, as well as to Largo al factotum from The Barber of Seville, and to a chorus from Semiramide. A further passage is clearly borrowed from the ending of the Prologue of Donizetti's Lucrezia Borgia.

Of note, the music for the Uruguayan national anthem is sometimes erroneously attributed to Camille Saint-Saëns. It is true that during a visit to Uruguay in April 1916 Saint-Saëns was commissioned to write a hymn to celebrate the national independence day. However, circumstances prevented the work, Partido colorado, (Note: Some uncertainty surrounds the actual existence of this work, which is not listed in the New Grove catalogue.) from becoming the national anthem.

U.S. Navy Band instrumental version (short)

U.S. Navy Band instrumental version (short with intro)

1930s orchestral and vocal rendition

== Lyrics ==
=== Lyrics as sung ===
Spanish original

Coro:
𝄆 ¡Orientales, la Patria o la Tumba!
¡Libertad o con gloria morir! 𝄇
¡Es el voto que el alma pronuncia,
Y que heroicos sabremos cumplir!
𝄆 ¡Es el voto que el alma pronuncia,
Y que heroicos sabremos cumplir!
¡Que sabremos cumplir! 𝄇
𝄆 ¡Sabremos cumplir! 𝄇
¡Sabremos cumplir!

I
𝄆 ¡Libertad, libertad, orientales!
Este grito a la Patria salvó.
Que a sus bravos en fieras batallas
De entusiasmo sublime inflamó. 𝄇
De este don sacrosanto la gloria
Merecimos: ¡tiranos, temblad!
𝄆 ¡Tiranos, temblad! 𝄇
Libertad en la lid clamaremos,
Y muriendo, ¡también libertad!
Libertad en la lid clamaremos,
𝄆 Y muriendo, ¡también libertad! 𝄇
𝄆 ¡También libertad! 𝄇

Coro

English translation

Chorus:
𝄆 Easterners, the Fatherland or the grave!
Freedom or with glory we die! 𝄇
It is the vow that the soul pronounces,
and which, heroically we will fulfill!
𝄆 It is the vow that the soul pronounces,
and which, heroically we will fulfill! 𝄇
Which we will fulfill!
𝄆 We will fulfill! 𝄇
We will fulfill!

I
𝄆 Freedom, Freedom, Easterners!
This cry saved the fatherland.
Which her brave warriors, in fierce battles
With sublime enthusiasm fill´d. 𝄇
From this sacred gift the glory we deserved
Tyrants: Tremble!
𝄆 Tyrants: Tremble! 𝄇
Freedom in combat we shall cry out!
And dying, Freedom too!
Freedom in combat we shall cry out!
𝄆 And dying, Freedom too! 𝄇
𝄆 Freedom too! 𝄇

Chorus

=== Full lyrics ===
Spanish original

Coro:
𝄆 ¡Orientales, la Patria o la Tumba!
¡Libertad o con gloria morir! 𝄇
𝄆 ¡Es el voto que el alma pronuncia,
Y que heroicos sabremos cumplir! 𝄇
¡Es el voto que el alma pronuncia,
Y que heroicos sabremos cumplir!

I
¡Libertad, libertad, orientales!
Este grito a la Patria salvó.
Que a sus bravos en fieras batallas
De entusiasmo sublime inflamó.
De este don sacrosanto, la gloria
merecimos: ¡tiranos, temblad!
Libertad en la lid clamaremos,
Y muriendo, ¡también libertad!

II
Dominado la Iberia dos mundos
Ostentaba su altivo poder,
Y a sus plantas cautivo yacía
El Oriente sin nombre ni ser:
Mas, repente sus hierros trozando
Ante el dogma que Mayo inspiró,
Entre libres, déspotas fieros,
Un abismo sin puente se vio.

III
Su trozada cadena por armas,
Por escudo su pecho en la lid,
De su arrojo soberbio temblaron
Los feudales campeones del Cid:
En los valles, montañas y selvas
Se acometen con muda altivez,
Retumbando con fiero estampido
Las cavernas y el cielo a la vez.

IV
El estruendo que en torno resuena
De Atahualpa la tumba se abrió,
Y batiendo sañudo las palmas
Su esqueleto, ¡venganza! gritó:
Los patriotas el eco grandioso
Se electrizan en fuego marcial,
Y en su enseña más vivo relumbra
De los Incas el Dios inmortal.

V
Largo tiempo, con varia fortuna,
Batallaron liberto, y señor,
Disputando la tierra sangrienta
Palmo a palmo con ciego furor.
La justicia, por último, vence
Domeñando las iras de un Rey;
Y ante el mundo la Patria indomable
Inaugura su enseña la ley.

VI
Orientales, mirad la bandera,
De heroísmo fulgente crisol;
Nuestras lanzas defienden su brillo,
¡Nadie insulte la imagen del Sol!
De los fueros civiles el goce
Sostengamos; y el código fiel
Veneremos inmune y glorioso
Como el arca sagrada Israel.

VII
Porque fuese más alta tu gloria,
Y brillasen tu precio y poder,
Tres diademas, oh Patria, se vieron
Tu dominio gozar, y perder.
Libertad, libertad adorada,
¡Mucho cuestas, tesoro sin par!
Pero valen tus goces divinos
Esa sangre que riega tu altar

VIII
Si a los pueblos un bárbaro agita,
Removiendo su extinto furor,
Fratricida discordia evitemos,
¡Diez mil tumbas recuerdan su horror!
Tempestades el Cielo fulmina,
maldiciones desciendan sobre él,
Y los libres adoren triunfante
de las leyes el rico joyel.

IX
De laureles ornada brillando
La Amazona soberbia del Sud,
En su escudo de bronce reflejan
Fortaleza, justicia y virtud.
Ni enemigos le humillan la frente,
Ni opresores le imponen el pie:
Que en angustias selló su constancia
Y en bautismo de sangre su fe.

X
Festejando la gloria, y el día
De la nueva República el Sol,
Con vislumbres de púrpura y oro,
Engalana su hermoso arrebol.
Del Olimpo la bóveda augusta
Resplandece, y un ser divinal
Con estrellas escribe en los cielos,
Dulce Patria, tu nombre inmortal.

XI
De las leyes el Numen juremos
Igualdad, patriotismo y unión,
Inmolando en sus aras divinas
Ciegos odios, y negra ambición.
Y hallarán los que fieros insulten
La grandeza del Pueblo Oriental,
Si enemigos, la lanza de Marte
Si tiranos, de Bruto el puñal.

Coro:
𝄆 ¡Orientales, la Patria o la Tumba,
Libertad o con gloria morir! 𝄇
𝄆 ¡Es el voto que el alma pronuncia,
Y que heroicos sabremos cumplir! 𝄇
¡Que sabremos cumplir!
¡Es el voto que el alma pronuncia,
Y que heroicos sabremos cumplir!

English translation

Chorus:
𝄆 Easterners, the Fatherland or the grave!
Liberty or with glory we die! 𝄇
𝄆 It is the vow that the soul pronounces,
and which, heroically we will fulfill! 𝄇
𝄆 It is the vow that the soul pronounces,
and which, heroically we will fulfill! 𝄇

I
Freedom, Freedom, Easterners!
This cry saved the fatherland.
That his bravery in fierce battles
Of sublime enthusiasm enflamed.
This sacred gift, of glory
we've deserved: tyrants tremble!
Freedom in battle we'll cry,
And in dying, freedom we'll shout!

II
Iberia worlds dominated
He wore his haughty power,
And their captive plants lay
The East nameless be
But suddenly his irons chopping
Given the dogma that May inspired
Among free despots fierce
A bridge saw pit.

III
His billet chain guns,
On his chest shield in battle,
In his superb courage trembled
The feudal champions of the Cid
In the valleys, mountains and jungles
Are undertaken with silent pride,
With fierce rumbling roar
The caves and the sky at once.

IV
The roar that sounded out from
Atahualpa as the tomb opened,
And furiously clapping hands,
His skeleton "Revenge!" shouted.
Patriots hearing the echo
Are electrified with martial fire,
The more brilliantly to illuminate
By the Incas, the immortal God.

V
Long, and with varying fortune,
The freedman battled, and Lord,
Disputing the bloody earth
Inch-by-inch with blind fury.
Justice finally overcomes.
Tamed is the wrath of a king;
And to the world the indomitable Homeland
Begins teaching rule of law.

VI
Easterners, look at the flag,
Shining crucible of heroism;
Our spears defend its brightness.
No one insults the image of the sun!
In the enjoyment of civil rights
let us uphold them; may our faithful Code
Be venerated, as timeless and glorious
As the holy ark of Israel.

VII
For your glory to be higher,
And Shine your price and power,
Three crowns, oh Fatherland, were
Your domain enjoy, and lose.
Freedom, freedom adored
Much treasure unparalleled slopes!
But they are worth your joys divine
That blood that irrigates your altar

VIII
If a barbarian people agitated,
Removing his late fury
Avoid fratricidal strife,
Ten thousand tombs recall the horror!
Heaven thunders storms,
curses upon him,
And the triumphant worship free
the law to rich jewel.

IX
Shining adorned with laurels
The pride of the South Amazon,
In his bronze shield reflect
Fortaleza, justice and virtue.
Enemies will not humiliate the front
Neither foot oppressors imposed
That sealed his record troubles
And baptism of blood in their faith.

X
Celebrating the glory and the day
Of the sun of this new republic
With glimpses of purple and gold,
Decks your beautiful glow.
The August dome of Olympus
Shines, and a divine being
With stars in the heavens writes,
Sweet Fatherland, your name immortal.

XI
The law to swear to Numen
Equality, patriotism and unity,
Sacrificing their divine order
Blind hatred, and black ambition.
And find that insulting fierce
The greatness of the Eastern People,
For the enemies, the spear of Mars,
For the tyrants the dagger of Brutus!

Chorus:
𝄆 Easterners, the Fatherland or the grave,
Liberty or with glory, we die! 𝄇
𝄆 Is the vote that the soul pronounces,
And which, heroically we will fulfill! 𝄇
We will fulfill!
Is the vote that the soul pronounces,
And which, heroically we will fulfill!
