= Fernando Quijano =

Uruguayan songwriter

Fernando Quijano (1805–1871) was a Uruguayan actor and songwriter.

== Noted achievements ==
He was the assistant of composer Francisco José Debali.

=== Uruguayan National Anthem ===
Quijano was credited with the authorship of the Uruguayan national anthem. This came about through the governmental decree that adopted Debali's composition as such in 1848.

== Death and reputation ==
Quijano's death in 1871 came 12 years after the death of his more eminent fellow- composer Debali, with whom he collaborated, but, given the facts that he lived longer than Debali in the young Oriental Republic of Uruguay and that Debali spoke little Spanish, these factors served to enhance his reputation.

== See also ==
- National Anthem of Uruguay#Music
