= Alexander Juhan =

Alexander Juhan (1765–1845) was a violinist, composer, and conductor. He was one of the first American composers of the United States. Thought to have been born in Charleston, South Carolina, Juhan moved to Philadelphia in 1783 where he worked with Henri Capron, Alexander Reinagle, and William Brown in Philadelphia from 1786 to 1794.
