= Ybycuí =

Ybycuí Yvyku'i
- Location within Paraguay
- Coordinates: 26°1′0″S 57°3′0″W
- Country: Paraguay
- Department: Paraguarí
- Founded: March 19, 1766

Government
  - Intendente Municipal: Eusebia Maria Del Carmen Benitez Diaz

Area
  - Total: 122 km^{2} (47 sq mi)
- Elevation: 70 m (230 ft)

Population (2008)
  - Total: 20.887 hab.
  - Density: 77/km^{2} (200/sq mi)
- Time zone: UTC−04:00
- Postal code: 4390
- Area code: (595) (534)

Ybycuí (Guarani: Yvyku'i) is a Paraguayan rural community of the department of Paraguari, located 120 km away from Asunción, and 40 km from Route 1.

== Toponimics ==
Its name means "Sandy" in Guaraní.

== Geography ==
Ybycuí is located 122 km away from Asunción.

=== Weather ===
The average year temperature is 21°C, with a maximum of 39°C and the minimum 2°C.

== Demographics ==
Ybycuí has a total of 20,887 inhabitants, of which 10,756 are male and 10,131 are female, according to the last census of 2002. In the urban area there are 4,630 people and in the rural area 16,257 people.

== Churches ==
San José church, the city patron.

== Schools ==
General Cesar Barrientos school is an important educational center of the region.

== Transport ==
Ybycuí is located 123 km from Asunción and 40 km from the Route 1 Marshal Francisco Solano López.

== Tourism ==
Ybycuí hosts an iron casting foundry as well as the repository of arms Minas Cue, named as La Rosada, which happen to be on duty in times of Don Carlos Antonio López, where arms and military tools were made, besides navy ships components of the Paraguayan navy. During the Paraguayan War, bullets and guns were made at Minas Cue, but the allied troops took it and destroyed it. Now at La Rosada, there is a museum where tools used at the time are shown, as well as guns which were manufactured there. La Rosada is inside the National Park of Ybycui. Inside the Park there is also the Salto Mina, also called Salto Cristal, where you can take long walks admiring the fauna and flora of the region, and through the paths you can get to the Salto Guaraní. In Ybycuí we can also appreciate the Pozo Tatacua, with unknown depth, resides the Paso Ita. The ancient home of Bernardino Caballero is a popular attraction among the tourist who want to know more of the Paraguayan history. The School Farm Mamorei wants to make the population realize about the importance of taking care of nature.

== Notable people ==
- Bernardino Caballero, born in Ybycui he is called the “Ybycui Centauros”. In the city, in his honor we have the Avenue and the National School”Gral Bernardino Caballero.
- Mauricio Cardozo Ocampo, musician and composer, poet, and director, he was born in 1907.
- Facundo Machaín, vice-president and the founder of the Medicine faculty.
