= Mazurkas, Op. 59 (Chopin) =

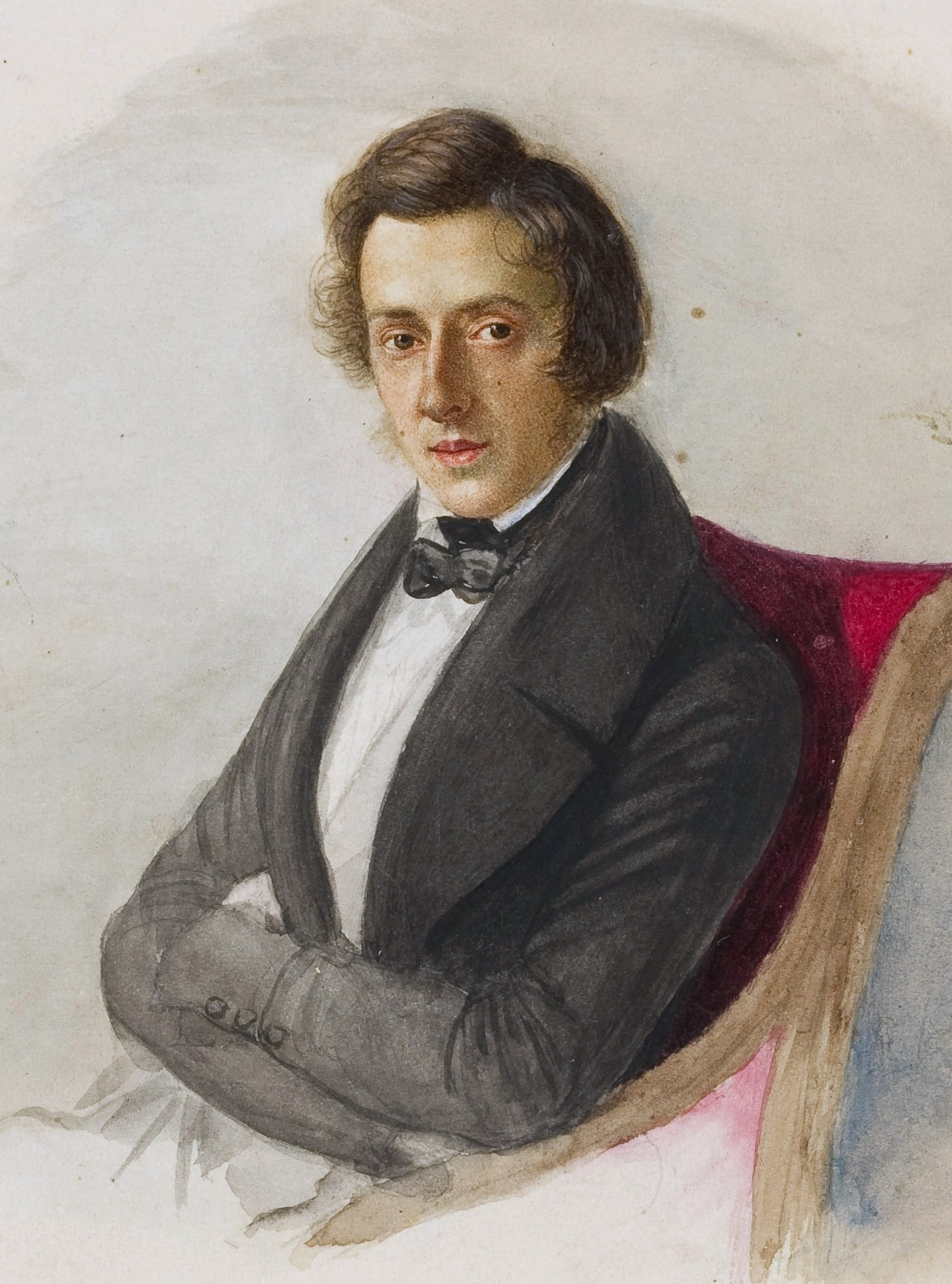
Chopin, 1835

Mazurkas, Op. 59 are a set of three Mazurkas for solo piano by Frédéric Chopin. The set was composed and published in 1845.

== Analysis ==
=== Mazurka in A minor, Op. 59, No. 1 ===
The mazurka in A minor, a highly chromatic mazurka, conveys melancholy with a warm portrait.

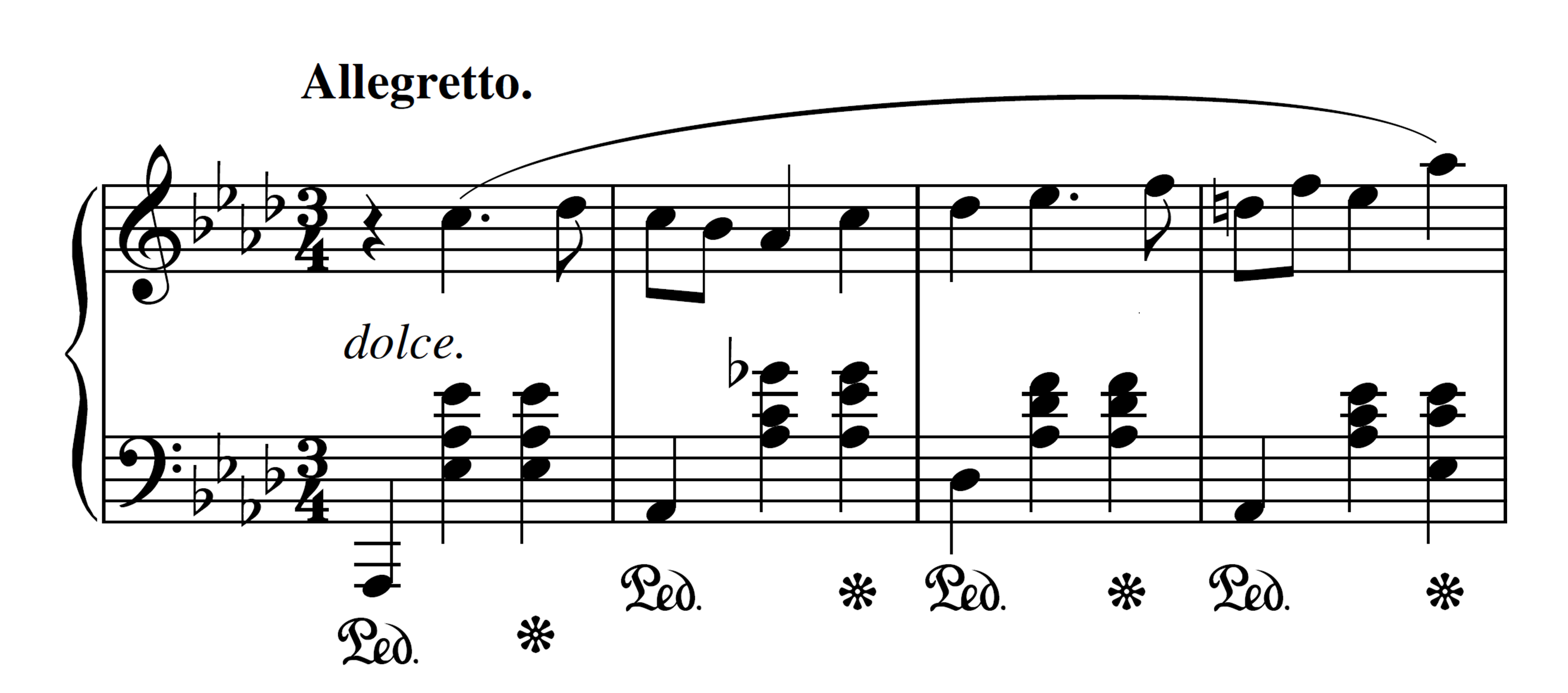
Mazurka in A♭ major, Op. 59, No. 2

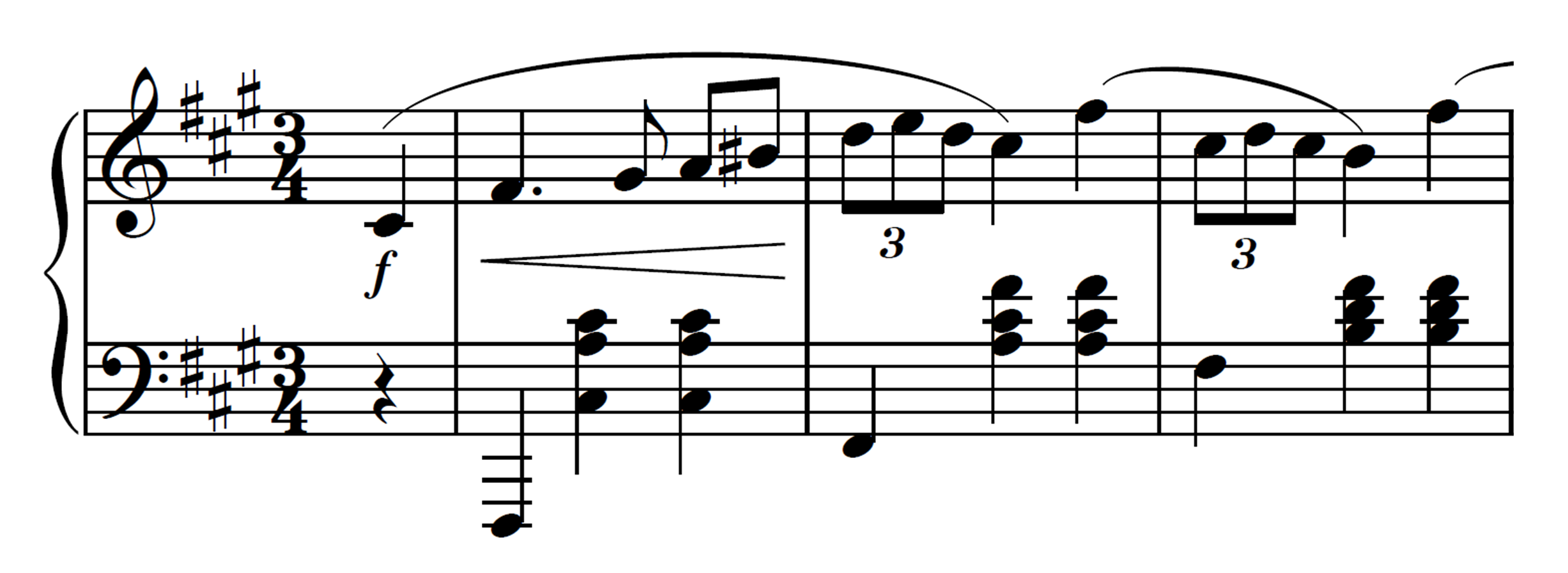
Mazurka in F♯ minor, Op. 59, No. 3

Mazurka in A minor, Op. 59 No. 1

Mazurka in A♭ major, Op. 59 No. 2

Mazurka in F♯ minor, Op. 59 No. 3
Performed by Xuan He

=== Mazurka in A♭ major, Op. 59, No. 2 ===
The mazurka in A♭ major is the second and shortest of the Op. 59 mazurkas, with a typical performance lasting around 2 and a half minutes.

The piece begins with a striking theme coupled with a low bass. The trio section provides little contrast to the main theme. The piece concludes with an elaborate coda full of accidentals, chromatic harmonies, and an ascending melody, before finishing on the tonic chord repeated 4 times.

=== Mazurka in F♯ minor, Op. 59, No. 3 ===
The final mazurka in F♯ minor is structured on an oberek, a national Polish dance characteristic for being the fastest mazurka form. The piece begins with a memorable and powerful melody. The second theme is somewhat more joyful than the first. The left hand accompaniment of the piece experiments with descending chromatic harmonies, while the melody remains defined throughout the piece.

An autograph manuscript housed at the Morgan Library & Museum in New York contains a complete draft of this Mazurka written in the key of G minor, dedicated to Ferdinand Hiller.
