= Ripe Banana Skins =

Ska punk band from Paraguay

- Origin: Asunción
- Genres: Ska punk Punk rock Hardcore punk Rock; Reggae
- Years active: 2001 - present
- Members: Andrés Selich; Rodrigo Cristaldo; Pablo G. Blaya; Marcelo Soler; Víctor Montanaro; Ricardo Velazquez
- Website: www.ripebananaskins.com

Ripe Banana Skins (also known as RBS) is a Ska punk band from Asunción, Paraguay. The band was formed in 2001 and are one of the most popular punk bands in Paraguay.

== History ==
The band was the result of the merge of two other bands: "Toilete Flush" and "Fugu". The band's first name was "Blackfly" but once they established their sound they changed the name to Ripe Banana Skins. The band recorded a few demos and quickly gained fans as a result of touring and being the opening act of the very popular Paraguayan rock band Flou. This allowed the band to tour extensively through Paraguay and also in Brazil and Argentina.

In November 2003 the band began recording their first self-titled album which quickly rose up the charts when released in 2005. RBS also participated in the popular Paraguayan rock festival "Quilmes Rock", playing in front of more than 40,000 people. In 2009, their music was amongst that compiled by Itaú Cultural for a project called Rumos Música, which gathered music from 5 Latin American countries in 8 double CDs, and played them in a web radio; they, along with harpist Kike Pedersen, were Paraguay's only representatives.

In 2021, the band was awarded a prize from the Argentine Film Critics Association for composing the soundtrack for the Argentine movie Las buenas intenciones.

== Discography ==
- Ripe Banana Skins (2005)
- Oido Antena (2012)
- Las buenas intenciones (2019)

=== Other works ===
The band has also contributed some songs in other albums such as "Pasalo y Que No Vuelva", a compilation of songs by South American Ska punk bands and "El Nuevo Vuelo del Rock", a compilation of Paraguayan rock bands.

== Members ==
- Andrés Selich - (Vocals)
- Rodrigo Cristaldo - (Vocals)
- Pablo G. Blaya - (Guitar)
- Marcelo Soler - (Drums)
- Victor "Pepu" Montanaro - (Guitar)
- Ricardo Velazquez - (Bass)

=== Former members ===
- Fernando Uriarte - (Drums)
