= Emigdio Ayala Báez =

Paraguayan musician (1917–1993)

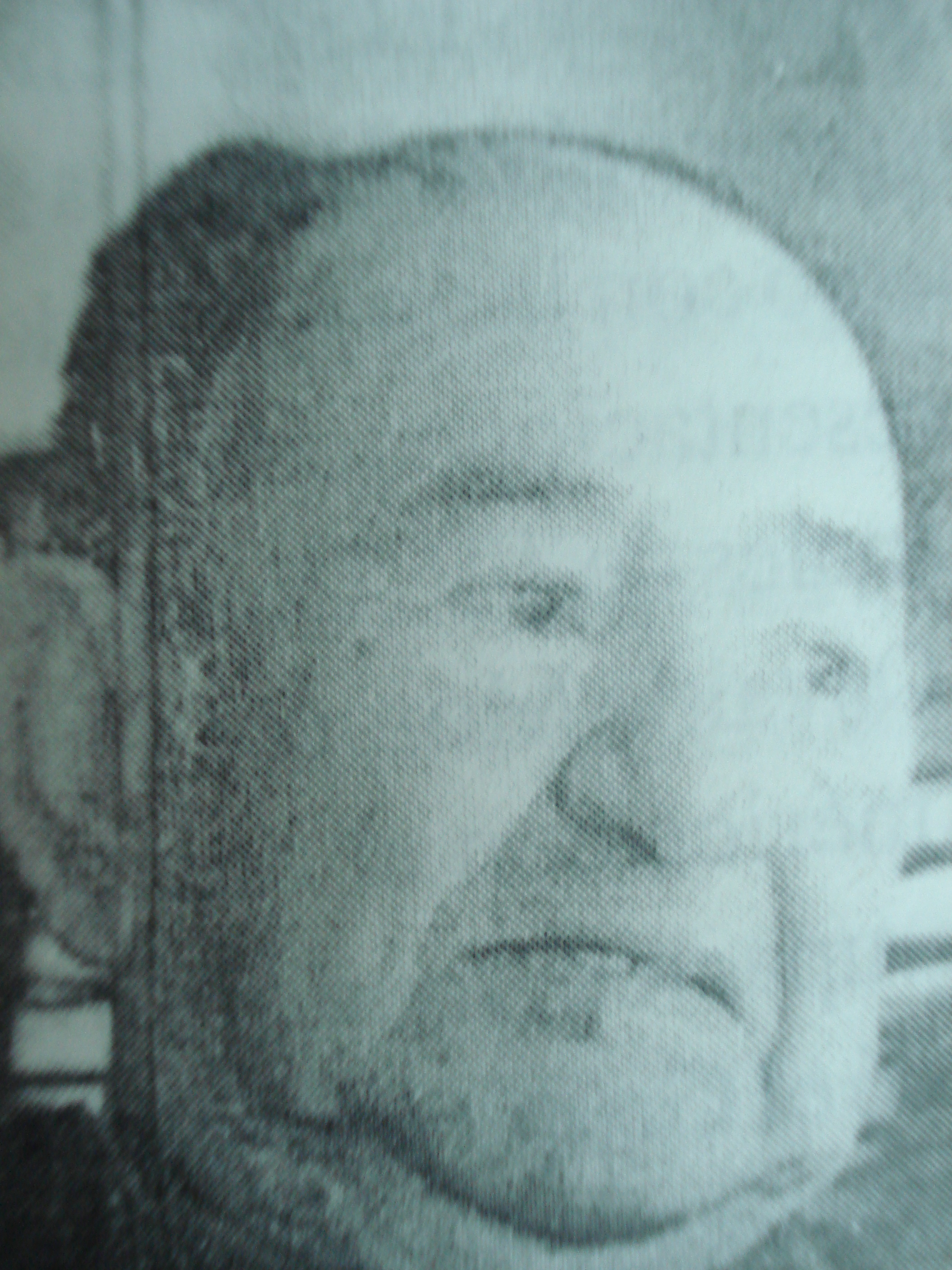
- Born: Emigdio Ayala Báez; August 5, 1917; Paraguarí, Paraguay
- Died: February 24, 1993 (aged 75); Paraguarí, Paraguay
- Known for: Musician
- Notable work: "A mi pueblito Escobar" "Sol de América"

Emigdio Ayala Báez (August 5, 1917 – February 24, 1993) was a Paraguayan musician. He was born in Escobar, a town of the Paraguarí Department, Paraguay.

== Beginnings ==
He started his artistic career with the master Herminio Giménez, with who, around 1940, started his first artistic tour of presentation in Brazil.

In 1941 the famous group of Félix Pérez Cardozo recorded his composition “Mi dicha lejana”, a beautiful guarania that became very popular.

In 1947 he went on tour for Argentina with Herminio Giménez.

== Career ==
In 1948 he was invited by Eladio Martínez to be part of the delegation of artists that would go to the Olympic Games in London, England, with the sponsor of Sir Eugen Millington-Drake, to compensate the absence of Paraguayan athletes. During this trip to Europe he wrote, with Martínez, the guarania “Oración a mi amada” (Pray to my beloved), one of the richest a most popular love songs in Paraguay. The “Trio Olímpico” (Olympic Trio), name for which they were known with (Albino Quiñonez completed the group) performed with great success in several shows in the BBC of London, sung for the sport and cultural delegations from several other countries in Oxford University and for the Royal Family too. They also traveled to other countries in Europe.

He lived for many decades in Buenos Aires, Argentina and returned to Paraguay in the late ‘80s. He was founder member of APA (Association of Paraguayan Authors) and member for life of the SADAIC (Sociedad Argentina de Autores y Compositores de Música).

== Last years ==
He died in his hometown Escobar, in Paraguarí Department, on February 24, 1993.

== Work ==
Besides the ones that were already mentioned he composed: “A mi pueblito Escobar” (For my town Escobar), “Sol de América” (Sun of América, polka), “Lejana Flor” (Distant flower), “Dulce polquita” (Sweet little polka), “Nde tapere”, “Noche en el corazón” (Night in the heart) and “Palomita ven”.
