= Luis Alberto del Paraná =

Background information
- Born: Luis Osmer Meza; Altos, Paraguay 21 June 1926
- Died: London, United Kingdom 15 September 1974 (aged 48)
- Occupations: Composer, singer-songwriter, musical artist, performer, writer
- Years active: 1942—1974

Luis Alberto del Paraná (21 June 1926 – 15 September 1974) was a Paraguayan singer and guitarist. During the fifties, sixties and early seventies, he traveled extensively around the globe with his group Los Paraguayos, popularizing Paraguayan music. He is the best-selling Paraguayan musician ever.

== Family and early life ==
He was born on 21 June 1926 at 14:30 in Altos, Paraguay. His birth was reported in the magistrates court on 14 August 1926 by his mother, Jacinta Mesa (not Meza). His name was Luis Osmer Meza.

Luis was the fourth son of eight children, of whom one was a girl, Obdulia (Chiquita), a retired singer. Doña Jacinta, Paraná's mother died on 15 August 1965, while Luis was in Stockholm touring in Europe; Luis's father, who was a rural teacher, died in Piripucú, Concepción in 1947.

Luis attended primary school in Ypacaraí. At the age of 14, Luis entered the boy-scouts in "Batallón Rojas Silva " (Salesianito), under Father Ernesto Pérez Acosta's management.

== Adult life and artistic career ==
"The fact that he was meant to be an artist was clear from the age of eighteen, when he interpreted 'Campo Grande' alongside Humberto Barúa and Digno García, a great harpist. It was there, in the old Rex theatre, that people started to feel attracted by this young, enthusiastic countryside boy."

After touring through Central America, Luis Alberto del Paraná (artistic name adopted in Mexico) formed a band with Digno García and Agustin Barboza. This band was named Trío Los Paraguayos and by decree, 24 November 1953, the national government gave each one of the members 3200 dollars to disseminate Paraguayan music in Europe through an "Official Cultural Mission".

His first wife was Lissette Cairoli, a French "circus princess". His second wife was Carmen González Caballero, a Spanish dancer. They had two children, Luis Manuel Meza González and Carmen Fabiola Meza González.

In 1958 in Milan, Paraná gave Father Pérez a complete set of percussion instruments for his former Scout Battalion to use. Later on, Paraná dedicated a song to Father Pérez. This song was included in an LP issued by Philips International and was distributed worldwide.

When the contract expired, the band dissolved and Paraná formed the band Los Paraguayos with his brother Reynaldo Meza, Rubito Medina, and José de los Santos González, a harpist. They quickly recorded two LP's for Philips in the Netherlands: "Famous Latin American Songs" and "Ambassador of Romance", which had great success. This was the start of the recording of "more than 500 songs". They recorded hit after hit until Paraná died.

They shared the stage with The Beatles and recorded with The Rolling Stones.

Luis Alberto del Paraná and "Los Paraguayos" played live at the Benny Hill show "Season 1 Episode 3" (1970)

Luis Alberto del Paraná and "Los Paraguayos" sold more than 30 000 000 records, more than 650 000 tape cassettes, and traveled more than 1 000 000 kilometers during their tours.

== Death and burial ==
He died on 15 September 1974, aged 48, in London, England. He was at the first floor of the Pembridge Court Hotel, in room eight when he suffered from a brain stroke.

His casket was transported to Asunción, where it was carried off the plane by many dignitaries, including the President. It was a huge event rarely seen by the nation. The people spontaneously packed the streets to say goodbye to their idol.

This event was named "The Chain of Pain" and almost all of the radio stations in Paraguay and many around the world tuned in to transmit every minute of the episode until his burial in "La Recoleta Cemetery", at the capital Asunción.

== Discography ==
- Paraguayan Song Nº 1
- Paraguayan Song Nº 2
- Bajo el Cielo del Paraguay
- Famous Latin American Songs
- South American Minstrels
- Trovador Tropical
- Trovador Tropical Nº 2
- Tropical Trip
- Ambassadors of Romance
- Historia de un Amor
- Buenas noches mi amor
- En escena
- Para mí, Para tí, Paraná
- Sentimentally yours
- Canciones de las Américas
- La Burrerita de Ypacarai
- În România I
- În România II
- În România III
- În România IV
- În România V
- Mi Guitarra y mi Voz
- Felicidades
- Amici, Amici
- All Star Festival - UNICEF
- Acuarela Paraguaya
- Por todo el mundo...
- Paraguayos in Tokio
- Popular Favourites
- Music Minstrels Please
- San Remo 1966
- Fiesta Asuncena
- En Buenos Aires
- Con los Violines de Lima
- World Hits
- Live in Concert
- Siempre el mejor
- Espléndido
- In London
- Papillón
- Epopeya Nacional
- Éxtasis Tropìcal
- Latin American Dance Party
- Live in Concert... Berlín
- Canciones Tropicales
- Adiós Mariquita Linda
- Quizás, quizás, quizás

== In popular culture ==
His recordings "Hace un Año" and "Malagueña" were used in the film Born on the Fourth of July (1989).
Paraná Awards are the most prominent awards for Paraguayan radio and television.
