= Music of Paraguay =

The music of Paraguay includes a variety of traditional, popular, and classical musical styles. The most famous forms of traditional music include Paraguayan polka and Guarania. The Paraguayan polka developed from the polka of Czech origin, while the guarania was created by the Paraguayan musician José Asunción Flores in the 1920s. The guitar and the Paraguayan harp are prominent instruments in the country's musical traditions. Popular music in Paraguay includes genres such as rock and jazz. The country's classical music tradition includes composers who have combined European musical techniques with Paraguayan and Indigenous musical influences.

== Overview ==
The polka presents numerous variations on a similar rhythmic pattern, which are known as: Polka song, Galopa, Polka valseada, Polka popó, Polka jekutu, Polka kyre'y, Polka syryry, Purahéi jahe'o, Kyre'y, Chamamé, among other. Another rhythm it created by the fusion of rhythms is called "Avanzada", which in 1977 was elaborated by the Paraguayan musician Oscar Nelson Safuán.

The modern rhythms reached Paraguay in the 1950s, with the importation of electronic instruments that began to use dance orchestras. Mainly in the 1970s, latin music, rock music, pop, dance, protest song, cumbia (cachaca), among others, were developed. Currently there is also a growing scene of latin music, folklore, hiphop, blues music, jazz, rock, electronic music, ethnic, reggae, and other genres.

The Paraguayan polka combines ternary and binary rhythms, where as the European only uses binary. The most famous style of music is Guarania, created by the Paraguayan musician José Asunción Flores in 1926. The Guarania accomplishes this by using a combination of slow rhythms and melodies of melancholia character. Other popular genres of traditional music in Paraguay are the zarzuela and the "Paraguayan Songs", which are derived from the Paraguayan polka. Examples of Paraguayan Guarania are Juan B. Mora – Imposible, Duo Ñamandu – Che Rope'a Vype, Lorenzo Perez – Mi Dicha Lejana, Los Indianos – Mis Noches Sin Ti and others. The greatest influence outside Paraguay was Luís Alberto del Paraná y su Trío Los Paraguayos. There was a time in the 1950s when most of the LP's of Latin American music in the shops in London were by that group. The guaranía mentioned above is a slow-to-medium style. The more lively music is called "polka paraguaya". Both styles are based on the 6/8 rhythm. Paraguayan songs tend to be sung in Guaraní or a mixture of Guaraní and Spanish. Music of a strongly Paraguayan character is also heard in the Argentine provinces of Misiones, Formosa and Corrientes, across the River Paraná from Paraguay itself. Drag artist Usha Didi Gunatita used popular music in her early performances at bars such as Stop, Trauma or Playboy.

=== Instruments ===
The Spanish guitar (not from Paraguay) and European harp are among the most popular instruments, while dances include the lively polka and distinctive bottle dance, which involves the performer twirling a bottle around her head. Composer and guitarist Agustín Barrios is perhaps the country's best known export.

=== Paraguayan harp ===
The Paraguayan harp deserves special mention as a popular instrument with a national style associated with it. The harp in South America dates back to at least 1556–1557, possibly as early as the beginning of the 16th century. It was introduced to Paraguay by Jesuit priests who came to evangelise (the native population of indigenous Guaranis) and founded many missions, called "reducciones" . It was frequently used in church music in place of the organ or harpsichord. The Paraguayan harp is the national instrument of Paraguay, its shape and size were consolidated in the early 20th century by interpreter and composer Felix Perez Cardozo, who composed some of the most memorable pieces for the Paraguayan harp. It stands about 1.5 metres (5 ft) high and is light and portable. The sound box is made of cedro (a type of mahogany) and pine. However, more recently, harps have begun to be constructed with the addition of levers to overcome this limitation, and many players are now using levered harps.

== Popular music ==
=== Rock ===
Rock is a popular genre in the Paraguayan music scene. Former President Alfredo Stroessner established a dictatorship and oppressed freedom of expression during his term between 1954 and 1989. But rock band Aftermad's and Los Blue Caps were formed during this time from late 1960s to 1970s. The end of the dictatorship of Stroessner in 1989, a new rock scene started. New rock bands such as Flou (alt rock), Revolver (alt rock), Ripe Banana Skins (punk), Area 69, Paiko, The Force (slash metal) were formed. 21st century Paraguayan rock scene is supported by rock festivals such as "Pilsen Rock" and "Quilmes Rock". The dance trio LPZ was successful with house music.

=== Jazz ===
There is a small but vibrant jazz community in Paraguay. Jazz Day festival was opened in Paraguay. Key players and group include: CCPA Jazz Quintet, Palito Miranda (alto sax), Remigio Pereira (trombone), Victor "Toti" Morel (drums), Oswal Gonzalez (drums), Riolo Alvarenga (drums), Jorge "Lobito" Martinez (piano), Carlos Schvartzman (guitar), Carlos Centurión (piano), Gustavo Viera (guitar), Eduardo "Tato" Zilli (bass), Nene Salerno (bass), Ariel Burgos (bass), Victor Morel Jr. (drums), German Lema (organ), Jose Villamayor (guitar), Bruno Muñoz (tenor and alto saxophone) and others.

== Classical music ==
The main exponents are Agustín Barrios Mangoré, José Asunción Flores, Berta Rojas and Juan Carlos Moreno. Silva studied abroad and reproduced, in the Guarani vocal form, the indigenous music, based on the European technique. Moreno composed works inspired on popular themes in a romantic classical path.
