= Juan París =

Cuban priest and composer

Juan París (Barcelona, 1759 – Santiago de Cuba, 10 July 1845) was a priest and composer in Spanish Cuba.

He followed Esteban Salas y Castro in the Cathedral of Santiago de Cuba. His election as Maestro de Capilla (choirmaster), after the death of Salas in 1803, was an extraordinary event. It had been a foregone conclusion that Francisco José Hierrezuelo, long-time assistant of Salas, would be elected. Came the day, and Hierrezuelo spotted a well-qualified German priest in the choir. Blind with rage, and fearing the bishop had planned a conspiracy to thwart him, Hierrezuelo refused to take the examination, picked up his pen and wrote infuriated letters. The bishop persuaded the German, Juan Nepomucino Goetz, to renounce his candidacy, but Hierrezuelo had so offended the bishop and the town council by his irate letters that, despite grovelling apologies, he got only a minor position in the chapel. He was never to become maestro. Goetz moved on to Havana, where his arrival also had remarkable consequences.

So Juan París took the exam, and was appointed as choirmaster. París was an exceptionally industrious man, and an important composer. Under his hand, the church became a library, an academy, a concert hall and a rehearsal space. It encouraged continuous and diverse musical events.
