= 1845 in philosophy =

1845 in philosophy

== Publications ==
- Alexander von Humboldt, Cosmos: A Sketch of the Physical Description of the Universe (1845)
- William Whewell, The Elements Of Morality, Including Polity (1845)
- Domingo Faustino Sarmiento, Facundo (1845)
- Søren Kierkegaard, Stages on Life's Way (1845)

== Births ==
- March 3 - Georg Cantor (died 1918)

== Deaths ==
- May 12 - August Wilhelm Schlegel (born 1767)
- February 22 - Sydney Smith (born 1771)
