= Mauricio Cardozo Ocampo =

Paraguayan musician (1907–1982)

- Born: Mauricio Cardozo Ocampo; May 14, 1907; Ybycuí, Paraguay
- Died: May 5, 1982 (aged 74) Buenos Aires, Argentina
- Genre: Paraguayan folk music
- Occupations: Singer, songwriter

Mauricio Cardozo Ocampo (May 14, 1907 – May 5, 1982) was a Paraguayan composer and singer. He was the main reference of the so-called "golden generation" of the Paraguayan popular music and a strict studious of the Paraguayan folk music.

== Biography ==
Mauricio Cardozo Ocampo was born in Ybycuí on May 14, 1907, son of Crescencia Cardozo Caballero. He started his music education with the flute player Eloy Martín Pérez, in his home town. He continued his studies with Juan J. Rojas and the first instruments that he played were the flute and the guitar.

In Asunción, he joined the Police Band of the Capital, working under the direction of the masters Nicolino Pellegrini and Salvador Dentice.

He made artistic tours around countries and cities of the region, finally stopping in Buenos Aires, Argentina, where he settled to live and continue his studies with the greatest masters of harmony and compositions and instrumentation, Isidro Maistegui and Gilardo Gilardi. With the Argentinian folk specialist Juan Alfonso Carrizo he began his studies of folk science.

During the time of his military instruction he met Eladio Martínez, who he played with a duet "Martínez-Cardozo", which recorded an important quantity of discs for Odeon studios of Buenos Aires where he also performed many presentations at theatres, radios and cultural centers. In 1932, due to the beginning of the Chaco War between Paraguay and Bolivia, the duet "Martínez-Cardozo", together with other artists, made successful acting to gather money for the Paraguayan Red Cross.

At the end of the war, in Buenos Aires, the Paraguayan Circle is founded, and the "Martínez-Cardozo" are active members, and little by little Cardozo Ocampo begins "Ñandé Rogá", an important music work which later will end up being the foundation of "Guaraní Folk Group" and then "Folk Club Rincon Guaraní".

He wrote and directed radio cycles about Paraguayan music and culture by the Radio Argentina of Buenos Aires (between 1948 and 1952). He was the creator of "Banda Ocara" (1954–1957) in Asunción. He organized several Paraguayan music concert cycles leading the Orquesta Estable of L.R.1, Radio Splendid, in the Argentinian capital, for two seasons (1961–1962). He was Folk teacher of the Institute of Fine Arts Romaro, Buenos Aires, between 1959 and 1965.

He was one of the founders of the Argentinian Society of Authors and Composers, having been a member of the Authors and Composers Circle, and from the fusion of both, SADAIC appeared in 1936. This group named him as a delegate before the President of the Paraguayan Republic to deal with the issuing of a protectionist law of intellectual property; the Decree-law number 94 was a result of this, inscribed by President Federico Chávez.

=== Positions in favor of art ===
Among his many activities in the musical work, the Folk science and the union work in favor of musicians, we can also mention his work as a secretary of APA (Paraguayan Authors Association) member of the Paraguayan Musicians Association, member of the Guaraní Language and Culture Academy, member of the Paraguayan Indian Association, chief of the Folk department of the Paraguayan General Tourism Direction, folk advisor for the Town Hall of Asunción, honor president of APROFON (Paraguayan Association Phonograms Producers), folk advisor of IFAP (Paraguayan Folk players Association).

=== Cultural support ===
As a lecturer, his work was great, presenting many scientific gatherings of the folk specialty, festivals, congress, seminars and symposiums in more than twenty cities of Argentina and Uruguay. Since 1961 he gave speeches and conferences on subjects such as "La música paraguaya y sus ramificaciones", "El arpa paraguaya", "Nombres genéricos de la música paraguaya", "La fiesta de la galopa", "El origen de la música paraguaya", "Músicas y danzas paraguayas", "La música paraguaya y su influencia en el Río de la Plata", "Música y danza paraguaya y la voz espúrea de litoraleña", "Leyendas y costumbres del Paraguay", "6x8, signo musical de América Latina", "Folklore paraguayo", "¿Qué es folklore?", "El tirteo verde-olivo: Emiliano R. Fernández", "Instrumentos musicales del Paraguay", "Músicos, poetas y artífices de la cultura artística paraguaya", among others .

When he came back to Paraguay he formed the "Conjunto Folklórico Perú Rimá", whose work in the Paraguayan music hierarchy, which is greatly recognized by the quality and artistic rigor as well as its aesthetics .

=== Artistic style ===
He dedicated himself specially to the music composition of folk inspiration on Paraguayan rhythms. His work, of great value, stands out for its understanding of the popular feeling of the country man, as well as for the sensitivity of the melodic and harmonic treatment, which for the Master, according to his own saying, was "a matter of musical honour".

=== Family and late life ===
He was married to Fidelina Fleitas (Doña Fide), all of his children followed his passion for music: Oscar, director and orchestra fixing, well known pianist and composer was internationally recognized by his work in the Argentinian capital; Aníbal, a music critic and Mauricio(h) (Pinchi), noted guitarist, composer and fixer and Sonia Amambay, singer.

He died in Buenos Aires, Argentina, on May 5, 1982.

== Works ==
=== Music ===
Among his more than 300 compositions, we can name "Galopera" (it has the merit of being among the three most widely spread plays of the Paraguayan music history).

- "Pueblo Ybycui",
- "Las siete cabrillas",
- "Añoranza",
- "Mi destino",
- "Paraguaya linda",
- "Guavirá poty",
- "Che morenamí",
- "Regalo de amor",
- "Ondina del Plata",
- "Canto a Itacurubí",
- "Morena",
- "Rincón guaraní",
- "Se que te perdí",
- "Amambay",
- "Estrellita",
- "Que linda es mi bandera",
- "La carreta campesina",
- "San Baltasar",
- "Cambá la mercé",
- "Chokokué kera yvoty",
- "Noches blancas",
- "Luna de mi Asunción",
- "Marizza",
- "Punta porá",
- "Mombyry guive",
- "Chokokue purahei",
- "Yo soy purahei",
- "Josefina",
- "Mansú resay",
- "Mi amor guaraní",
- "Corazón",
- "Arroyito del sendero",
- "Volverás a soñar",
- "Solita estoy",
- "Soledad",
- "Mi retorno" y
- "En una noche azul", just to mention the most representative ones.

=== Books ===
- Mis bodas de ORO con el folklore-Memorias de un pychaí
- Mundo Folklórico paraguayo
