= Herminio Giménez =

Paraguayan composer

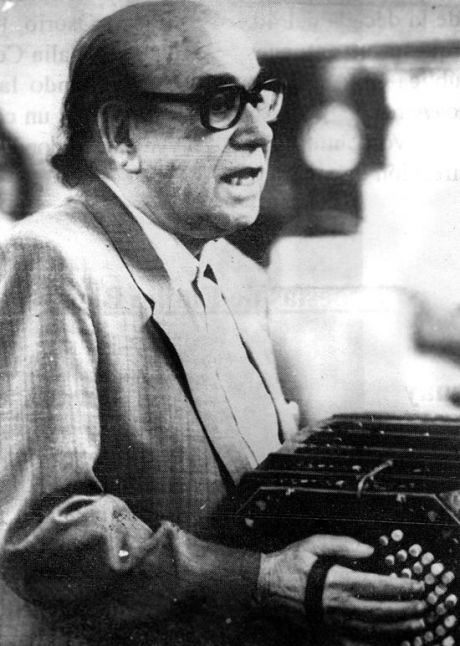

Herminio Giménez (February 20, 1905 – July 6, 1991) was a Paraguayan composer.

== Life ==
At the early age of 11 he was already part of the Paraguarí music band and two years later he was hired to be part of the Asunción marching band. While at the marching band he made his first successful song, a polca named Jasy Morotí, in 1918. He was the first person to record Paraguayan music in an album, in 1927. The continued beauty of his works throughout the years positioned Giménez as one of the greatest Latin American composers.

During the Chaco War he was assigned as the Director of the Military band and once the war was over he received several awards. Due to the dictatorship of Alfredo Stroessner's government, Giménez went into exile in Argentina. He spent most of his time in the city of Corrientes. After Stroessner was ousted, he returned to Paraguay and died in 1991.

== Works ==
Giménez compositions ranged from Paraguayan polkas and Guaranias to waltzes and marching songs. His most famous works include: Añorando a Matto Grosso, Al Papa Wojtyla, Ruperto Bravo, Feliz Cuarto Centenario, Corrientes, Sapukái en las Malvinas, Corasô rasy, Corasô rasy, Panchita Garmendia, Ha che tren, Che valle Pirajumi and Campesina Paraguaya.
