= Digno García =

Paraguayan harpist

Digno García (Luque, 1919 - Geraardsbergen, 4 February 1984) was a Paraguayan harpist. Garcia formed his own group Sus Carios with Lonardo Aquino, Antonia Alvarez and Arnaldo Peralta.

== Discography ==
Albums

- "Digno Garcia Y Su Trio Del Paraguay" (Montilla Records, 1956)
- Vivo Digno Garcia 1960

Singles

- A: Morena B: Moliendo Cafe Digno Garcia Y Sus Carios Palette Netherlands 1961 7"
- I Love Paraguay EP Digno Garcia Y Sus Carios A1: Paloma Blanca A2: Ycua Caaguy B1: Isabelita B2: Mi Bandera 1962
