= Emiliano R. Fernández =

Paraguayan poet (1894–1949)

Emiliano Fernández Rivarola
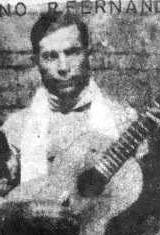

Background information
- Also known as: Emiliano R. Fernández
- Born: Emiliano Rivarola Fernández; August 8, 1894; Yvysunu, Guarambaré, Paraguay
- Died: September 15, 1949 (aged 55) Asunción, Paraguay
- Occupations: Poet, musician and soldier

Emiliano Fernández (August 8, 1894 – September 15, 1949) was a Paraguayan poet and musician who was a soldier in the Chaco War.
