= José Asunción Flores =

Paraguayan composer (1904–1972)

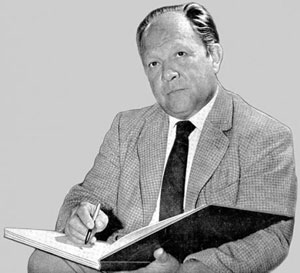
Image of Jose Asuncion Flores

José Asunción Flores (27 August 1904 – 16 May 1972) was a Paraguayan composer and creator of the Guarania music genre.

== Early life ==
Flores was born in the poor neighborhood of La Chacarita, in Asunción. As a kid, he had to work as a paperboy and shoeshiner in order to help his mother with food and other necessities. At the early age of 11 he had already joined the Capital Police marching band and was a student of composer Félix Fernández and director Salvador Déntice. In 1922, he made his first composition, a polka song named "Manuel Gondra".

== The birth of the Guarania ==
In 1925, after experimenting with different arrangements of the old Paraguayan song Maerãpa Reikuaase he managed to create a new genre, which he called Guarania. His first Guarania song was Jejui. The purpose of this new genre was to express the feelings of the Paraguayan people through music. Later Flores would comment on his creation as:

The Guarania is from my people, written for and by my people.

In 1928 he met the Guairá-native poet Manuel Ortiz Guerrero, and soon after the two started working together to create the most beautiful Guaranias songs to date such as India, Cerro Corá and Panambí Verá.

In 1932 he enrolled in the army to fight for Paraguay in the Chaco War. After the war, political instability ruled in Paraguay and Flores moved to Buenos Aires. While he was living in Argentina his songs were diffused throughout Paraguay and the Guarania genre became a success, confirming the originality and creativity of Flores' work. In 1944 the song India was declared by the Paraguayan government as a "national song". While living in Buenos Aires, Flores also worked on classical music and wrote twelve symphonies in his lifetime.

== Exile, death and legacy ==
Because of his work and contributions to Paraguayan music and culture, Flores was awarded the National Order of Merit in 1949. However, he decided not to accept the award to protest the killing of a student that occurred in a protest against the government. Because of that, he was considered "a traitor" by the government. When Alfredo Stroessner became the president of Paraguay in 1954, Flores was forbidden to return to Paraguay.

His wish to return to his home country was even denied in the latter years of his life when he was ill and wanted to see his homeland and people one more time before his death. Even though the government banned his songs, they were still being played by radio stations and the people, who had already identified with the Guaranias. Flores died in 1972, in Buenos Aires.

In 1991, after Stroessner was ousted, Flores' remains were brought back to Paraguay, and they rest in a plaza that has his name.

== List of works ==
José Asunción Flores' songs include:

- "India"
- "Nde Rendape ajú"
- "Panambí Verá"
- "Paraguaýpe"
- "Buenos Aires, Salud"
- "Kerasy"
- "Nde Raty Py Kuá"
- "Obrerito"
- "Gallito Cantor"
- "Purahéi Paha"
- "Mburicao"
- "Ñasaindype"
- "Ñande Aramboha"
- "Cholí"
- "Musiqueada Che Amape"
- "Ka´aty"
- "Arribeño Resay"

His symphonies include:

- Pyhare pyte
- Ñande Ru Vusu
- María de la Paz
