= Guarania (music) =

Musical genre originating in Paraguay

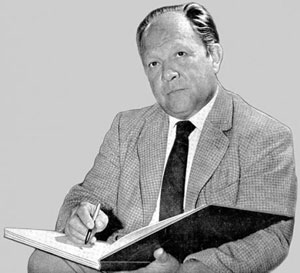
José Asunción Flores

Guarania is a genre of music created in Paraguay by musician José Asunción Flores in 1925, with the purpose of expressing the character of the Paraguayan people. This is accomplished by the slow and melancholic rhythms and melodies used in the songs.

Since its creation, the Guarania became the biggest musical phenomenon of Paraguay in the 20th century thanks to songs such as Jejuí (the first guarania), Kerasy, India and Arribeño Resay, which generated an immediate acceptance. The best known Guarania songs are Recuerdos de Ypakaraí, Ne rendápe aju, Mis noches sin ti, Panambí Vera, and Paraguaýpe.

The Guarania is highly regarded in the urban areas, but not in the countryside. This is because the people in the countryside prefer faster styles of songs, such as the paraguayan polka, which is danced more.

== See also ==
- Music of Paraguay
