= Red Cross Medal (Prussia) =

Red Cross Medal Rote Kreuz-Medaille
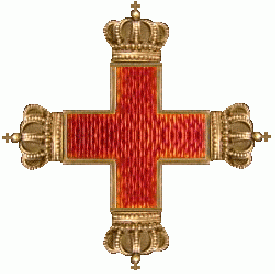
- Prussian Red Cross Medal, 1st Class
- Type: Civil decoration
- Awarded for: Service to the sick in war or peace. For special achievement in the service of the German Red Cross.
- Presented by: Prussia
- Status: No longer awarded
- Established: 1 October 1898
- Final award: 1921
- Ribbon of the medal

Order of Wear 1916
- Next (higher): Peacetime awards of the Orders of Hohenzollern, Red Eagle, and Crown (Second Class); Princely Order of Hohenzollern Honor Cross, 2nd & 3rd Class (Third Class)
- Next (lower): Orders of German States subordinate to Prussia for officers wearing another state’s cockade (Second Class); 1864 Düppel Cross (Third Class)

The Red Cross Medal was a German medal set up on 1 October 1898 by Wilhelm II. It had three classes and could be awarded to all those who carried out great service to the sick in peace or wartime, or for special achievement in the service of the German Red Cross. Though service to the sick during times of war had been recognized with prior awards of the Order of the Crown and General Honor Decorations with the Red Geneva Cross, Empress Augusta Victoria the royal patroness of the organization wanted an award to recognize work in peacetime as well.

The Red Cross Medal was awarded in three classes, the Second and Third classes being worn as circular medals suspended from a red ribbon with white and black stripes. The First Class was a red enameled Geneva Cross with gilded Prussian Royal Crowns at the ends of the arms. This award was worn as a steckreuz on the breast, like the Iron Cross. Recipients could be promoted to the next class of the medal with five years time in service, with the first level anyone could be initially appointed to being the Second Class.

== Appearance ==
=== First Class ===
The Red Cross Medal, First Class was a Steckkreuz in the form of the red enameled Geneva cross in gilded silver. At the ends of the cross arms are gilded Prussian Royal Crowns. The red enamel bears a hatch pattern. The back is plain gilded silver except for the single vertical attachment pin on the back. The cross is 46.6 to 48.8 mm high and weighs 14 gm.

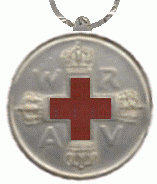
Red Cross Medal, 2nd Class

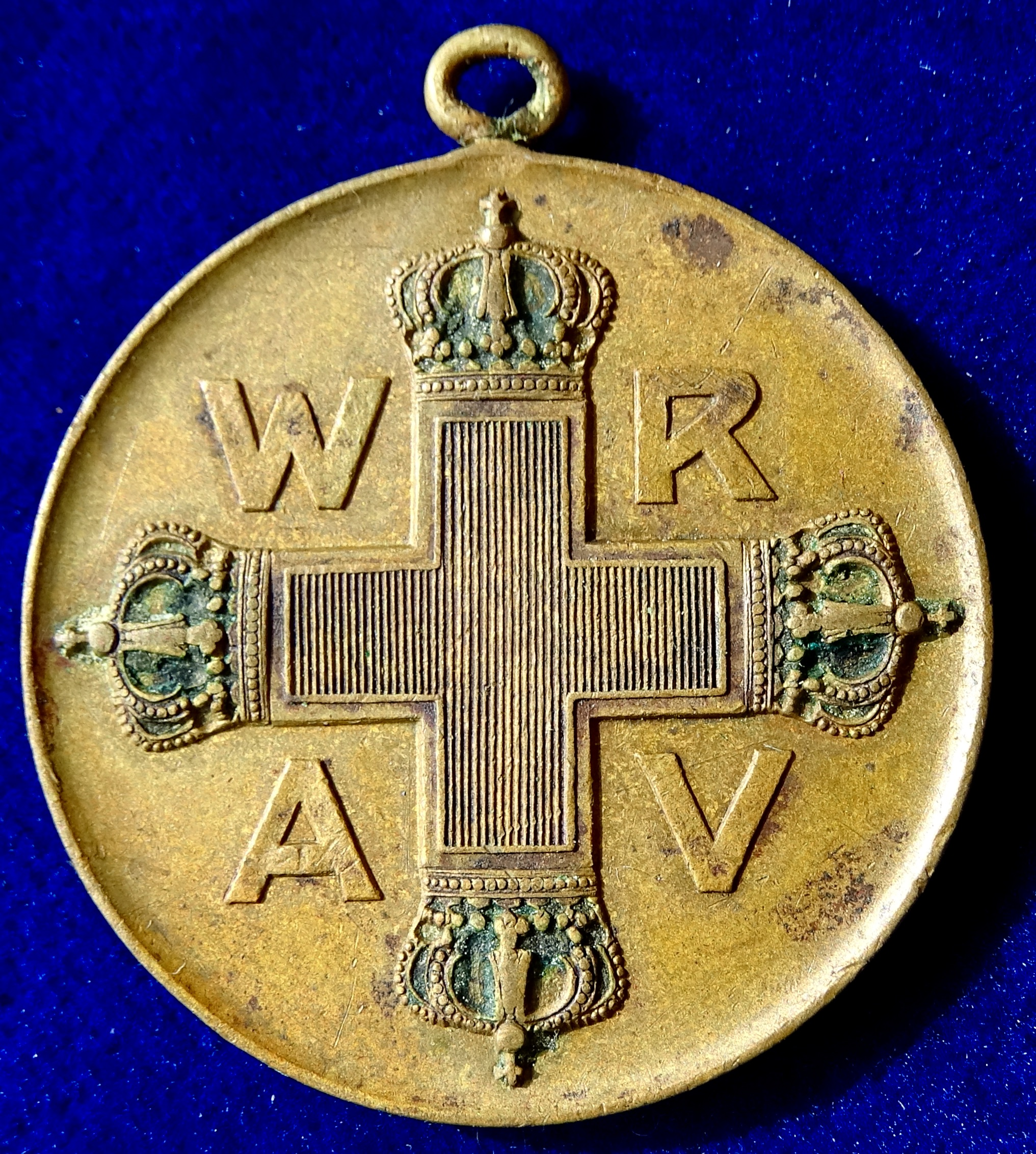
Red Cross Medal of 1898, Third Class in Bronze, obverse

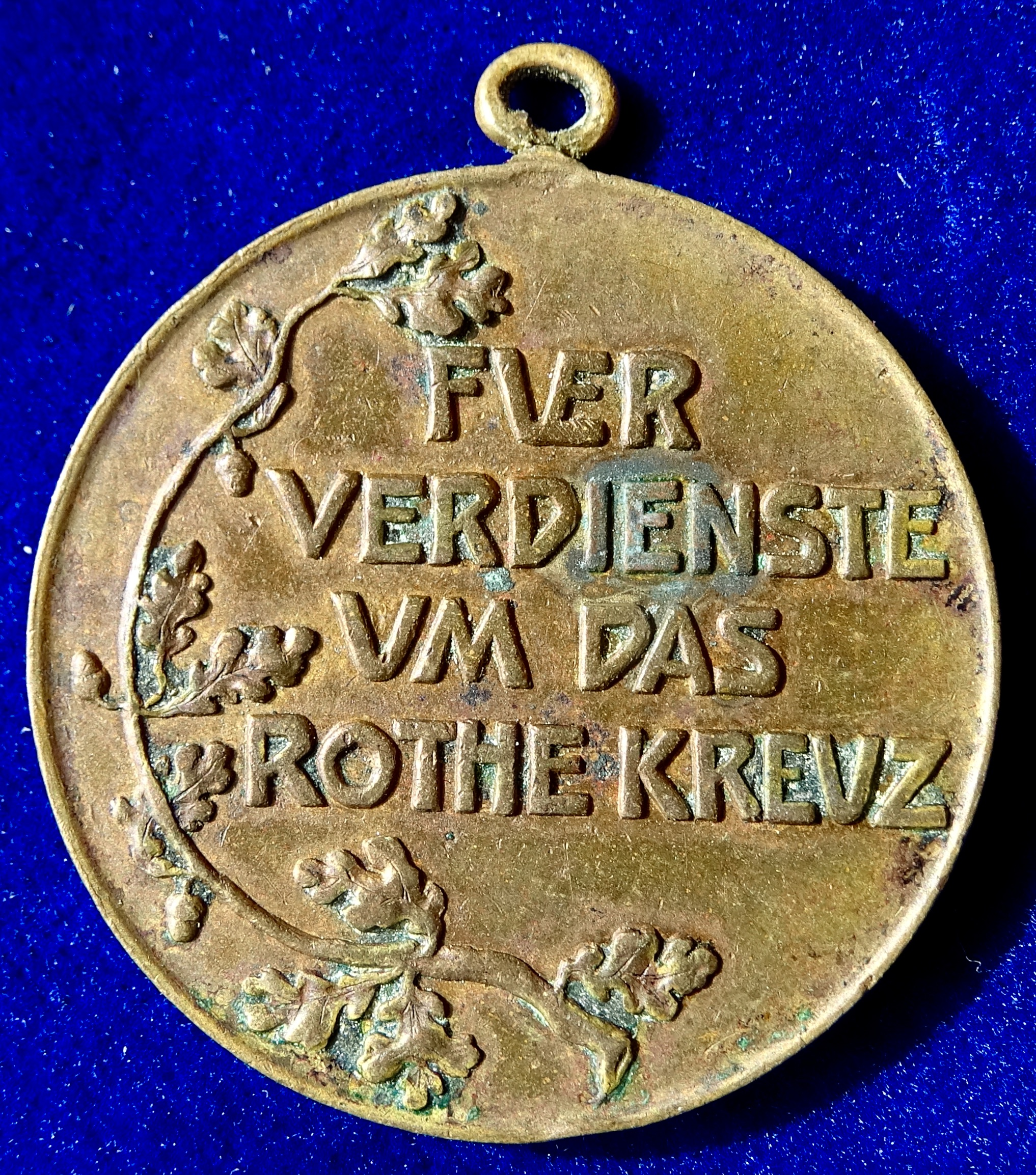
Red Cross Medal, Third Class in Bronze, reverse

=== Second Class ===
The Red Cross Medal, Second Class is a round, silver medal, 33 mm in diameter. On the obverse is a Geneva cross with Prussian royal crowns at the ends, of the arms of the cross. The Geneva cross is enabled in red. Between the arms of the cross are the initials W and R at the top (William Rex) and below are the initials A and V (Augusta Victoria). On the reverse is the inscription in four lines FUER / VERDIENSTE / UM DAS / ROTHE KREUZ (For Merit in the Red Cross). To the left of the inscription is a curved oak branch.

=== Third Class ===
The Red Cross Medal, Third Class, is a round bronze medal, 33 mm in diameter. The design is identical to the silver medal, except it lacks the red enameling of the cross on the obverse.

=== Clasps ===
In 1900, clasps for the medals were created to recognize service in war. Three were awarded:

- Südafrika 1899–1900 (South Africa 1899–1900)
- Ostasien 1900/01 (East Asia 1900/01)
- Südwestafrika 1904/06 (South-west Africa 1904/06)

== Recipients ==
- Lorenz Böhler
- Viriato Díaz Pérez
- Arnold Durig
- Friedrich von Georgi
- Prince Leopold of Bavaria
- Hermann Reinecke
- Jakob Weis

== See also ==
- German Red Cross Decoration
- Blood Donation Badge of Honor
- Red Cross Medal (Oldenburg)
