= Order of Merit of the Federal Republic of Germany =

Federal decoration of Germany

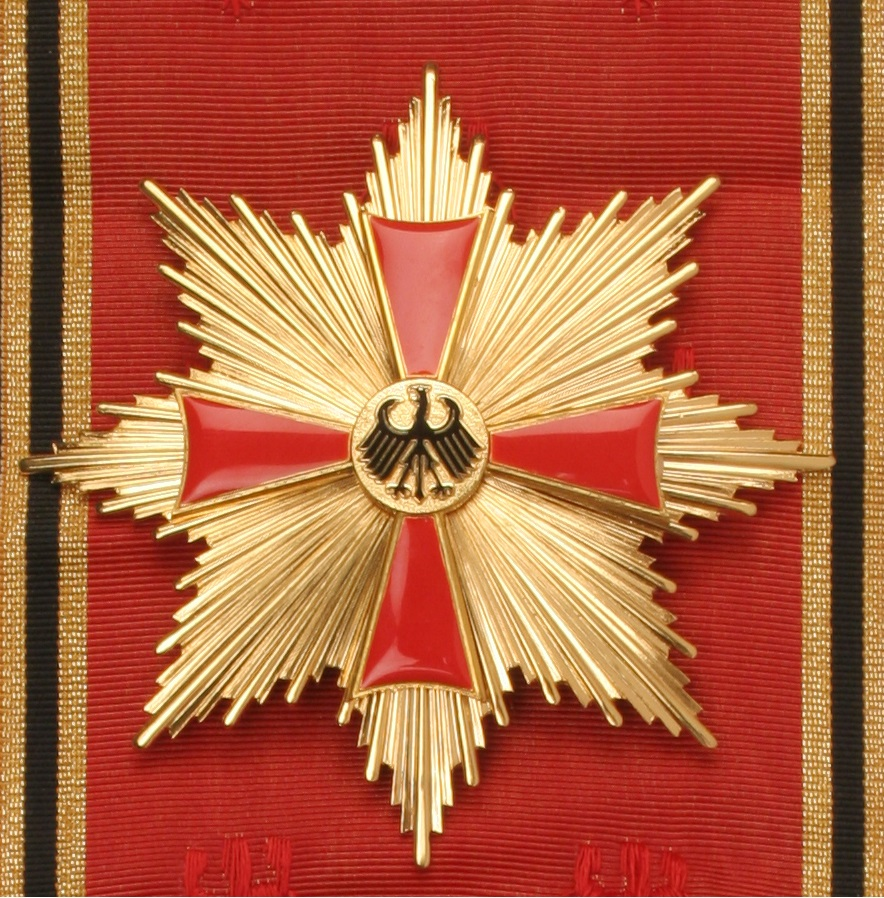
- Special Class of the Grand Cross (reserved for heads of state)
- Type: Order of merit with one special and eight regular classes
- Country: Federal Republic of Germany
- Presented by: the President of Germany
- Eligibility: Civilian and military personnel
- Established: 7 September 1951

Highlights
- Total: 262,532 (as of 31 December 2022)
- Website: bundespraesident.de
- Grand Cross Special Class Grand Cross 1st Class, Special Issue Grand Cross 1st Class Grand Cross Knight Commander Commander Officer Member Medal Ribbon bars of the Order of Merit

The Order of Merit of the Federal Republic of Germany (German: Verdienstorden der Bundesrepublik Deutschland, or Bundesverdienstorden, BVO) is the highest federal decoration of the Federal Republic of Germany. It may be awarded for any field of endeavor. It was created by the first President of the Federal Republic of Germany, Theodor Heuss, on 7 September 1951. Colloquially, the decorations of the different classes of the Order are also known as the Federal Cross of Merit (Bundesverdienstkreuz).

It has been awarded to more than 262,000 individuals in total, both Germans and foreigners. Since the 1990s, the number of annual awards has declined from more than 4,000, first to around 2,500, then from 2015 to under 1,500, with a low of 918 awards in 2022. Since 2013, women have made up a steady 30–35% of recipients.

Most of the German federal states (Länder) have each their own order of merit as well, with the exception of the Free and Hanseatic Cities of Bremen and Hamburg, which reject any orders (by tradition their citizens, particularly former or present senators, will refuse any decoration in the form of an order, the most famous example being former Chancellor Helmut Schmidt).

== History ==
The order was established on 7 September 1951 by the decree of Federal President Theodor Heuss. Signed by Heuss, German Chancellor Konrad Adenauer, and Minister of the Interior Robert Lehr, the decree states:

Desiring to visibly express recognition and gratitude to deserving men and women of the German people and of foreign countries, on the second anniversary of the Federal Republic of Germany, I establish the Order of Merit of the Federal Republic of Germany. It is awarded for achievements that served the rebuilding of the country in the fields of political, socio-economic, and intellectual activity, and is intended to be an award for all those whose work contributes to the peaceful rise of the Federal Republic of Germany.

In 2022 Federal President Frank-Walter Steinmeier introduced a gender quota which demands a minimum of 40% of nominees to the order to be women.

== Classes ==
The Order comprises four groups with eight regular classes and one special (medal) class (hereafter enumerated in English):

- Grand Cross (German: Großkreuz)
  - Grand Cross special class of the Order of Merit (Sonderstufe des Großkreuzes, Special Class of Grand Cross), official insignia of the President of Germany, reserved for heads of state and their spouses
  - Grand Cross 1st class of the Order of Merit in exceptional finish (Großkreuz in besonderer Ausführung, Grand Cross 1st class in exceptional finish), reserved for former Federal Chancellors of Germany
  - Grand Cross 1st class of the Order of Merit (Großkreuz, Grand Cross 1st class)
- Great Cross of Merit (Großes Verdienstkreuz)
  - Grand Cross of the Order of Merit (Großes Verdienstkreuz mit Stern und Schulterband, Great Cross of Merit with Star and Sash)
  - Knight Commander's Cross of the Order of Merit (Großes Verdienstkreuz mit Stern, Great Cross of Merit with Star)
  - Commander's Cross of the Order of Merit (Großes Verdienstkreuz, Great Cross of Merit)
- Cross of Merit (Verdienstkreuz)
  - Officer's Cross of the Order of Merit (Verdienstkreuz 1. Klasse, Cross of Merit 1st Class)
  - Cross of the Order of Merit (Verdienstkreuz am Bande, Cross of Merit)
- Medal of Merit (Verdienstmedaille)
  - Medal of the Order of Merit (Verdienstmedaille, Medal of Merit)

The President of the Federal Republic holds the Grand Cross special class ex officio. It is awarded to him in a ceremony by the President of the Bundestag, attended by the Chancellor of Germany, the President of the Bundesrat, and the Supreme Court President. Other than the German president, only a foreign head of state and their spouse can be awarded with this highest class. There is also the provision of awarding the Grand Cross 1st class in exceptional finish (Großkreuz in besonderer Ausführung), in which the central medallion with the black eagle is surrounded by a stylized laurel wreath in relief. This Grand Cross 1st class in exceptional finish has been awarded only to three persons, the former German chancellors Konrad Adenauer, Helmut Kohl and Angela Merkel.

== Insignia ==
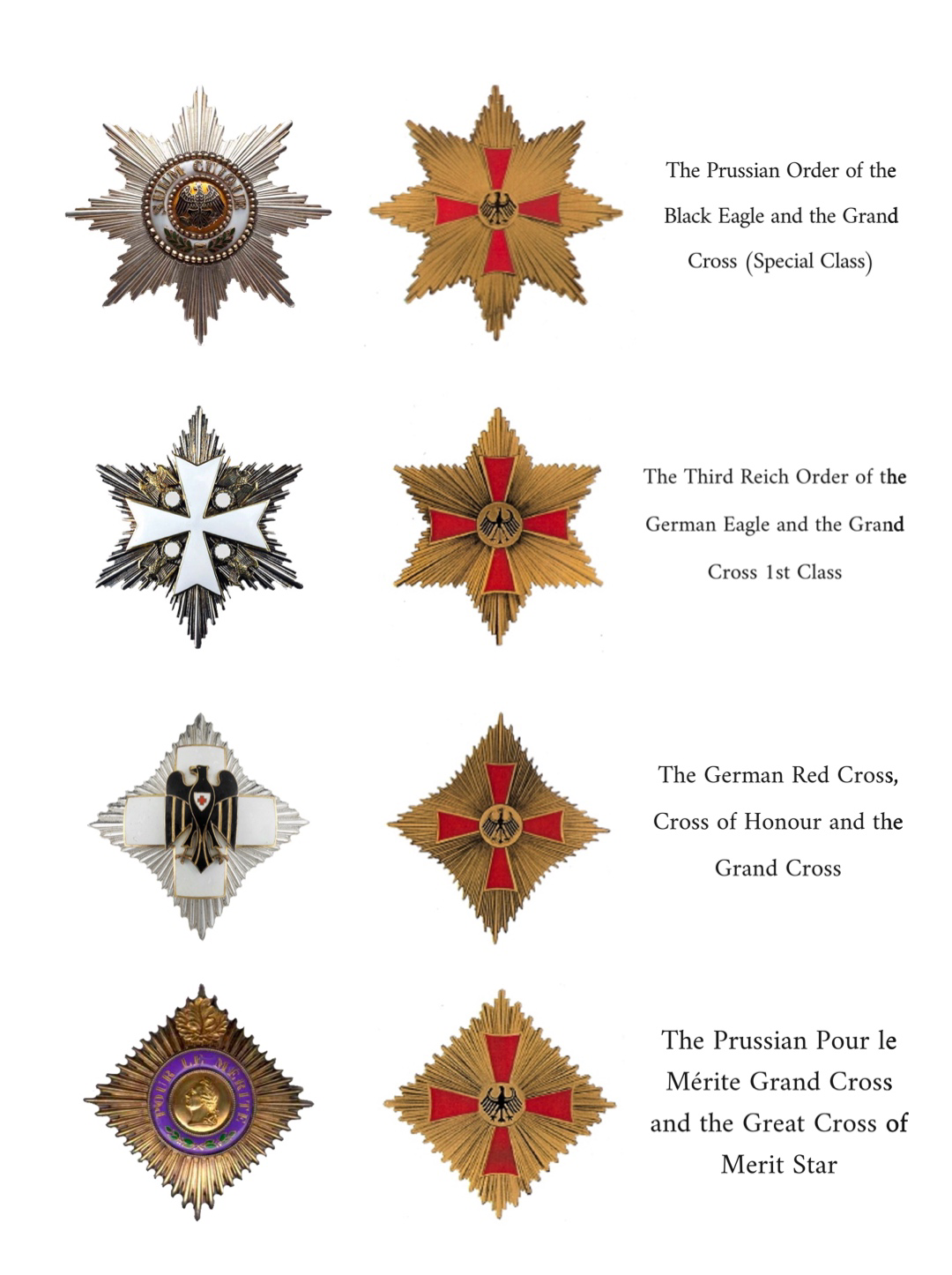
Comparison showing the similarities and same basic design of the various stars of the Bundesverdienstkreuz and the Prussian Order of the Black Eagle, The Third Reich Order of the German Eagle, The Third Reich Red Cross of Honour and the Prussian Pour le Mérite

Except for the lowest class, the medal, the badge is the same for all classes, but with slightly different versions for men and women (slightly smaller badge and ribbon for women):

The badge for the Member and Officer classes however are only enamelled on one side, and flat on the reverse. The badge of the Order is made up of a golden four-armed cross enamelled in red, with a central gold disc bearing a black enamelled German federal eagle (Bundesadler).

The star is a golden star with straight rays, its size and points vary according to class, with the badge superimposed upon it. An interesting fact about the stars, of which no less than four grades use one, is that they all have the same basic shape as various other breast stars from German history.

- 8-pointed golden Star: Grand Cross special class - the same shape as the Prussian Order of the Black Eagle
- 6-pointed golden Star: Grand Cross 1st class (and special issue design if golden oak crown between the cross branches around the medallion) - the same shape as the Third Reich Order of the German Eagle
- 4-pointed golden Star: Grand Cross (Grand Cross of Merit with Star and Sash) - the same shape as the Third Reich Social Welfare Decoration
- silver Square-upon-point: Knight Commander (Grand Officer) - the same shape as the Grand Cross of the Pour le Mérite

The reasoning behind this is not clear. It is not known if this is deliberate or coincidence, as the tools used to make the stars were in short supply after the war, and using stamping dies that were readily available and could be reused or acquired from other manufacturers would have been a good way of cutting costs and simplifying production in a Germany only just starting to experience the Wirtschaftswunder. It is of course possible that this could have been deliberate, and a way to celebrate German history in the design of the new honour for the Federal Republic. This is unlikely however as two stars represent decorations awarded during the Third Reich, and the other two are of Prussian origin. Prussia itself had only been recently abolished and the legacy of so called "Prussian militarism" was not something openly celebrated in the new Federal Republic of Germany.

The riband of the Order is made up of the colours of the German flag. The pattern is a large central band of red, edged on both sides in a smaller band of gold-black-gold.

== Gallery ==
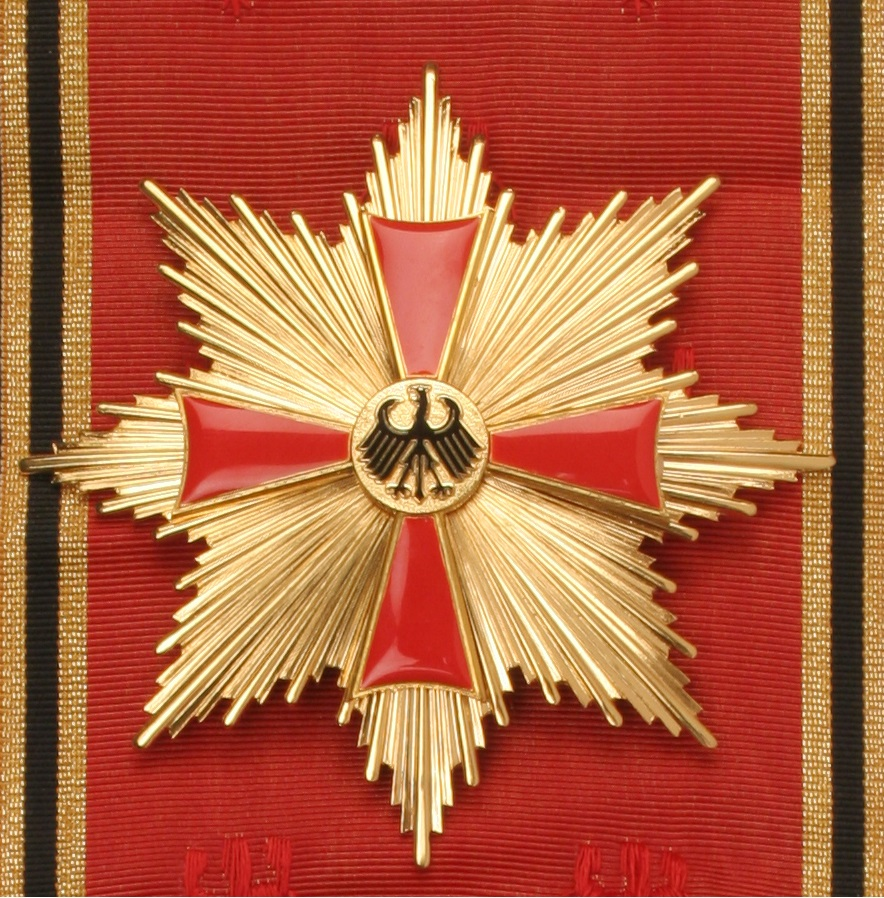
Insignia of the Grand Cross special class

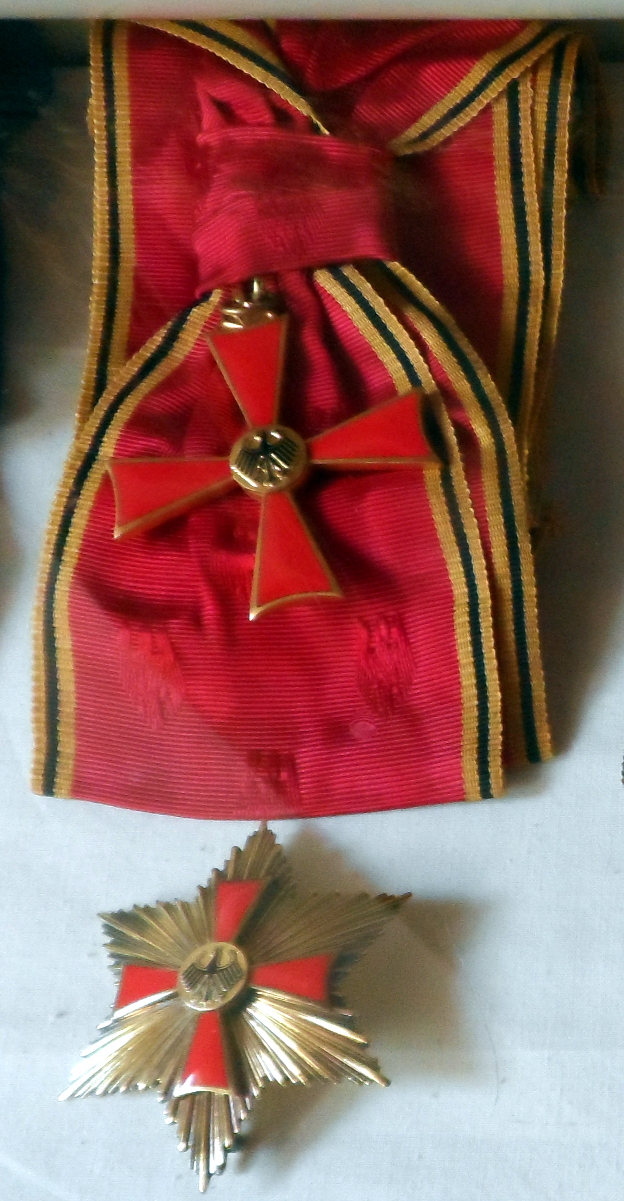
Insignia of the Grand Cross 1st class

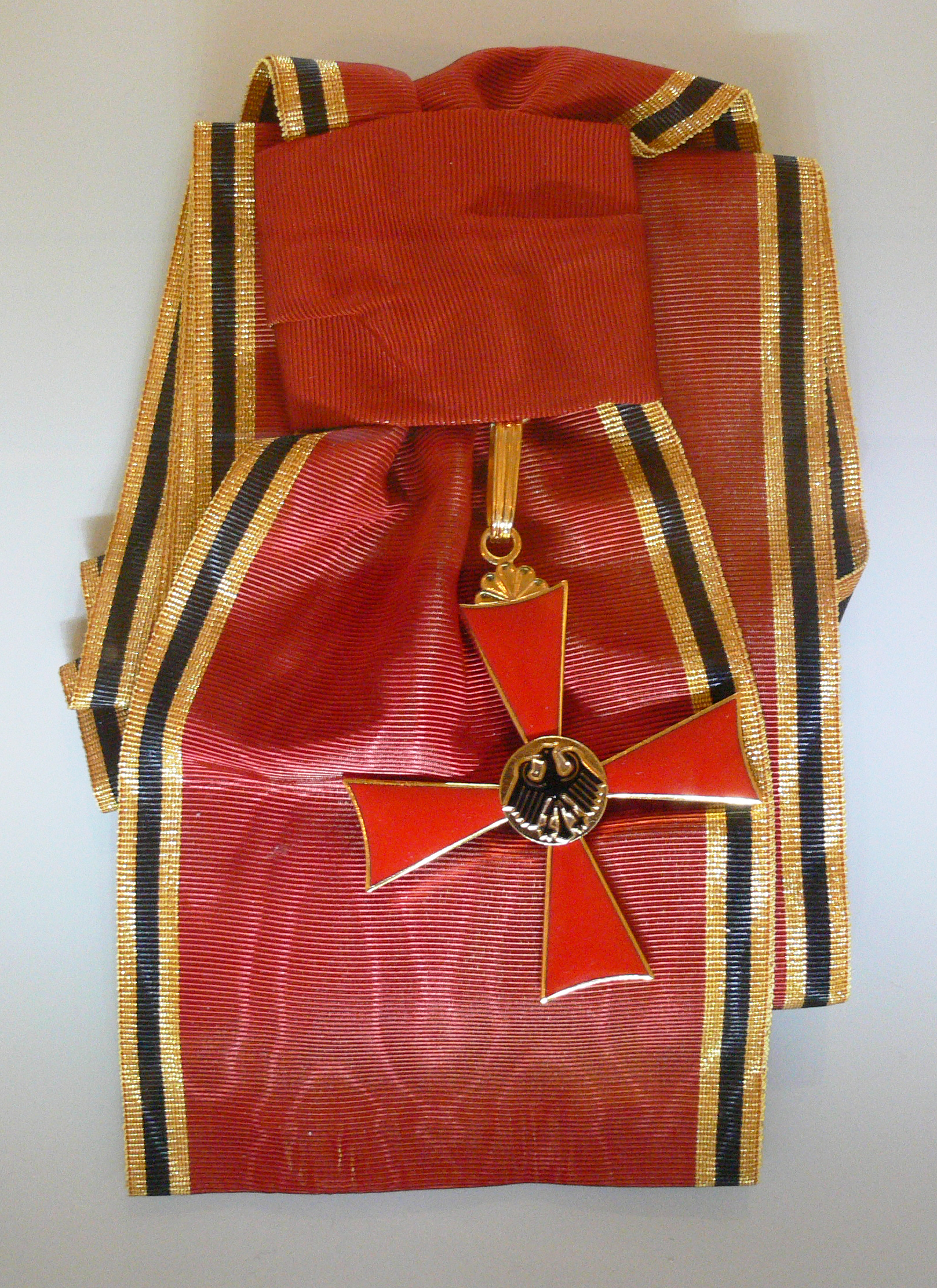
Badge and riband of the class "Grand Cross"
(without showing the star)

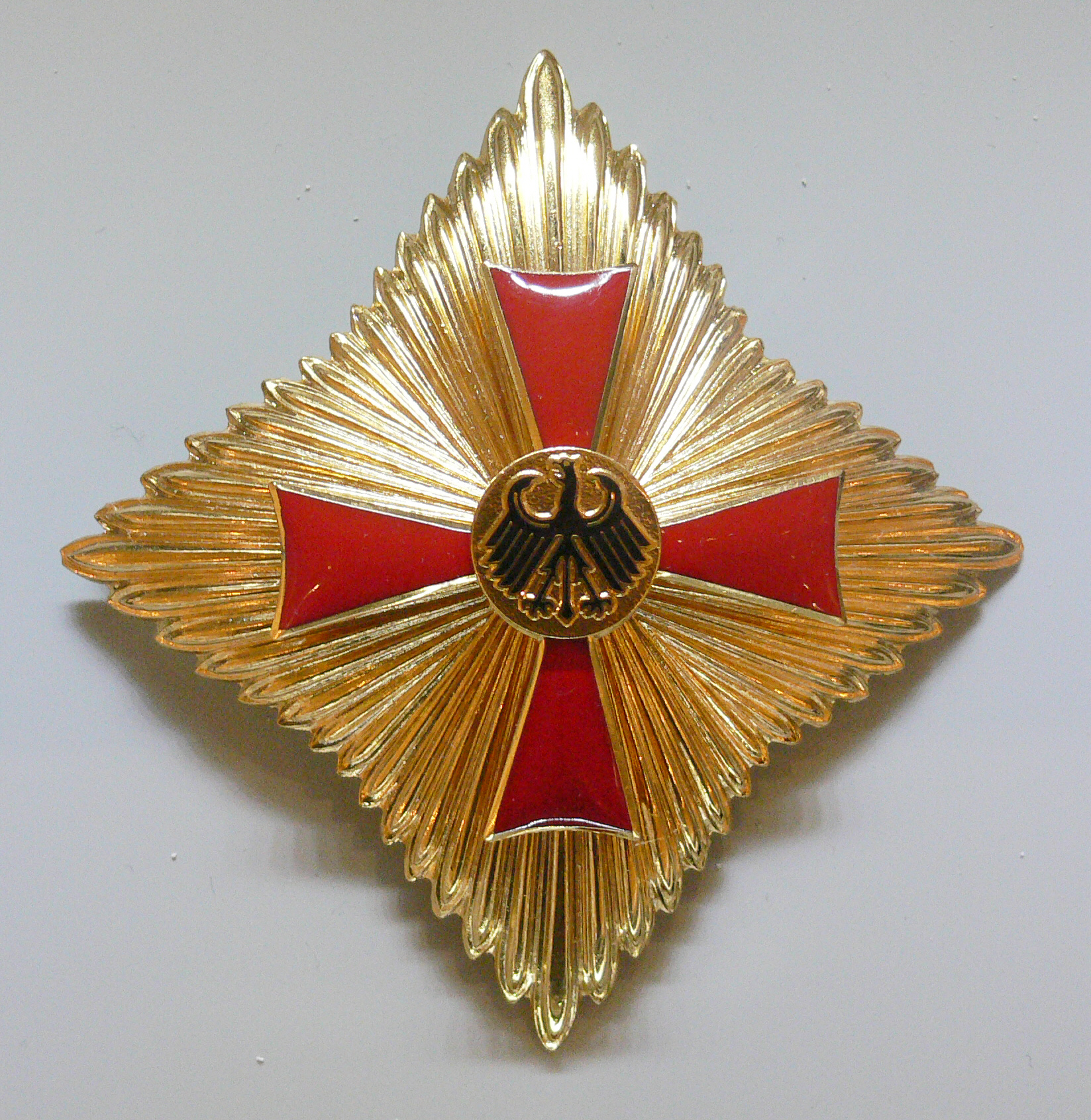
Star of the class "Grand Cross"

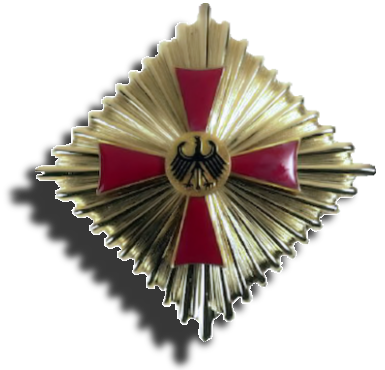
Star of the class "Knight Commander's Cross"

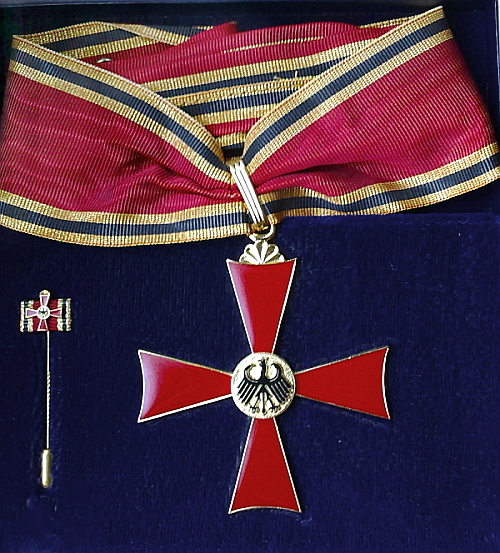
Badge suspended on neck riband of the class "Commander's Cross"

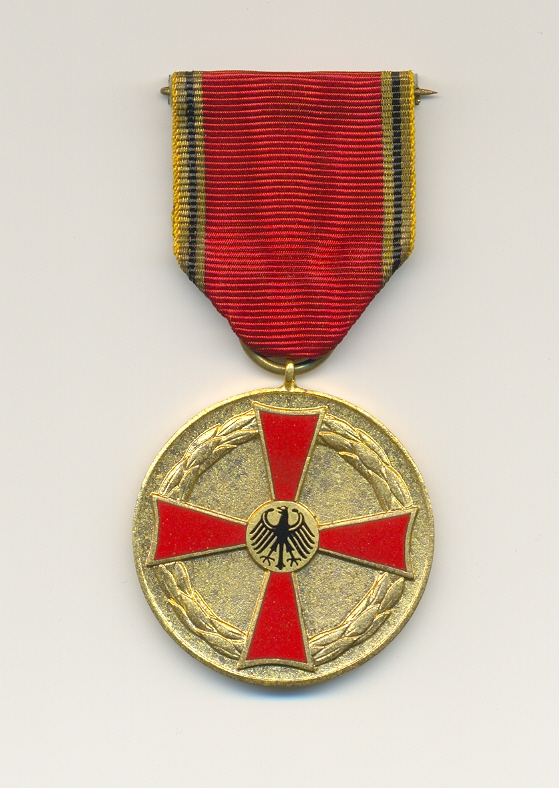
Medal of Merit, the lowest class of the Order

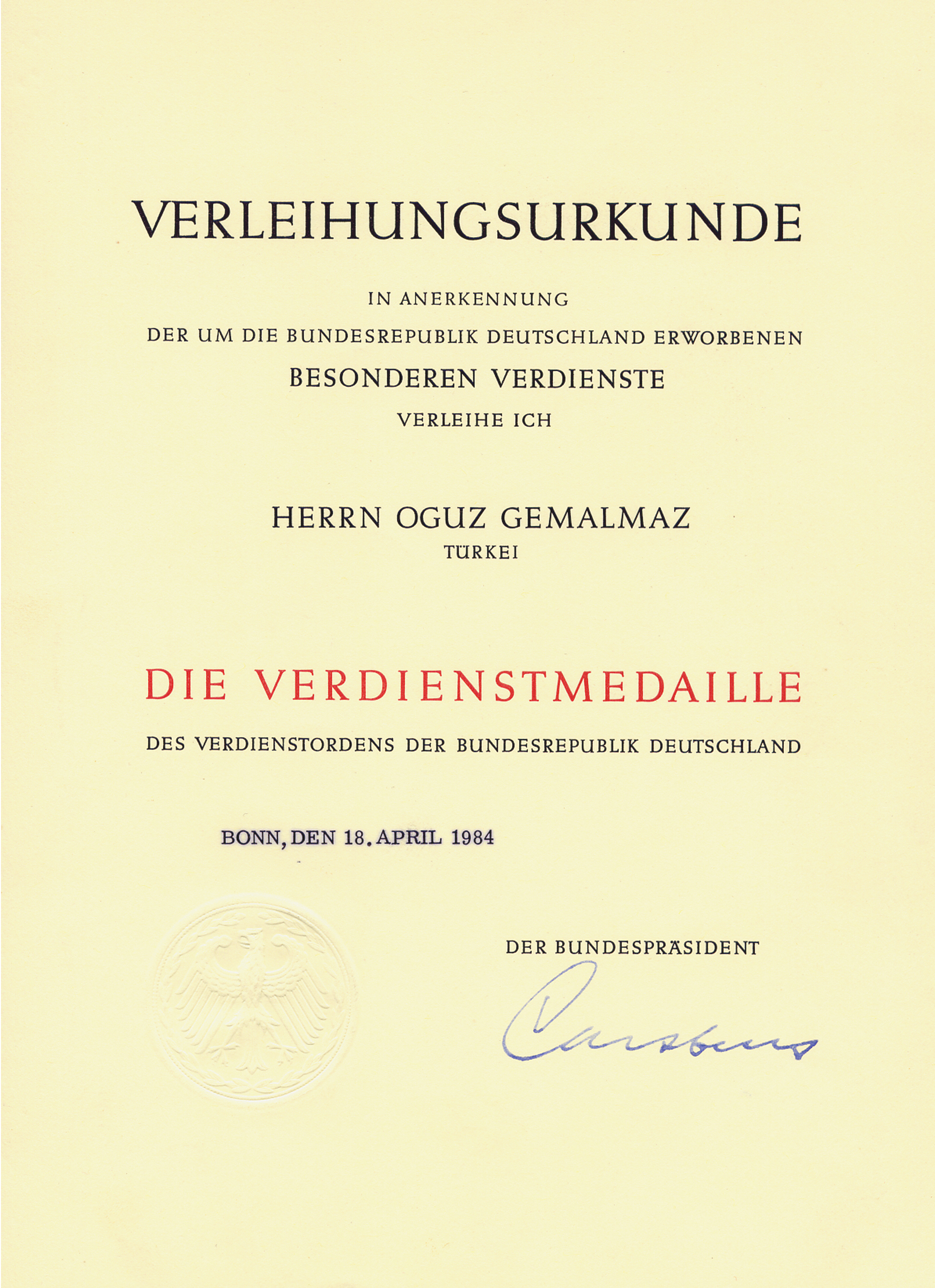
Certificate of Bestowal

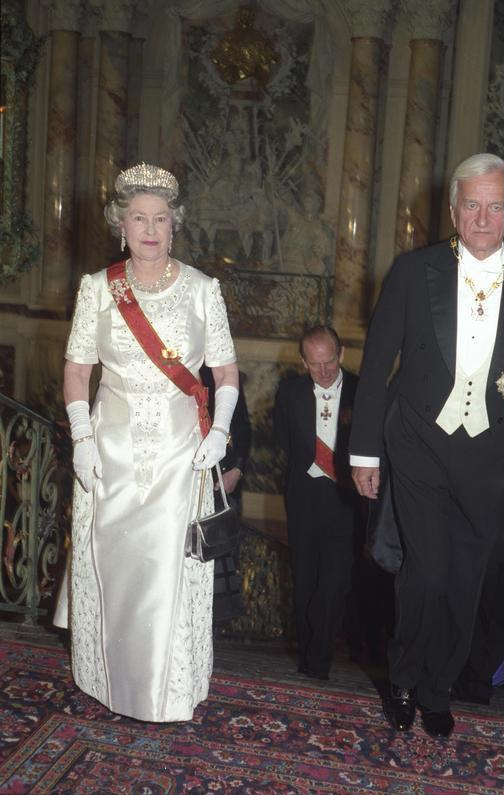
Foreign head of state Queen Elizabeth II with the Grand Cross special class, 1992 visit in Brühl (Rhineland), Germany

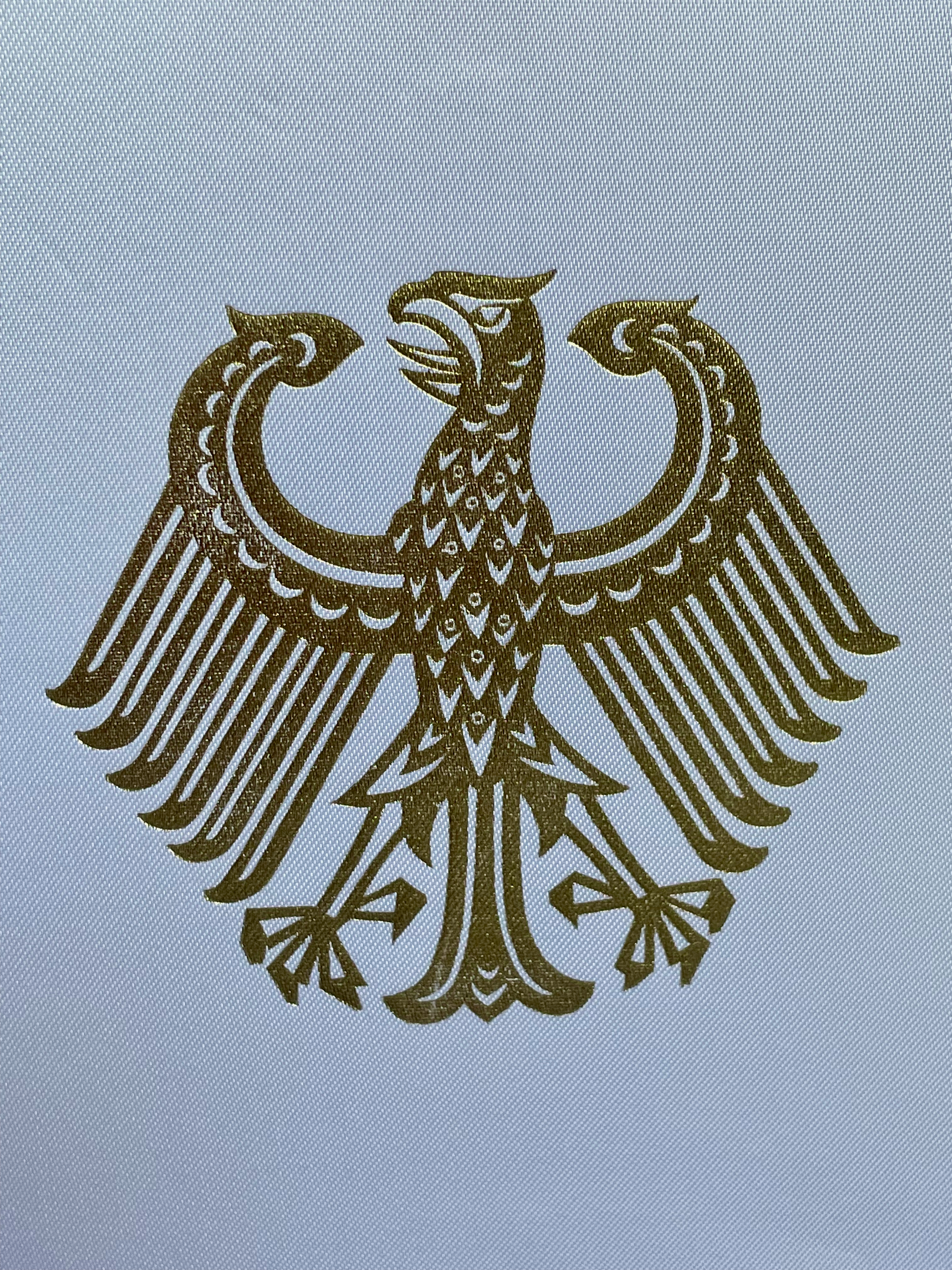
The gold foil German Bundesadler found on the inner lid of the Order

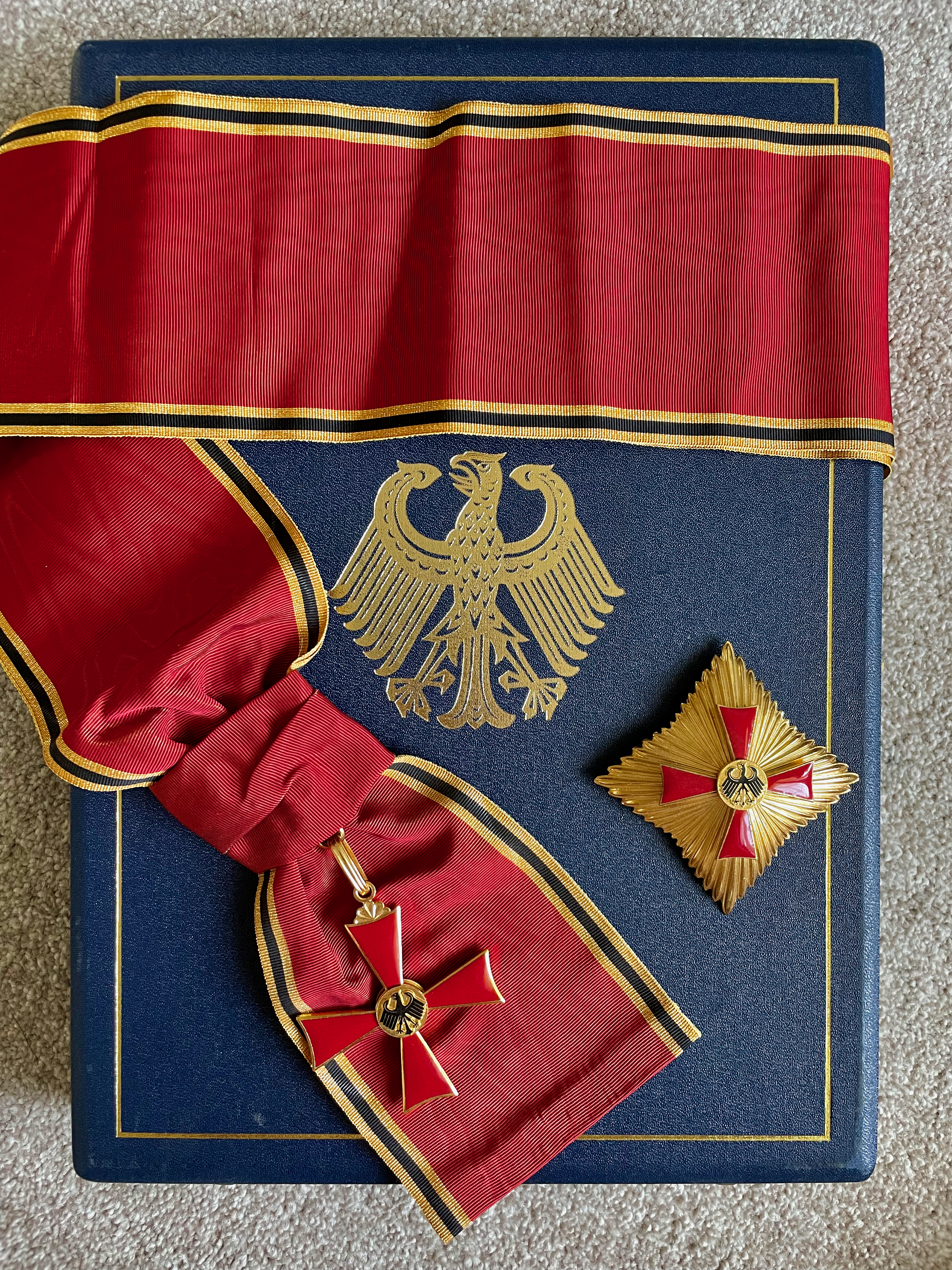
Grand Cross with Star and Sash

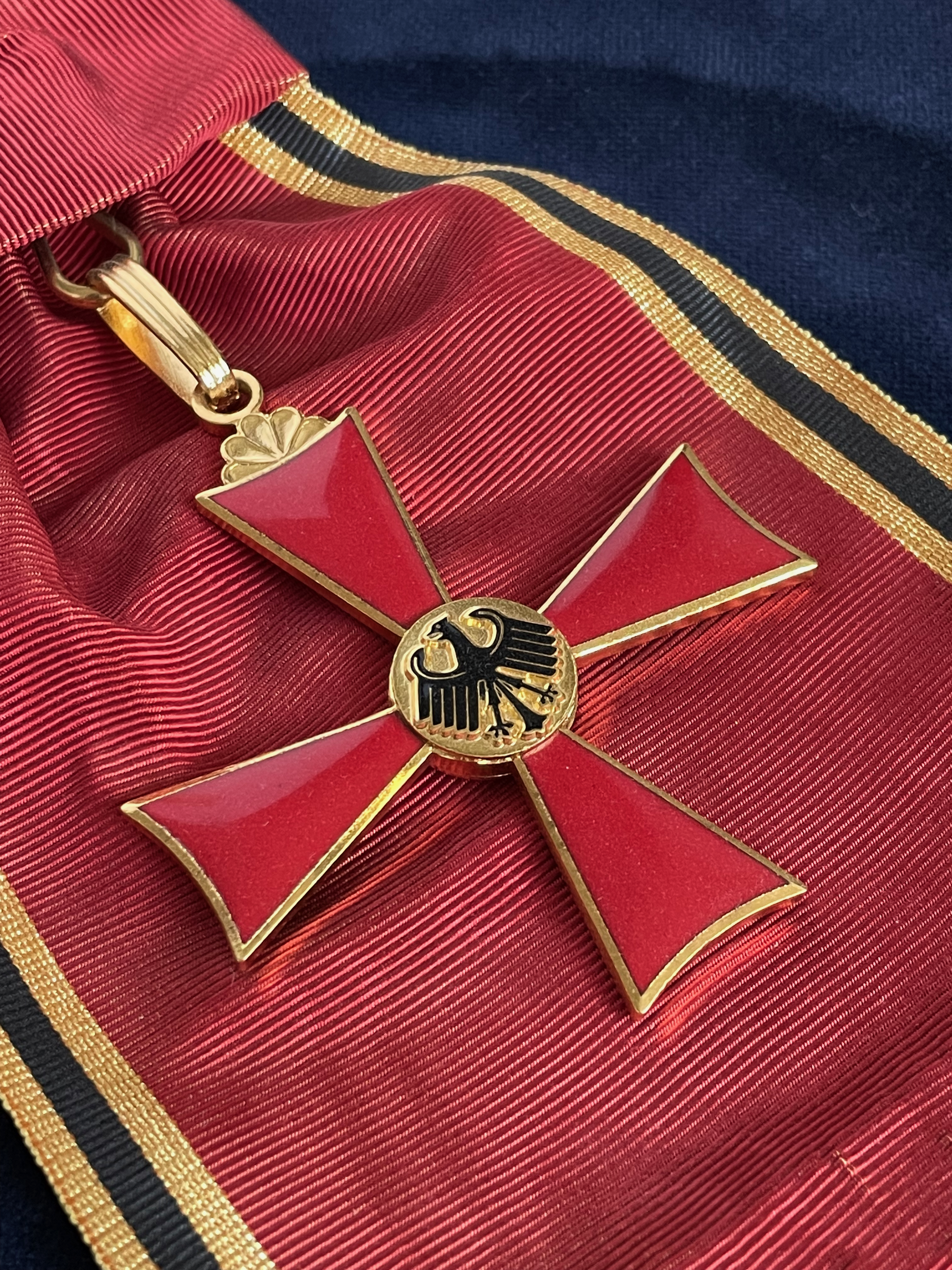
Grand Cross with badge

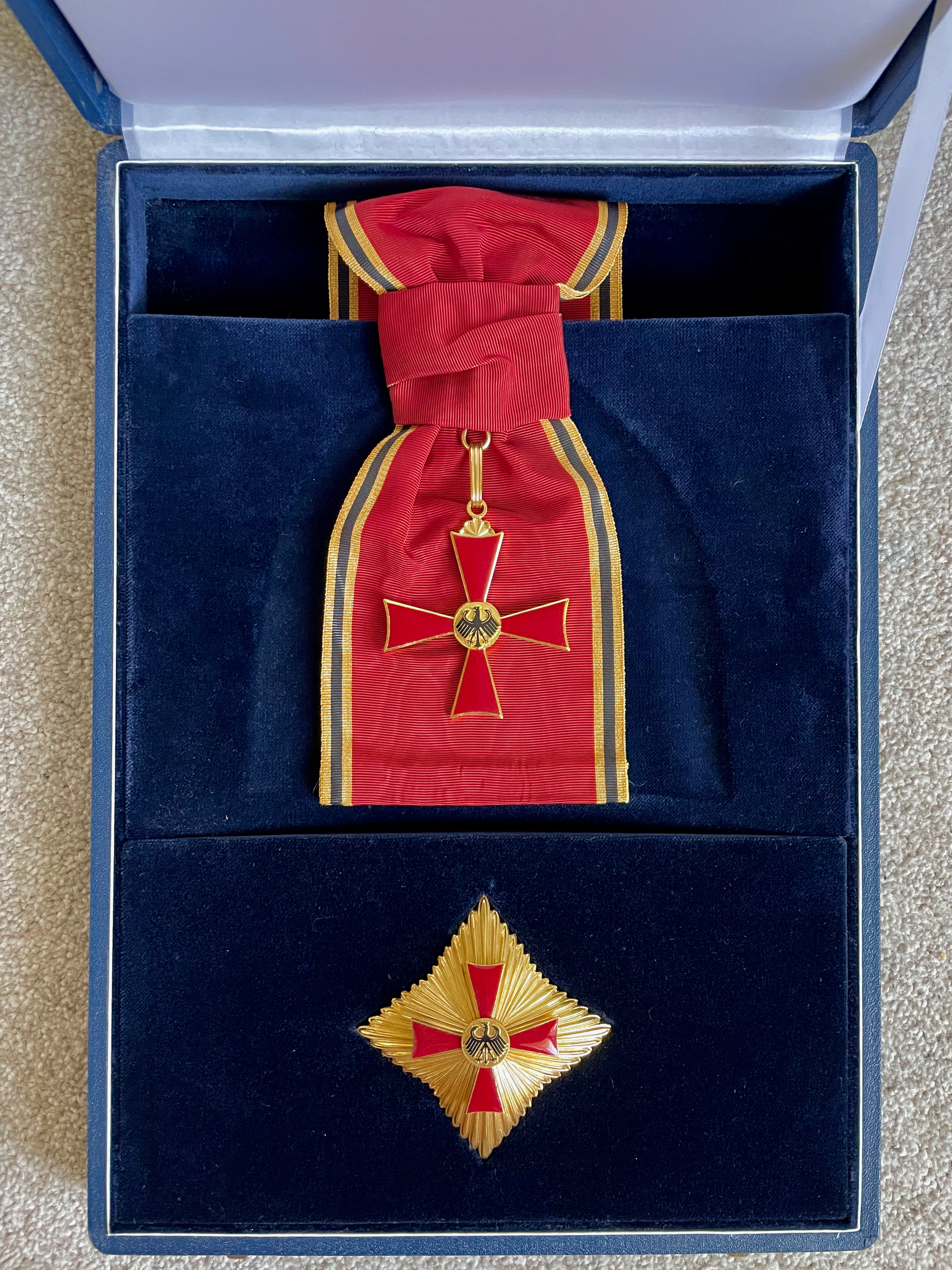
Grand Cross with Star and Sash in case

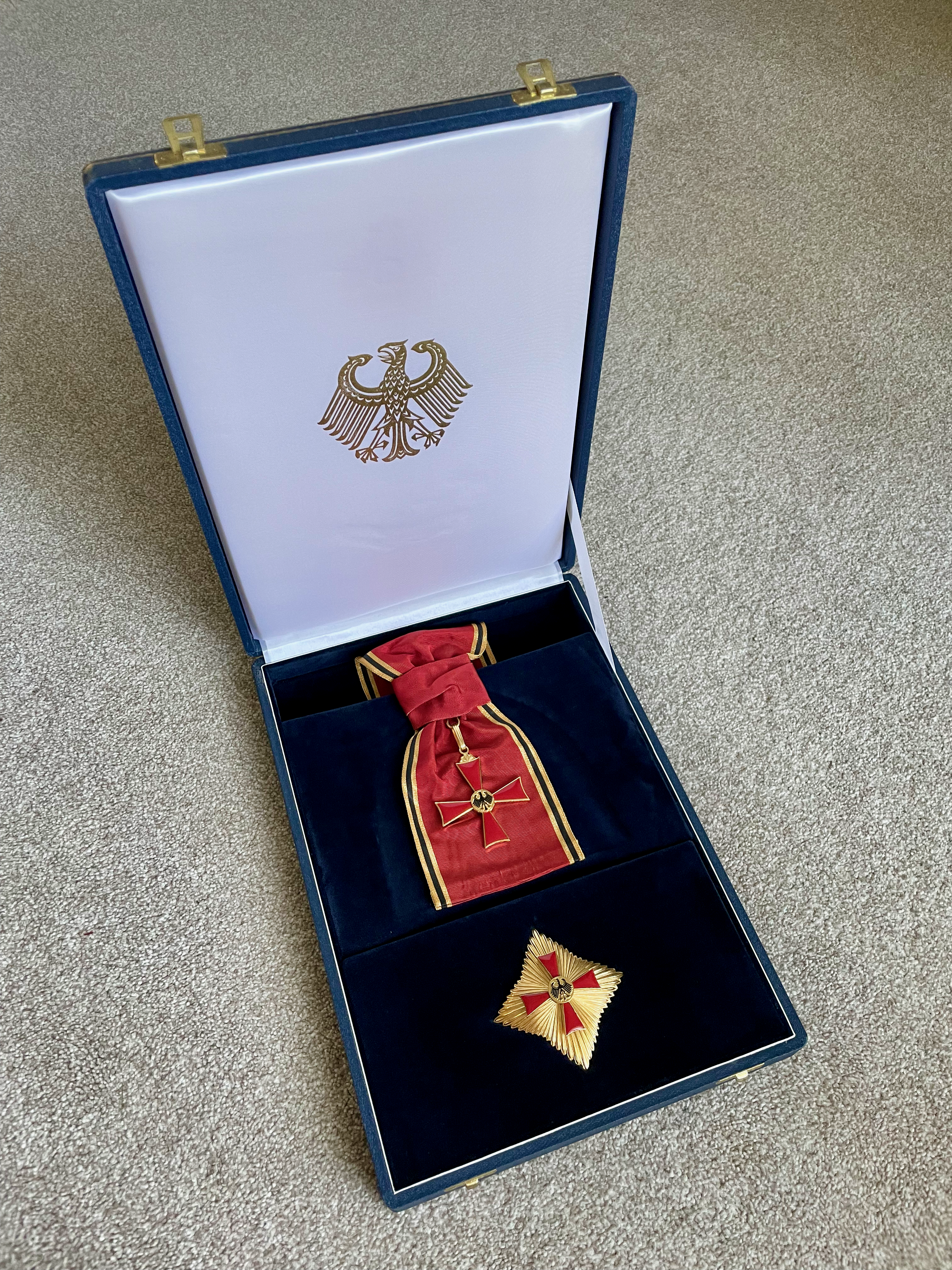
Grand Cross with Star and Sash set

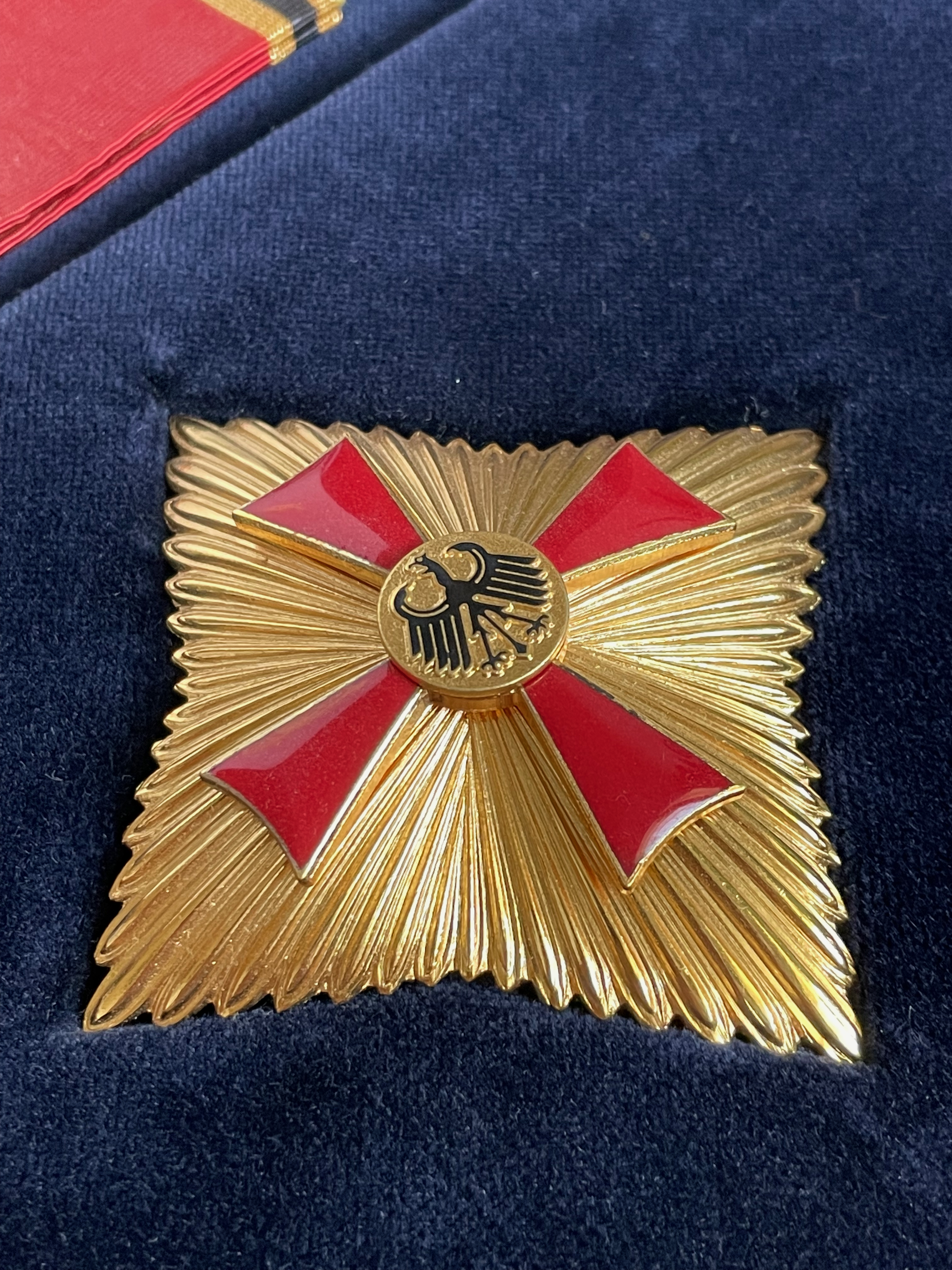
Grand Cross Star

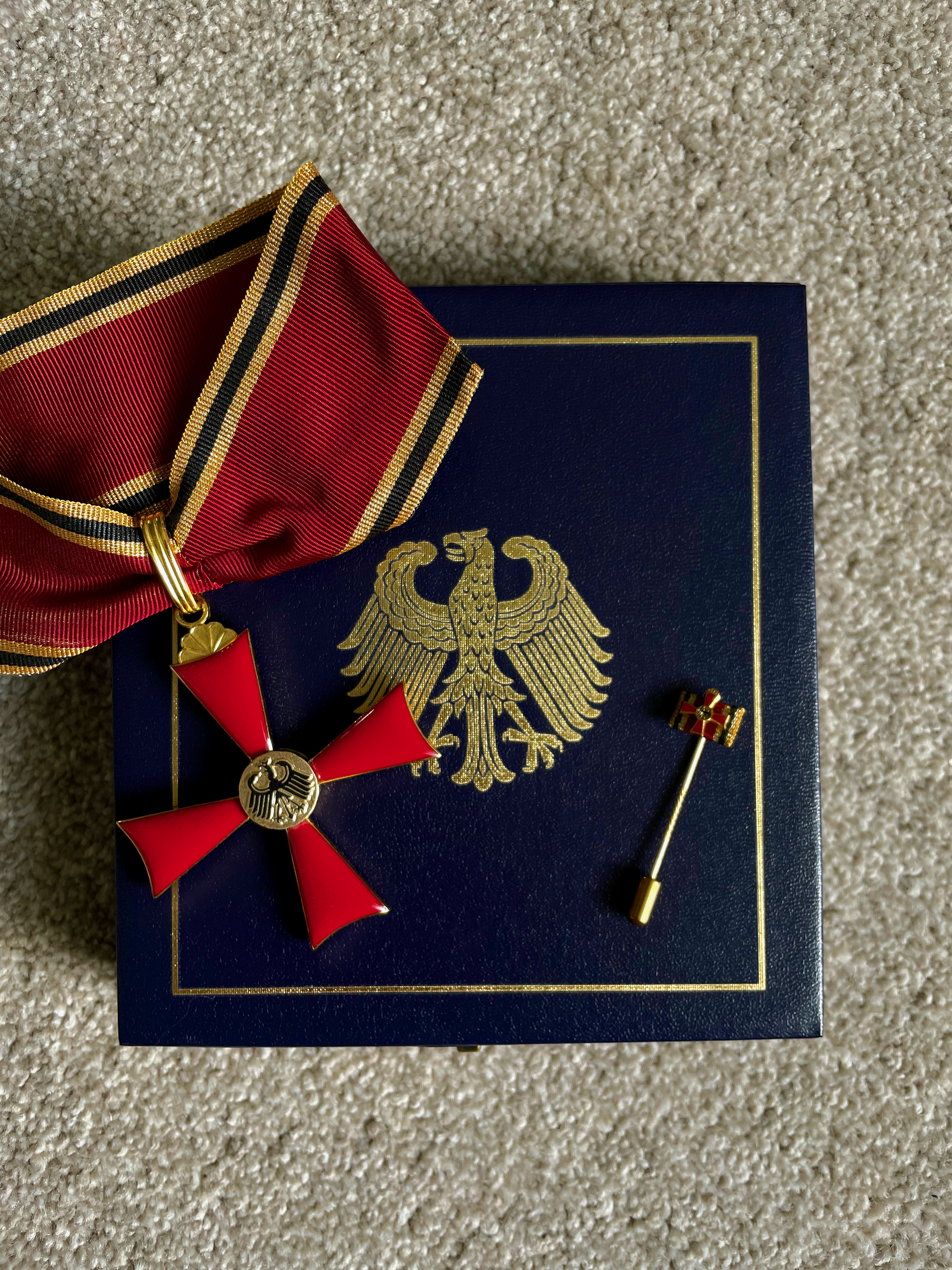
Commander's Cross set

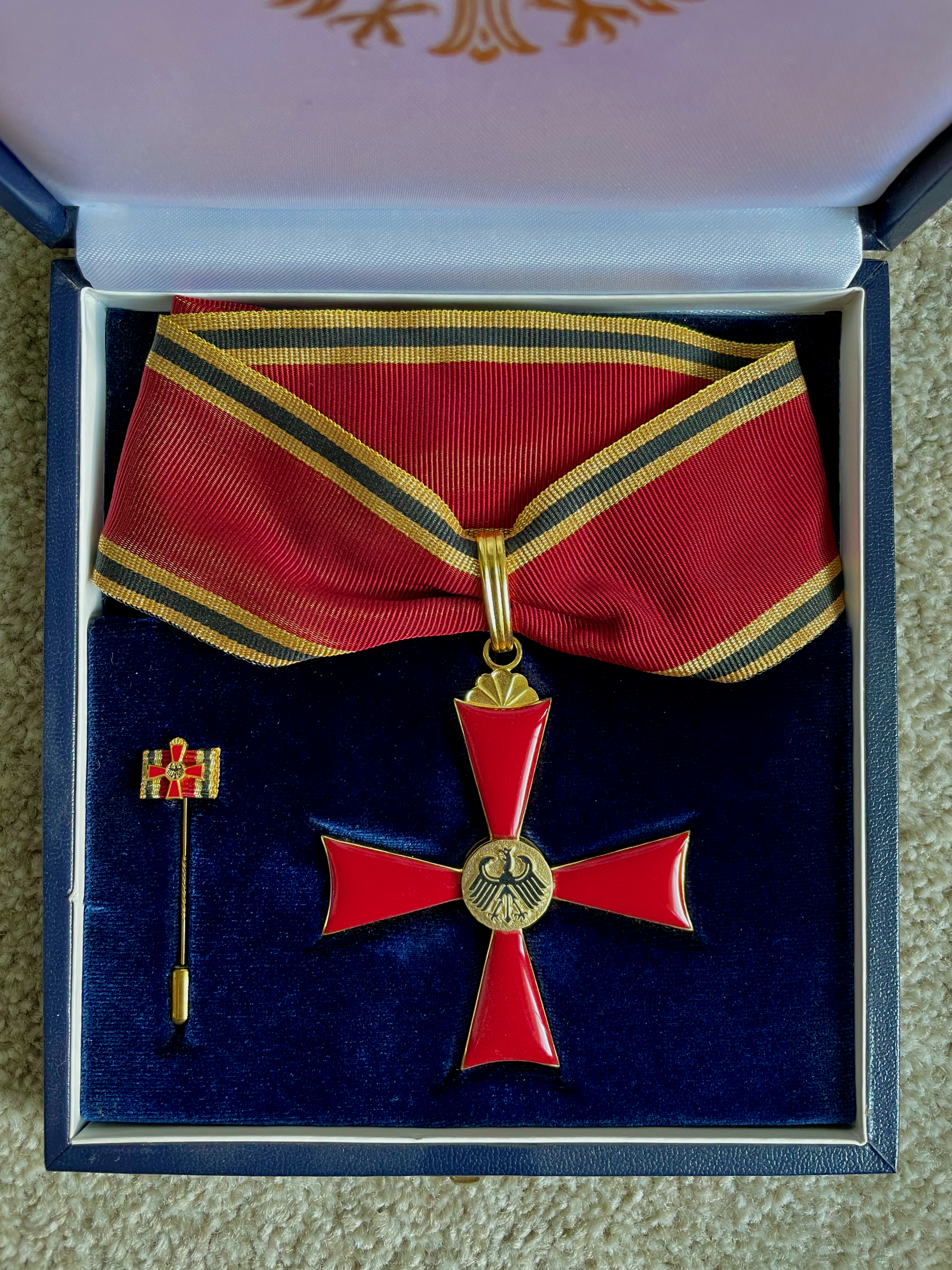
Commander's Class in case

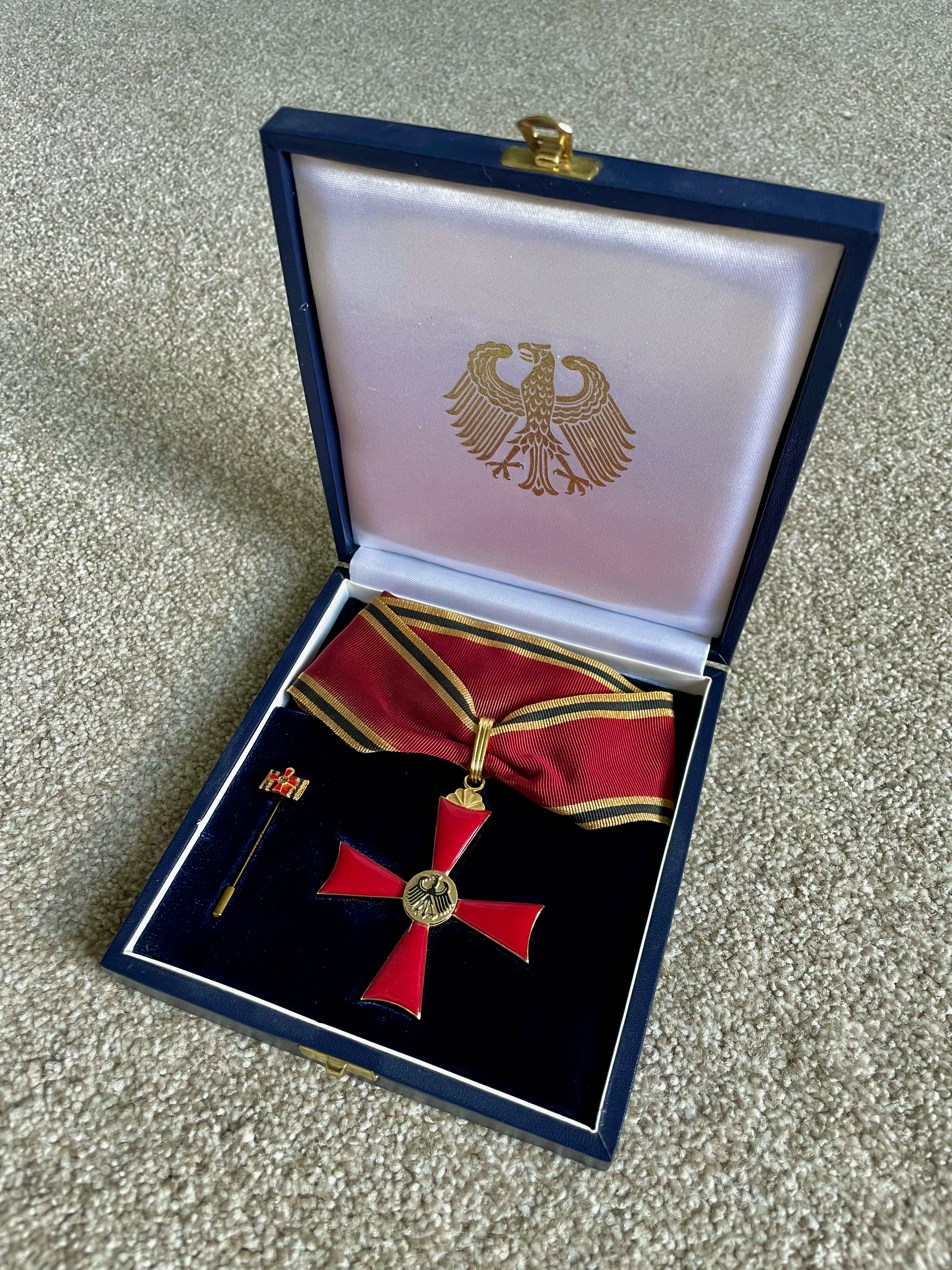
Commander's Class

== See also ==
- Iron Cross
- Order of Karl Marx
- Pour le Mérite
- Knight's Cross of the Iron Cross
- Awards and decorations of the German Armed Forces
