= Filippo Drago (pharmacologist) =

Italian pharmacologist, neurologist, and psychiatrist

Professor Filippo Drago
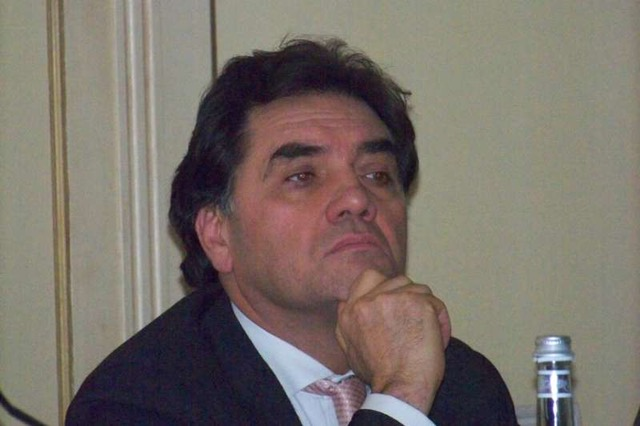
- Born: Filippo Drago; 5 December 1954 (age 71); Italy
- Education: University of Catania; Utrecht University
- Scientific career
- Workplaces: University of Szeged; Weizmann Institute of Science; University of North Carolina at Chapel Hill; University of Catania
- Thesis: Prolactin and Behavior (1982)
- Doctoral advisor: David de Wied

Filippo Drago (born 5 December 1954 in Enna, Italy) is an Italian pharmacologist, neurologist and psychiatrist.

He is a professor of pharmacology at the University of Catania, Italy.

Filippo Drago has several patents in the field of pharmacology and is author of more than 500 papers published in peer-reviewed journals.

Additionally, Filippo Drago is a certified Italian freelance journalist.

== Career ==
Filippo Drago obtained his medical degree in 1978 at the University of Catania, Italy, and obtained a PhD in pharmacology in 1982 at the University of Utrecht, in the Netherlands, working with David de Wied.

Afterwards, he worked at the University of Szeged in Hungary, the Weizmann Institute of Science in Israel, and the Department of Psychiatry of University of North Carolina at Chapel Hill, USA.

From 2004 to 2010, he was a member of the Scientific Board of the Italian public agency for drug evaluation, the "Agenzia Italiana del Farmaco" (AIFA). In 2012, he was also appointed as a member of the board for pricing and reimbursement of the same agency.

At the University of Catania, he was, among other roles, the Director of the International PhD Program in Neuropharmacology (2002–2013) and he is the coordinator of the master's degree in drug regulatory affairs. He is also a professor of Pharmacology and, since 2014, the Director of the Department of Biomedical and Biotechnological Sciences.

From 2012 to 2014, Drago was President of the Federation of European Pharmacological Societies (EPHAR). He is currently the President of the Italian branch of the Association for Research in Vision and Ophthalmology (ARVO), IT-ARVO, and the Association for Ocular Pharmacology and Therapeutics (AOPT), an organization that welcomes members from disciplines related to ocular pharmacology and its therapeutic applications.

In June 2019, as part of the "Università Bandita" investigation conducted by the Catania Public Prosecutor's Office, he – together with other eight professors and the Dean of the University of Catania – was investigated for having influenced the outcome of public competitions for the assignment of positions within the University of Catania. As a result, he was temporarily suspended from his role as Professor, pending the outcome of the judicial proceedings.

He was fully readmitted as Professor in October 2019, when he was elected President of the CERD (Center for Research and Consultation on HTA and Drugs Regulatory Affairs) of the University of Catania.

In 2020, Filippo Drago was appointed as chairman of the International Advisory Council within the Human Health Education and Research Foundation (HHERF).

In March 2024, the Public Prosecutor's Office requested 7 years and 10 months of prison for Drago following the "Università Bandita" investigation. In January 2026, following the investigation and proceeding, he was sentenced to two years' imprisonment, suspended.

== Awards ==
In 2014, Drago was awarded the Order for the International Merit of Blood by the International Federation of Blood Donor Organizations. In the same year, he was also awarded the "ARVO Silver Fellow", an honour conferred to ARVO members "for their individual accomplishments, leadership and contributions to the Association".

In 2014, Drago was among the recipients of the "Rodolfo Paoletti Medal", which was established to "honour distinguished pharmacologists who have achieved merits for the discipline of pharmacology in Europe".

In 2021, Filippo Drago became an "ARVO Golden Fellow" for his commitment "to advance research worldwide into understanding the visual system and preventing, treating and curing its disorders”.

== Personal life ==
Filippo Drago is married and has four children.
