= Filippo Drago =

Filippo Drago may refer to:

- Filippo Drago (pharmacologist)
- Filippo Drago (rugby union)
