= Associazione Volontari Italiani Sangue =

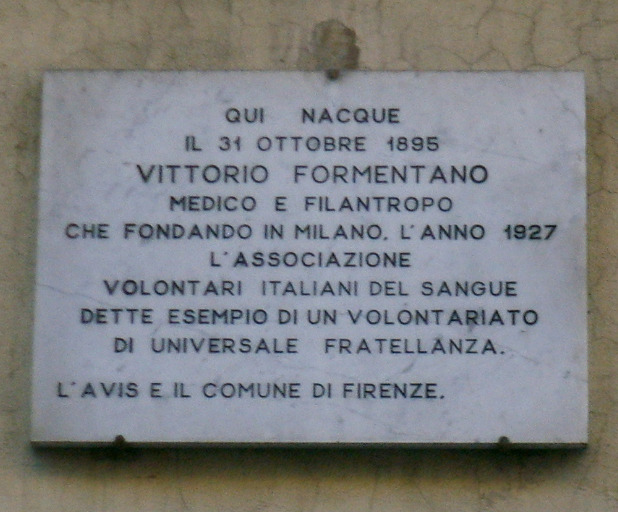
Plaque on Via Sant'Antonino in Firenze (Florence), marking the place of birth of Dr. Vittorio Formentano, founder of AVIS.

The Associazione Volontari Italiani del Sangue (AVIS) ("Association of Voluntary Italian Blood Donors") is the major Italian non-profit and charitable organisation for blood donation, bringing together over a million volunteer blood donors across Italy. It is headquartered in Lombardy, Italy.

== History ==
=== Pre-war ===
In the early twentieth century, the ABO blood group system was discovered by Austrian scientist Karl Landsteiner, and its application in World War I led to a rise in the awareness of therapeutic blood donation. In Italy, there were few hospitals that could provide blood transfusions, and those that did held lists of suppliers; this closed market allowed a high price (up to several months' wages) to be charged to patients for a single unit of blood.

In 1927, Dr Vittorio Formentano founded the first voluntary organisation in Italy, in Milan. Two years later, his group of unpaid donors became the Associazione Volontari Italiani Sangue, the first organisation of its kind in Italy.

The goals of the group were "organizing a network of regular donors under constant medical control, to fight the blood trade, to spread the idea that blood is a natural and anonymous gift and to enhance scientific knowledge of transfusion practice". The organisation developed quickly across Northern Italy, and in 1934 Il Duce, Benito Mussolini, issued a Regio Decreto ("king's decree") asking the organisation to add an "F" for fascista (fascist) to its acronym. The decree also embedded blood donation into a set of administrative bodies across Italy, and legally acknowledged the right of professional blood donors to profit from their donations. Francesco Carnelutti, a leading scholar of the time, even argued for the right to take blood without the donor's consent.

=== Post-World War II ===
After the collapse of the fascist government in 1946, the new Italian Republic abrogated responsibility for blood donation to the Italian Red Cross, who were given a near-monopoly on blood donation until 1950, when, following concerted political pressure, AVIS was re-recognised and granted an official title (Associazione Volontari Italiani del Sangue).

Structured on a territorial basis, AVIS was permitted to operate autonomously, and began to slowly spread a culture of voluntary, unpaid blood donation across the country — although, even to this day, the north of Italy has a freer attitude towards blood donation than the south, where voluntary, free donation is only expected for a family member. By 1955, Formentano had become the president of IFBDO, the International Federation of Blood Donor Organisations.

=== 1967 — Collection, Preservation and Distribution of Human Blood Act ===
In the 1950s and early 60s, the sale of blood in Italy was still permitted, and due to the shortages, particularly in the south of the country, a black market in blood trade spread. Blood was known as "oro rosso" ("red gold").

On 14 July 1967, the Collection, Preservation and Distribution of Human Blood Act was passed by the Italian Government. The law regulated every aspect of the blood system in Italy, and marked the beginning of a stream of complex regulations surrounding blood donation, storage and transfusion in Italy — the laws specified every detail of how blood donation could take place, down to standardising the furniture in donation centres. The law did not, however, criminalise the paid donation of blood — only specifying the price charged not be "manifestly exorbitant". The right of a worker to receive a paid day off for freely donating blood, however, was enshrined in Italian law.

=== 1990 — Blood Reform Act ===
In 1990, following a maelstrom of media and public pressure after a series of incidents involving Italian hemophiliacs receiving HIV-infected blood, President Francesco Cossiga passed the Blood Reform Act, which repealed the 1967 Act, and forced all transfusion activity, including that of AVIS, to take place under the auspices of the Italian National Health Service, and required all blood donations to be unpaid.

Between 1989 and 1999, AVIS had 871,779 donating members, and received 1,531,572 donations in Italy (plus 2,370 donations in Switzerland). In 1999 a total of 1,913,299 units of blood were donated; a shortfall of around 400,000 units. Few regions of Italy (mostly in the north) are self-sufficient in blood and plasma.

AVIS was granted the Medaglia d'oro al merito civile (the gold medal for civil merit) on January 7, 1998.
