= Blood Donation Badge of Honor =

German award for blood donation

Blood Donation Badge of Honor Blutspendeehrennadel
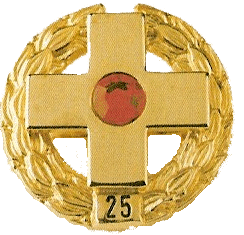
- Award for 25 donations
- Type: Ribbon
- Awarded for: Voluntary unpaid blood donations
- Description: ribbon
- Presented by: German Red Cross, Blood donation service of German armed Forces
- Eligibility: Blood donors
- Status: Currently awarded
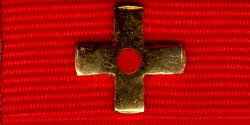
- Ribbon for ten donations

The Blood Donation Badge of Honor (German: Blutspendeehrennadel) is a German award presented by the German Red Cross and by the Blood donation service of the Bundeswehr for voluntary unpaid blood donations.

== Description ==
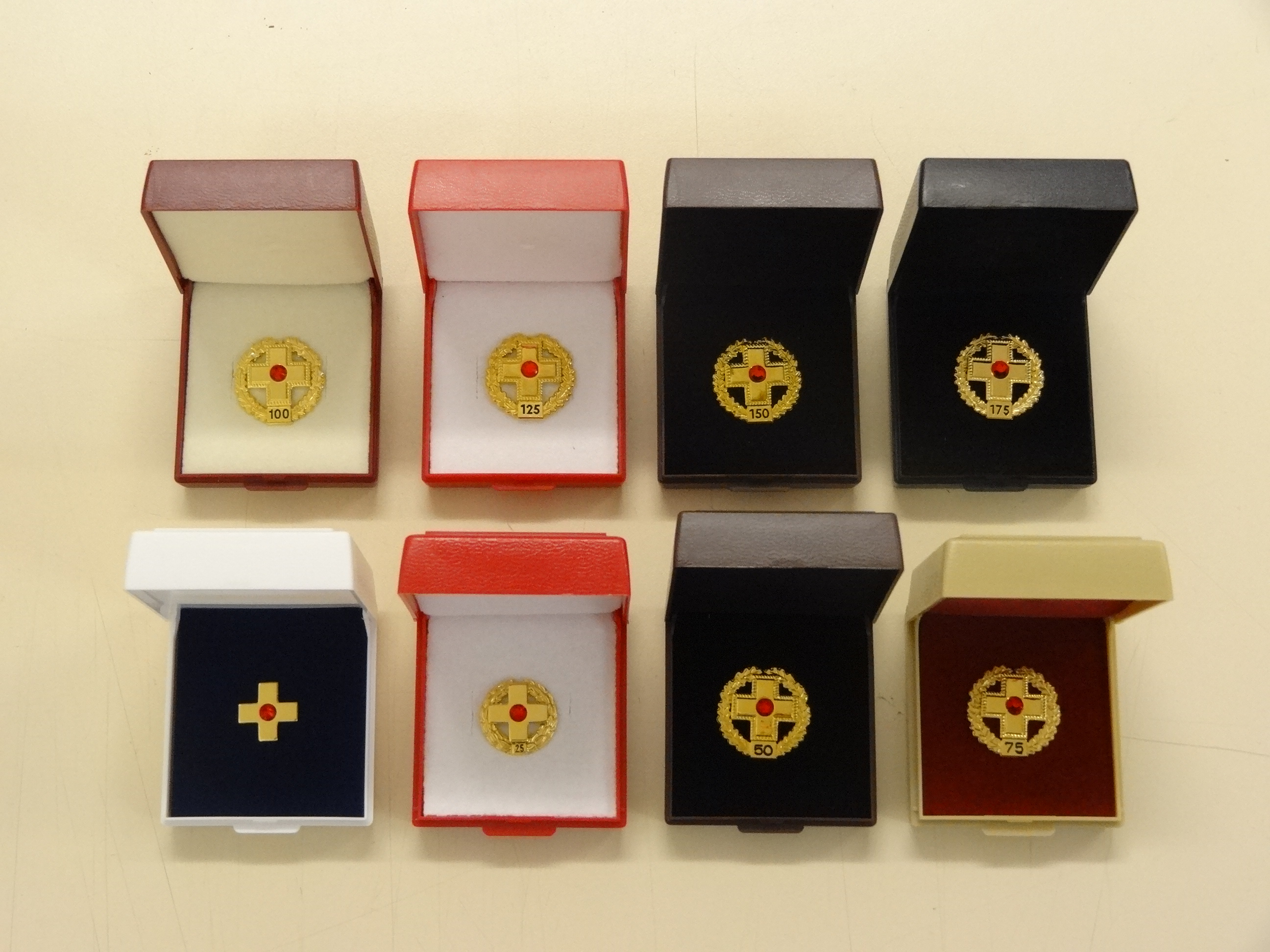
Various Blood Donation Badges of Honor

The badge depicts a golden cross with a red dot in the center, symbolizing a drop of blood on red background. The awards of 25 or more donations feature a laurel wreath around the cross. The awards of 50 or more donations also feature diamonds around the center. The number of donations is also shown at the bottom of the laurel wreath. If worn as a ribbon bar, a miniature version of the badge is attached to a red ribbon bar.

Blood donation service of the German armed forces:

For 3; 6; 10; 15; 25; 40; 50; 75; 100; 125; 150; 175; 200; 225; 250; 275 and 300 donations.

Donors with three or ten blood donations receive their certificate of honor directly on site. Donors with 25 donations will receive their badge of honor on site and will be sent their certificate. In the local associations, donors are honored from the 50th donation. From the 75th donation, the design of the badge of honor differs in the form of a medal with the inscription "Donate blood save lives", a cross in a stylized drop of blood and a garnet in a double wreath. In addition, donors who donate more than 75 blood receive an invitation to a major cross-district donor honor.

German Red Cross

For 10; 25; 50; 75; 100; 125; 150; 175; 200; 250; 275 and 300 donations.

Bavarian Red Cross

For 3; 10; 25; 50; 75; 100; 125; 150; 175; 200; 225; 250; 275 and 300 donations.

== Status ==
The ribbon is not an official German medal according to the Law regarding Titles, Medals and Decorations. It is usually awarded by the local Red Cross chapter, the local mayor, or for military service members the ribbon is awarded by the commanding officer.

Members of the German fire departments, the Federal Agency for Technical Relief and other rescue services may wear the ribbon bar for the badge on their uniform or service dress.

The Blood Transfusion Service of the Bundeswehr awards a lapel pin to those soldiers who make voluntary donations of blood. The ribbon is currently not permitted to be worn on uniforms of the Bundeswehr.

== See also ==
- German Red Cross Decoration
- Red Cross Medal (Prussia)
- Order for the International Merit of Blood
