= Julio Correa =

Paraguayan poet

- Born: Julio Correa; August 30, 1890; Asunción, Paraguay
- Died: July 14, 1953 (aged 62); Luque, Paraguay
- Known for: Poetry
- Notable work: Ñane mba’era’y Guerra aja Karaí Ulogio; Tereho yevy fréntepe

Julio Correa Myzkowsky (August 30, 1890 – July 14, 1953) was a Paraguayan poet in Guarani language.

He started to publish his poems in 1926. Encouraged by the poet Manuel Ortiz Guerrero, he began writing a column entitled "Dialoguitos Callejeros" (Small Street Dialogues) in the newspaper Guarani, of Facundo Recalde. His talent became apparent during the Chaco War (1932–1935). His work in the Guarani language was well received by the public and he became known as an author, actor and director.

From 1934 to 1936, he published his poems in the magazine Guarania, of Natalicio González. Those became part, later on, of the book Body and Soul (1943). In 1947, he was arrested because of his writings. The civil war that year had a negative effect on the author, and he became depressed. He remained isolated in his country house in Luque, where he died on July 14, 1953.

== Childhood and youth ==
Correa's maternal grandfather, Myzkowsky, was of Polish origin, while his father was Portuguese. Correa left school at a young age.

He came from a well-to-do family that had fallen on hard times as a result of adversities in the aftermath of the war of 1870. A descendant of Brazilian people, his father fought in the war and once it ended, decided to stay in Paraguay, like many other soldiers at the time. As a child Correa grew among people that spoke Guaraní, country people and peons, and it was from that time he started to acknowledge their struggles to survive. As an adult, he discovered himself as able to read this people, as an interpreter to them, in the theater as in the social action.

He was a close friend of the sculptor Erminio Blotta from Rosario, Argentina, who became an honorary citizen of Paraguay.

== His family ==
He was married to the actress, Georgina Martínez. Together they founded a theatre company, with which he traveled to every part of Paraguay, carrying a message condemning the injustice of large entailed lands and the exploitation of the working country people.

== Trajectory ==
Walter Wey, a Brazilian researcher, makes a colorful portrait of the multifaceted Correa: "Who does not know and admire Julio Correa? Poet, dramatist, businessman, storyteller and distiller of politic and literary poisons. Maybe the victims, men and women of his satirical stories, felt disrespected but all of them know those stories by memory. It was because of this that he was persecuted and sometimes jailed.

He was a creator of the Guarani theatre, a great author and actor in it. He felt the Paraguayan problem was the unjust distribution of land, because as Justo Pastor Benítez wrote: "the Paraguayan people are just a mere occupant of his own land". Correa took this saying for truth and became a fighter for the cause, standing against foreign and national large entailed land. In his house in Luque there are no books, only farm animals, nothing that proclaims it to be the house of a poet.

Julio Correa was a poet without culture, and without the desire or preoccupation to acquire it. The poems in Spanish language he gathered in his book Alma y Cuerpo (Body and Soul) closed a period in time and marked the beginning of a new path that would be widened by Hérib Campos Cervera, with the introduction of the "literature of vanguard". It is Campos Cervera who completes the description of Correa, saying: "He is the great creator of images of our society and problematic, the drama of misery, land, blood and jealousy".

== Work ==
His production includes:

- "Ñane mba’era’y" (What cannot be ours)
- "Guerra aja" (During the war)
- "Karai Ulogio" (Mister Ulogio)
- "Tereko yevy fréntepe" (Go back to the front)
- "Pleito rire" (After the dispute)
- "Péicha guarante" (Just like that)
- "Sandía yvyguy" (Hidden watermelon)
- "Karu poka" (Poor eating)
- "Honorio causa" (Because of Honorio)
- "Po’a nda ja jokoi" (Luck is not stopped)
- "Sombrero kaá" (Guarani expression that means "the lover of another one's love")

Julio Correa also wrote "Yvy yara", "Toribio", "Yuaijhugui reí", "Po’a rusuva" and La culpa de bueno.

Among his stories are "Nicolasia del Espiritu Santo" (1943), "El Padre Cantalicio", "El borracho de la casa" and "El hombre que robó una pava" (unfinished); all of these were published after his death.

== Last years ==
He died on July 14, 1953, in Luque, Paraguay, a city close to the Paraguayan capital. His house is now the Museum Julio Correa.
