= Mayans (surname) =

Mayans is a Spanish surname. Notable people with the surname include:

- Antonio Ortiz Mayans (1908–1995), Paraguayan writer and composer
- Carlos Mayans (born 1948), American politician
- Fernando Mayans Canabal (born 1963), Mexican politician
- Gregorio Mayans (1699–1781), Spanish historian, linguist and writer
- Humberto Domingo Mayans (born 1949), Mexican politician
- José Mayans (born 1957), Argentine politician
- Luis Mayans y Enríquez de Navarra (1805–1880), Spanish noble and politician
- Marjorie Mayans (born 1990), French rugby union player
