= Hérib Campos Cervera =

Paraguayan poet and writer (1905–1953)

- Born: March 30, 1905; Asunción, Paraguay
- Died: August 28, 1953 (aged 48); Asunción, Paraguay
- Occupations: Poet, short story writer, play writer
- Writing career
- Notable work: Ceniza Redimida
- Literary movement: Modernist literature

Hérib Campos Cervera (1905-1953) was a Paraguayan poet and writer.

== Childhood and youth ==
Campos was born in Asunción, Paraguay, on March 30, 1905, son of Spanish parents, Herib Campos Cervera, also a poet, and of Alicia Diaz Perez, sister of the great intellectual Viriato Díaz Pérez.

He was an intern at the Colegio San Jose de Asuncion, an institution he was to call “a jail” more than once, which shows his vital and free spirit as a youth. Besides philosophy and math, he also dedicated himself to literary criticism and especially to poetry.

In the prologue of the second edition of “Ceniza Redimida” the scholar Miguel Angel Fernandez writes: “An unhappy childhood, far away from his parents, apparently marked his life, and in his poetry we may find the traces of this first stage of his life. His adolescence and youth were not more fortunate...”

His value as a poet is undeniable. All of the scholars on Paraguayan literature say that his work is the starting point of a new poetic conception joining the not always easy new path of vanguardism.

In his book “La poesia paraguaya - Historia de una incognita” the critical and intellectual Brazilian Walter Wey says: “Campos Cervera put the Paraguayan literature in the American rhythm and at the same level of the actual poetry of the continent. For that, he didn't need to get into the heart of the Hispanic-American. He only did what was expected from his country: a deep study of the modern natives which stayed in the objective aspects of life and nature. He then moved to the social and human subjects deepening, taking advantage of the immense and unexplored folk stories. In this sense, he also opened the way to the new generations.

If he didn’t show completely the revelation of Paraguay as it was expected from his intuition, he did show how the future could be revealed. He also showed that in almost 100 years of poetry, the Paraguayan poets despite describing the county they didn’t identify with it and the life style.”

== History ==
He was a collaborator of magazines such as Juventud, Ideal and Alas in the 1920s, his production of the time is similar to the current of the postmodernism. He used to sign with the pseudonym "Alfonso Monteverde”. In 1931, his participation in the acts of October 23 marked his first exile, first to Buenos Aires, Argentina and then to Montevideo, Uruguay. By then, he was clear in his ideas towards the left, maybe influenced by the anarchy and the Marxist socialists he contacted in Argentina and Uruguay.

In 1938, three years after his return to Paraguay, together with Josefina Pla - who was also back from Europe after the death of her husband, Andres Campos Cervera (Julián de la Herrería) he is located in the centre of a movement which has, among others, Augusto Roa Bastos, Oscar Ferreiro, Ezequiel Gonzalez Alsina and Hugo Rodriguez Alcala as members, who were later to be known as “Generacion del 40” in Paraguayan literature. The meeting place of those young people was the “Vy’a raity” - soon Elvio Romero joined - and his productions are to be read in magazines such as the Ateneo Paraguayo, Noticias and the literary supplement of the newspaper “El Pais“.

In 1940, when the president of the republic, General Jose Felix Estigarribia, died in a mysterious aviation accident, General Higinio Morinigo took over. He was in the same political line of the nationalist authoritarians of fascist Europe; his government will last until 1948. A year before, in 1947, one of the worst phases of a bloody civil war was to take place, which among many things deprived the country of the talent and creativity of its best artists and intellectuals. Among them, Herib went into exile to Buenos Aires, until he died.

Cesar Alonso de las Heras and Juan Manuel Marcos, wrote in a text for students of the Paraguayan contemporary literature that "Campos Cervera is the father of Paraguayan literature. Although in fiction, essays and theater he might have to dispute first place with Casaccia, Barrett and Correa, respectively, we cannot doubt his influence on poetry. His poems…show for the first time in this country mastery of surrealist metaphors, the techniques of Neruda, the rhythm of Nicolas Guillen, the nostalgic air of Alberti – to whom he dedicated his work Regresarán un día (English: "They shall return one day").

"The nostalgia and the hope, the verbal elegance and the spiritual transparency distinguish his very personal style, deeply rooted in the national circumstances of the poet."

== Works ==
In 1950 he published his only poetry book available during his lifetime, Ceniza redimida, which gathered 28 of his best poems. “Hombre secreto” was his second poem book, which was to appear after his death. Other works were the story “El buscador de fe”, the short novel El ojo enterrado, and the theatre play Juan Hachero, which was not produced on stage and still unedited, as well as his novel Hombres en la selva and the poem book Romancero del destierro, which originals were taken during his exile in Montevideo.

== Last years ==
He was married to Tita de los Rios, and later divorced. He had children with Maria Carmen Palermo. He died in Buenos Aires, on August 28, 1953.

The journalist Humberto Perez Caceres, workmate of Herib in the newspaper “ Democracia” in Buenos Aires, transmitted his last words to his country: ”The art, the politics, the cultural works, must drink the best of the nationality. The process has an itinerary from the national to the universal, not the opposite. Let it not be a useless art, not beauty divorced from the country. The country, his service, his redemption, its happiness, its justice must constitute the motivation of all work. The national... our country, our men, our countrymen, and workmen, our women. It is to them, to their elevation, that he artist must dedicate all of their efforts.”
