= Association for Ocular Pharmacology and Therapeutics =

The Association for Ocular Pharmacology and Therapeutics (AOPT) is an organization that welcomes members from disciplines related to ocular pharmacology and its therapeutic applications. The mission of AOPT is the sustenance of a scientific network aiming the dissemination of knowledge in the field of ocular disease, pharmacology and therapeutics.

== History ==
AOPT was begun informally in the 1970s by Dr. George Chiou as special sessions at the Federation of American Societies for Experimental Biology conferences. It grew to an official separate Symposium of Ocular Pharmacology meeting of academicians, clinicians, and pharmaceutical industry at Novi, Michigan in August 1993. The participants voted to charter the organization and this was accomplished the next year with the first AOPT meeting held in New Orleans, Louisiana in January 1995. The founding board comprised Drs. George Chiou (president), David Lee (vice-president), Hitoshi Shichi (treasurer), and Herbert Kaufman (trustee). During the early FASEB years, Chiou also established the Journal of Ocular Pharmacology, now the Journal of Ocular Pharmacology & Therapeutics. The history of AOPT is closely related to the Association for Research in Vision and Ophthalmology (ARVO).

== Activity ==
The mission of AOPT is to help researchers and eye-care professionals in their efforts toward the understanding and the treatment of eye diseases. AOPT scientific dissemination involves preclinical and clinical pharmacologists and researchers. Scientific dissemination is promoted through biennial meetings and the peer-reviewed journal: Journal of Ocular Pharmacology and Therapeutics (JOPT).

=== Journal ===
JOPT is the official journal of AOPT. It is a multidisciplinary journal that covers the latest findings related to pharmacodynamics and pharmacokinetics of pharmaceuticals used in the treatment of ocular disorders. The journal is published 10 times per year. This journal is peer reviewed with on line access prior to journal publication and it is available in 170 countries (http://home.libertpub.com). The journal also publishes Special Issues. The next one is "Next Generation Tissue Engineering: Inspired Models for Ophthalmic Drug Discovery". (Ashwath Jayagopal and Héloïse Ragelle guest editors. The current editor-in-chief of JOPT is W. Daniel Stamer, PhD.(Duke University, Durham, NC http://medschoolduke.edu/about-us/our-faculty/w-daniel-stamer ) On line ISSN 1557-7732 with an impact factor of 1.782. Affiliated with AOPT and ISOPT Clinical ( International Symposium on Ocular Pharmacology & Therapeutics Clinical) (http://isopclinical.com)

== Composition ==
AOPT has a diverse leadership and membership which include principal investigators, scientists, medical professionals, technicians, and students with an interest in ocular pharmacology and therapeutics. The directive committee and members come from academic institutions and private companies worldwide.

=== 2018-2020 Board of directors ===
- President: Dr. Filippo Drago
- Vice-President/President Elect: Dr. Ash Jayagopal
- Immediate Past President: Dr. Thomas Yurio
- Treasurer: Dr. Shusheng Wang
- Secretary: Dr. Cheryl Rowe-Rendleman
- Trustees: Dr. Sanjoy Bhattacharya, Dr. Claudio Bucolo, Dr. Dorette Ellis, Dr. Shahid Husain, Dr. Goldis Malek, Dr. Najam Sharif, Dr. Dan Stamer, Dr. Chi-ho To, Dr. Heping Xu
- Social Media Trustee/Advisor: Dr. Malinda Fitzgerald
- Advisor: Carol Toris

=== 2015-2017 Board of directors ===
- President: Dr. Thomas Yorio
- Vice-President: Dr. Filippo Drago
- Treasurer: Dr. Peter Kador
- Secretary: Dr. Carol Toris
- Trustees: Dr. Malinda Fitzgerald, Dr. Ash Jayagopal, Dr. Uday Kompella, Dr. Cameron Millar, Dr. Iok-Hou Pang, Dr. Ganesh Prasanna, Dr. Shusheng Wang, Dr. Christine Wildsoet

=== 2013-2015 Board of directors ===
- President: Dr. Achim H. Krauss
- Vice-President: Dr. Thomas Yorio
- Treasurer: Dr. Ganesh Prasanna
- Secretary: Dr. Jeff Kiel
- Trustees: Dr. Abbot Clark, Dr. Julie Crider, Prof. Filippo Drago, Dr. Malinda Fitzgerald, Dr. Juana Gallar, Dr. Peter Kador, Dr. W. Daniel Stamer, Dr. Oliver Zeitz

== Related societies ==
Members of AOPT and societies in the field of eye research, gather every year at the annual ARVO meeting, in which the latest findings in vision and ophthalmology research are disseminated. Societies in the field of eye research span from preclinical to clinical and a few of these societies are hereby listed:

- ARVO (Association for Research in Vision and Ophthalmology)
- ISER (International Society for Eye Research)
- EVER (European Association for Vision and Eye Research)
- ISOPT (International Symposium on Ocular Pharmacology and Therapeutics)
- ASRS (American Society of Retinal Specialists)
- AGS (American Glaucoma Society)
- ASCRS (American Society of Cataract and Refractive Surgery)
- AAO (American Academy of Ophthalmology)
- AOA (American Optometric Association)
- NAEVR (The National Alliance for Eye and Vision Research)
- Societies of Pharmacology World-Wide

== See also ==
- Eye
- Pharmacology
