= Order for the International Merit of Blood =

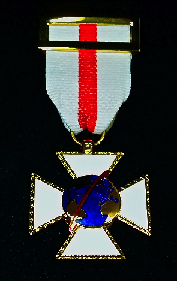
- Type: Single-grade civil decoration
- Presented by: International Federation of Blood Donor Organizations
- Status: Currently awarded
- First award: 2003
- Final award: 2012

Highlights
- Total: 57
- Total awarded posthumously: 1

Precedence
- Next (higher): None

Order for the International Merit of Blood is awarded by the International Federation of Blood Donor Organizations (IFBDO or FIODS) to personalities who made a special contribution to promote the regular, anonymous, voluntary, non-remunerated gift of blood in the world.

Proposals for award are sent to President who studies them and submits them to the Executive Council. According to IFBDO Rules of Procedure in force, except under exceptional circumstances, no more than four proposals per country can be submitted per meeting of the Executive Council.

List of recipients
Luc Adolphe TIAO, Burkina Faso	(Burkina Faso)	2012
Antonio FOLINO, Italy	(Italy)	2012
Malika MAZZINE, Morocco	(Morocco)	2012
Gherb KADDOUR, Algeria	(Algeria)	2012
Aziz Mochhoury, Morocco	(Morocco)	2012
Abdelmalek SAYEH, Tunisia	(Tunisia)	2012
Gabriel BRANCO de OLIM, Portugal	(Portugal)	2012
Edmond BRAUN, Luxembourg	(Luxembourg)	2012
René KONSBRUCK, Luxembourg	(Luxembourg)	2012
Alfred BALZAN, Malta	(Malta)	2012
Pascuale COLAMARTINO, Italy	(Italy)	2012
Jan Rudolf Jørgensen, Denmark	(Denmark)	2011
Adolfo CAMILLI, Italy	(Italy)	2011
NGUYEN CHI TUYEN, Vietnam	(Vietnam)	2011
Renzo GHIOTTI, San Marino	(San Marino)	2011
Mamadou DJERMA, Burkina Faso	(Burkina Faso)	2011
René BONOU, Burkina Faso	(Burkina Faso)	2011
Zembédé Théodore SAWADOGO, Burkina Faso	(Burkina Faso)	2011
Professor Giuseppe Rossi, San Marino	(San Marino)	2010 (posthumous)
Professor Slama Hmida, Tunisia	(Tunisia)	2009
Leticia Ferreira, Brazil	(Brazil)	2009
Phillip Chircop, Malta	(Malta)	2009
Giorgio Groppo, Italy	(Italy)	2008
Italo Accardi, Italy	(Italy)	2008
Gioseppe Enrietta, Italy	(Italy)	2008
Roy Schembri Wismayer, Malta	(Malta)	2008
David Zammit, Malta	(Malta)	2008
Andrea Tieghi, Italy	(Italy)	2008
Farid Belouafi, Morocco	(Morocco)	2008
Hadj Khadir Kadsami, Morocco	(Morocco)	2008
Abdeljalil Dahha, Morocco	(Morocco)	2008
Aziz Mochhoury, Morocco	(Morocco)	2008
José Antonio Martínez Allende, Spain	(Spain)	2008
Fernando Ganzo Hernández, Spain	(Spain)	2008
Marina Geli i Fàbrega, Spain	(Spain)	2008
Academia de Guardias y Suboficiales de la Guardia Civil, Spain	(Spain)	2008
Somâli Lamine Najeh, Tunisia	(Tunisia)	2008
Maria de Carmen Huescar Garbi, Spain	(Spain)	2007
Antonio Sepulveda Quintana, Spain	(Spain)	2007
ADONA (Association of Blood Donors of Navarra), Spain	(Spain)	2007
AUDOSAN (Association of Blood Donors of Alava), Spain	(Spain)	2007
Léon Yougbare, Burkina Faso	(Burkina Faso)	2007
Yakoub Jomni Salwa, Tunisia	(Tunisia)	2007
Gianfranco Callegari, Italy	(Italy)	2007
Domenico Comi, Italy	(Italy)	2007
Abdallah Kaabi, Tunisia	(Tunisia)	2006
Daniele Peramezza, Italy	(Italy)	2006
Vico Fresia, Italy	(Italy)	2006
José Coll, France	(France)	2004
Jean-Marie Durant, France	(France)	2004
Gérard Vanhove, France	(France)	2004
Edith Kromann Larsen, Denmark	(Denmark)	2004
Professor Radhia Kastali, Tunisia	(Tunisia)	2004
Professor Aicha Hafsia, Tunisia	(Tunisia)	2004
Dra. Maria Helena Gonçalves, Portugal	(Portugal)	2003
Professor Noufissa Benchemsi, Morocco	(Morocco)	2003
Piero Merlo, Italy	(Italy)	2003
Benito Bissolo, Italy	(Italy)	2003

== See also ==
- Blood Donation Badge of Honor
