= Friedrich von Georgi =

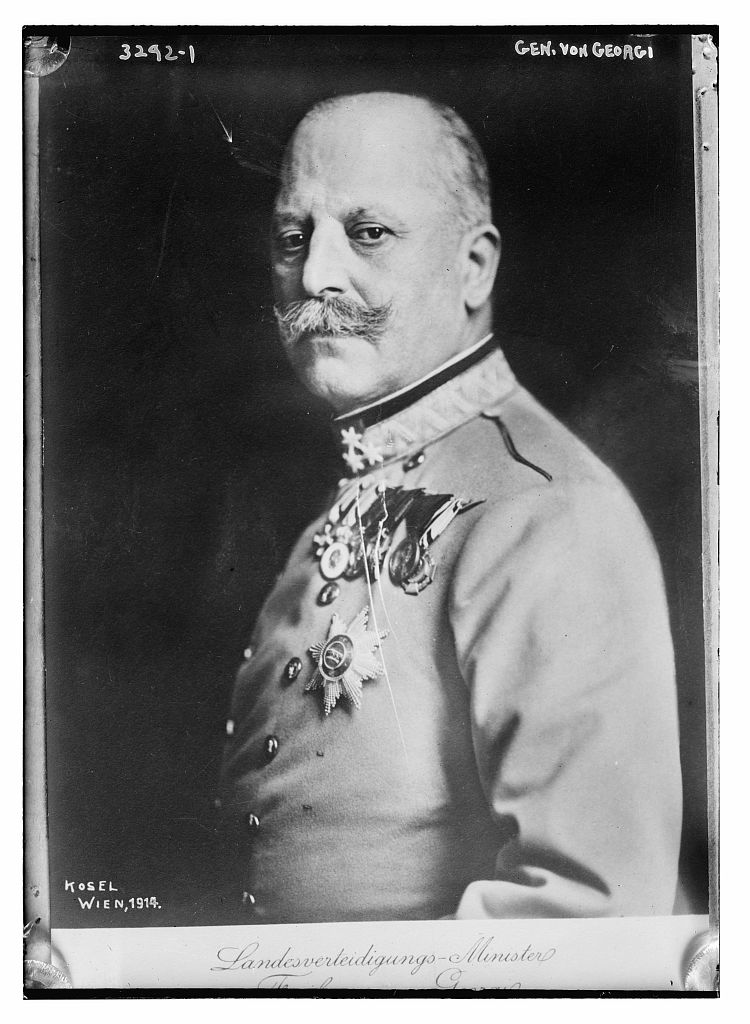

Friedrich Freiherr von Georgi (27 January 1852 – 1926) was a General of the Austro-Hungarian Army.

== Biography ==
He was born in Prague, then part of Bohemia. The son of a military Colonel, von Georgi was born into a noble family which originally came from Saxony. He attended the Theresian Cadet Academy at Hainburg. After completing his education on 1 September 1871, he was commissioned as a Lieutenant in Feldjäger Bataillon No.6.

In May 1877, von Georgi married Bertha Stamm. Together they had four children, though two of them died in infancy. From 1879 to 1881 he joined a military academy in Vienna. In 1882, von Georgi saw action in his first battle as a general staff officer of the 5th Gebirgsbrigade during a rebellion in Herzegovina. Following the campaign, he was awarded the Military Merit Medal in Bronze upon its introduction in 1890.

== Awards ==
- Military Merit Medal in Bronze (later with swords) (Austria-Hungary, 1890)
- Military Merit Cross (Austria-Hungary, October 1898)
- Order of the Iron Crown, 3rd class (Austria, January 1903) - for his services to the War Office
- Appointment to the Privy Council (4 August 1908)
- Order of the Red Eagle (Prussia, 1908)
- Order of the Iron Crown, 1st class (Austria, 9 March 1909)
- Order of St Alexander (Bulgaria, October 1912)
- Iron Cross of 1914, 1st and 2nd class (Prussia)
- Grand Cross of the Military Merit Order with swords (Bavaria, 1914)
- Grand Cross of the Order of Leopold (Austria, 12 August 1913, with associated war decoration added on 10 August 1916)
- Military Merit Cross, 1st class (Austria-Hungary, 3 February 1915)
- Decoration of Honour for Services to the Red Cross (8 March 1915)
- Military Merit Medal in Gold (25 November 1916)
- Grand Cross of the Order of the Crown with swords (Württemberg, 1916)
- Marian Cross of the Teutonic Knights (1916)
- Red Cross Medal (Prussia, 1916)
- Order of the Medjidie (Ottoman Empire, 1916)
- Grand Cross of the Albert Order with a golden star (Saxony, 1917)
- Gallipoli Star (Ottoman Empire, 1917)
- Imtiyaz Medal in Gold (Ottoman Empire, 1917)
