= German Red Cross Decoration =

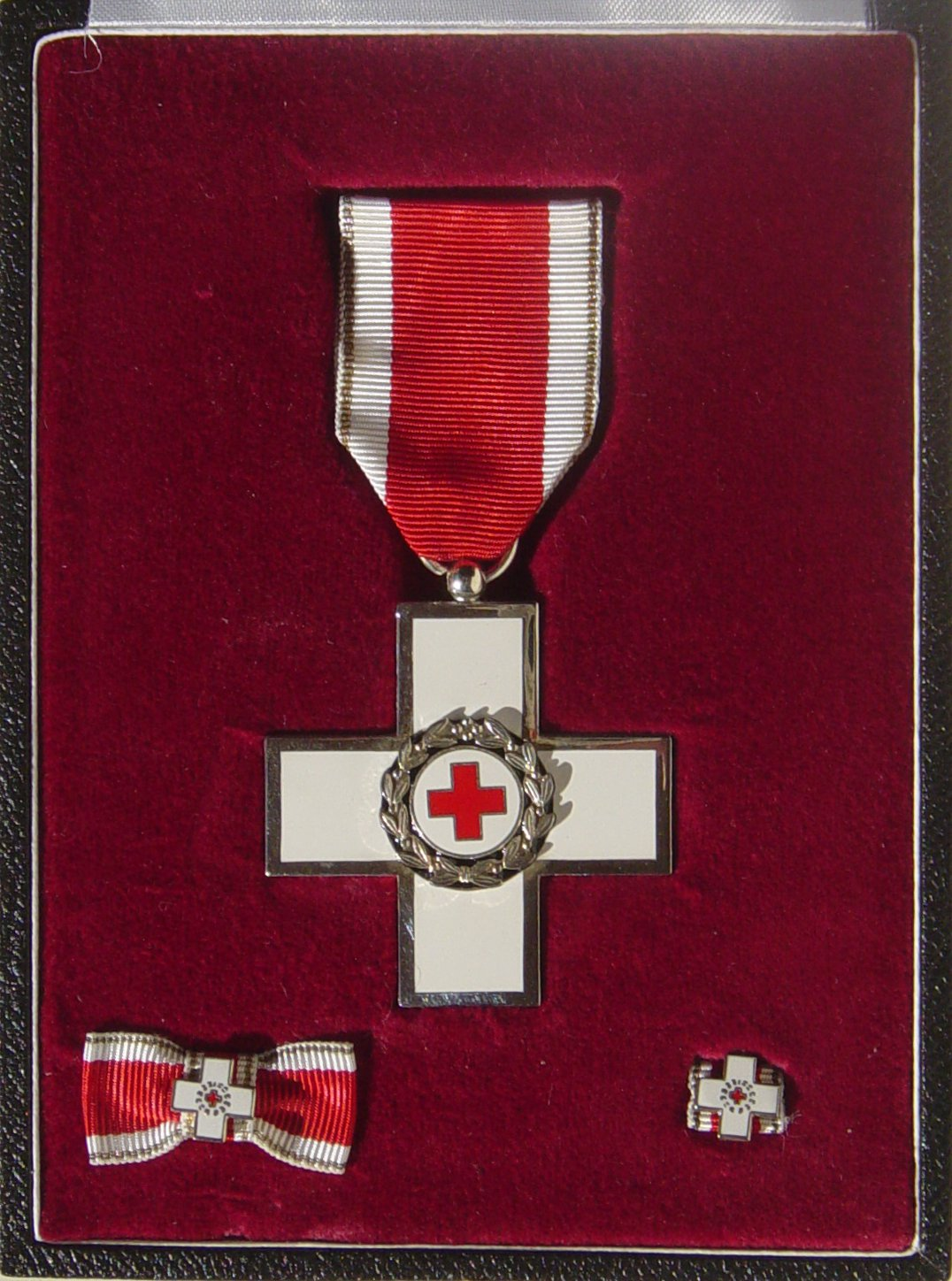
The German Red Cross Decoration (Ehrenzeichen des Deutschen Roten Kreuzes)

The German Red Cross Decoration (German: Ehrenzeichen des Deutschen Roten Kreuzes) is a decoration founded in 1922, replaced by the Social Welfare Decoration in 1939 and re-founded in its present form on 8 May 1953. It is awarded by the German Red Cross.

== Badge of Honor of the German Red Cross ==
=== Precursor ===
After the end of the First World War, according to the provisions of the Weimar Constitution (Art. 109), medals and decorations were no longer allowed to be awarded by the state.

At the German Red Cross (DRK), however, there was a particularly great need to thank mainly foreign Red Cross representatives for the reconstruction help after the World War by awarding decorations.

After intensive consultations with government agencies, the parliamentary parties in the Reichstag and bolstered by reports, the German Red Cross decided at their general meeting in May 1922 to adopt a foundation deed.

== Classes ==
The German Red Cross Decoration of Honor was founded in 1922, but was only awarded in two classes from 1924 until 1934:

- Decoration of Honor of the German Red Cross, 1st Class
- Decoration of Honor of the German Red Cross, 2nd Class

In the foundation announcement, a special level of the 1st class was planned: a special level as a breast star. The award conditions of 1924 no longer provide for this special level. From 1926, the order was under the patronage of Reich President Paul von Hindenburg.

=== 1934 ===
The classes were reorganized when, on 30 January 1934, the then President of the DRK, Carl Eduard of Saxe-Coburg and Gotha, changed the statutes with the consent of Reich President Paul von Hindenburg:

- Star of the Decoration of Honor of the German Red Cross
- Decoration of Honor of the German Red Cross, 1st Class
- Cross of Merit of the Decoration of Honor of the German Red Cross
- Red Cross Badge of Honor
- Women's Cross of the German Red Cross Decoration of Honor

=== 1937 to 1939 ===
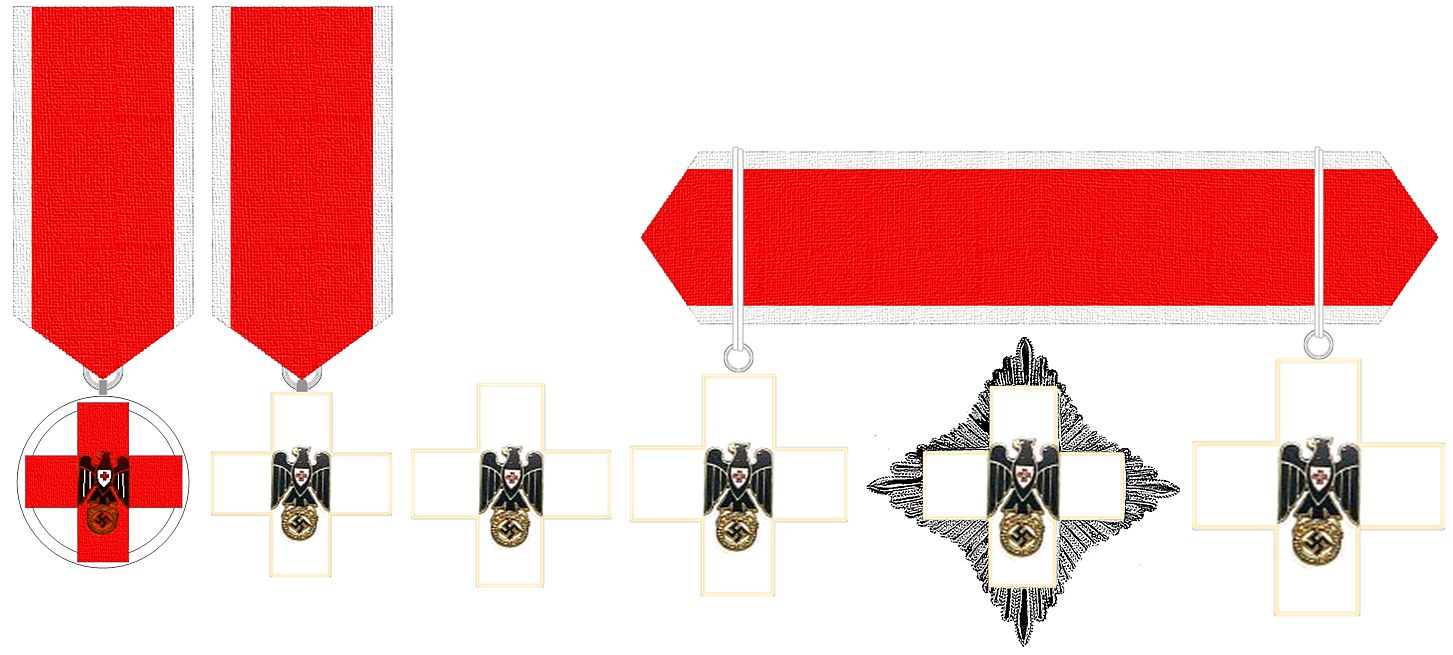
Classes 1937 to 1939

In 1937 the design was changed and, among other things, a swastika was added and the classes were reorganized:

- Grand Cross of the Decoration of Honor of the German Red Cross
- Star of the Decoration of Honor of the German Red Cross
- 1st Class of the Decoration of Honor of the German Red Cross (for distinguished service, also set with diamonds)
- Cross of Merit of the Decoration of Honor of the German Red Cross
- Women's Cross of the Decoration of Honor of the German Red Cross
- Medal of the Decoration of Honor of the German Red Cross

From 1939 onwards, the Red Cross decorations were no longer awarded and were replaced by the Decoration of Honor for German Public Care.

== See also ==
- Red Cross Medal (Prussia)
- Blood Donation Badge of Honor
