= Viriato Díaz Pérez =

Spanish-born writer and intellectual (1877-1958)

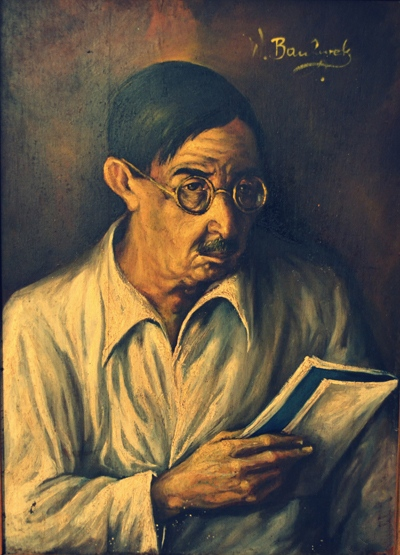

Viriato Díaz Pérez (July 6,1877 – August 25, 1958) was a Spanish-born writer and intellectual who migrated to Asunción, Paraguay. He was interested in theosophy and Eastern religions, the aesthetics of John Ruskin, the poetry of Edgar Allan Poe, Spanish-Paraguayan art and literature, and the lyrics of Gabriele D'Annunzio. His most influential work was a historiography of Paraguay, “Las comunidades peninsulares en su relación con los levantamientos comuneros americanos y en especial con la Revolución Comunera del Paraguay”.

== Early life and education ==
Viritao Díaz Pérez was born in July 1877 in Madrid. His father, Nicolás Díaz Pérez, and mother, Emilia Martín de la Herrería, were writers.

In 1900, Díaz Pérez was awarded a Doctor of Philosophy and a Doctor of Letters by the Complutense University of Madrid, where he was taught by Marcelino Menéndez y Pelayo, Francisco Giner de los Ríos, and Moraita y Cordera.

== Career in Madrid ==
From a young age, he contributed to Hispanic magazines, along with other writers of the generation of 98. Prior to his arrival in Paraguay in 1895, Díaz Pérez had already published many articles and essays on his specializations. Some of these were:

- La India
- Data about the Ancient Hindu Literature ("Nature and Function of the rhythmical language", thesis presented in the Philosophy and Letters Faculty of the University of Madrid)
- About Muslim mysticism
- Supernaturismo – Karma
- The root “an” and its meanings (Thesis presented to the Congress of Orientalists, in Amsterdam.)

In 1902, he was named Paraguayan consular general. In 1904, he published “Movimiento Intelectual en el Paraguay” (Intellectual Movement in Paraguay), which notes some of the most important personalities in Spain.

He collaborated with journalist Rafael Urbano on Sophia, a magazine reporting on theosophical movements around the world.

== Family ==
In 1906, Viritao, encouraged by the Paraguayan politician and writer Hérib Campos Cervera, who visited him in Spain, decided to travel to Paraguay. He stayed in the country and decided to settle down. He married Leticia Godoi Rivarola, daughter of the renowned politician and benefactor Juan Silvano Godoi. They had four sons, Fernán, Rodrigo, Juan Silvano and Hermán, and a daughter, Helena.

The museum and library that carry the name of Juan Silvano Godoi became the favorite refuge of Viriato, always devoted to his studies.

== Career in Paraguay ==
=== Participation in culture ===
In 1907, he organized the literary circle “La Colmena” that gathered together an entire group of first-class intellectuals, such as Rafael Barret, Juan E. O'Leary, Manuel Domínguez, Arsenio López Decoud, Modesto Guggiari, Juan Silvano Godoi, Carlos R. Centurión, Fulgencio R. Moreno, Ricardo Brugada (son), Juan Casabianca, Ignacio A. Pane, Ramón V. Caballero and others.

In 1908, he was a conspicuous collaborator at conferences in a lot of popular literary publishing at the time. Since he arrived in Paraguay, the name Viriato has never been estranged from the cultural activity in Asunción.

He participated in diverse cultural acts of international disclosure with Argentina, Brazil, Uruguay, United States, Spain, Italy and Germany. From that year to the second decade of the century, he had prodigious literary publications. He was renowned as an important part of Paraguayan intellectuality. As the Paraguayan delegate to the Congreso de Bibliografía e Hisoria (Congress of Bibliography and History) in 1916 in Buenos Aires, Argentina, he presented his work “Polibiblión Paraguayo”, a guide of bibliographic indications about Paraguay.

=== Positions occupied ===
He dedicated his life to teaching; hundreds of Paraguayans received his influence, being a professor of the Universidad Nacional de Asunción. He was appointed Chief of the National Archive and General Director of the Library and Museum of Fine Arts; additionally, he was a member of the Limits Commission with Bolivia in 1910.

== Works ==
He was editor-in-chief of the important Revista del Instituto Paraguayo.

In 1913, Viriato created the Revista Paraguaya (Paraguayan Magazine). In 1924, he wrote the official information about “La cultura y escultura en el Paraguay” (The culture and sculpture in Paraguay), presented to the League of Nations.

In 1925, Viritao collaborated with the Revista del Paraguay (Magazine of Paraguay), directed by the investigator and poet Enrique Parodi.

Viriato organized the Segundo Congreso Internacional de Historia y Geografía de América (2nd International Congress of History and Geography of America), in Asunción on October 12, 1926.

In 1930, Viriato published “La Asunción” a seminal study called “Las comunidades peninsulares en su relación con los levantamientos comuneros americanos y en especial con la Revolución Comunera del Paraguay” (The peninsular communities in their relation with the raising of the American Comuneros and especially with the Revolución in Paraguay).

In 1948, he collaborated with his monograph “La Literature en el Paraguay” (The Literature in Paraguay) to integrate the great Universal History of Literature of Prapoline, an encyclopedia of XIII volumes. Díaz Pérez was one of the most important figures in the complex time of 1900 in Paraguay.

== Death ==
On August 25, 1958, he died in Asunción.
