= Social Welfare Decoration =

German Civil Award

Social Welfare Decoration Ehrenzeichen für deutsche Volkspflege
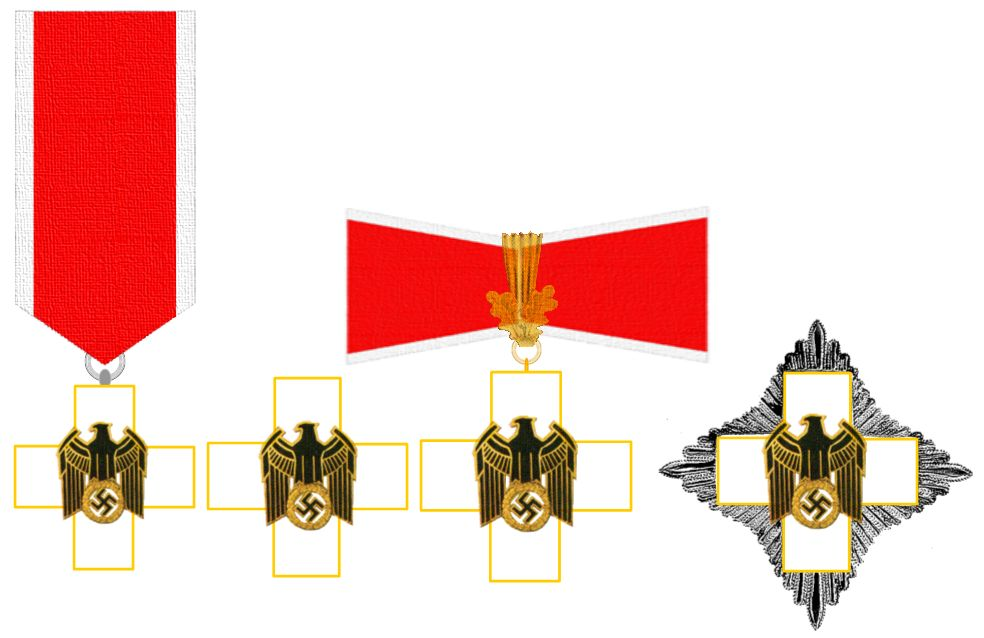
- The four classes of the decoration
- Type: Civil Award
- Awarded for: Merit in the field of welfare, Winterhilfswerk or the care of sick and wounded
- Presented by: Nazi Germany
- Status: Obsolete
- Established: 1 May 1939
- Ribbon bar

Precedence
- Equivalent: German Red Cross Decoration
- Next (lower): Medal of Social Welfare

The Social Welfare Decoration (German: Ehrenzeichen für deutsche Volkspflege) was a German Civil Award created by Adolf Hitler on 1 May 1939 for services in the social sector.

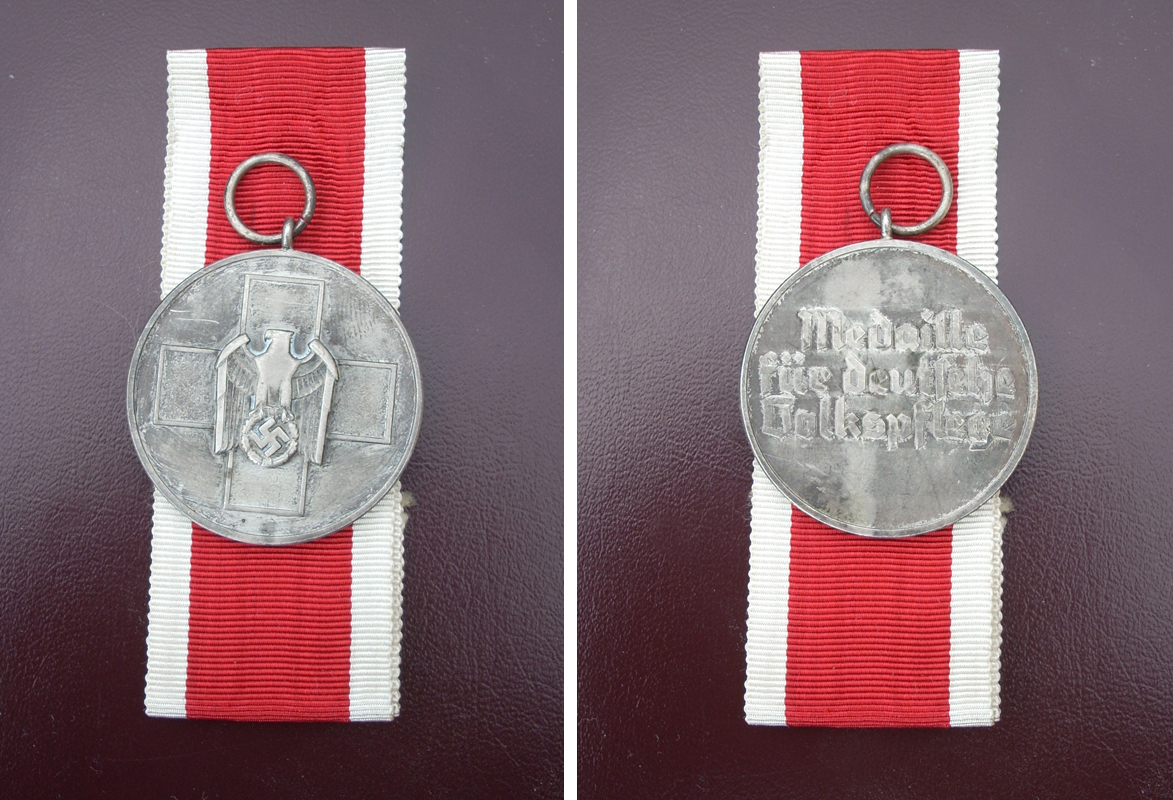
The Medaille für deutsche Volkspflege (Medal for German social welfare).

It could be awarded to Germans and foreigners for a wide variety of service to the German state in the social sector. This included service with the Winterhilfswerk, the National Socialist People's Welfare, medical and rescue work, or care of ethnic Germans. It replaced the German Red Cross Decoration.

It was conferred in four classes, each consisting of a white-enamelled gold Balkenkreuz, with the Reich eagle and swastika in the centre, and a medal:

- Special class (Sonderstufe): a four-rayed breast star with the badge worn from a sash over the right shoulder; never awarded.
- 1st class with diamonds (1. Stufe mit Brillanten): exclusively for ladies of high rank. Worn on the left shoulder from a bow; only known to have been awarded to Maria Antonescu
- 1st class (1. Stufe): a neck decoration
- 2nd class (2. Stufe): worn on the left side on a pin
- 3rd class (3. Stufe): worn on the left chest from a ribbon
- Medal of Social Welfare: a circular silver coloured medal, worn on the left chest from a ribbon. It shows an image of the cross with, on the reverse, the inscription: 'Medaille für deutsche Volkspflege' (Medal for German social welfare).

Only one grade could be worn at a time. From January 1942, the 3rd class and the medal could be awarded with crossed swords on the ribbon.

Recipients included Reinhard Heydrich who received the first class for providing "security to the German people" and Doctor Josef Mengele, in 1941, for providing medical services to the wounded on the Eastern Front.

== Post war ==
Wearing Nazi era decorations was banned after Germany's defeat in 1945. The Social Welfare Decoration was not among the World War II awards authorised for wear by the Federal Republic of Germany in 1957.
