= International Federation of Blood Donor Organizations =

International organization

- Abbreviation: IFBDO, FIODS
- Formation: December 4, 1955, Luxembourg
- Headquarters: Monaco
- Region served: Worldwide
- Members: 82 States
- Official language: English, French and Spanish
- General Secretary: Dr. Theologos Zotos Greece
- President: Dr. Abdelmalek Sayah Algeria
- Website: www.fiods-ifbdo.org

The International Federation of Blood Donor Organizations (abbreviated IFBDO in English, and FIODS in French and Spanish) is the international organization representing the voluntary, anonymous and non-remunerated blood donors.

The main stated aim of IFBDO is reaching self-sufficiency of the member states in blood and blood components from voluntary, anonymous and non-remunerated blood donors, as well as harmonization of the security standards for blood donation and inspection processes.

IFBDO has the Participatory status with the Council of Europe, and it is Registered at United Nations Department of Economic and Social Affairs (NGO Branch). IFBDO is a signee of Melbourne Declaration (2009) and Dublin Consensus (2010).

== History ==
The IFBDO was founded in Luxembourg on December 4, 1955. The Headquarters are established in Monaco.

== World Blood Donor Day ==
Since 1995 IFBDO had been organizing International Blood Donor Day as a particular initiative, but in 2002 IFBDO started negotiations with the three most important international organizations who promote blood donation: World Health Organization (WHO), the International Federation of Red Cross and Red Crescent Societies (IFRCS) and the International Society of Blood Transfusion (ISBT), as a result of which in 2004 all four organizations signed an agreement establishing the World Blood Donor Day.

At the World Health Assembly in 2005, the ministers of health of all WHO member states unanimously adopted a resolution that recognized voluntary non-remunerated blood donors as the cornerstone of a safe, adequate and sustainable blood supply. Since then World Blood Donor Day is celebrated on June 14 every year and it is sponsored by the founding partners IFBDO, WHO, IFRCS and ISBT.

== International Youth Committee ==
In 2000, IFBDO established the International Youth Committee (IYC) to promote youth volunteering for blood donation and increase youth participation in Federation activities.

At least once a year, the IYC organizes the IFBDO/FIODS International Youth Forum, an international event for all young blood donors and young volunteer associates aged between 18 and 30 years. The event is hosted on a rotation basis in one of the countries affiliated to the Federation and has an average duration of 3–4 days.

The International Youth Committee's policy is directed by the IYC Board, which is elected every three years to coincide with the Forum. The representative figures of the IYC Board are: President (currently Silvia Capodicasa, Albania), Secretary-General (currently Hichem Touahria, Algeria) and Treasurer (currently Diego Lopez Santos, Spain). The IYC Board is also composed of the Continental Delegates: Africa (currently Dounia Belouafi, Morocco), America (currently Fiorella Pacheco Rojas, Perù), Europe (currently João Pedro Junqueira, Portugal).

IFBDO Member States
Albania	Afghanistan	Algeria	Argentina	Azerbaijan	Belarus	Bolivia
Brazil	Bulgaria	Burkina Faso	Cameroon	Canada	Central African Republic	Chile
Costa Rica	(Democratic Republic of the Congo) Democratic Republic of Congo	Denmark	Djibouti	Dominica	Dominican Republic	El Salvador
Estonia	Faroe Islands	France	Gabon**	Greece	Guinea-Bissau	Guinea
Iceland	India	Indonesia	Italy	Ivory Coast	Kosovo	Latvia
Lebanon	Lithuania	Luxembourg	Mali	Malta	Morocco	Mauritius
Mexico	Monaco	Mongolia	Myanmar**	Nepal	Netherlands	Nicaragua
Niger**	Nigeria	Norway	Pakistan	Palestine	Panama	Paraguay
Peru	Philippines	Portugal	Republic of the Congo	Romania	Russia	San Marino
São Tomé and Príncipe	Senegal	Spain	Switzerland	Togo	Tunisia	Ukraine
United States of America**	Uruguay	Venezuela	Vietnam			

** Membership approved, pending ratification by General Assembly.

IFBDO Presidents
Roger Guénin (France)	1955-1958
Vittorio Formentano (Italy)	1958-1968
Louis Pauli (Monaco)	1968-1970
Roger Guénin (France)	1970-1971
Pierre Grange (France)	1971-1973
Anne Croesi (Monaco)	1974-1981
Juan Picazo (Spain)	1981-1984
Leonora Carlota Osório (Brazil)	1984-1987
Djilis Tahir (Indonesia)	1987-1988
Siti Hardiyanti Indra Rukmana (Indonesia)	1988-1995
Nicole Petton (France)	1996-1999
Martin Manceñido Fuertes (Spain)	1999- 2002
Pasquale Colamartino (Italy)	2002-2005
Niels Mikkelsen (Denmark)	2005-2011
Gianfranco Massaro (Italy)	2011-2023
Sayah Abdelmalek (Algeria)	2023-
