= Festival of the Lake =

Annual folk festival in Ypacaraí, Paraguay

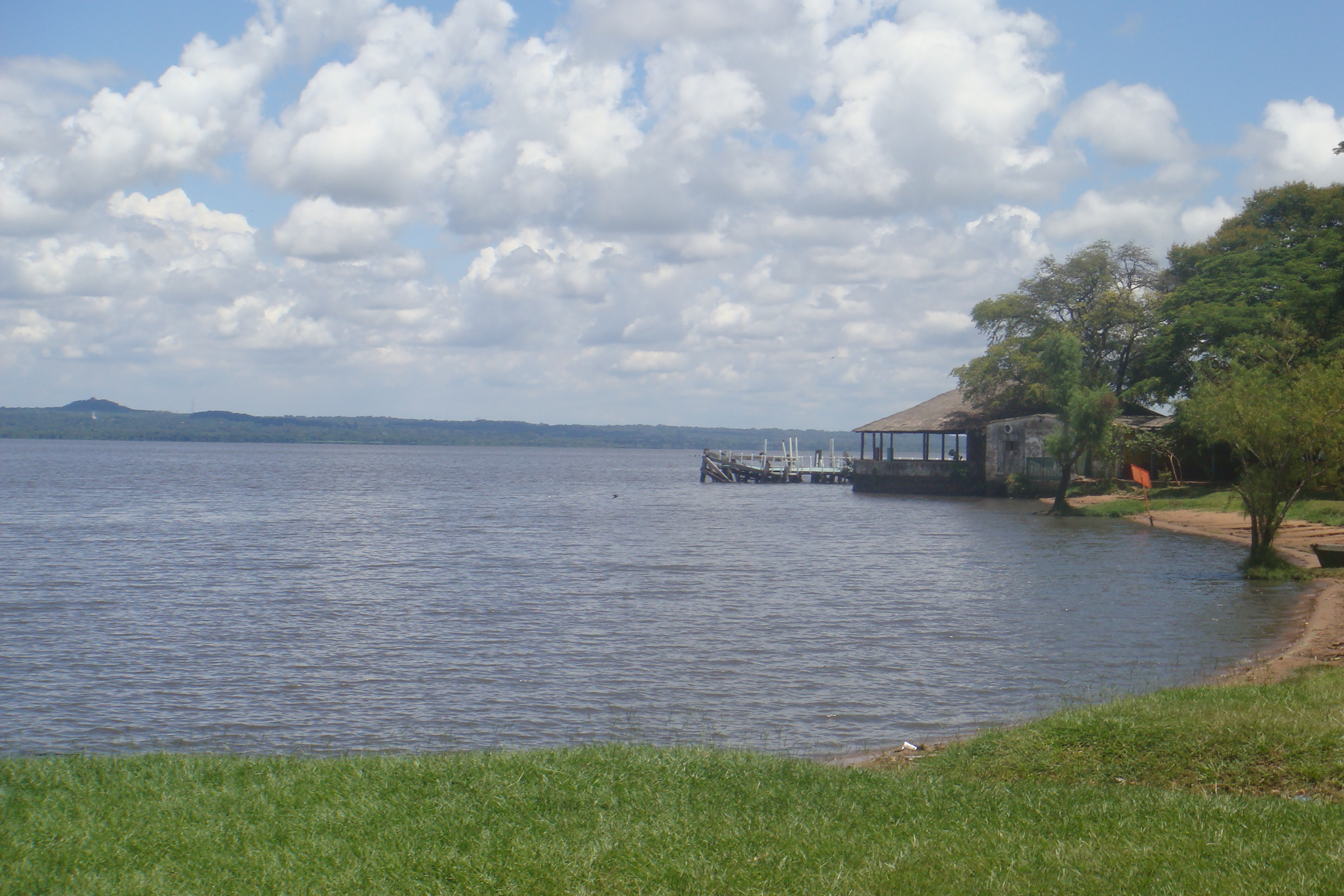
Ypacaraí Lake (2010)

The Festival of the Lake Ypacaraí (Spanish: Festival del Lago Ypacaraí), also known as the Ypacaraí Festival, is a folk festival held in the city of Ypacaraí, Paraguay.

Established in 1971, the festival is held between August and September and is organized with great emphasis on all kinds of cultural manifestations.

The purpose is to keep alive the memory of great people who have become icons in diverse artistic disciplines. Above all, it is to promote appreciation of art.

== History ==
The Festival of the Lake, as it is called, started in 1971, the initiative of a group of Ypacaraí citizens who were fond of folklore, with the purpose of celebrating the anniversary of the foundation of the district. The first festival was organized in September.

It presented a valid alternative to encourage a love of the things that were authentically national, against the new musical tendencies of foreign origin that had fast acceptance among young people.

In the first festival, the organization paid homage to Demetrio Ortiz, author of the Guarania (music genre) that is representative of the city “Recuerdos de Ypacaraí” (Memories of Ypacaraí), who in spite of the hard regimen that ruled the country in those times, could make a presence at the festival.

The first festival took place in the club “24 de Mayo”, on a small stage. The very good acceptance of the population towards the event encouraged the producers to go a step further and repeat it the following year for a greater audience and with many more national talents.

== Stages of the festival ==
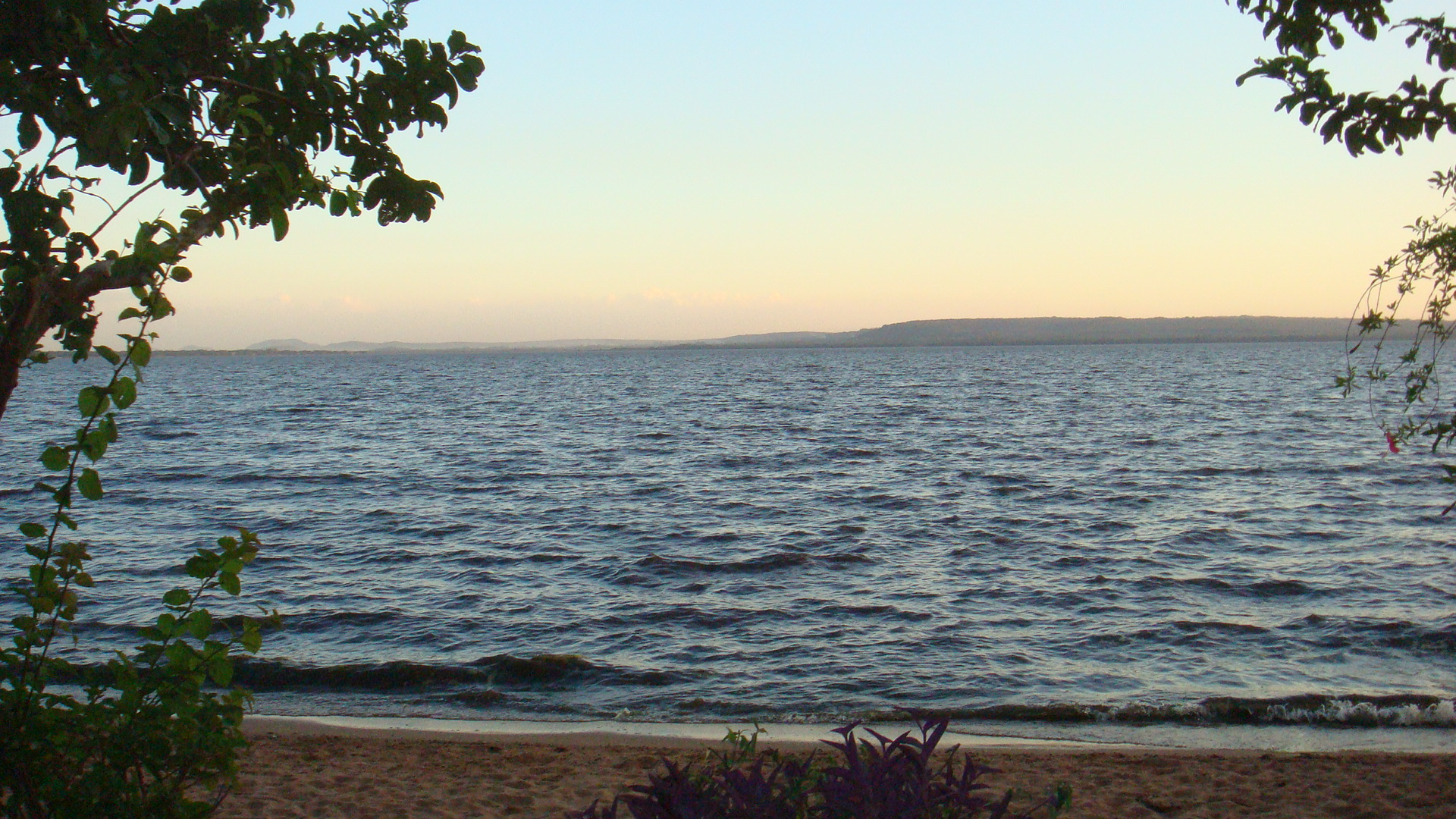
Ypacaraí Lake (2010)

The festival has come through two stages.

In the first stage, the festival was all about maintaining the traditional values of the cultural expressions of the country through the dance, poetry and craftsmanship, reaching its culminating point in the 1980s.

The second stage started when the organization decided to assume also a defense of human rights, which they considered were not being respected by the current government of President General Stroessner. This resulted in the festival being prohibited in 1986, by a resolution of the Department of the Interior.

However, the people of Ypacaraí did not abandon hope of continuing this activity. They took courage and received the support of the entire country and the festival moved to the property of the parish church, all with police custody.

In 1989, with the overthrow of the dictatorial government and the arriving of democracy, the festival was reborn with much more expectation.

== Festival with international presence ==
Since its first years, the festival had a fluent exchange with other international festivals, similar in their objectives of making known and gives importance to the culture of the country.

Delegations from this festival participated in Argentina's festivals of Santa Fe, Córdoba, the Folklore National Festival of Pirané, in Chile in the Folklore Festival of Yacuiba, and also in Brazil and Bolivia.

The delegations from other countries also came to the festival of the Lago Ypacaraí.

== International exposure or participation ==
Since 1973, other international groups joined the festival, they were Los del Suquia, from Argentina, Los Carabajal, Los Cantores del Alba, La Compañía Argentina de Danza, Teresa Parodi and many others.

From Brazil participated groups such as: Ballet Primitivo del Arte Negro from the state of Pernambuco, Xaxado, from Paraíba. From Peru came the group of ballet Peru Negro, Aukamaru, Roberto Parra and many others. Mexico was present too with the Mariachi Los Pasajeros, Mariachi Nacional of Mexico among others.

Other groups of artists from Uruguay, Chile and Bolivia also have participated in the festival. The list would be too long to name all the people. The festival did not stick only to the musical; from it was born the first municipal school of ballet, which allowed the diffusion of this art, and with time, other artistic manifestations also added to this festival.

== Awards ==
In 1976, it was instituted the trophy “Recuerdos de Ypacaraí” (Memories of Ypacaraí), which was granted by a specially selected jury in every edition of the festival, it was national and international.

Nowadays it can be said that the Festival of Lago Ypacaraí is the most famous in Paraguay, of all the Latin American Folklore festivals.

== Homage people in the festival ==
The following is a list of people that have been honored in the different editions of the festival, with the passing of time, the organization added more categories such as folkloric dancing and local craftsmanship.

In 2006, homage was made to Renée Ferrer in the festival of poetry for the second time. In 2001, the organizing commission decided to include among the list of homage the people the artisans too.

== Festival of Lago Ypacaraí ==
- 1971, Demetrio Ortiz
- 1972, Félix de Ypacaraí / María Cristina Gómez Rabito
- 1973, Alberto de Luque
- 1974, Diosnel Chase
- 1975, Luís A. del Paraná
- 1976, Teófilo Escobar
- 1977, Agustín Barboza
- 1978, Mujer paraguaya compañera del artista
- 1979, Florentín Giménez
- 1980, Eladio Martínez
- 1981, Mauricio Cardozo Ocampo
- 1982, Félix Fernández
- 1983, Darío Gómez Serrato
- 1984, Teodoro S. Mongelós
- 1985, Músicos de la Epopeya del Chaco
- 1986, 1987 y 1988, PROHIBIDO
- 1989, Maneco Galeano
- 1990, Augusto Roa Bastos
- 1991, Dúo Quintana-Escalante
- 1992, Alejandro Cubilla
- 1993, Juan Alfonso Ramírez y los Indios
- 1994, José Magno Soler
- 1995, Zulema de Mirkin
- 1996, Vocal Dos
- 1997, El pueblo
- 1998, Rigoberto Arévalo
- 1999, Los hermanos González
- 2000, Juan Cancio Barreto
- 2001, Efrén Echeverría
- 2002, Carlos Federico Abente
- 2003, Carlos Niz
- 2004, Neneco Norton
- 2005, Ricardo Flecha
- 2006, Epifanio Méndez Fleitas
- 2007, Oscar Safuán

== Festival of Poetry ==
- 1990, Elvio Romero
- 1991, María Luisa Artecona de Thompson
- 1992, Félix de Guarania
- 1993, Renée Ferrer de Arréllaga
- 1994, Gladys Carmagnola
- 1995, Luis María Martínez
- 1996, Ramiro Domínguez
- 1997, José Luis Appleyard
- 1998, Elsa Wiezell
- 1999, Oscar Ferreiro
- 2000, Teresa Servián de Sosa
- 2001, Pedro Encina Ramos
- 2002, Ramón Silva
- 2003, Mercedes Jané
- 2004, Aurelio González Canale
- 2005, Rubén Bareiro Saguier
- 2006, Renée Ferrer de Arréllaga
- 2007, Mario Rubén Álvarez

== Festival of Theater ==
- 1982, José Arturo Alsina
- 1983, Máxima Lugo
- 1984, José L. Melgarejo
- 1985, Josefina Plá
- 1989, Alcibiades González Delvalle
- 1990, Ernesto Báez
- 1991, Sin datos precisos
- 1992, Rudi Torga
- 1993, Tito Chamorro
- 1994, Pedro Moliniers
- 1995, Sara Giménez
- 1996, Erenia López
- 1997, María Helena Sachero
- 1998, Edith Errecartes
- 1999, César Álvarez Blanco y Rafael Rojas Doria (Los Compadres)
- 2000, Jesús Pérez
- 2001, Victoria Figueredo
- 2002, Nizugan
- 2003, Mercedes Jané
- 2004, Luís D’Oliveira
- 2005, Humberto Gulino
- 2006, Jorge Ramos
- 2007, Compañía Roque Sánchez-Graciela Pastor

== Festival of Dancing ==
- 1990, Celia Ruiz de Domínguez y Gilda Ruiz de Segovia
- 1991, María Magdalena Duarte Melgarejo y Emilio Barrientos
- 1992, Petronita Vinader
- 1993, María Balbina Vera
- 1994, Rosa Vera de Barúa y Dora Rabito de Sosa
- 1995, Lilian Garicoche
- 1996, Elizabeth Vinader
- 1997, Mercedes Vera
- 1998, Sussy Sacco
- 1999, Mirtha Cabañas de Bonzi
- 2000, Pamela Fretes
- 2001, Cándido Duarte y Gladys Lenguaza
- 2002, Reina Cáceres
- 2003, Natalia Ramos y Felicita Patiño de Márquez
- 2004, Mirta Lenguaza
- 2005, Katy Ortega
- 2006, Beatriz Frutos
- 2007, Zully Vinader

== Festival of Craftsmanship ==
- 2001, Marcial Medina
- 2002, Indalecio Chávez y Del Rosario Sanabria
- 2003, Rosa Brítez
- 2004, Federico Giménez
- 2005, Benjamín Patiño y Serafín Montanía
- 2006, Alejandrino García
- 2007, Ramón Ayala Salim

== See also ==
- List of festivals in Paraguay
- List of folk festivals
