= List of Paraguayan women writers =

This is a list of women writers who were born in Paraguay or whose writings are closely associated with that country.

- Dora Acuña (1903–1987), poet, journalist, radio presenter
- María Luisa Artecona de Thompson, (1937–2003), writer particularly for children
- Chiquita Barreto (born 1947) novelist and academic
- Gladys Carmagnola (1939–2015), acclaimed poet, wrote for adults and children
- Raquel Chaves (born 1939), poet, journalist, educator
- Susy Delgado (born 1949), poet, writes in Spanish and Guarani
- Renée Ferrer de Arréllaga (born 1944), poet, novelist
- Josefina Pla (1903–1999), Spanish-born Paraguayan poet, playwright, critic, journalist
- Mercedes Sandoval de Hempel (1919–2005), lawyer, feminist, legal writings
- Carmen Soler (1924–1985), poet, educator, moved to Argentina
- Elsa Wiezell (1926–2014), poet, teacher, artist
- Faith Wilding (born 1943), Paraguayan-American feminist artist, non-fiction writer, educator

== See also ==
- List of women writers
- List of Spanish-language authors
