= Gladys Carmagnola =

Paraguayan poet and teacher

Gladys Carmagnola de Medina
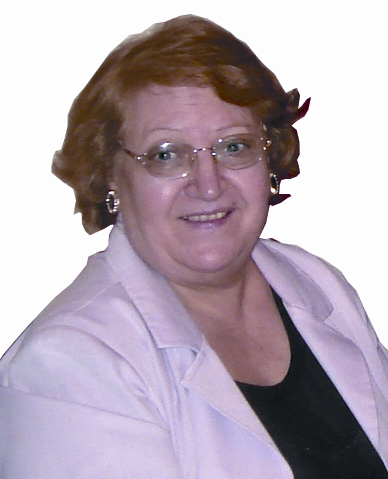
- Gladys Carmagnola
- Born: January 2, 1939; Guarambaré, Paraguay
- Died: July 9, 2015 (aged 76)
- Known for: Poet
- Notable work: Ceniza y llamarada – Para reconocernos como hermanos
- Awards: José María Heredia Poetry Award of the Miami Art Critics Association

Gladys Carmagnola (January 2, 1939 – July 9, 2015) was a Paraguayan poet and teacher. Her work is devoted to a wide audience, including works for children and adults.

== Early life ==
Carmagnola was born in Guarambaré on January 2, 1939, daughter of Ramona and Carlos Herrera Udrizar Carmagnola, a descendant of Italians. She shared her childhood with her brothers Carlos, the eldest, Haydee and Selva. As early as adolescence she showed a natural inclination towards poetry. From a very early age she was devoted to teaching, and simultaneously developing her poetic vocation.

== Career ==
She is co-founder and member of the Society of Writers of Paraguay. She also had involvement in the founding of the group of Paraguayan Associated Writers and the Pen Club of Paraguay.

She is part of a generation of Paraguayan women who, early in the decade of the 1960s, made their literary production, occupying a very important area in the Paraguayan literature.

Her first steps in producing poetry, were directed towards children. Her first book of poems for children was called "Ojitos negros", published in April 1965.

In addition to her many books published, several of her poems have been included in anthologies and literary publications, both in her country and other foreign nations.

Carmagnola is a writer from the group of contemporary writers that marked a new trend in the literature of Paraguay. Among them are: Eloy Fariña Núñez, Hérib Campos Cervera, Josefina Plá, Óscar Ferreiro, Elvio Romero, José Luis Appleyard, Ramiro Domínguez, José María Gómez Sanjurjo, Rubén Bareiro Saguier, Carlos Villagra Marsal, Jacobo Rauskin, Miguel Ángel Fernandez, Roque Vallejos, Emilio Pérez Chaves, Susy Delgado, and Mario Casartelli.

== Poetic style ==
About her predilection for poetry for children, this author has pointed out: "… writing for children is my great commitment and my singular pride, as well."

In 1979, Mrs. Josefina Plá responded Carmagnola children's works: "There is tenderness in the book, a lot of tenderness, too if you do not know Gladys and do not know that she is pure tenderness; that sweetness is her accent and her images of saccharin is not true but honey cookbook interlinings heart. "

Her poems for children have a gentle and engaging style, evoking a sense of delight and nostalgia, and often recalling experiences such as ice cream, daytime naps, and playtime with friends.

It has also been echoed her work "Piolin", the Argentine author Maria Elena Walsh, who defined it as "transparent Piolin", for its literary beauty and clarity.

Since 1980, emerges a stage of maturity as a writer, moving their production toward a modern style. They emerge at this stage, poems that reflect an era intimately reflective of the poet and several poems of nature amatory.

Her work for adults rose in a language that is clear and transparent that feels like a breath of fresh air for readers.

== Family ==
She married Julio Medina, a lawyer by profession. They had one daughter: Cecilia Medina Carmagnola.

== Works ==
Her first publication dates back to 1965, since then, she has been devoted entirely to the production of poetic works, completing a total of 20 titles.

Year	Works of poetry for children
1965	Ojitos Negros
1966	Navidad
1979	Piolin. Work child in its first edition was presented by Josefina Plá.
2003	Moons flour. Walk – When zoo – Logical! (Walk to the zoo).

Year	works of poetry for adults
1982	Lazo essential.
1984	A weathertight. Work in which gathers some of his early poems beginning of the 60 '
1989	As in the capueras. Distinguished with the Poetry Award "Jose Maria Heredia" of the Association of Art Critics of Miami, US.
1992	Depository infidel. Poemario winner of the (single) Poetry of the Paraguayan-German Cultural Institute
1997	Territorio Esmeralda.
2002	And former White River.

Year	Books unpublished
1986	To recognize us as brothers. Work finalist in the poetry contest of the Ateneo de Casablanca Cordova Spain.
1990	Ash and flash. Work that won the contest in accésit Quinto Centenario summoned by the Spanish Embassy in Paraguay.

== Awards and honors ==
Throughout her career she has been honored with numerous awards and tributes nationally and internationally.

Year	Awards
1981	First Prize of Poetry "Friends of Art" (Asunción)
1985	Poetry Prize "Jose Maria Heredia" of the Association of Art Critics of Miami, USA for his work "Like in capueras"
1989	Award "Silver Fiambrera" of the Ateneo of Popular Culture Cordova (Spain)
1992	Award (single) Poetry of the Paraguayan-German Cultural Institute for his work "Depository infidel."
1994	Platelets and Public Tribute Festival Lake Ypacaraí
1995	Mention honor of National Prize for Literature
1996	Municipal Prize for Literature

== Sources ==
- Virtual Word
