= José Luis Appleyard =

Paraguayan poet

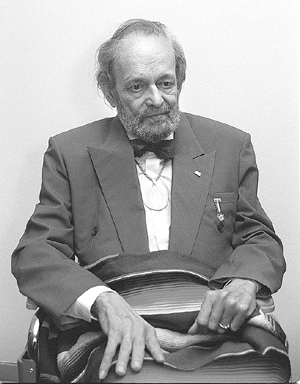

Background information
- Born: José Luis Appleyard; May 5, 1927; Asunción, Paraguay
- Died: 1998, (aged 70) Asunción, Paraguay
- Genre: 50
- Occupation: Poet

José Luis Appleyard (5 May 1927 – 1998) was a Paraguayan poet, playwright, lawyer, journalist and publisher.

== Childhood and youth ==
Appleyard was born in May, 1927, in Asunción, the capital city of Paraguay.

Appleyard completed his primary school education at Escuela Normal de Profesores school. He started high school at the Colegio de San José de Asunción and later transferred to Colegio San Martín in Buenos Aires, Argentina where he graduated.

Appleyard studied law at Universidad Nacional de Asunción and after graduating, he went on to work as a poet lawyer for approximately ten years. He would go on to have a prolific career in journalism and poetry.

== First steps ==
Appleyard was one of the favorite disciples of César Alonso de las Heras, a priest in Colegio de San José. Father Alonso is a fundamental figure regarding the diffusion of Spanish poetry of what are called the '98 and '27 generations. He was also the mentor of numerous talented poets and writers, first from the Academia Literaria del Colegio de San José, and then from the Academia Universitaria, being president and active referent of this last.

Appleyard was part of the so-called "fifties generation" in Paraguayan poetry, along with other notable figures José María Gómez Sanjurjo, Ricardo Mazó and Ramiro Domínguez.

For almost two decades, Appleyard worked as a journalist for La Tribuna, a newspaper in Asunción. He was also "Boss of the Culture Area" and director of the cultural supplement published on Sundays. He was the editor of "Monólogos", an important column which influenced people and achieved great popularity by writing about subjects of interest at the time, such as "how people speak in Paraguay". Likewise, he worked in Ultima Hora, the newspaper where his column, "Desde el tiempo que vivo", was one of the most anticipated by the thousands of readers.

Appleyard was invited to many countries, such as the United States of America and Germany, and he visited numerous nations in which he gave conferences, and presented his poems.

== Trajectory ==
Appleyard was President of the PEN Club del Paraguay and served as the secretary of Academia Paraguaya de la Lengua Española.

The poet and literary critic Roque Vallejos wrote in the epilogue of his book, "José-Luis Appleyard - Antología poética", which was published in 1996: "...He has poems of notable social sarcasm that Rafael Barrett would have wanted to include in his "Moralidades actuales". So as in his poem "Hay un sitio" que that states in one of its fragments: There are synonyms clear, translucent: / being free is growing without will / to steal is to rob, love is hate, / and to live is to die defenceless / loneliness is called company/ and betraying is to be loyal to your friends. / The news are old. All that's new/ has a dark old shining. Discreetly and with no violence, Appleyard faithfully and severely describes the state of spiritual and semantic emptiness of the words and the trapped feeling that the dictatorship carried within for more than thirty years. A poet that has based all his pieces on freedom couldn't - nor has tried to do so - defend a dogmatic moral that would have fatally led him to "mere materialist doctrinism".

Hugo Rodríguez-Alcalá, a Paraguayan literature investigator, wrote in his book "Appleyard da a la estampa"... the best in his promotion:... Amongst those of the Academia Universitaria, Appleyard is the one who best fulfills the following subjects: the longing for lost times, the teen love, and the magic of childhood. All these subjects are mentioned in "Entonces era siempre", an anthology of poems in which the poet reviews childhood".

== Style ==
Appleyard himself, in a brief script of June 1981 that introduces his book "Tomado de la mano", expresses the following in relation to his poems:

And this is how, grabbing hands with them, I have found myself in a long journey of years, days and hours that have granted me a bit of everything. In this path expressed in my verses I have felt sad and happy, I have felt overwhelmed by loneliness and yet more by company. I have seen myself as a child in Areguá. I have seen myself as a young student in Buenos Aires. I have felt as if I were in Academia Universitaria again feeling that beautiful rush that a group of friends generates. And I have also seen myself, with white hair, white bearb, just as I am today". And he adds: "The eyes of those who read me won't see what I see . But they might build the image of a road in which edges life is found. If this is so, my verses would have had accomplished their mission of leaving my voice within these pages. If not, these poems will always be my sons that in most cases were born in painful desperation, sons of mine that were left defenceless, alone and defenceless of the one that gave them life through a poem. They remain with the reader, lost and lonely, those poems. Let them say if they have it… their truth.

== Distinctions ==
In 1961, Appleyard won the Municipal Award of Theater with the poetic drama about the Paraguayan independence, "Aquel 1811".

In 1997, he received Paraguay's National Prize for Literature for his book Cenizas de la vida.

== Last years ==
Appleyard died in Asunción in 1998.

== Works ==
Even though Appleyard has written many other brief pieces, most of his theatrical production remains unedited.

Year	Pieces
1953	"Poesía", junto a otros miembros de la Academia Universitaria.
1963	El poemario "Entonces era siempre", su primer libro (1963).
1965	"El sauce permanece" (1965),
1978	"Así es mi Nochebuena".
1981	book featuring the poem "Cigarra, tonta cigarra", magnificently musicalizad by Maneco Galeano, "Tomado de la mano".
1982	"El labio y la palabra".
1983	"Solamente los años.
1965	En narrativa es autor de una novela: "Imágenes sin tierra"
1971	"Los monólogos"
1983	"La voz que nos hablamos"

Year	last publications
1988	"Las palabras secretas", un poemario.
1993	"Desde el tiempo que vivo", a series of sixty short poems regarding the most important events of the second millennium of the Christian era, book that attributed the award Premio Municipal de Literatura in 1994
1997	For his last book, Cenizas de la vida, he was awarded with the highest in Paraguayan literature paraguayas, Premio Nacional de Literatura that the Parlamento Paraguayo trusted to him the same year.
