= World Friendship Crusade =

International civil organization

World Friendship Crusade is an international civil organization that campaigns in favor of friendship as a way of fostering a culture of peace. Founded by Dr. Ramón Artemio Bracho in Puerto Pinasco, Paraguay in 1958, the World Friendship Crusade celebrates Friendship Day every July 30.

== World Friendship Crusade in Origin and Mission ==
On July 20, 1958, while out to dinner with friends in the town of Puerto Pinasco, Paraguay, Dr. Ramón Artemio Bracho proposed the idea of a World Friendship Day to his colleagues. On that night, the World Crusade of Friendship was founded, as an activist organization that would promote the idea of celebrating worldwide friendship on July 30. The organization lobbied the United Nations for many years, until finally, on July 27, 2011, the General Assembly of the United Nations assigned this date to celebrate the International Friendship Day.

== Friendship Day Traditions ==
"Día de la Amistad" is celebrated every July 30 in Paraguay, where it is a popular festivity in which it is custom among Paraguayans to salute and wish each other's happiness throughout the day, while also exchanging presents.

Another classic activity during this celebration, particularly among young students, but also among other general groups (coworkers, companies, civil organizations, etc.), is the game of the "invisible friend", which is a variation of the popular Secret Santa. One week before the celebration, participants are invited to write their names on a piece of paper and then, after scrambling all these pieces in a basket or container, retrieve one of the names, without revealing it to the others. Participants then become the "invisible friend" of the person on that piece of paper, and during the week before the celebration, they are invited to write anonymous small notes or letters to the person whose name they selected. On the day of the celebration, invisible friends bring presents to their friends, and one after the other, reveal their identities before giving their presents.

== See also ==
- Friendship Day
- Pacifism
