= César Alonso de las Heras =

- Born: César Alonso de las Heras; December 24, 1913; Villaralbo, Zamora, Spain
- Died: September 3, 2004 (aged 90); Asunción, Paraguay

César Alonso de las Heras (1913–2004) was a Spanish priest, teacher, and poet active for much of his life in Paraguay. He moved to Asunción in 1940 to teach literature at the Colegio de San José, serving as its principal between 1953 and 1959.

At the Colegio, Father Alonso de las Heras mentored Paraguayan writers including Ricardo Mazó, José Luis Appleyard, and José María Gómez Sanjurjo.

== Legacy ==
The Diary of Father César Alonso de las Heras during the Civil War of 1947 was published in October 2025 by Línea de Tiempo.
