= National Prize for Literature (Paraguay) =

- Sponsored by: Ministry of Education and Science
- Date: 1991
- Country: Paraguay

The National Prize for Literature (Premio Nacional de Literatura) is awarded biennially, in odd-numbered years, by the Ministry of Education and Science, to "books in the genres of poetry, narrative, essay, or theater, written in Spanish or Guaraní, by Paraguayan or foreign authors with at least five years of residence in Paraguay." It was established in 1990 by Law No. 97/90, which also created the National Prize for Science, awarded in even-numbered years. This was updated by Law No. 1149 in 1997.

Its jury is composed of "five people of recognized experience, suitability, and prestige in literature".

Winners receive a sum equivalent to 50 times the monthly minimum wage. As of 2021, this was ₲114,466,200 (US$16,897).

== List of winners ==
- 1991: Elvio Romero
- 1993: (not awarded)
- 1995: Augusto Roa Bastos
- 1997: José Luis Appleyard
- 1999: Hugo Rodríguez-Alcalá
- 2001: Mario Halley Mora
- 2003: Carlos Martínez Gamba
- 2005: Rubén Bareiro Saguier
- 2007: Jacobo Rauskin
- 2009: Ramiro Domínguez
- 2011: Renée Ferrer de Arréllaga
- 2013: Alcibiades González Delvalle
- 2015: Maybell Lebron
- 2017: Susy Delgado
- 2019: Maribel Barreto
- 2021: Susana Gertopán
- 2023: Moncho Azuaga
- 2025: Gustavo Laterza
