= Eduardo Bähr =

Honduran writer(1940–2023)

- Born: September 23, 1940; Tela, Honduras
- Died: August 4, 2023 (aged 82); Morazán, Honduras

Eduardo Bähr (23 September 1940 – 4 August 2023) was a Honduran writer, scriptwriter and actor. In 1996, along with Mexico's Octavio Paz, Spain's Rafael Alberti, and Nicaragua's Ernesto Cardenal, he was one of the 50 intellectuals awarded the Gabriela Mistral Medal by the government of Chile. For many years, he taught Honduran and Latin-American Literature at the National University of Honduras, where he also directed the University Theater Company.

Segments of his novel El cuento de la guerra (The War Story) have been translated into English, French and German. The book's theme is the armed conflict between Honduras and El Salvador in 1969.

Bähr was a member of "Artistas de la Gente", a collective of five artists of different generations and disciplines who develop critical political art.

He lived in Tegucigalpa, where he ran a non-profit editorial service to promote publication among low-income Honduran and Central American artists and students. He died in 2023, aged 82 years.

== Bibliography ==
- 1969, Fotografía del Peñasco (short stories).
- 1971, El Cuento de la Guerra; excerpt (in German) Pichardos Sohn. Transl. José Antonio Friedl Zapata. In: Ein neuer Name, ein fremdes Gesicht. 26 Erzählungen aus Lateinamerika. Sammlung Luchterhand, 834. Neuwied, 1987, 1989, pp 69–79.
- 1999. "La Flora Maga". en Línea de Fuga, N°5, enero-marzo, México. y 1997–1998, "La Flora Maga" en L'ordinaire Latino-américain, N° 176, IPEALT, Toulouse, France.
- 2002, "Fondo de Reptiles", en Honduras: Prensa, Poder y Democracia, CEDOH, Tegucigalpa.
- 2003, El niño de la montaña de la Flor, Traducido al catalán por la Editorial Vilatana, España.

Popular education brochures: El Cabildo Abierto, Participación y Control Ciudadanos, Transparencia y Corrupción, La Sociedad Civil en Honduras, Democracia y Medios de Comunicación en Honduras, La Reforma Política de los Políticos, La Mentira Política de los Políticos, El pobre mundo de la pobrería.

Anthologies and translations

- 2006. Antología del Cuento Latinoamericano. Olver Gilberto de León / Rubén Bareiro-Saguier. Grupo La Gotera - Ediciones Espacio, Montevideo, 2006, 268, páginas.
- 2003, "Los Héroes de la fiebre" en Enríque Jaramillo Levi (comp.) Pequeñas Resistencias 2. Antología del Cuento Centroamericano Contemporáneo, VV.AA. Editorial: Editorial Páginas de Espuma, Colección Voces, volumen 32, Madrid.
- 1988, "The Fever Heroes" in Barbara Paschke and David Volpendesta, Clamor of Innocence: Stories from Central America (City Lights)
- 1994, Tarzan of the Apes, Contemporary short stories from Central America / edited by Enrique Jaramillo Levi and Leland H. Chambers; translations coordinated by Leland H. Chambers; translated by Lynne Beyer ... [et al.]. University of Texas Press.
- 1982, La alcachofa es un caso de silogismo, in Liść wiatru : antologia opowiadań Ameryki Środkowej / wybrał, oprac. i posłowiem opatrzył Jerzy Kühn; [przeł. [z hisz.] Jerzy Brzozowski i in.]. - Kraków[Polska] : Wydawnictwo Literackie, 1982
- 1981. "Je serais incapable de vous jeter une pierre", in Anthologie de la Nouvelle Hispano-américaine, Olver Gilberto De León / Rubén Bareiro-Saguier, Editions Belfond, Paris, 1981, 284 p. (Portuguese edition in 1983)

== Cinema ==
- "The Scattered Body and The World Upside Down" / Utopia, TV, Germany. Directed by Raúl Ruiz. 1975; (in German) Mensch verstreut und Welt verkehrt. 1976
- No hay tierra sin dueño, Honduras, Director Sami Kafati. 2001
- El viaje de Suyapa, Honduras, Director Katia Lara. 2007
