= Rolando Chaparro =

Paraguayan musician (born 1965)

- Born: Rolando Chaparro Benítez; August 2, 1965; Asunción, Paraguay
- Known for: Musician, Composer, Guitarist
- Notable work: Polcarera de los lobos (1989, Un misil en mi ventana (1991)
- Website: www.rolandochaparro.com

Rolando Chaparro (born August 2, 1965) is a Paraguayan musician.

== Early life ==
Chaparro was born on August 2, 1965 in Asunción. He is son of Rolando Chaparro (professional photographer) and Celia María Benítez (actress). He was very interested in music since an early age and at the age of 9 he made of the guitar his main instrument. He studied with Kuki Rey and initiated in the jazz studying by 4 years with Carlos Schvartzman. He formed later with Carlos Schvartzman, Remigio Pereira and Mario Rodríguez an experimental musical quartet with jazzy tendencies.

== Career ==
In 1984 he grouped with Berta Rojas and Carlos Noguera.

in 1985 he joined to “Síntesis” (Synthesis), a jazz-fusion and folkloric projection group, performing in many places of Asunción.

Between 1987 and 1991 worked with Ñamandu (the duet of Alejandrino “Chondi” Paredes and Ricardo Flecha), forming a folkloric tendency trio, touring and recording in many Latin American countries.

In 1991 joined back to Síntesis, this time with new people. Parallelly, he also joined the jazz-fusion and folkloric projection band of the saxophonist William "Palito" Miranda, performing in the international festivals of Posadas, Argentina; Viña del Mar, Chile and São Paulo, Brazil.

In May 1994 he performed with Síntesis in the Memorial of Latin America of São Paulo and in Buenos Aires. Later that year he definitively left Síntesis to form a new band “Krhizya”, with rock tendency.

With Krhizya he records an album in which could be found a classic in the Paraguayan folkloric music, "Reservista Purahéi", but in a blues version, something never done before. This way, Rolando Chaparro marked a hit referring to rock covers of Paraguayan folkloric music.

As a composer he's one of the most outstanding. His production is of about a thousand pieces including jazz-fusion, folkloric projection, music for theater plays, commercial jingles, music for TV shows, among others.

He also developed soloist projects, like “Guitarreros”, with Efrén Echeverría, Juan Cancio Barreto and Barni Chaparro, performing in various theaters of Paraguay.

He played in a concert with the harpist César Cataldo, obtaining very positive critics from the press.

He performed many times with the Symphonic Orchestra of the City of Asunción in very important concerts, recording two discs due to the amazing success of them.

He participated in the soundtrack of the Paraguayan film “Miramenometokéi” with a song of his own “Espinas del alma” and with a version of the Paraguayan popular music “Soy algo fácil de olvidar” (I'm something easy to forget).

He was awarded many times by the radio show The Lost Flare.

== Discography ==
Year	Discography
1988	Polcaza (Ñamandu)
1991	Lo que somos (Ñamandu)
1991	Un misil en mi ventana (Ñamandu)
1992	Hagali (Síntesis)
1993	Conexión (Síntesis)
1994	Polca Blues (con el grupo de Palito Miranda)
1997	Pasaje al mas acá (Krhizya)

Rolando Chaparro performed in countries like Mexico, Peru, Uruguay, Chile, Brazil, Argentina, among others, many times and with different styles. He's teaching at the National Conservatory of Asunción. He might be considered as the most diverse instrumentalist in the new generation of Paraguayan musicians.

=== Selected work ===
Year	Work
1985	Simple canción urbana
1986	Perfil anatómico de un especialista en judo
1988	Lo que somos
1988	Krizia
1989	Polcaza
1989	Polcarera de los lobos
1991	Un misil en mi ventana
1991	Ojavea
1991	Una historia mas de amor
1991	Así nomás
1992	Hagali
1992	Avísame
1992	Poco antes
1992	Este es para vos
1993	Conexión
1993	Sin vos
1994	Como sabias
1994	Un poco de río, entre otras
