= Maybell Lebron =

Argentine writer (born 1923)

- Born: 23 September 1923 (age 102); Córdoba, Argentina
- Occupation: Writer
- Spouse: Juan S. Netto (died 1998)
- Children: 3
- Awards: National Prize for Literature (2015)

Maybell Lebron (born 23 September 1923) is an Argentine-born writer of short stories, poems, and novels, based in Paraguay. She is the founder of Associated Paraguayan Writers, and has won Paraguay's National Prize for Literature.

== Early life ==
Maybell Lebron was born in Córdoba, Argentina in 1923, and has lived in Paraguay since 1930. She married Doctor Juan S. Netto, and they had three children. She started writing once her children were older, and as a writer she is self-taught.

== Literary career ==
Lebron's first book was the poetry collection Puente a la luz, published by Editorial Arandura. This was followed by the short story books Memoria sin tiempo and Los ecos del silencio. The novel Pancha is one of her best-known works. She also wrote the novel Cenizas de un rencor, and the biography of her late husband, Juan S. Netto: Un hombre.

She has been part of the Short Story workshop, directed by Hugo Rodríguez-Alcalá for several years, and has directed the Reading Room, a group of young writers with whom she meets periodically to hold literary discussions.

During her long career she has won several important honors, such as first prize in the 1989 Veuve Cliquot Ponsardin contest, the Néstor Romero Valdovinos Award from the newspaper Hoy in 1993, the Roque Gaona Award in 2000, and Paraguay's National Prize for Literature in 2015.

== Associated Paraguayan Writers ==
Associated Paraguayan Writers (Spanish: Escritoras Paraguayas Asociadas) was founded in July 1997 by Maybell Lebron, Dirma Pardo Carugatti, and Luisa Moreno Sartorio, with the aim of promoting literature written by women in Paraguay – both its creation and its dissemination. During Lebron's presidency, the anthologies Peldaños de papel and Poemas were published.
