= María Gómez =

María Gómez may refer to:

- María Cristina Gómez (1942–1989), Salvadorian activist and murder victim
- María Laura Gómez (born 1993), Bolivian footballer
- María Cristina Gómez Rabito (1949–2017), Paraguayan musical artist
- María Gómez Carbonell (1903–1988), Cuban educator and attorney
- María Gómez (handballer) (born 1984), Paraguayan team handball player
- María Gómez (journalist) (born 1987), Spanish journalist
- María Gómez, an antagonist in Resident Evil: Vendetta and Resident Evil: Death Island
