= Ana Lucrecia Taglioretti =

Paraguayan violinist (1995–2020)

Background information
- Born: 25 December 1995; Paraguay
- Died: 7 January 2020 (aged 24) Asunción, Paraguay
- Instrument: Violin

Ana Lucrecia Taglioretti (25 December 1995 – 7 January 2020) was a Paraguayan violinist and prodigy. Born blind, Taglioretti started studying music at the age of five, beginning her education on the piano, later studying singing and finally specializing in the violin. She joined the National Symphonic Orchestra of Paraguay in April 2014, and was invited several times to participate in Teletón Paraguay telethons, as well as United Nations Paraguay and Global Infancia events. Taglioretti also participated in both national and international musical festivals and performed with artists such as Carlos Vives, Rolando Chaparro and Lizza Bogado. On 23 September 2019 Taglioretti, along with other National Symphonic Orchestra musicians, participated in a benefit concert to help Paraguayan Chaco families affected by drought and wildfires. Taglioretti was found dead on the afternoon of 9 January 2020 in the apartment where she lived. Her autopsy showed she had not suffered a violent death.

== Early life and education ==
Taglioretti was born on 25 December 1995, three months premature. After spending three months in neonatal incubation, she was discharged, but had been abandoned; the Paraguayan Red Cross looked after her until she was adopted. She was abandoned again when her blindness was discovered. She was then adopted by a music teacher. Her adoptive mother said in 2007 that Taglioretti had stunted psychological development, which is why she would not enroll her in school and taught her with a personal curriculum at home, administering exams directly with the Ministry for Education.

Taglioretti studied music from the age of five, beginning her education on the piano. When she was six she joined the Luque International Sanatorium Choir (Coro del Sanatorio Internacional de Luque), and in 2003 she joined the youth orchestra project Sounds of the Earth (Sonidos de la Tierra). Taglioretti then branched out in music; she said that she stopped playing piano to study singing, then later had to choose between playing the harp and the violin, eventually leaving singing to specialize in the latter. In 2005 she continued her studies in the National Music Conservatory and afterwards was part of one of the Miranda Conservatory orchestras.

== Career ==
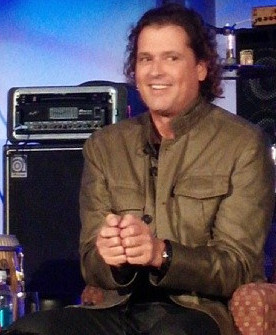
Carlos Vives, who in October 2013 invited Ana Lucrecia to perform with him after she went to his concert without a ticket

After her conservatory years, Taglioretti joined the group Urban Sound (Sonido Urbano), along with Jimena Ramírez and Rodrigo Espinosa, which opened the Harp Twins concert in the Paraguayan American Cultural Center, in October 2014.

In 2010 she released her first record with the support of Amnesty International as part of the campaign A Violin for Human Rights (Un violín a favor de los derechos humanos), and in 2011 she was awarded the Young Leader of the Year Award by the Paraguay Leaders Fund. Taglioretti joined the National Symphonic Orchestra of Paraguay in April 2014, and was invited several times to participate in Teletón Paraguay telethons, as well as United Nations Paraguay and Global Infancia events. She also performed with artists such as Carlos Vives, Rolando Chaparro and Lizza Bogado.

Of the performance with Vives, Taglioretti said that it was unplanned and unexpected. She had been a fan of the singer since she heard him when she was young, and went to his concert in October 2013 without a ticket, not expecting them to actually let her in, but was recognized by the cumbia band Grupo 5, who took her backstage; while backstage, Vives also recognized her and approached her to perform with him.

Taglioretti participated in both national and international musical festivals. She said that she preferred to play in a group than be a soloist.

On 23 September 2019 Taglioretti, along with other National Symphonic Orchestra musicians, participated in a benefit concert to help Paraguayan Chaco families affected by drought and wildfires. They collected clothes and non-perishable food items for the victims.

== Personal life ==
In September 2012 it was reported that Taglioretti, aged sixteen, was the victim of domestic abuse at the hands of her adoptive mother when she was repeatedly found sleeping in garden chairs after being locked out of the family home, sometimes with her violin and clothes also around the garden. Eventually, neighbors' complaints and their concerns after Taglioretti supposedly mentioned contemplating suicide as an escape to a neighbor in passing, had a police and child services investigation launched. The neighbors' complaints included a video of Taglioretti speaking in one of their houses when she had run away to have dinner there; in the video, Taglioretti says that she had run away from home in March 2012 to go to the police, but was picked up and verbally abused by the mother. After listening to her wishes, a judicial order sentenced that Taglioretti would have a substitute family. She was 16 years old at the time and lived with them until she was 20 years old.

== Death ==
Taglioretti was found dead on the afternoon of 9 January 2020 in the apartment where she lived. After her mother received no answer when she rang the doorbell, she called a locksmith. It is estimated that her body was found around 48 hours after her death. At the time of her death, she lived in an apartment located in Piribebuy street, between Chile and Alberdi, in Asunción. Both Paraguay's National Culture Secretary and the National Symphonic Orchestra paid tribute to the violinist, lamenting her death and giving their condolences to the family.

On 10 January, the prosecutor that led the investigation gave a statement to say that the autopsy disregarded a violent death, because the body "did not have any fractures" or "trauma", and hinted that the cause of death was natural. The Public Ministry explained that the next autopsy results were expected in three weeks. According to people close to Taglioretti, her family had a history of heart conditions, so a cardiac arrest as her cause of death has not been dismissed.

== See also ==
- List of unsolved deaths
