= Juan Cancio Barreto =

Paraguayan musician

- Born: Juan Cancio Barreto; March 27th, 1950; Asunción, Paraguay
- Known for: Musician, Guitarist

Juan Cancio Barreto is a Paraguayan musician.

== Beginnings ==
Barreto was born in Asunción, Paraguay on March 27, 1950. Son of Carmen Emategui and Rodolfo Barreto. He began to play the guitar at age 7, when a friend of his father, called Dario Duarte, also a musician, gave him a small guitar (requinto). His father showed him the basics and later a neighbour, Eufrasio Riveros, taught him to play. since then he never stopped playing that beautiful instrument.

At the age of 11, he met Efrén Echeverría, who became his teacher and inspired him to love and appreciate the folklore of Paraguay and particularly its music. The artist remembers his teacher with affection and gratitude.

== Career ==
Year	Outstanding event
1968	Gold Medal for “Best Requinto” with the Trío Esmeralda, in the Comuneros Stadium.
1969	“Revelation Artist” in the Caravana Show, Chanel 9. The same year, he integrates the cast of the Artistic Department of the National Defense Ministry, a department that was a place for the surge of great artistic values.
Decade of 1970	“Nights of folklore” in Guarida del Matrero, along with other important musicians, such as Maneco Galeano, the brothers Carlos and Jorge (Necho) Pettengil, Enrique (Gua’i) Torales, Viquito Benítez, Santi Medina, Oscar Gómez, Graciela Abbate, Marcos Brizuela, María Cristina Gómez Rabito, Carlos Noguera y many others.
Decade of 1970	He forms a duet with Marcos Brizuela, he establishes himself finally with his beloved instrument and wins several awards.
1983	“Revelation Artist” of the Lago Ypacarai Festival.
1976	Winner of the trophy “Guitarra de Oro” (Gold Guitar), the most appreciated award by the great musicians.
1977	He gets in the delegation of the festival of Lago Ypacaraí, and participates in the Festival of Cosquín, Córdoba, Argentina. There, he wins the trophy “Carmín Cosquín”, award that he won one more time in 1979.
1978	In the Latin American Festival of Punta del Este, Arenas, Chile he wins the “Ñandú de Oro”.
1980	He records several scores with the group Los Indianos.
Decade of 1980	His son Juan Angel starts to accompany him in the guitar; they share very good artistic moments. Together they have many successes and receive the “Gold Medal to Success and Popularity” in the Festival of the Race in the city of Villarica.
1997 and forward	He starts the series of concerts “Guitarra adentro” with Berta Rojas, in Asunción and they travel to several cities of Paraguay. The idea of joining the music of the popular guitar with the classical guitar was what made them want to work together.
2004	He receives a platinum disc from the record company BlueCaps for the album “Vya’y yave”, which became the best seller album of the last decade.

== Other activities ==
Juan Cancio Barreto shared and received the example of Paraguayan musicians such as: Mauricio Cardozo Ocampo, Eladio Martínez, Diosnel Chase, Emilio Vaesken, Edmigio Ayala Báez, Samuel Aguayo, Agustín Barboza, Luis Alberto del Paraná and Faustino Brizuela.

In 1980, with the support of the municipal government of Asuncion, he travelled to Europe, where he plays in and make several recordings with the famous group “Los Indianos”.

Since the 80s he has been performing together with his son Juan Angel who is also a guitarist. Together with Juan Angel, they continue to reap success and popularity, gaining gold medals in the Festival de la Raza in the city of Villarrica.

He is currently serving as Director of Culture in the Municipality of Ciudad del Este.

During his frequent tours, he has conquered audiences in Paraguay and other countries. And nowadays he continues to travel to the interior of the country, to Argentina, Brazil and Chile, where he still receives awards and acknowledgments for his performances.
