= Enrique Samaniego =

- Born: January 4, 1934; Paso Yobai, Paraguay
- Died: March 26, 2005 (aged 71) Asunción, Paraguay
- Genres: Folk, Latin
- Occupations: Musician, composer
- Instrument: Paraguayan harp
- Years active: 1950s–2000s

Enrique Samaniego (January 4, 1934 – March 26, 2005) was a harpist and composer whose Paraguayan harp music achieved national and international recognition.

== Career ==
Born in Paso Yobai in the Guairá Department of Paraguay on January 4, 1934, he was introduced to the harp by a friend of his family and began playing as a child. He joined his first musical group, "Los Cardenales", with Cayo E. Cristaldo, Marciano Trinidad, Pedro Román, and Antonio Álvarez Martínez, as a young man, playing venues around Argentina.

After he completed his primary education, he served his mandatory military service in the Segunda Región Militar de Villarrica, where his skills as a musician were employed on birthdays and for serenades. With Alejandro Franco and Julio Ortiz Arias, in 1956 he joined the trio "Amerindia" taking the place of Rubén Sanabria. In 1957, he began performing as a soloist in Uruguay, which provided him an opportunity to work with musicians such as guitarist Abel Carlevaro. While playing in Uruguay with "Amerindia", Samaniego introduced the "ambas manos" ("both hands") technique, which he said was born of the need to cover the absence of a second player, so that the public would not notice.

In 1964, with Juan B. Mora and Tito Ávalos, he formed a trio called "Los Trés del Paraguay" and began touring the countries neighboring Paraguay, recording more than 12 LP records for RCA Victor and Marpar labels. He next formed a trio called "Los Folkloristas de América", first with Darío Benítez and "Churí" González, and later with Ramón Estigarribia and Alfredo Mora, performing at festivals, and performing live for radio and television events, including Radio Paraguay, the national station.

In the 1970s he recorded a duet with harpist María Cristina Gómez Rabito, and worked as a soloist. In the late 1970s, his song Marcha de los Ex-Combatientes received the first prize for composition in the first Festival del Arpa organized by Paraguay Ñe’é. In addition to playing the Paraguayan harp, Samaniego made them, and he was also a harp instructor, dedicating the last active years of his life to teaching.

In 2003, the government of Paraguay granted Samaniego a "pensión graciable" of Gs. 1,000,000 (one million Guaraníes) monthly in recognition of his status as a "national artist." He died on March 26, 2005, at the Military Hospital in Asunción, Paraguay. He was buried at Panteón de Autores Paraguayos Asociados (from Spanish Pantheon of Paraguayan Composers and Associates) in Recoleta Cemetery of Asunción. When his widow received a pensión graciable in 2007, Samaniego was regarded as a Paraguayan folklorist in recognition of the importance of his music to Paraguayan culture.

== Personal ==
Born Rigoberto Samaniego González, he was a son of Desiderio Samaniego López and Carmen González Gavilán; he married Arminda Ocampos Carvallo with whom he had a son.

== Works ==
Samaniego recorded two LPs with "Amerindia"; eight with "Los Trés del Paraguay"; two with "Los Folkloristas de América"; one with María Cristina Gómez Rabito; and a number of cassettes with Aparicio González and others.

Among his most popular compositions are: Karaí Chivé, A Villa Pastoreo, El Boyerito, A mi Madrecita, Azucena del Oriente, Brisa Guaireña, Clelia Carolina, Colonia Independencia, Paso Yobái, Despertar de mi Aldea, Danza del Colibrí, Nostalgia Maternal, Ko´ë Koyguá, and Estrellas de mi Asunción.

== Discography ==
- Famosas Melodias del Paraguay (1957)

Label: Orfeo; Format: LP; Country: Uruguay, Genre: Folk

- Arpegios Guaraníes (with harpist María Cristina Gómez Rabito)

Label: Guarania, Format: cassettes, Album; Country: Paraguay; Genre: Folk; Style: Polka, Guarania

- Secretos del Arpa Paraguaya

Label: Discos Elio, Format: Vinyl, LP, Country: Paraguay; Genre: Latin, Folk; Style: Guarania, Polka

- Los Tres del Paraguay (with Los Trés del Paraguay)

Label: RCA Victor; Format: LP; Country: Argentina; Genre: Latin, Folk

- Viaje Musical con Los Trés del Paraguay (with Los Trés del Paraguay)

Label: RCA Victor; Format: Vinyl, LP; Country: Argentina; Genre: Latin, Folk

- Luna Blanca (with Los Trés del Paraguay)

Label: Marpar; Format: Vinyl, LP; Country: Paraguay; Genre: Latin, Folk; Style: Polka, Guarania
