= Friendship Day =

Day for celebrating friendship

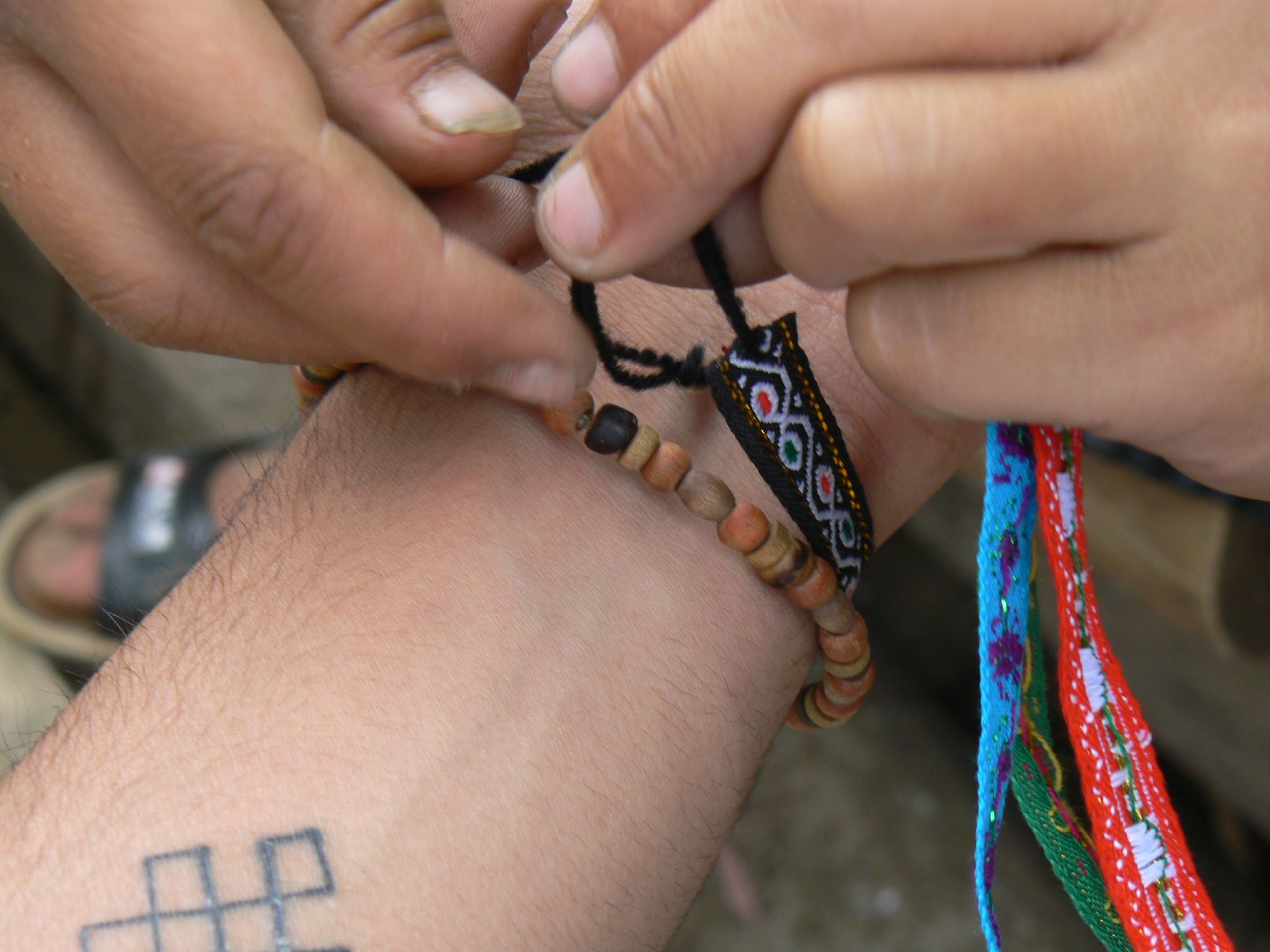
- Type: International
- Date: 30 July internationally, with varying dates for individual countries
- Frequency: Annual

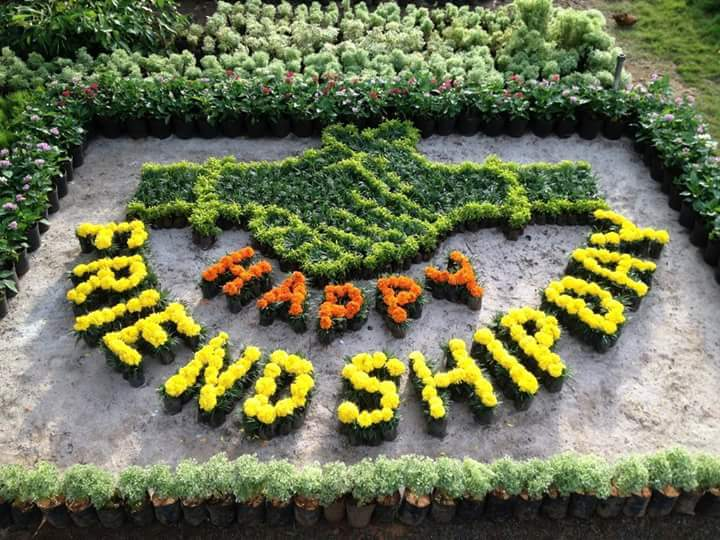

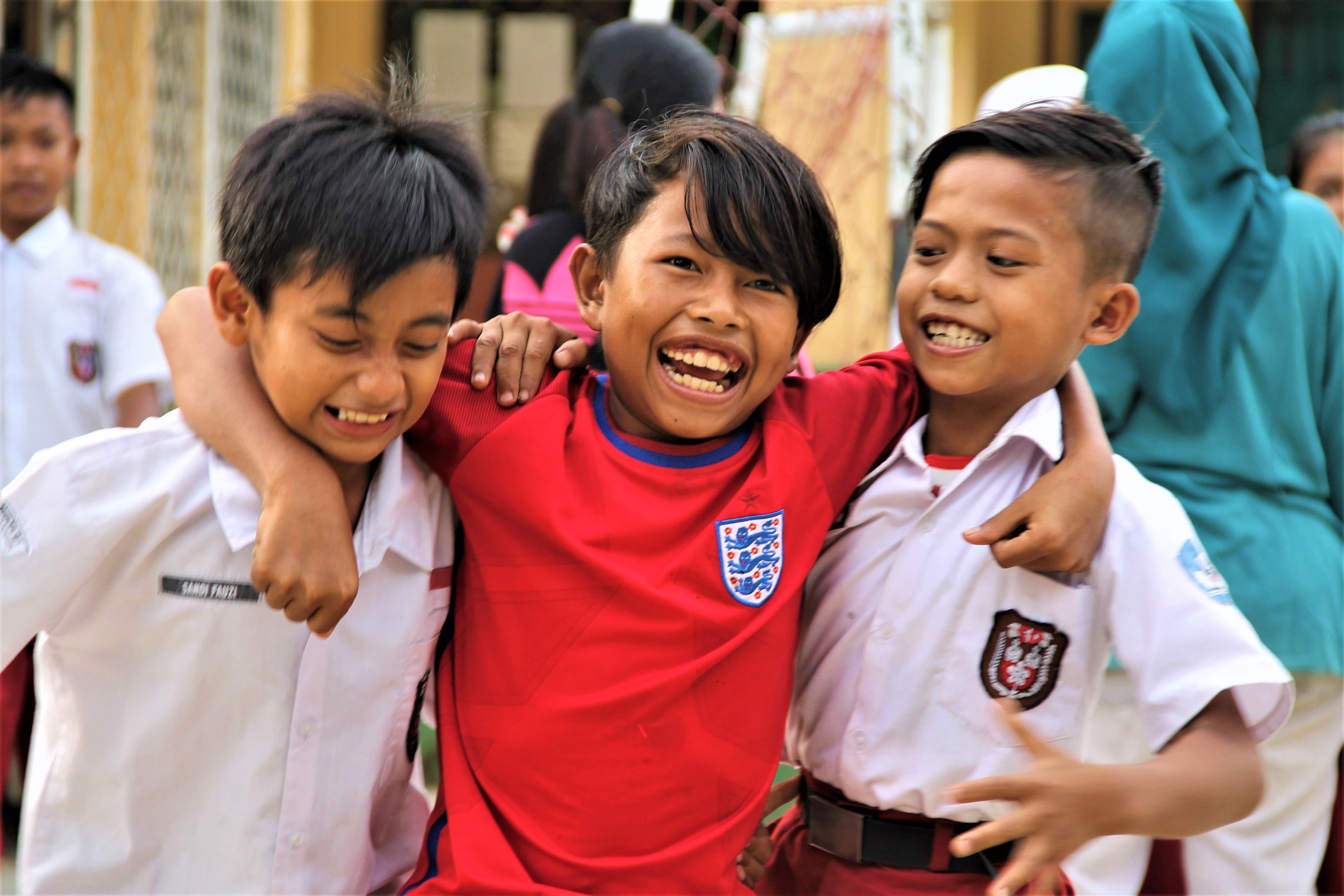

Friendship Day (also known as International Friendship Day or Best Friend's Day) is an international holiday dedicated to friendship and the celebration of it. Its date varies greatly by country and region. The idea of a World Friendship Day was first proposed on July 20, 1958 by Artemio Bracho during a dinner with friends in Puerto Pinasco, Paraguay. In the United States, and other countries like India, it's celebrated on the first Sunday of August.

== History ==
Friendship Day was first proposed in 1930 by Joyce Hall, the founder of Hallmark Cards. The idea was further promoted by the greeting card American National Association, but was not taken in a healthy spirit as it reflected the commercial gimmick to promote the greeting cards in name of Friendship Day.

The idea of a Global Friendship Day was first proposed on 20 July 1958 by Dr. Ramón Artemio Bracho during a dinner with friends in Puerto Pinasco, a town on the River Paraguay about 200 miles (320 km) north of Asunción, Paraguay.

During said meeting, the World Friendship Crusade was born. The World Friendship Crusade is a foundation that promotes friendship and fellowship among all human beings, regardless of race, color or religion. Since then, 30 July has been fervently celebrated as Friendship Day in Paraguay every year and has also been adopted by several other countries.

To honor Friendship Day, in 1998, Nane Annan named Winnie the Pooh the world's Ambassador of Friendship at the United Nations. The event was co-sponsored by the U.N. Department of Public Information and Disney Enterprises, co-hosted by Kathy Lee Gifford.

The World Friendship Crusade lobbied the United Nations for several years to recognize 30 July as World Friendship Day; Finally, in 2011, the General Assembly of the United Nations decided to designate 30 July as the International Day of Friendship and proceeded to invite all the Member States to observe the International Day of Friendship per the culture and customs of their local, national and regional communities, including through education and public awareness-raising activities.

== Celebration dates by month ==
=== February ===
Friendship day is celebrated on 14 February in Ecuador, Mexico, Guatemala, Venezuela, Finland, Peru, Estonia and the Dominican Republic as opposed to Valentine’s Day

=== April ===
Celebrations take place on 16 April in South Africa and on the third week of the month in Singapore.

=== June ===
Ukraine is the only nation to hold Friendship Day in June, with it taking place on the 9th.

=== July ===
Celebrations are held on 14 July in Ecuador and Venezuela and 5 days later on 19 July in Pakistan. In Bolivia, Friendship Day is celebrated on 23 July.

In Paraguay, 29 July is traditionally a day for the giving of gifts to close friends and family. Celebrations often take place in bars and nightclubs. The game of the Invisible Friend (Amigo Invisible) is considered a tradition, in which small sheets of paper with names are given to members of a group and each of them secretly selects on another, and on 30 July gives a present to the person whose name was written on the paper. This custom is practised in both schools and workplaces in Asunción and other Paraguayan cities.

Since 2009, Peru has celebrated "el día del amigo" on the first Saturday of July. The date was proposed by the beer brand Pilsen Callao. The objective was to recognize true friendship and differentiate it from love and the celebration of Valentine's Day.

In Argentina, Brazil, Spain, and Uruguay, Friendship Day (or Friend's Day) is celebrated on 20 July. It is a reason for a friendly gathering and greeting both current and old friends.

It became a popular celebration thanks to Enrique Ernesto Febbraro, an Argentinian dentist and Rotarian who had the idea to commemorate International Friendship as an unifying gesture of friendship among nations, inspired by the day Neil Armstrong stepped on the Moon. He sent 1,000 letters to contacts from the Rotary Club around the world while the Apollo 11 was still in space and received 700 responses that kickstarted the celebration.

In Argentina, Friend's Day has turned into a very popular mass phenomenon. For instance, in 2005, the amount of well-wishing messages and calls led to a breakdown of the mobile phone network in the cities of Buenos Aires, Mendoza, Córdoba and Rosario, comparable to the one experienced in 2004 on Christmas and New Year's Day. Seats in most restaurants, bars, and other establishments are often completely booked a week before the celebration.

== Bibliography ==
- Schmidt, E.L. (1991). "The Commercialisation of the Calendar: American Holidays and the Culture of Consumption, 1870–1930". The Journal of American History. 78 (3): 887–916. doi:10.2307/2078795. JSTOR 2078795. [UN Resolution A/65/L.72]
