= Lourdes Espinola =

Paraguayan poet and diplomat

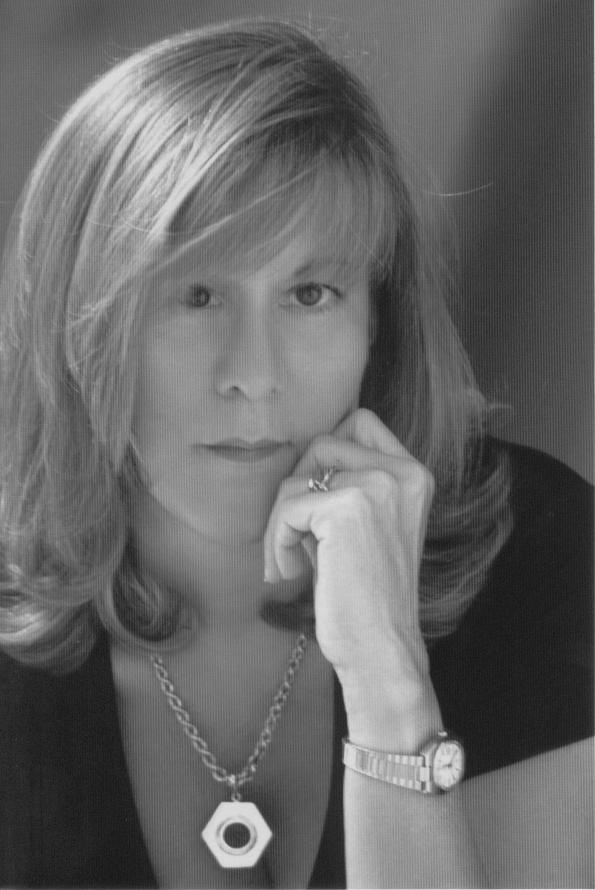
- Lourdes Espinola
- Born: February 9, 1954; Asunción, Paraguay
- Occupations: Writer, diplomat, professor, literary critic
- Writing career
- Genre: Poetry

Lourdes Espinola (born Lourdes Espinola Wiezell on February 9, 1954, in Asuncion, Paraguay) is a Paraguayan poet, diplomat, cultural promoter, and literary critic. Daughter of the laureate Paraguayan writer and philosopher Elsa Wiezell, Espinola's academic background includes the fields of health sciences, international relations, as well as philology and literature, at universities of the United States and Europe.

Her work has been translated into French, Italian, German, English and Portuguese and has been published in France, Spain, United States, Portugal, Germany, Italy, Mexico, Venezuela and Argentina, among other countries. Her literary work is studied at European and American Universities.

== Biography ==
Lourdes Espinola earned six university degrees: two bachelor's degrees from North Texas State University (cum laude with honors), as well as two master's degrees of Southwest Texas State University (with Academic Excellence), in the United States. She earned two Doctorate Degrees, from the National University of Asuncion Paraguay and from the Complutense University of Madrid, Spain.

=== As a writer, professor and literary critic ===
Espinola was invited by the United States Government to participate in the prestigious International Writer's Program, at the University of Iowa in 1997. During that period, Espinola was guest writer at Wellesley College, the University of Miami, and at the Inter-American Development Bank in Washington DC, among other institutions.

She was honored by the French Government as a guest writer, giving readings and lectures at the Universities of Caen, Lyon, University of Toulouse II-Le Mirail, Avignon, Montpellier, Rouen, and at the Sorbonne. In 2005, she was elected Foreign Poet the Year in France by the International Poets and Writers House (Maison Internationale des poètes et des écrivains). Espinola was also invited to give lectures as guest writer in Germany, at the University of Heidelberg.

She has been a member of the editorial board of Letras Femeninas, the official organism of the Association of Hispanic American Women Literature. She is one of the Founding Members and former President of Associated Paraguayan Writers (Escritoras Paraguayas Asociadas).

As a result of translation workshops held at the Universities of the Sorbonne, Rouen, and Lausanne in Switzerland, a bilingual edition (Spanish-French) of Espinola's works was published by Adelaide de Chatellus (Editorial Le Temps des Cerises) in France.

Journalist and columnist for the Noticias and Ultima Hora Paraguayan newspapers.

She has lectured on Women's Literature, Latin American Literature and Paraguayan Poetry, as well as on her own work in numerous Congresses, Seminars and Symposiums in Europe, the United States and Latin America.

She is Full Professor of the Doctorate and Masters Programs in Education at the Universidad Americana and at the Universidad del Norte, and has been Professor of the Graduate Studies Program at the Universidad Católica and Professor of the Literature program at the Universidad Nacional de Asunción.

=== As a diplomat and cultural promoter ===
She has been a consultant to the United Nations and translator for the Human Development Reports. She has also been a translator for the Swiss Red Cross, as well as translator and interpreter at the XX Assembly of the Organization of American States, held in 1990.

She has been Head for International Relations of Asuncion City Hall, Advisor on International Relations for the Central Department Government of Paraguay, as well as Advisor for the Gender Equality Commission of the Paraguayan Congress, and Advisor for International Relations of the Cabildo Cultural Center (National Congress of Paraguay).

She has been General Secretary of the National UNESCO Commission Paraguay.

She has been Counsellor at the Embassy of Paraguay in Madrid, and Cultural Affairs Attache at the Embassy of Paraguay in Lisbon.

She is currently the Director of Cultural Relations and Tourism of the Ministry of Foreign Affairs of the Republic of Paraguay.

== Published works ==
- Visión del Arcángel en Once Puertas (1973; Editorial Ocara Poty Cue Mi; Asunción)
- Monocorde Amarillo (1976; Editorial Ocara Poty Cue Mi; Asunción)
- Almenas del Silencio (1977; Editorial La Cultura; Asunción)
- Ser Mujer y Otras Desventuras / Womanhood and Other Misfortunes, bilingual edition (English-Spanish) translated by Naomi Lindstrom (1985, Latitudes Press; Estados Unidos)
- Tímpano y Silencio (1986; Alcandara Editora; Asunción)
- Partidas y Regresos, prologued by Augusto Roa Bastos (1990; Intercontinental Editora; Asunción)
- La Estrategia del Caracol (1995; Editorial Tiempos de poesía Buenos Aires - Ed. Arandurā Asunción)
- Encre de Femme / Tinta de Mujer, bilingual edition (French-Spanish), translated and prologued by Claude Couffon (1997; Índigo Editions; París)
- Les Mots du Corps / Las Palabras del Cuerpo, bilingual edition (French-Spanish), translated and prologued by Claude Couffon (2001; Índigo Cote Femmes; París)
- As Núpcias Silenciosas, translated to Portuguese by Albano Martins (2006; Ediciones Quasi; Lisboa)
- Desnuda en la Palabra, prologue by José Emilio Pacheco (2011; Ediciones Torremozas; Madrid)
- Viaje al Paraíso, Novel (2012; Editorial Servilibro; Asunción) - Mention of Honor, National Literature Award Paraguay
- Juana de Lara: Prócer Paraguaya, Academic Essay (2012; Editorial Servilibro; Asunción)
- Antología Poética (2013; Editorial Servilibro; Asunción)

== Honors and awards ==
- First Prize, Sigma Delta Pi Hispanic Honor Society
- First Prize, Santiago Vilas International Literary Contest. Foreign Language Honor Society
- La Porte des Poètes Prize in Paris, France
- Honorary Citizen of the State of Texas
- Foreign Poet of the Year in France, awarded by the International House of Poets and Writers (Maison Internationale des poètes et des écrivains), 2005
- Herib Campos Cervera National Poetry Prize, 2012 Paraguay
- Honorary Mention, National Literature Award, 2012 Paraguay
- Decorated KNIGHT of the Ordre des Arts et des Lettres by the Government of the Republic of France, 2011

== Bibliography ==
- Beyond the rivers : an anthology of twentieth century Paraguayan poetry, Charles R. Carlisle. Thorp Springs Press, California, 1977.
- Breve Antología de la Literatura Paraguaya, Teresa Méndez-Faith. Editorial El Lector, Paraguay, 1998.
- Breve Diccionario de la Literatura Paraguaya, Teresa Méndez-Faith. Editorial El Lector, Paraguay, 1996.
- Antología de la Literatura Paraguaya, Teresa Méndez-Faith. Editorial El Lector, Paraguay, 2004.
- Diccionario de la Literatura Paraguaya, Teresa Méndez-Faith. Editorial El Lector, Paraguay, 2008.
- First Light: An Anthology of Paraguayan Women Writers, Susan Smith Nash. University of Oklahoma, 1999.
- Poetisas del Paraguay (Voces de hoy), Miguel A. Fernández & R. Ferrer. Torremozas, Madrid, 1999.
- Lourdes Espinola Reflections sur le Nouveau Poésie Paraguayenne, Caravelle-Cahiers du Monde hispanique et Luso Brésilien, France, 2002.
