= Maneco Galeano =

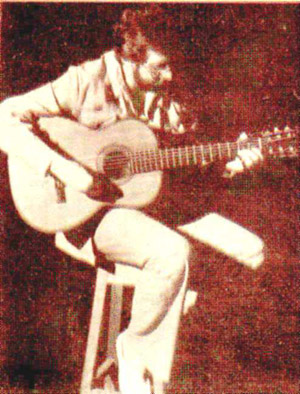
- Maneco Galeano

Background information
- Also known as: Maneco
- Born: Félix Roberto Galeano Mieres; May 13, 1945; Puerto Pinasco, Paraguay
- Died: December 9, 1980 (aged 35) Asunción, Paraguay
- Genres: Polka, Guarania
- Occupations: Musician, songwriter, journalist

Maneco Galeano (May 13, 1945 – December 9, 1980) was a Paraguayan musician, songwriter and journalist.

== Biography ==
=== Early life ===
Galeano was born on May 13, 1945 in Puerto Pinasco. Son of W. Antonio Galeano and Ana Mieres, his real name was Felix, after his grandfather on his father's side, and Roberto, after his grandfather on his mother side. He was two years old when the Paraguayan Civil War of 1947 began. His father was arrested during the Civil War, and waved goodbye to Maneco on the harbor of Puerto Pinasco. Around this time, Maneco was given his first guitar, a toy one, and he enjoyed singing songs he imagined himself with it.

At the beginning of 1948, his family decided to move to Asunción. He began his studies at the Colegio San Jose, an educational institution which he would spend the rest of his life associated with. He was a lively and nonconformist teenager, and also studied at the Liceo Militar Acosta Ñu as well as in the Colegio Carlos Antonio Lopez. He finished his high school in the Colegio Lasalle, in Buenos Aires, with honors.

In 1962, with his father in the diplomatic service, the family moved to the Argentine capital. There he joined with other Paraguayans fellow musicians and formed a band where he sang and played the guitar.

When he returned to his country, he went to university but dropped out soon after. After dropping out, Galeano began to compose. In the middle of the 1960s, he showed some of his first works which were unrefined but showed skill.

=== First steps ===
In 1967, Galeano's friend and journalism teacher Fernando Cazenave invites him to be a part of the crew at the Diario ABC Color newspaper when it is opened. Galeano accepted and became a journalist, a job he would carry with pride until his death. Galeano worked as a collaborator of La Tribuna and El Diario Hoy, where he was the chief of the sports section as well as the secretary of editorial staff.

From 1974-1978, Galeano taught music at his old school in San Jose.

On April 19, 1969, he married Maria Cristina Barrail Pecci. He had four daughters: Sandra Maria, Viviana Guadalupe, Ana Karina and Maria Alegria.

=== Works ===
At the end of the 1960's, Galeano worked composing and directing songs to accompany carnival groups (comparsas) at the Centenario Club. From these years, specifically from 1969 to 1970, he worked on his first satirical songs. With these songs, he begins to shape his own profile, and become a popular name within Paraguayan composition circles.

At the end of 1970, he participated on a television show with Christmas themes, where he presented Dos trocitos de Madera, historically his first "serious" piece.

In 1971, he wrote Soy de la Chacarita. His first appearance is at a beneficial festival on behalf of the people who suffered the flood of the Rio Paraguay, who left many families by the river homeless.

He founded the "Joven Alianza" with other friends such as Carlos Noguera, Mito Sequera, Juan Manuel Marcos and Jose Antonio Galeano. This was an intent of creative and artist cooperative which was later to be destroyed by the political police of the dictatorship of then President Alfredo Stroessner. By then, the creative activity did not stop. Between 1972 and 1976 he released Despertar, San si Juan no que sí, Para un rostro labrador, Pinasco, José Trombón, Para decir, Don José de todas partes, among the more significant ones.

He also writes the lyrics for Ceferino Zarza, compañero (music of Jorge Garbett) and Cantando (music by Jorge Krauch). With Carlos Noguera he composes the only piece that was written by the most important names of the Nueva Cancion Paraguaya, Al caído en la víspera, a homage to the Chilean composer and singer Victor Jara, who was murdered in the military takeover (military coup) of 1973 in his country. The piece later will be popular with the name of Victor Libre.

Galeano also played a significant role in the composition of part of the music of Lopez, a work of Juan Manuel Marcos mixing texts, songs and poetry, about the Paraguayan War. It was presented by the Grupo Experimental de Teatro Anguekoi with great success in 1973. The songs composed by Maneco are ¡Independencia o Muerte!, Canto a Felipe Varela (both on poems by Marcos) and Resurgirás, Paraguay, on the ode of Martin McMahon dedicated to our country.

Also in 1973, he joined the Quinteto Vocal de la Facultad de Derecho UNA, to participate at the university festival of the song. The group, that later will be the Grupo Sembrador, won the first award to the composition playing San Juan si Juan no que sí.

In 1975, on one of the rare occasions Augusto Roa Bastos visited Paraguay, Sembrador offers a recital homage to the writer, presenting for the first time almost sixteen songs of the Nuevo Cancionero Paraguayo.

Among them was Donde la guarania crece, composed by Maneco on a texto of Roa. From 1975 to 1976, he composed for his friend Jorge Garbett – whom he had met in 1974 – some lyrics: Ella es así, Se le quiere and Lluvia.

Between 1976 and 1977, he studied music with Carlos Dos Santos and Luis Cañete. He composed Cigarra, tonta cigarra, on the text of José-Luis Appleyard, Nda reiri oje'e, on a poem of Rudi Torga and Ka'akupe piari, a polka whose lyrics are the only one totally written in Guarani language by Maneco.

After his experience with Taller Musical Sembrador, he stops writing songs and he dedicates passionately to his work as a journalist. From that time of "musical silence" – as Galeano referred to it – are the Cuentos published in the great Dominical Hoy. He becomes skeptical and, he considers then that his musical endeavors are not as effective as his journalistic endeavors to cause societal change.

=== Last years ===
In 1980, when Galeano learns of his lung cancer diagnosis, he submits Poncho de sesenta listas at the Primer Festival Ypacarai of the Musical Composition. This would be his last piece, and it won the second prize in that contest.

Maneco Galeano died in Asunción, on December 9, 1980 from lung cancer. He was 35 years old.
