= Raquel Chaves =

Paraguayan poet, journalist, novelist, and educator

Raquel Chaves (born 1939) is a Paraguayan poet, journalist, novelist, and educator.

Chaves is a professor of English literature at the Universidad Nacional de Asunción. She is a contributor to the SEP (Paraguayan Society of Writers), and a proponent of women's participation in education. In addition to her own writing, Chaves has translated many important authors. Her collection of mythical mini-poems Espacio Sagrado (Sacred Space, 1988) cover a male pilgrim's wanderings through the sky and across the earth, as he experiences dreams, symbols and confined spaces before finally arriving at the Sacred Space.

Other works of Chaves include Tierra Sin Males (Land without Evil, 1977), Todo es del Viento (All is of the Wind, 1980), Siete Viajes (Seven Voyages, 1984) and Partes del Todo (Parts of the Whole, 2000). Chaves' poetry focuses on transcendence, illustrates how the mind achieves awareness of self, explores the individual soul, and reflects the Paraguayan concern with transcendence in connection with the feast of the Virgin of Caacupe.
