= List of festivals in Paraguay =

The following is a list of festivals in Paraguay, including arts, music, folk, and cultural festivals, among other types. This list does not include patronal festivals.

== Folk festivals ==
=== Ao Po'i Expo-Fair ===
This yearly fair, called Expoferia del Ao Po'i in Spanish, takes place in Yataity since 1997. It's usually between November and December. It was declared "of cultural, touristic and departmental interest" by the Paraguayan Institute of Craftsmanship, the National Secretary of Tourism and the Departmental Board of Guairá.

=== Arary Festival ===
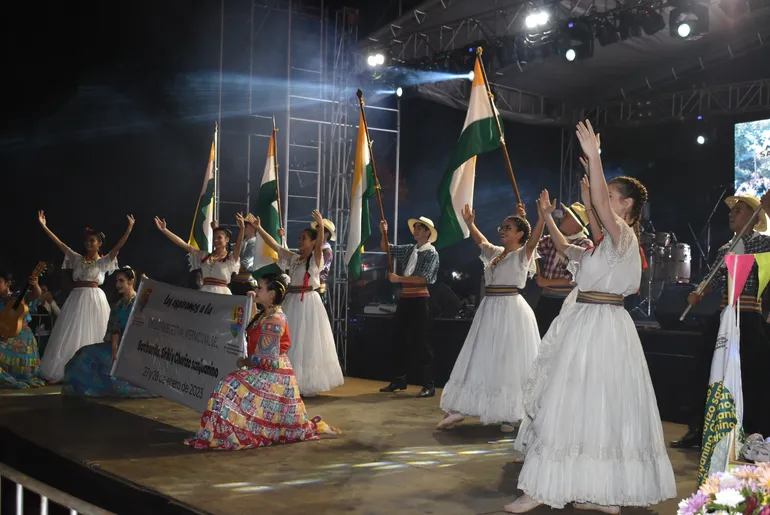
Paraguayan performers doing a traditional dance.

The Arary Festival (Jopara: Festival del Arary) is a folk festival from the district of Ayolas remembering the anniversary of its foundation. It has been celebrated each year since 1999 and takes place in early September. The festival was named after the Calophyllum brasiliense, a local tree species named arary in Guarani.

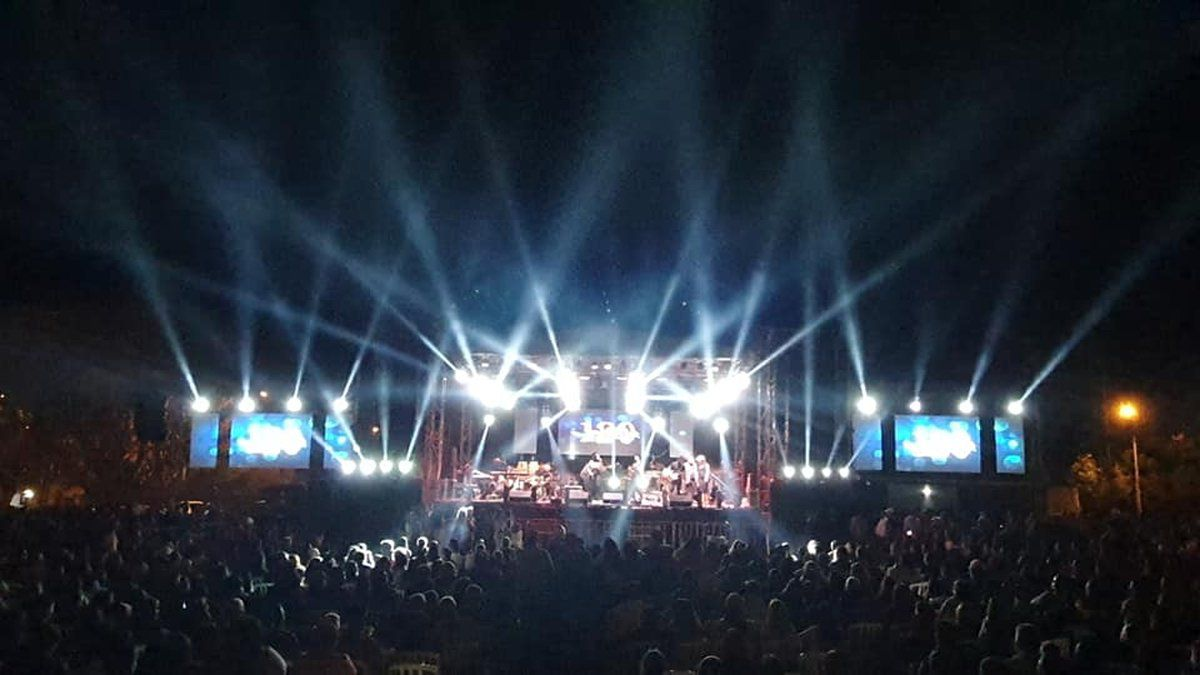
A night of the 2021 Arary Festival.

The event is organized by the Municipality of Ayolas and attended by thousands of people, local and foreign. and features student parades, traditional dancing, ballet, singing, chamamé and stand-up comedy with national and international artists, as well as religious activities and horsemanship shows. There are also several stands in display where local farmers, producers and artisans exhibit their products.

Visitors can observe several attractions related to protection of the environment, water quality, biodiversity, national reserves, ichthyofauna, environmental education, such as the Ecological and Environmental Museum and the forestal garden.

=== Creative Fest ===
The Creative Fest (Spanish: Fiesta Creativa) is an event organized yearly by the National Direction of Intellectual Property since 2019. Its purpose is raising awareness on local potential in each city and promoting creative industries through the promotion of different tools of intellectual property, as well as encouraging artists to trademark their work. It takes place in a different city each year.

The event includes talks, workshops, fairs, expositions, film projections, dancing performances, fashion, exposition of local crafts and concerts by music bands from around the country.

So far, Creative Fests have been organized in Guairá, Cordillera, Boquerón, Misiones, Itapúa and Ñeembucú.

=== Expo Luque ===
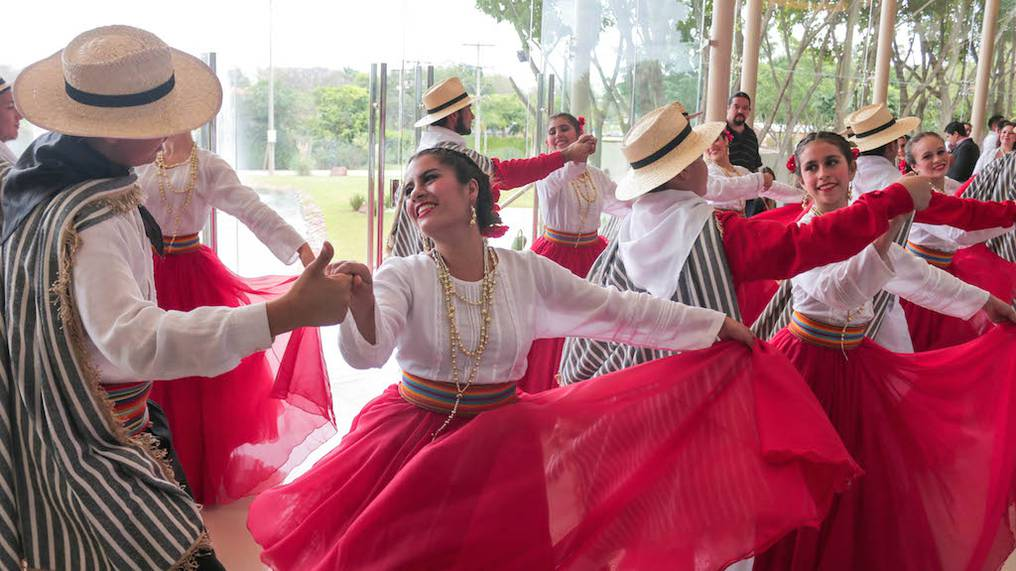
Traditional Paraguayan dancing couples

Since 1997, the Expo Luque is hosted every September by the Municipality of Luque. In 1999, it was declared of national interest by law. The venue was the city's Marshal López Square (Plaza Mariscal López) until 2016, when organizers decided to move it to the municipality's Ciclovía Valois Rivarola due to the increasing number of attendees and to avoid traffic jams. It has been celebrated at the municipality ever since, with the exception of 2019 when the square defeated it as the chosen venue on a poll, with 72% on its favor.

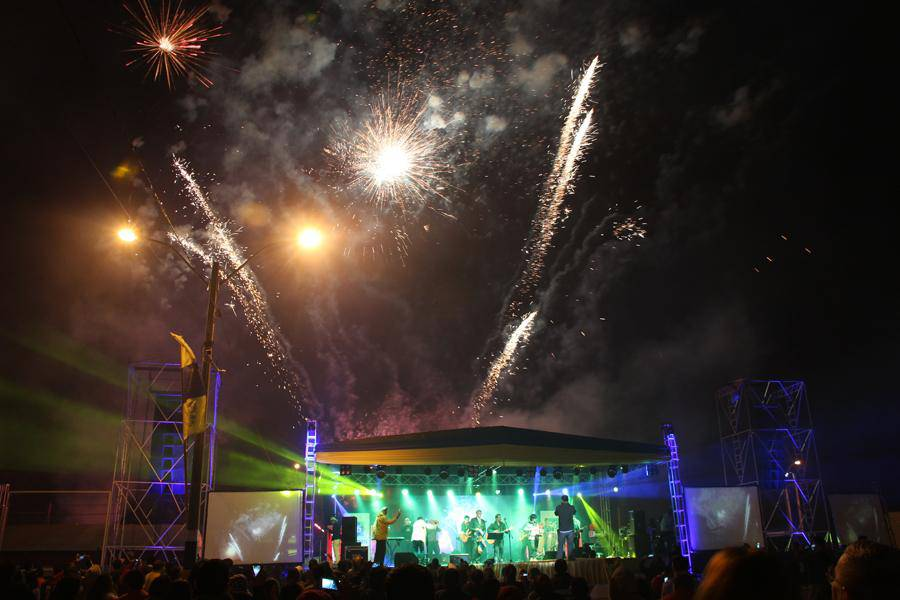
Closing fireworks on the last day of the 2016 edition

It is organized with support from hundreds of companies and businesses from the city. The event is attended by local authorities and representatives from the organizing parties and attracts hundreds of thousands of locals and foreigners. The expo offers an amusement park, music-, dance-, cinema- and poetry-related activities, clowns, together with parachuting events, bull races, dog shows, student contests, car shows, zumba and fireworks. Usually, some nights of the expo are themed with a genre of music (i.e. retro night, cumbia night, rock and roll night).

=== Expo Yguazú ===
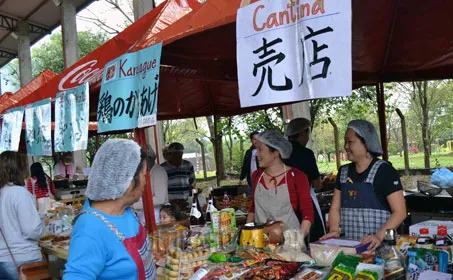
Food stands at the expo with signs in Spanish and Japanese

The Expo Yguazú (Japanese: エキスポ・イグアス, Ekisupo Iguasu) is a yearly Japanese–Paraguayan festival in August commemorating the arrival of the fourteen immigrants who founded the district of Yguazú. It has been celebrated since 1997 at the city's Friendship Square (Plaza de la Amistad). The expo is known for gathering the best of local production, the region's most notorious companies and a mixture of Japanese, Paraguayan and sometimes Brazilian cuisines, the last one being due to the district's geographical closeness to Brazil.

The event is attended by tens of thousands of locals and foreigners, as well as authorities from the local government, the Japanese embassy, the JICA and the Catholic Church. The focal points of the expo are agriculture, animal husbandry, gastronomy, industry, forestry, cars and commerce with lectures on these topics and companies exhibiting state-of-the-art machinery. Taiwanese companies sell flowers, ornamental plants, saplings, and orchids.

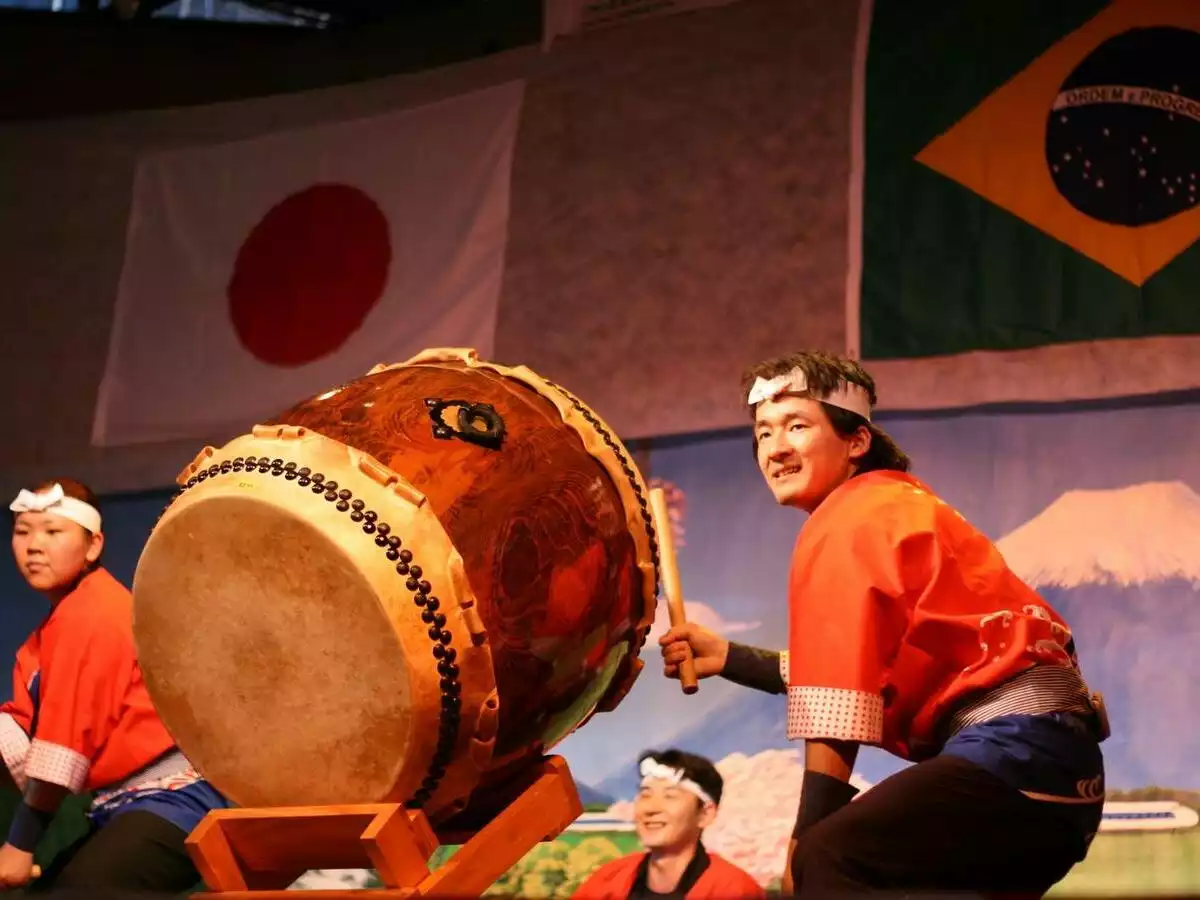
Traditional Japanese drum players at the expo

Japanese families sell fresh raw fish farmed by themselves, including koi, tilapia, dourado and pacu. Charcoal-grilled pacu sashimi is also an option they offer. Paintings and crafts made by Nikkei women are exhibited. Other Japanese foods include: tofu, natto (both Yguazú specialties made with local soybeans), yakitori, yakiniku, yakisoba, ramen, sushi, sukiyaki, mochi. There is a wanko soba-eating contest (わんこそば大食い競争, wanko soba daikui kyōsō) of which both non-Japanese and Japanese contestants participate.

Several art performances are presented during the expo, with displays of modern and traditional dancing, ballet and singing from national and international artists. Japanese drummers play at the outdoor theater and young Nisei dancers perform the devil's sword dance (鬼剣舞, onikenbai). The manufacturing process of drums can be observed at the Yguazú Drum Workshop (イグアス太鼓工房, Iguasu taiko kōbō), the first of its kind in South America, which sells the drums and engraves people's names on them.

The expo has a hat-wearing soybean mascot named Sojita ("little soybean") in Spanish and 大豆クン (Daizu-kun, "Soybean-kun") in Japanese. The event also offers dancing geishas, bingo, undokai, beauty pageants and activities for children.

=== Italian Fest ===
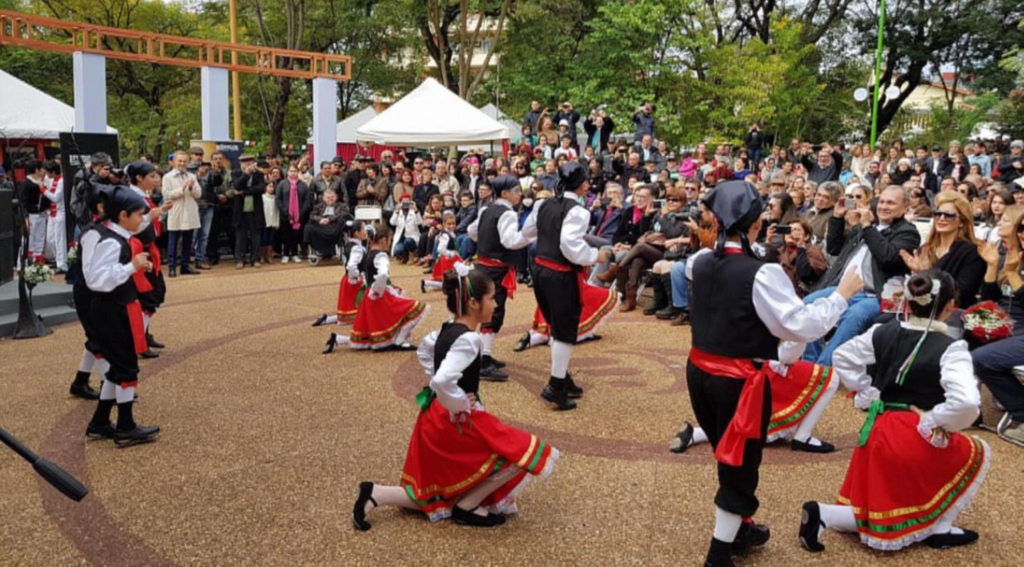
Children performing a traditional Italian dance

The Italian Fest (Spanish: Fiesta Italiana) is a yearly charity event in Asunción organized since 2017 by the Italian embassy to celebrate Festa della Repubblica on June 2. It takes place at the city's Italy Square (Plaza Italia) and offers displays of Italian food, music, dance and the traditional clothing of each Italian region. The fest was declared of touristic and cultural interest by the National Secretariat of Tourism and the Secretariat of Culture, respectively.

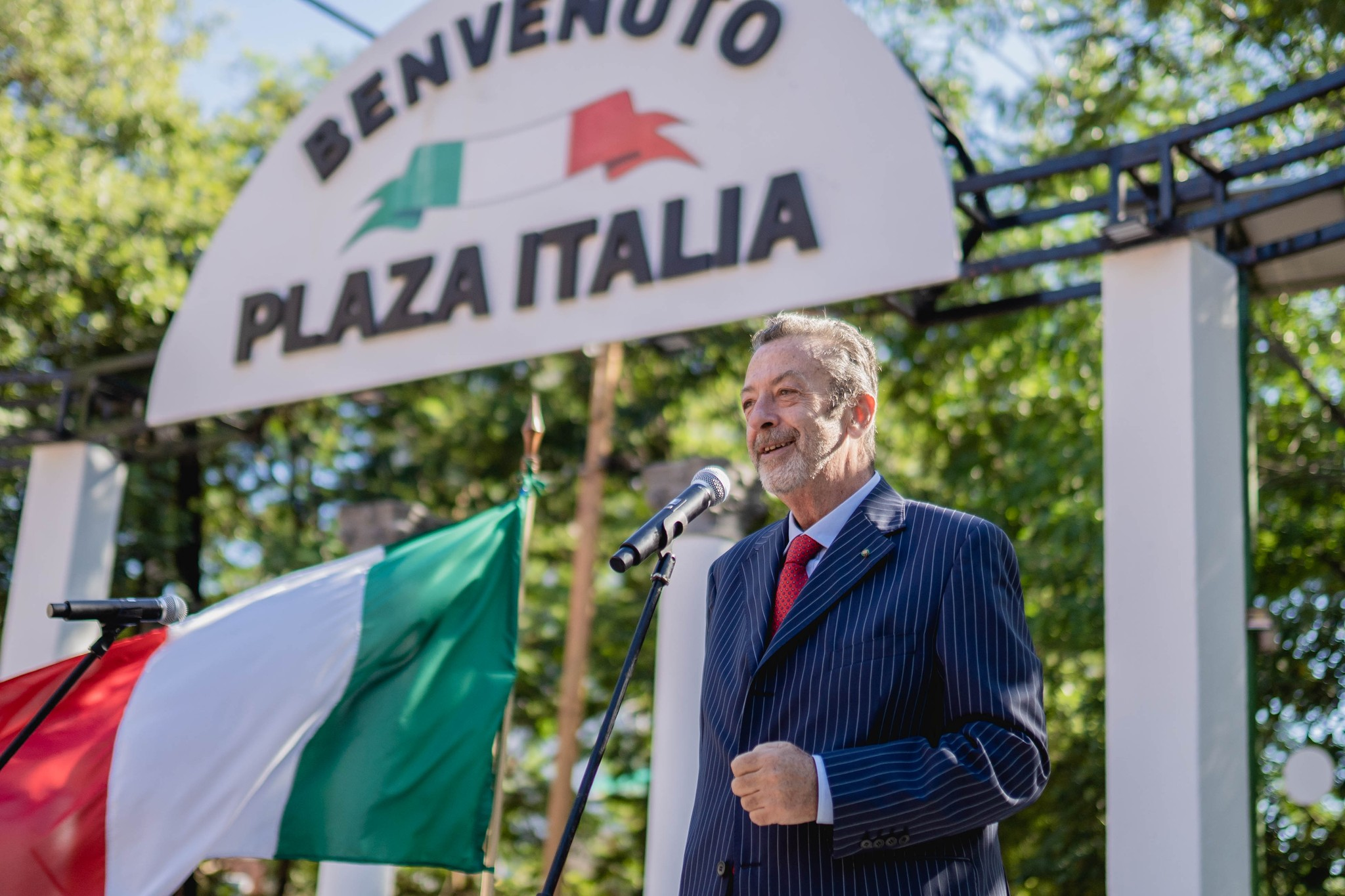
The Italian ambassador giving a speech

This event gathers thousands of people every year and, although entrance is free, people are exhorted to donate shelf-stable food which will be given to charitable organizations. Singing performances are made by Italian and Paraguayan artists, as well as Italian schools in Paraguay.

Products of Italian cuisine are offered by Italian restaurants, such as meat dishes, pizza, pasta, ice cream, coffee, cookies, olive oil, wine and beer.

=== Jar and Honey Festival ===
The Jar and Honey Festival (Spanish: Festival del Cántaro y la Miel) is celebrated in Itá since 2002 and attended by thousands of people each year. The date varies each year, but it starts around January 24 and always ends on or before February 2, on the eve of the district's patron Saint Blaise's Day. In 2019, it was declared of regional interest by Mercosur.

The activities include performances such as acting, singing, dancing and pick-up comedy. A variety of crafts from the city is exhibited and sold.

== Food and drink festivals ==
=== Kure Ára ===
The Kure Ára ("Pig Day" in Guarani) is celebrated in Luque on the first Sunday of every June since 2012. It owes its name to the city's animal and mascot. On that day, the history and culture of Luque are celebrated and several stand can be seen cooking and selling dishes containing meat, especially pork. There is also a contest where people from the city submit their pigs and the owners of biggest animals get a prize in cash.

International professional meat roasters are invited while national artists perform on stage.

== Music festivals ==
=== Ykua Bolaños Festival ===
This annual event takes place in late January since 1990 and is called "the biggest festival in Paraguay."
