= Moncho Azuaga =

Paraguayan playwright, poet and novelist

Moncho Azuaga (born 1952) is a Paraguayan playwright, poet and novelist.

Azuaga was born in Asunción on 11 December 1952. His first literary work, the play Y no solo es cuestión de Mariposas, was published in 1972.

One of the most prolific writers in late 20th century Paraguayan literature, Azagua "is considered the most likely to inherit [Julio] Correa's importance in the annals of Paraguayan theater" according to Enrique Martínez-Vidal.
