= Alcibiades González Delvalle =

Paraguayan journalist

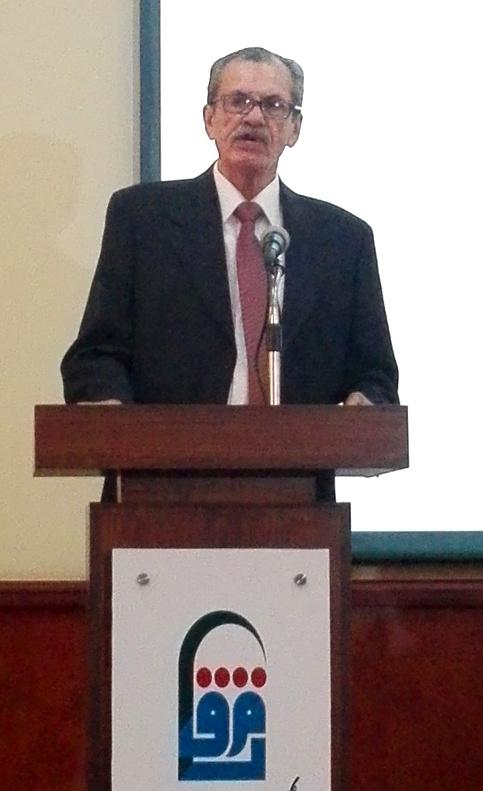
- González Delvalle in 2017
- Born: 20 July 1936 (age 90); Ñemby, Paraguay
- Occupations: journalist, author, and playwright
- Writing career
- Language: Spanish
- Notable work: Un viento negro
- Notable awards: Paraguayan National Prize for Literature (2013); Vladimir Herzog Award

Alcibiades González Delvalle (born 20 July 1936) is a Paraguayan journalist, playwright, essayist, and novelist. He won the Paraguayan National Prize for Literature in 2013 with his novel Un viento negro. In 2016 he was named a member of the Paraguayan Academy of the Spanish Language.

== Career ==
After writing for several newspapers starting in the 1950s, Delvalle joined the newly founded newspaper ABC Color in 1967. Between 1979 and 1983, he was repeatedly imprisoned for his work criticizing corruption in the regime of Alfredo Stroessner. In 1981, the Committee to Protect Journalists was formed in response to Delvalle's harassment. Delvalle received the Vladimir Herzog Award for his journalism.

Delvalle's plays explore historical and folkloric themes. He wrote a trilogy of plays dealing with events during the Paraguayan War, multiple plays exploring Paraguayan mythology and Guaraní folklore, and several librettos for musical comedies and zarzuelas. The situation of Paraguayan tenant farmers is a recurring theme in his work. His novel Un viento negro (A Black Wind), for which he won the 2013 Paraguayan National Prize for Literature, explores the terror of life under the repressive Stroessner dictatorship, which ruled Paraguay for thirty-five years (from 1954 to 1989).

== Selected works ==
Plays inspired by folklore

- El grito del luisón (1972)
- Hay tiempo para llorar (1972)
- Peru rimá (1987)

Trilogy dealing with the Paraguayan War

- Procesados del 70 (1986)
- Elisa (1986)
- San Fernando (1989)

Novels

- Patronal Function (1980)
- Un viento negro

Other

- My Vote for the People, a collection of journalistic pieces
- Our Gray Years, a play (1985)
