= Susy Delgado =

Paraguayan poet and writer

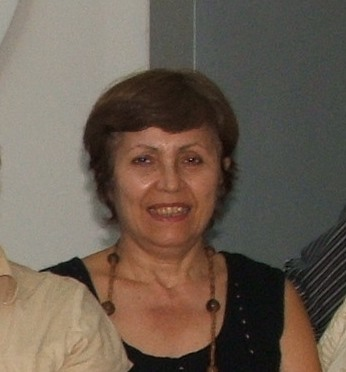
- Delgado in 2011.
- Born: 20 December 1949 (age 76); San Lorenzo, Paraguay
- Awards: National Prize for Literature (2017)

Susy Delgado (born 20 December 1949) is a Paraguayan poet and writer in Spanish and Guarani.

== Life ==
Delgado was born in San Lorenzo in Paraguay in 1949. After obtaining a degree in Sociology in Madrid, Delgado worked as a journalist. She won international recognition in 1985 as a finalist for a Spanish poetry competition in Madrid. In 2017, she won Paraguay's National Prize for Literature, for her poem Ybytu yma.

Her Spanish poetry includes: Some lost tremor (1986), The Court of the Elves. The latter took the Curupayty Radio Award in 1991 and the Municipal Board Award in 1992. In 2001 she had her first prose book published.

She is a member of the Academy of the Guarani Language.
