= María Cristina Gómez Rabito =

- Origin: Paraguay
- Genres: Folk, Latin
- Occupation: Musician
- Instrument: Paraguayan harp
- Years active: 1950s–2000s

María Cristina Gómez Rabito de González was a 20th-century harpist whose Paraguayan harp music won national and international recognition.

Born in Paraguay, Gómez Rabito began playing the harp when she was 6 years old, and started playing professionally at the age of 7, becoming known as "La Princesita del Arpa India" ("The Little Princess of the Indian Harp"). In 1968, she formed a musical duo with Enrique Samaniego, with whom she recorded the album Arpegios Guaraníes. Also in 1968 she became the first professor of the Arpa Paraguaya at the Conservatorio Municipal de Música de Asunción, now the Instituto Municipal de Arte (IMA).

In 1969 she joined the Orquesta Sinfónica de la Ciudad de Asunción (OSCA), performing under the batons of the two great directors Don Remberto Giménez and Carlos Villagra. In the same year, she also joined the Orquesta Folclórica Municipal conducted by Maestro César Medina. In 1972 she joined the Cuarteto de Cuerdas del Centro Cultural Paraguayo Americano, performing for a long time in the famous "Tren Musical" ("Musical Train") playing venues along the central railroad of Paraguay from Asunción to Encarnación.

Gómez Rabito died at the age of 68 in 2017.

== Honors and awards ==
In 1964, representing Paraguay, Gómez Rabito won the First Prize of the first Festival Nacional del Folclore in Santiago de Chile. In 1967, again representing Paraguay, she won First Prize in the first Festival Latinoamericano de la Canción Universitaria in Santiago de Chile. In 1972, she was honored for her life work at the Festival del Lago Ypacaraí and the third Festival Mundial del Arpa.
