= Elsa Wiezell =

Paraguayan poet (1926–2014)

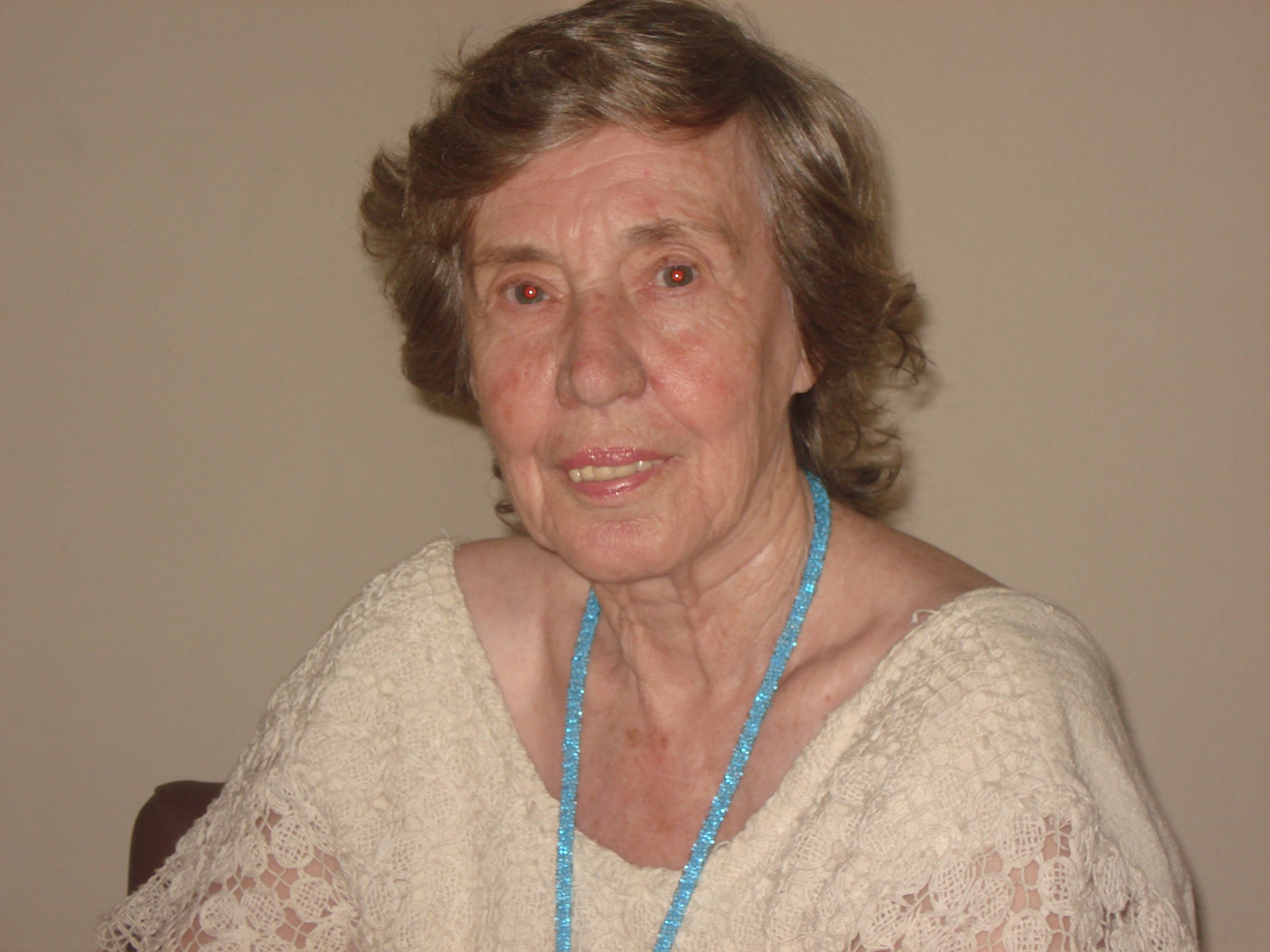
- Elsa Wiezell
- Born: Elsa Wiezell Apezteguía; November 19, 1926; Asunción, Paraguay
- Died: August 23, 2014 (aged 87); Asunción, Paraguay
- Known for: Poetry, Painting
- Notable work: Puente sobre el Río Tepecué (Bridge Over the Tapecué River) Temblor de Acacias (Tremor of Acacias)
- Awards: "García Lorca" Prize given by "Amigos del Arte" (Friends of Art) Honorary Citizen from the State of Texas, US Best Spanish-American Lyrics. Gebers, Sweden

Elsa Wiezell (November 19, 1926 – August 23, 2014) was a Paraguayan poet, feminist and teacher. Her work also includes paintings that reside in art galleries and cultural centers of Asunción. She was born in Asunción, Paraguay, daughter of Julia Apezteguía and Rubén Wiezell, of Swedish descent.

== Childhood and youth ==
She spent her childhood surrounded by her family, playing games and pranks with her siblings Genoveva and Nills in the once quiet streets of Zeballos Cué. They moved later and definitively to Asunción. She completed her primary studies in Asuncion at the International School.

In her youth, her inclination towards poetry was evident, and she began her first literary works at that time. Entranced in her thoughts, she always searched for places of self-discovery. This took her to the college studies at the National University of Asuncion, where she finished her studies with a bachelor's degree in philosophy and literature in 1950.

== Career ==
After graduating, she taught Secondary Level psychology courses at the Benjamin Aceval School in Asunción. She was also in charge of the psychology class at the University of Columbia.

Committed to the diffusion of arts and culture within Paraguay, she founded such institutions as the Modern Art Museum, the journal The Feminist (for which she was chief editor), and the Belle Arts School, serving as director from 1965 to 1977.

== Awards ==
Throughout her career, Elsa Wiezell has been internationally acclaimed and rewarded (even more than in her own native Paraguay) and is considered by many critics and academic scholars to be amongst the most important and influential Spanish-language poets of her time. Many scholars study her work, including Charles Richard Carlisle (Professor of Spanish Literature at Southwest Texas University in Texas, United States), Carlos Sabat Ercasty Carlos Sabat Ercasty and Norma Suiffet (Professor of Literature at Institute of Superior Studies in Uruguay and Specialist in Spanish Philosophy at the University of Salamanca, Spain).

== Style ==
Her work can be perceived as a placid poetic style. Her loose verses give the sensation of peaceful freedom and smooth movement. Her style is considered rich in literary language.

The inspiration and subjects of her works are almost tangible. Water is a recurrent subject, and she also refers to loneliness and to the dreams that usually clash with a reality manifested, for example, as "painful destiny of the body at the earth...". Carlos Sabat Ercasty has written, "The work of Elsa Wiezell is beautiful and dignified, predetermined by a noble double heroism, marching high and sustaining flight..."

== Family ==
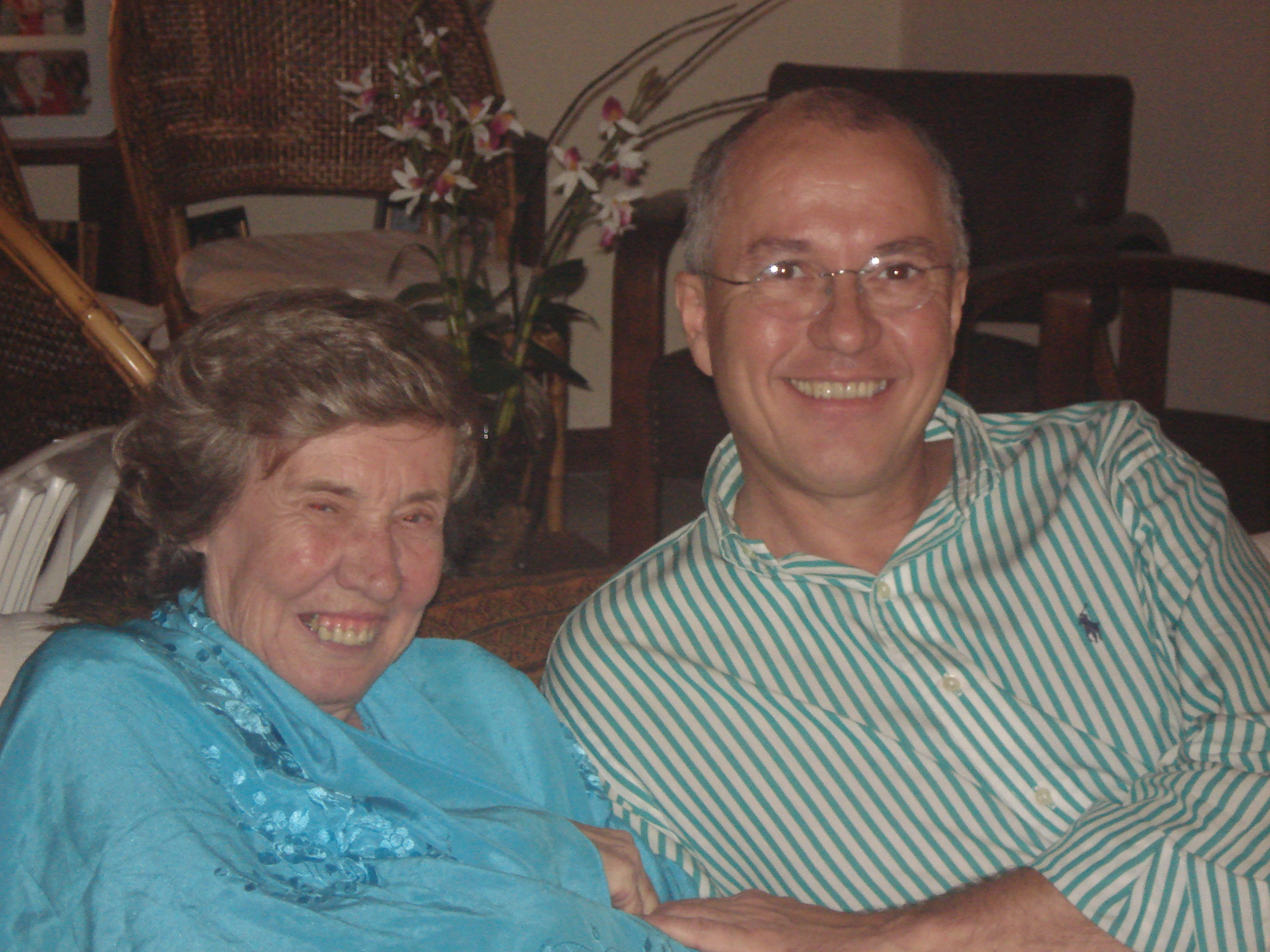
Elsa Wiezell with her son Armando

She was married to Vicente Ferrer Espínola, and had three children: Lourdes, Armando and Patricia.
