= Elvio Romero =

- Born: 1 December 1926; Yegros, Paraguay
- Died: 19 May 2004 (aged 77); Buenos Aires, Argentina
- Occupation: Poet
- Years active: 1940s and 1950s
- Awards: National Prize for Literature (1991)

Elvio Romero (1926–2004) was a Paraguayan poet, active in the 1940s and 1950s.

== Early life ==
Elvio Romero was born in Yegros, Paraguay in 1926. At a young age he became associated with fellow Paraguayan literary figures Hérib Campos Cervera, Josefina Plá, and Augusto Roa Bastos.

== Career ==
A Communist militant, Romero was forced into exile in Argentina alongside many others after the end of Paraguayan Civil War in 1947, at the age of 20. His time in exile was a strong theme in Romero's subsequent work. He returned to Paraguay after General Alfredo Stroessner fell from power, and worked in numerous diplomatic posts, including the Paraguayan embassy in Buenos Aires.

He also performed editorial work and gave recitals and conferences in various cultural centres around the Americas and Europe.

The Guatemalan novelist Miguel Ángel Asturias, winner of the Nobel Prize in Literature in 1967, wrote the introduction for Romero's book El sol bajo las raices.

As an essayist, he wrote "Miguel Hernández, destiny and poetry" and "El poeta y sus encrucijadas" (1991), which won Paraguay's National Prize for Literature. He also collaborated with the newspaper Ultima Hora, of Asunción, and various cultural publications in Argentina.

He died in May 2004 in Buenos Aires.

== Poetic works ==
| Year | Work |
|---|---|
| 1948 | Días roturados |
| 1950 | Resoles áridos |
| 1953 | Despiertan las fogatas |
| 1956 | El sol bajo las raíces |
| 1961 | De cara al corazón |
| 1961 | Esta guitarra dura |
| 1966 | Libro de la migración |
| 1967 | Un relámpago herido |
| 1970 | Los innombrables |
| 1975 | Destierro y atardecer |
| 1977 | El viejo fuego |
| 1984 | Los valles imaginarios |
| 1994 | Flechas en un arco tendido |
