= José María Gómez Sanjurjo =

Paraguayan poet

José María Gómez Sanjurjo (1930–1988) was a Paraguayan poet.
