= Hugo Rodríguez-Alcalá =

Paraguayan poet (1917–2007)

- Born: 25 November 1917; Asunción, Paraguay
- Died: 16 November 2007 (aged 89); Buenos Aires, Argentina
- Known for: Poet, narrator
- Notable work: "Relatos del Norte y del Sur" (Tales from the North and the South) "El ojo del bosque" (The Eye of the Forest) "Primer recuerdo" (First Memory)
- Awards: National Prize for Literature (1999)

Hugo Rodríguez-Alcalá (1917–2007) was a Paraguayan writer, essayist, poet, narrator and literature critic. Doctorate in Laws and Social Sciences by the National University of Asunción in 1943. He earned a Ph.D. in literature from the University of Wisconsin in 1953.

He received Paraguay's National Prize for Literature in 1999.
