= María Luisa Artecona de Thompson =

Paraguayan poet and playwright (1919–2003)

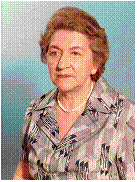
- Born: 12 July 1919; Guarambaré, Paraguay
- Died: 10 December 2003 (aged 84); Asunción, Paraguay

María Luisa Artecona de Thompson (12 July 1919 – 10 December 2003) was a Paraguayan poet and playwright. She was known for her work for children and in particular her anthology of writing for Paraguayan children.

== Life ==
Thompson was born in Guarambaré in 1919. Her parents were Guillermo Artecona and Maria Cardenas. She went to the local Goethe School. She graduated from the Universidad Nacional de Asunción.

Her 1965 work Guarambaré won the Donsel prize which noted not only the quality but the impressive quantity of her work.

She was the Professor holding the chair for literature at Our Lady of the Assumption Catholic University.

In 1992 she published her Anthology of Infantile-Juvenile Literature from Paraguay. She was recognised outside Paraguay as a writer for children. In the same year she published three works with themes involving puppets El titiritero (The Puppeteer), La hojita de papel (The Little Sheet of Paper) and El vigilante y el ladrón (The Guard and the Robber).

She was an advisor to the Department of Higher Education and Cultural Diffusion of the Ministry of Education and Worship.

Thompson died on 10 December 2003 in Asunción.

== Works include ==
- The Heroic Dream (1963)
- Song to Sleep a Rose (1964)
- Guarambaré (1965)
- Letters to the Sun Lord (1966)
- El Canto a Oscuras (Song in the Dark)
- El titiritero (The Puppeteer, 1992)
- La hojita de papel (The Little Sheet of Paper, 1992)
- El vigilante y el ladrón (The Guard and the Robber)
- L’Anthologie de la littérature de jeunesse paraguayenne (Anthology of Literature for Young Paraguayans, 1992)

== Private life ==
She married Roberto Thompson Molinas and they had four children, Roberto, Hugo, Jacqueline and Monica. Her ex-husband died a year later; he had married again and had been living with his new wife in the United States for twenty years.
