= José Ricardo Mazó =

Paraguayan poet

- Born: 1927; Pilar, Ñeembucú, Paraguay
- Died: 1987 (aged 59–60); Asunción, Paraguay
- Occupations: Poet, engineer, geologist, translator
- Known for: Member of the Promoción del 50
- Notable work: Briznas: suerte de antología (1982); Introducción a la estética (translation of Georg Wilhelm Friedrich Hegel)

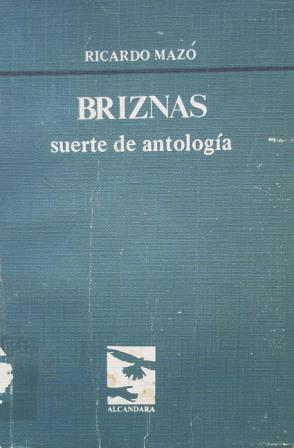
Briznas: suerte de antología (1982)

José Ricardo Mazó (Pilar, 1927- Asunción, 1987), the Paraguayan poet, was born in Pilar, in the department of Ñeembucú. He was a member of the Literary Academy of the College of San José and of the Paraguayan Academia Universitaria. After completing his studies in San José, he studied in the University of Texas at Austin and subsequently worked as an Engineer and Geologist.

He is regarded as one of the Promoción del 50, a group of 1950s poets, mainly from the Academia Universitaria and the Faculty of Philosophy in Asunción who wrote socially engaged poetry during Alfredo Stroessner's dictatorship (1954–1989). His poem, ERA EL MES DE NIZAM..., should perhaps be read in that light.

He translated the lecture notes on Aesthetics that Hegel had distributed in the University of Berlin into Spanish as Introducción a la Estética de G.W:F. Hegel.

== Poetic work ==
Briznas: suerte de antología (Scraps: A kind of Anthology), 1982, gathers together 73 poems written between the years 1940 and 1980. The book is organised into five parts:

1. First poems;
2. Empty hours;
3. Return;
4. The second solitude;
5. Open bastion.

Solitude, absence, nostalgia, distance, boredom ... as well as a constant search for the self, a recurrent encounter with time, and fixation on an unceasing memory, are the dominant motifs of his poetry. In several of his poems, the poetic voice alludes to a mysterious angel.

== Bibliography ==
- Briznas: suerte de antología, Asunción: Perch, 1982. (Poetry, 2). 111 pp.
- Poesía 1, Asunción: Academia Universitaria, 1953. [a collaboration.]
- Introducción a la estética / Georg Wihelm Friedrich Hegel, Ricardo Mazó (trans), Barcelona : Península, (1971, 2001), ISBN 84-8307-415-X
