= Renée Ferrer de Arréllaga =

Paraguayan poet and novelist

- Born: Renée Ferrer Alfaro; May 19, 1944 (age 82); Asunción
- Citizenship: Paraguayan
- Education: Universidad Nacional de Asunción
- Writing career
- Language: Spanish
- Notable awards: Paraguay National Prize for Literature (2010); UNESCO prize and Buenos Aires International Book Fair, for her work Desde el encendido corazón del monte (2014); Little Cervantes Prize Recognisement (2024)

Renée Ferrer de Arréllaga (born Renée Ferrer Alfaro (Note: In this Spanish name, the first or paternal surname is Ferrer and the second or maternal family name is Alfaro.), 19 May 1944) is a contemporary Paraguayan poet and novelist. She is Secretary General of the Board of Governors of the twenty-member Academia Paraguaya de la Lengua Española. Her novel Los nudos del silencio (The knots of silence) has been translated into French, Italian, and English. On 16 December 2011, Ferrer was awarded Paraguay's National Prize for Literature by President Fernando Lugo. She is married with four children.

| From: Sobreviviente |
| | El eco de los pájaros | The echo of the birds |
| | se ha vuelto ceniciento. | has turned the colour of ash. |
| | De los árboles cuelga la amargura del duelo; | From the trees hangs the bitterness of the duel; |
| | y en la trémula línea del silencio, | and in the flickering line of the silence, |
| | calado de abandono, | fret with abandonment, |
| | asumo | I assume |
| | la soledad sin término. | unending solitude. |

== Works by Ferrer ==
- Poetistas del Paraguay (Voces de hoy), Miguel Ángel Fernández, Renée Ferrer de Arréllaga, ISBN 84-7839-096-0
- Entre el ropero y el tren, Asuncion, Ediciones Alta Voz, 2004
- Itinerario del deseo (Itinerary of desire), translated by Betsy Partyka, Ediciones Alta Voz, 2002
- La colección de relojes, Asuncion, Arandura, 2001
- Renee Ferrer : poesia completa hasta el ano 2000, Asuncion, Paraguay : Arandura Editorial, 2000
- El ocaso del milenio, Asuncion, Paraguay : Ediciones y Arte S.R.L., 1999
- Vagos sin tierra, Asuncion, Expolibro, 1999
- Viaje a destiempo, Universidad Católica Nuestra Señora de la Asunción; Biblioteca de Estudios Paraguayos, 1989
- De la eternidad y otros delirios, Asuncion, Intercontinental Editora, 1997
- El resplandor y las sombras, Asuncion, Arandura Editorial, 1996
- Itinerario del deseo, Asuncion, Arandura Editorial, 1995
- Desde el encendido corazón del monte, Asuncion, Arandura Editorial, 1994
- Narrativa paraguaya actual : dos vertientes, Encuentros, no.4 (March 1994), pp. 1–16
- Por el ojo de la cerradura, Asuncion, Arandura Editorial, 1993
- El Acantilado y el mar, Asuncion, Arandura Editorial, 1992
- Los nudos del silencio, Asuncion, Arte Nuevo Editores, 1988
- Sobreviviente, Editiones Torremozas, Madrid, 1988, ISBN 84-86072-76-X
- Nocturnos, Asuncion, Editorial Arte Nuevo, 1987
- La mariposa azul y otros cuentos, Asuncion, Ediciones IDAP, Ediciones Mediterráneo, 1987
- La Seca y otros cuentos, Asuncion, El Lector, 1986
- Campo y cielo, Asuncion, Ediciones Mediterráneo, 1985
- Peregrino de la eternidad, Asuncion, Alcándara Editora, 1985
- Desde el Cañadón de la memoria, Hamburg, Imprenta Paul Molnar, 1984
- Cascarita de nuez, Asuncion, Talleres de Artes Gráficas Zamphirópolos, 1978
- Voces sin Réplica, Renée Ferrer Alfaro, Asuncion, 1967
- Hay surcos que no se llenan, Renée Ferrer Alfaro, Asuncion, Editorial El Arte, 1965
- La expansión colonizadora y la fundación de Concepción

== Works about Ferrer ==
- Las andanzas de un anhelo / Renee Ferrer, Angeles Molto Moreno, Asuncion, Criterio Ediciones, 2003
- Reneé Ferrer. Los muros del silencio, in Narradoras paraguayas, an anthology edited by José Vicente Peiró, Guido Rodríguez Alcalá, Asuncion, Expolibro, 1999
- Desmenuzando cuentos, de Renée Ferrer, by Delfina Acosta. Asuncion, Arandura Editorial, 2002.
- La temática femenina en antología de cuentos de Renée Ferrer, by José Antonio Alonso Navarro.
- Renée Ferrer. In Reflexiones, ensayos sobre escritoras hispanoamericanas, Ed: Dr. Priscilla Gac-Artigas.
