= Rubén Bareiro Saguier =

Paraguayan writer, poet and diplomat

- Born: January 22, 1930; Villeta, Paraguay
- Died: March 25, 2014 (aged 84); Asunción, Paraguay
- Occupations: Writer, poet, diplomat
- Awards: National Prize for Literature (2005)

Rubén Bareiro Saguier (January 22, 1930 – March 25, 2014) was a Paraguayan writer, poet, and diplomat.

== Early life ==
Rubén Bareiro Saguier was born and grew up in Villeta, Paraguay. At the age of 11, he learned of the injustice of living in an authoritarian regime when the police, after looking for his father and failing to find him, took the young Rubén and imprisoned him in the town's police station.

In 1947, Bareiro Saguier received his school baccalaureate and began studying literature at the Universidad Nacional de Asunción. He stood out as a student leader, something which cost him further imprisonment. He received a bachelor's degree in literature in 1957. In 1962 he received a grant to study at the Universidad Paúl Valéry-Montpellier III, for which purpose he moved to France.

== Career ==
Bareiro Saguier began his literary career writing poems. In 1964 he published his first book, Biografía de ausente (Biography of an Absentee). In France, he worked as an assistant and Spanish teacher at the University of Paris, and then as a professor of Hispanic American literature and Guaraní language at the University of Vincennes. He was also part of the National Center of Scientific Investigation in Paris.

With the publication of Ojo por diente in 1971, he received the Cuban prize "Casa de las Américas". Because of this prize, the following year on one of his numerous visits to Paraguay he was arrested and locked up for a month and a half in the infamous Department of Investigations, at the center of the repression under the regime of Alfredo Stroessner, accused of promoting "rebellious bustle". Immediately intellectuals from around the world mobilized to demand Bareiro Seguier's liberation, including individuals such as Jean-Paul Sartre, Gabriel García Márquez, Simone de Beauvoir and Fernando Savater. Finally, he was released and expelled from the country, sentenced to an exile which lasted until the fall of the dictatorship in 1989.

== Later life and death ==
Bareiro Saguier worked as ambassador for Paraguay in France from 1994 to 2003, when he returned to Paraguay.

He received Paraguay's National Prize for Literature in 2005.

He died in hospital in Asunción on March 25, 2014, after several months of poor health following a heart attack.

== Honors and awards ==
- 1950: First prize, Concurso de Cuentos – Revista Panorama, Asunción
- 1952: First prize, Concurso Ateneo Paraguayo, Asunción
- 1954: First prize, Concurso de Cuentos – Revista Panorama, Asunción
- 1970: Special mention, Concurso de poesía Latinoamericana – Revista Imagen Caracas
- 1972: Casa de las Américas Prize for his book Ojo de diente
- 2005: National Prize for Literature

== Publications ==
- Cuento y Novela, in collaboration with Manuel Arguello. Paraguay nation of métis.
- Biografía de ausente (1964), poetry with illustrations by Carlos Colombino
- Misa por un continente, with music by Francisco Marín, recorded by Barclay.
- Ojo por diente (1971), story. Pacte de sang (translation of “Ojo por diente” made by A. M. Metailié)
- A la víbora de la mar (1977), poetry with illustrations by Carlos Colombino. Second edition with introduction by Augusto Roa Bastos
- Literatura Guaraní del Paraguay (1980), essay, in collaboration with Jacqueline Baltran
- Antología Personal de Augusto Roa Bastos
- Cultura y Sociedad en América Latina
- Antología de la novela hispano-americana, in collaboration with Oliver de León
- Estancias, errancias, querencias (1985), poetry
- El séptimo pétalo del viento (1984), story with prologue and interview by Augusto Roa Bastos
  - (in German) single story: Wie Onkel Emilio das ewige Leben erlangte. Transl. José Antonio Friedl Zapata. In: Ein neuer Name, ein fremdes Gesicht. 26 Erzählungen aus Lateinamerika. Luchterhand. Neuwied 1987, pp 212–228
- Las dictaduras en América Latina, introduction and announcement of slides
- Antología poética, selected by Daniel Leyva
- Augusto Roa Bastos: semana de autor (1986), essay
- Augusto Roa Bastos, caída y resurrecciones de un pueblo (1989), essay
- Antología de la poesía paraguaya del siglo XX (1990), anthology in collaboration with Carlos Villagra Marsal
- Antología de la novela latino-americana, in collaboration with Oliver de León
- De nuestras lenguas y otros discursos
- Tentaciónde la utopía - La República de los Jesuitas en el Paraguay, in collaboration with Jean Paul Duviels
- De la literature guaraní a la Literature paraguaya: Un proceso colonial, PhD thesis in literature, with Very Honorable mention
- La América hispánica en el siglo XX
- Cuentos de las dos orillas
- Antología poética (bilingual)
- De cómo el tío Emilio ganó la vida perdurable, monologues
- Antología de la poesía guaraní y en guaraní del Paraguay, in collaboration with Carlos Villagra Marsal
- Fiesta patronal, with photographs by Fernando Allen
- El río, la vida, with photographs by Fernando Allen
