= Puerto Pinasco, Paraguay =

Coordinates: 22°43′S 57°50′W

Puerto Pinasco is a town located in the Presidente Hayes Department, of Paraguay.
