= Efrén Echeverría =

Paraguayan guitarist, composer and compiler (1932–2018)

Efren Echeverria
- Born: 4 March 1932; Lima, Paraguay
- Died: 19 June 2018 (aged 86) Palma Loma, Paraguay
- Occupation: Guitarist

Efren Echeverria (4 March 1932 – 19 June 2018) was a Paraguayan guitarist, composer and compiler.

== Early life ==
Echeverria's neighbor, Eusebio Cantero taught him to play his first chords on the guitar when he was nine years old. With Cantero, Echeverria learned a repertoire of Paraguayan folk music. By the time he became a teenager, Echeverria acquired his own guitar and often played in acts entertaining at "Musiqueada" (musical parties) in Paraguay.

Soon Echeverria took over the serenades of the place, always pushing the guitar and sometimes up the violin or accordion with buttons. His repertoire covered everything that the public from the area could appreciate.

== Career ==
Echeverria understood that music alone could not be his sole source of subsistence, and was employed as a forestry worker. Echeverria was working in the area of Curuguaty by the year 1950. By 1960, he settled in the city of Asunción, capital of Paraguay.

In the 1970s, he was a participant in the emerging music festivals and television. At that time, he began to arouse interest in the Asunción for his original compositions and his unique playing style.

Near the truck that Echeverria adopted as the first refuge in Asunción, lived the musician Ramon Vargas Colman, who by then was temporarily separated from his musical partner Andres Saldivar Basin. Echeverria became part of the group of Vargas Colmán with bandleader Edmundo Ros and others. In parallel, he presented a radio program on Radio Ñandutí. Some time later, he accompanied the musician Severo Nunez Benitez and his group "Los Jilgeros" who made radio programs for Radio Paraguay, Chaco Boreal Station and the National Radio. The group toured in Argentina and Brazil.

It was at the Pettengil family home, in the city of Itaguaí, where he met the musician and composer Eladio Martinez "El Grande", with whom he would tour at festivals and make television appearances.

== Works ==
The composer created many works for guitar. Some recreate sounds of animals with great fidelity. These include:

- "Ruguasu Kokoro."
- "Yaguai Kare."
- "Itaverá."
- "Guata yeruti."
- "Taita Jose."
- "Belénpe guare."
- "Vaka ra'y chapelo", among others.

The musician joined numerous folk groups, although it is now recognized and admired for his solo interpretation of the Paraguayan folk music.

He has compiled numerous unpublished compositions. Elias has recorded discs so far four long-term discs and included them in many of these popular grounds next to the popular creations: Yagua'í care and Ryguazú Cocore.

In the 1970s was when he made many music festivals and on television so that more was to tap and ripping guitar.

== Bibliography ==
- Kamba'i Echeverria
- Viva Paraguay
