= Italian Paraguayans =

Paraguayan citizens of Italian descent

Italo-paraguaiani (Italian) Ítalo-paraguayos (Spanish) Itália-paraguaiguakuéra (Guarani)
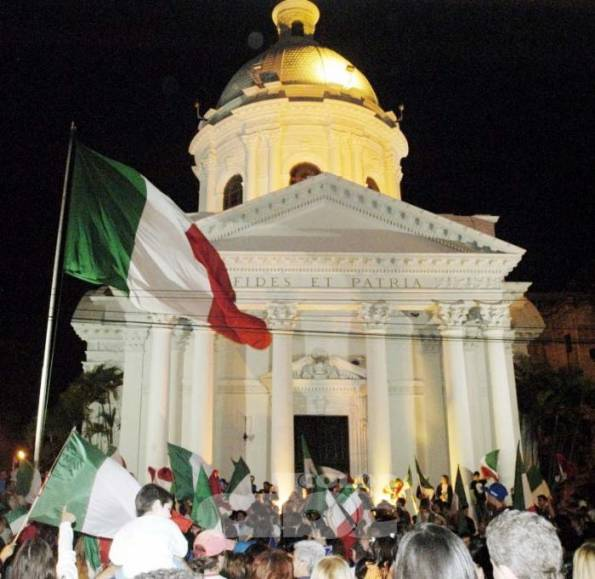
- Italian Paraguayans in front of the National Pantheon of the Heroes, which was designed by Italian Paraguayan architect Alejandro Ravizza, in Asunción

Total population
- c. 13,000 (by birth) c. 3,000,000 (by ancestry, 37%-40% of the total Paraguayan population)

Regions with significant populations
- Asunción

Languages
- Paraguayan Spanish · Italian and Italian dialects · Guarani

Religion
- Christianity (mostly Roman Catholic)

Related ethnic groups
- Italians, Italian Americans, Italian Argentines, Italian Bolivians, Italian Brazilians, Italian Canadians, Italian Chileans, Italian Colombians, Italian Costa Ricans, Italian Cubans, Italian Dominicans, Italian Ecuadorians, Italian Guatemalans, Italian Haitians, Italian Hondurans, Italian Mexicans, Italian Panamanians, Italian Peruvians, Italian Puerto Ricans, Italian Salvadorans, Italian Uruguayans, Italian Venezuelans

Italian Paraguayans (Italian: italo-paraguaiani; Spanish: ítalo-paraguayos; Guarani: itália-paraguaiguakuéra) are one of the most prominent ethnic group in Paraguay, consisting of Paraguayan-born citizens who are fully or partially of Italian descent, whose ancestors were Italians who emigrated to Paraguay during the Italian diaspora, or Italian-born people in Paraguay. Italian immigration to Paraguay has been one of the largest migration flows this South American country has received.

Italians in Paraguay are the second-largest immigrant group in the country after the Spaniards. The Italian embassy calculates that nearly 40% of the Paraguayans have recent and distant Italian roots: about 3,000,000 Paraguayans are descendants of Italian emigrants to Paraguay. Over the years, many descendants of Italian immigrants came to occupy important positions in the public life of the country, such as the presidency of the republic, the vice-presidency, local administrations and congress.

== History ==
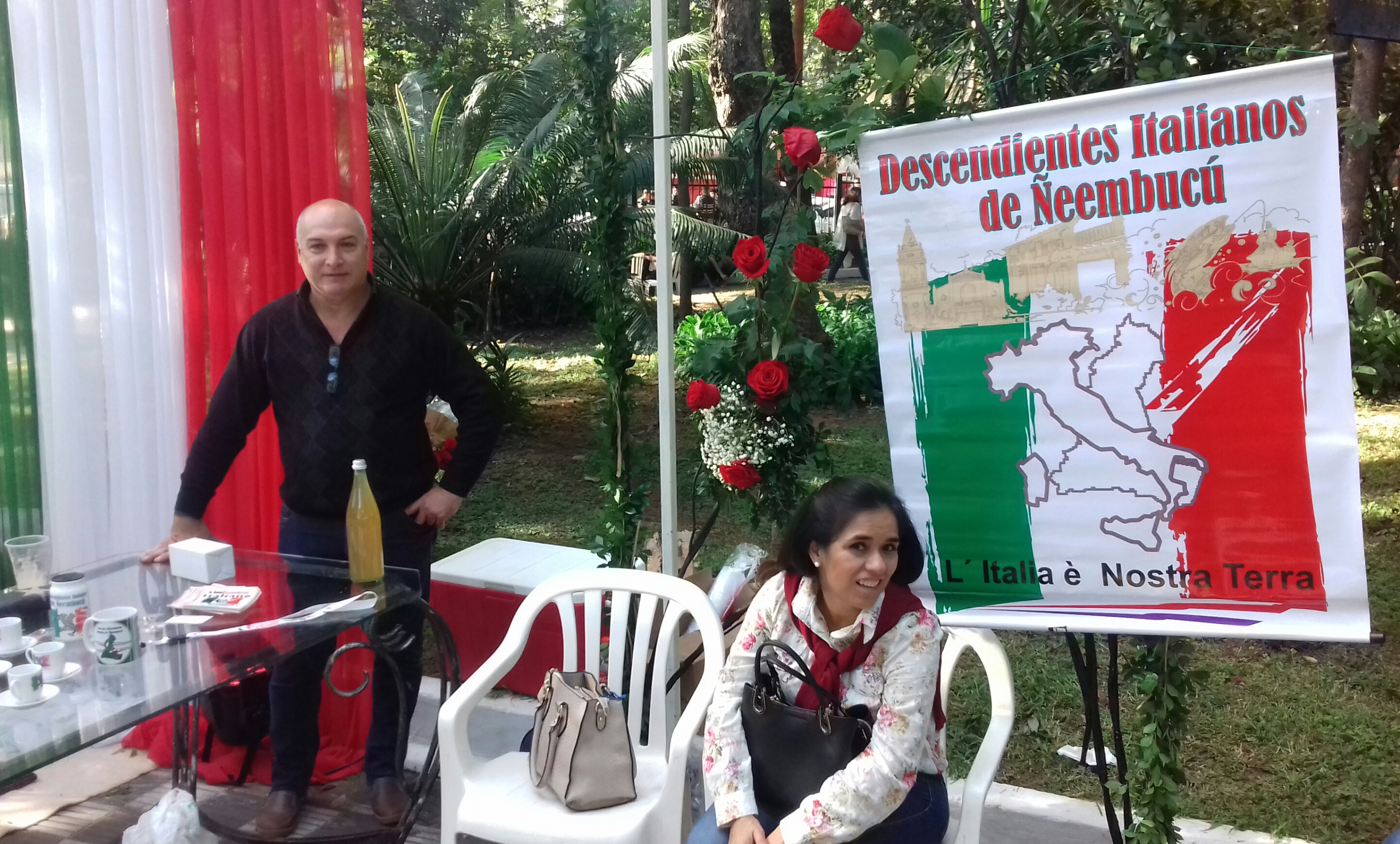
Members of the Ñeembucú Italian Descendants Association during the 3rd edition of the Festa Italiana ("Italian Feast") in Asunción (2019)

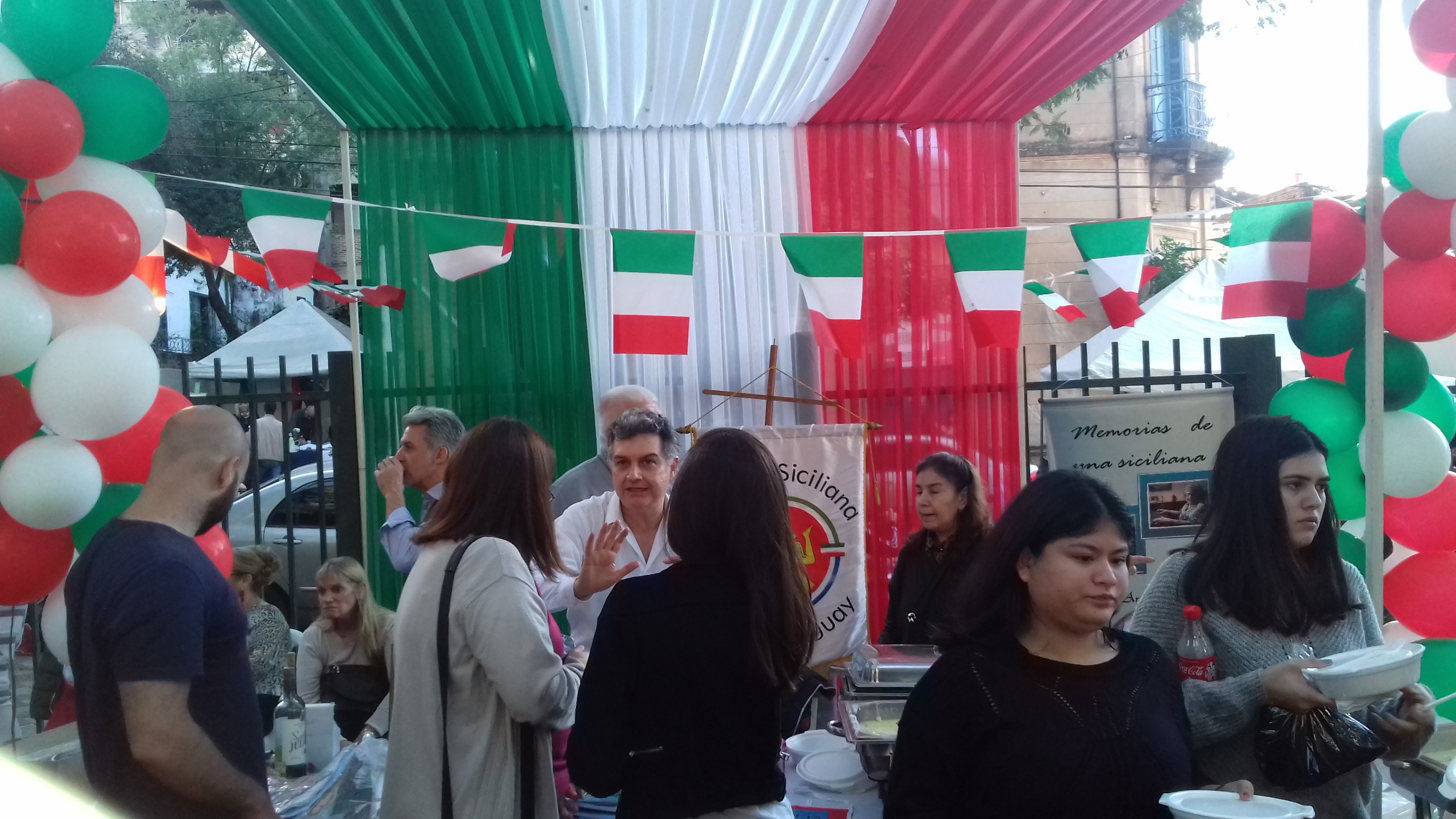
Italo Paraguayans originally from Sicily during the 3rd edition of the Festa Italiana in Asunción (2019)

During colonial centuries, only a few Italians went to Paraguay; most were catholic missionaries, but some merchants and a few soldiers under Spanish rule also migrated to the country.

The War of the Triple Alliance (1865–70) was the bloodiest in Latin American history. The war was a disaster for Paraguay, which lost two-thirds of the adult male population. Paraguay's population fell from about 600,000 to about 250,000. For the next 50 years, Paraguay stagnated economically. The male population was replaced by an influx of immigrants from Italy, Spain, Germany, and Argentina. The census of 1899 showed a population of about 630,000 of whom nearly 100,000 were Indians. The foreign population in 1895 numbered 5,000 Argentines, 3,500 Italians, 1,500 Spaniards, 1,250 Germans, 800 French, 600 Brazilians, and 1000 Swiss, Austrians, English, and other nationalities.

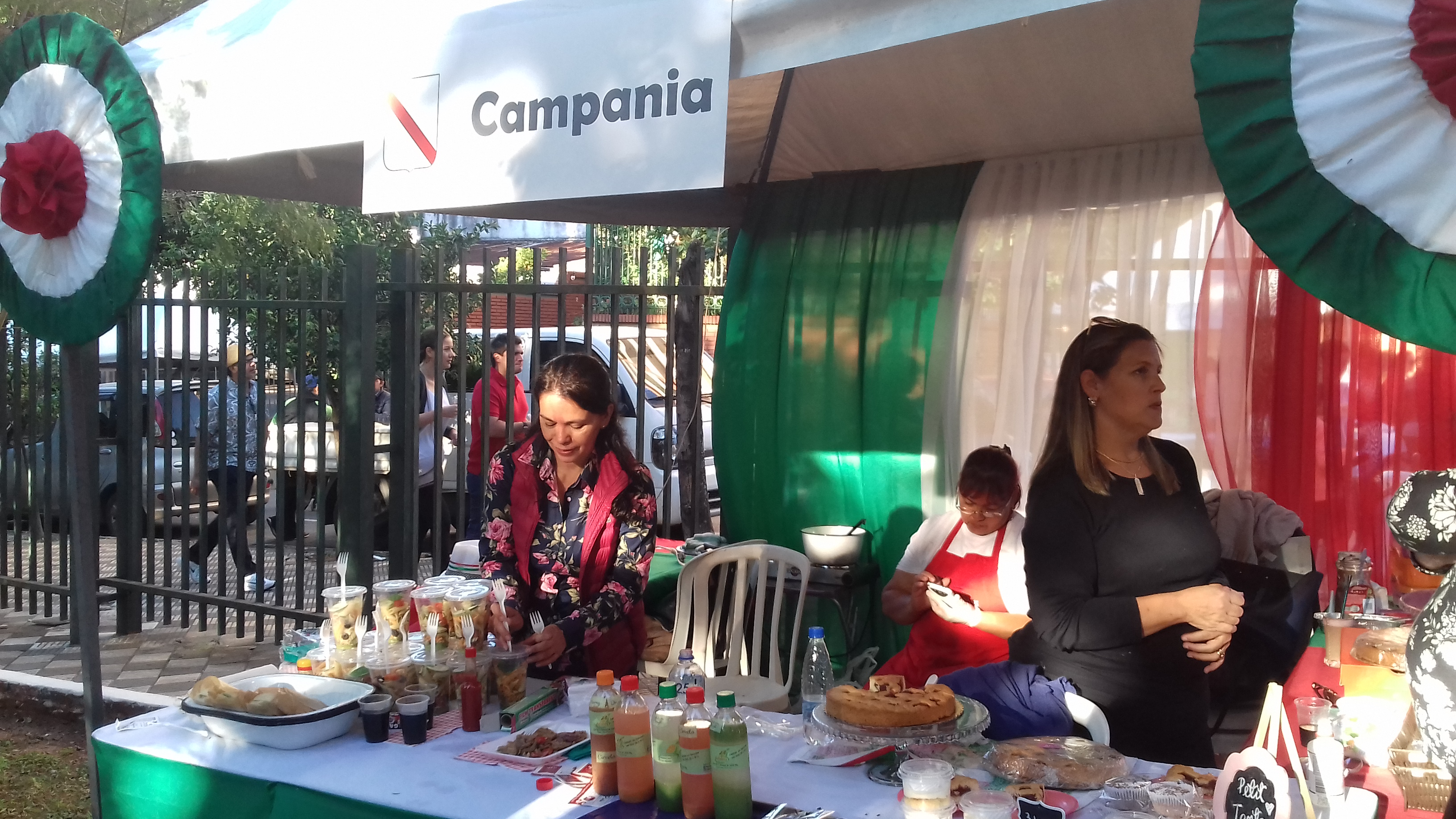
Italo Paraguayans originally from Campania during the 3rd edition of the Festa Italiana in Asunción (2019)

At the end of the 19th century, numerous families of Italian immigrants arrived, most of Sicilian origin, who founded the Trinacria neighborhood ("Trinacria" is one of the ancient names of Sicily), in the Villa del Rosario district. Later they settled in the capital's quarters of General Díaz and Tacumbú. The Italians were a relatively huge community of nearly 6,000 people at the beginning of the 20th century, concentrated in the capital and the surrounding areas. This group of immigrants, largely made up of workers, architects, engineers and less by professionals in other fields, exercised great influence, especially on growth and urban development in Asunción and in the maintenance of the Paraguayan rail system. They created even small cities, like "Nuova Italia".

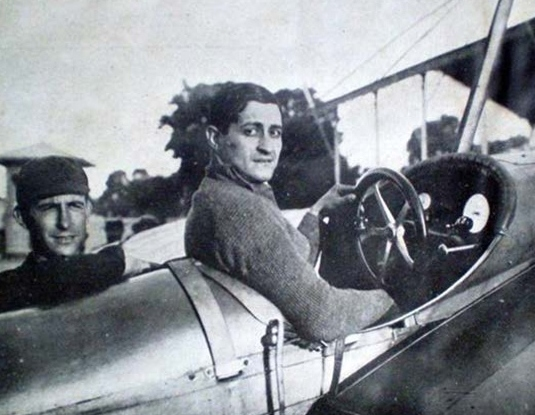
The Italian Paraguayan Silvio Pettirossi, pioneer of Paraguayan and world aviation

One of the most famous in the early 20th century was Silvio Pettirossi, who was a Paraguayan airplane pilot and aviation pioneer. In December 1914, he founded the Aeroclub de Paraguay and was named its president. Actually Asunción's Silvio Pettirossi International Airport, three soccer clubs, the "Airborne Brigade of the Paraguayan Air Force", a Paraguayan Air Force Base in Luque, an avenue in Asunción and the "Paraguayan Institute of Aviation History" are named after him.

During the Chaco War, the Italians actively participated against Bolivia and some Italian aviators, recently immigrated from Italy, were instrumental in the final victory of Paraguay. Various Presidents of Paraguay are Italo-paraguayans such as José Patricio Guggiari, Andrés Rodríguez Pedotti, Juan Carlos Wasmosy Monti and Luis Ángel González Macchi. Even some misses of Paraguay are descendants of Italians, like Fiorella Migliore.

40 percent of Paraguayans are descendants from the Italian immigrants. Italians were 15% of the male population in Paraguay in 1875, after the Chaco War, but grew considerable in numbers with their offspring with local women, and now are fully assimilated due to many mixed marriages.

== Migration history ==
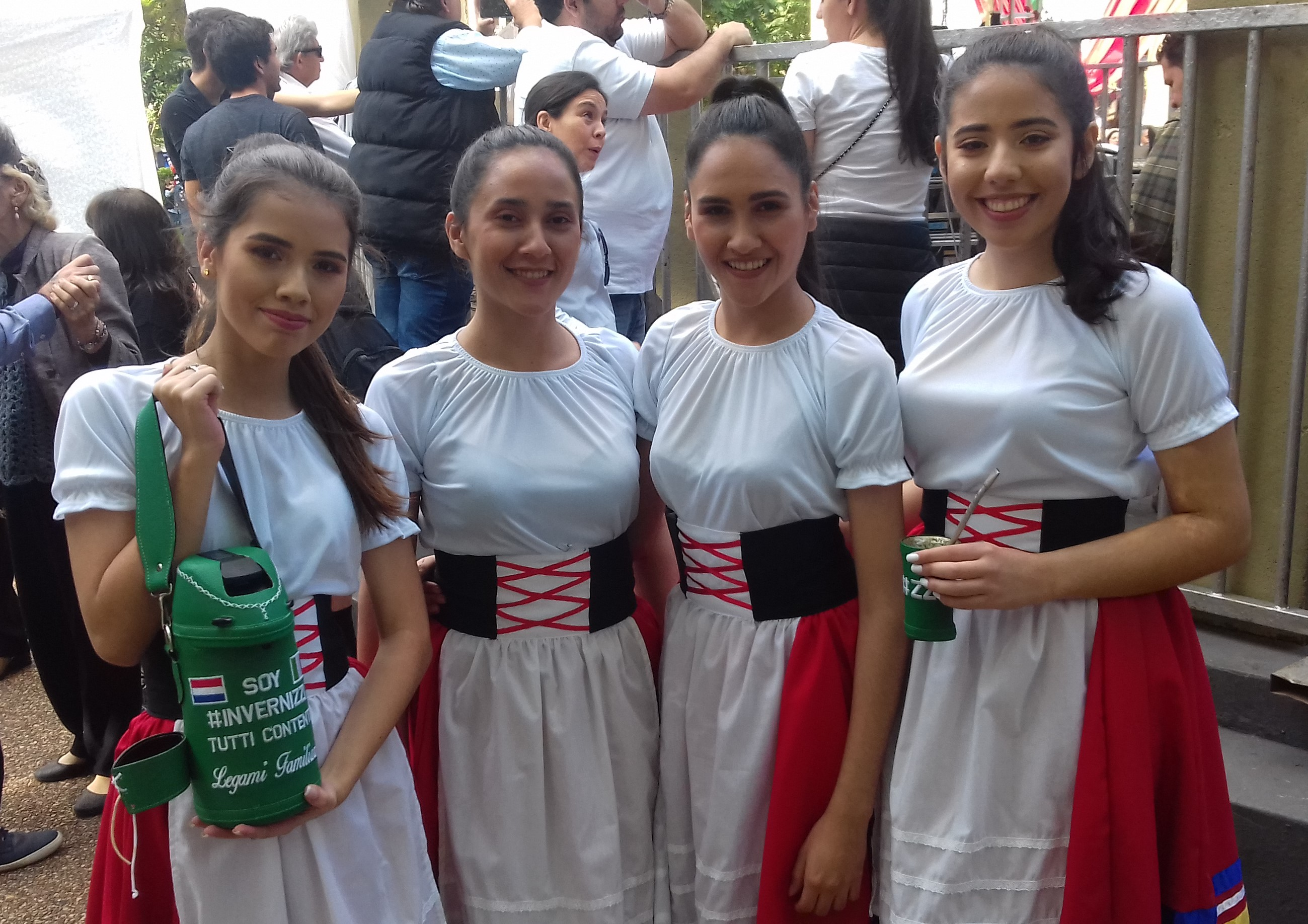
Italo Paraguayan girls with typical Sicilian costumes during the 3rd edition of the Festa Italiana ("Italian Feast") in Asunción (2019)

The number of Italian immigrants in Paraguay was by far the highlight of foreigners who settled in the country in the early postwar years after 1870. During the Paraguayan War, many Italian immigrants enlisted voluntarily rows of then President Mariscal Francisco Solano López.

In the period between 1882 and 1907, Italians were the largest group, exceeding 27% of total foreign arrivals in Paraguay.

After the unification of Italy in 1860, after Garibaldi's battles, began the era of the great migrations that lasted until 1914. This yielded a very extensive migratory movement, between the years 1869–1913, more than 14 million Italians left their country.

However, most of the Italian immigrants came mainly from Lombardy (especially from Bergamo) and the rest of northern Italy, comprising individuals who arrived in Paraguay on their own and facing its risks.

This group of immigrants, largely made up of workers, architects, engineers and less by professionals in other fields, exercised great influence, especially on growth and urban development in Asunción and in the maintenance of the Paraguayan rail system.

== Culture ==
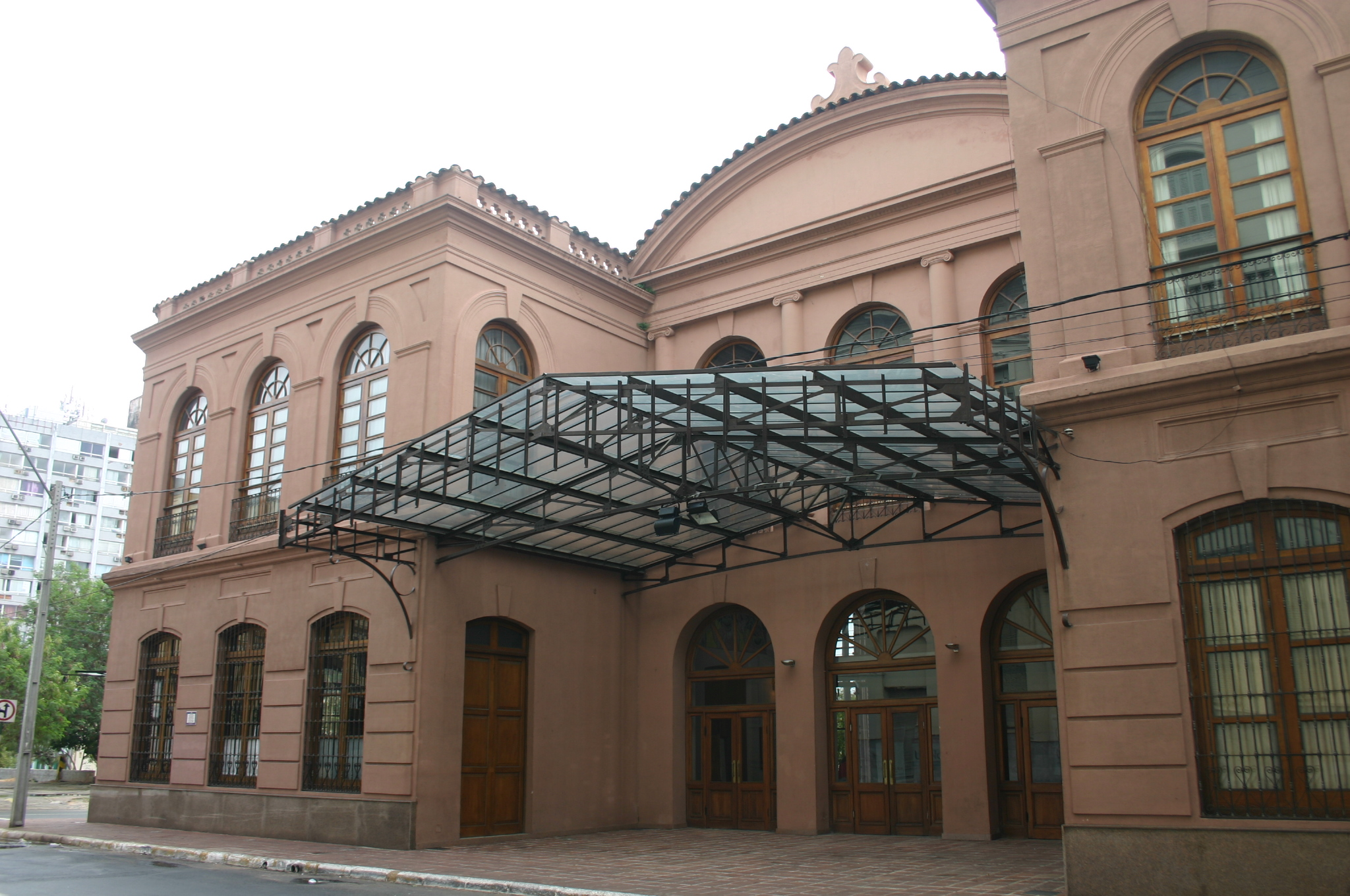
The Municipal Theater of Asunción is named after the Italian Paraguayan Ignacio Alberto Pane

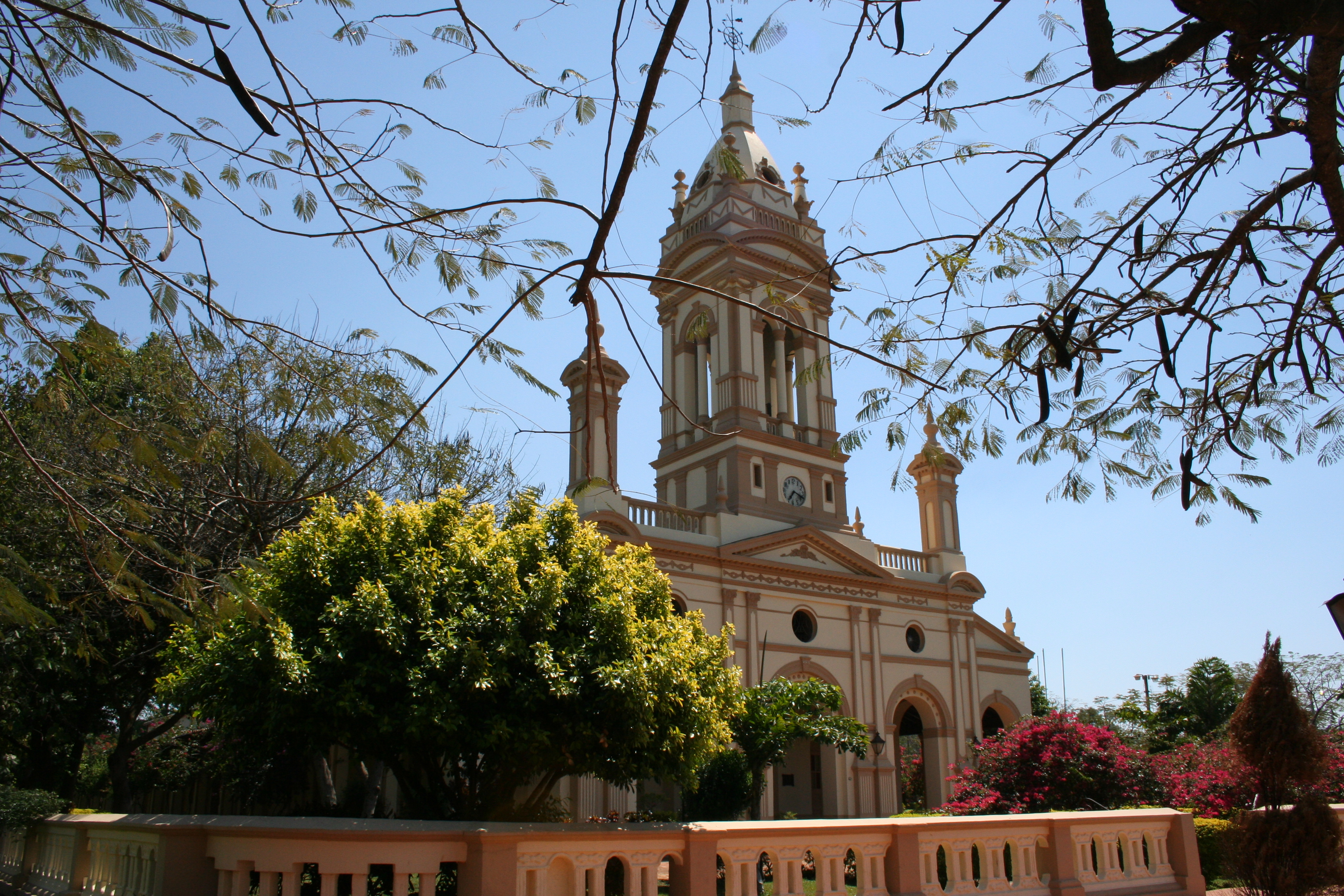
Façade of the Virgen del Rosario parish church in Itauguá, the work of the Italian-Paraguayan builder David Broggini

Starting with the Italian explorer Sebastian Cabot, in 1528, Italians in Paraguay have had a significant importance in the birth of modern Paraguay. Responsible for much of Paraguay's cultural heritage, both tangible and intangible, their sphere of influence has cut through nearly every aspect of society. Thanks to the Italians, Paraguayan cities acquired their current character through the settlement of those typical activities of a city: bakeries, shoe shops, tailors, pasta shops, liquor stores, among others.

=== Architecture ===
The work of Italian engineers and architects transformed the colonial architecture of Paraguay, giving it an Italianate character, which is still visible today. 19th century were the architects Alejandro Ravizza and Juan Colombo, as well as the builders Giacomo Colombino and José Pelozzi. The builder David Broggini and the altar painter César Pizzoli were involved in the parish churches of Itauguá and Villarrica.

=== Festa Italiana ===
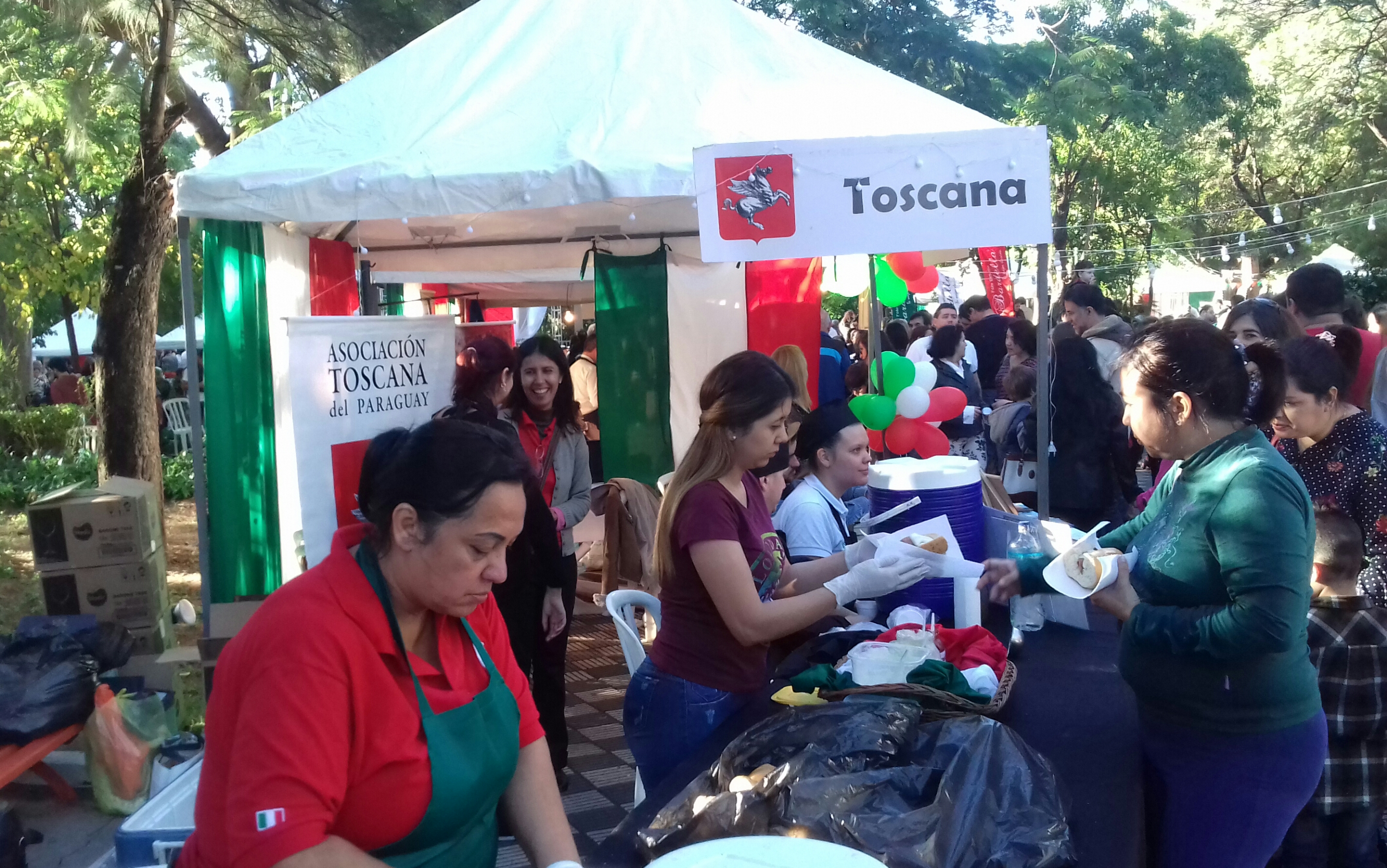
Italo Paraguayans originally from Tuscany during the 3rd edition of the Festa Italiana ("Italian Feast") in Asunción (2019)

Since 2017, the Festa Italiana ("Italian Feast") is an annual festival in the capital of Paraguay, with a huge success of public and commerce merchants. The feast is centered on Italian music and food and wine, and involves Italian cuisine restaurants and bars, as well as Italian Paraguayan associations, each with its own stand.

=== Cuisine ===
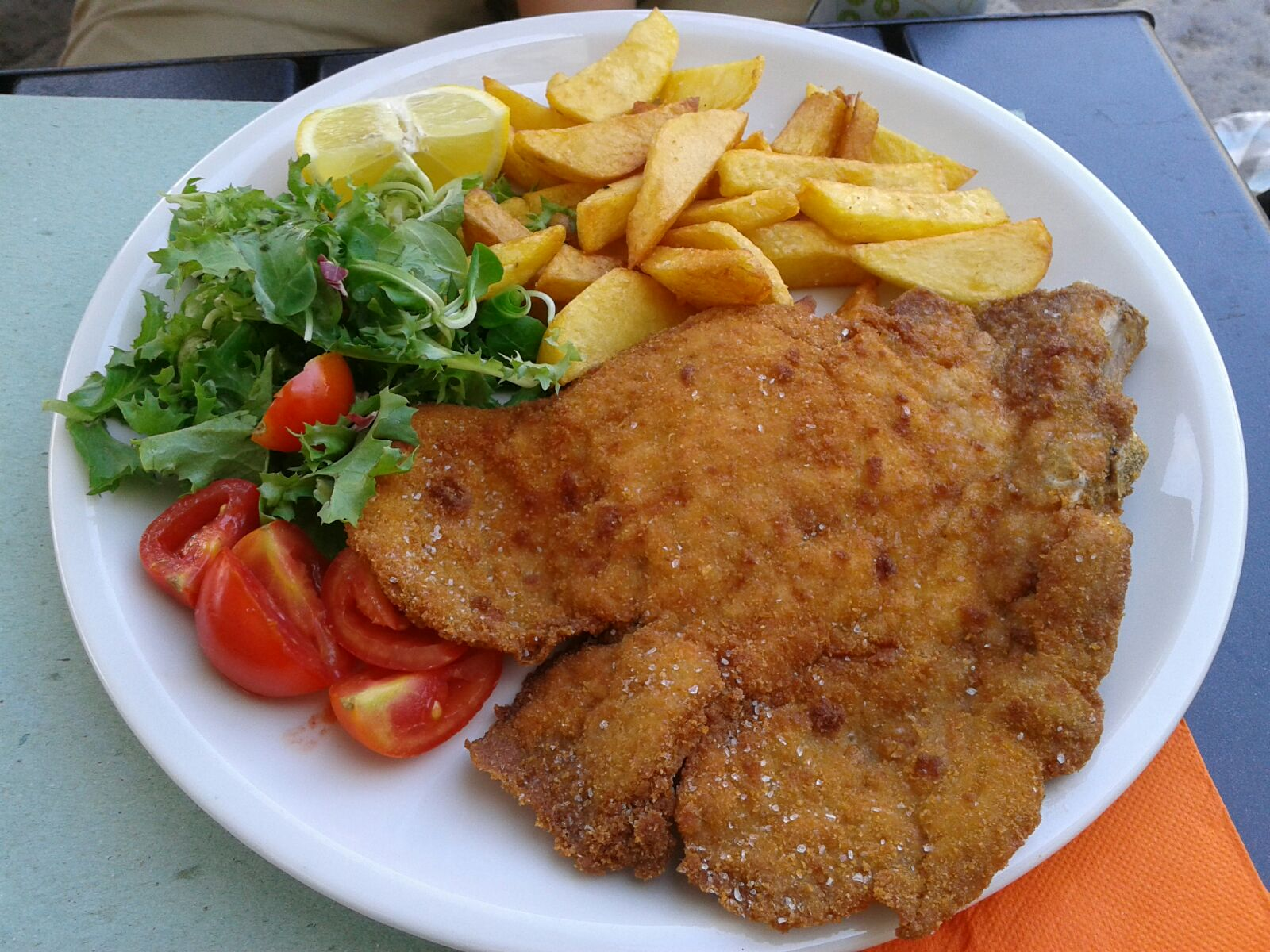
Milanesa

The milanesa was brought to Paraguay by Italian immigrants during the mass emigration that created the Italian diaspora between 1860 and the 1920s. Its name probably reflects an original Milanese preparation, cotoletta alla milanese, which is similar to the Austrian Wiener schnitzel. Panettone, another food of Italian gastronomy brought by Italian immigrants, is also widespread in Paraguay.

The noquis del 29 ("gnocchi of 29") defines the widespread custom in some South American countries of eating a plate of gnocchi, a type of Italian pasta, on the 29th of each month. The custom is widespread especially in the states of the Southern Cone such as Brazil, Argentina, Paraguay, Uruguay; these countries being recipients of a considerable Italian immigration between the end of the 19th century and the beginning of the 20th century. There is a ritual that accompanies lunch with gnocchi, namely putting money under the plate which symbolizes the desire for new gifts. It is also customary to leave a banknote or coin under the plate to attract luck and prosperity to the dinner.

The tradition of serving gnocchi on the 29th of each month stems from a legend based on the story of Saint Pantaleon, a young doctor from Nicomedia who, after converting to Christianity, made a pilgrimage through northern Italy. There Pantaleon practiced miraculous cures for which he was canonized. According to legend, on one occasion when he asked Venetian peasants for bread, they invited him to share their poor table. In gratitude, Pantaleon announced a year of excellent fishing and excellent harvests. That episode occurred on 29 July, and for this reason that day is remembered with a simple meal represented by gnocchi.

=== Agriculture ===
Italian immigrants introduced the cultivation of vegetable varieties to Paraguay, such as tomatoes, locotes, beets, cabbage, among others. Around 1920 at Itauguá, in the Estanzuela company, owned by Italians, strawberries began to be sown, which from that moment on was also produced in Paraguay.

=== Sport ===
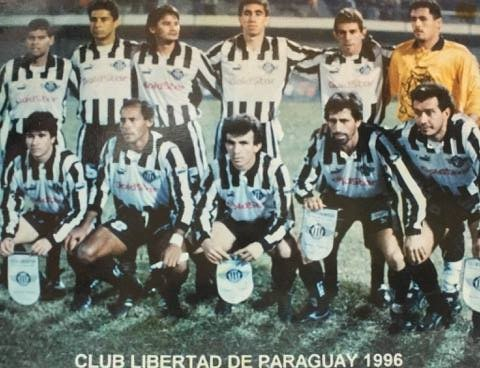
Footballer of Club Libertad in 1996

The Italian community of Asunción has had a great influence on Club Libertad. Precisely, the symbol of the sports club is Don Nicola, a character dressed as a greengrocer carrying a basket of produce from the garden, among which cabbages stand out. Don Nicola, with his broad mustache and checkered cap, represents Italian immigrants who used to cultivate vegetable gardens in their homes. This passionate and mustachioed Italian is nicknamed Gumarelo, a term that will forever identify the fan of Club Libertad.

As for the origin of the name Gumarelo, there are two versions. The first says that it originated from an Italian fictional character, created by the Argentine journalist Antonio Franiecevich in 1919 and 1920, who he called Pascuale Gummarello. Franiecevich himself has stated that he is a big fan of Club Libertad. The second version refers to the fact that the name derives from the surnames of two fans of Italian origin who were very fanatical about the club, Angel Giummarresi and Luis Nuzzarello, whose surnames, fused together, gave shape to the word "Gumarrello", which apparently, according to chronicle of the time, is also a Neapolitan dialect word.

== Actual Italian community ==
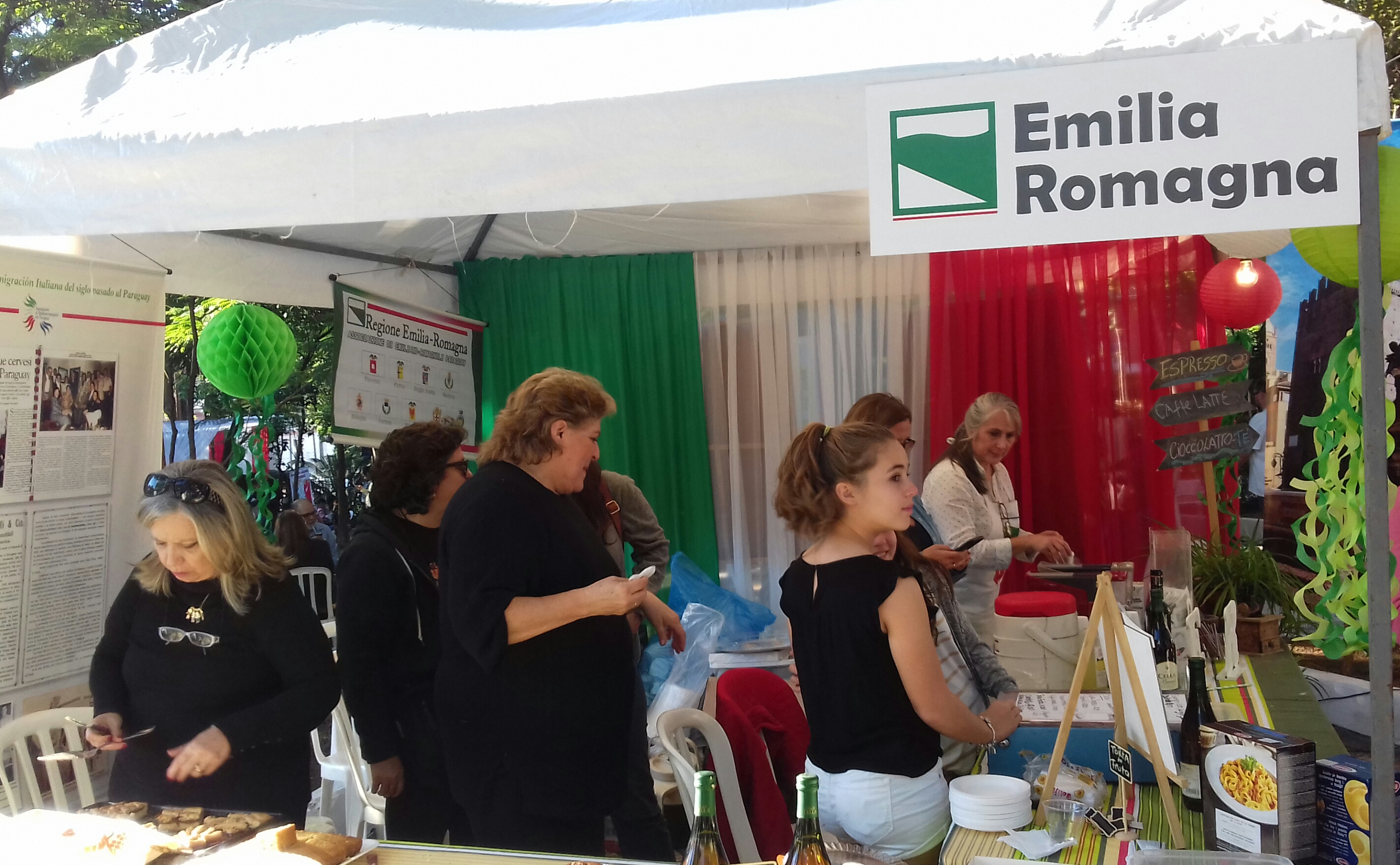
Italo Paraguayans originally from Emilia Romagna during the 3rd edition of the Festa Italiana ("Italian Feast") in Asunción (2019)

It is estimated by academics that about 3,000,000 Paraguayans have Italian ancestry, corresponding to 40% of the total Paraguayan population. Italians are now fully integrated into Paraguayan society, due to the many marriages between Italians and Paraguayan girls (after the massacres in the war of 1870 that left only a few native Paraguayan males). The number of Italian citizens resident in Paraguay in 2019 was about 13,000.

== Institutions ==
One of the institutions founded by Italian immigrants that had particular relevance was the "Società Italiana di Mutuo Soccorso". This body, created on 8 September 1871, had the purpose of assisting Italian citizens who had settled in Paraguay, under the strict sense of solidarity. Currently, in addition to the Società Italiana di Mutuo Soccorso, there are several Italian organizations and associations in Paraguay.

== Notable Italian-Paraguayans ==
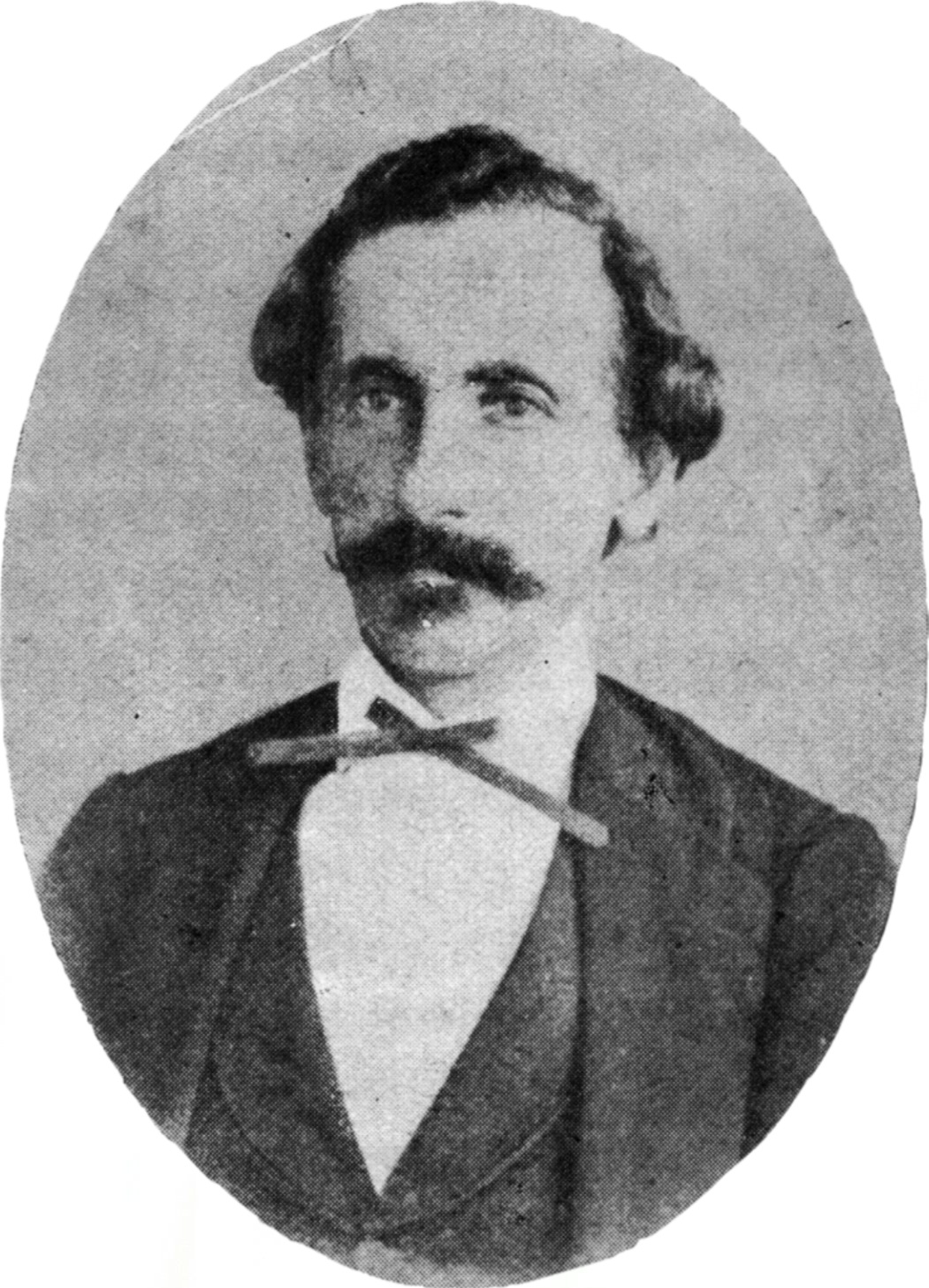
Cirilo Antonio Rivarola, the 4th president of Paraguay in 1870-1871

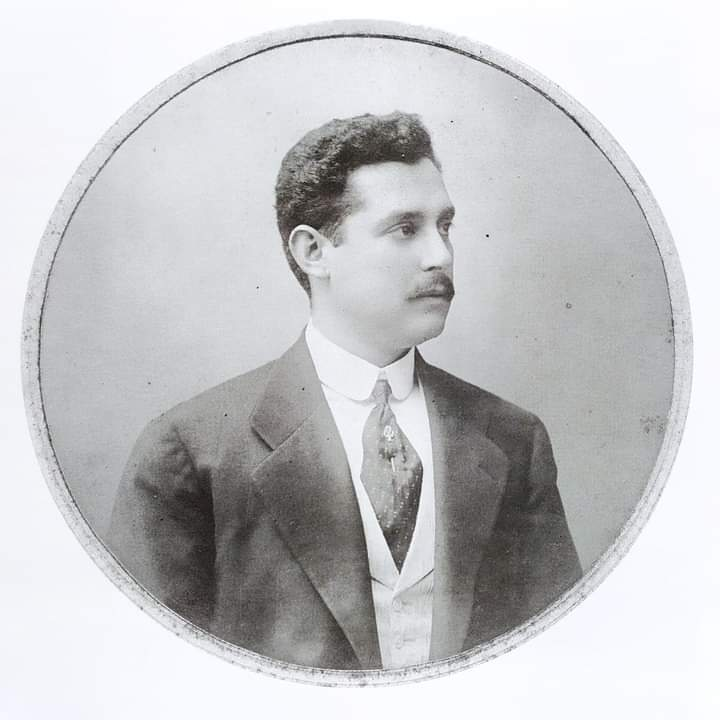
José Patricio Guggiari, the 32nd president of Paraguay in 1928-1931 and in 1932

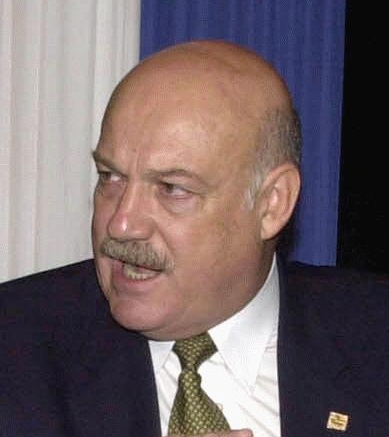
Luis Ángel González Macchi, the 46th president of Paraguay in 1999-2003

- Oberdan Sallustro, Entrepreneur who was kidnapped and assassinated by the Ejército Revolucionario del Pueblo (1915–1972)
- José Patricio Guggiari, President of Paraguay (1928-1931 and 1932)
- Oscar Vicente Scavone, businessman and football executive
- Andrea Pedotti, President of Paraguay (1988–1993)
- Juan Carlos Wasmosy, President of Paraguay (1993–1998)
- Luis Gonzalez Macchi, President of Paraguay (1999–2003)
- Cirilo Antonio Rivarola, provisional President & President of Paraguay (1870–1871)
- Gabriel Casaccia, novelist considered the father of modern Paraguayan literature
- José Bozzano, military engineer and minister of economy
- Giacomo Bertoni, botanist and writer
- Fiorella Migliore, Miss "Italia nel Mondo" 2008
- Gladys Carmagnola, poet and writer
- Víctor Pecci, tennis player
- Silvio Pettirossi, aviation pioneer
- Attila Sallustro, footballer
- Cayetano Ré, footballer
- Guido Boggiani, writer and explorer
- Maneco Galeano, musician
- Antolín Alcaraz, footballer
- Ana María Baiardi, diplomat and politician
- Carlos Mateo Balmelli, politician, former President of the Senate of Paraguay
- Diego Barreto, footballer
- Jorge Battaglia, footballer
- Juan Manuel Battaglia, footballer
- Salvador Breglia, footballer
- Luis Castiglioni, politician, former Vice President of Paraguay
- Otto Miguel Cione, journalist, dramatist and writer
- Pablo Escobar, footballer
- Paola Ferrari, basketball player
- Carlos Filizzola, politician
- Rafael Filizzola, politician
- Jorge Gattini, agronomist and politician
- Gloria del Paraguay, soprano
- Ronald Huth, footballer
- Paola Maltese, actress, presenter and entrepreneur
- Juan Matto, footballer
- Alfredo Mazacotte, footballer
- David Meza, footballer
- Ricardo Migliorisi, painter, costume designer, scenery designer and architect
- Marcelo Pecci, prosecutor
- Ana Camila Pirelli, track and field athlete
- Robert Piris Da Motta, footballer
- Iván Piris, footballer
- Wilson Pittoni, footballer
- Andrea Quattrocchi, actress and ballerina
- Juan Bautista Rivarola Matto, journalist, narrator, essayist and playwright
- Luis Ruffinelli, playwright, journalist and political activist
- Giannina Rufinelli, model and beauty pageant titleholder
- Miguel Pecci Saavedra, playwright, novelist, literary critic and humanist
- Antony Silva, footballer
- Facunda Speratti, activist who participated in the May 1811 revolution
- Ricardo Tavarelli, footballer
- Fabrizio Zanotti, golfer
- Juan Carlos Maneglia, filmmaker and screenwriter
- Carlos Ortellado, actor and presenter
- Marcelo Martinessi, filmmaker and screenwriter

== Gallery ==
The Festa Italiana ("Italian Feast") in Asunción in 2019:

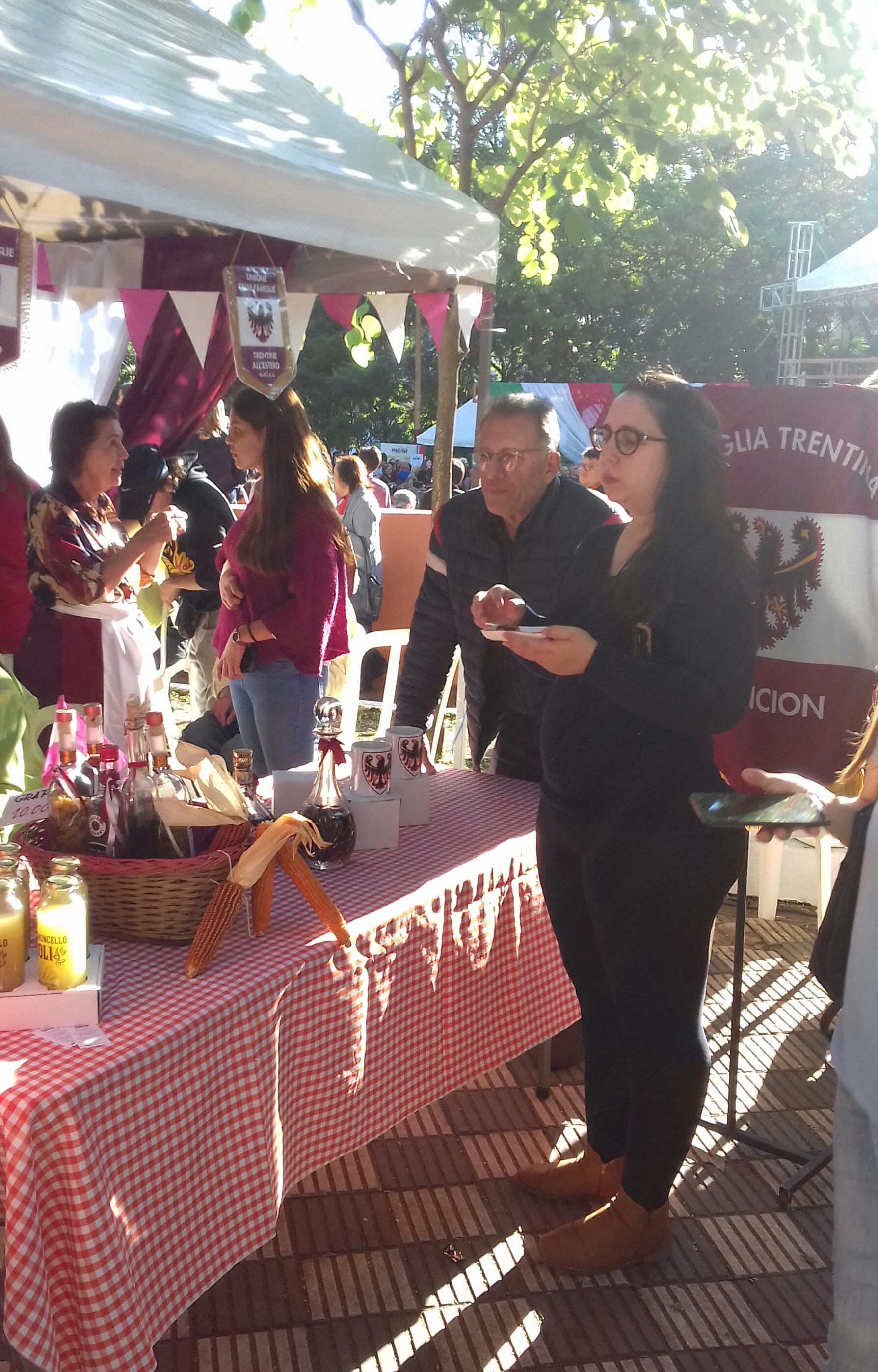

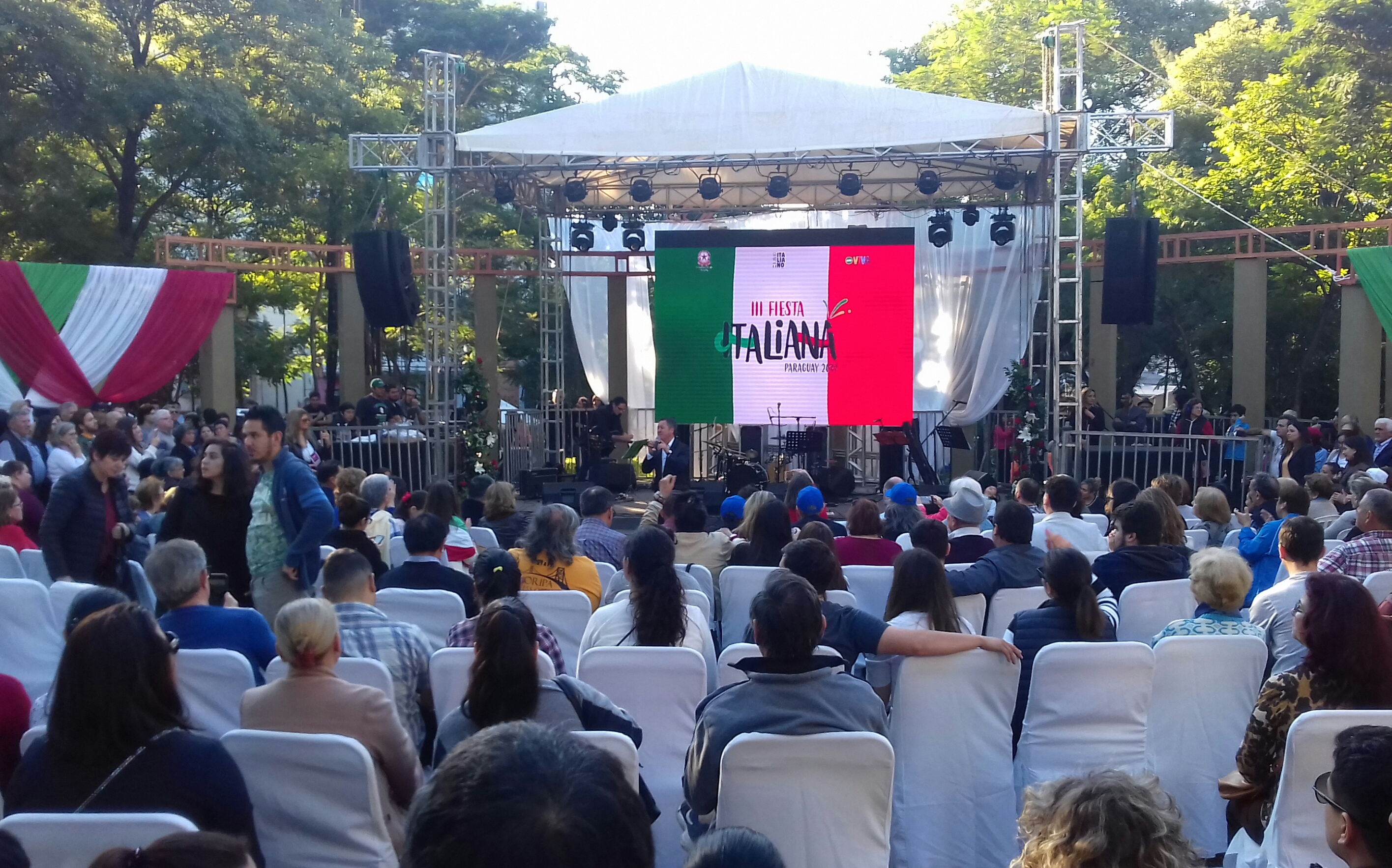

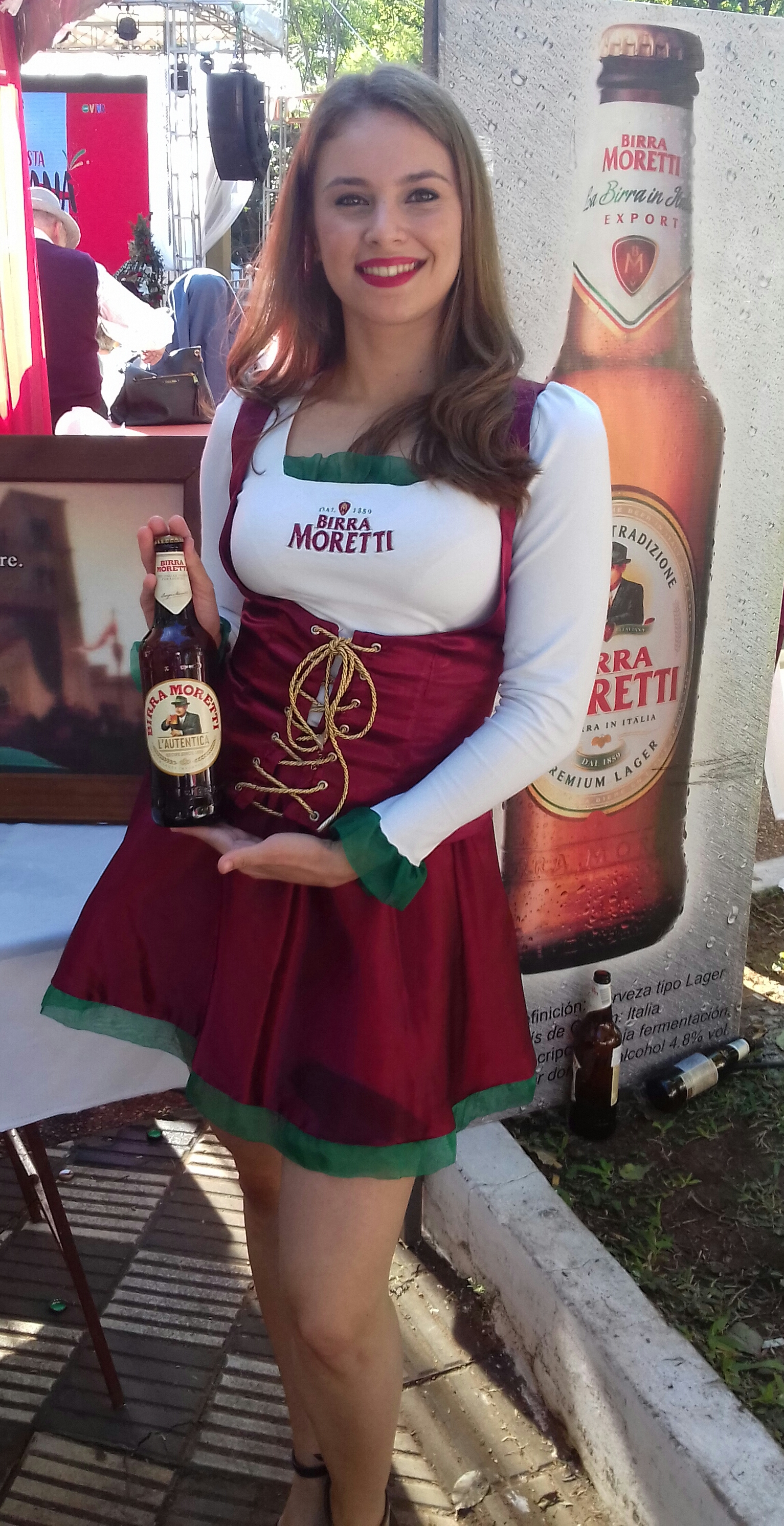

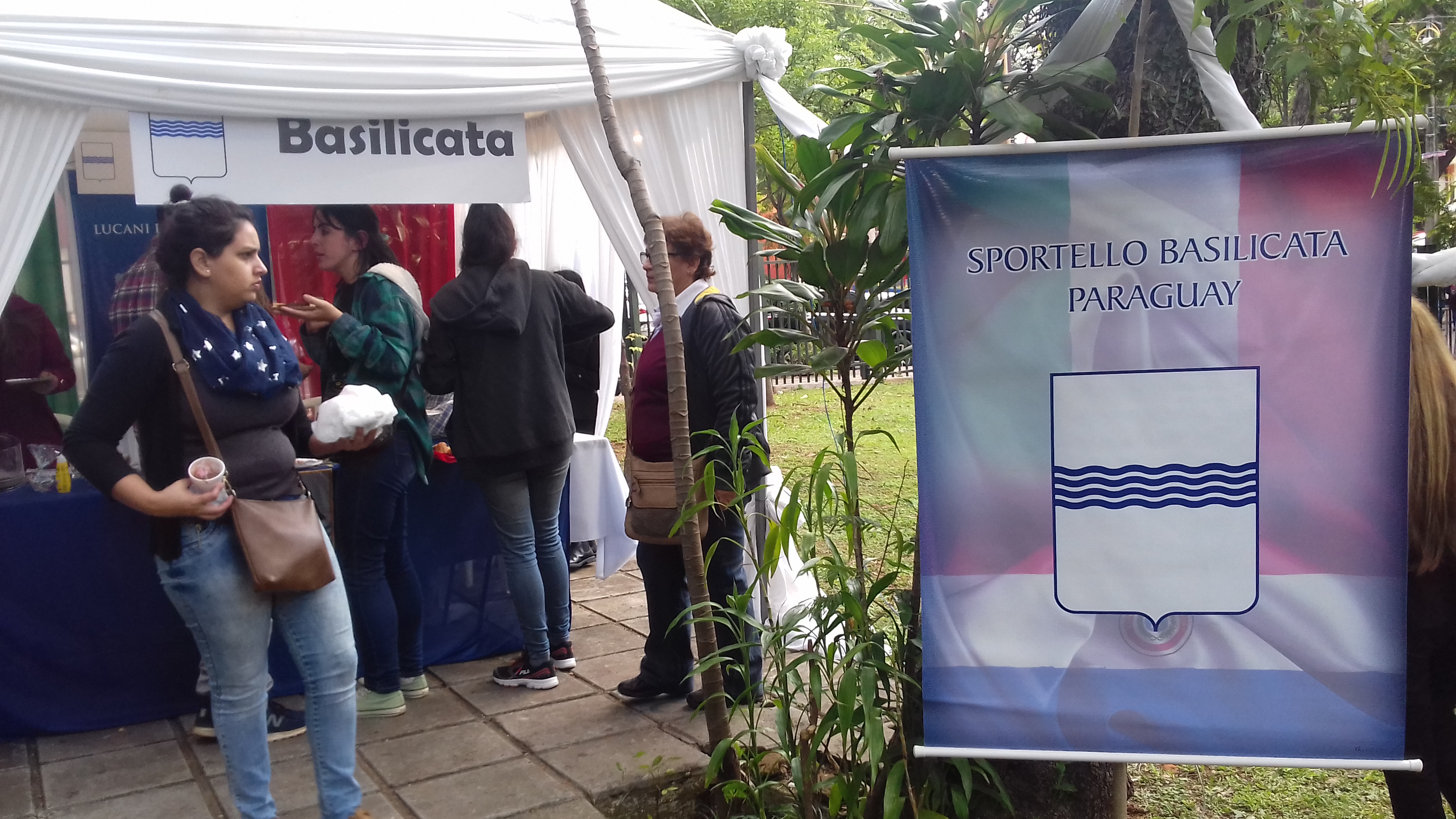

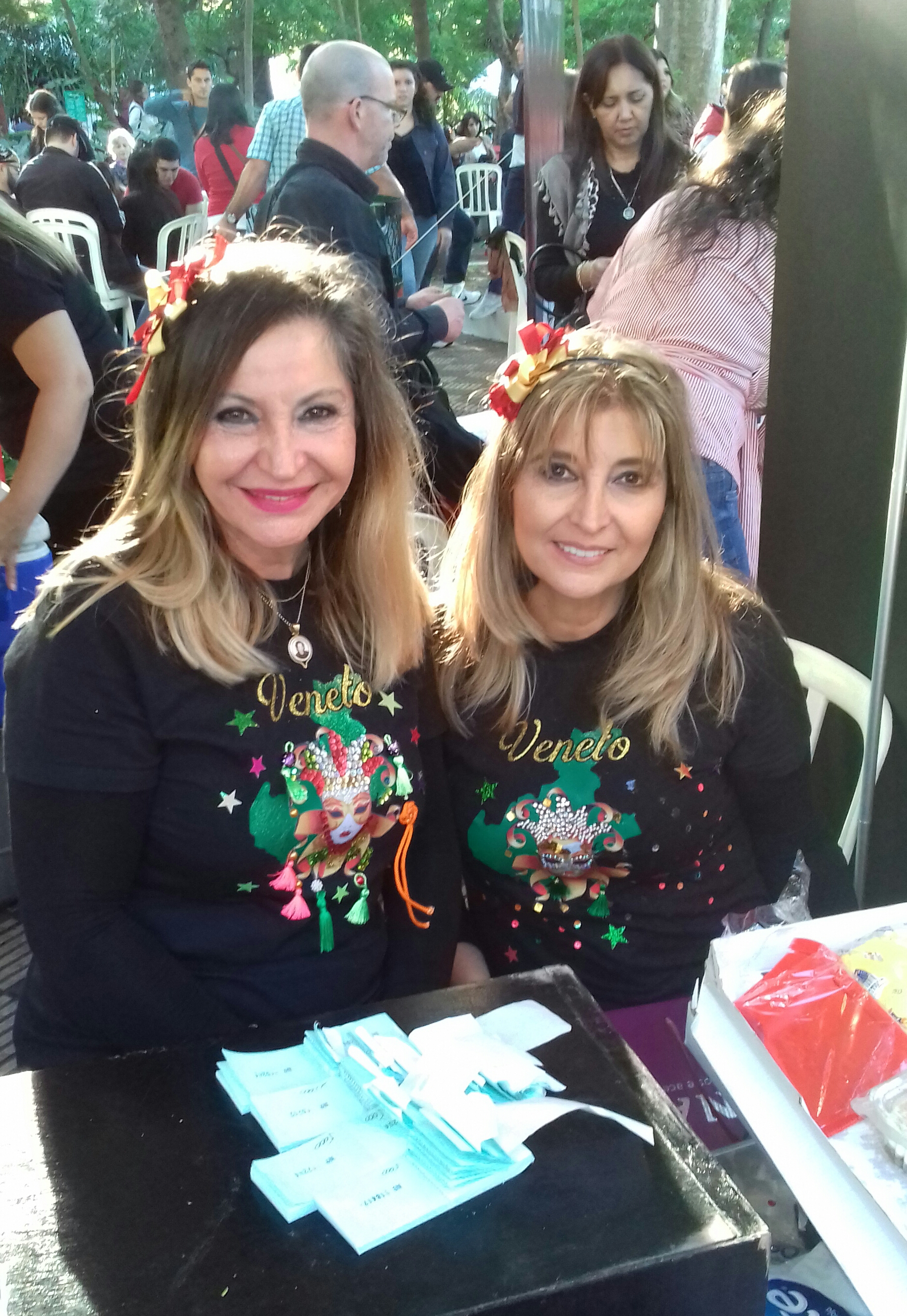

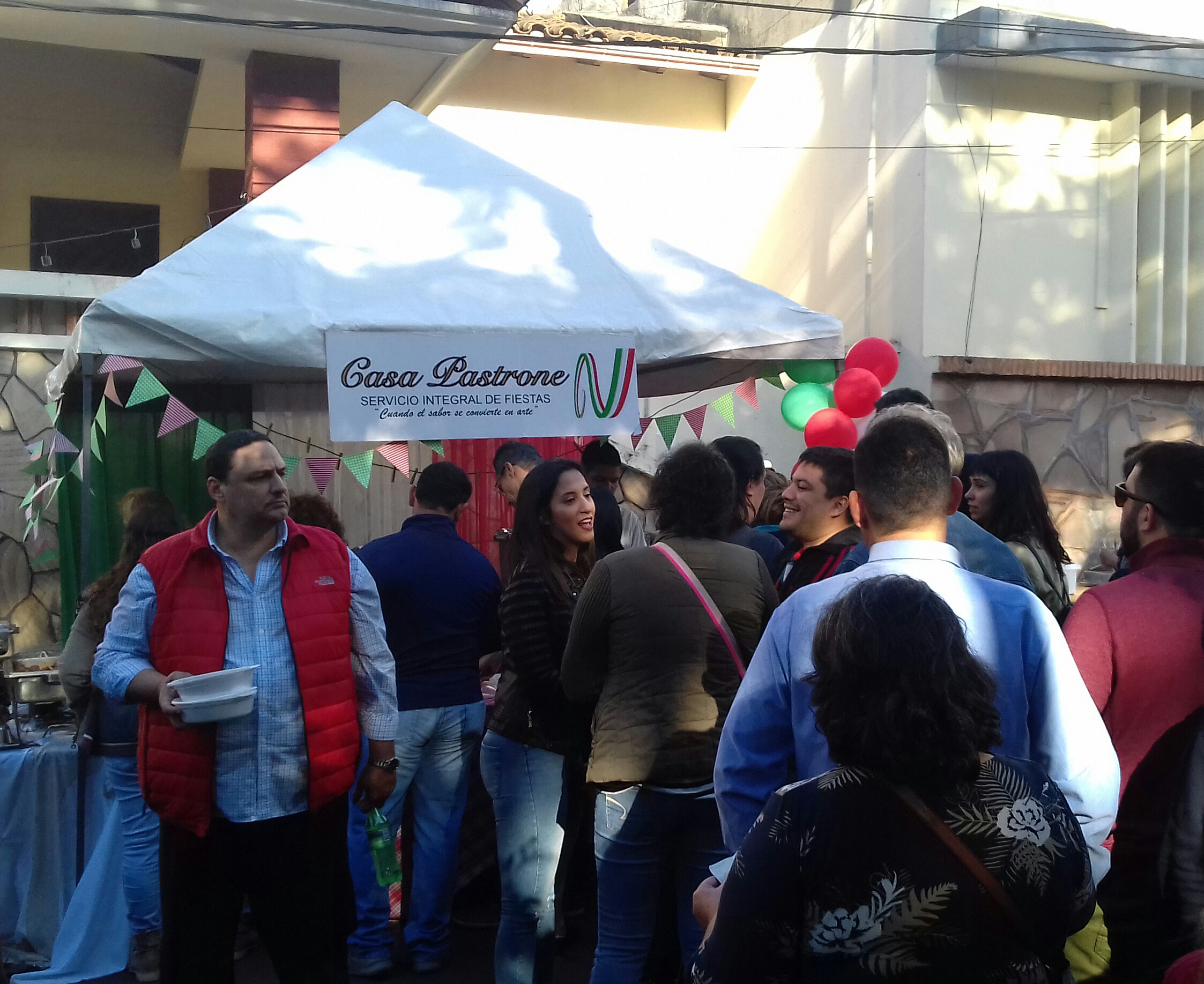

== See also ==
- Immigration to Paraguay

== Bibliography ==
- « A migratory crossroads in the heart of South America : Paraguay in the 19th and 20th centuries ». Maria Victoria Benitez Martinez, (written in French) under the title : Un carrefour migratoire au coeur de l'Amérique du Sud : Le Paraguay du XIX° et du XX° siècle. Université de Paris, 2021. 870pp. pdf available on-line.
