= Casa de la Independencia Museum =

Museum in Asunción, Paraguay

The Casa de la Independencia Museum
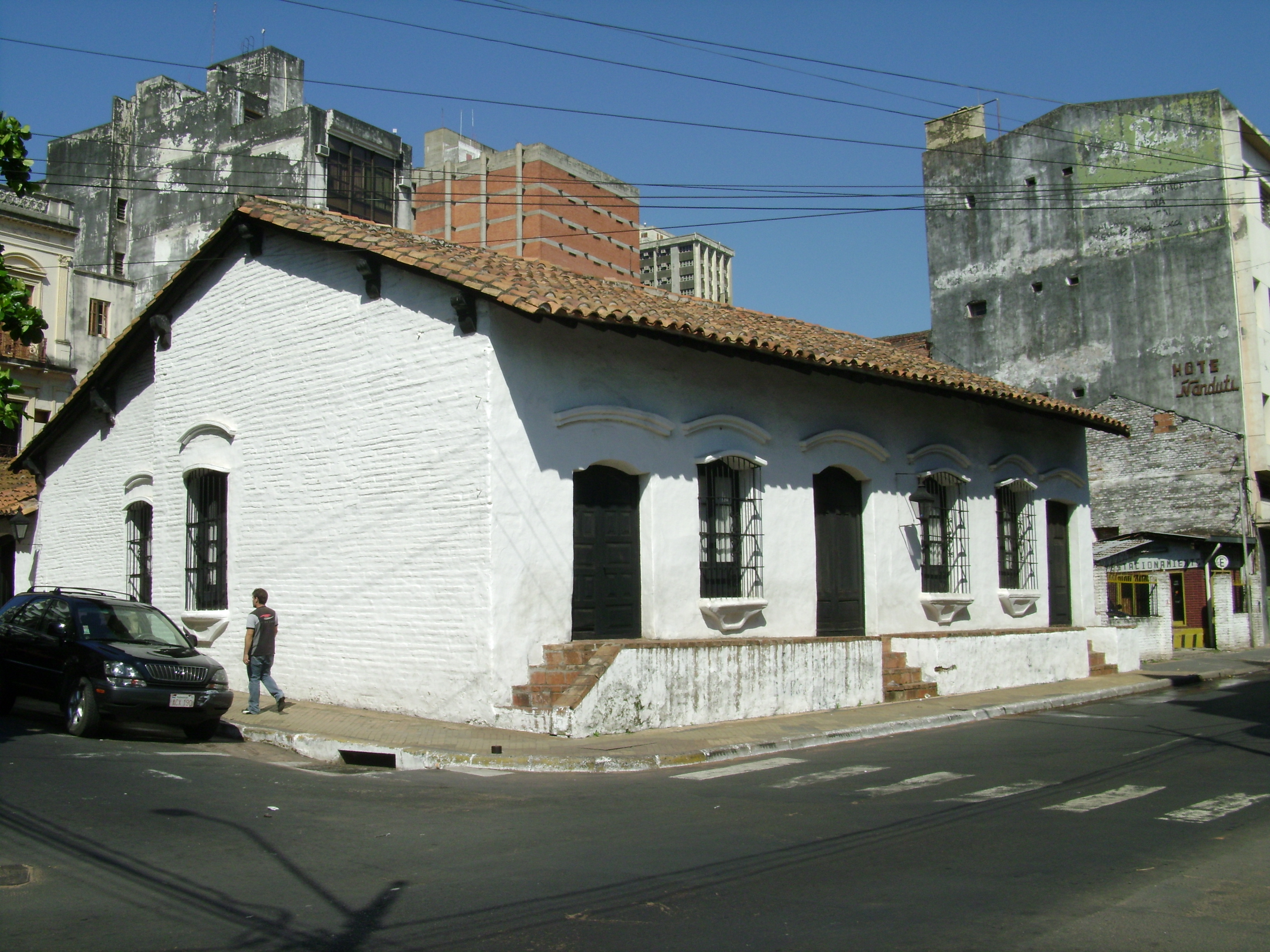
- Casa de la Independencia museum building
- Established: 14 May 1965
- Location: Asunción, Paraguay
- Coordinates: 25.2806°S 57.6362°W
- Type: History museum

The Casa de la Independencia Museum is a history museum and historic house located in Asunción, Paraguay.

The museum was inaugurated on May 14, 1965, and showcases pieces of history that date back to the independence of the country. During the evening of May 14, 1811, a group of Paraguayans emerged from this house to declare the independence of Paraguay. It is a national monument that has great historical significance. Behind its walls the emancipation from the Spanish colonial rule was planned in a silent and brave manner. Located on the corner of the streets Presidente Franco and 14 de Mayo, it has a marked colonial style.

== History ==
The house was built in 1772 by the Spanish settler Antonio Martínez Sáenz who was married to the Paraguayan Petrona Caballero de Bazán. The walls were constructed from adobe; with thatched roof and framework made of bamboo and palm wood. The Martínez Sáenz-Caballero de Bazán couple had two children, Pedro Pablo and Sebastián Antonio. Both brothers inherited the house and used it together with their wives Carmen Speratti and Nicolasa Marín, respectively. Besides the two married couples, two young ladies, Facunda Speratti and Virginia Marín, sisters of Carmen and Nicolasa, lived in the house. The threads of the nation's history started to interweave around this family.

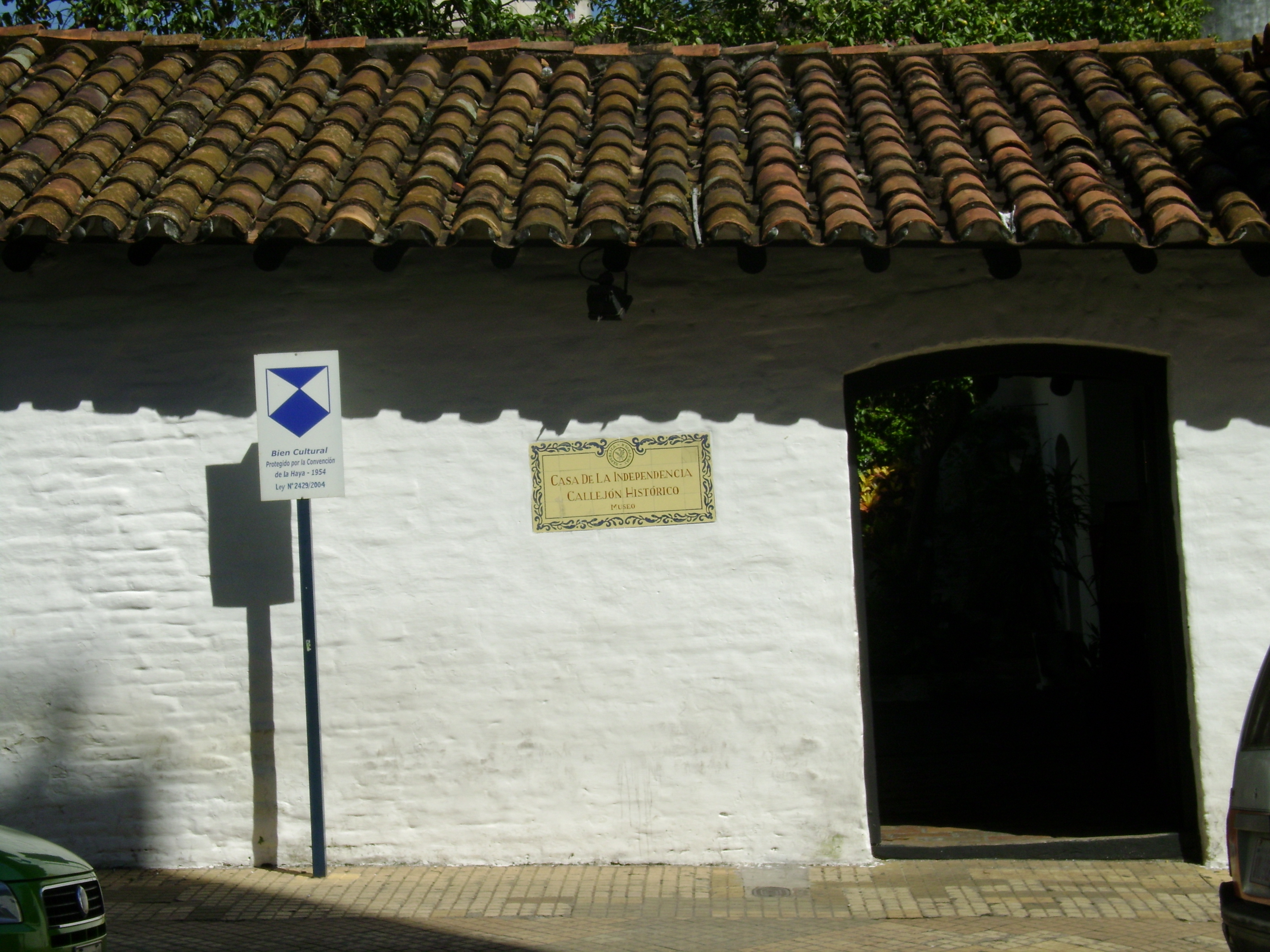
The rear entrance

The house was also used to lodge Captain Pedro Juan Caballero when he visited Asuncion from his provincial hometown. Across the street was the residence of Juana Martínez de Lara, aunt of the patriot Vicente Ignacio Iturbe, who used to live in his aunt's house. Captain Juan Bautista Rivarola Matto, usually residing in Barrero Grande, lodged in the house of his mother-in-law which was next to the old alley. The patriot Fulgencio Yegros and lieutenant Mariano Recalde also went frequently to the Martinez's house. They were courting Facunda Speratti and Virginia Marín.

Due to these circumstances and its location, the residence of the Martínez brothers became the perfect place to conceal the secret meetings that were held to organize the conspiracy against the Spanish rule.

On the night of May 14, 1811, a group of men, led by Pedro Juan Caballero, took the alley next to the house and went to the Governor's house, few blocks distant in order to force him into a power-sharing agreement.

== Rooms ==
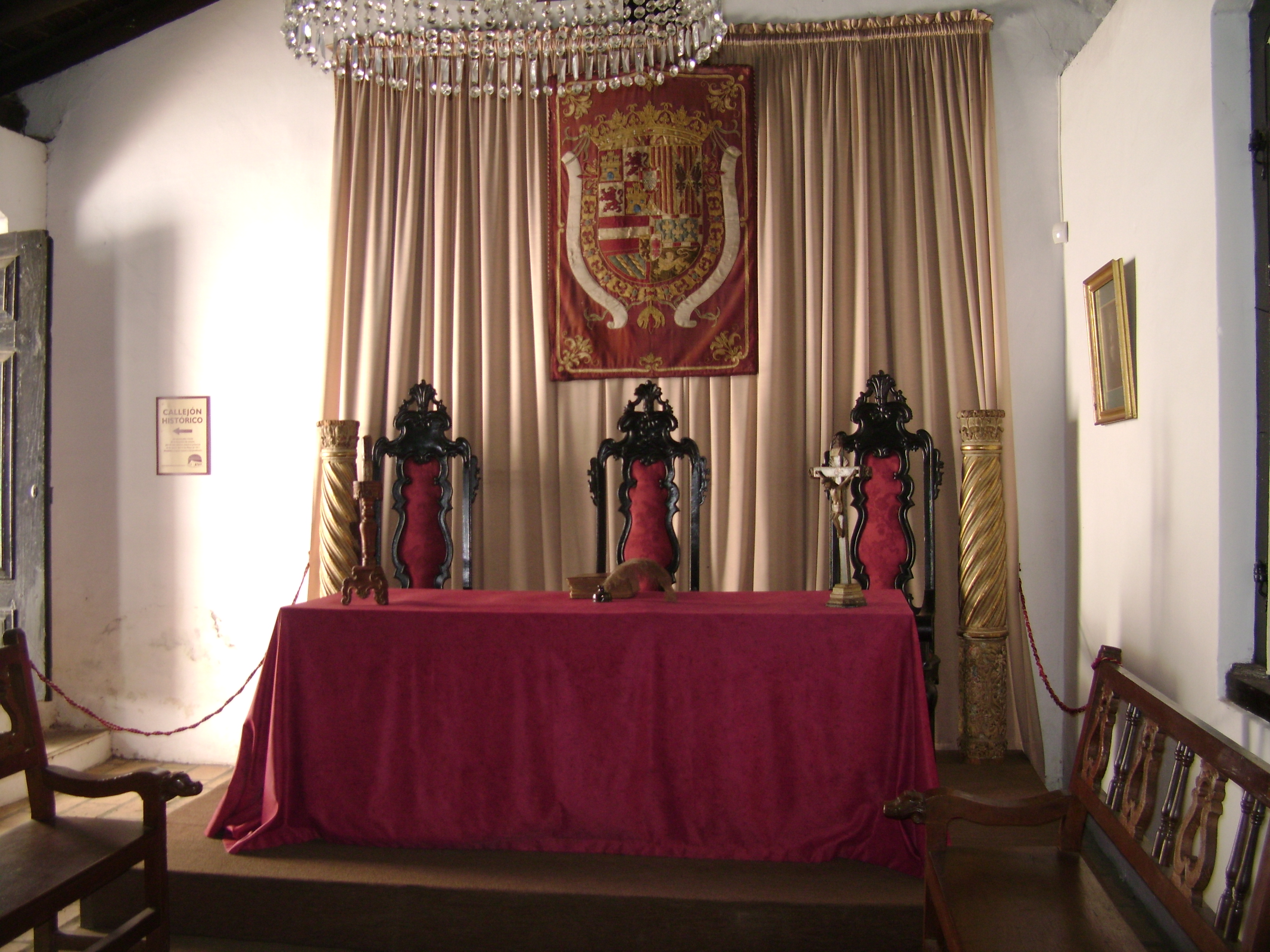
Office room

The house includes the following rooms.

Office room

Important documents from this period, signed by various patriots of the Paraguayan independence are kept in this room. Here is also exhibited a bureau which belonged to Fernando de la Mora and five pictures, among which one stands out, representing a key moment of the independence – the intimidation of Governor Velazco, painted by Jaime Bestard.

Dining room

Here are displayed furniture and objects in common use during the colonial period. A sword which belonged to Fulgencio Yegros is exhibited in one of the windows, as well as a highlighted portrait of Doctor José Gaspar Rodríguez de Francia.

Living room

A suite of French furniture from 1830 is exhibited under a crystal chandelier and a brazier made of wood and bronze. Two full-length portraits of Pedro Juan Caballero and Fulgencio Yegros can also be seen. Religious carvings made in Jesuits and Franciscan workshops complete the room.

Bedroom

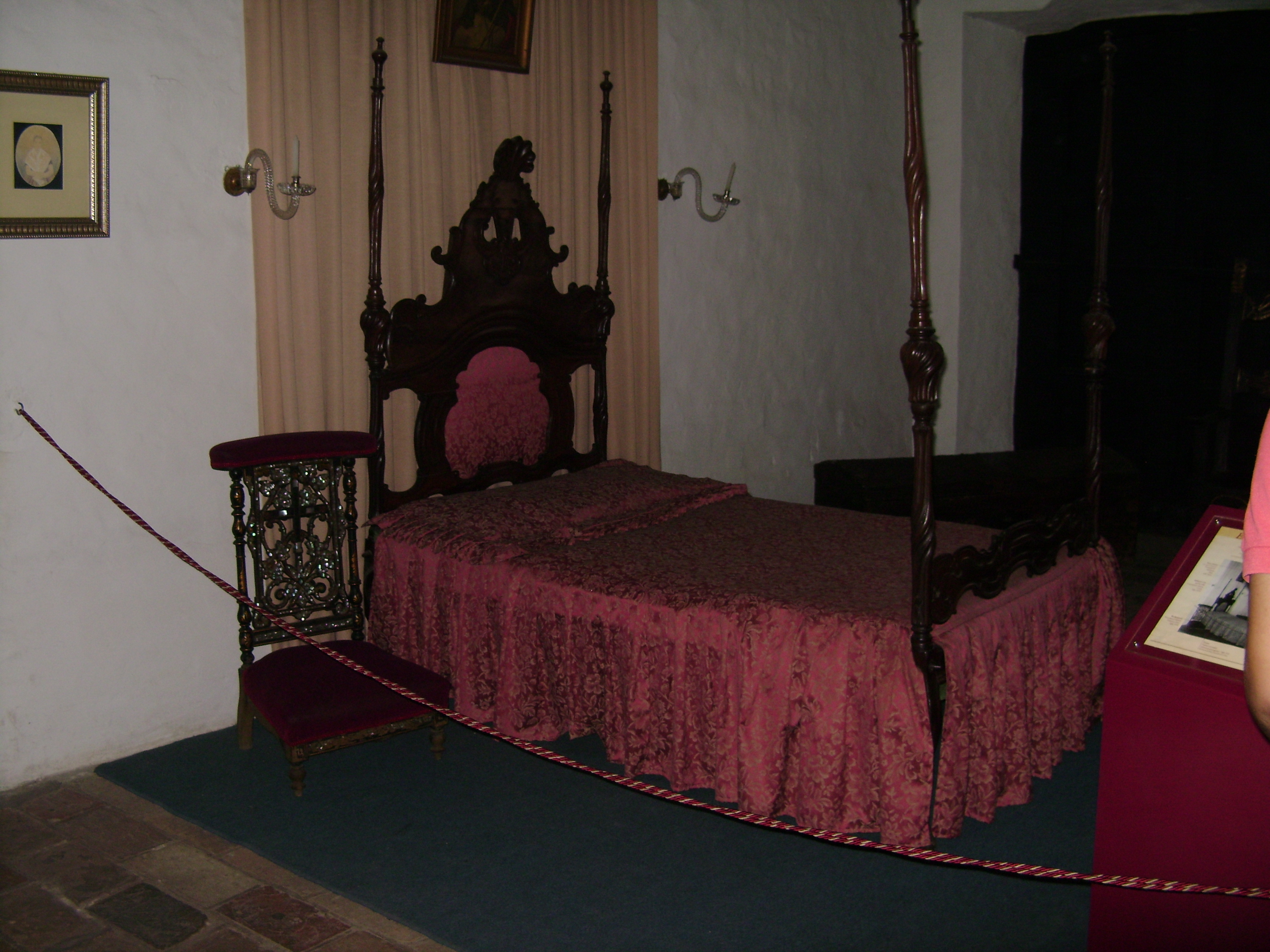
Bedroom

A bed which belonged to Fernando de la Mora is placed here and his portrait can be seen on the wall. Below the picture, there is an embroidered shirt worn by him. A large chest used by Juan Bautista Rivarola, a peculiar toilet, a magnificent prie-dieu and a polychrome niche complete the atmosphere of the room.

Oratory

Jesuit and Franciscan carvings and diverse religious objects of different origins are exhibited in this room. A portrait of the priest Francisco Xavier Bogarín can also be seen here.

Corridor

Two large boards carved in wood from church doors in the missions are placed in the adjacent corridor. Below them, there are the remains of the disappeared eaves of the house, which give us an idea about the measurements and characteristics of the materials used in constructions during the colonial period.

Yard

A mural painted by José Laterza Parodi is highlighted in this place. Here you can read the text of the note of 20 July 1811, addressed to the Primera Junta in Buenos Aires, in which the independence of Paraguay was asserted. Below the note, the first coat of arms of the nation adopted during the government of Doctor Gaspar Rodríguez de Francia is displayed. At the foot of it there is the sundial from the Jesuit mission of Santa Rosa. A tumulus covering the mortal remains of the illustrious patriot Juan Bautista Rivarola Matto and brought from the Barrero Grande cemetery, nowadays Eusebio Ayala can be seen in one of the yard corners.

Capitulary Saloon

Crossing the yard, there is a replica of the Capitulary Saloon of the old Cabildo de Asunción, the first in the Río de la Plata, established on September 16, 1541. In the centre of the room, there is the coat of arms of Spain from 1800. On the walls hang a magnificent portrait of the Emperor, Charles V; besides, other pictures show several revolutionary intents, previous to the independence.

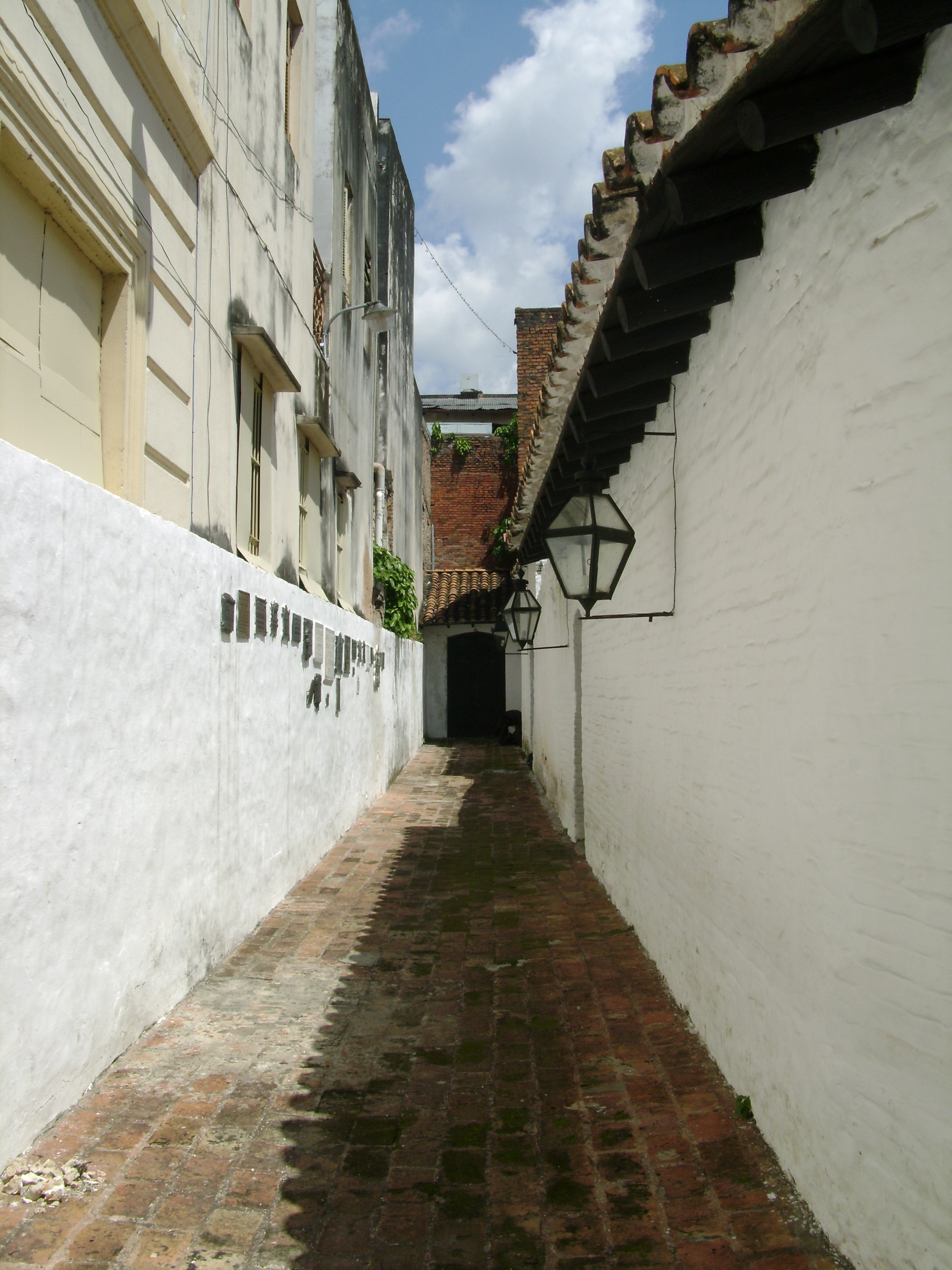
Callejón Histórico

== Historical Alley ==
The Historical Alley is entered through the door of the Capitulary Saloon. This place represents one of the most significant places of the house, as brave Paraguayan patriots walked through to begin the independence of the country. It was also through this alley that Juana Maria de Lara went to the Cathedral of Asunción to request Padre Molas for the expected signal: the ringing of the bronze bells, to whose call the Paraguayan came in the morning of May 15 to celebrate the historical moment in which the new Republic of Paraguay was born.

== Other significant information ==
As a testimony that in this house the emancipation of the country was planned, during the government of Carlos Antonio López and by a Decree issued in April 1849, in which the streets in Asunción were named for the first time, it was established to call 14 de Mayo (May 14) to the street in front of the Historical Alley. A mural made by the ceramist José Laterza Parodi, can be seen at the entrance of the muse In 2003, 38 years after the opening of the Historical Museum, the house was visited by Bachelor Nicolás Darío Latourrete Bo, who after seeing the bad conditions of the place helped in restoring the dignity of the museum. In February 2003, the restoration of works and conservation of valuable relics began. The same year, the Ministry of Culture and Education assigned Mr Latourrete Bo protector of the Independence House. In 2005, he is declared Life Protector of the museum, an unprecedented fact in Paraguayan history.

== Opening times ==
The Museum "Casa de la Independencia" can be visited: from Monday to Friday from 7:00 a.m. to 6:30 p.m. and on Saturdays from 8:00 to 12:00 a.m.

== Bibliography ==
- Oliveira y Silva de Acuña, Yani. Casa de la Independencia. Asunción. Paraguay
