= Roque Centurión Miranda =

Paraguayan actor and director (1900–1960)

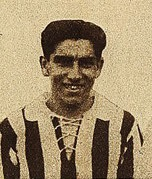
Roque Centurión Miranda. Los Sports, 1924-11-07 (87)

Roque Centurión Miranda (August 15, 1900, in Carapeguá – January 31, 1960, in Asunción) was a Paraguayan playwright, theater director and stage, radio and film actor. Enriched by a creative and enthusiastic group of young actors and playwrights including Luis Ruffinelli, Miguel Pecci Saavedra, Francisco Martín Barrios, Facundo Recalde, Benigno Villa and Arturo Alsina, Centurión Miranda is remembered as one of the true creators of the Paraguayan theatre. He began working as an actor. In 1926 he wrote his first play, Cupido sudando, a comedy in three acts, earning him critical acclaim after it was performed. Later, in 1932, in collaboration with Josefina Pla, he wrote Episodios chaqueños. His 1933 Guaraní-language drama Tuyú in three acts, which dealt with young Chaco blood spilled by Paraguayan soldiers, was a major success and is considered by critics to be the cornerstone of the Guaraní theatre.

== His first steps ==
Centurión Miranda’s parents were J.C. Centurión and Francisca Miranda. He studied at the Colegio Nacional de Asunción. In 1926, he joined the first Paraguayan professional company: the Paraguayan Company of Comedy that had been created a decade before. This company was enriched by a creative and enthusiastic group of young actors and dramatists including Luis Ruffinelli, Miguel Pecci Saavedra, Francisco Martín Barrios, Facundo Recalde, Benigno Villa and Arturo Alsina. Theater in Guarani developed at the hands of the dramatists Francisco Martín Barrios, Benigno Villa, Rigoberto Fontao Meza and Félix Fernández.

== Theatrical works ==
In 1939, radio theater emerged. Its driving forces were Centurión Miranda and Josefina Plá who founded Proal, a sublime on-air news program, according to Carlos R. Centurion. There they created, among other things, the work Desheredado, written by both authors.

Soon after the signing of the peace treaty of the Guerra del Chaco, the group La Peña was born. Through radio, it promoted the theater with Centurión Miranda, Arturo Alsina, Hérib Campos Cervera, Clotilde Pinho, and Josefina Plá as the leading roles.

In 1938–1939, this group of enthusiastic artists built the radio diary Proal. Through these dramatists, this program broadcast pieces of written works such as La hermana impaciente, La hora de Caín and Desheredado.

Alternating the roles of actor and author, in 1942 he was working again with Josefina Pla, writing several works together such as La hora de Caín, María Inmaculada, Aquí no ha pasado nada, Un sobre en blanco o Paréntesis, La huella, Pater familias and Porasy. These continued to earn the respect of critics and the public.

In 1950 he founded the Municipal School of Performing Arts (Escuela Municipal de Arte Escénico). Centurión Miranda also appeared in three major film productions alongside Argentine movie stars. He starred in films such as Codicia (1955), El trueno entre las hojas (1958) and La sangre y la semilla (1959). La sangre y la semilla was directed by Alberto Du Bois, co-starring Olga Zubarry and Ernesto Báez. Centurión Miranda died in Asunción on January 31, 1960. Currently, the municipal theatrical school which he founded is named after him in his honor.
