= General Diaz =

General Díaz is a neighbourhood Asunción, Paraguay. General Diaz or Díaz may also refer to:

- Club General Díaz, a Paraguayan football club
- Armando Diaz (1861–1928), Royal Italian Army general
- Antonio F. Díaz (1789-1869), Uruguayan Army general
- Félix Díaz (politician) (1868–1945), Mexican Federal Army general
- José E. Díaz (1833–1867), Paraguayan Army general
- Porfirio Díaz (1830–1915), Mexican Army general

== See also ==
- Francis Dias (1934–2019), Indian Army lieutenant general
- Jagath Dias (born 1960), Sri Lanka Army major general
