= Adriano Irala =

Paraguayan intellectual, professor and journalist

- Born: Adriano Irala; July 21, 1894; San Jose de los Arroyos, Paraguay
- Died: August 18, 1933 (aged 39); Asunción, Paraguay
- Occupations: Journalist, Professor

Adriano Irala (July 21, 1894 – August 18, 1933) was a Paraguayan intellectual, professor and journalist.

== Biography ==
Irala was born 21 July 1894 in San Jose de los Arroyos.

In 1911, he finished high school with a gold medal, and joined the Facultad de Derecho y Ciencias Sociales where he earned his doctorate thesis with “El Ejecutivo Colegiado”.

He married Zoraida Burgos, and they had two sons - Adriano and Geronimo Irala Burgos, both intellectuals and artists.

He taught Logic and Psychology at the Colegio Nacional de la Capital and at the Escuela Normal de Profesores. He was a university professor and holder of the Chair of International Law. He was also Director of the newspaper "La Nacion" and in 1928 founded the opposition party Liga Nacional Independiente with other politicians.

He joined the Paraguayan delegation that traveled to Peru for the celebrations of the centennial of the battle of Ayacucho, where he delivered a speech expressing his gratitude for the Peruvian solidarity in the war of 65.

Because of their political beliefs adverse to the government, he endured the bitterness of exile and could return to the motherland with the assumption to power of the ruler Eusebio Ayala.

He volunteered to serve in the Chaco war. He was incorporated into the army with the rank of Major to act as auditor of war in command of operations. During the contest he caught a serious illness, which eventually killed him. He was evacuated to Asunción, where he died 18 August 1933.

== Legacy ==
Adriano Irala belonged to the romantic liberal generation, which according to the vision of Republican politician and writer Natalicio Gonzalez, Paraguay broke into the post-war "as an intellectual tragedy."

Writer Carlos Zubizarreta called Irala "one of the purest and balanced minds of his generation".

== Works ==
Some verse by young Adriano Irala:

Crusade for the good life as a pilgrim
With a soul Aromas of sadness and love
A distant star shows me around on the road
And my nights poured into his pale radiance.

I spent my dreams as high chimera
Through life, through the pain
Boost my craft a wind of chimera
In a charming island will be the conqueror.

And live "my life, go" my way”
And when fatigued, to its shore I lay,
To sleep the dream that has nothing to disturb.

Flower in my lips a tender smile
And feel the kiss on the forehead of a breeze
From the summit I could not reach distant.
