= Arturo Alsina =

Paraguayan writer and dramatist

Arturo Alsina (September 16, 1897 – May 24, 1984) was a Paraguayan writer and dramatist. Born in Tucumán, Argentina to a family of Catalan origin, he moved to Paraguay with his family in 1909. He remained there the rest of his life, dying in Asunción.

Alsina's circle of acquaintance was wide, and he counted among his friends many of the leading Paraguayan intellectuals of the day. Among them were Adriano Irala, Carlos R. Centurión, Vicente Lamas, Natalicio González, Alejandro Guanes, Hérib Campos Cervera, Julio Correa, Narciso R. Colmán, Roque Centurión Miranda, Agustín Barrios, José Asunción Flores, Juan Samudio, Jaime Bestard, Pablo Alborno, and Juan Sorazábal. He also worked closely with Manuel Ortiz Guerrero, writing the prologue for the latter's complete works, as well as the Historia de la Cultura Paraguaya by Centurión.
