= Miguel Pecci Saavedra =

Paraguayan writer (1890–1964)

Miguel Pecci Saavedra (1890-1964) was a Paraguayan playwright, novelist, literary critic and humanist. He is counted amongst a creative and enthusiastic group of young actors and playwrights including Luis Ruffinelli, Francisco Martín Barrios, Facundo Recalde, Benigno Villa and Arturo Alsina who were of major importance to the development of Paraguayan theatre in the 1920s. He was best known for his plays under the pen name "Arnaldo Miriel" such as Los convidados a una cena, a comedy in one act, Maria del Carmen, a drama performed at the Teatro Nacional in 1925, and Manos Blancas, a monologue recited at the Teatro Granados in 1924. He exiled himself from Paraguay some say after he received excessive criticism from Arsenio López Decoud over his 1926 book Mona Lisa y Leonardo. He moved to Buenos Aires where he published Etópolis (1947) and Boceto Renacentista Ymonna Lisa Yleoardo (1949). Etópolis in particular remains one of his best known works.
