= Fiorella Migliore =

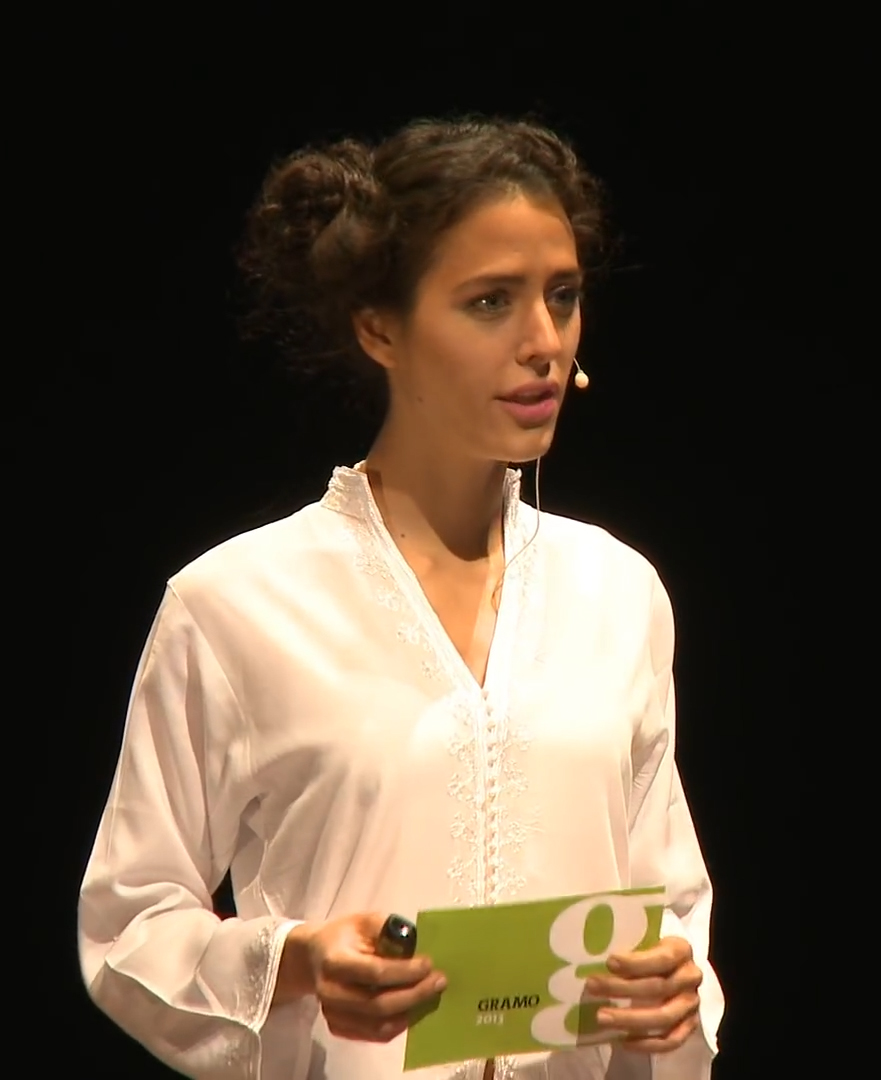
- Migliore in 2013
- Born: Fiorella Migliore Llanes; January 21, 1989 (age 37); Asunción, Paraguay
- Occupation: Actress
- Years active: 2008 - present

Fiorella Migliore Llanes (born 27 January 1989 in Asunción) is a Paraguayan actress, tv host, model and beauty pageant titleholder who was crowned Miss Mundo Paraguay 2012 and represented her country at Miss World 2012 but did not place. She is of Italian origins, through her father who was born in Comiso (Sicily).

== Data ==
Fiorella was crowned Miss Italia Paraguay in 2008 and Miss World Paraguay in 2012. She has been awarded the "Foglio d'Oro" Prize by the monthly newspaper Il Foglio Italiano. In advertising she has been the face of perfume brands such as Sweet Care and Pulp refreshments.

In Italy she started her actress career in the TV series Don Matteo, La Ladra and Pius XII: Under the Roman Sky (directed by Canadian Christian Duguay with James Cromwell as the Pope Pius XII).

In 2010, Migliore starred in the film Universo servilleta, and in 2012 appeared in Libertad, la lucha por la independencia, opposite Lourdes Llanes, Joaquín Serrano, Bruno Sosa Bofinger and Rafael Alfaro.

Also in 2012 she appeared on the third episode of the twentieth season of the popular American reality show The Amazing Race, when it was filmed in Asunción, and greeted the competing teams at the leg's "Pit Stop".

== See also ==
- Italo-Paraguayans
- Miss World 2012
