= Juan Sorazábal =

Paraguayan painter and draughtsman

Juan Sorazábal (1904-1944) was a Paraguayan painter and draughtsman. A native of Asunción, he later moved to Buenos Aires, where he died. He was friends with Arturo Alsina, the playwright.
