= Alejandro Guanes =

- Born: Alejandro Guanes; November 18, 1872; Asunción, Paraguay
- Died: May 28, 1925 (aged 52); Asunción, Paraguay
- Known for: Poet, Prose-writer, Teacher and Journalist

Alejandro Guanes (born Asunción November 28, 1872) was a Paraguayan poet, prose-writer, teacher and journalist.

== First steps and career ==
He was son of Francisco Guanes and Matilde Recalde. While still a teenager, he traveled to Buenos Aires, Argentina, to continue his studies at the San José High School of the capital. There he released his first poems, "Primavera" (Spring) among them, that was dedicated to his far and beloved country. Back to his country, he collaborated with journals and magazines, among them the "Paraguayan Institute Magazine" that, influenced by Guanes, included permanently a section devoted to poetry of young authors like Ignacio A. Pane, Juan E. O'Leary, Guanes himself among the local, and of foreigners like Victorino Abente y Lago and Martín de Goycochea Menéndez. He cultivated the journalistic satyr using the alias of "Uncle Camándulas". He was redactor of "El Diario", "La Tribuna" and "El Orden", important journals related to the so-called "Paraguayan Novecentism", an aural movement and with great literary production in the Paraguay of that times.

He taught "Literary Preceptive" in the National High School of the Capital and translated English and Portuguese literature to the Spanish. One of the most famous was the poem "Ulalime" from Edgar Allan Poe.

He wrote when the memories of the Paraguayan War (1864–1870) were still fresh, and his poetry tries to settle down the spiritual values of a nation after the catastrophe.

In a prolix study about "The romantic modernist cycle in Paraguay", Juan Manuel Marcos says that Guanes "Died without publishing a single book, and without giving the title of the ones published after his death: 'Del viejo saber olvidado' (Of the old forgotten knowledge, 1926), essays of theosophic tendency, a mythic isle in the middle of the positivism, and 'De paso por la vida' (Passing through the life, 1936), post-romantic poems inspired in Lamartine, Musset, Espronceda, Zorrilla. His poem 'Las leyendas' (The Legends, 1909) calls out the Paraguayan traditions. 'Salve, Patria' (Hail Fatherland) motivates to the nation to stand up, majestically, its 'now beaten head', 'Primavera' (Spring) is the poem of the nostalgic youth, far away from the country. The intense lyricism of Guanes don't dissimulates the 'patriotic passion' common in every novecentist". "Del viejo saber olvidado" reunites his production in prose and "De paso por la vida" the poethic.

Hugo Rodríguez-Alcalá, in his “Paraguayan Literature” says: "His most representative poem, 'The Legends', is an impressive evocation of the ancient house of his ancestors that revives the most tragic moments of the history of his family. In this poem, and in another entitled 'Ocaso y aurora' (Sunset and Aurora), Guanes reveals to be a writer representative of his time..."

In 1984, Editorial Alcándara published a Poetic Anthology with the best of his literary production. In the presentation of the book could be read: "Bordering between the late romanticism and the initial approaches to the Paraguayan poetic modernism, the scarce but refined work from Alejandro Guanes [...] drops a tenuous crepuscular illumination through a hole generation of national writers. From the penumbra of the pain, dressed of invincible memories, with the evidence of the immortal luck that darkly motivates the precarious palpitation of men, the poet named his time and his people, never forgetting a raised love to the fatherland, the scenario of unfortunate blood that occupied his youth".

Carlos R. Centurión on his impressive "History of the Paraguayan literature" says that "Alejandro Guanes, in the first decade of the 20th Century, wrote "La cámara oscura" (The Dark Chamber", a dramatic comedy that never released".

The illustrate man of the Paraguayan theater, José Luís Ardissone, released a play based on the life of Guanes entitled "Caserón de añejos tiempos" (House of older times), like one of the verses of the emblematic "The Legends". This play was recorded and diffused profusely.

== Last years ==
Married with Serviliana Molinas, he died May 28, 1925, at the age of 52.
