= Facunda Speratti =

Paraguayan independence activist

Josefa Facunda Speratti was a Paraguayan independence activist who participated in the May 1811 revolution. She later married Fulgencio Yegros, the first head of state of an independent Paraguay.

== Life ==
Facunda Speratti was the daughter of José Tomás Speratti, who had immigrated from Bergamo, Italy to Paraguay before his daughter's birth.

She lived in the house of the Martínez Sáenz brothers, where the independence conspirators met to prepare the uprising, and was the girlfriend of Fulgencio Yegros, then one of the military officers fighting for Paraguayan independence. Together with Juana María de Lara, she helped prepare for the rebellion that took place on May 14 and 15, 1811, when the independence of Paraguay was proclaimed.
