= San José de los Arroyos =

- Town
- Location within Paraguay
- Coordinates: 25°32′24″S 56°43′48″W
- Country: Paraguay
- Department: Caaguazú

Population (2008)
  - Total: 5,544

San José de los Arroyos is a town in the Caaguazú Department of Paraguay.

== Description ==
It is located 100 km to the east of Asunción on a branch of the Pan-American Highway, "Ruta #2". The county comprises an urban area of around 8,000 inhabitants and some twelve smaller satellite villages or dependencies known as "colonias" raising its population to roughly 20,000 inhabitants.

== History ==
Although there is some controversy regarding its foundation, the official version is that it was founded by a former governor of Paraguay, Don Pedro Melo de Portugal on March 19, 1780, still during the time of Spanish colonialism and later elevated to a municipality in 1884. Like most towns in Paraguay with few exceptions, the colonial architecture survived until the early 1980s when, due to a lack of protective laws, it suffered a massive destruction and replacement by generic modern structures. It comprises an 887 km^{2} surface and topographically has two remarkably different types of terrain. The colonies to the west of the town are mostly formed by mild slopes with very fertile land adequate for cultivation of most agricultural products such as cotton, cassava, tobacco, soybean, sugarcane and some grains) and therefore more prosperous, whereas the east is characterized by mostly planes with few patches of elevated land good for agriculture. This region is mostly driven by raising cattle, but in recent years, it was discovered that these plains provide the ideal soil for sugar cane cultivation, the raw material for biofuel. It is worth mentioning that, in recent years, from the start of 2005, Paraguay has gained a privileged place in the international meet market entering demanding ones such as the European Union, Taiwan, Russia and Chile. This progress obviously has its repercussions to the eastern region of the town given the fact that these colonies are primarily dedicated to raising cattle. This also brought along other impacts such as a remarkable appreciation of the real estate value of the land. San Jose is in general an average Paraguayan town with a promising future based on the bio-fuel exploitation and the emerging solid cattle industry which, if administered wisely, can drastically change the fate of this town.
