= Fulgencio Yegros =

Consul of Paraguay (1780–1821)

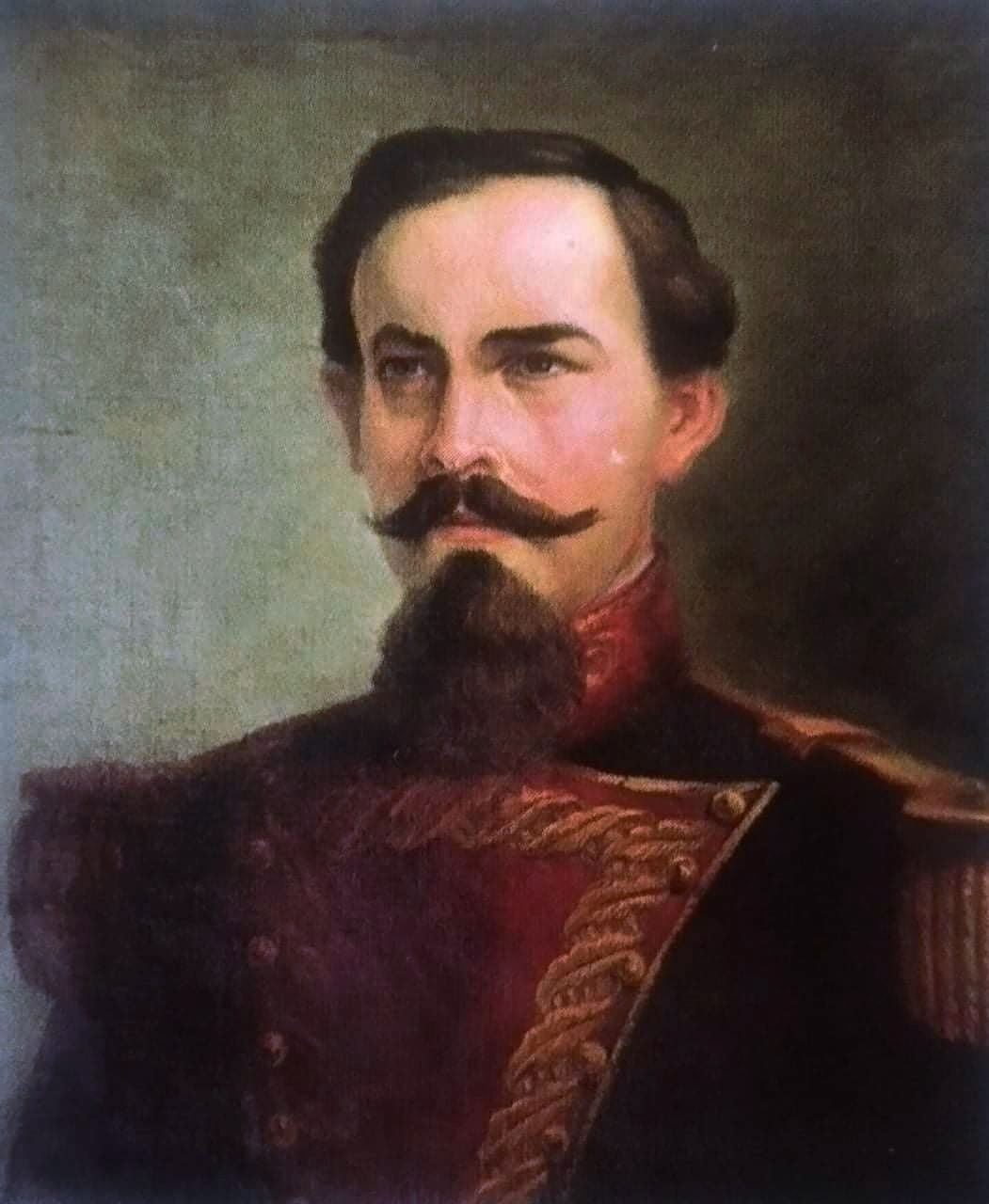
- Fulgencio Yegros, by Pablo Alborno (1910)
- Born: Fulgencio Yegros y Franco de Torres; 1780; Quyquyhó
- Died: July 17, 1821 (aged 40–41)
- Known for: First head of state of independent Paraguay
- Spouse: Facunda Speratti

Fulgencio Yegros y Franco de Torres (born 1780 in Quyquyhó, died 17 July 1821) was a Paraguayan soldier, landowner and the first head of state of independent Paraguay. The town of Yegros is named in his honor.

== Life ==
Yegros was born to a family of military tradition and also pursued a military career. Grandson of governor Fulgencio Yegros y Ledesma, he studied in Asunción and joined the Spanish colonial army. He had his first combat experiences in 1802 against the Portuguese and in 1807 when he was part of the Paraguayan forces that defended Buenos Aires during British invasions of the Río de la Plata. He reached the rank of captain in 1810 and was given the governorship of Misiones. In early 1811 he participated in Paraguay campaign and defended Paraguay against the invaders led by Manuel Belgrano.

Yegros and Pedro Juan Caballero were the main military figures in the Revolution of May 1811, which led to the Independence of Paraguay. Following independence, from June 19, 1811 until October 12, 1813 Yegros was President of the five-man ruling Junta Superior Gubernativa which in 1813 was replaced by a two-man consulate. Yegros and José Gaspar Rodríguez de Francia were chosen by Congress in 1813 as Consuls of the Republic following the model of the French Revolution. During this time, he founded the first military academy in independent Paraguay.

Yegros was more of a military man than a politician, and during his time as Consul he was marginalised by Francia. His term lasted from 12 February 1814 to 12 June 1814. After it ended, Francia was elected dictator of Paraguay and Yegros retired from public life to his estate.

In 1820 Yegros was a participant in the unsuccessful plot that tried to oust Francia from power. Following the failure of the plot, Yegros was imprisoned and was executed on 17 July 1821.

Political offices
Preceded by Position created	Consul of Paraguay; 1811–1813	Succeeded by José Gaspar Rodríguez de Francia
Preceded by José Gaspar Rodríguez de Francia	Consul of Paraguay; 1814	Succeeded by José Gaspar Rodríguez de Francia
