= Carlos Zubizarreta =

Paraguayan writer

- Born: 1904; Asunción, Paraguay
- Died: 1972; Asunción, Paraguay
- Occupation(s): Narrator, essayist
- Notable work: Historia de mi ciudad (1965), Cien vidas paraguayas (1961)

Carlos Zubizarreta was a writer born in Asunción, Paraguay in 1904.

== Infancy and youth ==
Zubizarreta studied at the Colegio San José in Asunción and applied to study law at the Universidad Nacional de Asunción. Founder and director of the famous cultural magazine "Juventud" (Youth) and collaborator of "Alas" (Wings) magazine, he was to some the finest narrator and essayist and most elegant writer in the history of twentieth-century Paraguayan literature.

== Career ==
In his "Historia de la Literatura Paraguaya" (History of Paraguayan Literature, 1971), Hugo Rodríguez-Alcalá wrote that Zubizarreta "... published his first book of essays, "Acuarelas paraguayas" Paraguayan watercolours, in 1940. These "watercolours" are vivid portraits of customs and folklore painted by a skillful artist – but a painter-historian who sees the Paraguay of today with one eye, and with the other the Paraguay of the past, of Irala, of Montoya, of López y Aguirre and the rest. In effect, he barely starts to paint modern Asunción ... before its current landscape disappears and a vision of the city of Conquest and Colony arises ... ".

== Works ==
Other titles from this prolific writer include:

Year	Title
1957	"Capitanes de la aventura" (Captains of Adventure), about two important names in the history of the Spanish conquest of Paraguay, Domingo Martínez de Irala and Alvar Núñez Cabeza de Vaca
1965	"Historias de mi ciudad" (Stories of my city)
1961	"Cien vidas paraguayas" (One hundred Paraguayan lives)
1966	"Los grillos de la duda" (The shackles of doubt)
1969	A collection of stories, and "Crónica y Ensayo" (Chronicle and Essay)

== Final years ==
He died in Asunción in 1972.
