= Silvio Pettirossi =

Paraguayan aviator (1887–1916)

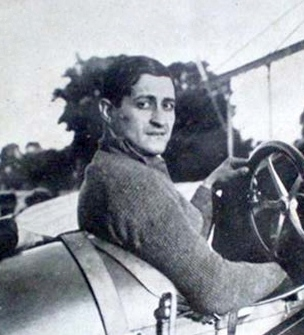
- Pettirossi in 1914
- Born: 16 June 1887; Asunción, Paraguay
- Died: 17 October 1916 (aged 29); Punta Lara, Buenos Aires Province, Argentina

Silvio Pettirossi Pereira (16 June, 1887 – 17 October, 1916) was a Paraguayan airplane pilot and aviation pioneer.

== Background ==
Pettirossi was born in Asunción on 16 June, 1887 to Italian immigrant parents. When he was a young man he firstly moved to Spoleto in Italy where he attended a military school, then to Buenos Aires where he became acquainted with the aviator Jorge Newbery who taught him how to fly.

== Aviation achievements ==
In 1912, Pettirossi received a scholarship from the Paraguayan government and moved to France where he obtained the title of aviator pilot from the international aeronautic federation. After receiving the title he made many important flights, one of which was a record eight-hour flight.

Pettirossi bought a Deperdussin model "T" monoplane with a 60 HP rotary Gnome engine. He made many famous acrobatic flights in Europe, South America and the United States.

In December 1914 he founded the Aeroclub del Paraguay and served as its first president.

== Death and legacy ==
On 17 October, 1916, while doing an inverted loop, the left wing of Pettirossi's plane broke, and the aircraft crashed to the ground in a ranch owned by the Castell family, in Punta Lara, Buenos Aires Province, where he died on impact.

Asunción's Silvio Pettirossi International Airport, three football clubs, the Airborne Brigade of the Paraguayan Air Force, a Paraguayan Air Force Base in Luque, a street in Asunción, a highway in Luque, the Paraguayan Institute of Aviation History, a school, and some other places are named after him.
