= Juan Bautista Rivarola Matto =

:Paraguayan writer (1933–1991)

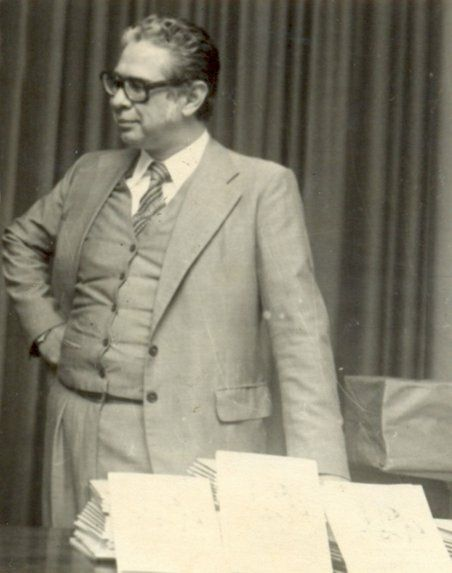
- Born: Juan Bautista Rivarola Matto; 12 November 1933; Asunción, Paraguay
- Died: 14 October 1991 (aged 57–58); Asunción, Paraguay
- Education: University of Buenos Aires
- Occupations: Journalist, dramatist
- Notable work: "San Lamuerte (Saint Death)" "Diagonal de Sangre (Diagonal of Blood)"
- Awards: Gabriel Casaccia Award

Juan Bautista Rivarola Matto (12 November 1933 – 14 October 1991) was a Paraguayan journalist, narrator, essayist and playwright who made a great contribution to the culture despite being active during the repressive dictatorship of Alfredo Stroessner.

== Early life and education ==
He was born in Asunción, on 12 November 1933 in the time of the Chaco War. He was the son of Octaviano Rivarola Bogarín and his wife, Victorina Matto. He was a member of a family of former settlers of Paraguay, very attached to the traditions of the country, which he loved immensely.

He was a student of Juan Pedro Escalada and studied in the Colegio Seminario de San Carlos (San Carlos's Seminary School). He was a member of the armed groups that fought against the dictatorial government of General Alfredo Stroessner in the 1960s.

He studied law and philosophy at the University of Buenos Aires and dedicated a great part of his life to scholarship, focusing in history.

Since childhood he was always involved in riots and revolutions. When he was thirteen years old there was a civil war in 1947, in which he took part on behalf of the revolutionaries. Like many of his generation, he participated in the political activity of the country, and had to live in exile for more than two decades. He returned to Paraguay in 1979 and worked in journalism until he died on 14 October 1991, in Asunción.

== Career ==
In 1979, he returned to Paraguay to stay and started working as a journalist for the newspaper Hoy. In 1980, he co-founded Ediciones NAPA (NAPA Editions) with Alvaro Ayala; the firm closed after four years due to the economic problems in the country. It published forty-two Paraguayan books, opening the gates for Paraguayan writers. He also wrote articles and editorials for the newspaper ABC Color, traveled on several occasions to Europe, where he studied and attended conferences.

== Work ==
Some of his published work:

- De cuando Carai Rey jugó a las escondidas (When Carai Rey Played Hide and Seek)
- Diagonal De Sangre (Diagonal of Blood), subtitled The History and Its Alternatives in the War of Paraguay; this work tried to explore the socio-economical, ideological and political scenario in which the War of the Triple Alliance developed (1864–1870)
- 1986 – San Lamuerte (Saint Lamuerte)
- El Santo de Guatambú (The Saint of Guatambú)
- 1970 – Yvypóra (from the Guaraní language, the direct translation is Ghost of the Earth)
- La isla sin mar
- Bandera sobre las tumbas (Flags over the Tombs)
- El Niño Santo (The Child Saint)
- Vidas y muerte de Chirito Aldama (Lives and Death of Chirito Aldama)
- La abuela del bosque (The Grandmother of the Forest)
- Yvypóra, Diagonal de

== Awards ==
- San Lamuerte – 1986 was awarded with the Gabriel Casaccia Award
- El Niño Santo won 1st Prize V Centenary in 1991
- Vidas y Muerte de Chirito Aldama won 2nd Prize V Centenary in 1991

The latter two were awarded ten days after his death and published later in 1994.
