= Luis Ruffinelli =

Paraguayan playwright, journalist and political activist

Luis Ruffinelli (1889 in Villarrica – 1973 in Asunción) was a Paraguayan playwright, journalist and political activist. Considered one of the innovators of the theatre in Paraguay in the 1920s, he was director of the newspaper El Diario and founded El Debate in 1937. Among his works are La conciencia jurídica del barrio, and a comedy in three acts called Sorprendidos y desconocidos. In 1939, he wrote the drama Cuando Guerra for the Teatro Radial which was then headed by Josefina Plá and Roque Centurión Miranda. He also wrote Guanirino in the Guaraní language. His plays are written in Guaraní and Castilian, with dialogues often showing great political color. He was a deputy under President Rafael Franco and a member of the Instituto Paraguayo de Letras and the Academia de Lengua y Cultura Guaraní.
