= General Díaz =

Coordinates: 25.2933°S 57.6378°W

- Barrio
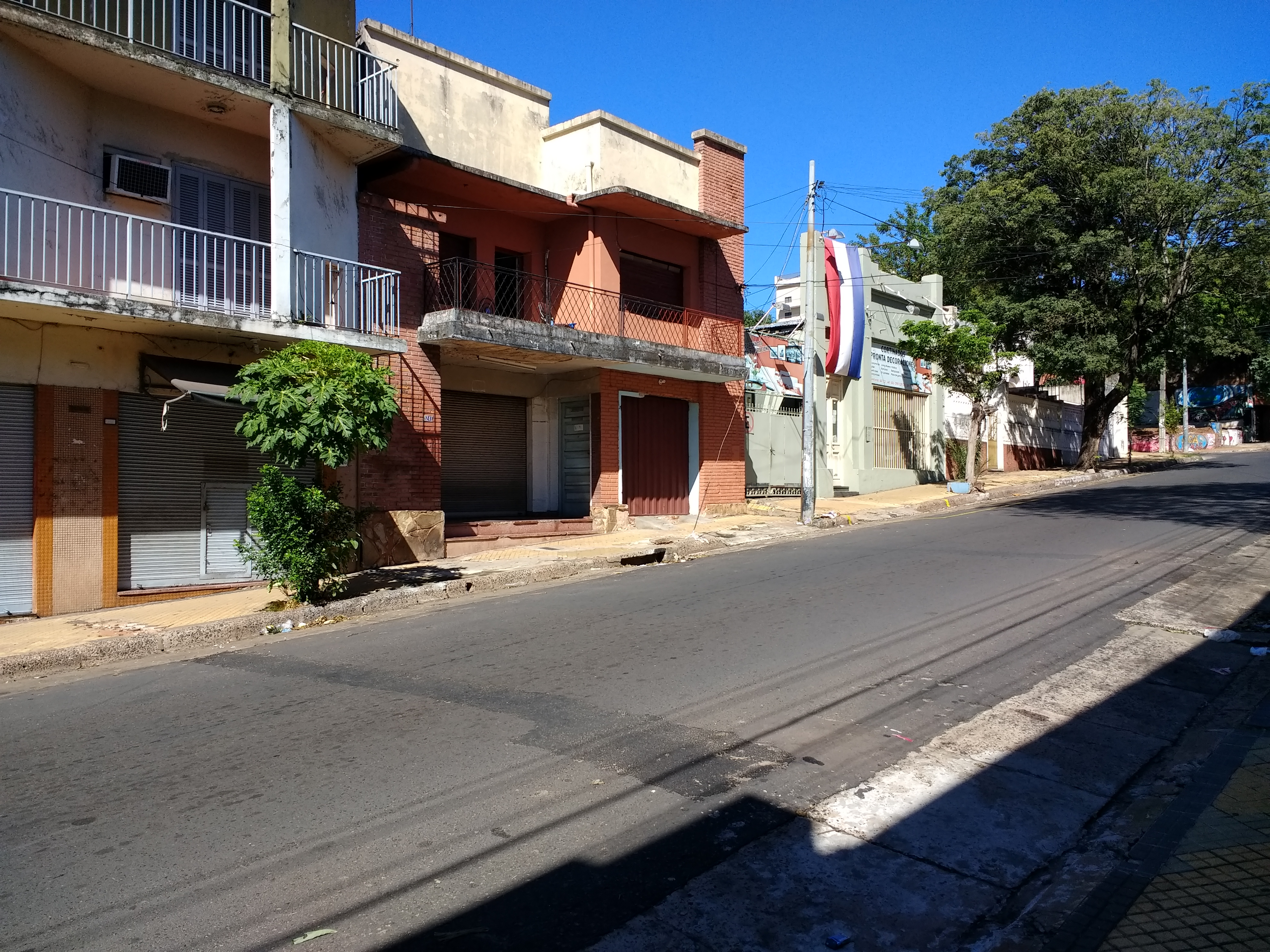
- Interactive map of General Díaz
- Country: Paraguay
- Autonomous Capital District: Gran Asunción
- City: Asunción

Area
  - Total: 0.83 km^{2} (0.32 sq mi)
- Elevation: 43 m (141 ft)

Population
  - Total: 7,140

General Díaz is a neighbourhood (barrio) of Asunción, Paraguay.
