= Colorado Party militias =

Paraguay paramilitary organizations

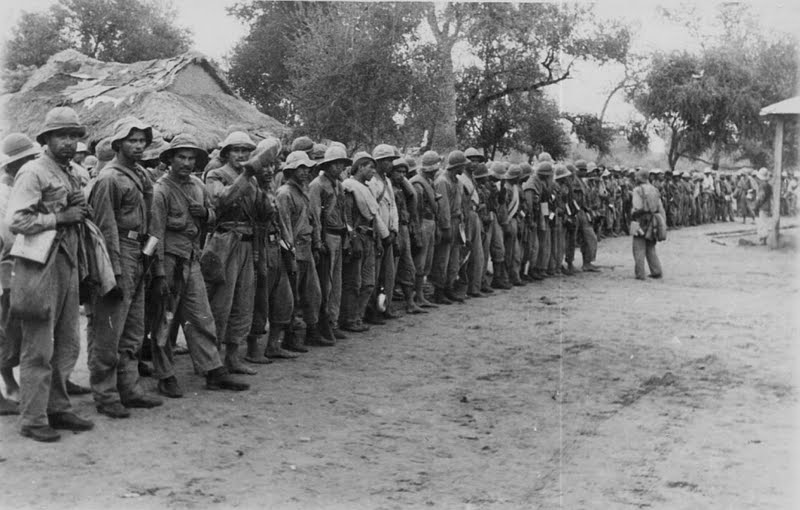
Following the Chaco War, many demobilized Paraguayan soldiers joined rural paramilitary organizations in the country.

During the course of the 20th century, the Colorado Party of Paraguay set up several paramilitary organizations and militias in the country. They defended party interests and positions by force and actively participated in armed civil conflicts, playing a decisive role in the 1947 civil war. During the period of one-party rule in Paraguay, they were key components of the repressive apparatus of the dictatorship of Alfredo Stroessner. Politically and ideologically, these paramilitary groups stood on far-right and anti-communist positions, from traditionalism to fascism.

== Py nandí ==
Paramilitary formations have been common in the political history of Paraguay since the time of the Paraguayan War. Political parties tried to acquire their own militant organizations. This was especially true for the right-wing conservative Colorado Party (Spanish for Red Party).

From the late 19th century, peasant militias of rural Colorado supporters were organized. In the second quarter of the 20th century, they received the collective name py nandí (which, in the Guaraní language, means "barefoot ones"). These detachments were recruited, as a general rule, from the poor peasantry, and were often Guaraní Indians. Their ideology involved conservative traditionalist sentiments combined with republican nationalism.

The degree of organization of py nandí was at first low. There was no unified structure, command, discipline. Obsolete weapons were selected by each participant independently; often limited to melee weapons or just clubs. At the same time, the py nandí were deeply motivated - admiration for the authority of party leaders, interest obtaining favors from the Colorado Party leadership, and faith in party ideology. The number of py nandí at times exceeded 15 thousand people. These formations established the regime of Colorado hegemony in the villages, and resulted in the political opposition being heavily persecuted in the rural areas of the country.

== Guión Rojo ==
The py nandí became the model and basis for other forms of the Colorado Party's paramilitary organization. In 1938, Colorado leader Juan Natalicio González undertook to reform the party militia. He formed the urban equivalent of the py nandí, the Colorado Action Groups (Grupos de Acción Colorada, GAC), and in 1942 organized part of these urban and rural formations into the Guión Rojo (Red Banner) militia.

The way the new structure differed from py nandí was in having a more broad social composition - not just peasants, but also city-dwelling petite bourgeoise, workers, criminals and right wing intellectuals participated. The Guión Rojo were better organized, and adhered to a clearer ideology of far-right radicalism (in many ways close to fascism) and anti-communism. They were distinguished by a personal loyalty to the founder Juan Natalicio González.

The Guión Rojo and py nandí played important roles in the 1947 Paraguayan Civil War. These detachments largely determined its outcome in favor of the right-wing forces and the government of Higinio Morínigo. During this time, the militants became infamous for their cruelty, not just in battle, but also in their subsequent reprisal against the supporters of the defeated rebels.

In the post-war period, the Guión Rojo helped Juan Natalicio González ascend to the presidency and consolidate power, but the activities of the "Guionists" gradually faded away due to the overthrow of González in 1949 and subsequent exile in 1950. The py nandí were restored in a more organized and regular formation. The Guión Rojo formally dissolved in 1966, but some of its leaders, such as Edgar Ynsfrán and Juan Manuel Frutos Fleitas, became important political figures in Paraguay.

== Under Stroessner ==
In 1954, the Colorado Party's paramilitary organizations enthusiastically supported the military coup d'état and the rise to power of General Alfredo Stroessner.

Stroessner's dictatorship cannot be understood without emphasizing the role of the Colorado Party and, ultimately, the guerrilla armies of the Civil War.

=== Py nandí under the Stroessner regime ===
In the second half of the 1950s, the py nandí militias helped government troops and the police to suppress the left-wing guerrilla movement against Stroessner, utilizing extreme violence and torture against the insurgents. The atmosphere they helped to create in the Paraguayan countryside ruled out any massive support for the partisans.

The py nandí retained their importance throughout the period of the Stronist dictatorship. They actively assisted the Colorado Party, the police and intelligence agencies, were involved in pro-government actions in cities - for example, in 1973 Py Nandi held a powerful counter-demonstration in Asuncion, turning the tide in favor of the government. The rural party militia played a prominent role in the peculiar "system of checks and balances" created by the dictator. Subordinate to Stroessner on the party line, the py nandí were an alternative armed force that limited the ambitions of the army command.

The paramilitaries of the ruling party were an important tool for agrarian reform and land redistribution. In many ways, their efforts suppressed attempts to resume leftist insurgent movements. The organizer of the agrarian reform and the main ideologue of the regime, Juan Manuel Frutos Fleitas, was himself a former member of the Guión Rojo militia.

=== Macheteros, GAA, Garroteros and Anti-Communist squadrons ===
Under Minister of the Interior Edgar Ynsfrán and, later, his successor Sabino Augusto Montanaro, more repressive organizations and death squads subordinate to the government were created in Paraguay. Two special services were organized under the Ministry of the Interior: the Department of Investigations of the Metropolitan Police (Departamento de Investigaciones de la Policía de la Capital, DIPC) under the leadership of Pastor Coronel, and the National Directorate of Technical Affairs (Dirección Nacional de Asuntos Técnicos, DNAT) directed by Antonio Campos Alum. Both units specialized in political repression.

The leading functionary of the punitive apparatus, the director of the DIPC, Pastor Coronel, created detachments called "Macheteros of Santaní". Their peculiarity lay in the fact that they mainly represented the city of San Estanislao (Santani), where Coronel was from. Depending on their social status, the members of these units were either university students or local peasants. Macheteros attacked and beat oppositionists, and sometimes committed murders. They also participated in Colorado Party events, creating a forceful entourage with machete-raised marches.

Minister of Justice and Labor José Eugenio Jacquet established the Anti-Communist Action Groups (Grupos de Acción Anticomunista, GAA). Having a function akin to that of the secret police, they cooperated with the civilian police and army units. They were mainly engaged in spying on the opposition and passed on the data to the political investigation bodies. They were responsible for many of the human rights violations during the Stronist period. Separate cells-groups were commanded by functionaries of the Ministry of Justice, such as Ruben Candia Amarilla, the future Minister of the Interior and Attorney General of Paraguay. In terms of structure and purpose, the GAA were compared with the Argentine Triple A.

The GAA tried to maintain a low profile unlike some of the other militias. Organizationally, they were linked to the World Anti-Communist League through the Paraguayan branch, which was led by Juan Manuel Frutos Fleitas and DNAT secret police chief Antonio Campos Alum.

Another branch of the Colorado militias was led by Ramón Aquino, the chairman of the 14th section of the Colorado Party in the Asunción slum district of Chacarita. The militias led by Aquino were called Garroteros (from the garrote). Garroteros were distinguished by a specific social composition - mostly militants of local organized crime groups and criminal youth from the slums. Observers referred to them as the "gangsters from Chacarita". They acted with typical methods of assault squads, coupled with an ideology of extreme anti-communism and populist attitudes in the version of criminals professing lawlessness. Garroteros' actions have gained wide notoriety: terror against those suspected of belonging to the Paraguayan Communist Party, beating of opposition students of the Catholic University of Asuncion and attacks on striking doctors.

=== Militant party split ===
The end of the 1980s was marked by a general political crisis in Paraguay and a split in Colorado. The Tradicionalistas ("traditionalists") faction advocated the removal of Stroessner from power and the implementation of some liberal democratic reforms in line with the global trend. The Militancias (“militants”) faction remained loyal to Stroessner, and wanted to keep the regime's security measures in place, and supported Stroessner's son Gustavo as his successor. The leaders of the Militancias were the Minister of the Interior Sabino Montanaro and the commanders of the party militias - José Eugenio Jacquet, Pastor Coronel and Ramón Aquino (Montanaro and Jacquet belonged to the so-called "Cuatrinomio de Oro", a group of politicians intimately connected to Stroessner). At the same time, Edgar Ynsfrán, who had been dismissed in 1966, supported the Tradicionalistas.

On August 1, 1987, the Militancias came out on top at the Colorado Convention and took control of the party. Gatherings of "traditionalists" were dispersed by militant Garroteros.

== After Stroessner ==
Alfredo Stroessner was finally deposed during the coup d'état of 2 and 3 February 1989, led by his former confidant, Andrés Rodríguez Pedotti, with the support of the army. Party militants did not have time to take action, and the "traditionalists" threw their support to Rodríguez and the new government began carrying out several long-demanded reforms. Political repression as a whole ceased. The new leadership of the Colorado Party officially renounced political violence. Party militias were disbanded. Some of the collaborators of the Stroessner regime, such as Pastor Coronel and José Eugenio Jacquet, were put on trial.

Since then, a new constitution came into force which prevented the President from being re-elected, as a way to prevent Stroessner's abuses from happening again in the country. Paramilitary forces ceased being a political tool and have not made a comeback.

In 2009, the Chilean-Paraguayan businessman Eduardo Avilés called for the revival of anti-communist paramilitary formations. Avilés was a member of the far-right Fatherland and Liberty organization in Chile in the early 1970s, and emigrated to Paraguay during the presidency of Salvador Allende. Avilés complained of a serious communist danger in the policies of the leftist President Fernando Lugo and publicly proposed the creation of the Comando Anticomunista Paraguayo - a callback to the paramilitary organizations of old. His comments have been sharply criticized as being of an outdated mindset. Fernando Lugo would later be impeached by parliament in a move that was described as a coup by neighboring nations, but without any interference by paramilitary units.

== See also ==
- Civil Defense Patrols
- Mano Blanca
- Organización Democrática Nacionalista
- Secret Anti-Communist Army
- Argentine Anticommunist Alliance
- Escuadrones de la muerte (Uruguay)
- Fuerzas Armadas de Regalado
- Village Scouts
- Red Gaurs
- Security Battalions
