= Carmen Casco de Lara Castro =

Paraguayan politician and activist (1918–1993)

- Born: Carmen Elida de Jesus Casco Miranda; 17 June 1918; Paraguay
- Died: 8 May 1993 (aged 74); Asunción, Paraguay
- Other names: Coca de Lara Castro; Carmen de Lara Castro
- Occupations: Educator; politician; human rights advocate
- Years active: 1939–1993
- Known for: Establishing one of the first independent human rights investigatory organizations in Latin America

Carmen Casco de Lara Castro (17 June 1918 – 8 May 1993) was a Paraguayan teacher, women's and human rights advocate, and politician. She established one of the first independent human rights organizations in Latin America and fought for both women's equality and an end to state-sponsored terrorism under the dictatorship of Alfredo Stroessner. She was influential in passing legislation for pay equity and maternity rights, as well as securing the repeal of laws curtailing basic human rights.

Born into an influential family, Casco was educated as a teacher and taught from the end of the 1930s to 1965. Having relatives sent into exile and witnessing the devastation of two wars, she was propelled into working to alleviate the suffering of those who were more marginalized than she. Initially she began working on issues involving women and political prisoners. When elected to serve on the 1967 Constitutional Assembly, she worked to have basic human rights added to the Paraguayan Constitution. One of the founders of the Commission for the Defense of Human Rights of Paraguay, she became its president and served in that capacity until her death. Unable to prosecute those who abused others' liberties, the organization focused on providing aid to victims but also compiled information on those who had been forcibly "disappeared".

Elected as a member of the Chamber of Deputies in 1968, Casco was an outspoken opponent of the dictatorial regime and was the target of state surveillance, imprisonment and intimidation. She served until 1977, when she resigned in protest to an amendment of the Constitution which allowed Stroessner unlimited terms as president. She was one of the parties involved in securing the release of political prisoners from the Ambush Concentration Camp. Throughout the 1980s, she traveled extensively trying to make the international community aware of human rights abuses in Paraguay so that they could apply pressure on the government to end reprisals against citizens. When Stroessner was ousted in 1989, she was elected as a Senator, serving in that capacity for the rest of her life. In 1992, when the archives of the Central Police Department of Investigations, known as the Terror Files, were unearthed, she became president of the Senate investigation into the records. The commission discovered that the Technical Affairs Department of the Ministry of the Interior was still operating and shut it down. That same year, she was honored by the United Nations for her contributions to human rights and humanity.

Casco died in 1993 and is remembered for her record of defending human rights. Schools and monuments in Paraguay bear her name, and her likeness adorns a stamp issued by the Paraguayan government in 2000.

== Early life ==
Carmen Elida de Jesus Casco Miranda was born on 17 June 1918 in Paraguay to Lídia Miranda Cueto and Fermín Casco Espínoza. She was baptized on 6 August 1918 in Asunción. (Note: The year of birth is given in some records as 1919 and her place of birth is listed as Concepción. Silva states that the family history indicates Casco was born in Asunción at La Casa Cueto Alvarenga, a part of a former Convento de San Francisco, which at the time was the home of her uncle, José Félix Estigarribia.) Her father made a military career in the Paraguayan army and fought in the Chaco War. Her mother's sister, Julia Miranda Cueto, was married to the military hero and later President of Paraguay, José Félix Estigarribia. One of seven children, she had four sisters and two brothers. Casco's family was well-known, of aristocratic background, and had high social and political standing.

Casco attended primary school at Colegio María Auxiliadora in Asunción and went on to study to be a teacher at La Providencia College. During her schooling, the Chaco War broke out, and though there was no fighting in Asunción, the family could not help but be affected since her father and uncle were both involved in the war. The ensuing political upheavals, sent her uncle Estigarribia, with whom her family were close, into exile. Her schooling included study of both French and Guarani languages, as well as the typical religious education.

== Early career and family ==
Casco began her career teaching civics and French at the College La Providencia and Normal School #3. She also taught at the Lyceum San Carlos. In 1940, Casco married Mariano Luís Lara Castro, who had been a soldier in the Chaco Wars, a lawyer and professor at the Catholic University of Asunción. Lara's father was Ramón Lara Castro, a journalist, president of the Paraguayan Institute of Historical Investigations and at one time served as the country's Minister of Foreign Affairs in Brazil. That same year, her uncle Estigarribia, who at the time was President of Paraguay was killed in an airplane crash, throwing the country into chaos. Both Casco and her husband adhered to the Liberal Party, even after it was banned by Estigarribia's successor, Higinio Morínigo. Morínigo, the only candidate on the 1943 ballot, ruled as an authoritarian president through persecution and banishment. Opposition resulted in the Paraguayan Civil War. When it ended in 1947, Casco became involved with helping political prisoners, as almost all of her maternal family had been exiled to Argentina and her paternal family lost all their property in Asunción. Her husband was also forced into exile, living briefly in Argentina and Uruguay, before his return to Paraguay in October 1947. Casco did not accompany him, as she was near the end of her third pregnancy and remained in Asunción alone with her sons Luis (born 1942) and Jorge (born 1945). Fernando (born 1948), was born soon after the Civil War ended and was followed by three more sons: José (born 1953), Fermín (born 1956), and Martín (born 1960). After both the Chaco War and the Civil War, her family lost their property and were sent into exile, leading Casco to become involved in human rights.

== Women's and human rights work ==
By her own account, Casco began working with women's groups around 1946, mainly because she had the support of her brother Adolfo. While as a woman she had no real political power, she felt she had been less marginalized than others. Initially, women helped each other with social service needs, but in 1953, she and other professional women founded the Intituto Cultural de Amparo a la Mujer (Cultural Institute of Refuge for Women). (Note: Most histories of Cacso omit this earlier entity, citing only the 1962 reorganization. Silva notes that an article appeared in La Tribuna stating that as of 7 November 1956 by order of the Ministry of the Interior all activity of the Cultural Institute of Refuge for Women was suspended, that their documents should be seized and that sanctions for engaging in illegal activities were pending against the group's members.) Made up primarily of teachers, with a few doctors and lawyers, their objective was to counsel women and assist them in overcoming societal impediments, such as poor pay, discrimination, poverty, lack of health care, though at times they provided material support. They also attempted to refer women to other benevolent associations that might be able to help them. In 1954, a coup d'etat brought the dictator Alfredo Stroessner to power and within two years, he issued a decree banning the Institute and placing the women who organized it on lists of suspicious persons. The group did not disband, but instead transformed into the Women's Department of the Liberal Party, though in fact, the Liberal Party was still an illegal organization, as the one-party state was limited to the Colorado Party. Women were not allowed to run for office or participate in any decision-making process. Instead they performed benevolent works, visiting prisoners, raising money, hosting meetings and providing food for functions.

The 1960s in Paraguay were characterized by repressive violence, armed attacks by soldiers and reprisals by guerrillas, which led to hundreds of deaths and imprisonment of political dissidents. Alternating waves of violence and conciliation served to strengthen fear and consolidate presidential power. In fact, women's suffrage was not achieved in Paraguay until 1961, and was not granted by means of women's agitation, as all forms of dissent were punished and democratization was extinguished. Rather, enfranchisement was granted because President Stroessner wanted to bolster his support with women who might influence voters. As early as 1962, together with María Campos Cervera, María Elena de Pérez, Mary del Pino, and Beatriz Méndez de Prieto, Casco established another organization they called Amparo a la Mujer (Refuge for Women) to continue the work they had begun in 1953. In 1963, a women's journal, Cuñatai, was launched, facilitating participation of women in the political arena, with Casco serving as the director. The journal survived for a year and a half. During all this time, Casco had continued teaching in various schools in Asunción, but in 1965 she stopped teaching and turned her focus to politics.

In 1965, Casco became the president of the Primero Congreso Feminino liberal (First Liberal Feminist Congress) in which both women and men discussed women's civil and political roles in Paraguayan society. They addressed women's education, employment, and civic and social issues. In 1966, a new Constitution was proposed; Casco ran and was elected to the Constitutional Assembly. Although she was a member of the Liberal Party, her election was facilitated by her family connections, her involvement in human rights, and her support for both conservative and anti-communist views. Replacing the Constitution of 1940, the new Constitution was notable in that it had provisions for protecting human rights, including banning denial of habeas corpus and protections from mistreatment or torture. It also allowed for political opposition to re-emerge, prompting several former political leaders to return from exile, and protected individual rights, including the freedoms of association and movement. However, to gain those provisions delegates had to continue the executive authority over both the legislative and judicial branches of government and grant President Stroessner the ability to hold two additional five-year terms as president.

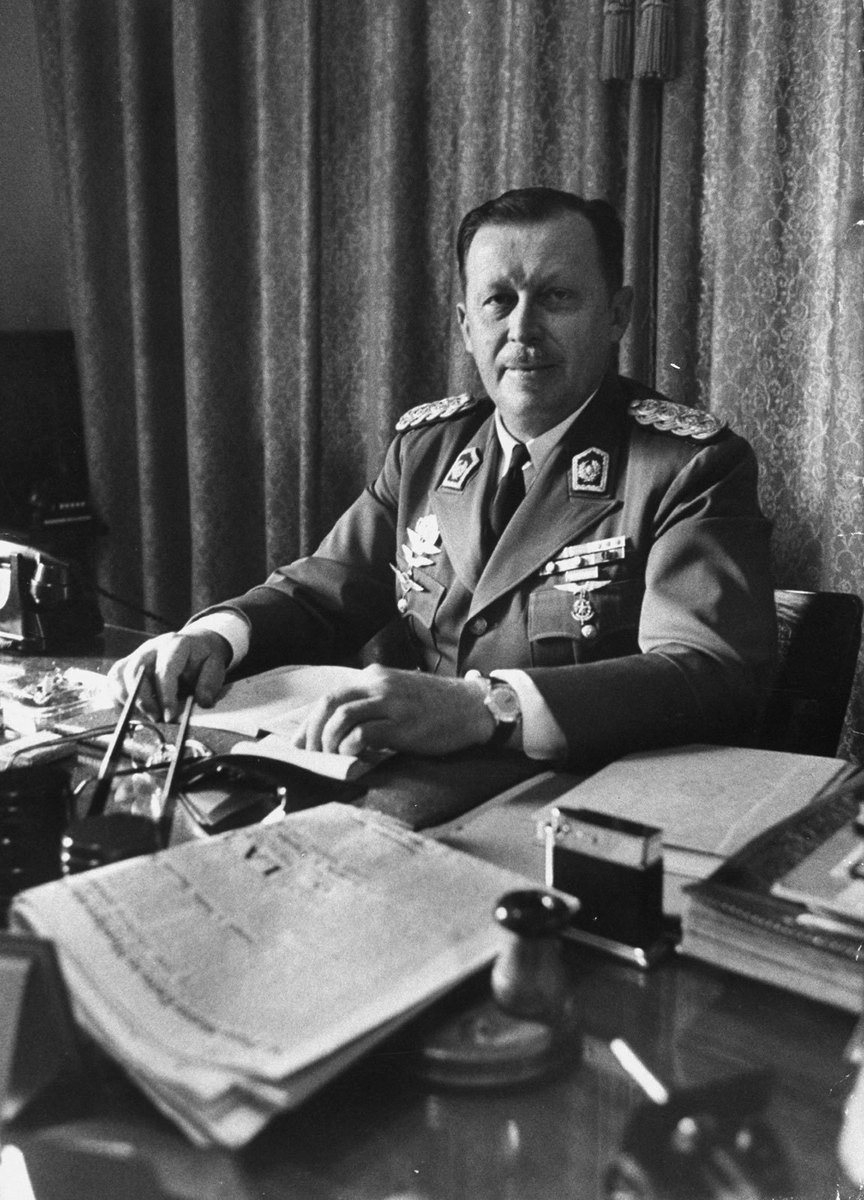
President Alfredo Stroessner

On 17 June 1967, Casco, Jerónimo Irala Burgos, Luís Alfonso Resck, and others founded the Comisión de Defensa de los Derechos Humanos del Paraguay (Commission for the Defense of Human Rights of Paraguay), "one of the first independent human rights organizations in Latin America". It was founded on Casco's forty-ninth birthday, a date which may have been chosen because it would not have raised suspicions. The Commission did not have much support at its inception and was viewed as subversive by the autocratic regime; however, it was created as part of the Constitutional revision. Casco was elected as the first president of the Commission and strictly adhered to the belief that all people were born equal and had the same rights, regardless of ideology, or differences in their economic, political, religious, or social status. During the Stroessner era, fear of reprisal curtailed the reporting of many human rights abuses. The few cases which were reported were often obstructed by the court system, which Stroessner controlled. For many years, the commission was the only human rights organization in the country which denounced the violence of the regime and attempted to assist political prisoners. To outside observers, the Commission appeared to be an ineffective, opposition party organ designed to denounce the government, but records in the Terror Files and memories of prisoners and their families report that Casco regularly helped families find lost members, placing notices of missing persons in newspapers (which also kept the public informed of frequent kidnappings) while denouncing state-sponsored terrorism thanks to her position on the Congress of Paraguay. She was assisted in these tasks by numerous men and women, who were willing to help if they could remain in the background. Under the guise of delivering food, these helpers, usually women, gathered information.

== Public service career ==
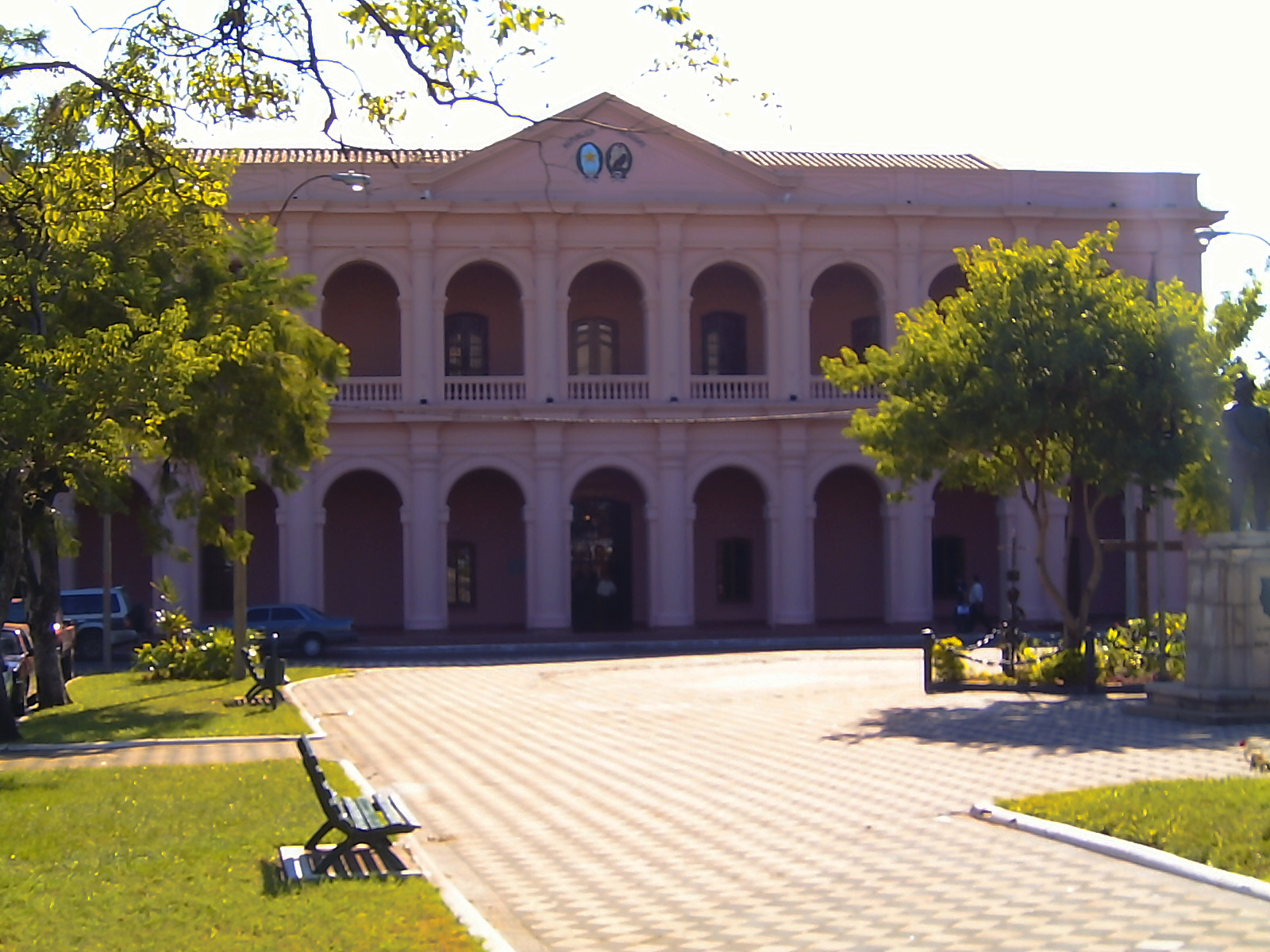
Chamber of Deputies, Asunción, Paraguay

Casco was elected as a National Deputy for the Radical Liberal Party in 1968, along with two women from the Colorado Party and re-elected in 1973, when two new female Deputies, Leonidas Paez de Virgilli and Ligia Prieto Centurión, were also elected. Almost immediately she began working to improve the situation of prisoners. At the time, prisoners were held in cells which had no beds or mattresses, no toilets, and were provided with no food. She demanded that the conditions improve and that all political prisoners be released. Simultaneously, through the commission, she met regularly with prisoners' families and provided them with material and moral support. Her outspokenness resulted in constant harassment, physical abuse from government operatives, repeated arrests, and vilification in the press. Two of her sons, as well as one of her brothers and a brother-in-law, were also arrested and tortured. Her mail was monitored, her telephone was tapped, and she was unable to obtain a passport. If she traveled abroad, she had to obtain international documents to do so. She successfully worked on legislation that would provide women with equal pay and maternity rights. In 1974, she submitted a bill to authorize 24 February as the Dia de la Mujer Paraguaya (Day of the Paraguayan Woman) to celebrate the contributions of women to the Triple Alliance War, when they donated their jewels to fund the defense of the country and war expenses. The date was chosen by historian Idalia Flores de Zarza in recognition of the date when the women of Asunción hosted the First Assembly of Women of the Americas.

"I speak to you as a parliamentarian and also as a mother who has suffered pain. We have a beautiful country, with verdant forests and crystal-clear rivers and streams. It is a paradise, but we need to add to its material progress a concern for the human problem. Let us turn it into a country without political prisoners, where justice will reign so fairly that it will shelter everyone, without the cancer of torture carried out by men who get drunk on another person's pain, as if they had taken drugs. With Christian love we should put an end to hate if we don't want it to have power over Paraguayans. May God grant that violence finds no inspiration in Paraguay. We must combat treasonous assaults in our country with justice and not with violence".

—Carmen de Lara Castro, 15 December 1977 resignation speech to the Members of the Congress of Paraguay, Asunción, Paraguay.

In 1977, when President Stroessner called for another Constitutional Assembly to allow indefinite re-election for the Paraguayan Presidency, Casco formed a protest by inviting leaders of the various liberal parties to unite in opposition to the regime. When they failed to form a coalition, she urged them to boycott the election and resigned her seat as a Deputy. In 1978, Casco joined with Carlos Alberto González, Domingo Laíno, Miguel Ángel Martínez Yaryes and others to form the Authentic Radical Liberal Party. The same year, in celebration of the 30th anniversary of the Universal Declaration of Human Rights, she organized and hosted the First Congress of Human Rights. The conference was held in the fonoplatea (live studio) of Radio Caritas, despite its being prohibited by the regime. The event was attended by over 400 people; according to the police dossier on the event, there were many international participants.

Around the same time, she began working with activists from the Juventud Paraguaya por los Derechos Humanos (JPDH) (Paraguayan Youth for Human Rights) organization. JPDH aimed to free all political prisoners by Christmas 1978, especially those held in the Emboscada Campo de Concentración (Ambush Concentration Camp), which included such figures as Alfredo Alcorta, Antonio Maidana, and Julio Rojas, members of the Paraguayan Communist Party, who had been arrested for their actions during the 1958 Paraguayan general strike. Combining their skills, Casco and Resck used international pressure, and Roberto Paredes led a raid by the JPDH on the Palacio de los López, to force the closure of the camp. The two groups worked together, though some members of the JPDH thought the privilege accorded to Casco because of her family position made her both less willing to take risks and unable to relate to issues of the masses; conversely, she felt that the subversive ideologies of the radicals within JPDH would undermine the work of the commission.

Though there was no immediate reaction from the government to these actions, in 1979, Casco was exiled from the Radical Liberal Party, brought before the judge of the Criminal Court of First Instance and denounced by the government. Despite these attempts to intimidate her, Casco was unrepentant, hosting two additional Human Rights Congresses during the dictatorship in 1982 and 1987. She regularly participated in the Inter-American Commission on Human Rights review process and on more than one occasion was personally the subject of concern for having her rights violated. Casco also began traveling internationally in the 1980s, attending conferences on human rights. In 1980, she traveled to London at the invitation of Liberal International to discuss human rights in her country. She was arrested in 1981 after returning from a trip to Germany and again in 1988 when returning from a trip to Spain. It was alleged that she had taken part in a march, La Convergência Nacional por Los Derechos Humanos (The National Convergence for Human Rights), held to commemorate the 40th anniversary of the Universal Declaration of Human Rights, but in reality, she was arrested in the airport returning from Europe. Stroessner was finally overthrown by a coup d'etat led by Andrés Rodríguez in 1989 and in the election which followed Casco was elected to serve in the Senate. She introduced measures to repeal Laws 209, the Law for Defense of the Public Peace and Personal Freedom which made dissent or fostering dissent a crime, and 294, the Law for the Defense of Democracy which outlawed communism and armed rebellion against the government.

In December 1992, the archives of Stroessner's organized human rights abuses, known as the Terror Files were uncovered. Contained in the collection of documents created by the Departmento de Investigaciones del la Policia Central (DIPC) (Central Police Department of Investigations), were detailed records on forced disappearances, kidnappings, murder, political prisoners, surveillance, and torture. The records provided documentation that regular reports of the activity of the DIPC were submitted to the president and that Paraguay had participated in Operation Condor, a network of South American countries which clandestinely exchanged political prisoners. On 23 December 1992, the day following their discovery, Casco formed a parliamentary delegation to investigate the evidence found. Elected to serve as president of the Senate's Human Rights Commission, the delegation discovered that the Technical Affairs Department of the Ministry of the Interior was still operating an illegal detention center under the direction of Antonio Campos Alum and took steps to shut down the operation of state terrorism. She was honored by the United Nations for her contributions to human rights and humanity in 1992, along with her husband.

== Death and legacy ==
In April 1993, suffering from complications of diabetes, Casco entered the hospital in Asunción, where she died on 8 May 1993. After her remains were laid in state at the National Congress, she was buried in the cemetery at Recoleta. In 2000, a commemorative stamp was issued by the Paraguayan Government bearing her likeness and honoring her commitment to women's rights. A high school, Colegio Nacional Doña Carmen Casco de Lara Castro, San Pedro, Paraguay was named in her honor, as was a technical college in the city of Itauguá. There is a street in Encarnación which bears her name. In 2006, a tribute was held to her memory in the Carmen Casco de Lara Castro Square of the San Pablo neighborhood in Asunción. This square had formerly been named after Stroessner and was renamed when a bill to remove honors bestowed upon him was passed by the legislature. Casco has been recognized with programs recognizing her work for Paraguay's Human Rights Week, Paraguayan Women's Day, and International Women's Day.

Scholarship from Argentina, Brazil and France has evaluated the importance of her career in the development of women's agency, human rights and emerging democracy after the dictatorship in Paraguay. Comparisons between her experiences in Paraguay and those of other leading women figures in other countries, who also emerged from dictatorships, give insight into how upper and middle-class women were able to take the lead in attaining rights in their countries.
