= Antonio Campos Alum =

Head of the National Directorate of Technical Affairs
- In office 1957–1992

Personal details
- Born: 16 July 1919 Paraguarí, Paraguay
- Died: 14 February 2012 (aged 92) Fernando de la Mora, Paraguay
- Party: National Republican Association – Colorado Party
- Occupation: Politician, torturer

Antonio Campos Alum (16 July 1919 – 14 February 2012) was a Paraguayan politician and head of the National Directorate of Technical Affairs (Dirección Nacional de Asuntos Técnicos, DNAT), a law enforcement agency during the dictatorship of Alfredo Stroessner.

== Early life ==
Antonio Campos Alum was born in the agricultural department of Paraguarí, a conservative peasant region. He received a degree in law at the University of Asunción, and began a career as a lawyer. A staunch anti-communist, he became a member of the Colorado Party, the main conservative political force in the country.

Following the 1947 civil war, Paraguay became a one-party state under the Colorado Party, with most opposition groups being banned and driven into exile. In 1954, General Alfredo Stroessner launched a coup d'état and took control of the government. Campos Alum became a strong supporter of the new regime, and began serving in the Ministry of Internal Affairs as the General Secretary of the Ministry.

== Under Stroessner ==
In 1956 President Stroessner established a special service of the secret police, subordinate to the Ministry of Internal Affairs - the National Directorate of Technical Affairs (Dirección Nacional de Asuntos Técnicos, DNAT). Robert Thierry, a Pentagon official and veteran of the Korean War was sent from the United States to help the Stroessner regime set up the new organization. When selecting the employees, Lieutenant Colonel Thierry paid special attention to the lawyer Antonio Campos Alum. In 1957, Campos Alum completed an internship in the United States. Upon his return to Paraguay, he was commissioned by Stroessner to lead the DNAT. Antonio Campos Alum held this position for 35 years - throughout the whole history of the department.

As director of the DNAT, Antonio Campos Alum was primarily concerned with the suppression of the anti-government insurgency. The 1958 elections gave Stroessner his second Presidential term. The vote was fixed to favor the regime and the opposition blossomed into a guerrilla insurgency soon afterwards. Sponsored by exiled Liberals and Febreristas, small bands of armed men began to slip across the border from Argentina. Venezuela sent large amounts of aid to these groups starting in 1958. The following year, the new Cuban government under Fidel Castro also provided assistance to the United National Front.

The suppression of the armed opposition was led by the Minister of the Interior Edgar Ynsfrán, at that time one of the key men of the regime. Antonio Campos Alum was one of the closest collaborators of Ynsfrán, and the DNAT played an important role in the suppression of anti-government movements. In 1966, Ynsfrán was dismissed, but this did not affect either the position of the DNAT or the status of Campos Alum - he became one of the deputies of the new head of the Ministry of Internal Affairs, Sabino Augusto Montanaro.

Campos Alum formed an effective network of informers. The headquarters of the DNAT combined the functions of a prison with that of an interrogation chamber. DNAT agents identified, arrested and killed those suspected of being members of the Paraguayan Communist Party (PCP) or involved in communist activities. All the while, the concept of “communism” was interpreted broadly: liberal human rights activists, student activists, and participants in peasant land riots were persecuted on this basis, even if in most cases they were not members of the party nor did they ideologically identify as communists. As a matter of fact, members of the Communist Party made up a relatively minor part of the repressed. The DNAT's actions were seen as pre-emptive suppression of pro-communist activity. So, in 1963, on Campos Alum's instructions, the student organization Federación de Estudiantes Democráticos Revolucionarios (FEDRE) was crushed, which, alongside the youth wings of the Febreristas, MOPOKO and Christian Democrats, planned to organize protests against the re-election of Stroessner. Campos Alum qualified FEDRE as a side branch of the PCP and subjected it to severe repression (in official DNAT official, the term dispersión - “scattering” was used to refer to such actions). In November 1977, Antonio Campos Alum personally interrogated and tortured human rights activist Martin Almada. Subsequently, Almada, who later would be the one to discover the Archives of Terror, characterized Campos Alum as a "monster". Thousands of Paraguayans became victims of kidnappings, arrests, torture and murders committed by DNAT agents during this time, ad Antonio Campos Alum is ranked among the key figures of state terror in the Stressner era alongside Pastor Coronel. The word La Técnica - Technical Institute, which colloquially denoted DNAT, acquired an ominous meaning in Paraguay.

The functions of the DNAT were not limited to political investigation and repression within Paraguay. This department was also charged with foreign intelligence and counterintelligence. The DNAT was the main structure for Paraguay's participation in the continental anti-communist Operation Condor. Antonio Campos Alum, along with Alejandro Fretes Dávalos, served as the main Paraguayan operative within the Condor framework. It was within this framework, in cooperation with the Argentine SIDE, that Martin Almada was captured. Campos Alum also held multiple organizational meetings with anti-communist organizations from other nations in Latin America during this time.

Antonio Campos Alum was not only a functionary of the secret police, but also a public and political figure of the Stroessner regime. Having no penchant for public speaking, he focused on organizational activities. Campos Alum headed the Comisión de Entidades Cívicas Anticomunistas (CECA) - a set of pro-Stroessner trade unions, student associations, cultural circles and Catholic organizations. Antonio Campos Alum was also vice-president of the regional branch of the World League for Freedom and Democracy anti-communist organization, the Latin American Anti-Communist Confederation. The only known speech by Antonio Campos Alum was at the XII Conference of the League in April 1979. The conference was held in Asunción, chaired by Juan Manuel Frutos Fleitas, one of Stroessner's closest collaborators. In his speech, Antonio Campos Alum called for the creation in Latin America of "an alliance of nationalist governments, before which the intrigues of Carterocommunism will become powerless". This reflected the extremely negative attitude of the Stronists towards the American administration of Jimmy Carter.

== Later life ==
Over the course of the 1980s opposition to the Stroessner regime began forming within the Colorado Party, culminating in the coup d'état of 2 and 3 February 1989, when Stroessner was deposed and replaced by his former confidant, Andrés Rodríguez Pedotti, with the support of the army. A number of Stroessner's collaborators, including Sabino Montonaro and Pastor Coronel, were brought to trial. However, initially, this did not affect Antonio Campos Alum, who kept his position as head of the DNAT under the new government. Nonetheless, the DNAT was ultimately abolished on December 23, 1992. Campos Alum, by now retired, fled to Brazil. In Brazil, Campos Alum maintained links with anti-communist figures.

Campos Alum eventually returned to Paraguay, settling in the city of Fernando de la Mora and maintaining a low profile. Leftist organizations and human rights activists demanded he be put on trial following his return, including Martín Almada. This was vigorously opposed by the police commissioner Rolando Agustín Alum, the nephew of Antonio Campos Alum, who once served in the DNAT under his uncle. In the end, attempts to bring Campos Alum to trial did not produce any results.

Antonio Campos Alum died in Fernando de la Mora in 2012 at the age of 92.
