= Guión Rojo =

Paramilitary group involved in the 1947 Paraguayan civil war

- Flag of the Colorado Party
- Leaders: Juan Natalicio González (leader); Edgar Ynsfrán; Juan Manuel Frutos Fleitas
- Founded: 1942
- Dissolved: 1966
- Active regions: Paraguay
- Ideology: Ultranationalism; Falangism; Fascism; Anti-communism
- Part of: National Republican Association – Colorado Party
- Wars: Paraguayan Civil War (1947)

The Guión Rojo (Red Banner) was a Paraguayan paramilitary organization of the 1930-1950s, which was formed in 1942 as the paramilitary wing of the Colorado Party. It united supporters of Colorado leader Juan Natalicio González, far-right nationalists, anti-communists and adherents of Falangist and pro-fascist ideas. It played a prominent role under the dictatorial regime of the 1940s, in the civil war of 1947, the subsequent political struggle and the establishment of Alfredo Stroessner's dictatorship.

== Background ==
Paramilitary formations have a long association with Paraguayan politics. A surge in their activity came in the 1930s. This was facilitated by the entry into politics of many veterans of the Chaco War and the political crisis of the February Revolution of 1936, described as "a joint Marxist - fascist coup against the liberal government". By the end of the decade, in general, two opposing blocs had formed: on the right the Colorado Party, and on the left the Liberal and Revolutionary Febrerista, with the Communist Party adjoining them. The Paraguayan army and state apparatus had their own goals, putting forward ambitious authoritarian politicians from their midst.

In the countryside, the conservative Colorado Party relied on 15,000-strong Py Nandi peasant militia. These formations were recruited mainly from the rural poor (in the Guarani language, py nandi means "barefoot ones") who held strongly conservative and anti-communist views. The Py Nandi militants were notable for their particular brutality in reprisals against left-wing activists. The Spanish Civil War, with its ideologically driven militias and foreign intervention, prompted the Paraguayan far right to strengthen the paramilitary force.

== Creation and ideology ==
In 1938, Colorado leader Juan Natalicio González decided to reform the party's paramilitary structure. On the basis of the rural Py Nandi and the urban GACs (Grupos de Acción Colorada - Colorado Action Groups), another militia was created in 1942, called Guión Rojo (meaning Red Banner, as the color red is historically associated with Paraguayan conservatism). In this new organization, González saw an instrument to further his populist socio-economic doctrine, close to corporatism as well as his own ambitions for the presidency.

Politically, Guión Rojo differed little from Py Nandi. However, there were noticeable differences in social composition and organizational structure. Guión Rojo included not only peasants, representatives of the low and middle bourgeoisie in the cities, and right-wing intellectuals. The structure was more strict, closer to the Colorado branches, with direct subordination to party functionaries and personally to Juan Natalicio González. González, a well-known intellectual, journalist, historian and writer, was inclined towards political romanticism. González combined national populist views with the idea of a Colorado corporate fraternity. Guión Rojo militants understood his slogan "Colorado will not be poor" as a sanction for permissiveness.

== "Army of Colorado" ==
In 1940, the military dictatorship of Higinio Morínigo was established in Paraguay. His regime held strong nationalist and anti-communist beliefs and showed sympathy for the Axis powers. Therefore, the Colorado Party, led by González, supported the Morínigo regime. Since 1942, the Guión Rojo acted as a pro-government power structure. The militants of the organization carried out attacks and took part in violence against liberal and febrerista opposition figures. Opposition newspapers were shut down and their publishers exiled. At the same time, relying on the "Gionists", González strengthened his own positions, gradually intercepting the levers of real power from Morinigo.

In 1947, civil war broke out in Paraguay. A coalition of liberals, febreristas and communists, with the support of much of the army, tried to overthrow Morínigo. The military superiority was on the side of the opposition. The detachments of Guión Rojo and Py Nandi became the main force of the pro-government side. They played a very important role in the war, allowing Morinigo to hold out until the mobilization of reinforcements, organized with Argentine help. After the defeat of the opposition, the Guión Rojo militants carried out brutal reprisals throughout the country against the defeated rebels.

In February 1948, Juan Natalicio González was elected President of Paraguay. The political landscape had changed: Higinio Morínigo tried to prevent him from taking office. In the spring and summer of 1948, Guión Rojo organized armed uprisings, which resulted in the overthrow of Morinigo and the ascent of González into power. The Guionists also participated in the suppression of the coup attempt in October 1948. However, following another coup, in January 1949, González was removed from power and emigrated from Paraguay.

González's departure from politics reduced the Guión Rojo's activity. However, the structure continued to exist, consolidating Colorado's far-right forces and continuing its tradition of strong anti-communism and pro-fascist sympathies. Among the Guión Rojo's activists and ideologues were Edgar Ynsfrán, who romanticized the violent methods of the militants as "a barbaric struggle for the people's truth", and Juan Manuel Frutos Fleitas, who later became the head of the Paraguayan branch of the World League for Freedom and Democracy anti-communist organization. Eventually, the group would come to support Paraguayan General Alfredo Stroessner, who was ideologically close to them and launched his own coup in 1954 to seize power for himself.

== Decline ==
The Guión Rojo were strongly associated with Juan Natalicio González, whom Stroessner considered a dangerous competitor. Even though Natalicio did not engage in oppositional activities, the new head of state treated him with suspicion. Therefore, the authorities did not encourage the organizational activity of Guión Rojo. However, members such as Edgar Ynsfrán Juan Manuel Frutos Fleitas became high ranking government ministers and ideologues of the new dictatorship, which was to last for 35 years. After the death of Natalicio in 1966, the organization itself ceased to exist. However, the functions of Guión Rojo continued to be performed by Py Nandi and other Stronist assault brigades - Pastor Coronel's Macheteros de Santani, Ramón Aquino's Garroteros and Eugenio Jacquet's Grupos de Acción Anticomunista.

The term "Guión Rojo" became collective name for the far right wing of the Colorado Party. One of the constituent groups of the modern Colorado Party bears the name Movimiento Guión Rojo. Its leaders Miguel Angel Sithar and Nya Delo are positioned as bearers of the tradition of the "real Colorado"
