= Ramón Aquino =

Paraguayan far-right politician (1934–2015)

Personal details
- Born: 10 June 1934 Asunción, Paraguay
- Died: 1 April 2015 (aged 80) Asunción, Paraguay
- Party: National Republican Association – Colorado Party
- Occupation: Politician, torturer

Ramón Aquino (June 10, 1934 - April 1, 2015) was a Paraguayan far-right politician from the Colorado Party, known as the leader of the Garroteros militia during the dictatorship of Alfredo Stroessner.

== Early life and career ==
Ramón Aquino was born in 1934 in Asunción, in the neighborhood of Chacarita. This part of the Paraguayan capital is known to this day as a slum area, a hotbed of poverty and crime. Tourist guides categorize the area as "not recommended to visit at any time". Chacarita was even poorer and more crime-ridden in the 20th century. Not much is known about Aquino's early life, but according to some reports, he was involved in the criminal organizations operating in Chacarita during this time. Upon joining the Colorado Party, he became the party's main spokesman for the neighborhood, and in turn, received a legal education through his membership.

In 1966, Ramón Aquino became head of the Colorado Section 14, a territorial party organization in Chacarita. He held this position for almost a quarter of a century and earned a reputation among supporters as "the great fighter of Colorado". He was a member of Colorado's governing body, the Board of Governors, and was a personal friend of President Alfredo Stroessner. Approximately three-quarters of Chacarita's population was officially registered with the Colorado Party, and almost 100% of local voters voted in every election for President Stroessner and the Colorado candidates.

The party headquarters turned into the center of district life, where meetings were constantly held to make decisions on socio-economic, socio-political, cultural and everyday issues. Aquino himself became a district "cacique", the informal master of Chacarita. For employment, business licensing, admission to studies, use of municipal medical care, his personal approval was required. At the same time, under the leadership of Aquino, a social infrastructure appeared for the first time in the district - a free clinic, a cultural and rehabilitation center, and sports grounds. Because of this he was able to build up a reputation as a benefactor, and he enjoyed high popularity in Chacarita.

== Garroteros ==
The Paraguayan political tradition has long included paramilitary wings for its political parties. This is especially characteristic of the Colorado Party, with its py nandi peasant militia, Guión Rojo detachments, and other party militia formations. The Stroessner regime also created its own civilian detachments.

Ramón Aquino was among the chief organizers of the Colorado Battlegroups (along with the Chief of the Police Investigation Department, Pastor Coronel, Minister of Justice, José Eugenio Jacquet). He recruited his militants in the well-known criminal organizations of Chacarita. At the suggestion of Aquino himself, they received the name Garroteros (from the garrote). The group was tightly organized and armed with clubs and pieces of metal pipes. Opponents of Stronism singled out Ramón Aquino's formations in particular, calling them "the gangsters from Chacarita".

One of the most infamous acts of the garroteros occurred on September 12, 1972, when they suppressed anti-government protests at the Catholic University of Asuncion by brutally beating up rebellious students. Aquino, who was personally involved in the violence, said the goal was to "pacify the debate." After this event, he received the black humor nickname Moderador de la Universidad - the moderator of the university.

On April 24, 1986, the doctors and nurses of the Asuncion Clinical Hospital went on strike, requesting a pay increase. They were supported by many patients. The hospital building was blockaded by the police. Ramón Aquino considered what was happening a "communist provocation" and arrived at the head of the garroteros. The firmness of one of the nurses, a Polish-born nun named Yuliana, who yelled at them "enter only over my dead body," convinced Aquino to retreat. However, on May 2, the attack was repeated, and several striking doctors as well as some patients were savagely beaten by garroteros.

In the late 1980s, a split appeared in the Colorado Party between two factions, the tradicionalistas ("traditionalists", supporters of liberal reforms led by Luis Maria Argaña and Edgar Ynsfrán) and militancias ("militants", loyal supporters of Stroessner led by Sabino Augusto Montanaro and Ramón Aquino). Aquino advocated the maximum tightening of the regime, the continuation of Alfredo Stroessner's rule for life and the inheritance of dictatorial power by the president's son Gustavo Stroessner Jr. - Aquino's slogan during this clash was “After Stroessner, Stroessner!” On August 1, 1987, the Militancias came out on top at the Colorado Convention and took control of the party. Gatherings of "traditionalists" were dispersed by militant Garroteros. On November 19, 1988, Ramon Aquino was excommunicated by the Catholic Church for his role in the political violence.

== Later years ==
Alfredo Stroessner was finally deposed during the coup d'état of 2 and 3 February 1989, led by his former confidant, Andrés Rodríguez Pedotti, with the support of the army. Party militants did not have time to take action, and the "traditionalists" threw their support to Rodríguez and the new government began carrying out several long-demanded reforms. Political repression as a whole ceased. The new leadership of the Colorado Party officially renounced political violence. Party militias were disbanded. Some of the collaborators of the Stroessner regime, such as Pastor Coronel and José Eugenio Jacquet, were put on trial.

Ramón Aquino categorically rejected the new order. He was one of the few members of the Colorado Board of Governors who opposed Rodríguez's presidency and program. As a result, in 1990, Aquino was forcibly removed from the leadership board of the Colorado Party, and removed from the party post in Chacarita. From then on, his political influence declined sharply, however, he was not imprisoned or forced to emigrate unlike some of the other collaborators of Stroessner, and continued to great yield influence in Chacarita.

Ramón Aquino died on April 1, 2015, at the age of 80. He was married, and his son Alberto Ramon Aquino Jr. is a well-known lawyer in Paraguay.
