= Edgar Ynsfrán =

Paraguayan politician (1921-1991)

Edgar Linneo Ynsfrán Doldán

Interior Minister of Paraguay
- In office 1956–1966
- Preceded by: Tomás Romero Pereira
- Succeeded by: Sabino Augusto Montanaro

Personal details
- Born: 9 December 1921; Asunción, Paraguay
- Died: 2 November 1991; Asunción, Paraguay
- Political party: National Republican Association – Colorado Party

Edgar Linneo Ynsfrán Doldán (December 9, 1921 – November 2, 1991) was a Paraguayan politician who held important governmental posts during the dictatorship of Alfredo Stroessner. He became Minister of the Interior in Paraguay in 1956, and held key roles in the severe political repressions of the late 50s and early 60s in the country. He was dismissed from his post in 1966 and retired from politics until the mid-1980s, when he emerged as one of the leaders of the anti-Stroessner movement within the military and the Colorado Party.

== Life and career ==
Edgar Ynsfrán was born in Asunción on 9 December 1921, and was the eldest of the four children of the marriage between Linneo Ynsfrán and Inocencia Doldán, coming from a middle-class family. He had three brothers, Walter, Gladys and Oscar Facundo. He completed his primary studies at the Colegio San José in Asunción, while he finished his bachelor's studies at the Colegio Nacional Capitalino. His university life revolved around the Faculty of Engineering of the University of Buenos Aires and later, in the Faculty of Law and Social Sciences of the National University of Asunción. From the second half of the 1940s he made a career in the civil service.

Ynsfrán was General Secretary of the Ministry of Finance, Secretary of the Ministry of Agriculture and the Ministry of the Interior. He taught constitutional law at a prestigious metropolitan college, and became an employee of the Paraguayan embassy in France. In 1948, he was a member of the Paraguayan delegation that participated in the Paris meeting of the third session of the UN General Assembly, where the Universal Declaration of Human Rights was adopted.

Politically, Ynsfrán was a staunch nationalist and anti-communist, sympathetic to fascist corporatism. He was a member of the conservative wing of the Colorado Party. During the civil war of 1947, he participated on the side of the government, but supported not so much President Higinio Morínigo as Colorado leader Juan Natalicio González. Ynsfrán was a member of the ultra-right paramilitary Guión Rojo, the paramilitary wing of the Colorado Party. The Guión Rojo was created in 1942 by Colorado leader Juan Natalicio González, based on the already existing Py Nandi rural militia and the urban GACs (Grupos de Acción Colorada - Colorado Action Groups). Ynsfrán referred to the Colorado paramilitaries - who were particularly infamous in their brutality against left-wing activists in the countryside - as the lifeblood of the party, hailing their "barbaric" tendencies and calling them a "people's movement for the truth", contrasting the village far-right militants with "intellectual slackers who sat in cafes".

Ynsfrán was married twice: he had a daughter from his first wife, and two sons from his second wife.

== Under Stroessner ==
The ideological and political views of Ynsfrán naturally led him to the camp of supporters of General Alfredo Stroessner in the tumultuous years of the Federico Chaves presidency. In 1954, Ynsfrán strongly supported the coup d'état that deposed Chaves and made Stroessner the dictator of Paraguay. For his part, Stroessner drew closer to the young energetic lawyer. From 1954 to 1956, Ynsfrán served as legal adviser to the Paraguayan Ministry of Internal Affairs, then as the chief of police in Asunción. In 1956 President Stroessner appointed Ynsfrán the Minister of the Interior of Paraguay. In this post, Ynsfrán became the dictator's closest collaborator, and one of the key figures in molding Stronism.

Ynsfrán organized an extensive system of police control and political surveillance. Two special services were organized under the Ministry of the Interior: the Department of Investigations of the Metropolitan Police (Departamento de Investigaciones de la Policía de la Capital, DIPC) under the leadership of Pastor Coronel, and the National Directorate of Technical Affairs (Dirección Nacional de Asuntos Técnicos, DNAT) directed by Antonio Campos Alum. Both units specialized in political repression.

Thousands of opponents of the Stressner regime were arrested - communists, liberals, Catholics, socialists-Febrerists, and dissidents from the Colorado Party itself. Many of them were subjected to severe torture. In the late 1950s, Ynsfrán led the crackdown on a leftist guerrilla movement backed by Argentina, Venezuela and Cuba. He coordinated the actions of the army's death squads, secret police and the Py Nandi peasant militia, demonstrating great cruelty. In 1962, a conspiracy by a group of junior army officers in support of exiled Colorado dissident Epifanio Méndez Fleitas was discovered and brutally suppressed. Almost all opposition to Stroessner was destroyed or driven deep underground. In later years, Edgar Ynsfrán admitted to his role in crushing the opposition, but categorically denied involvement in the torture of prisoners.

In the ultra-right Stronist structure, Ynsfrán represented the most extreme trend, close not only to fascism, but also to National Socialism. He played an important role in providing asylum to Josef Mengele, and personally alluded to the presence of Martin Bormann in Paraguay. There were rumors within the country that Ynsfrán was secretly hiding Adolf Hitler himself.

Ynsfrán was distinguished by a deep personal devotion to Alfredo Stroessner. It was he who led the solemn ceremony of founding the city of Puerto Flor de Lis, renamed Puerto Presidente Stroessner (now Ciudad del Este). Ynsfrán strongly defended Stroessner from attacks by the foreign press, which led to diplomatic conflicts with Argentina and Uruguay. In times when Alfredo Stroessner was away from Paraguay, Ynsfrán was in charge of the country's general administration on at least five occasions (June and September 1956; September 1957; April and then May 1958). He additionally served as the vice-president of the Colorado Party. However, relations between the president and the trusted minister gradually became more complicated. Stroessner was no longer satisfied with Ynsfrán's excessive independence and ideological-driven tenure. For example, Ynsfrán provided asylum to Argentina's deposed President Juan Domingo Perón. Stroessner soon insisted on expelling Perón from Paraguay.

== Fall from power and later years ==
Having all but crushed domestic opposition, Stroessner began a process of "liberalization" where some political parties other than the Colorado Party were, in theory, allowed to exist in the country. This did not change the nature of the regime, as these opposition parties were opposition in name only, but nonetheless was used by Stroessner as a response to the increasingly loud international outcry over the human rights abuses committed by his government. Under "liberalization", Ynsfrán, the master of the machinery of terror, began to outlive his usefulness to Stroessner. Ynsfrán opposed political liberalization and was unhappy with Stroessner's increasingly clear intention to stay as President for life. A May 1966 police corruption scandal gave Stroessner a convenient way to dismiss Ynsfrán in November from the post of head of the Ministry of Internal Affairs. He was succeeded by Sabino Augusto Montanaro, a member of the ruling "Cuatrinomio de Oro", who remained a minister until the end of the Stronist regime.

After his dismissal, Ynsfrán retired from politics. He dedicated himself to writing memoirs and completing a large library (bequeathed to the state). He returned to political activity only in the second half of the 1980s, leading an opposition group to Stroessner within the Colorado Party, known as "group of the 34". In a CIA report, Edgar Ynsfrán was mentioned as a potential successor to Stroessner. This movement grew in strength until the coup d'état of 2 and 3 February 1989, when Stroessner was deposed and replaced by his former confidant, Andrés Rodríguez Pedotti, with the support of the army. By this time, Ynsfrán had come to favor a more humane approach to government, a marked turnabout from his role in the most repressive phase of the Stronato. While he did not participate in the practical preparation of the coup, he was its ideologist and intellectual inspirer.

After the coup, Ynsfrán went to occupy a seat at the Chamber of Senators of Paraguay.

== Death ==
Ynsfrán died two years after the fall of Stroessner, on 2 November 1991, in Asunción. He was 69 years old.
