= United Liberation Front =

United Liberation Front may refer to:

- United Liberation Front of Assam, a separatist group in India
- United Liberation Front of Western South East Asia, an insurgent group in Northeast India
- Katarist United Liberation Front, a political party in Bolivia
- Tamil United Liberation Front, political party in Sri Lanka

== See also ==
- United National Liberation Front, a separatist group in Manipur, India
- United National Liberation Front (Paraguay), a Paraguayan resistance group
- United Liberation Forces, a Turkish expatriates' militia in the Syrian Civil War
- United Liberation Forces of Oromia, see Oromo people
