= Rafael Franco =

President of Paraguay from 1936 to 1937

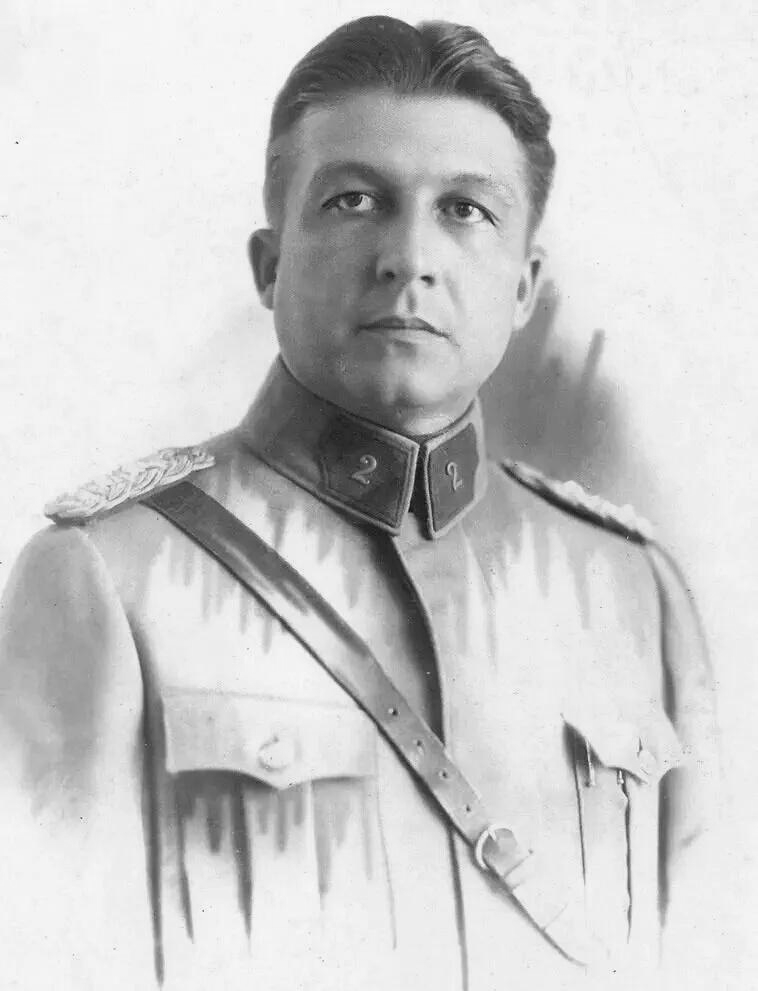
- Portrait, 1936

33rd President of Paraguay
- In office 20 February 1936 – 13 August 1937
- Preceded by: Eusebio Ayala
- Succeeded by: Félix Paiva

Personal details
- Born: 22 October 1896 Asunción
- Died: 16 September 1973 (aged 76) Asunción
- Party: National Revolutionary Party
- Spouse: Deidamia Solalinde

Military service
- Allegiance: Paraguay
- Branch/service: Paraguayan Army
- Rank: Colonel (1933); Major General (2011)
- Battles/wars: Chaco War

Rafael de la Cruz Franco Ojeda (October 22, 1896 – September 16, 1973) was a Paraguayan military officer, politician and statesman who served as President of Paraguay after the February Revolution, from February 20, 1936, to August 13, 1937. He was the historical leader and founder of the National Revolutionary Party (Revolutionary Febrerista Party since 1951).

Under his presidency, he implemented Paraguay's first major land reform (the confiscation, and breaking up, of some large private land holdings) and introduced a number of pro-labor reforms.

== Early life and education ==
Franco was born in Asunción on October 22, 1896, in the barrio of Santísima Trinidad.

He was the son of Federico Franco and Marcelina Ojeda. His father was a professor of mathematics at the School of Agronomy, founded by Moisés Santiago Bertoni, and in 1940 she was transferred to San Lorenzo.

He was married to Deidamia Solalinde and they had six children. After conducting his basic studies, Franco entered the Military College in 1915.

== Military career ==
Franco's first assignment, with the rank of second lieutenant, was to Encarnación in the Department of Itapúa under the command of Colonel Pedro Mendoza. On May 9, 1921, Franco was promoted to first lieutenant in the infantry and, on August 13 of the same year he was appointed commander of the machine gun group, with its seat in Asunción.

He was commander of Infantry Regiment No. 5 under General Eduvigis Diaz, based in Bahía Negra. On August 13, 1924, Franco was promoted to captain. On February 10, 1926, he was appointed commander of the company cadets of the Military College. He was assigned important tasks, such as training new cadres of officers or troops. In November 1926, he was appointed commander of Infantry Regiment No. 2, with a seat in Villa Hayes.

Franco was next assigned to the Paraguayan Chaco. In 1928, acting without orders, Major Franco led an attack that seized and destroyed a Bolivian fort in the Chaco that had been constructed inside Paraguayan territory. Franco was later removed from his command for this action. In August 1928, Franco was appointed commander of the Military Aviation School.

Promoted to colonel in 1933, Franco commanded the first division of the Paraguayan Third Corps in the Chaco War. Franco soon developed a tactic of using long-range patrols to explore weaknesses in the enemy lines. After finding gaps in the Bolivian defenses at Alihuatá, Franco launched a surprise attack on July 12, 1933, that quickly penetrated enemy defenses, forcing the Bolivian 4th Division into headlong retreat.

Franco later became the director of Paraguay's Military School At the end of the war, Franco participated in the Victory Parade as commander of the Second Corps, where the Asunción crowd received him in the streets with acclamation. In 1933, he was promoted to the rank of colonel; on his initiative, Fort Mariscal López and Fort Falcón were built. Later, he took the leadership of Infantry Regiment No. 5 under General Diaz, with its seat in Bahía Negra. He suffered a leg injury, which left him with a limp, due to an accident in his last years at the Military College, when he fell from a horse in the basement of the Cabildo. His troops called him by the affectionate nickname of "Leon Karê," Guaraní for "lame lion."

== Political career ==
Franco was a founder and historic leader of Revolutionary Febrerista Party, a full member of the Socialist International. He took command of the Second Corps, and played an important part in defining the Army campaign during the Chaco war, during fighting at Picuiba and Yrendagué and his Corps took Carandayty, Charagua and Ingavi.

== Presidency ==
Franco was critical of President Eusebio Ayala during the aftermath of the Chaco War. When Ayala exiled Franco to Argentina, Franco's sympathizers toppled Ayala's government, and Colonel Franco returned to Paraguay as interim president. He would serve from February 20, 1936, to August 13, 1937.

=== Social policy ===
The Franco government introduced a number of labor reforms. His government set the work day at 8 hours per day, made Sunday a mandatory day off, introduced the requirement that wage earners receive holidays, and limited the work week to 48 hours (35 hours for unhealthful workplaces). Wages were required to be paid in cash, rather than in vouchers or 'white money'. Other measures recognized workers' right to unionize and strike, as well as the rights of women workers. The government carried out Paraguay's first agrarian reform (5 May 1936), distributing over 200,000 ha of land to 10,000 peasant families, and introduced a one-year freeze on the prices of rents and leases.

Certain measures increased the state's involvement in the economy. On 24 February 1936, the government created the Central Bank of the Republic of Paraguay, which took over the role of the Stock Exchange and also became the sole conduit for foreign trade. Rafael Franco proposed that the state should be involved in any oil exploration. His government also set a base price for certain key commodities such as cotton. In addition, the state merchant fleet was reorganized.

The Franco government provided access to Paraguay's first Japanese settlers, and also facilitated the return of Paraguayan prisoners of war from Bolivia.

=== Military policy ===
Franco undertook to restructure and modernize Paraguay's armed forces and sell weapons that had become worn-out or obsolete.

His government sought to acquire 60 Italian military aircraft in readiness for any threats from Paraguay's neighbours (including Bolivia) and in light of the serious developments then transpiring in Europe. Orders for these aircraft were later rejected by the liberal government that succeeded Rafael Franco's. As a result, only a small number of aircraft arrived. The original contract included:

- 20 Fiat CR.32 (only 5 were purchased)
- 4 Fiat CR.30B (only 2 were purchased)
- 4 Breda Ba.25 (only 3 were purchased)
- 3 Breda Ba.25-Idro for the Naval Aviation (only 1 was purchased)
- 21 Caproni AP.1 (only 7 were purchased)
- 5 Caproni AP.1-Idro for the Naval Aviation (none were purchased)
- 3 Caproni Ca.309 (only 2 were purchased)

In addition, the government provided pensions to veterans and the war wounded, and delivered decorations and salaries to the regular army.

Franco maintained an adamant stance of not ceding any territory conquered by the Paraguayan army in the Chaco War.

=== Changes to national symbolism ===
Franco claimed the ideals of the Revolution Communards and the Independence Revolution.

Franco's government halted construction of the Oratory of Our Lady of the Assumption and re-established it as the National Pantheon of Heroes. The government rehabilitated the 19th-century dictator Francisco Solano López, overturning the decrees that had declared him an outlaw and declaring him instead an unexampled National Hero. An expedition was sent to recover López' remains from his unmarked grave in Cerro Corá, which were reinterred in the new Pantheon. The government also declared Adolfo Rojas Silva a National Hero; he was the first officer to fall in the Chaco War.

March 1 (Heroes' Day) was established as a public holiday.

=== Reorganization of state institutions ===
The Franco government repealed the 1870 Constitution and parliament, and called for a National Constituent Assembly to draft a new and updated Great Charter.

The Franco government created two new ministries for Public Health and Agriculture, respectively. It also oversaw the creation of several other new agencies and bodies, including the National Association of the Indigenous, the National Labour Department, the national labour union federation (CNT), the National Women's Union, the Development and Labour Commission, the Civilian Mobilization Committee, the National Association of Ex-Combatants (UPV current Chaco) of which Franco was appointed as the first president, and the National Revolutionary Union.

The government issued a new series of banknotes of 5, 10, 50, 100, 500 and 1000 heavy weights, and established a philatelic Section within the Directorate General of Post and Telegraph.

Improvements to the country's infrastructure included the first civilian airport, work on ports, and the foundation of several hospitals in the country's interior.

Rafael Franco created two political formations to support his agenda, the Liga Nacional Independiente (Independent National League) and the Unión Nacional Revolucionaria (Revolutionary National Union). Conversely, the right-wing Liberal Party was forced underground.

=== Education policy ===
The Franco government abolished entrance exams for National Schools and repealed fees on primary- and secondary-school studies. It also established a School of Dentistry, Faculties of Economics and of Agricultural Sciences, and the School of Arts and Trades. It opened hundreds of schools and colleges, including rural schools and opportunities for adult education.

=== Cabinet ===
- Foreign Minister: Dr. Juan Stefanich
- Minister of the Interior: Dr. Freire Gomez Esteves and Germán Soler
- Minister of War and Navy: Juan Stefanich and Col. Arístides Rivas Ortellado
- Minister of Finance: Dr. Luis Freire Esteves, Alfredo J. Jacquet, Emilio Gardel
- Minister of Justice, Worship and Public Instruction: Anselmo Jover Peralta, Emilio Gardel, Crescencio Lezcano, Dr. Damian Bruyn
- Minister of Agriculture: Dr. Bernardino Caballero (grandson of Gen. Bernardino Caballero), Guillermo Tell Bertoni
- Minister of Public Health: Dr. Pedro Duarte Ortellado
- Mayor of the City of Asunción: Dr. Felipe Molas López (February 2 to October 1936), Dr. Damian Bruyn (October 1936 to June 1937)

== Overthrow and exile ==
In response to Franco's withdrawing Paraguayan troops from their advanced positions in the Chaco, right-wing sympathizers in the army staged a coup on 13 August 1937 which resulted in Franco's overthrow and led the Liberal Félix Paiva to assume the presidency. Franco fled to Uruguay. He would spend more than 20 years outside the country, only returning briefly to Paraguay in 1946 under an amnesty before fleeing again amidst accusations of conspiracy. From Uruguay, Franco supported a 1947 uprising against Morínigo but denied involvement in a 1956 plot against Alfredo Stroessner.

== Later life ==
When he returned to Paraguay, he performed various jobs to survive. At one point, he was a real-estate broker. He continued his moderate opposition to Alfredo Stroessner's government through the Revolutionary Febrerista Party, which was legalized in 1964.

His health had been deteriorating in his late 70s. In the last years of his life, he lived in a small room that was originally a garage located in the streets of Herrera. From there, he sometimes walked to a cafe that was located on the Avenue. There he met with old friends and comrades with whom he talked of politics and on military and social issues.

In September 1973, Franco entered the Hospital Americano because of his serious condition and did not come out alive. He was visited by Colonel Arturo Bray, with whom he maintained an enmity over 30 years. Colonel Rafael Franco died on September 16, 1973. One of the largest flower wreaths were sent by Arturo Bray. The inscription read: "To a great patriot."

== Bibliography ==
- Franco, Rafael (2012). Decretos y obras del gobierno febrerista: 17-II-1936-13-VIII-1937: La revolución paraguaya (in Spanish). Asunción, Paraguay: Intercontinental Editora. p. 316. ISBN 9789996725364. OCLC 825842525.
- González, E. (2014). Rafael Franco, el revolucionario (in Spanish) (1st ed.). Asunción, Paraguay: El Lector. p. 104. ISBN 978-99953-1-472-9.
- Arrúa Ávalos, Vicente (2020). Rafael Franco: De la guerra a la revolución (in Spanish). Asunción, Paraguay: Editorial Atlas. p. 120. ISBN 978-99967-18-89-2.
- Warren, Harris Gaylord (1950). "Political Aspects of the Paraguayan Revolution, 1936–1940". Hispanic American Historical Review. 30 (1): 2–25. doi:10.2307/2508996. JSTOR 2508996.
- Lewis, Paul H. (1968). The Politics of Exile: Paraguay's Febrerista Party. University of North Carolina Press. ISBN 9780807862964.
- Marcet, José Carlos (1974). Datos para una reseña cronológica sobre los antecedentes, desarrollo y resultado de la Guerra del Chaco (in Spanish). Asunción, Paraguay.
- Amaral, Raúl (1994). Los presidentes del Paraguay (1844–1954): Crónica política (in Spanish). Asunción: Centro Paraguayo de Estudios Sociológicos.
- Farcau, Bruce W. (1996). The Chaco War: Bolivia and Paraguay, 1932–1935. Westport, Connecticut: Praeger. p. 254. ISBN 9780275952181.

Political offices
Preceded by Eusebio Ayala	President of Paraguay; 1936-1937	Succeeded by Félix Paiva
