= Golden Four (Paraguay) =

The term Cuatrinomio de Oro (Spanish for Golden Four, referring to the four sides of a square) refers to a group of influential Paraguayan politicians of the 1960-1980s, representing the closest allies of the dictatorial President Alfredo Stroessner. The group included three members of the government and the presidential secretary. Under the leadership of Stroessner, members of the "Golden Four" stood at the highest levels of the regime, determining the policy of the state and the Colorado Party. They became infamous in the country due to their involvement in political repression and corruption. After the fall of the regime, they were prosecuted.

== Composition and function ==
Following the 1954 coup d'état, major general Alfredo Stroessner was elected President and was soon able to place his supporters in positions of power in the provisional government and in the Colorado Party, culminating in Stroessner securing power for himself. He ruled for 33 years, the longest dictatorship in the history of Paraguay and one of the longest ever in Latin America. The regime was characterized by severe human rights abuses, implacable anti-communism, harsh political repression and large-scale economic projects. The repression continued even after other parties besides Stroessner's Colorados were legalized in 1962.

Stroessner's dictatorship gained most of its support from the military-police command, the state bureaucracy, the Colorado Party apparatus and various paramilitary organizations associated with the party. Support also came from the conservative peasantry, the urban middle class and representatives of organized crime.

Under Minister of the Interior Edgar Ynsfrán, the Paraguayan government waged a ruthless campaign against leftist rebels in the country, and became an ally of the United States during the Cold War due to the regime's fervent anti-communism. Ynsfrán provided the ideological backdrop for the regime during its early period, but was eventually replaced in 1966 as Stroessner sought to clean up the country's image internationally and promote liberalization, although in practice such reforms only existed on paper and not in practice. The regime's draconian repressive measures continued under Ynsfrán's successor, albeit reduced in tempo. At this point, the four people closest to the President became recognized as the Golden Four, and they were:

- Sabino Augusto Montanaro: Minister of the Interior (replacing Ynsfrán), and Vice President of the Colorado Party. The system of the Ministry of Internal Affairs included the civilian and military police, as well as the party militias associated with the Colorado Party.
- Adán Godoy Jiménez: Minister of Health. He oversaw the social policies of Stronism.
- José Eugenio Jacquet: Minister of Justice and Labor. Managed the administrative apparatus and the judiciary. He organized anti-Communist Action Groups (GAA) – in a similar manner as the Argentine Anticommunist Alliance.
- Mario Abdo Benítez Sr.: the President's personal secretary. Managed Stroessner's office and office work.

The leading position in power was determined not so much by state positions as by personal proximity to Stroessner. This group received the name Cuatrinomio de Oro – "Golden Four" or "Fierce Four". Despite their membership of the Colorado Party, their allegiance laid first and foremost with Stroessner himself. Stroessner was prone to making decisions single-handedly. He himself delved into all significant issues and did not need "grey eminences" behind his decisions. However, the members of the "Golden Four" were the main conductors of Stroessner's policy and had a noticeable influence for the dictator.

Montanaro was accused of excessive cruelty; the DIPC and DNAT intelligence services, the Macheteros and Garroteros militias spread fear and destruction in Paraguay for many years. Godoy was notorious for his participation in corruption, and became involved in embezzlement trials after the regime fell. Jacquet was perceived as an ideological fanatic, and many were repelled by his scowling image and the GAA's criminal methods. Abdo Benítez was the subject of jokes in Paraguay and had a reputation for being poorly educated and unfit for the job, but he nonetheless managed to remain in Stroessner's favor for the duration of his tenure.

“A terrifying Minister of the Interior, a boring Minister of Health, an inscrutable but no less dangerous Minister of Justice, and an unqualified personal secretary" – such an account is given by modern historians. In this capacity they were helping Alfredo Stroessner to rule Paraguay.

Individually and ideologically, the members of the Golden Four were not as indispensable as figures such as Edgar Ynsfrán or Juan Manuel Frutos Fleitas had been, but for most Paraguayans these ministers came to symbolize the structure of power within the regime, as well as its excesses, both in terms of violence and corruption. Because of this, they would become prime targets for prosecution during Paraguay's transition to democracy.

== Downfall ==
In the second half of the 1980s, opposition sentiment began spreading within the Colorado party, as the deteriorating economic conditions and constant suppression of civil liberties had become intolerable for many. This opposition movement grew in strength until the coup d'état of 2 and 3 February 1989, when Stroessner was deposed and replaced by his former confidant, Andrés Rodríguez Pedotti, with the support of the army. Alfredo Stroessner was expelled from Paraguay to Brazil. Godoy, Jacquet, Abdo Benítez were arrested, while Montanaro managed to escape to Honduras. Severity towards the members of the "Golden Four" was supposed to demonstrate the seriousness of the reformist intentions of the new regime.

Godoy, Jacquet and Abdo Benítez were put on trial. Godoy was accused of financial manipulation with the fictitious construction of hospitals, Jacquet of embezzlement of budget funds, Abdo Benítez – of appropriation of land during the agrarian reform. All three were found guilty and sentenced to prison. Godoy served a few months, Abdo Benítez three years, and Jacquet five years. After his release, Godoy, who suffered a stroke, and Abdo Benítez, who suffered from Parkinson's disease, led a secluded life. Jacquet remained active, practicing law, but retired from politics. The public was indignant that only corruption charges were brought against them, and not crimes against humanity.

Montanaro returned to Paraguay in 2009 after twenty years in exile. He was arrested, placed in prison, and then under house arrest. He was accused of abuse of power, illegal arrests, torture and murder. The trial against him began, but did not reach the verdict.

Sabino Montanaro died in 2011, Mario Abdo Benitez in 2013, and Adan Godoy in 2017. Montanaro and Abdo Benitez died in Asunción, Paraguay, whereas Godoy in São Paulo, Brazil. None of them expressed remorse about their previous activities.

In 2018, right-wing candidate Mario Abdo Benítez, the son of Abdo Benítez Sr., was elected president of Paraguay. The inauguration ceremony was attended by Eugenio Jacquet, the last member of the "Golden Four". In a controversial interview released afterwards, Jacquet stated that while difficult decisions had to be taken in the Stroessner period, it had all been done for the common good, with the fruits of that work visible today. He also stated that those who were killed by the dictatorship were not tortured or murdered, but were "rebels killed in battle".
