= Raimundo Rolón =

President of Paraguay in 1949

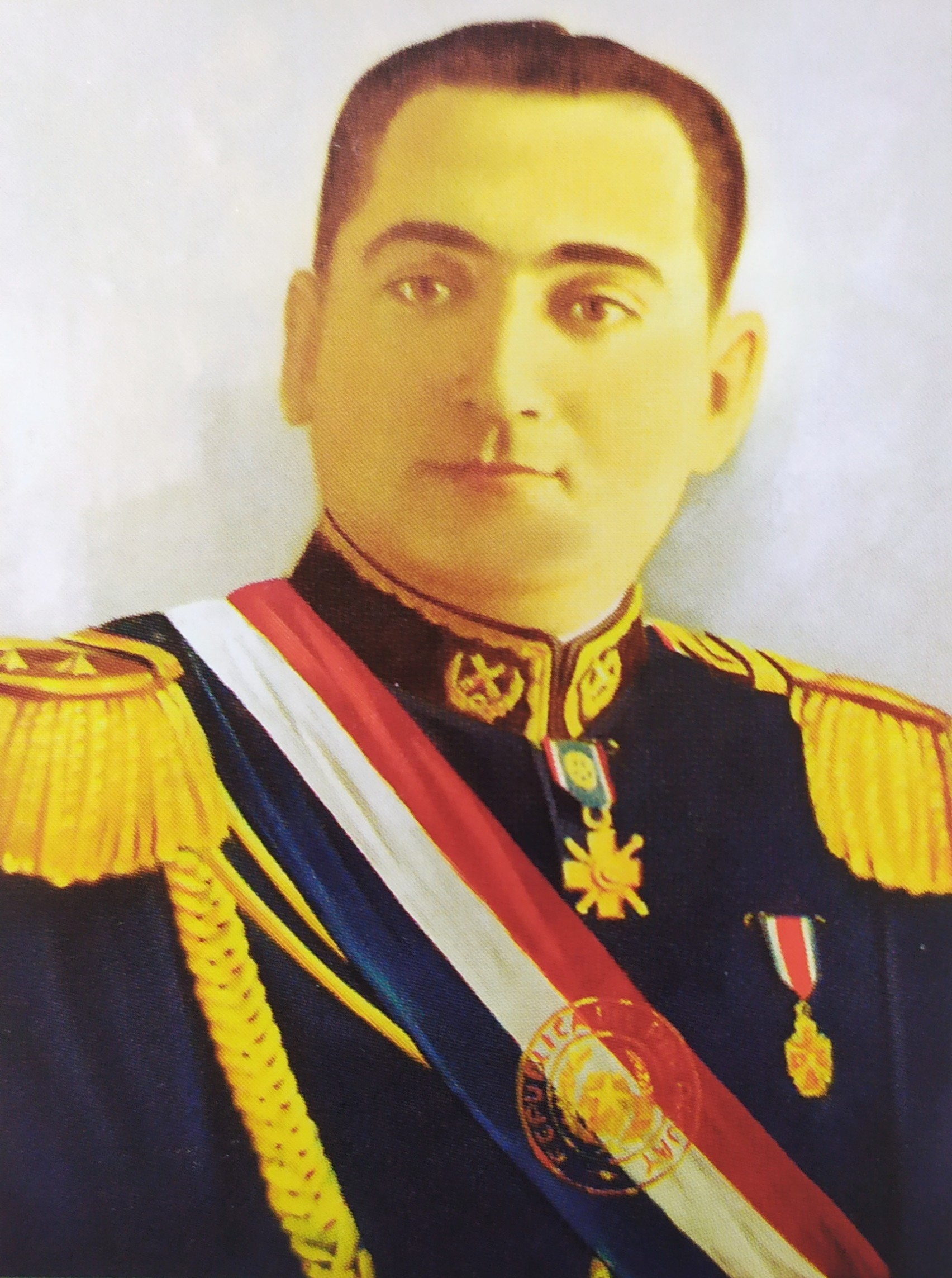

38th President of Paraguay
- In office January 30, 1949 – February 27, 1949
- Preceded by: Juan Natalicio González
- Succeeded by: Felipe Molas López

Personal details
- Born: Raimundo Rolón Villasanti; March 14, 1903 Paraguarí, Paraguay
- Died: November 17, 1981 (aged 78) Asunción, Paraguay
- Party: Colorado Party

Brigadier General Raimundo Rolón Villasanti (Paraguarí, March 14, 1903 – Asunción, November 17, 1981) was briefly President of Paraguay from January 30, 1949, to February 27, 1949.

He served as Defense Minister under Natalicio Gonzalez until he led a coup against him in January 1949.

Political offices
Preceded by Natalicio González	President of Paraguay; 1949	Succeeded by Felipe Molas
