= PCP(M-L) =

PCP(M-L) may refer to:

- Communist Party of Portugal (Marxist–Leninist)
- Communist Party of Portugal (Marxist–Leninist) (1974)
- Paraguayan Communist Party (Marxist–Leninist)
