= Juan Stefanich =

Paraguayan politician

Juan Stefanich Troche (1889–1979) was a Paraguayan politician and public intellectual who served as Minister of Foreign Affairs under the Rafael Franco administration. In 1925, he along with colleagues began publication of La Nacion. In 1928, a group led by Stefanich created Liga Nacional Independiente, which argued for a revitalized Paraguayan democracy ("democracia solidarista").

He represented Paraguay in international organizations, including on the Secretariat of the League of Nations. He authored several books.

He helped to organize the 1936 February Revolution, which ousted President Eusebio Ayala and brought to power colonel Rafael Franco. He was Minister of Foreign Affairs under Franco from 1936 to Franco's ouster in 1937.

He went into exile in Buenos Aires.
