= Felipe Molas López =

President of Paraguay in 1949

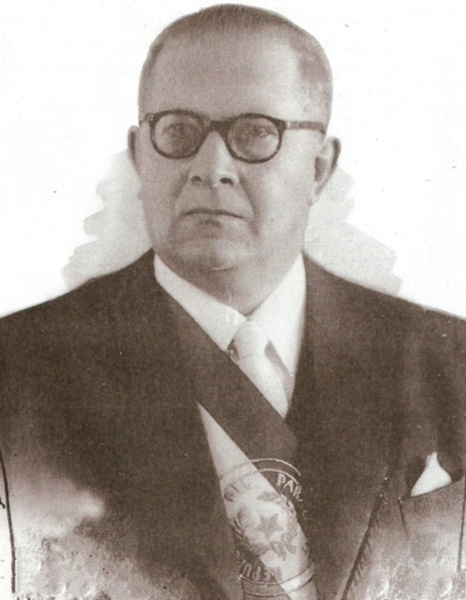
- Molas Lopez in 1949

39th President of Paraguay
- In office February 27, 1949 – September 10, 1949
- Preceded by: Raimundo Rolón
- Succeeded by: Federico Chávez

Personal details
- Born: July 10, 1901 Paraguay
- Died: November 17, 1954 (aged 53) Asunción, Paraguay
- Party: Colorado Party
- Spouse: Eligia Mora

Felipe Benigno Molas López (July 10, 1901 – November 17, 1954) was the 39th President of Paraguay from February 27, 1949 to September 10, 1949, when he resigned.

== Life ==
=== Early life ===
Born in 1901 in Yuty, Caazapá Department. Once he completed high school, he pursued Dentistry in Paris. He obtained in Bordeaux a specialization in implant, all new to medical science of the early twentieth century, becoming one of the firsts Paraguayans to get a degree in that field.

=== Chaco War ===
He served in the war with Bolivia where he reached the rank of captain of Health. In the postwar, he took active participation in drawing up plans for the installation of the Faculty of Dentistry at the National University which was located in the previous residence of former president José P. Guggiari. He practiced a successful career but was stopped by attracting the magnetism of politics, which Paraguayans from all scales feel so much affection for.

He became a member of the Colorado Party in his early twenties. The party, then in the opposition, split in 1927, facing a proposal of the Liberal government, headed by president Eligio Ayala. Ayala wanted the Colorados to participate in the drafting of a new electoral law. It was his intention to make sure that both parties should participate in the upcoming election for congress. This caused a split in the Colorado Party amongst the "eleccionistas" (electionists), who accepted the offer, and the "abstencionistas" (abstentionists), who wanted a stronger and radical opposition against the government. Molas joined to the last group and became a close aide to their leader, former president Pedro Peña.

=== Civil Service ===
On February 21, 1936, he assumed as the mayor of Asunción for a short period. His brilliant talents of scientific and public man became the leading figure in the national political scene, far complex and anarchic. In 1948 he participated in the ministry of Education in the fleeting mandate of the president Juan Manuel Frutos and then in the mandate of Juan Natalicio González. With the assumption of the chairmanship of General Raimundo Rolón, Molas López retained his ministry until January 30, 1949. As the country was subjected to a one-party regime, February 15 of the same year, by the decision of the Board of Colorado Party, gathered in Convention he got the possibility for the implementation of the Statute of Party and the appointment of Dr. Felipe Molas López as a candidate for president. This measure was achieved through an agreement among the “chavistas” groups and democratic groups. The Convention provided the fullest and most loyal adherence to the candidature of the Coreligionist Dr. Felipe Molas López, to be sustained for the elections called for April 17.

=== Presidency ===
On February 27, 1949, he assumed the provisory presidency until May 14 – with the general election done – he took possession of official duties. The political agreement was not a greater guaranteed for the ruler, who was deposed six months later, on September 11. A few days later, the Board acknowledged the causes for the President's overthrow. He was accused of having failed to fulfill the targets set as the unification of the party, the progressive restoration of republican institutions, also of public morality. As it was assumed, the president had to overcome a series of political and military upheavals, over the constant pressure of the leaders of his party because, as well as the writer Raul Amaral says "the Governing Board had control over the state and those responsible for ruling it.”

=== Death ===
Molas López died in Asunción on November 17, 1954, aged 53.

From June 19, 1956, by a municipal decree an avenue of Asunción bears his name.

== Administration ==
His cabinet was composed of:

- Liberato Rodriguez (after Mario Mallorquín) Interior
- Federico Chavez (Bernardo Ocampos) Foreign Affairs
- Ramon Mendez Paiva, Finance
- Rigoberto Caballero, Public Works
- Pedro Hugo Pena, Public Health and Social Welfare
- Rigoberto Caballero, Public Works and Communications
- Jose Zacarias Arza, National Defense
- Liberato Rodriguez (Bernardo Ocampos, Fabio Da Silva) Economy
- J. Augusto Saldivar (Fabio Da Silva, Guillermo Enciso Velloso) Justice and Labour
- J. Eulojio Estigarribia, education.

Among the rulings in his government recalls the following:

- Amnesty for exiles from the revolution of 1947. (Measurement according to the view of Raul Amaral, did not produce positive effects.)
- Resumption of relations with Uruguay.
- Name of General Bernardino Caballero to the First Cavalry Division.
- Transfer of the remains of General Caballero to National Pantheon of Heroes.

The unification of the Colorado party had not been brought to a successful conclusion. Very soon appeared other factors that deepen the gaps separating the parties remained in crisis and that the Paraguayan political life.

The Colorado Party returned to power in January 1947, following a failed multiparty coalition, and with the support of then-president Gral. Higinio Morínigo.

Political offices
Preceded by Raimundo Rolón	President of Paraguay; 1949	Succeeded by Federico Chávez
