= Juan Manuel Frutos =

Paraguayan lawyer and politician

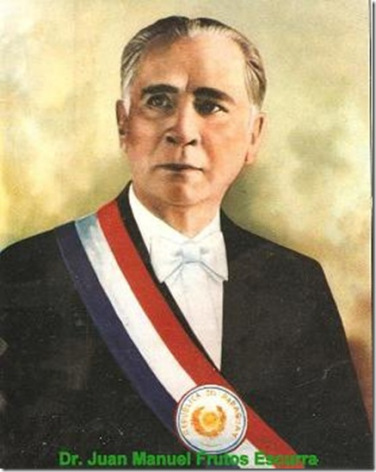

36th President of Paraguay
- In office June 3, 1948 – August 15, 1948
- Preceded by: Higinio Morínigo
- Succeeded by: Juan Natalicio González

Personal details
- Born: June 12, 1879 Asunción, Paraguay
- Died: April 15, 1960 (aged 80) Asunción, Paraguay
- Party: Colorado

Juan Manuel Frutos (June 12, 1879 – April 15, 1960) was a Paraguayan lawyer and politician, who served as the 36th President of Paraguay on a provisional basis, from 3 June to 15 August 1948. As the president of the Supreme Court of Justice, he assumed the role of provisional President of Paraguay after the resignation of Higinio Morínigo.

== Early life and education ==
Frutos was born in Asunción on 12 June 1879. His parents were José Dolores Frutos and Juliana Escurra, sister of former president Colonel Juan Antonio Escurra. In 1895 he was accepted into the National School of the Capital, where his teachers included Manuel Domínguez, Manuel Franco, and Manuel Gondra.

He graduated from high school on 1 March 1901. He went to study Law and Social Sciences in the National University of Asunción in 1903. He graduated with a doctoral degree in 1912; his thesis was on "The prohibition of retaining property". Parallel to his studies he was secretary of the Commission of Public Works, guide teacher in the National School of the Capital, Fiscal Agent in civil matters. The year of this graduation he organized the 7th battalion of the National Guard, of which he later became Commander.

He directed several newspapers and wrote about politics. For a time, he was exiled to Corrientes, Argentina, from where he wrote for ¡Luchad! ('Fight!'). He worked as a journalist for General Caballero, El Sufragio, and El Colegiado, which led him to suffer several repercussions and even being sent to prison in several occasions.

== His government ==
After President Higinio Morínigo's government was overthrown amid fears that he would try to prolong his term in office by force, the Legislative Assembly gathered and appointed Frutos as his successor. He assumed the presidency on 3 June 1948, and held the position until 15 August 1948, when Natalicio González became president. Frutos's government lasted two months and twelve days.

During his government he declared 16 August as the "Day of the Paraguayan Children", as proposed by Professor Andrés Aguirre, Director of Information for the Presidency. On 13 August 1948, the Ministry of Justice and Work was created.

== Personal life ==
Juan Manuel Frutos was married three times, and had sixteen children in total, among them the musician Juan Manuel Frutos Pane and the politician Juan Manuel Frutos Fleitas. He died in Asunción, on April 15, 1960.

Political offices
Preceded by Higinio Moríñigo	President of Paraguay; 1948	Succeeded by Juan Natalicio González
