= Juan Manuel Frutos Fleitas =

Paraguayan politician (1923–2013)

Rural Welfare Institute
- In office 1963–1989

Personal details
- Born: 10 April 1923 Asunción, Paraguay
- Died: 24 March 2013 (aged 89) Asunción, Paraguay
- Party: National Republican Association – Colorado Party
- Nickname: Papacito

Juan Manuel Frutos Fleitas (also known by his alias of Papacito) (April 10, 1923 – March 24, 2013) was a Paraguayan politician and government minister under the dictatorship of Alfredo Stroessner. He was the founder and first chairman of the Rural Welfare Institute (Instituto de Bienestar Rural—IBR), and as such, he was one of the key figures of the Stroessner administration's economic policy, spearheading the "March to the East" land reclamation and colonization project of the 1960s-1980s. Frutos, a staunch anti-communist, also served as an ideologue of the Stroessner regime, and was the chairman of the Paraguayan branch of the World League for Freedom and Democracy anti-communist organization.

== Early life ==
Juan Manuel Frutos Fleitas was born on April 10, 1923. He was the son of former President of Paraguay Juan Manuel Frutos Sr. and his third wife, María Luz Fleytas. He spent his childhood and youth among the peasants of the village of Ybytimí, an agrarian and cattle-breeding of the Paraguarí Department. He received an education as an agricultural manager.

From a young age, Frutos became involved in his father's Colorado Party, During the civil war of 1947, he joined the ultra-right Guión Rojo, the paramilitary wing of the Colorado Party. After the war, Frutos Jr. moved up the ranks of the Colorado party. Ideologically, he was close to the Third Position: he combined the traditional Catholic worldview, extreme nationalism, implacable anti-communism with republican views and social populism. In particular, he emphasized the importance of the influence of right-wing forces on the rural masses and advocated agrarian reform with the allocation of land to the peasants.

Much like his father before him, Juan Manuel Frutos Fleitas was the head of a large family. Because of this bore the nickname Papacito, which turned into a stable pseudonym.

== Government career ==
The 1954 coup d'état saw the rise to power of Alfredo Stroessner, an army general who instituted a one-party state dictatorship in Paraguay for the next 35 years. Frutos supported the new government, and Stroessner invited him to join his administration to oversee the agrarian-peasant policy. Frutos was appointed chairman of a special government body, the National Council for Social Progress (Consejo Nacional de progreso social, CNPS). In 1963, he established the Rural Welfare Institute (Instituto de Bienestar Rural, IBR), a government agricultural agency. The IBR was The IBR, which superseded the Agrarian Reform Institute, was empowered to redistribute landed property.

The core of the agrarian policy of Frutos was the program of "colonization" - the intensive creation of new peasant farms. Land plots were sold for a symbolic price (sometimes a few dollars) or transferred to new owners by force. The cooperation of new owners and the creation of large agricultural companies were encouraged. On the basis of such associations, about a hundred new settlements arose, some of them grew into cities. At the same time, even Frutos' supporters admitted that the reform he was carrying out was accompanied by numerous criminal abuses. However, the result was the creation of about 200 thousand new agricultural entities. From 1963 to the late 1980s, the IBR titled millions of hectares of land and created hundreds of colonies, directly affecting the circumstances of roughly one-quarter of the population. Up to the late 1980s, the IBR remained the key government agency, along with the Ministry of Agriculture and Livestock, in serving the land needs of small farmers.

Frutos' opponents argued that his agrarian reform had a pronounced political bias. Land was allocated primarily to supporters of Stroessner and his regime - Colorado activists, military and police officers, members of pro-Stroessner organizations, criminal organizations tolerated by the regime, and pro-government peasants. In March 2012, under left-wing President Fernando Lugo, a group of human rights activists even approached the Prosecutor General's Office with a proposal to investigate the activities of Frutos when he was head of the IBR. This attempt was stopped after the controversial impeachment of Fernando Lugo.

Juan Manuel Frutos held large political sway under Stroessner. He was the leader of the right-wing radical faction of traditionalists in the ruling Colorado, and acted as one of the main ideologists of the Stronist regime and the organizer of its mass base, particularly following the dismissal of Edgar Ynsfrán. Frutos was mentioned in a CIA report as a possible successor to Stroessner. Characteristically, Frutos headed the Paraguayan branch of the World League for Freedom and Democracy, and chaired the XII WLFD conference in Asunción (April 1979). In his speech at the Asunción conference, Frutos called for a tough forceful confrontation with communism. At the same time, he condemned the communist ideology and politics not only for their "anti-Christian" orientation, but also for social injustice and the hierarchical domination of the nomenklatura over the masses. Frutos called not only to defend traditional values and the Christian understanding of freedom, but also to assert social equality and justice as opposed to communism. He also insisted on the economic equality of "free nations", the rejection of selfish protectionism and assistance to developing countries - so that "social problems would not become overwhelming".

== After Stroessner ==
Over the course of the 1980s, opposition to the Stroessner regime began forming within the Colorado Party, culminating in the coup d'état of 2 and 3 February 1989, when Stroessner was deposed and replaced by his former confidant, Andrés Rodríguez Pedotti, with the support of the army. The new government of Andrés Rodríguez appointed Juan Manuel Frutos as ambassador to Spain. After returning to Paraguay, he continued to be active in the Colorado Party. Until the end of his life, Frutos was an authoritative adviser to Colorado Chairman Senator Lilian Samaniego. He also worked as a consultant for entrepreneurs. Readjusting to the societal changes that had occurred in Paraguay after Stroessner's fall, commentators sarcastically noted that "a fanatical follower of Stroessner has turned into a friend of the liberals". But at its core, Frutos' worldview remained the same, and despite his participation in the dictatorship, unlike some other ministers, he was never charged with a crime.

Juan Manuel Frutos died on March 24, 2013, at the age of 90. Horacio Cartes, who became President of Paraguay three months later, as well as several other politicians, expressed their condolence and honored his memory and service to the party.
