= February Revolution (Paraguay) =

1936 coup d'état that brought to power colonel Rafael Franco

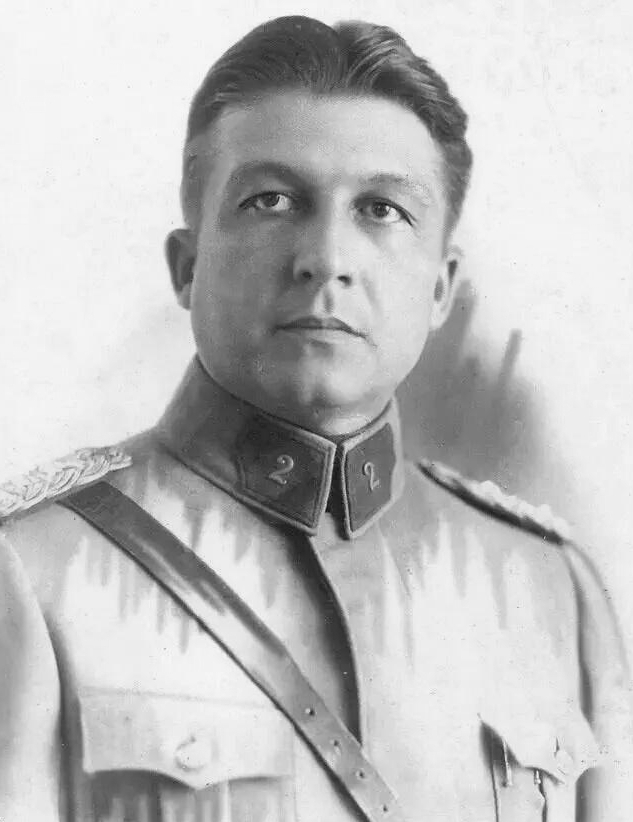
Rafael Franco, leader of the revolution

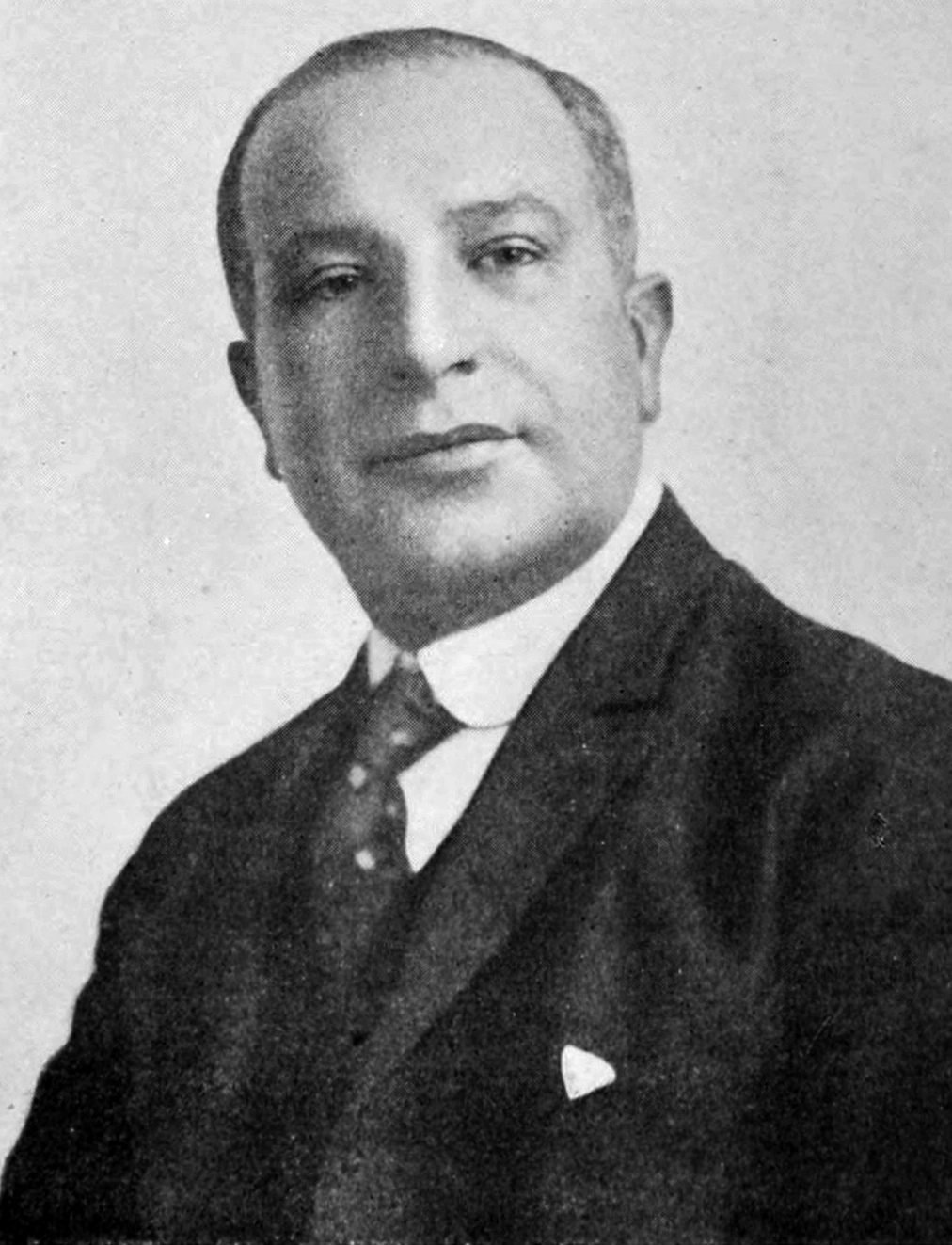
President Eusebio Ayala, deposed in the revolution

The February Revolution in Paraguay was a military coup d'état on February 17, 1936, that ousted President Eusebio Ayala and brought to power colonel Rafael Franco. The revolution marked the end of Liberal Party rule in Paraguay and started the ascendancy of military dictatorships that lasted for more than half a century.

Franco's government had three lasting impacts; it played a key role in shaping Paraguayan nationalism, implemented Paraguay's first major land reform (the confiscation, and breaking up, of some large private land holdings), and officially recognized labor rights.

Franco was overthrown on August 13, 1937, but his influence and that of febreristas continued to influence Paraguayan politics and eventually led to the Paraguayan Civil War in 1947 and establishment of the Revolutionary Febrerista Party in 1951.

The revolution has been described as a "joint Marxist and fascist coup" which "laid the groundwork for the pro-Nazi dictatorship of Higinio Morínigo in 1940".

== Background ==
The main idea behind the Revolution can be summoned with a fragment from a play by Julio Correa about the war: "After this war...we will embrace the tricolor, in this war we have demonstrated who we are..., that we are strong in the face of wrong, that we have strength and heart. We are going to expel all the Bolivians and later we will expel all of the traitors and thieves. Our country is ours..., we won it with sweat, tears and blood. All the Paraguayans after this war will have a piece of land on which to build their homes."

After armistice was signed on June 12, 1935, President Eusebio Ayala quickly dismissed many soldiers from the army and were sent home without pensions, and due to the economic recession they were left unemployed, with many of them staying in Asuncion in search of better opportunities.

By the end of Chaco War, Ayala's Liberal Party was split into various factions and there was no guaranteed successor for Ayala, whose term was coming to an end, and was seen as supporting José Félix Estigarribia, the popular commander of the Paraguayan forces in the Chaco War, ascending to the presidency. However, there was growing suspiction that Ayala would use the powerful position in the military of Estigarribia to amend the constitution to secure another term. Adding to the political tensions of the time, Estigarribia also had opponents within the military, who were disenchanted with his management of the war; in particular, military officers believed that he should have taken Santa Cruz de la Sierra (which borders the Chaco frontier).

Said officers would coalesce in the figure of Colonel Rafael Franco, a populist officer with a history of being a military troublemaker; in 1928, and acting without orders, he had ordered an attack on the Fort Vanguardia from the Bolivians, resulting in international arbitration that ordered Paraguay to rebuild the fort for the Bolivians. As a result, Franco was relieved from his military duties, only to be reinstated following the beginning of the Chaco War. After the war, Franco had been appointed director the Military College by Ayala, with the encouragement of Estigarribia, in hopes to quell the more radical voices in the military. However, Franco would use his appointment at the military school as a "pulpit" to criticize both Estigarribia and Ayala. On February 6, 1936, Ayala removed Franco from his position and was exiled to Buenos Aires for plotting against the government. This rallied his supporters to action.

== Coup ==
During the night of February 16, troops led by lieutenant colonels Federico Wenman Smith and Camildo Recalde occupied Asunción. Police headquarters were attacked with a loss of about 50 lives. Battles in the city lasted the whole day and in the evening President Ayala surrendered to Recalde. Estigarribia flew to Asuncion from his headquarters in Chaco, but was arrested in the airport. Franco returned from his exile in Buenos Aires on February 19 and was sworn in as provisional president the next day. Six months later, the jailed Ayala and Estigarribia were deported to Montevideo, Uruguay.

Juan Stefanich was one of the main organizers behind the revolution.

== Main achievements ==
Franco promised that his government would institute sweeping changes favouring the popular classes, ignored for so long by the Liberal governments. Paraguay, Franco insisted, was a 'natural democracy' in the sense that all segments of society had a strong feeling of national solidarity. New laws and institutions were intended to reflect this unity; however, these were never properly put into effect and tested since the government of the February Revolution was overthrown by a Liberal counter-revolution within eighteen months. Moreover, during its brief existence, the revolutionary government was riven by factions whose quarrelling prevented it from following any well-defined course.

Nevertheless, the febreristas — as the revolutionaries later came to call themselves — would claim the revolutionary government to have broken with the past in at least three important areas:

- It replaced the formerly dominant liberal ideas with what Leslie Bethell called "a cult of nationalism, to which all subsequent governments had to play at least lip service." This new nationalism revolved around the symbol of Mariscal Francisco Solano López, president and commander-in-chief during the Paraguayan War (1864–1870). During the Liberal era, he was branded in all school textbooks as a brutal despot whose megalomania had brought the country to disaster. Even further, the Liberals argued that his unchecked power was the inevitable result of his regime's state socialism, to which individualism and free enterprise were the proper antidotes. Franco proclaimed López a patriot, and commissioned a search to find his unmarked grave. His remains were exhumed and carried back to Asunción where, alongside the body of his father, Carlos Antonio López, and mementoes of José Gaspar Rodríguez de Francia, Paraguay's first ruler, were deposited in a reconverted chapel that was christened the National Pantheon of the Heroes. According to Bethell, this meant that "popular nationalism now had its shrine".
- It launched the first serious land reform. In May 1936 the Agrarian Reform Law was passed, which ordered nationalization of two million hectares (five million acres) of land, with indemnification for the owners, and the creation of small and medium-sized farms of between 25 and 250 acres. By the time Franco fell in August 1937, nearly 200,000 hectares (500,000 acres) had been distributed to 10,000 families. Franco's successors drastically slowed down the pace of land reform. Although some land from public lands was given to peasants from time to time, no further attempt was made to tackle the latifundio problem.
- It gave official recognition to labour rights. Bethell described Franco's attitudes towards the small but growing labour movement as having "reflected a mixture of sympathy, suspicion and paternalism." In June 1936 the Ministry of Labour was created and the first ever Labour Code was adopted, many of the reforms workers had long demanded were conceded (an eight-hour working day, annual paid vacations, a weekly rest day, and the right to form and join unions), and the Confederación Paraguaya de Trabajadores (CPT, "Paraguayan Confederation of Workers") was established. These gains had their price, however, in the form of more official control: concerned about Communist influence, which had been growing in the unions since 1928, the febreristas required all labour organizations to obtain legal recognition from the Ministry of Labour, with failure to do so meant that a union could not hold meetings, own property, sign labour contracts, collect dues, or go to court to represent its members before management or the government. If a legal union challenged the government's policies, it could be 'intervened', meaning that it might lose its legal status, have its assets frozen or suffer the replacement of its officers by government intervenors. As a result, Bethell labeled the revolutionary government's labour reforms as "double-edged", arguing that the unions could blossom under a benign regime like Franco's, but their dependence on the government left them impotent under Franco's conservative successors.

Another result of the Revolution was beginning of the official use of the native Guarani language. Guarani was widely spoken among the soldiers and was used per order of José Félix Estigarribia in Paraguayan military communications during the Chaco War in order to make them harder for Bolivians to decode.

== Collapse ==
Franco's government defined itself as being opposed to the previous Liberal era, but it lacked a unified vision for what it stood for and what it wanted to achieve.

To pacify the revolutionary strikes, land seizures and unrest in army, on March 10, 1936, Franco issued Decree 152 by which he forbade all political parties and proclaimed that February revolution will follow the totalitarian regimes of Europe. This March 10, 1936 law was drafted by the Minister of Interior Gomes Freire Esteves, who was a fascist sympathizer and in 1915 had led a revolt against President Eduardo Schaerer. The law proposed to establish a corporativist state. This alienated many of Franco's supporters. The uproar among Franco's political supporters was so great that he was forced to null this decree. The political ineptitude of Franco led to the withdrawal of the Colorado Party from his government.

Meanwhile, the Chaco Peace Conference was continuing and in January 1937 Franco agreed to give in to some Bolivian territorial demands. This caused dissatisfaction in the army and the commander of troops in Chaco, colonel Ramon Paredes who was a Liberal supporter. On August 13, 1937, his soldiers occupied Asuncion and overthrew Franco. Two years later Liberal politicians succeeded in electing Estigarribia to the Presidency of Republic.
