= Juan Natalicio González =

Paraguayan politician (1897–1966)

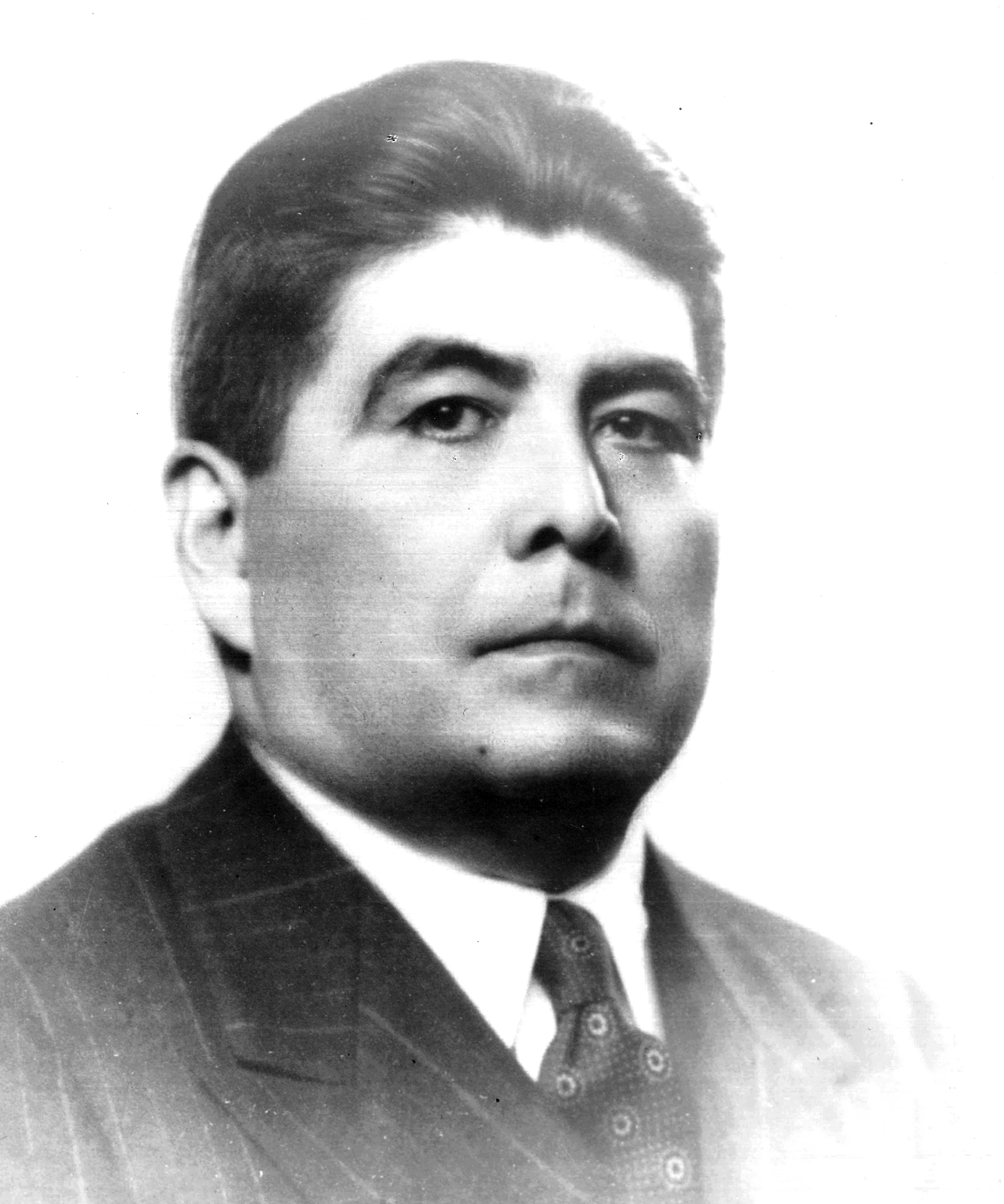
- González in 1948

37th President of Paraguay
- In office August 16, 1948 – January 30, 1949
- Preceded by: Juan Manuel Frutos
- Succeeded by: Raimundo Rolón

Personal details
- Born: Juan Natalicio González Paredes; September 8, 1897 Villarrica, Paraguay
- Died: December 6, 1966 (aged 69) Mexico City, Mexico
- Party: Colorado Party (Guión Rojo)
- Spouse: Lydia Frutos

Juan Natalicio González Paredes (8 September 1897 – 6 December 1966) was a Paraguayan politician and poet who served as President of Paraguay from 15 August 1948 to 30 January 1949.

== Early life ==
Natalicio González was born in Villarrica in the department of Guairá. Having lost his parents, he moved to Asunción, Paraguay's capital, in 1912 to finish his high school studies. He graduated in 1915 from the Colegio Nacional de Asunción (Asunción's National College), and planned to study medicine in the Universidad Nacional de Asunción (Asunción's National University). However, that same year the government shut down the UNA's medical school. Meanwhile, Natalicio started developing a career as journalist and writer, and became affiliated with the Colorado Party. He had no further formal education, but he achieved an outstanding intellectual level through a very disciplined self-education.

In 1928 he married Lydia Frutos, a well-known Paraguayan socialite. Lydia was famous for her beauty and also for her high intellectual level, having graduated from educational institutions abroad.

== Politician and writer ==
Natalicio was associated with some of the intellectuals of the Colorado Party. His links with people like Juan O'Leary, Fulgencio Moreno and Antolín Irala—among others—made possible for him to achieve prominence in the party's organization and propaganda machinery. Very soon he became the main writer for some newspapers linked to the Colorado Party, like Patria, Colorado, and El País. During this time he published some books of poetry, political commentary, and historical essays.

In 1920 he moved to Buenos Aires, Argentina, where he worked for a major publishing company. His duties allowed him to travel all over South America and meet politicians, writers, and intellectuals from different South American countries.

In 1923 he moved to Paris, to work with a Paraguayan publishing company. He spent two years in Europe, returning to Paraguay at the end of 1924.

After he returned to Asunción, he became more active in the Colorado Party. He reached higher positions in the Party's organization and, by 1926, he was one of the leading party members who negotiatiated for a new electoral law with the ruling Liberals.

Unfortunately for the Colorados, the negotiations with the Liberal government became a source of division within the Colorado Party. The abstencionistas were reluctant to negotiate anything with the government; they supported abstention from voting to channel popular discontent against the government and bring about a non-violent revolution. The eleccionistas responded positively to the government's calls for a political ceasefire. Natalicio was one of the main and most dynamic leader of the eleccionistas.

Finally, by 1927, the new electoral law passed and was applied for the first time in the legislative elections held in the beginning of that year. The eleccionista Colorado Party won some seats in the Chamber of Deputies and the Senate, forming a minority bloc. The Colorado senators were mostly former ministers and intellectual leaders during past Colorado governments, while the Deputies included new younger figures, mostly teachers and journalists, who were developing new political idea. Natalicio was the leader of this group, and acted as minority leader during his tenure as national deputy, which had begun in 1926.

However, by 1929, Natalicio was not satisfied with the way Paraguayan politics were going. He did not expect the Colorados to get anything at all from participating in electoral politics and the legislature while the Liberals were in power.

In 1929 Natalicio asked the Chamber of Deputies for permission to leave his post and travel to Europe with his wife. He would return to Paraguay only in 1945, and in the same year would be Paraguayan ambassador to Uruguay.

He was Minister of Finance of Paraguay from 1946 to 1948.

== Presidency ==
The civil war of 1947 saw the Colorado Party and President Higinio Morínigo fight a rebellion by members of the Liberal Party, Revolutionary Febrerista Party and Communist Party. Significant portions of the army rebelled against the government, but Morínigo was able to maintain power with the help of the Guión Rojo, a paramilitary force of the Colorado Party that Natalicio had himself created in the early 40s and which proved crucial in helping the party maintain control of the state during this period.

Natalicio was elected president on 14 February 1948; he was nominated by the Colorados, and was the only candidate. Incumbent President Higinio Morínigo, who had been a de facto dictator, threatened a coup d´état to retain power. and was himself deposed by a coup on 3 June. Juan Manuel Frutos became interim president until Natalicio took office on 15 August.

One of the most important acts of his administration was the nationalization of the American Light and Traction Company (CALT), which later became the Ande. One of his famous phrases was: "There will be no red poor"; this led him to give important and politically powerful positions to representatives of all sections of the Colorado Party.

From the start of his term, there were rumors that he would not finish his term of office. On 26 October 1948 dissident Colorados attempted a coup d'état against him. The rebellion was blocked by loyalist forces, but Natalicio could not hold out for long. On 29 January 1949 another coup broke out, initiated by Felipe Molas López, Federico Chaves, and defense minister General Raimundo Rolón, who controlled the military forces. Natalicio resigned in the early morning of 30 January, and General Rolón took power.

Natalicio González was again driven into exile. On 7 February 1949 he went to Buenos Aires. In 1950 he went to Mexico. He was the last intellectual to hold the presidency of the Republic in the twentieth century.

== Death ==
Natalicio died in Mexico on 6 December 1966, of a heart attack. He had been invited back to Paraguay and was to leave that very day. His wife Lydia committed suicide after finding his body.

Political offices
Preceded by Juan Manuel Frutos	President of Paraguay; 1948–1949	Succeeded by Raimundo Rolón
