= Sabino Augusto Montanaro =

Paraguayan politician (1922–2011)

Minister of the Interior
- In office 1966–1989
- President: Alfredo Stroessner
- Preceded by: Edgar Ynsfrán
- Succeeded by: Orlando Machuca Vargas

Personal details
- Born: 30 July 1922
- Died: 10 September 2011 (aged 89) Asunción, Paraguay

Sabino Augusto Montanaro Ciarleti (30 July 1922 – 10 September 2011) was a Paraguayan politician. He served as Minister of the Interior between 1966 and 1989 in Alfredo Stroessner's government. Montanaro was also the first Vice President of the Partido Colorado.

== Political life ==
Montanaro was an influential figure during the Stronato, often mentioned as one of the four closest politicians to Alfredo Stroessner (the so-called "Cuatrinomio de Oro"), and was blamed for many human rights violations. He was the Minister of the Interior from 1966 until 1989, when Stroessner's dictatorship was overthrown in a coup d'état.

=== Minister of the Interior ===
During his tenure as Minister of the Interior, freedom of the press in Paraguay was severely limited. Several newspapers and radio stations, such as ABC Color and Radio Ñandutí, faced restrictions and bans. In June 1979, Montanaro ordered the closure of the newspapers Ultima Hora and La Tribuna for a duration of 30 days.

The Catholic Church had begun distancing itself from the Stroessner regime since the 1960s. In 1969, the police invaded the Parroquia Cristo Rey in Asunción to arrest radical Jesuits and physically abuse elderly clergy. Following the incident, the Archbishop of Asunción, Juan José Aníbal Mena Porta excommunicated Montanaro. However, the church's Conferencia Episcopal Paraguaya avoided vocal criticism of the regime during the 1970s. Montanaro was once again excommunicated in 1971 by archbishop Ismael Rolón.

Montanaro also mobilised the Colorado peasant militia, known as the Macheteros de Santani, to repress a Partido Liberal Radical Auténtico (PLRA) rally in San Jose in April 1986. In 1987, he and other loyalists of Stroessner took an even stronger grip over the Partido Colorado and the governmental institutions of Paraguay. This caused fierce resistance from other politicians in the party and led to the eventual coup on February 3rd 1989.

=== Political asylum ===
After the coup against Stroessner, Montanaro sought asylum in the Honduran consulate in Asunción. A few days later, he appeared in Tegucigalpa, the capital of Honduras. In Honduras, he was compelled to abandon the Catholic faith and become an evangelical preacher. During his asylum in Honduras, Paraguay demanded his extradition on two occasions. On 1 May 2009 he returned to Paraguay, stirring street protests. Facing an arrest warrant since 1997 and accused of torture-related crimes, protesters demanded he be jailed in Tacumbú prison. Due to his poor health condition, a judge ordered his detention in a hospital. On 24 June 2009 he was jailed in Tacumbú prison. Following a visit from the country's Supreme Court judge, the court ordered his release from prison but kept him under house arrest.

== Death ==
He died in Asunción on 10 September 2011, aged 89, from pulmonary complications.

It later became known that Montanaro's son opened an offshore company through the Panamanian law firm Mossack Fonseca shortly before Montanaro died.
