= Higinio Morínigo =

President of Paraguay from 1940 to 1948

Major general Higinio Morínigo
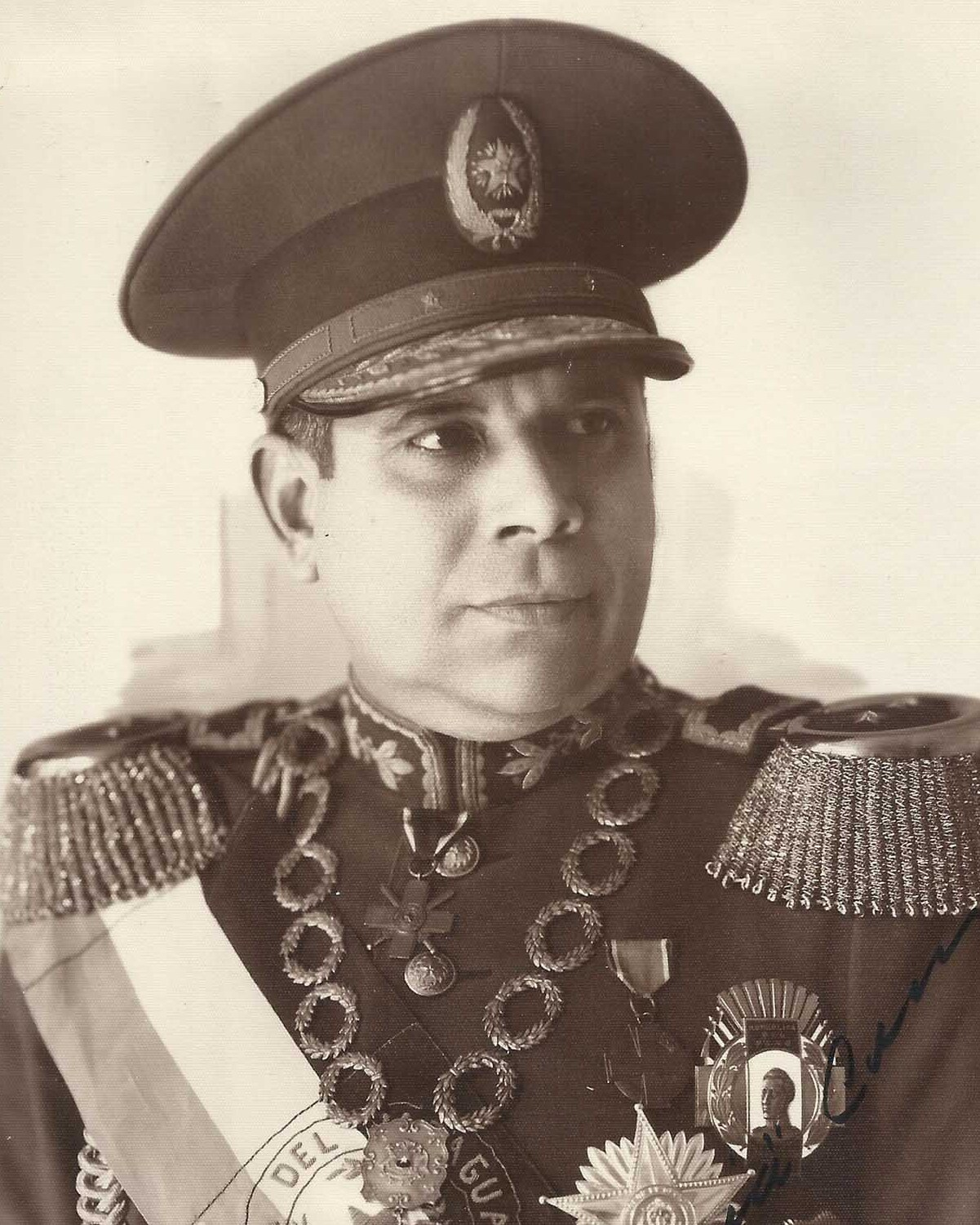
- Portrait, c. 1946

35th President of Paraguay
- In office September 7, 1940 – June 3, 1948
- Preceded by: José Félix Estigarribia
- Succeeded by: Juan Manuel Frutos

Minister of War and Navy of Paraguay
- In office May 17, 1940 – September 7, 1940
- Preceded by: Eduardo Torreani Viera
- Succeeded by: Paulino Ántola

Minister of the Interior of Paraguay
- In office January 25, 1939 – August 15, 1939
- Preceded by: Arturo Bray
- Succeeded by: Nicolás Delgado

Personal details
- Born: Higinio Nicolás Morínigo Martínez; January 11, 1897 Paraguarí, Paraguay
- Died: January 27, 1983 (aged 86) Asunción, Paraguay
- Party: None
- Spouse: Dolores Ferrari (1932–1983)
- Children: Higinio Emilio, Juan Alberto, Guillermo Gerardo

Military service
- Allegiance: Paraguay
- Branch/service: Paraguayan Army
- Years of service: 1922–1948
- Rank: Major General (1940)

Higinio Nicolás Morínigo Martínez (11 January 1897 – 27 January 1983) was a Paraguayan military officer and politician who served as the 35th president of Paraguay from 1940 to 1948, ruling as a military dictator.

Born to a mestizo family, Morínigo pursued a military career, serving as a prominent officer of the Paraguayan Army during the Chaco War. After the war he served in the cabinet of liberal President Félix Paiva. In May 1940, Morínigo was appointed Minister of War by President José Félix Estigarribia. After Estigarribia's death on 7 September, Morínigo succeeded him as acting president.

Due to the new constitution enacted by Estigarribia shortly before his death, which gave immense power to the president, Morínigo was able to establish a military dictatorship. In 1943, after three years serving as acting president, Morínigo was unopposed for a full term, as all political parties were banned.

He was overthrown and was forced to resign in 1948 due to suspicions that he wanted to perpetuate himself in power, despite Juan Natalicio González being chosen as his successor, he was replaced by then President of the Supreme Court of Justice Juan Manuel Frutos as Provisional President.

== Early life and military career ==
Higinio Nicolás Morínigo Martínez was born on 11 January 1897 in Paraguarí, Paraguarí Department, to a mestizo family of merchants. He grew up speaking both Spanish and Guarani.

He attended military college and entered the Paraguayan Army in 1922. He participated in the Chaco War and was appointed the Army's Chief of Staff in 1936. Morínigo gained fame in Paraguay during the February Revolution of 1936 by heading an expedition to the site of the Battle of Cerro Corá to retrieve the remains of Francisco Solano López. President José Félix Estigarribia, himself a Chaco War hero and supporter of the Liberal Party, promoted Morínigo to general and appointed him as Minister of War on May 2, 1940.

After Estigarribia's unexpected death in an airplane crash on September 7, Morínigo was chosen by the army and Liberal ministers as interim President for the two-month period leading to new Presidential elections.

== Dictatorship (1940-1948) ==
On September 30, 1940, after growing disagreements with the President, the Liberal ministers resigned from the government. On October 16 Morínigo announced that the presidential election would be postponed for two years. Soon afterward he announced a policy of "discipline, hierarchy and order" (disciplina, jerarquia, y orden) and stated that persons who spread subversive ideas would be "subject to confinement".

On November 30, Morínigo banned all political parties and imposed a state of siege, which gave him the right to suspend civil liberties and arrest and detain people without trial. In a midday radio address announcing these measures, Morínigo declared, "The people and the Army from this moment will be under a single command." In his self-coup and subsequent rule, he was greatly assisted by the 1940 Constitution, a severely authoritarian document written by Estigarribia a few months earlier that gave the president sweeping executive powers.

To strengthen his authority, on February 4, 1941, Morínigo removed the influential Colonel Peredes from the post of interior minister. On April 17, 1941, he suppressed a febrerista uprising by supporters of the February Revolution.

On April 25, 1942, he banned the Liberal Party, accusing them of conspiring with the Bolivians and exiled Party's leaders. Morínigo's only remaining supporters were radicals from the Colorado Party and the Army. During his dictatorship he faced widespread resistance, including general strikes and military revolts, but he survived by maintaining the loyalty of the Paraguayan Army, which received 45% of the country's budget.

Morínigo relied on the right-wing Colorado faction Guión Rojo (the "Red Banner"), led by Juan Natalico Gonzalez, as a paramilitary police force to intimidate febreristas and Liberals. Opposition newspapers were shut down and publishers exiled.

Morínigo finally held presidential elections on February 15, 1943; he was the sole candidate.

=== Pro-fascist sympathies ===
Just as in other South American countries, pro-Nazi and pro-fascist sympathies at this time were quite strong in the society and among military officers. After it entered World War II in 1941, the United States tried to exert some pressure on Morínigo to limit the influence of Axis supporters. He kept Paraguay neutral for most of the war. He only officially declared war against the Axis in February 1945, without sending any soldiers to fight.

A surge of German influence in the region and Argentina's pro-Axis leanings alarmed the United States, which sought to wean Paraguay away from German and Argentine influence. At the same time, the United States sought to enhance its presence in the region and pursued close cooperation with Brazil, Argentina's traditional rival. To this end, the United States provided to Paraguay sizable amounts of funds and supplies under the Lend-Lease Agreement, provided loans for public works, and gave technical assistance in agriculture and health care. The United States Department of State approved of closer ties between Brazil and Paraguay and especially supported Brazil's offer to finance a road project designed to reduce Paraguay's dependence on Argentina.

United States protests over German and Argentine activities in Paraguay fell on deaf ears. While the United States defined its interests in terms of resisting the fascist threat, Paraguayan officials believed their best interests lay in economic expediency and were reluctant to antagonize Germany until the outcome of the war was no longer in doubt. Many Paraguayans believed Germany was no more of a threat to Paraguay's sovereignty than the United States.

Much to the displeasure of the United States and Britain, Morínigo refused to act against German economic and diplomatic interests until the very end of the war. German agents had successfully converted many Paraguayans to the Axis cause. South America's first Nazi Party branch had been founded in Paraguay in 1931. German immigrant schools, churches, hospitals, farmers' cooperatives, youth groups, and charitable societies became active Axis backers. All of those organizations prominently displayed swastikas and portraits of Adolf Hitler.

Morínigo's regime was pro-Axis. Large numbers of Paraguayan military officers and government officials were openly sympathetic to the Axis. Among these officials was the national police chief, who named his son Adolfo Hirohito after the best-known Axis leaders. By 1941, the official newspaper El País had adopted an overtly pro-German stance. At the same time, the government strictly controlled pro-Allied labor unions. Police cadets wore swastikas and Italian insignia on their uniforms.

The December 1941 Japanese attack on Pearl Harbor and Germany's declaration of war against the United States gave the United States the leverage it needed, however, to force Morínigo to commit himself publicly to the Allied cause. Morínigo officially severed diplomatic relations with the Axis countries in 1942, although he did not declare war against Germany until February 1945. Nonetheless, Morínigo continued to maintain close relations with the heavily German-influenced Argentine military throughout the war and provided a haven for Axis spies and agents.

The outbreak of World War II eased Morínigo's task of ruling Paraguay while keeping the army happy, because it stimulated demand for Paraguayan export products, such as meat, hides, and cotton, and boosted the country's export earnings. More important, United States policy toward Latin America at this time made Paraguay eligible for major economic assistance. Paraguay received American financial help which was used for improving roads and other infrastructure projects.

=== Postwar liberalization ===
Pressure from the US for democratization swept South America after the war. On June 9, 1946, Morínigo dismissed Colonel Benitez Vera, the right-wing head of the army, and crushed a short uprising by Vera's supporters. He then created a civilian coalition government formed by Colorado Party members and leftist febreristas, followers of former dictator Rafael Franco and allowed some political freedoms, going so far as legalizing the Paraguayan Communist Party. Despite all this, in September 1946 he ordered suppression of opposition groups and used the Red Banner paramilitary group to attack the office of the Liberal newspaper El País.

=== Civil war of 1947 ===
Feeling that Morínigo was favouring the right-wing Colorados, the febreristas made common cause with the Liberal Party and the Communist Party in the Civil War of 1947.

The relaxation of the dictatorship was used by political parties to assert their influence in state institutions. In January 1947 officers loyal to the Colorado Party gained control of the army, and on January 11 febreristas quit the government and called on the army to overthrow Morínigo, who responded by declaring a state of siege and arresting febreristas, Liberals and Communists.

On March 7 a bloody civil war started. Despite the fact that 80% of soldiers and 90% of officers were against him, Morínigo had the backing of Colorado party militias and Argentinian President Juan Peron; he managed to win a conflict that caused many thousand deaths and up to 300,000 people to flee as refugees. The future dictator Alfredo Stroessner was one of the few officers who remained loyal to Morínigo during the civil war. For the next 15 years, the Colorados were the only legal party in Paraguay.

=== Removal from power ===
On February 15, 1948, Morínigo organized presidential elections which were won by the only candidate allowed to run, Juan Natalicio González —leader of the Colorado Party's Red Banner faction In return for his support of Gonzalez for president, Morínigo would have continued as commander-in-chief once he relinquished the presidency. Suspecting that Morínigo intended to use this as a means to retain power, on June 3 some Colorado Party loyalists under Felipe Molas López revolted and sent him into exile in Argentina. Supreme Court Chief Justice Juan Manuel Frutos was sworn in as interim president, serving the last two months of Morínigo's term until González was officially inaugurated on August 15, 1948.

== Honors and awards ==
- Argentina: Collar of the Order of the Liberator General San Martín
- Bolivia: Grand Collar of the Order of the Condor of the Andes
- Brazil:
  - Grand Cross of the Order of the Southern Cross
  - Grand Cross of the Order of Military Merit
- Chile: Medal of the Mayor's Office of Valparaíso
- Colombia: Grand Collar of the Order of Boyacá
- Dominican Republic: Grand Cross of the Order of Juan Pablo Duarte
- Ecuador: Grand Collar of the National Order of Merit
- Mexico: Collar of the Order of the Aztec Eagle
- Paraguay:
  - Grand Cross of the National Order of Merit
  - Chaco Cross
  - Cross of the Defender
- Panama: Extraordinary Grand Cross of the Order of Vasco Núñez de Balboa
- Peru:
  - Grand Collar of the Order of the Sun
  - Order of Military Merit
- Venezuela: Collar of the Order of the Liberator

Political offices
Preceded by José Félix Estigarribia	President of Paraguay; 1940–1948	Succeeded by Juan Manuel Frutos
