= United National Liberation Front (Paraguay) =

Paraguayan resistance group

United National Liberation Front (in Spanish: Frente Unido de Liberación Nacional, abbreviated FULNA) was a guerrilla movement controlled by the Paraguayan Communist Party that fought against the regime of dictator Alfredo Stroessner. FULNA was founded in 1960 though by the end of the decade the movement was virtually eradicated by the Paraguayan military with its leaders and members either arrested, executed, imprisoned, tortured, or killed in action. One unit, Columna Mariscal López, continued to exist until the 1970s, when it was finally eradicated.

== History ==
The FULNA was founded in 1959 in Montevideo, Uruguay. Inspired by the Cuban Revolution, the group was primarily composed of militants from the Paraguayan Communist Party who believed armed struggle was the only way to seize power. Despite intending to learn from the mistakes of a previous failed movement (the Movimiento 14 de Mayo), FULNA's strategy was flawed from the outset. Their initial incursion into Paraguay from Argentina in 1960 was a complete disaster. The group received no support from Argentine authorities and was ruthlessly crushed by Stroessner's forces, led by General Patricio Colmán. Repression was extremely brutal, involving torture, disappearances, and "death flights" where prisoners were thrown from airplanes into the Paraná River—a practice conducted with collaboration from Argentine and Uruguayan officials. The failed campaign resulted in the removal of its leader, Óscar Creydt, and the group's efforts to incite a peasant revolution were entirely unsuccessful due to the regime's violent and effective reprisals. The story highlights the futility and devastating human cost of this attempt at armed resistance against Stroessner's well-established dictatorship.

Among its main leaders were Chaco War veterans Fabián Zaldívar Villagra and Lorenzo Arrú.
