= Paraguayan Civil War (1947) =

1947 civil war in Paraguay

1947 Paraguayan Civil War
- Part of the Cold War (from 12 March 1947)
Date	7 March – 20 August 1947 (5 months, 1 week and 6 days)
Location	Paraguay
Result	Government/Military and Colorado Party victory *All other political parties outlawed; Paraguay becomes a one-party state

Belligerents
(Paraguay) Paraguayan government Colorado militias Supported by: Argentina; United States	Liberal Party; Febrerista Revolutionary Concentration; Paraguayan Communist Party

Commanders and leaders
(Paraguay) Higinio Morínigo (Paraguay) Alfredo Stroessner	Rafael Franco; Oscar Creydt

Strength
20,000	3,000

Casualties and losses
- 20,000 killed 800,000 displaced

The Paraguayan Civil War (also known as the Barefoot Revolution and the Third Paraguayan Civil War) was a civil war in Paraguay that lasted from 7 March to 20 August 1947.

== Background ==
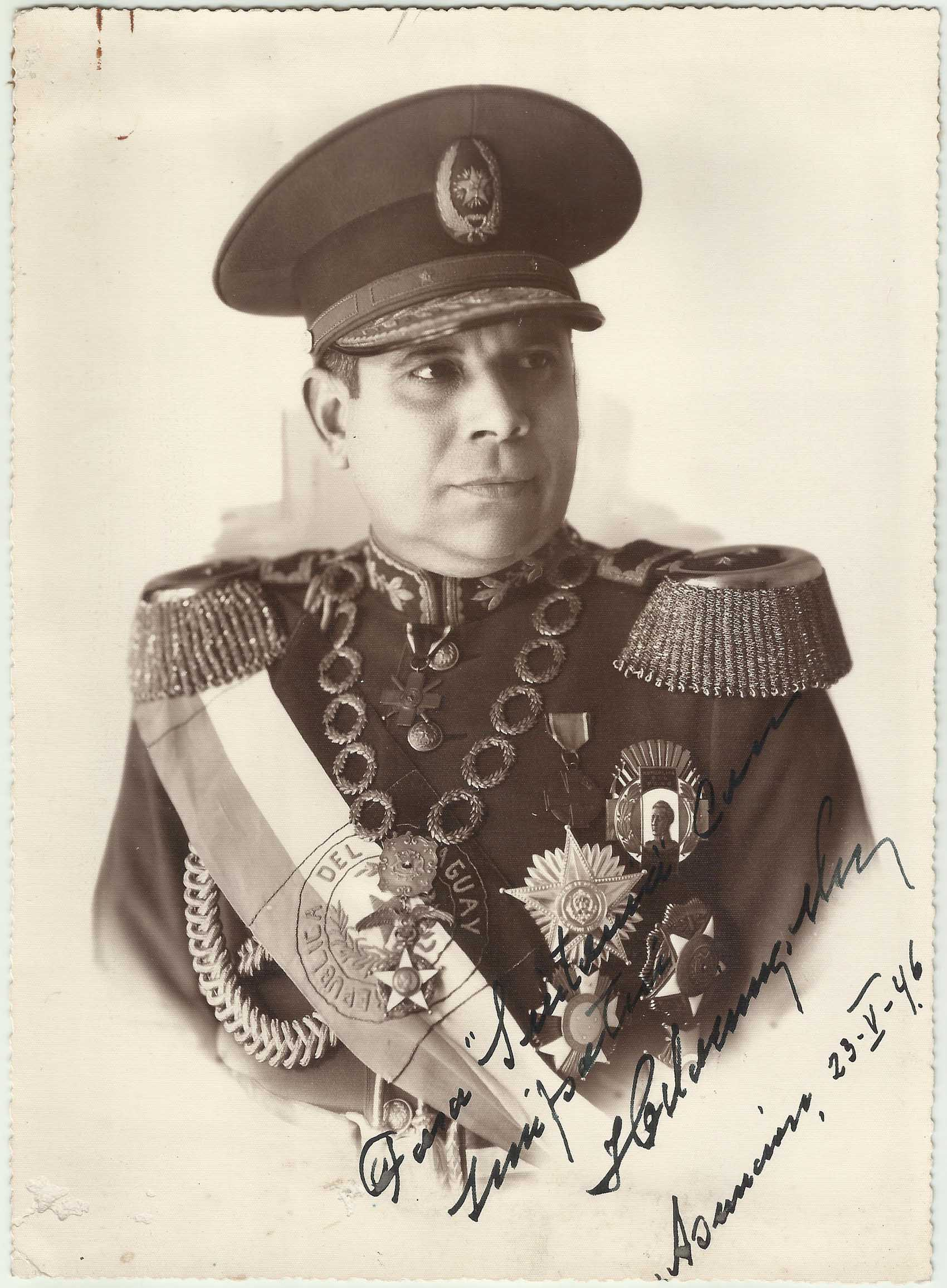
Higinio Morínigo

In 1940 President Higinio Morínigo suspended the constitution and banned political parties. Resistance to his rule took the form of general strikes and student riots. In 1946 Morínigo legalized political activity and formed a cabinet with the Febrerista Revolutionary Concentration and the Colorado Party. The Febreristas resigned from the coalition on January 11, 1947, angry that Morínigo seemed to be favoring the Colorados.

== Conflict ==
The Febreristas made common cause with the Liberal Party and the Paraguayan Communist Party. Former Paraguayan president and founder of the Febrerista Party Rafael Franco led a rebellion that mushroomed into a civil war as the Paraguayan armed forces, which had previously remained loyal, split.

The Communist Party became increasingly active, organizing rural peasants and workers and pushing for agrarian reform. Meanwhile, the United States began a campaign to combat communism throughout the Americas, which included supporting right-wing governments and political movements. As a result, the U.S. backed Juan Natalicio Gonzalez, a wealthy landowner and political ally, in leading the 1947 coup against President Morinigo.

On the rebels' side were all the political parties except the Colorados, most of the bankers and administrators and 80% of military officers. Out of 11 army divisions, four joined the rebels: on March 8 the two infantry divisions at Concepcion rebelled, joined by the two Chaco infantry divisions a few days later.

On the government's side were the Colorados, three cavalry divisions at Campo Grande; three Asunción divisions (infantry, signallers and engineers) and the artillery division from Paraguari equipped with World War II American weapons, specifically M1 Garand rifles and American-supplied captured weapons such as the German MP 40 submachine gun, giving the Colorados superior firepower. Most importantly, Argentina under Juan Perón gave vital support to the government without which they might well have fallen.

On April 27 the navy joined the rebellion and shelled Asunción; they were fought off by the artillery division that had come from Paraguarí, commanded by Gen. Alfredo Stroessner. The largest gunboats of the fleet, Paraguay and Humaita, were seized by the rebels in Buenos Aires while they were undergoing repairs.

Morínigo fought back and eventually gained the upper hand, and had won back control by August 1947. A third of the population had fled.

== See also ==
- List of wars involving Paraguay
