= Pastor Coronel =

Paraguayan politician (1919–2000)

- Born: 9 August 1919; Asunción, Paraguay
- Died: 19 September 2000 (aged 81); Asunción, Paraguay
- Occupations: Politician, torturer

Pastor Milciades Coronel (9 August 1919 – 19 September 2000) was the chief of the Investigations Department during General Alfredo Stroessner's dictatorship of Paraguay. He is considered by human rights activists, like Martín Almada, to be the most feared torturer of the dictatorship. The discovery of the "Archives of Terror" showed that he was the perpetrator of several human rights violations.

== Bibliography ==
- Mellinger de Sannemann, G (1989). Paraguay en el Operativo Cóndor. Asunción: RP Ediciones.
- Almada, M (1993). Paraguay: la cárcel olvidada, el país exiliado. Asunción: Imprenta Salesiana.
