= Paraguayan Communist Party =

Political party in Paraguay

Paraguayan Communist Party Partido Comunista Paraguayo
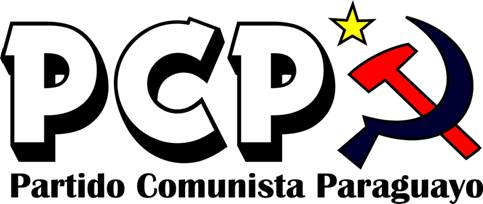
- Leader: Najeeb Amado
- President: Evaristo González
- Founded: 19 February 1928 (98 years ago)
- Headquarters: Brasil 228 c/España, Asunción
- Newspaper: Adelante!
- Youth wing: Paraguayan Communist Youth
- Ideology: Communism; Marxism–Leninism
- Political position: Left-wing to far-left
- Regional affiliation: São Paulo Forum
- International affiliation: IMCWP
- Colours: Red and yellow

Website
- www.pcparaguay.org

The Paraguayan Communist Party (in Spanish: Partido Comunista Paraguayo) is a Marxist-Leninist party political party in Paraguay. PCP was founded on 19 February 1928. Later, it was recognized as a section of the Communist International. It was brutally suppressed during the military regimes in the country. It gained legality for a brief period in 1936 and then again in 1946–1947. After the fall of the Alfredo Stroessner regime, the party re-emerged as a legal party.

== Overview ==
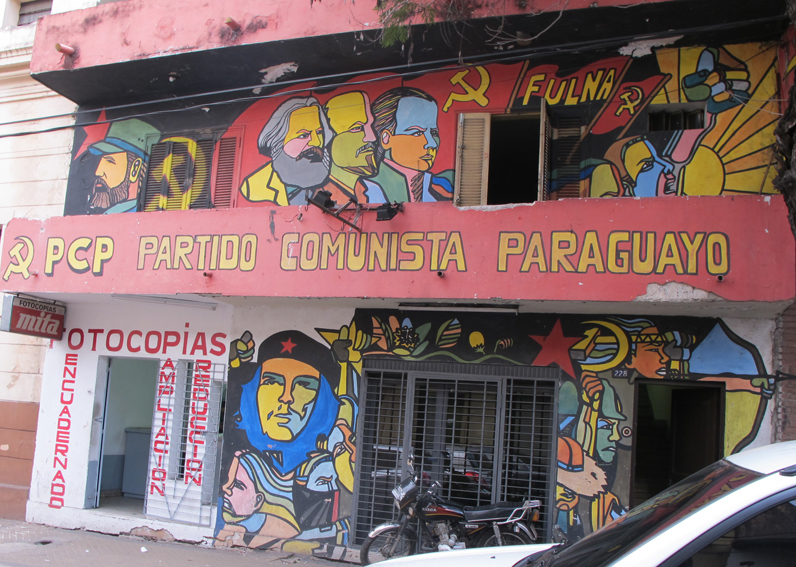
Office of the PCP, Asunción, 2013.

After the Cuban Revolution, the PCP began an armed struggle. Its armed wing was the United National Liberation Front (FULNA). It was defeated in 1963. In 1967, the party split, and the pro-China wing formed the Paraguayan Communist Party (independent). The general secretary of the PCP is Najeeb Amado.

The PCP was a founding member of the United Left (IU) in 2002, but later withdrew in 2003. However, a fraction of the PCP, the Movimiento por la Recuperación Democrática del Partido Comunista Paraguayo, chose to continue to work within IU. The withdrawal was motivated by differences over electoral strategy and candidacy.

On 20 September 2004, a communist party of Paraguay (PC-Paragauay) was founded by faction that split from the PCP, with the secretary general being Miguel Flores.

During the 2008 presidential election, PCP supported the candidate of the Patriotic Alliance for Change, Fernando Lugo, who won the election.

PCP publishes Adelante (Forward).
