= Dictatorship of Alfredo Stroessner =

1954–1989 government in Paraguay

Republic of Paraguay: República del Paraguay (Spanish); Paraguái Tavakuairetã (Guarani)
- 1954–1989
- Flag (1954–1988) Coat of arms
- Motto: Paz y Justicia (Spanish); Peace and Justice
- Anthem: Himno Nacional Paraguayo (Spanish) "Paraguayan National Anthem"
- Capital: Asunción
- Official languages: Spanish
- Common languages: Guarani (Note: The Guarani language wasn't given a co-official language status until 1992.)
- Government: Military dictatorship
- President
  - 1954: Tomás Romero Pereira (Note: Stroessner was the de facto ruler of Paraguay during Pereira's rule.)
  - 1954–1989: Alfredo Stroessner
- Historical era: Cold War
  - Coup d'état: 4 May 1954
  - New Constitution: c. August 1967
  - Transition to Democracy: 3 February 1989
- Currency: Guaraní
- ISO 3166 code: PY
Preceded by	Succeeded by
Paraguay	Paraguay

The dictatorship of Alfredo Stroessner (Spanish: Dictadura de Alfredo Stroessner), colloquially known as the Stronismo or Stronato, was the period of almost 35 years in the history of Paraguay in which army general Alfredo Stroessner ruled the country as a de facto one-party state under a military dictatorship, from 15 August 1954 to 3 February 1989.

== Historical context ==
After World War II and overthrow of the Higinio Moríñigo regime, Juan Natalicio González assumed the Presidency, but he was soon overthrown and followed by Presidents who held power for only a few months each. Some stability was achieved after Federico Chaves was elected on 10 September 1949. Three weeks after taking office, Chaves imposed a state of siege, using his executive emergency powers under the Constitution of 1940 to attack the supporters of González and of ex-President Felipe Molas López.

The growing economic problems after two decades of extreme political and social unrest had undermined and shattered Paraguay's economy. The national and per capita income had fallen sharply. The Central Bank's practice of granting soft loans to the regime's cronies was spurring a rise in inflation and a growing black market. Finally, Argentina's economic problems were also negatively influencing Paraguay. By 1953 political and military support for the 73-year-old Chaves had eroded.

== 1954 military coup ==
Chaves' decision to run for re-election disappointed younger politicians, who wanted power and military officers who did not approve reduction of military's budget in favor of National police. In early 1954 the recently fired Director of Central Bank Epifanio Méndez Fleitas joined forces with General Alfredo Stroessner, who was the Commander-in-chief of the armed forces, in a plot to oust Chaves. Méndez Fleitas was unpopular with Colorado Party stalwarts and the army, who feared that he was trying to create a dictatorship like his hero, President of Argentina Juan Domingo Perón (1946–1955). On 4 May 1954 Stroessner ordered his troops into the streets and staged a coup. Fierce resistance by police left almost fifty dead.

As the military strongman behind the coup, Stroessner was able to place his supporters in positions of power in the provisional government. He then quickly made moves to secure power for himself. About two months later, a divided Colorado Party nominated Stroessner as their presidential candidate for the 1954 elections. The Colorados had been the only legally permitted party since 1947, so this effectively made Stroessner president. For many party members he was a temporary choice, as Morínigo had been for the Liberals in 1940. When Stroessner took office on 15 August 1954, few imagined that this circumspect, unassuming forty-one-year-old would be a master politician capable of outmaneuvering and outlasting them all— or that they were witnessing the start of the fifth and longest of Paraguay's extended dictatorships.

=== Early rule ===
The use of political repression, threats and death squads was a key factor in Stroessner's longevity as dictator of Paraguay. He had virtually unlimited power by giving a free hand to the military and to Minister of Interior Edgar Ynsfrán, who began to harass, terrorize, and occasionally murder family members of the regime's opponents.

Stroessner's rule took a hard-line stance from the beginning. Soon after taking office, he declared a state of siege, which gave him the power to suspend constitutional freedoms. Under the state-of-siege provisions, the government was empowered to arrest and detain anyone indefinitely without trial, as well as forbid public meetings and demonstrations. It was renewed every 90 days until 1987, except for a brief period in 1959. Although it technically only applied to Asunción after 1970, the courts ruled that anyone charged with security offenses could be brought to the capital and charged under the state-of-siege provisions—even if the offense took place outside the capital. Thus, for all intents and purposes, Stroessner ruled under what amounted to martial law for nearly all of his tenure.

The retirement of González and the death of Molas López had removed two of his most formidable opponents and the September 1955 Argentine coup that deposed President Perón deprived Méndez Fleitas of his main potential source of support. Perón fled to Asunción and the new Argentine junta compelled Perón to depart Asunción for Panama in November. Méndez Fleitas prepared to stage a coup in late December. As a result, Stroessner purged the military of Méndez Fleitas' supporters and sent him into exile in 1956.

Stroessner was at the time barely in control of the Colorado Party, which was split in competing factions by rival politicians, while the army was also not a dependable supporter of his rule. The economy was in bad shape and deteriorating further, with inflation growing. His economic austerity measures proved unpopular with the nation's military officers, who had long grown used to getting soft loans from the Central Bank; with fiscally dodgy businessmen, who disliked the severe tightening of credit; and with increasingly poor workers, who organized 1958 Paraguayan general strike demanding increased pay. In addition, the new Argentine government, displeased with Stroessner's cordial relations with Perón, canceled a trade agreement with Paraguay.

=== Guerillas ===
1958 elections gave Stroessner the second Presidential term. The vote was fixed to favor the regime and opposition blossomed into a guerrilla insurgency soon afterwards. Sponsored by exiled Liberals and febreristas, small bands of armed men began to slip across the border from Argentina. Venezuela sent large amounts of aid to these groups starting in 1958. The following year, the new Cuban government under Fidel Castro also provided assistance to the United National Front.

The guerrillas received little support from Paraguay's conservative peasantry. The Colorado Party employed its own militias, the peasant py nandí irregulars ("barefoot ones" in Guaraní) had a well-deserved reputation for ferocity in combat, torture and executing their prisoners. Growing numbers of people were interned in jungle concentration camps. Army troops and police smashed striking labor unions by taking over their organizations and arresting their leaders.

=== Liberalization of 1959 ===
Stroessner decided to accept the growing calls for reform from the army and the Colorado Party. In April 1959 the state of siege was lifted, opposition exiles allowed to return, press censorship ended, political prisoners freed, and a new Constitution promised to replace the authoritarian 1940 Constitution. After two months of this democratic "spring" the country was on the verge of chaos. In late May, nearly 100 people were injured when a student riot erupted in downtown Asunción over a local bus fare increase. The disturbance inspired the legislature to call for Ynsfrán's resignation. Stroessner responded swiftly by reimposing the state of siege and dissolving the legislature. The 1960 parliamentary elections were boycotted by all opposition parties.

== Creating a multiparty dictatorship ==
An upsurge in guerrilla activity and anti-government violence followed, but Stroessner and his colleagues stood firm. Several factors strengthened Stroessner's hand. First, United States military aid was helping enhance the army's skills in counterinsurgency warfare. Second, the many purges of the Colorado Party had removed all opposition factions. In addition, the new economic policy had boosted exports and investment and reduced inflation, and the military coups in Brazil in 1964 and Argentina in 1966 also improved the regional political climate for nondemocratic rule in Paraguay.

Another major factor in Stroessner's favor was a change in attitude among his domestic opposition. Demoralized by years of fruitless struggle, psychological exhaustion and exile, the major opposition groups began to sue for peace. A Liberal Party faction, the Renovation Movement, returned to Paraguay to become the "official" opposition as the Radical Liberal Party (Partido Liberal Radical - PLR).

In the elections of 1963, Stroessner allotted the new party twenty of Congress's sixty seats. Four years later, PLR members also returned to Paraguay and began participating in the electoral process. By this time, the Febreristas, a sad remnant of the once powerful, but never coherent revolutionary coalition, posed no real threat to Stroessner and were legalised in 1964 as Revolutionary Febrerista Party. The new Christian Democratic Party (Partido Demócrata Cristiano - PDC) also renounced insurgency violence as a means of gaining power. This enabled Stroessner to crush the still aggressive Paraguayan Communist Party (Partido Communista Paraguayo - PCP) by mercilessly persecuting its members, families and their spouses and to isolate the exiled Colorado Epifanistas (followers of Epifanio Méndez Fleitas) and Democráticos, who had reorganized themselves as the Popular Colorado Movement (Movimiento Popular Colorado - Mopoco). The American government helped Paraguay fight the communists as part of the Cold War.

Under "liberalization", Ynsfrán, the master of the machinery of terror, began to outlive his usefulness to Stroessner. Ynsfrán opposed political liberalization and was unhappy with Stroessner's increasingly clear intention to stay as President for life. A May 1966 police corruption scandal gave Stroessner a convenient way to dismiss Ynsfrán in November. His replacement, Sabino Augusto Montanaro (a member of the "Cuatrinomio de Oro", a group of politicians intimately connected to Stroessner) continued the same violent policies. In August 1967, after the Constitutional Assembly elections a new Constitution created the two-house Paraguayan legislature and formally allowed Stroessner to serve for two more five-year presidential terms. In 1968 elections and 1973 elections opposition parties were allowed to win seats. In 1977 new Constitution Assembly elections were held and Constitution was amended removing all Presidential term limits allowing Stroessner to win 1978 elections.

=== Growing opposition ===
By skillfully balancing the military and the Colorado Party, Stroessner remained very much in control. He was increasingly being challenged in ways that showed that his control was not complete. For example, in November 1974, police units captured seven guerrillas in a farmhouse outside of Asunción. When the prisoners were interrogated, it was found they were planning to assassinate Stroessner and had information that could have come only from a high Colorado official. With the party hierarchy suddenly under suspicion, Stroessner ordered the arrest and interrogation of over 1,000 senior officials and party members. He also dispatched agents to Argentina and Brazil to kidnap suspects among the exiled Colorados. A massive purge of the party followed. Although the system survived, it was shaken. More mass arrests followed during the Painful Easter of 1976.

Beginning in the late 1960s, leaders in the Roman Catholic Church persistently criticized Stroessner's successive extensions of his stay in office and his treatment of political prisoners. The regime responded by closing Roman Catholic publications and newspapers, expelling non-Paraguayan priests, and harassing the church's attempts to organize the rural poor. Despite all this, the Church still managed to print the newspaper Sendero.

The regime also increasingly came under international fire in the 1970s for human rights abuses, including allegations of torture and murder. In 1978 the Inter-American Commission on Human Rights convinced an annual meeting of foreign ministers at the OAS to pass a resolution calling on Paraguay to improve its human rights situation. In 1980 the Ninth Organization of American States General Assembly, meeting in La Paz, Bolivia, condemned human rights violations in Paraguay, describing torture and disappearances as "an affront to the hemisphere's conscience". International groups also charged that the military had killed 30 peasants and arrested 300 others after the peasants had protested against encroachments on their land by government officials. (See Genocide of indigenous peoples in Paraguay.)

In 1977, Domingo Laíno, a PLR congressman during the previous ten years, broke away to form the Authentic Radical Liberal Party (Partido Liberal Radical Auténtico - PLRA) in a late 1970s rise in political activity. Laíno's charges of government corruption, involvement in narcotics trafficking, human rights violations, and inadequate financial compensation from Brazil under the terms of the Treaty of Itaipú earned him Stroessner's wrath. In 1979 Laíno helped lead the PLRA, the PDC, Mopoco, and the legally recognized Febreristas, the latter angered by the constitutional amendment allowing Stroessner to seek yet another presidential term in 1978, into the National Accord (Acuerdo Nacional). The National Accord served to coordinate the opposition's political strategy. The victim of countless detentions, torture, and persecution, Laíno was forced into exile in 1982 following the publication of a critical book about ex-Nicaraguan dictator Anastasio Somoza Debayle. Somoza had found a refuge in Paraguay, even publishing a book, Nicaragua Betrayed, before being assassinated in Asunción in 1980. The assassination of Somoza also showed growing weaknesses. From Stroessner's standpoint, there were ominous similarities between Somoza and himself. Like Stroessner, Somoza had run a regime based on the military and a political party that had been noted for its stability and its apparent ability to resist change. Somoza had brought economic progress to the country and had skillfully kept his internal opposition divided for years. Ultimately, however, the carefully controlled changes he had introduced began subtly to undermine the traditional, authoritarian order. As traditional society broke down in Paraguay, observers saw increasing challenges ahead for the Stroessner regime.

== International relations and the economy ==
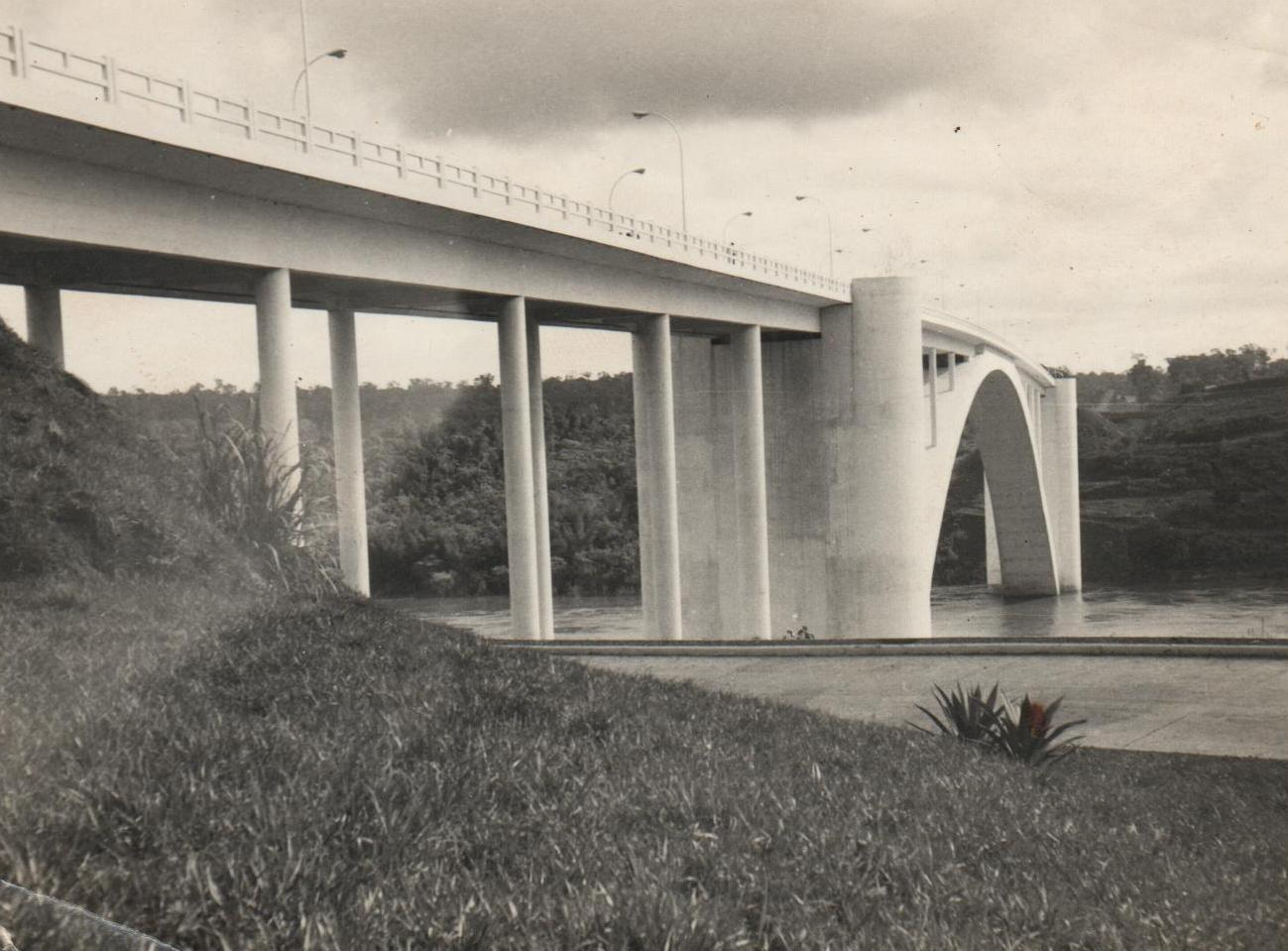
Friendship Bridge between Paraguay and Brazil, 1965

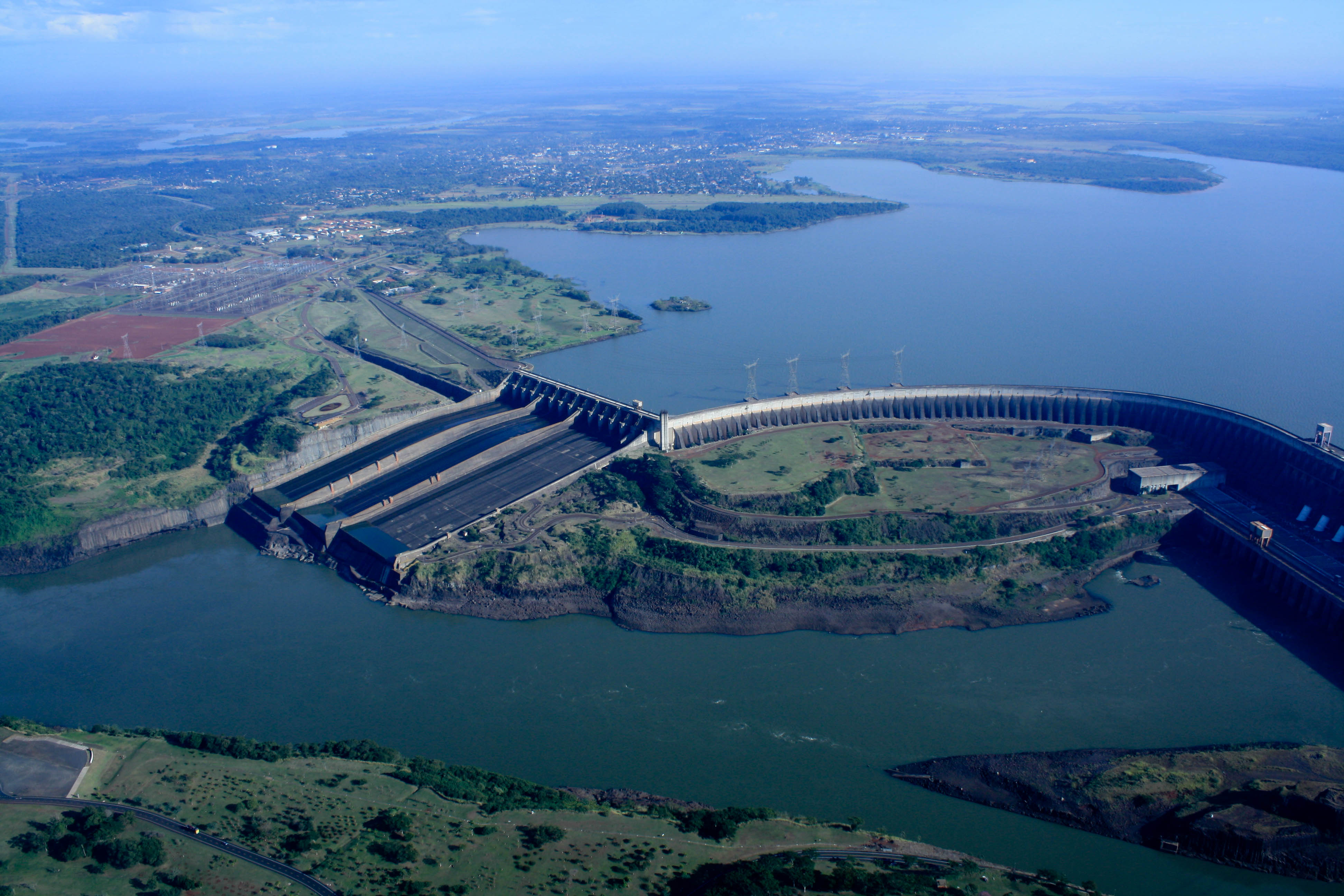
Itaipu Dam

During the 1960s and 1970s, the main foreign influences on Paraguay were Brazil and the United States. Both countries aided Paraguay's economic development in ways that enhanced its political stability. A 1956 agreement with Brazil to improve the transport link between the two countries by building roads and a bridge over the Paraná River broke Paraguay's traditional dependence on Argentine goodwill for the smooth flow of Paraguayan international trade. Brazil's grant of duty-free port facilities on the Atlantic Coast was particularly valuable to Paraguay.

Brazil's financing of the US$19 billion Itaipú Dam on the Paraná River between Paraguay and Brazil had far-reaching consequences for Paraguay; it had no means of contributing financially to the construction, but its cooperation, including controversial concessions regarding ownership of the construction site and the rates for which Paraguay agreed to sell its share of the electricity, was essential. Itaipú gave Paraguay's economy a new source of wealth. The construction produced a tremendous economic boom, as thousands of Paraguayans who had never before held a regular job went to work on the enormous dam. From 1973 (when construction began) until 1982 (when it ended), gross domestic product grew more than 8 percent annually, double the rate for the previous decade and higher than growth rates in most other Latin American countries. Foreign exchange earnings from electricity sales to Brazil soared, and the newly employed Paraguayan workforce stimulated domestic demand, bringing about a rapid expansion in the agricultural sector.

There were, however, several drawbacks to the construction at Itaipú. The prosperity associated with the major boom raised expectations for long-term growth. An economic downturn in the early 1980s caused discontent, which in turn led to demands for reform. Many Paraguayans, no longer content to eke out a living on a few hectares, had to leave the country to look for work. In the early 1980s, some observers estimated that up to 60 percent of Paraguayans were living outside the country. Even those people who were willing to farm a small patch of ground faced a new threat. Itaipú had prompted a tidal wave of Brazilian migration in the eastern border region of Paraguay. By the mid-1980s, observers estimated there were between 300,000 and 350,000 Brazilians in the eastern border region. With Portuguese the dominant language in the areas of heavy Brazilian migration and Brazilian currency circulating as legal tender, the area became closely integrated with Brazil. Further, most of Paraguay's increased wealth wound up in the hands of wealthy supporters of the regime. Landowners faced no meaningful land reform, the regime's control of labor organizers aided businessmen, foreign investors benefited from tax exemptions, and foreign creditors experienced a bonanza from heavy Paraguayan borrowing. Although the poorest Paraguayans were somewhat better off in 1982 than they were in the 1960s, they were worse off relative to other sectors of the population. Agricultural policy for much of the regime was headed by Juan Manuel Frutos Fleitas, who oversaw the creation of the Rural Welfare Institute (Instituto de Bienestar Rural—IBR). From 1963 to the late 1980s, the IBR titled millions of hectares of land and created hundreds of colonies, directly affecting the circumstances of roughly one-quarter of the population. The IBR, however, was criticized for having a pronounced political bias, with land being primarily allocated to supporters of Stroessner and his regime.

Closer relations with Brazil paralleled a decline in relations with Argentina. After Perón's expulsion, Paraguay slipped from the orbit of Buenos Aires as Argentina declined politically and economically. Argentina, alarmed by Itaipú and close cooperation between Brazil and Paraguay, pressed Stroessner to agree to participate in hydroelectric projects at Yacyretá and Corpus. By pitting Argentina against Brazil, Stroessner improved Paraguay's diplomatic and economic autonomy and its economic prospects.

Stroessner also benefited from the 1950s and 1960s Cold War ideology in the United States, which favored anti-communist governments. In 1957 Paraguay established diplomatic relations with Taiwan. Upon reaching Asunción during his 1958 tour of Latin America, Vice President Richard Nixon praised Stroessner's Paraguay for opposing communism more strongly than any other nation in the world. The main strategic concern of the United States at that time was to avoid the emergence a left-wing regime in Paraguay, which would be ideally situated at the heart of the South American continent to provide a haven for radicals and a base for revolutionary activities around the hemisphere. From 1947 until 1977, the United States supplied about US$750,000 worth of military hardware each year and trained more than 2,000 Paraguayan military officers in counter-intelligence and counterinsurgency. In 1977 the United States Congress sharply cut military assistance to Paraguay.

Paraguay regularly voted in favor of United States policies in the United Nations and the Organization of American States. Stroessner, probably the United States' most dependable ally in Latin America, once remarked that the United States ambassador was like an extra member of his cabinet. Relations faltered somewhat during the administration of President John F. Kennedy, as United States officials began calling for democratic rule and land reform and threatened to withhold Alliance for Progress funds (an amount equal to about 40 percent of Paraguay's budget) unless Paraguay made progress. Although pressure of this sort no doubt encouraged Stroessner to legalize some internal opposition parties, it failed to make the Paraguayan ruler become any less a personalist dictator. Regime opponents who agreed to play Stroessner's electoral charade received rewards of privileges and official recognition. Other opponents, however, faced detention and exile. Influenced by Paraguay's support for the United States intervention in the Dominican Republic in 1965, the United States became friendlier to Stroessner in the mid-1960s under President Lyndon B. Johnson. New United States supported military governments in Brazil and Argentina also improved United States-Paraguay ties.

Relations between Paraguay and the United States changed substantially after the election of President Jimmy Carter in 1976. The appointment of Robert White as United States ambassador in 1977 and the congressional cut-off of military hardware deliveries in the same year reflected increasing concern about the absence of democratic rule and the presence of human rights violations in Paraguay. Paraguay also lost the Filártiga v. Peña-Irala torture case.

Beyond the financial support he received from the United States, which supported his anti-communist struggle, his regime was characterized by corruption and the distribution of favors among what was known as "the trilogy": the government, the Colorado Party and the armed forces. Smuggling—geographically favoured by Paraguay's location between Brazil, Argentina and Bolivia—became one of the main sources of income, ranging from alcohol and drugs to cars and exotic animals. Some estimate that the volume of smuggling was three times the official export figure. Stroessner used some of that money, as well as slices of major infrastructure works and the delivery of land, to buy the loyalty of his officers, many of whom amassed huge fortunes and large estates.

The concentration of wealth and land in the hands of a few made Paraguay the most unequal country on the planet. Humanitarian organizations such as Oxfam and Amnesty International have denounced that it continues to have one of the highest rates of land concentration in Latin America. According to Oxfam, 1.6% of the population owns 80% of the land as a direct consequence of the Stroessner regime: between 1954 and 1989 some 8 million hectares, a third of the total amount of arable land, were distributed irregularly among people personally connected to Stroessner.

== Torture and murder ==
Most Latin American dictatorships have regularly instituted extrajudicial killings of their enemies; for one of the better-known examples, see Operation Condor, which Paraguay participated in. Records about its victims, the so-called Archives of Terror, were discovered in 1992.

The United States helped General Stroessner in many ways. It sent U.S. Army officer Lieutenant Colonel Robert Thierry to help the local workmen to build a detention and interrogation center named La Technica as part of Operation Condor. La Technica then became a well known torture center. Among the most feared torturers were Pastor Coronel, Antonio Campos Alum and Ramón Aquino.

== Overthrow ==
Paraguay had entered the 1980s less isolated and rural than it had traditionally been, but more than half of the population was still rural. Political and social structures remained inflexible, but Paraguayans had changed their world views and their perceptions of themselves. 1983 elections and 1988 elections were manipulated to deliver nearly 90% of the votes for Stroessner, while maintaining the fiction of a multiparty system.

On 3 February 1989, Stroessner was overthrown in a military coup headed by General Andrés Rodríguez. He went into exile in Brazil, where he died in 2006. At the time of his death, Stroessner was the defendant in several human rights cases in Paraguay.

Rodríguez won the presidency in a multi-party election held in May 1989 to complete Stroessner's term, in which the Colorado Party also dominated the Congress. In the aftermath of the coup, one of the immediate results was that rural Paraguayans occupied unused lands "claimed by the state, the Stroessner family and its cronies, and foreign investors." They set up huts and cleared land to grow staples of manioc and corn. "They were soon followed by thousands more. By mid-1990, observers and representatives of the occupants estimated that roughly 19,000 families had claimed lands totaling over 360,000 hectares." This happened mostly in the eastern and northern border departments, a frontier zone, but it occurred in other rural areas as well. At the time, 2.06 million people of the 4.1 million total population were still rural.

In the newly created municipal elections of 1991, opposition candidates won several major urban centers, including Asunción. As president, Rodríguez instituted political, legal, and economic reforms and initiated a rapprochement with the international community.

== See also ==
- Itaipu Dam
- Politics of Paraguay
