= 1993 Paraguayan general election =

- 9 May 1993
- Presidential election
- Turnout: 69.46%
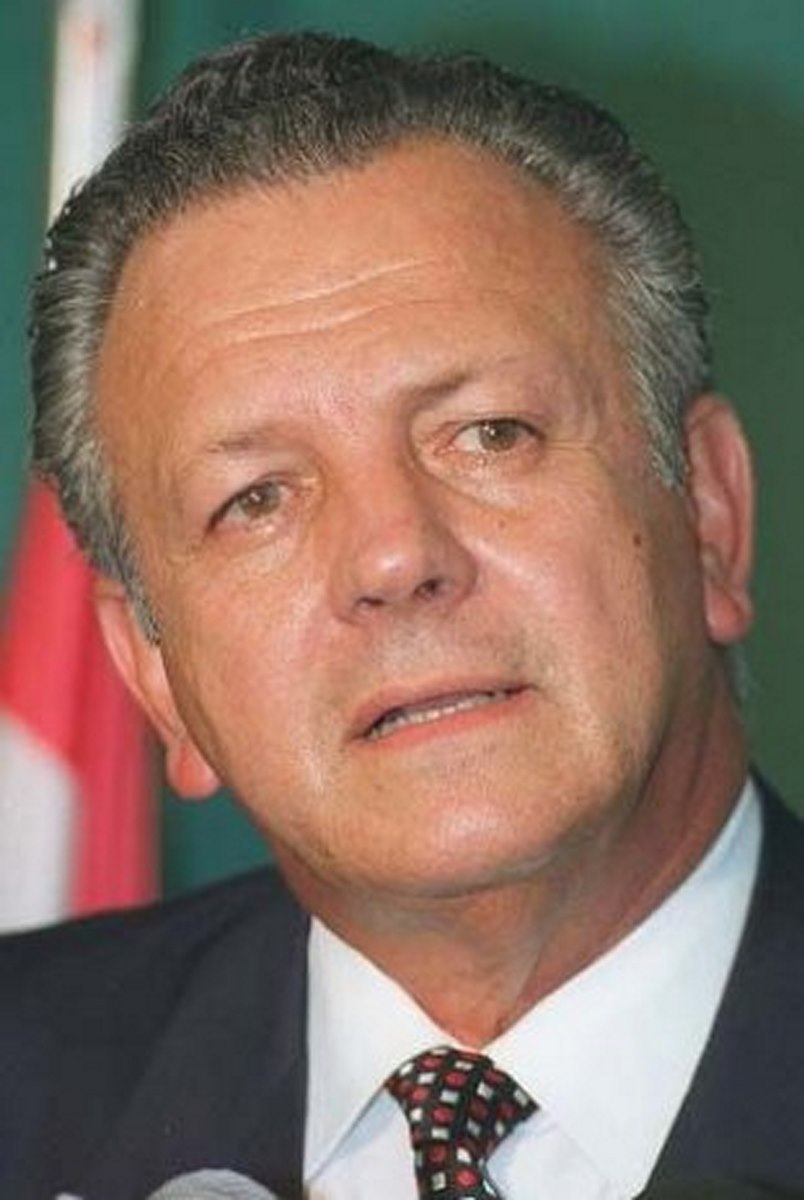

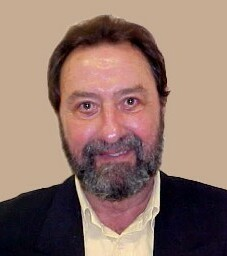

Candidate	Juan Carlos Wasmosy	Domingo Laíno	Guillermo Caballero Vargas
Party	Colorado	PLRA	PEN
Popular vote	449,505	357,164	262,407
Percentage	41.78%	33.20%	24.39%
- Results by department
President before election
Andrés Rodríguez
Colorado
President-elect
Juan Carlos Wasmosy
Colorado
- Chamber of Deputies
- All 80 seats in the Chamber of Deputies; 41 seats needed for a majority
Party	Leader	Vote %	Seats	+/–
Colorado	Juan Carlos Wasmosy	43.41	38	−10
PLRA	Domingo Laíno	36.82	33	+12
PEN	Guillermo Caballero Vargas	17.70	9	New
This lists parties that won seats. See the complete results below.
- Senate
- All 45 seats in the Senate; 23 seats needed for a majority
Party	Vote %	Seats	+/–
Colorado	44.05	20	0
PLRA	36.20	17	New
PEN	17.95	8	New
This lists parties that won seats. See the complete results below.

General elections were held in Paraguay on 9 May 1993. They featured the first free presidential elections in the country's 182-year history, (or second, depending on the source), and the first with no military candidates since 1928. They were also the first regular elections since the adoption of a new constitution the previous summer. The presidential election was the first regular presidential election since the overthrow of longtime leader Alfredo Stroessner in 1989. The 1989 coup's leader, Andrés Rodríguez, became provisional president before winning a special election for the remainder of Stroessner's eighth term.

Rodríguez had promised not to run for a full term. He would have been prevented from doing so by the new constitution, which limited the president to a single five-year term. The term limit applied even if a president had only served a partial term.

Juan Carlos Wasmosy of the Colorado Party won the presidential election with 41.8 percent of the vote. He took office on 15 August, becoming the first civilian to hold the post in 39 years.

The Colorado Party remained the largest party in the Chamber of Deputies and the Senate, but lost the absolute majority it had held since 1963. The opposition Authentic Radical Liberal Party and National Encounter Party together held a majority of the seats in both chambers, later supplemented by the Colorado Reconciliation Movement, which broke away from the Colorado Party. Voter turnout was 69% in the presidential and Senate elections and 68% in the Chamber elections.

== Conduct ==
The elections were not entirely peaceful. On election day an opposition television channel was raked by gunfire, and government officials cut the phone lines of opposition parties and independent election monitors. However, the phone lines were restored after intervention from Jimmy Carter. Despite confirmed cases of fraud, independent analysts concluded that the fraudulent activity had no effect on the outcome, and that Wasmosy's eight-point margin of victory was large enough to offset any illicit activity. Carter's team of international observers noted that opposition candidates tallied almost 60 percent of the vote between them.

The elections completed a transition to full democracy in a country that had seen only two years of pluralism in its history before the 1989 coup. For much of the time before 1989, opposition had been barely tolerated, even when it was nominally legal. Even after Stroessner lifted a three-decade state of siege in 1987, opposition parties and newspapers continued to be suppressed, often brutally. In this climate, Stroessner had won all six of his contested bids for president (he appeared alone on the ballot in 1954 and 1958) with 70 percent or more of the vote, only dropping below 80 percent once.

== Results ==
=== President ===
Candidate	Party	Votes	%
Juan Carlos Wasmosy	Colorado Party	449,505	41.78
Domingo Laíno	Authentic Radical Liberal Party	357,164	33.20
Guillermo Caballero Vargas	National Encounter Party	262,407	24.39
Ricardo Nicolás Canese Krivoshein	Social Democratic Coalition (PDC–PHP)	1,601	0.15
Eduardo María Arce Schaerer	Workers' Party	1,536	0.14
Joel Atilio Cazal	Broad Movement National Participation	1,104	0.10
Leandro Jesus Prieto Yegros	Social Political Movement Progressive	1,087	0.10
Abraham Zapag Bazas	Liberal Party	881	0.08
Gustavo Bader Ibáñez	Socialist National Party	655	0.06
Total		1,075,940	100.00
Valid votes		1,075,940	91.18
Invalid/blank votes		104,142	8.82
Total votes		1,180,082	100.00
Registered voters/turnout		1,698,984	69.46
Source: Justicia Electoral

=== Senate ===
Party	Votes	%	Seats
Colorado Party	498,586	44.05	20
Authentic Radical Liberal Party	409,728	36.20	17
National Encounter Party	203,213	17.95	8
Other parties	20,411	1.80	0
Total	1,131,938	100.00	45
Valid votes	1,131,938	96.05	
Invalid/blank votes	46,504	3.95	
Total votes	1,178,442	100.00	
Registered voters/turnout	1,698,984	69.36	
Source: Nohlen

=== Chamber of Deputies ===
Party	Votes	%	Seats	+/–
Colorado Party	488,342	43.41	38	–10
Authentic Radical Liberal Party	414,208	36.82	33	+12
National Encounter Party	199,053	17.70	9	New
Other parties (Note: Included the Workers' Party, the Social Democratic Coalition (PDC–PHP), the Liberal Party, the MAPN, MPSP and PNS.)	23,275	2.07	0	–
Total	1,124,878	100.00	80	+8
Valid votes	1,124,878	96.01		
Invalid/blank votes	46,805	3.99		
Total votes	1,171,683	100.00		
Registered voters/turnout	1,698,984	68.96		
Source: Nohlen
