= Movimiento Popular Colorado =

Popular Colorado Movement Movimiento Popular Colorado
- Founded: 15 May 1960
- Dissolved: 1989
- Merged into: Colorado Party
- Ideology: Anti-Stronism
- Political position: Centre

The Movimiento Popular Colorado (Popular Colorado Movement), better known as MOPOCO, was an internal movement within the Colorado Party of Paraguay that advocated for more democracy and social justice in the country. It was founded in 1959 as a response to the cruelty of the dictatorship of Alfredo Stroessner, and as one of the opposition groups to his rule, it suffered heavy repression at the hands of the regime.

== History ==
The MOPOCO has its origins in 1959, when a group of young activists from the Colorado Party won the elections of the Central Committee of Youth of the party. At this point the country was in the middle of the long Stroessner dictatorship, and these activists proposed several reforms: partisan freedom, respect for popular sovereignty, and an ethical conduct of politics. On March 12 of the year the movement was founded, and the members of the latter published the "Note of the 17", in which they demanded that the Governing Board of the Colorado Party adopt measures such as "the lifting of the State of Siege", and respect the "full validity of all freedoms". Days after this statement was published, MOPOCO was expelled from the ANR, and its leaders began facing heavy persecution.

With the expulsion of MOPOCO from the Colorado Party, the main leaders had to go into exile. And it was in Resistencia, Argentina, in March 1960, where they held their first congress. The first elected president of the movement was José Zacarías Arza. During that convention, MOPOCO joined forces with Epifanio Méndez Fleitas, a former ally of Stroessner who went into exile and became a fierce critic of the regime. In 1973, MOPOCO and the "epifanists" would separate, since the latter would found a new dissident group, the Asociación Nacional Republicana en el Exilio y la Resistencia (ANRER).

At the 1962 ANR convention, some MOPOCO militants attempted the last participation of the movement in the headquarters of the Colorados, when some militants tried to obtain the lifting of the sanction that weighed on the leaders of the movement, but this was unsuccessful, and the group remained in exile, participating in seminars and debates. They also published the Patria Libre newspaper, which harshly criticized the Stroessner dictatorship. At this point, MOPOCO leader Agustín Goiburú also tried to hijack a Paraguayan military plane and land it in Punta del Este, Uruguay in order to expose the dictatorship's crimes, but this plan was foiled.

In 1979, the Movimiento Popular Colorado joined forces with the Revolutionary Febrerista Party, the Christian Democratic Party and the Authentic Radical Liberal Party joined forces and formed a united opposition front called the National Agreement, promoting the re-establishment of democracy in Paraguay.

In the 1980s, MOPOCO began pressing its militants to return the country to fight against the dictatorship in all possible ways. In 1983, the president of the movement, Dr. Miguel Ángel González Casabianca, would enter the country through Encarnación. That would mark a new stage for MOPOCO, where more and more exiled militants would return to put pressure on the dictatorship. At this point, dissent against Stroessner was growing within the Colorado Party, as many were dissatisfied with the President's refusal to step down. This movement grew in strength until the coup d'état of 2 and 3 February 1989, when Stroessner was deposed and replaced by his former confidant, Andrés Rodríguez Pedotti, with the support of the army. With the fall of the dictatorship of Alfredo Stroessner, MOPOCO decided to re-enter the ranks of the Colorado Party, considering that its fight for the return of democracy to Paraguay had come to an end. Some of the movement's members became advisor in the subsequent Rodríguez government.

== Notable members ==
- Waldino Ramón Lovera
- Agustín Goiburú
- Silvestre Gómez Rolón
- Enrique Riera Figueredo
- Miguel Ángel González Casabianca
- José María Olmedo Montania
- Eduardo San Martín
- José Ángel Orihuela
- José Zacarías Arza
- Ángel Florentín Peña
- Luis Oscar Boettner
- Mario Mallorquín
- Cap. Valiente Gómez
- Heriberto Florentín Peña
- Bernardino Cano Yegros
- Bernardino Cano Radil
