= Revolutionary Febrerista Party =

Political party in Paraguay

Revolutionary Febrerista Party Partido Revolucionario Febrerista
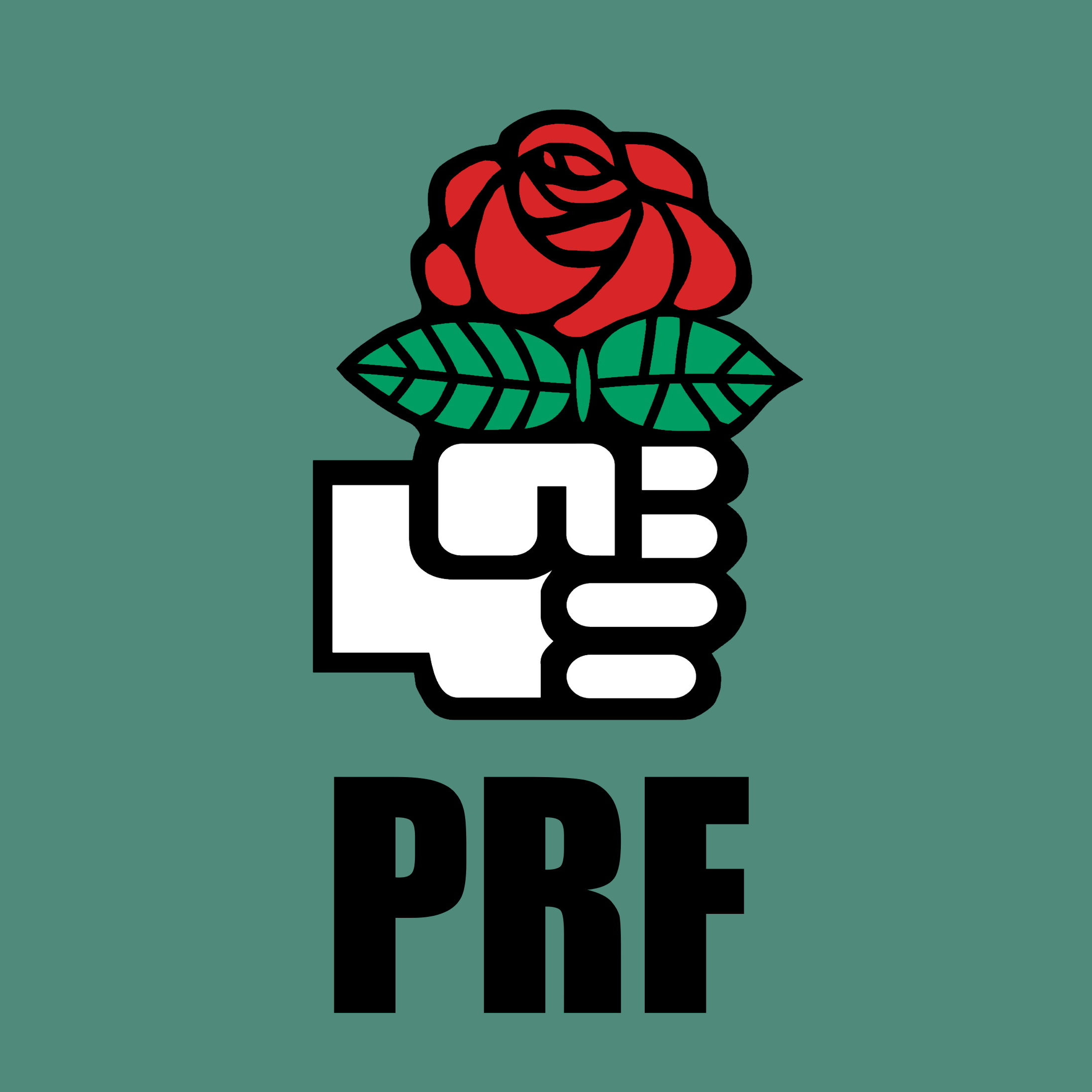
- President: Josefina Duarte
- Founder: Rafael Franco
- Founded: 11 December 1951
- Headquarters: Casa del Pueblo, Manduvirá Nº 522; Asunción, Paraguay
- Youth wing: Juventud Revolucionaria Febrerista
- Ideology: Social democracy Left-wing nationalism Progressivism; Indigenismo; Historical: Democratic socialism
- Political position: Centre-left; Historical: Left-wing
- National affiliation: Concertación
- Regional affiliation: São Paulo Forum
- Colours: Green

Party flag

Website
- Partido Revolucionario Febrerista

The Revolutionary Febrerista Party (Spanish: Partido Revolucionario Febrerista, PRF) is a social democratic political party in Paraguay. It was established in 1951 by Rafael Franco, President of Paraguay from the February Revolution of 1936 until his overthrow in August 1937.

== History ==
In 1936, Rafael Franco came to power in the February Revolution. A year and a half later, he was overthrown in a coup that brought the Liberal Party's Félix Paiva to power and went into exile. Franco established the Revolutionary Febrerista Party, named after the revolution, on 11 December 1951 in Buenos Aires, Argentina.

The party was initially banned in Paraguay, which was under a Colorado Party regime at the time. The party was legalised in 1964 as it was no longer deemed to be a threat to President Alfredo Stroessner. In the 1967 Constitutional Assembly elections, it won three of the 120 seats. In the general elections the following year, the party failed to win a Senate seat but won one seat in the Chamber of Deputies.

After 1968, the party did not contest another national election until the overthrow of the Stroessner regime in 1989. In the elections that year, they won two seats in the Chamber of Deputies. In the 1991 Constitutional Assembly elections, they won a single seat. For the 1993 elections, it was part of the National Encounter Party coalition, which finished third. The party ran alone in the 1998 elections but failed to win a seat. They also failed to win a seat in the 2003 elections. For the 2008 elections, the party was part of the Patriotic Alliance for Change, which won two seats.

== Electoral history ==
=== Presidential elections ===
Election	Party candidate	Votes	%	Result
1968	Carlos Caballero Gatti	16,871	2.6%	Lost ✗
1989	Fernando Antonio Vera Sánchez	11,007	0.95%	Lost ✗
1993	None (endorsed Guillermo Caballero Vargas)	262,407	24.39%	Lost ✗
1998	Luis Alberto Campos Doria	8,139	0.51%	Lost ✗
2008	None (endorsed Fernando Lugo)	764,968	41.20%	Elected ✓

=== Chamber of Deputies elections ===
Chamber of Deputies
Election	Votes	%	Seats	+/–
1968	16,871	2.6%	1 / 60	▲1
1989	23,815	2.1%	2 / 72	▲2
1993	199,053 (as part of NEP)	17.7%	9 / 80	▲7
1998	20,121	1.3%	0 / 80	▼9
2003	11,542	0.8%	0 / 80	Steady
2008	520	0.03%	0 / 80	Steady
2018	15,169	0.64%	0 / 80	Steady

=== Senate elections ===
Senate
Election	Votes	%	Seats	+/–
1968	Not released	Not released	0 / 30	Steady
1993	203,213 (as part of NEP)	17.9%	8 / 45	▲8
1998	16,667	1.1%	0 / 45	▼8
2003	10,202	0.7%	0 / 45	Steady
2018	14,332	0.61%	0 / 45	Steady

== Bibliography ==
- Nohlen, Dieter (2005). Elections in the Americas: A data handbook, Volume II. ISBN 978-0-19-928358-3.
