= Agustín Goiburú =

Paraguayan politician (1930–1977)

Agustín Goiburú (August 28, 1930 – February 2, 1977) was a Paraguayan politician. He was the leader of the Popular Colorado Movement that represented the strongest opposition to the dictatorship of Alfredo Stroessner. He was murdered during the Operation Condor. He was a doctor, specialized in orthopedic surgery in Brazil. When he returned to the country, he worked in the Social Prevention Institute and in the Police Policlinic “Rigoberto Caballero”.

== Career ==
Besides his work in the field of medicine, he had a long militancy in the Colorado Party, political movement that supported the government of the general Alfredo Stroessner who had assumed as president in 1954. The constants denunciation of Human Rights violation Goiburú made against the government of Stroessner led him to be a part of the group of Colorado Leaders that in 1959 was forced to leave the country in exile. Goiburú took refuge in the Uruguayan embassy, along with the artist Teodoro S. Mongelós and other activists that together would conform in the exile, the dissident movement MOPOCO.

He first moved to Santa Ana, and later on, in the Argentine border city, Posadas. There, he continued working as a doctor. During the years he lived there, he denounced to the press that in the Paraná River, the river that divides Paraguay from Argentina, rotting corpses floated, with signs of torture on their bodies. They were the bodies of the members of the uprising movement called “14 de Mayo” that had been thrown of plains that flew over the border. The Interior Minister, Edgar L. Ynsfrán and the Chief of Police, Ramón Duarte Vera were accused of planning that massive repression.

== Failed kidnapping ==
In 1962, Goiburú tried to expose the Paraguayan situation to the international community by planning the kidnapping of the government plane TAM (Military Air Transportation) that landed in Encarnación, the Paraguayan city that was next to Posadas, divided by the Paraná River. His objective was to land the plane in Punta del Este, Uruguay, where the meeting of the Latin-Americans chancellors would take place. However, the government became aware of Goiburú’s plans and decided to capture him in an operative that Goiburú managed to escape from almost miraculously. On November 24, 1969, he was kidnapped for the first time. He was fishing in the Paraná River with his eleven – years old son Rolando, and a few construction workers, when he was interrupt by a military boat with naval Paraguayans officers. His boat was towed to the coast, along with his son Rolando who returned to Posadas. The construction workers remained in jail for over a year and Goiburú was immediately sent to Asunción on a military plane. He remained missing for several months when, in fact, he was in an Army’s basement in the Capital. After his wife denounced his disappearance, he was moved to different police stations across the Capital. Finally, he remained in the police station nº7th where, on December 3, 1970, he managed to escape, once again, spectacularly, one year and nine days after he was captured. He took refuge in the Chilean embassy, with the protection of the socialist Chilean government of Popular Unity, and even traveled to Santiago de Chile, but shortly, he was once again in Posadas, right next to Paraguay.

== Assassination attempt ==
Convinced that the only way Stroessner would leave the government was through violence, in 1974, Goiburú gathered a group of activist of the MOPOCO and a few Paraguayans students from the University of La Plata to plan the assassination of the dictator. The plan was to load with explosives a van that would be parked in a street that was a part of the itinerary of Stroessner, near the railroad station. The operative failed several times because of various motives and finally was found out by the police thanks to a navy officer called Evasio Benítez that had been contacted by one of the involved to buy some explosives.

== Kidnapping ==
When Goiburú realized that he was being followed and spied, he realized it was no longer safe to live in Posadas and decided to move to Paraná (Entre Ríos), a city that was many kilometers away of the Paraguayan border. Nevertheless, on February 9, 1977, an operative in which Paraguay and Argentina joined forces, managed to kidnap him. His body never was found in spite the efforts of his family. In the year 2006, the Interamerican Court of Justice condemned the State of Paraguay for the murder of Agustín Goiburú and its poor attempts to investigate the truth of his death.

== See also ==
- Pastor Coronel
- Alfredo Stroessner

== Bibliography ==
- La década inconclusa - Alfredo Boccia Paz
- Archivo Nacional de Asunción. Diversos
