= Radical Liberal Party =

Radical Liberal Party may refer to:

- Radical Liberal Party (Luxembourg), a political party in Luxembourg
- Radical Liberal Party (Paraguay), a political party in Paraguay
- Authentic Radical Liberal Party, a political party in Paraguay
- Unified Radical Liberal Party, a political party in Paraguay
- Ecuadorian Radical Liberal Party, a political party in Ecuador
- Radical Liberal Party, a fictional left-wing Confederate party and the main opposition of the Whig Party in the Southern Victory series

== See also ==
- Liberal Party (disambiguation)
- Liberal radicalism (disambiguation)
