= Liberal Party (Paraguay) =

1887–1993 political party in Paraguay

Liberal Party Partido Liberal
- Founded: 1887; 1963 (reconstituted)
- Dissolved: 1993
- Merged into: Authentic Radical Liberal Party
- Headquarters: Asunción
- Ideology: Liberalism
- Political position: Centre

Party flag

The Liberal Party (Spanish: Partido Liberal), commonly known as the Blue Party (Spanish: Partido Azul), was a political party in Paraguay from 1887 to 1993. The party ruled the country for most of the period between 1904 and 1940.

The party won the 1928 elections, the first fair and free elections in Paraguay history.

== History ==
The party was established in 1887 by Antonio Taboada to represent the interests of landowners and middle class merchants. The party advocated for mass suffrage.

The Colorado Party was established in the same year and was dominant until the Liberal Revolution in 1904, after which the Liberal Party remained in government for almost the entire period until 1940. The Gondrista faction (named after Manuel Gondra) of the party controlled government from 1921 to 1936.

The party was dissolved by Higinio Morinigo in 1942, and by the end of the 1947 revolution the Colorado Party was the only one left in the country. The Liberal Party continued to exist abroad and in 1963 the Renewal Group faction returned to the country to become the "official" opposition to the Stroessner regime. This caused a split in the party, with the remainder being renamed the Radical Liberal Party.

In the 1963 elections the party's candidate Ernesto Gavilan received 7.7% of the vote, whilst the party won 20 of the 60 seats in the Chamber of Deputies. In the Constitutional Assembly elections in 1967 the party won just eight of the 120 seats, finishing third behind the Colorado Party and the Radical Liberal Party. After this defeat the party was reduced to being the third party in the Stroessner regime. They won only three Chamber seats in the 1968 elections. It regained a seat in the 1973 elections, and remained at four seats after the 1978 elections. The 1983 elections saw the party win seven seats, which they retained in the 1988 elections.

After the Stroessner regime was overthrown, support for the party rapidly dwindled. In the 1989 elections the party received just 0.5% of the national vote and failed to win a seat. They failed to regain any seats in the 1993 elections, and did not contest any further elections.

== Electoral history ==
=== Presidential elections ===
Election date	Party candidate	Votes	%	Result
1963	Ernesto Gavilan	47,750	7.7%	Lost ✗
1968	Ruy Rufinelli	27,965	4.3%	Lost ✗
1973	Carlos Levi Rufinelli	24,611	3.1%	Lost ✗
1978	Fulvio Hugo Celauro	37,059	3.7%	Lost ✗
1983	Fulvio Hugo Celauro	34,010	3.3%	Lost ✗
1988	Carlos Ferreira Ybarra	42,430	3.2%	Lost ✗
1989	Carlos Ferreira Ibarra	4,423	0.38%	Lost ✗
1993	Abraham Zapag Bazas	881	0.08%	Lost ✗

=== Chamber of Deputies elections ===
Chamber of Deputies
Election	Votes	%	Seats	+/–
1960	Boycotted		0 / 60	Steady
1963	47,750	7.7%	20 / 60	▲20
1968	27,965	4.3%	3 / 60	▼17
1973	24,611	3.1%	4 / 60	▲1
1978	37,059	3.7%	4 / 60	Steady
1983	34,010	3.3%	7 / 60	▲3
1988	42,430	3.2%	7 / 60	Steady
1989	5,544	0.5%	0 / 72	▼7
1993	23,275	2.1%	0 / 80	Steady

=== Senate elections ===
Senate
Election	Votes	%	Seats	+/–
1968	Not released	Not released	1 / 30	▲1
1973	24,611	3.1%	2 / 30	▲1
1978	Not released	Not released	10 / 30	▲8
1983	Not released	Not released	4 / 30	▼6
1988	Not released	Not released	4 / 30	Steady
