= 1989 Paraguayan coup d'état =

Military overthrow of Alfredo Stroessner

- Part of the Cold War
Date	2–3 February 1989 (1 day)
Location	Asunción, Paraguay
Result	Coup successful: Stroessner is removed from power and sent into exile; Andrés Rodríguez becomes president

Belligerents
Government of Paraguay	(Paraguay) 1st Army Corps

Commanders and leaders
(Paraguay) Alfredo Stroessner	(Paraguay) Andrés Rodríguez

Political support
Stronist Colorados	Traditionalist Colorados

Casualties and losses
- estimated 31–300 soldiers killed in action

The 1989 Paraguayan coup d'état, also known as La Noche de la Candelaria, was a coup d'état that took place on 2–3 February 1989 in Asunción, Paraguay, led by General Andrés Rodríguez against the regime of long-time leader Alfredo Stroessner. The bloody overthrow which saw numerous soldiers killed in street fighting was sparked by a power struggle in the highest echelons of the government. Rodríguez's takeover spelled the end of El Stronato, Stroessner's 34 year long rule — at the time the longest in Latin America — and led to an array of reforms which abolished numerous draconian laws and led to the liberalization of Paraguay.

== Background ==
Alfredo Stroessner, a general and veteran of the Paraguayan Civil War and the Chaco War, came to power in the aftermath of the 1954 coup d'état. Soon after taking office, he declared a "state of siege" and instituted a number of laws and security reforms which gave him the power to suspend civil liberties, including habeas corpus and freedom of assembly. Congress renewed the state of siege every 90 days until 1987, apart from a brief period in 1959. On paper, Stroessner limited the scope of the state of siege to the area around Asunción in 1970. However, the courts held that anyone charged with security offenses could be tried in the capital under the state-of-siege provisions, regardless of where the offense took place. Apart from election day, Stroessner ruled under what amounted to martial law for almost his entire tenure. The United States was one of President Stroessner's most ardent supporters due to his fervent anti-communism; Paraguay was the recipient of large amounts of U.S. military assistance during the 1960s and 1970s. The state of siege imposed by Stroessner soon after assuming the presidency was officially lifted in 1987; however, this move was largely symbolic; its substance remained in place by way of draconian security laws.

Between 1958 and 1988, Stroessner was reelected seven times by questionably high margins of victory (only in the 1968 election did an opposition candidate receive more than 20% of the vote). Under these conditions, opposition was barely tolerated even when it was nominally legal. For instance, even after Stroessner nominally lifted the state of siege in 1987, opposition leaders and meetings were subject to the same heavy-handed repression that had become the norm in the country for over 30 years. The conduct of the 1988 elections was little different from past elections; only the Colorados were allowed to campaign unmolested.

In the late 1980s, political conflict broke out between two competing factions in the ruling Colorado Party. One faction, the "militants", vigorously supported Stroessner while the "traditionalists" sought a more open Paraguay and were less supportive of some of Stroessner's policies. Among the traditionalists was General Andrés Rodríguez, a close confidante of Stroessner and commander of Paraguay's 1st Army Corps. A strong contender for succeeding the aging president, the militant wing of the party attempted to neuter his political power by giving him the option of taking the position of defense minister, a largely ceremonial position, or retiring. Fearing a rebellion, Stroessner had already removed high-ranking, experienced military commanders from their postings and replaced them with his supporters.

== Coup ==
On the night of 2 February 1989, Rodríguez ordered units of his 1st Army Corps, including some 40 to 50 tanks, into the streets of Asunción. The unit, the strongest and most well-equipped of Paraguay's armed forces, seized the capital city's center. Troops from the unit attempted to arrest Stroessner as he dined at his mistress' home, however bodyguards resisted fiercely and allowed the president to escape to the headquarters of the Presidential Guards Regiment. A battle broke out between Rodríguez's troops and the 700-strong presidential guard. Meanwhile, the rest of Paraguay's military districts pledged their allegiance to the rebels.

Artillery units and naval vessels in the city's harbor shelled the headquarters during the course of the battle and by 5:00pm on 3 February, the government under Stroessner surrendered. Rodríguez announced the surrender over the radio and said Stroessner was in custody and unharmed. The official death toll of the coup stood at 31 killed however other estimates put the actual toll between 150 and 250, the majority of them Stroessner's guards. The Catholic Church station Radio Caritas said up to 200 people were killed in the fighting.

Stroessner was initially detained at the base of the 1st Army Corps but he was flown to exile aboard a LAP Boeing 707 to Brasília, Brazil on 6 February after being granted asylum. He left with his son, Gustavo, and daughter-in-law and lived in a lakeside home, previously his summer home, until his death in 2006.

For a relatively detailed description of the events leading up to the coup and the military and other activity during the coup as well as immediately afterwards, see Antonio Luis Sapienza's book, The 1989 Coup d'État in Paraguay: The End of a Long Dictatorship, 1954-1989 (Helion, 2019). Per Sapienza: Stroessner's son, PAF Colonel Gustavo Stroessner, calls his father sometime after 5 PM on February 2 to tell his father the coup would take place that day. Stroessner, who is playing cards at Colonel Duarte's house, doesn't believe him. At 7 PM Stroessner goes to his mistress Legal's house with his escort. Stroessner accepts there is to be a coup sometime before 8:30 PM, when he leaves for his son Freddy's house, leaving half his escort at Legal's house. Stroessner meets at Freddy's house by 9 PM with Gustavo joining them. They move to the Presidential Escort Barracks. Then to the adjacent Armed Forces HQ complex, concrete with a helicopter pad for possible aerial departure. The coup plotters now move up their 3 AM start on February 3, and the orders go out, with light tanks and other forces moving out at 9:15 PM. After the attack commences and there is a brief negotiation between the coup plotters and HQ, eventually the Stroessners and others in the HQ (including the Minister of Defense, the Army Chief of Staff, the Military Training School commander, the Presidential Escort Regiment commander, the Chief of Military Intelligence, two other generals and five colonels) start filing out one-by-one at 12:40 AM. As for the casualties:

"Although official reports showed few casualties - 31 fatalities (two civilians, a Cavalry officer, 21 REP privates, two police officers and five police NCOs) and 58 wounded military and police personnel - the estimated number was actually around 170 lives lost, mostly in the Presidential Escort Regiment." (p. 58)

== Aftermath ==
At the time, Paraguay did not have a vice president. In accordance with the constitution, Rodríguez was elected as provisional president by Congress and the Council of State. Rodríguez began his rule by reversing Stroessner's repressive measures, removing his loyalists from the military, and abolishing the death penalty. He also dissolved the legislature, removed the sweeping ban on political parties, and organized elections to take place in May 1989. In an effort to clean up the country's image, some of Stroessner's closest collaborators were tried for corruption, notably the "Cuatrinomio de Oro" group. Rodríguez was elected for the remainder of Stroessner's term in the 1989 elections, the closest thing to a free election the country had seen in its history. He served in that capacity until 1993, the first Paraguayan leader in decades to leave at the end of his first term. He died of cancer in 1997.

== See also ==
- 1989 Paraguayan general election
