= Liberal radicalism =

Liberal radicalism may refer to:

- Radicalism (historical), a variant of liberalism emerging in several European and Latin American countries in the 19th century, advocating universal suffrage and other democratic rights
- Social liberalism, a more left-leaning variant of European liberalism, culturally progressive and economically interventionist

== See also ==
- Radical Liberal Party (disambiguation)
