= 1928 Paraguayan presidential election =

- 18 April 1928
- Presidential election
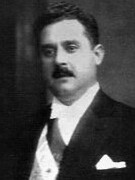

Candidate	José Patricio Guggiari	Eduardo Fleitas
Party	Liberal	Colorado
Popular vote	51,139	23,687
Percentage	68.34%	31.66%
President before election
Eligio Ayala
Liberal
Elected President
José Patricio Guggiari
Liberal

Presidential elections were held in Paraguay on 14 April 1928. José Patricio Guggiari of the Liberal Party won the elections. The Colorado Party candidate was Eduardo Fleitas.

The election is considered to have been the first free and fair presidential elections in Paraguayan history. Nonetheless, around 14,000 blank ballots were cast, according to The New York Times, as a protest against alleged election fraud.

== Results ==
Party	Presidential candidate	Votes	%
Liberal Party	José Patricio Guggiari	51,139	68.34
Colorado Party	Eduardo Fleitas	23,687	31.66
Total		74,826	100.00
Valid votes		74,826	84.20
Invalid/blank votes		14,043	15.80
Total votes		88,869	100.00
Source: The New York Times
