= 1989 Paraguayan general election =

- 1 May 1989
- Presidential election
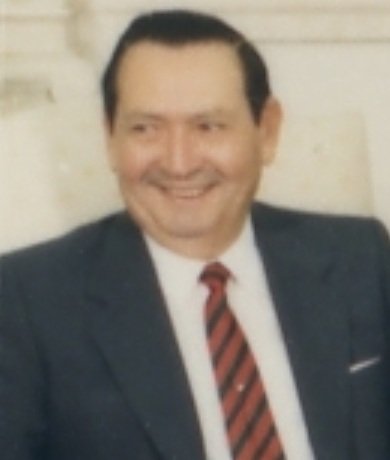

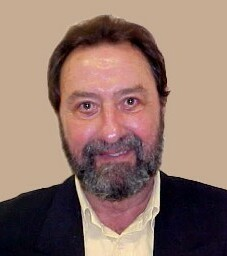
Candidate	Andrés Rodríguez	Domingo Laíno
Party	Colorado	PLRA
Popular vote	882,957	241,829
Percentage	76.59%	20.98%
- Results by department
President before election
Andrés Rodríguez
Colorado
President-elect
Andrés Rodríguez
Colorado
- Parliamentary election
- All 72 seats in the Chamber of Deputies; 37 seats needed for a majority
Party	Leader	Vote %	Seats	+/–
Colorado	Andrés Rodríguez	74.47	48	+8
PLRA	Domingo Laíno	20.19	21	New
PRF	Fernando Sánchez	2.10	2	New
Radical Liberal		1.32	1	−12
This lists parties that won seats. See the complete results below.

Early general elections were held in Paraguay on 1 May 1989 to elect the president and Chamber of Deputies. They were the first held since longtime president Alfredo Stroessner was toppled in a military coup on 3 February, seven months after being sworn in for an eighth term. For the first time in several years, the opposition was allowed to contest the elections more or less unmolested; the Communists were the only party that was banned from taking part.

Andrés Rodríguez, who had led the coup and had been serving as provisional president since then, was elected president in his own right running on the Colorado Party ticket. The Colorado Party also won 48 of the 72 seats in the Chamber of Deputies. Voter turnout was 52%.

The legislative elections were called after Rodríguez dissolved the previous Congress in February, citing a provision of the constitution that allowed the president to do so if they felt Congress had acted in a manner that distorted the separation of powers. Rodríguez used the new elections as a tool to purge pro-Stroessner "militants" from the Colorado caucus. The presidential elections were held because the constitution required new elections if a president died, resigned, or was permanently disabled less than two years into their term. That same provision stipulated that the winner would not serve a full five-year term, but only the remainder of the previous president's term. In this case, Rodríguez won the right to serve the remainder of Stroessner's term, which was due to end in 1993.

== Results ==
=== President ===
Candidate	Party	Votes	%
Andrés Rodríguez	Colorado Party	882,957	76.59
Domingo Laíno	Authentic Radical Liberal Party	241,829	20.98
Fernando Vera Sánchez	Revolutionary Febrerista Party	11,007	0.95
Secundino Núñez Medina	Christian Democratic Party	8,032	0.70
Carlos Ferreira Ibarra	Liberal Party	4,423	0.38
Blas Manuel Mangabeira	Unified Radical Liberal Party	3,545	0.31
Carlos Gustavo Callizo Parini	Paraguayan Humanist Party	1,058	0.09
Total		1,152,851	100.00
Valid votes		1,152,851	99.04
Invalid/blank votes		11,197	0.96
Total votes		1,164,048	100.00
Registered voters/turnout		2,226,061	52.29
Source: Justicia Electoral

=== Chamber of Deputies ===
Party	Votes	%	Seats	+/–
Colorado Party	845,820	74.47	48	+8
Authentic Radical Liberal Party	229,329	20.19	21	New
Revolutionary Febrerista Party	23,815	2.10	2	New
Radical Liberal Party	15,083	1.33	1	–12
Christian Democratic Party	11,674	1.03	0	New
Liberal Party	5,544	0.49	0	–7
Unified Radical Liberal Party	3,476	0.31	0	New
Paraguayan Humanist Party	1,069	0.09	0	New
Total	1,135,810	100.00	72	+12
Valid votes	1,135,810	98.10		
Invalid/blank votes	21,971	1.90		
Total votes	1,157,781	100.00		
Registered voters/turnout	2,226,061	52.01		
Source: Nohlen
