= Unified Radical Liberal Party =

The Unified Radical Liberal Party was a political party in Paraguay. It contested the 1989 general elections that followed the overthrow of Alfredo Stroessner, but received just 3,476 votes (0.3%) and failed to win a seat. The party did not contest any further elections.
