= Radical Liberal Party (Paraguay) =

1963–1989 political party in Paraguay

Radical Liberal Party Partido Liberal Radical
- Founded: 1963
- Dissolved: 1990
- Split from: Liberal Party
- Merged into: Authentic Radical Liberal Party
- Headquarters: Asunción
- Ideology: Liberalism

The Radical Liberal Party (Spanish: Partido Liberal Radical, PLR) was a political party in Paraguay. It was the largest legal opposition group during the Stroessner regime, but disappeared soon after he was overthrown.

== History ==
The party was established in 1963 after a split in the Liberal Party. After the Renovation Group faction of the Liberal Party returned to Paraguay to become the "official" opposition to the Stroessner regime, the remainder of the party was renamed the Radical Liberal Party. In 1967 members of the PLR also returned to Paraguay to participate in the Constitutional Assembly elections that year. They won 29 of the 120 seats, overtaking the Liberal Party to become the largest of the opposition groups.

In the 1968 general elections the party won nine of the 30 Senate seats and 16 of the 60 seats in the Chamber of Deputies. The 1973 elections saw the party lose one Senate seat, but retain all 16 in the Chamber. The party did not contest the 1977 Constitutional Assembly elections, and after the constitution was amended to allow Stroessner to remain in power indefinitely, a majority of members left the party to establish the Authentic Radical Liberal Party.

The party retained its 16 Chamber seats in the 1978 elections, but was reduced to 13 in 1983. After winning 13 seats again in the 1988 elections, the party saw a huge loss of support after Stroessner was overthrown. In the 1989 elections the party's vote share fell from 7.2% to 1.3% and won just a single seat. It did not contest any further elections.

== Election results ==
=== Presidential elections ===
Election	Candidate	Votes	%	Result
1968	Gustavo González	139,622	21.5%	Lost
1973	Gustavo Riart	98,096	12.2%	Lost
1978	Germán Acosta Caballero	54,984	5.5%	Lost
1983	Enzo Doldan	59,094	5.7%	Lost
1988	Luis María Vega	95,450	7.2%	Lost

=== Chamber of Deputies elections ===
Election	Votes	%	Seats	+/–
1968	465,535	71.6%	16 / 60	▲16
1973	98,096	12.2%	16 / 60	Steady
1978	54,984	5.5%	16 / 60	Steady
1983	59,094	5.7%	13 / 60	▼3
1988	95,450	7.2%	13 / 60	Steady
1989	15,083	1.3%	1 / 72	▼12

=== Senate elections ===
Election	Votes	%	Seats	+/–
1968	465,535	71.6%	9 / 30	▲9
1973	98,096	12.2%	8 / 30	▼1
1978	54,984	5.5%	10 / 30	▲2
1983	59,094	5.7%	6 / 30	▼4
1988	95,450	7.2%	6 / 30	Steady
