= Sendero =

Spanish newspaper distributor

- Type: Weekly newspaper
- Publisher: Paraguayan Episcopal Conference
- Founded: 1973
- Ceased publication: 1992
- Country: Paraguay

Sendero ('Path') was a Spanish-language newspaper in Paraguay, published by the Paraguayan Episcopal Conference (CEP). Initially it was a fortnightly and was later converted into a weekly newspaper.

== History ==
The first issue of Sendero was published in July 1973. The previous press organ of CEP, Comunidad had been shut down in 1969 after persistent repression and harassment from the Alfredo Stroessner government. During the period 1969–1973 the only organ of the Catholic Church had been an internal 'Information Bulletine' circulated within parishes but without possibility of distribution through news-kiosks. The (verbal) permission to publish Sendero was obtained after negotiations on behalf of CEP with the newly instituted Dirección General de Culto (an institution within the Ministry of Education) and the Minister of Interior Sabinoi Augusto Montanaro.

Sendero continued publication throughout the rest of the Stroessner years, but was constantly under the watchful eyes the Ministry of Education and the Dirección General de Culto. For example, in 1974 a series of articles were censored for having been 'unnecessarily unfriendly towards the government of General Stroessner'. In particular, a Guarani language column titled Ñande kuéra kuete irritated the state authorities. The column, authored by José Leon (a pseudonym), repeatedly commented on cases of political repression in the country. The newspaper also carried a section titled Derechos Humanos ('Human Rights').

Publication of Sendero ended in 1992 after a decision by the Bishops' Assembly.

== See also ==
- Roman Catholicism in Paraguay
