= 1977 Paraguayan Constitutional Assembly election =

- 6 February 1977
- 120 seats in the Constitutional Assembly; 61 seats needed for a majority
Party	Leader	Vote %	Seats
Colorado	Alfredo Stroessner	100	
This lists parties that won seats. See the complete results below.

Constitutional Assembly elections were held in Paraguay on 6 February 1977. The Colorado Party was the only party to contest the elections amidst an opposition boycott, and won all seats. Voter turnout was 82.8%. Following the election, the constitution was amended to scrap term limits, allowing President Alfredo Stroessner to contest the 1978 elections.

== Results ==
Party	Votes	%
Colorado Party	687,065	100.00
Total	687,065	100.00
Valid votes	687,065	84.00
Invalid/blank votes	130,870	16.00
Total votes	817,935	100.00
Registered voters/turnout	987,917	82.79
Source: Nohlen
