= 1960 Paraguayan parliamentary election =

Parliamentary elections were held in Paraguay in 1960 after President Alfredo Stroessner had dissolved Congress. The elections were boycotted by the opposition in protest at insufficient guarantees of freedom. Subsequently all 60 seats were won by the Colorado Party.

== Results ==
Party	Votes	%	Seats
Colorado Party			60
Total			60
Total votes	271,452	–	
Source: Nohlen, Countries Quest
