= 1973 Paraguayan general election =

← 1968	11 February 1973	1977 →
- Turnout: 77.39%
- Presidential election
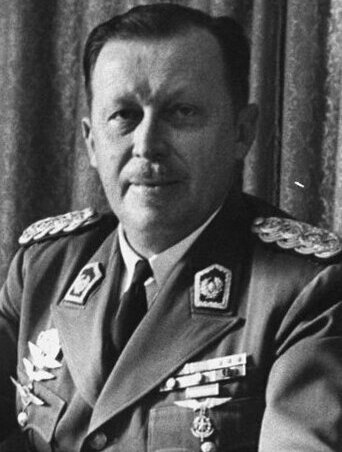

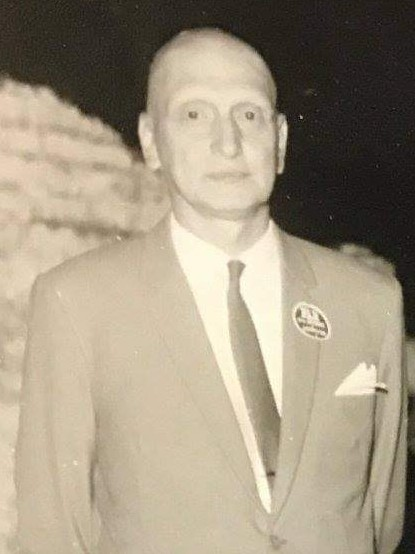
Candidate	Alfredo Stroessner	Gustavo Riart
Party	Colorado	Radical Liberal
Popular vote	681,306	98,096
Percentage	84.74%	12.20%
President before election
Alfredo Stroessner
Colorado
President-elect
Alfredo Stroessner
Colorado
- Chamber of Deputies election
- All 60 seats in the Chamber of Deputies; 31 seats needed for a majority
Party	Leader	Vote %	Seats	+/–
Colorado	Alfredo Stroessner	84.74	40	0
Radical Liberal	Gustavo Riart	12.20	16	0
Liberal	Ruy Rufinelli	3.06	4	+1
This lists parties that won seats. See the complete results below.
- Senate election
- All 30 seats in the Senate; 16 seats needed for a majority
Party	Vote %	Seats	+/–
Colorado	84.74	20	0
Radical Liberal	12.20	8	−1
Liberal	3.06	2	+1
This lists parties that won seats. See the complete results below.

General elections were held in Paraguay on 11 February 1973. Alfredo Stroessner of the Colorado Party won the presidential elections, whilst the Colorado Party won 20 of the 30 seats in the Senate and 40 of the 60 seats in the Chamber of Deputies. Voter turnout was 77%.

== Results ==
Party	Presidential candidate	Votes	%	Seats			
Party	Presidential candidate	Votes	%	Chamber	+/–	Senate	+/–
Colorado Party	Alfredo Stroessner	681,306	84.74	40	0	20	0
Radical Liberal Party	Gustavo Riart	98,096	12.20	16	0	8	–1
Liberal Party	Carlos Levi Rufinelli	24,611	3.06	4	+1	2	+1
Total		804,013	100.00	60	0	30	0
Valid votes		804,013	98.70				
Invalid/blank votes		10,597	1.30				
Total votes		814,610	100.00				
Registered voters/turnout		1,052,652	77.39				
Source: Nohlen, IPU
