= 1983 Paraguayan general election =

← 1978	6 February 1983	1988 →
- Turnout: 92.62%
- Presidential election
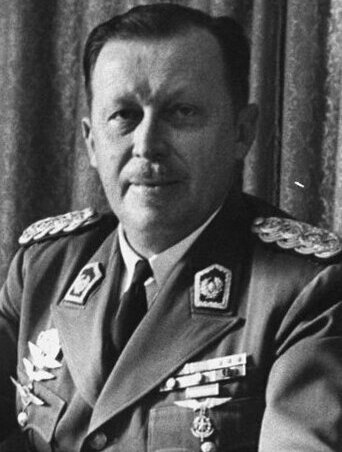

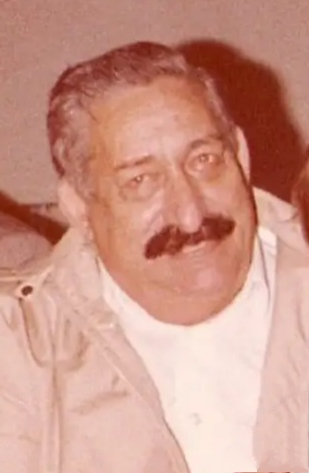
Candidate	Alfredo Stroessner	Enzo Doldan
Party	Colorado	Radical Liberal
Popular vote	944,637	59,094
Percentage	91.03%	5.69%
President before election
Alfredo Stroessner
Colorado
Elected President
Alfredo Stroessner
Colorado
- Chamber of Deputies election
- All 60 seats in the Chamber of Deputies; 31 seats needed for a majority
Party	Leader	Vote %	Seats	+/–
Colorado	Alfredo Stroessner	91.03	40	0
Radical Liberal	Enzo Doldan	5.69	13	+1
Liberal	Fulvio Celauro	3.28	7	−1
This lists parties that won seats. See the complete results below.
- Senate election
- All 30 seats in the Senate; 16 seats needed for a majority
Party	Vote %	Seats	+/–
Colorado	91.03	20	0
Radical Liberal	5.69	6	0
Liberal	3.28	4	0
This lists parties that won seats. See the complete results below.

General elections were held in Paraguay on 6 February 1983. Alfredo Stroessner of the Colorado Party won the presidential elections, whilst the Colorado Party won 20 of the 30 seats in the Senate and 40 of the 60 seats in the Chamber of Deputues. Voter turnout was 93%.

== Results ==
Party	Presidential candidate	Votes	%	Seats			
Party	Presidential candidate	Votes	%	Chamber	+/–	Senate	+/–
Colorado Party	Alfredo Stroessner	944,637	91.03	40	0	20	0
Radical Liberal Party	Enzo Doldan	59,094	5.69	13	+1	6	0
Liberal Party	Fulvio Hugo Celauro	34,010	3.28	7	–1	4	0
Total		1,037,741	100.00	60	0	30	0
Valid votes		1,037,741	98.93				
Invalid/blank votes		11,255	1.07				
Total votes		1,048,996	100.00				
Registered voters/turnout		1,132,582	92.62				
Source: Nohlen, The Europa World Year Book 1985
