= 1967 Paraguayan Constitutional Assembly election =

- 7 May 1967
- 120 seats in the Constitutional Assembly; 61 seats needed for a majority
| Party | Leader | Vote % | Seats |
|---|---|---|---|
| Colorado | | 69.4 | 80 |
| Radical Liberal | | 21.5 | 29 |
| Liberal | | 6.2 | 8 |
| PRF | | 2.8 | 3 |
This lists parties that won seats. See the complete results below.

Constitutional Assembly elections were held in Paraguay on 7 May 1967. The Colorado Party won 80 of the 120 seats. Voter turnout was 68.9%. Following the election, the country's fifth constitution was promulgated in August.

== Results ==
| Party | Votes | % | Seats |
|---|---|---|---|
| Colorado Party | 315,941 | 69.44 | 80 |
| Radical Liberal Party | 97,838 | 21.50 | 29 |
| Liberal Party | 28,321 | 6.22 | 8 |
| Revolutionary Febrerista Party | 12,911 | 2.84 | 3 |
| Total | 455,011 | 100.00 | 120 |
| Valid votes | 455,011 | 98.52 | |
| Invalid/blank votes | 6,828 | 1.48 | |
| Total votes | 461,839 | 100.00 | |
| Registered voters/turnout | 670,010 | 68.93 | |
Source: Nohlen

== Constitutional amendments ==
The new constitution drafted by the Assembly replaced the constitution of 1940. It limited the president to two five-year terms, but a transitory article stated that only those terms completed after the 1968 election would count toward the two-term limit. This had the effect of allowing President Alfredo Stroessner, in office since 1954, to run for two more terms in office. The new document also returned the governing system to a bicameral legislature, including an elected Senate. It provided for the addition of a Supreme Court and reduced the voting age to eighteen. Greater safeguards to human rights were introduced, granting habeas corpus, individual freedom, freedom of association and movement, and protections from mistreatment or torture. The exercise of dictatorial powers was forbidden, and all officials were required to act in accordance with the constitution. It also allowed for political opposition to re-emerge, which prompted several former political leaders to return from exile.

The new constitution maintained the authoritarian character of its predecessor. While it banned the use of dictatorial powers, it also vested the president with many of the sweeping executive and legislative powers they had held in the 1940 constitution. Congress was prevented from carrying out autonomous actions, while the judiciary was dependent upon presidential appointment. The president retained the ability to dissolve Congress if they felt it had acted in a manner that disturbed the separation of powers. The president also retained the power to declare a state of siege, which allowed them to suspend constitutional freedoms for up to 90 days in all or part of the country. Within five days of declaring the state of siege, the president was required to notify Congress of the reasons for doing so, the rights being suspended, and the portion(s) of the country where it applied. Stroessner had declared a state of siege soon after taking office, and had it renewed every 90 days until 1987. While the state of siege technically only applied to Asunción after 1970, the courts ruled that anyone charged with security offenses could be brought to the capital and charged under the state-of-siege provisions, even if the offense took place outside the capital. Having already ruled under what amounted to martial law for most of his first thirteen years in office (apart from a 24-hour period on election day) Stroessner continued doing so even after the new constitution was promulgated, effectively nullifying constitutional guarantees of civil rights.
