= Capital punishment in Paraguay =

Capital punishment has been abolished in Paraguay. It was abolished in the year 1992 by the constitution. The last execution was carried out in Paraguay in 1928.

Paraguay voted in favor of the United Nations moratorium on the death penalty eight consecutive times: in 2007, 2008, 2010, 2012, 2014, 2016, 2018, and 2020. It also acceded to the Second Optional Protocol to the International Covenant on Civil and Political Rights on 18 August 2003.
