= 1978 Paraguayan general election =

← 1973	12 February 1978	1983 →
- Turnout: 85.96%
- Presidential election
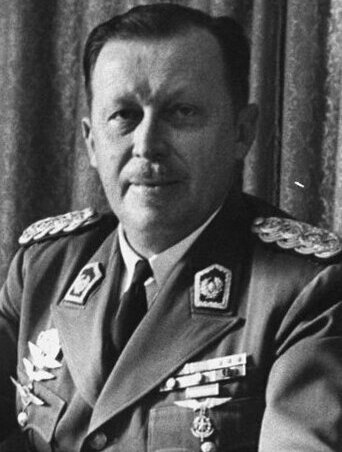

Candidate	Alfredo Stroessner	Germán Acosta Caballero
Party	Colorado	Radical Liberal
Popular vote	905,461	54,984
Percentage	90.77%	5.51%
President before election
Alfredo Stroessner
Colorado
President-elect
Alfredo Stroessner
Colorado
- Parliamentary election
- 60 seats in the Chamber of Deputies; 30 seats in the Senate
Party	Leader	Vote %	Seats	+/–
Chamber of Deputies (31 seats for a majority)
Colorado	Alfredo Stroessner	90.77	40	0
Radical Liberal	Germán Acosta Caballero	5.51	12	−4
Liberal	Fulvio Celauro	3.72	8	+4
Senate (16 seats needed for a majority)
Colorado		90.77	20	0
Radical Liberal		5.51	6	−2
Liberal		3.72	4	+2
This lists parties that won seats. See the complete results below.

General elections were held in Paraguay on 12 February 1978. Alfredo Stroessner of the Colorado Party won the presidential elections, whilst the Colorado Party won 20 of the 30 seats in the Senate and 40 of the 60 seats in the Chamber of Deputies. Voter turnout was 86%.

== Results ==
Party	Presidential candidate	Votes	%	Seats			
Party	Presidential candidate	Votes	%	Chamber	+/–	Senate	+/–
Colorado Party	Alfredo Stroessner	905,461	90.77	40	0	20	0
Radical Liberal Party	Germán Acosta Caballero	54,984	5.51	12	–4	6	–2
Liberal Party	Fulvio Hugo Celauro	37,059	3.72	8	+4	4	+2
Total		997,504	100.00	60	0	30	0
Valid votes		997,504	98.73				
Invalid/blank votes		12,795	1.27				
Total votes		1,010,299	100.00				
Registered voters/turnout		1,175,351	85.96				
Source: Nohlen, Banks
