= 1968 Paraguayan general election =

← 1967	11 February 1968	1973 →
- Turnout: 73.14%
- Presidential election
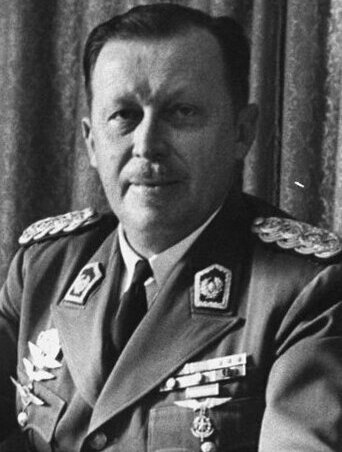

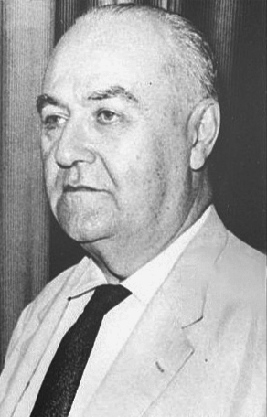
Candidate	Alfredo Stroessner	Gustavo González
Party	Colorado	Radical Liberal
Popular vote	465,535	139,622
Percentage	71.62%	21.48%
President before election
Alfredo Stroessner
Colorado
Elected President
Alfredo Stroessner
Colorado
- Chamber of Deputies election
- All 60 seats in the Chamber of Deputies; 31 seats needed for a majority
Party	Leader	Vote %	Seats	+/–
Colorado	Alfredo Stroessner	71.62	40	0
Radical Liberal	Gustavo González	21.48	16	New
Liberal	Ruy Rufinelli	4.30	3	−17
PRF	Carlos Gatti	2.60	1	New
This lists parties that won seats. See the complete results below.
- Senate election
- All 30 seats in the Senate; 16 seats needed for a majority
Party	Vote %	Seats	+/–
Colorado	71.62	20	New
Radical Liberal	21.48	9	New
Liberal	4.30	1	New
This lists parties that won seats. See the complete results below.

General elections were held in Paraguay on 11 February 1968. Alfredo Stroessner of the Colorado Party won the presidential elections, whilst the Colorado Party won 20 of the 30 seats in the Senate and 40 of the 60 seats in the Chamber of Deputies. Voter turnout was 73%.

This would be the lowest vote share Stroessner would claim in the six elections in which he nominally faced an opponent; on the other occasions, he claimed to win by margins of well over 80 percent. It would also be the only time in Stroessner's 35-year tenure that an opposition candidate would manage even 20 percent of the vote.

== Results ==
Party	Presidential candidate	Votes	%	Seats		
Party	Presidential candidate	Votes	%	Chamber	+/–	Senate
Colorado Party	Alfredo Stroessner	465,535	71.62	40	0	20
Radical Liberal Party	Gustavo González	139,622	21.48	16	New	9
Liberal Party	Ruy Rufinelli	27,965	4.30	3	–17	1
Revolutionary Febrerista Party	Carlos Caballero Gatti	16,871	2.60	1	New	0
Total		649,993	100.00	60	0	30
Valid votes		649,993	99.02			
Invalid/blank votes		6,421	0.98			
Total votes		656,414	100.00			
Registered voters/turnout		897,445	73.14			
Source: Nohlen, Lewis, IPU
