= 1963 Paraguayan general election =

- 10 February 1963
- Turnout: 85.12%
- Presidential election
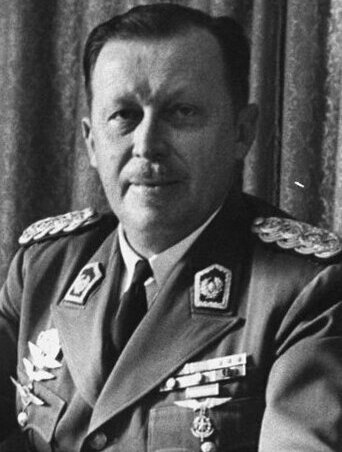

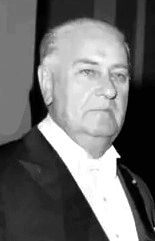
Candidate	Alfredo Stroessner	Ernesto Gavilan
Party	Colorado	Liberal
Popular vote	569,551	47,750
Percentage	92.26%	7.74%
President before election
Alfredo Stroessner
Colorado
Elected President
Alfredo Stroessner
Colorado
- Parliamentary election
- 60 seats in the Chamber of Deputies; 31 seats needed for a majority
Party	Leader	Vote %	Seats	+/–
Colorado	Alfredo Stroessner	92.26	40	−20
Liberal	Ernesto Gavilan	7.74	20	New
This lists parties that won seats. See the complete results below.

General elections were held in Paraguay on 10 February 1963. Opposition parties had been legalized just a year earlier, after a 15-year period in which the Colorado Party was the only legally permitted party. They were the first elections in which opposition parties were allowed to take part since 1939.

Incumbent president Alfredo Stroessner of the Colorado Party was re-elected for a fourth term, whilst the Colorado Party won 40 of the 60 seats in the Chamber of Deputies. Voter turnout was 85.1%.

== Results ==
Party	Presidential candidate	Votes	%	Seats	+/–
Colorado Party	Alfredo Stroessner	569,551	92.26	40	–20
Liberal Party	Ernesto Gavilan	47,750	7.74	20	New
Total		617,301	100.00	60	0
Valid votes		617,301	98.20		
Invalid/blank votes		11,314	1.80		
Total votes		628,615	100.00		
Registered voters/turnout		738,472	85.12		
Source: Nohlen
