= 1988 Paraguayan general election =

← 1983	14 February 1988	1989 →
- Turnout: 92.17%
- Presidential election
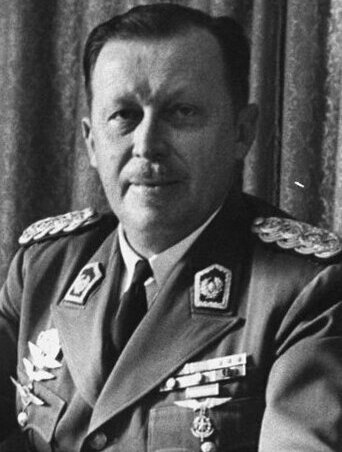

Candidate	Alfredo Stroessner	Luis María Vega
Party	Colorado	Radical Liberal
Popular vote	1,187,738	95,450
Percentage	89.60%	7.20%
President before election
Alfredo Stroessner
Colorado
President-elect
Alfredo Stroessner
Colorado
- Chamber of Deputies election
- All 60 seats in the Chamber of Deputies; 31 seats needed for a majority
Party	Leader	Vote %	Seats	+/–
Colorado	Alfredo Stroessner	89.60	40	0
Radical Liberal	Luis María Vega	7.20	13	0
Liberal	Carlos Ybarra	3.20	7	0
This lists parties that won seats. See the complete results below.
- Senate election
- All 30 seats in the Senate; 16 seats needed for a majority
Party	Vote %	Seats	+/–
Colorado	89.60	20	0
Radical Liberal	7.20	6	0
Liberal	3.20	4	0
This lists parties that won seats. See the complete results below.

General elections were held in Paraguay on 14 February 1988. Alfredo Stroessner of the Colorado Party won the presidential elections, whilst the Colorado Party won 20 of the 30 seats in the Senate and 40 of the 60 seats in the Chamber of Deputies. Voter turnout was 92%.

These were the first elections held since Stroessner nominally lifted a state of siege in 1987. The state of siege had been in force since he took office in 1954. Despite this, the elections took place in an atmosphere that was little different from past elections during Stroessner's 34-year rule. Opposition leaders were arbitrarily arrested, and opposition meetings and demonstrations were broken up—often brutally. The Colorados were the only party allowed to campaign unhindered. By election day, the only independent media outlets that had not been shut down were those operated by the Catholic Church. Under these conditions, most opposition parties urged their supporters to either cast blank ballots or abstain from voting altogether.

As it turned out, these were the last elections under Stroessner, who had won every election since 1954 with more than 70% of the vote. In February 1989, seven months after being sworn in for his eighth term, he was overthrown in a military coup. Fresh elections were held in May 1989, the first time the opposition had been able to contest elections more or less unmolested for over thirty years.

== Results ==
Party	Presidential candidate	Votes	%	Seats			
Party	Presidential candidate	Votes	%	Chamber	+/–	Senate	+/–
Colorado Party	Alfredo Stroessner	1,187,738	89.60	40	0	20	0
Radical Liberal Party	Luis María Vega	95,450	7.20	13	0	6	0
Liberal Party	Carlos Ferreira Ybarra	42,430	3.20	7	0	4	0
Total		1,325,618	100.00	60	0	30	0
Valid votes		1,325,618	99.41				
Invalid/blank votes		7,818	0.59				
Total votes		1,333,436	100.00				
Registered voters/turnout		1,446,675	92.17				
Source: Nohlen, IPU
