= Andrés Rodríguez (politician) =

President of Paraguay from 1989 to 1993

Lieutenant General Andrés Rodríguez
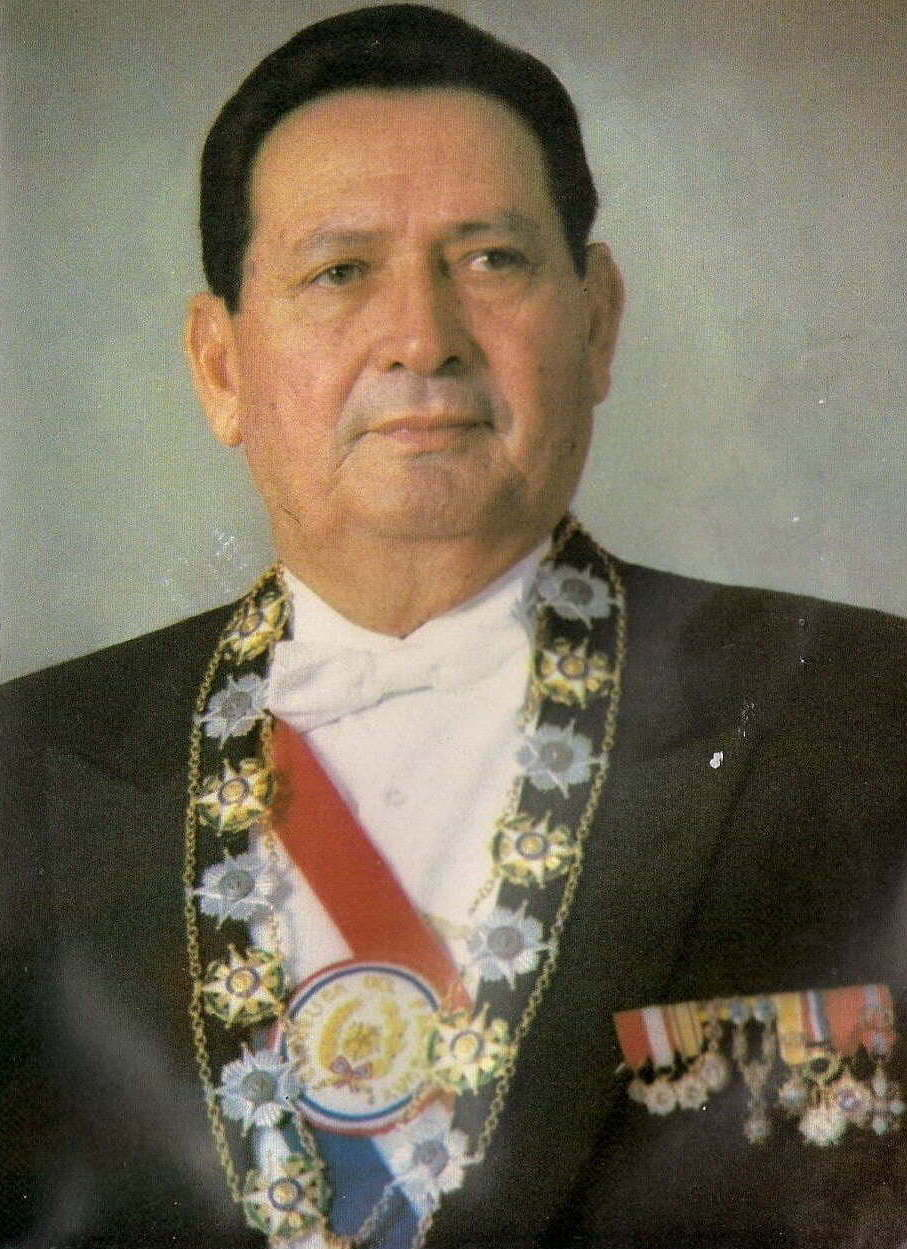
- Official portrait, 1989

43rd President of Paraguay
- In office February 3, 1989 – August 15, 1993; Provisional to May 15, 1989
- Preceded by: Alfredo Stroessner
- Succeeded by: Juan Carlos Wasmosy

Personal details
- Born: Andrés Rodríguez Pedotti; June 19, 1923 Borja, Guairá, Paraguay
- Died: April 21, 1997 (aged 73) New York City, U.S.
- Party: Colorado
- Spouse: Nelly Reig Castellanos (m. 1949)
- Children: 3

Military service
- Allegiance: Paraguay
- Branch/service: Paraguayan Army
- Years of service: 1946–1992
- Rank: Lieutenant General (1970–1992)

Andrés Rodríguez Pedotti (June 19, 1923 – April 21, 1997) was a military officer and politician, being President of Paraguay from February 3, 1989, to August 15, 1993. He led the coup d'état on February 2 and 3, 1989, against the dictator Alfredo Stroessner Matiauda.

== 1989 coup d'état ==
Rodríguez had been Alfredo Stroessner's closest confidant for 35 years. The two became so close that Rodríguez's daughter married Stroessner's elder son. Under Stroessner's rule, Rodríguez became one of the richest men in Paraguay. Despite only earning the equivalent of $500 per month, he owned the nation's largest brewery, a chain of currency exchanges, an import-export company, a copper wire company, and several ranches.

However, relations between the two grew increasingly strained in the late 1980s. As the decade wore on, Rodríguez cultivated ties with the "traditionalists" in the long-dominant Colorado Party. This element of the party had supported Stroessner throughout his three-decade rule, but had come to favor a more humane way of governing. Matters came to a head in January 1989, when Stroessner relieved several generals of their commands and replaced them with men thought to be unquestionably loyal to him. Later that month, in what was viewed as a direct strike at Rodríguez, Stroessner closed all of the country's currency exchanges. On February 2, Stroessner summoned his former ally and gave him an ultimatum—either accept appointment as defense minister (which would have effectively been a demotion) or retire. It was reported that Rodríguez avoided the reunion (and attempted to quell rumors of him planning a coup) by faking a leg injury, going as far as having a fake cast put on one of his legs. As this story went, Stroessner's own son called his father to warn about a possible coup, but the dictator scoffed at them.

Later that night, Rodríguez finally gave his answer when he launched a violent coup. Troops and tanks from Rodríguez' 1st Army Corps surrounded the headquarters of the Presidential Guard in Asunción (where Stroessner had sought refuge). The coup had the backing of much of the Roman Catholic Church and of the United States, who no longer required Stroessner as an ally in the Cold War. Within hours, all of the country's military districts defected to the rebels. With this support, the coup quickly succeeded, with Stroessner resigning only 17 hours after hostilities began. However, some 500 soldiers on both sides are believed to have died as a consequence of Stroessner's capture. He was released and fled into exile a few days later, eventually taking refuge in Brazil.

A couple of weeks following the coup, former interior minister Edgar Ynsfrán told reporters that Rodríguez had begun planning the coup toward the end of December 1988. Ynsfrán had served as interior minister during the most repressive phase of the Stronato, but had switched to supporting Rodríguez and now favored a more humane approach to governance.

== Presidency ==
At the time, Paraguay did not have a vice president. Per the Constitution, if a president died, resigned, or became permanently disabled, a provisional president was to be chosen by Congress and the Council of State within 24 hours. Accordingly, Congress and the Council of State met soon after the coup and designated Rodríguez as provisional president.

Upon taking office, Rodríguez canceled most of Stroessner's most repressive measures, which came as a surprise given his previous closeness to Stroessner. He abolished the death penalty, freed political prisoners, and tried to imprison some leading members of the Stroessner government. He formally canceled the state of siege that had been in place for virtually all of Stroessner's rule; while it had nominally been repealed in 1987, its substance had remained in place in the form of draconian security laws and close restrictions on press freedom (opposition leaders had been arrested, and the Colorados had been the only party that had been allowed to campaign unmolested in the 1988 elections). He also welcomed back several longtime exiles.

Over the course of the following week, the military was purged of Stroessner's loyalists, and the commanders of the six rebellious army divisions were promoted to replace them.

As provisional president, Rodríguez dissolved the Chamber of Deputies on February 9 under a provision in the 1967 constitution that allowed the president to dissolve the legislature if he felt it had acted in a manner that distorted the constitutional separation of powers. He issued a decree setting new elections in May, and announced that all non-Communist parties would be allowed to compete. He intended to use this as a tool to purge the militants. This was a remarkable turn in a country where the opposition had been barely tolerated for much of its history, particularly during Stroessner's rule. Indeed, at the time of the coup, the country had only known two years of pluralism in its entire history. A presidential election for the balance of Stroessner's term was also on the same day as the congressional elections. The constitution required new elections within 90 days of a president resigning less than two years into his term, with the winner serving the unexpired portion of the term. Rodríguez ran as the Colorado candidate and was elected with 76 percent of the vote in what was the closest thing the country had seen to a free and fair election up to that time.

Soon after the ouster of Stroessner, the Rodríguez government was contacted by representatives of the People's Republic of China, inviting Paraguay to end its long-standing diplomatic relations with the Republic of China (Taiwan) and to recognize PRC instead. However, Rodríguez accepted the arguments of the Taiwanese ambassador Wang Sheng that continuing the relationship with ROC, and thus keeping Taiwan's development assistance and access to Taiwan's markets, would be more advantageous for Paraguay.

== End of rule and death ==
In 1991, elections were held for a Constitutional Assembly that would replace the country's authoritarian 1967 charter. The assembly wrote a new constitution that took effect on June 20, 1992. It limited the president to a single five-year term, with no possibility of reelection. The ban on reelection retroactively applied to Rodríguez, even though he had promised that he would not run for a full term. Specifically, no one who had been president even for a partial term was allowed to run or serve again. Rodríguez called this provision evidence of a lack of confidence in his word, and boycotted the inauguration ceremony. Fears of a coup were only allayed when he signed the new constitution into law on June 22. He stepped down as president on August 15, 1993, the first Paraguayan president in decades to leave office at the end of his term. He was succeeded by Juan Carlos Wasmosy, who like Rodríguez was a member of the Colorado Party.

Rodríguez died in New York City in 1997 after a long battle with cancer.

Political offices
Preceded by Alfredo Stroessner	President of Paraguay; 1989–1992	Succeeded by Juan Carlos Wasmosy
