= 1958 Paraguayan general election =

Re-election of President Alfredo Stroessner

- 9 February 1958
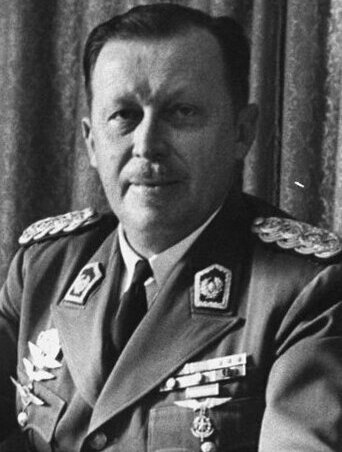
Candidate	Alfredo Stroessner
Party	Colorado
Popular vote	295,414
Percentage	100%
President before election
Alfredo Stroessner
Colorado
President-elect
Alfredo Stroessner
Colorado
- Parliamentary election
- 60 seats in the Chamber of Deputies
Party	Leader	Vote %	Seats	+/–
Colorado	Alfredo Stroessner	100.0	60	+7
This lists parties that won seats. See the complete results below.

General elections were held in Paraguay on 9 February 1958. At the time, the Colorado Party was the only legally permitted party. As such, incumbent president Alfredo Stroessner was unopposed for a full term; he had been in office since 1954 by virtue of winning a special election for the remainder of Federico Chávez' second term.

== Results ==
Candidate	Party	Votes	%
Alfredo Stroessner	Colorado Party	295,414	100.00
Total		295,414	100.00
Valid votes		295,414	97.34
Invalid/blank votes		8,064	2.66
Total votes		303,478	100.00
Source: Nohlen
