= Colorado Party (Paraguay) =

Political party in Paraguay

National Republican Association – Colorado Party Asociación Nacional Republicana – Partido Colorado
- Abbreviation: ANR-PC
- Leader: Pedro Alliana
- President: Horacio Cartes
- Founder: Bernardino Caballero
- Founded: 11 September 1887; 139 years ago
- Headquarters: 25 de Mayo N° 842 c/ Tacuary - Asunción
- Membership (2022): 2,616,424
- Ideology: Conservatism; Paraguayan nationalism Economic liberalism Factions: Cartismo
- Political position: Right-wing
- Regional affiliation: Union of Latin American Parties
- International affiliation: International Democracy Union
- Colours: Red, white
- Chamber of Deputies: 48 / 80
- Senate: 23 / 45
- Mercosur Parliament (Paraguay seats): 11 / 18
- Governors: 15 / 17

Party flag

Website
- www.anr.org.py
- Politics of Paraguay; Political parties; Elections; A: Various factions within the party vary from centre-right to far-right positions.

The National Republican Association (Spanish: Asociación Nacional Republicana, ANR), also known as the Colorado Party (Spanish: Partido Colorado, lit. 'Red Party'), is a conservative political party in Paraguay, founded on 11 September 1887 by Bernardino Caballero. Since 1947, the colorados, as they are known, have been dominant in Paraguayan politics (ruling as the only legal party between 1947 and 1962) and have controlled the presidency since 1948 – notwithstanding a brief interruption between 2008 and 2013 – as well as having a majority in both chambers of Congress and department governorships. It is one of the two traditionally largest parties in the country, along with the Authentic Radical Liberal Party (PLRA).

The Colorado Party has historically been and continues to be the dominant political party in Paraguay. With 2.6 million members as of 2022 (although there are allegations of numerous false affiliations made by the party), it is the largest political party in the country, usually ruling without the necessity of electoral alliances. Paraguay was for several decades under dictatorial rule by Alfredo Stroessner, a member of the Colorado Party, until he was ousted from power in 1989, which set off a democratization process. Since then, there has been an expansion of civil and political liberties, as well as elections at presidential, congressional, and municipal levels. However, the democratization process has been limited due to the firm control of the Colorado Party on the Paraguayan state. The Colorado Party retains power through clientelistic practices.

== History ==
=== 1887–1989 ===
The party, though founded only in 1887 as an answer to the foundation of the Liberal Party in that same year, already informally existed from the late 1870s onward, as a political group centered around Bernardino Caballero, Cándido Bareiro and José Segundo Decoud.

It formally ruled the country from its foundation until 1904, when it was overthrown in the Revolution of 1904. It became the dominant political force in the country when it rejoined the government in 1947, following the conclusion of the 1947 civil war, during Higinio Moríñigo's rule as president. During this time, the party operated multiple paramilitary wings. From 1947 until 1962, the Colorado Party ruled Paraguay as a one-party state; all other political parties were illegal. In 1962, all national parties were nominally legalized; the Communist Party being deemed "international" remained illegal and its adherents repressed by the Paraguayan state. In practice, however, Paraguay remained a one-party military dictatorship, with the Colorado Party serving as one of the "twin pillars" of Alfredo Stroessner's rule, who had assumed the presidency following a coup in 1954 and lasted until 1989, one of the longest in history by a non-royal leader. During Stroessner's rule, all members of the armed forces and government employees were required to be members of the Colorado Party. Dissident groups within the party were purged, and two (Movimiento Popular Colorado and Asociación Nacional Republicana en el Exilio y la Resistencia) acted as opposition groups in exile until the 1980s. In 1987, there was a rift in the party between a hardliner faction supportive of Stroessner's rule and a traditionalist faction. This rift was primarily over the issue of Stroessner's succession and was a large contributor to the 1989 coup d'état led by General Andrés Rodríguez, himself a traditionalist, which ousted Stroessner from power.

=== Since 1989 ===
In 2002, the National Union of Ethical Citizens split from the party.

During the 2003 Paraguayan general election, at the legislative elections the party won 35.3% of the popular vote (37 out of 80 seats) in the Chamber of Deputies of Paraguay and 32.9% (16 out of 45 seats) in the Senate. Its candidate at the presidential elections on the same date, Nicanor Duarte, was elected with 37.1% of the popular vote.

On 20 April 2008, for the first time in 61 years, the Colorado Party lost the presidential elections to an opposition candidate from the centre-left, Fernando Lugo, a Roman Catholic bishop, a first on both accounts (free election of an opposition candidate and of a bishop to the office of president in Paraguay). The Colorado Party was represented in these elections by Blanca Ovelar, the first woman to run for the presidency. Fernando Lugo, who had renounced the cloth before the elections so that he could become eligible under Paraguayan law, was formally released from his vows by the Vatican before his inauguration as president on 15 August 2008.

According to Antonio Soljancic, a social scientist at the Autonomous University of Asunción, "in order to get a job, you have to show you are a party member. The problem Paraguay has is that, although Stroessner disappeared from the political map, he left a legacy that no one has tried to bury".

The party has notably promoted Paraguay's close relationship with Taiwan, promising to retain Paraguay's status as the only Latin American country to recognize the Republic of China as the sole legitimate government of China.

== Electoral history ==
=== Presidential elections ===
Note: From 1947 until 1962, the Colorado Party was the sole legal party. Free and fair elections did not take place until 1993.

Election	Party candidate	Votes	%	Result
1928	Eduardo Fleitas	23,687	31.66%	Lost ✗
1948	Juan Natalicio González	56,085	100%	Elected (sole legal party) ✓
1949	Felipe Molas López		100%	Elected (sole legal party) ✓
1950	Federico Chávez		100%	Elected (sole legal party) ✓
1953	Federico Chávez	224,788	100%	Elected (sole legal party) ✓
1954	Alfredo Stroessner	236,191	100%	Elected (sole legal party) ✓
1958	Alfredo Stroessner	295,414	100%	Elected (sole legal party) ✓
1963	Alfredo Stroessner	569,551	92.26%	Elected ✓
1968	Alfredo Stroessner	465,535	71.62%	Elected ✓
1973	Alfredo Stroessner	681,306	84.74%	Elected ✓
1978	Alfredo Stroessner	905,461	90.77%	Elected ✓
1983	Alfredo Stroessner	944,637	91.03%	Elected ✓
1988	Alfredo Stroessner	1,187,738	89.60%	Elected ✓
1989	Andrés Rodríguez	882,957	76.59%	Elected ✓
1993	Juan Carlos Wasmosy	449,505	41.78%	Elected ✓
1998	Raúl Cubas Grau	887,196	55.35%	Elected ✓
2003	Nicanor Duarte	574,232	38.30%	Elected ✓
2008	Blanca Ovelar	573,995	31.75%	Lost ✗
2013	Horacio Cartes	1,104,169	48.48%	Elected ✓
2018	Mario Abdo Benítez	1,206,067	48.96%	Elected ✓
2023	Santiago Peña	1,292,079	43.94%	Elected ✓

=== Vice presidential election ===
Election	Party candidate	Votes	%	Result
2000	Félix Argaña	587,498	48.8%	Lost ✗

=== Chamber of Deputies elections ===
Note: From 1947 until 1962, the Colorado Party was the sole legal party. Free and fair elections did not take place until 1993.

Election	Votes	%	Seats	+/–
1949		100.0%	49 / 49	Steady
1953	224,788	100.0%	53 / 53	▲4
1958	295,414	100.0%	60 / 60	▲7
1960		100.0%	60 / 60	Steady
1963	569,551	92.3%	40 / 60	▼20
1968	465,535	71.6%	40 / 60	Steady
1973	681,306	84.7%	40 / 60	Steady
1978	905,461	90.7%	40 / 60	Steady
1983	944,637	91.0%	40 / 60	Steady
1988	1,187,738	89.6%	40 / 60	Steady
1989	845,820	74.5%	48 / 72	Steady
1993	488,342	43.4%	38 / 80	▼2
1998	857,473	53.8%	45 / 80	▲7
2003	520,761	35.3%	37 / 80	▼8
2008	582,932	32.96%	30 / 80	▼7
2013	919,625	40.99%	44 / 80	▲14
2018	927,183	39.10%	42 / 80	▼2
2023	1,345,730	47.43%	48 / 80	▲6

=== Senate elections ===
Note: free and fair elections did not take place until 1993.

Election	Votes	%	Seats	+/–
1968	465,535	71.6%	20 / 30	▲20
1973	681,306	84.7%	20 / 30	Steady
1978	905,461	90.8%	20 / 30	Steady
1983	944,637	91.0%	20 / 30	Steady
1988	1,187,738	89.6%	20 / 30	Steady
1993	498,586	44.0%	20 / 45	Steady
1998	813,287	51.7%	24 / 45	▲4
2003	508,506	34.4%	16 / 45	▼8
2008	509,907	29.07%	15 / 45	▼1
2013	865,206	38.50%	19 / 45	▲4
2018	766,841	32.52%	17 / 45	▼2
2023	1,317,463	45.72%	23 / 45	▲6

== See also ==
- Colorado Party militias
