= Alfredo Stroessner =

Dictator of Paraguay from 1954 to 1989

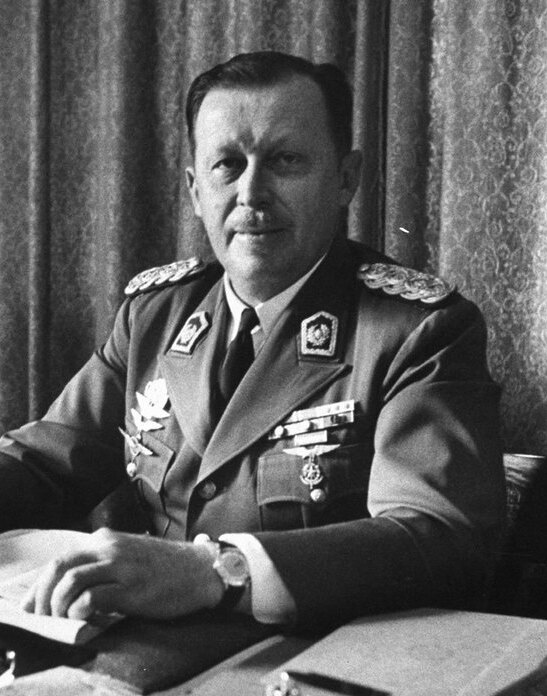
- Stroessner in 1959

42nd President of Paraguay
- In office 15 August 1954 – 3 February 1989
- Preceded by: Tomás Romero Pereira
- Succeeded by: Andrés Rodríguez

Leader of Paraguay
- De facto 4 May 1954 – 15 August 1954
- President: Tomás Romero Pereira
- Preceded by: Federico Chaves (as President)
- Succeeded by: Himself (as President)

Personal details
- Born: 3 November 1912 Encarnación, Paraguay
- Died: 16 August 2006 (aged 93) Brasília, Brazil
- Party: Colorado (1951–1989)
- Spouse: Eligia Mora Delgado (m. 1945; died 2006)
- Children: 3
- Education: Mar. Francisco Solano López Military Academy
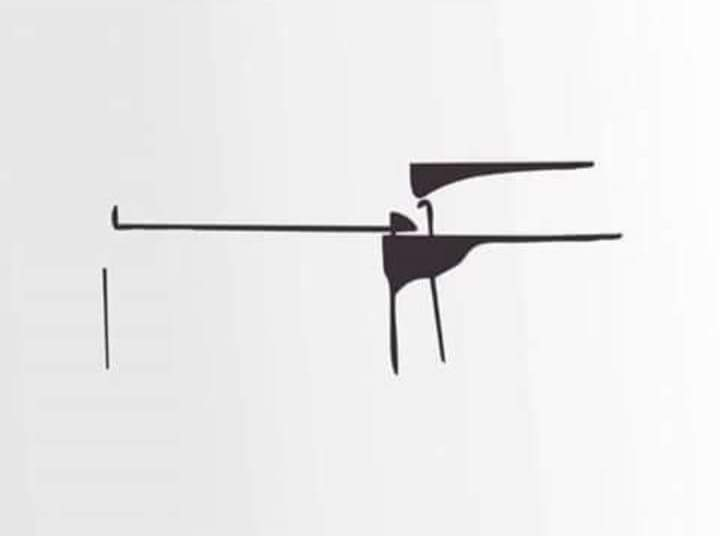
- Signature

Military service
- Allegiance: Paraguay
- Branch/service: Paraguayan Army
- Years of service: 1929–1989
- Rank: General (1956); Lieutenant general (1951); Major general (1949)
- Battles/wars: Chaco War; Battle of Boquerón; Paraguayan Civil War of 1947; Paraguayan coup d'état of 1954; Paraguayan coup d'état of 1989
- Alfredo Stroessner's voice Stroessner's speech during a signing of binational agreements (recorded 29 November 1979)

Alfredo Stroessner Matiauda (Spanish: [alˈfɾeðo esˈtɾosneɾ]; 3 November 1912 – 16 August 2006) was a Paraguayan politician, army general, and military dictator who ruled as the 42nd president of Paraguay from 15 August 1954 until his overthrow in 1989. Known as El Stronato or El Stronismo, his dictatorship was marked by political violence. Before his accession to the presidency, he was the country's de facto leader from May to August 1954.

Stroessner rose to power after leading the 1954 coup d'état on 4 May, with backing from the Colorado Party, and the Paraguayan Army. Following a brief provisional government under Tomás Romero Pereira, he was elected unopposed in the 1954 presidential election, as all opposition parties had been banned since 1947.

He quickly suspended constitutional and civil rights upon taking office on 15 August 1954. With the army and military police, who acted as a secret police, he instituted a period of authoritarian rule and violent political repression (especially of opponents, whose parties were nominally legalized in 1962). From the 1958 through the 1988 elections, Stroessner maintained power by electoral fraud. The Constitution of 1967, introduced on 25 August, permitted his re-election, and changes in 1977 effectively enabled his indefinite rule.

His trusted confidant Lieutenant General Andrés Rodríguez Pedotti seized power in the 1989 coup d'état of 2 and 3 February. Stroessner was exiled to Brazil on 5 February, where he died on 16 August 2006 and was buried. His legacy continues in Paraguay, where his Colorado Party has retained power and continues to rule through clientelistic practices.

== Early life ==
Alfredo Stroessner Matiauda was born in Encarnación on 3 November 1912. His father, Hugo Stroessner, a German Paraguayan, was an accountant from Hof, Bavaria, Germany who immigrated to Paraguay in the last five years of the 1890s. His mother, Heriberta Matiauda, was of Guaraní and Spanish criollo descent.

He joined the Paraguayan army at the age of 16. After attending military school in Asunción, Stroessner fought in the Chaco War between Paraguay and Bolivia, and had been promoted to the rank of first lieutenant by the war's end. During the 1947 Paraguayan Civil War, Stroessner supported the Colorado Party, and played an important role in their victory. In 1951, he became commander-in-chief of the army.

== Dictatorship (1954–1989) ==
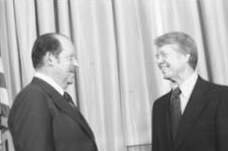
Stroessner meeting with U.S. President Jimmy Carter at the White House in 1977

Stroessner objected to President Federico Chaves's plans to arm the national police and threw him out of office in a coup on 4 May 1954. The National Assembly appointed Tomás Romero Pereira president, who called for special elections to complete Chávez's term. Stroessner became the nominee for the Colorado Party in that year's election on 11 July. He won, as he was the only candidate.

He was reelected seven times—in 1958, 1963, 1968, 1973, 1978, 1983, and 1988. He appeared alone on the ballot in 1958. In his other elections, he won by implausibly high margins; only once (1968) did he drop below 80 percent of the vote. That campaign was also the only time an opposition candidate got more than 20 percent of the vote. He served for 35 years, with only Fidel Castro having a longer tenure among 20th-century Latin American leaders; though Castro's tenure as president was shorter at 32 years (1976–2008).

Soon after taking office, Stroessner placed the entire country under a state of siege and suspended civil liberties. The state-of-siege provisions allowed the government to arrest and detain anyone indefinitely without trial, as well as forbid public meetings and demonstrations. It was renewed every 90 days until 1987, except for a brief period in 1959. Although it technically only applied to Asunción after 1970, the courts ruled that anyone charged with security offenses could be brought to the capital and charged under the state-of-siege provisions—even if the offense took place outside the capital. Apart from one 24-hour period on election days, Stroessner ruled under what amounted to martial law for nearly all of his tenure. A devoted anti-communist who brought Paraguay into the World Anti-Communist League, he justified his repression as a necessary measure to protect the country. The use of political repression, threats and death squads was a key factor in Stroessner's longevity as dictator of Paraguay. He maintained virtually unlimited power by giving a free hand to the military and to Minister of Interior Edgar Ynsfrán, who began to harass, terrorize, and occasionally murder family members of the regime's opponents. Stroessner heavily relied on various Colorado Party militias, subordinated to his control, to crush any dissent within the country.

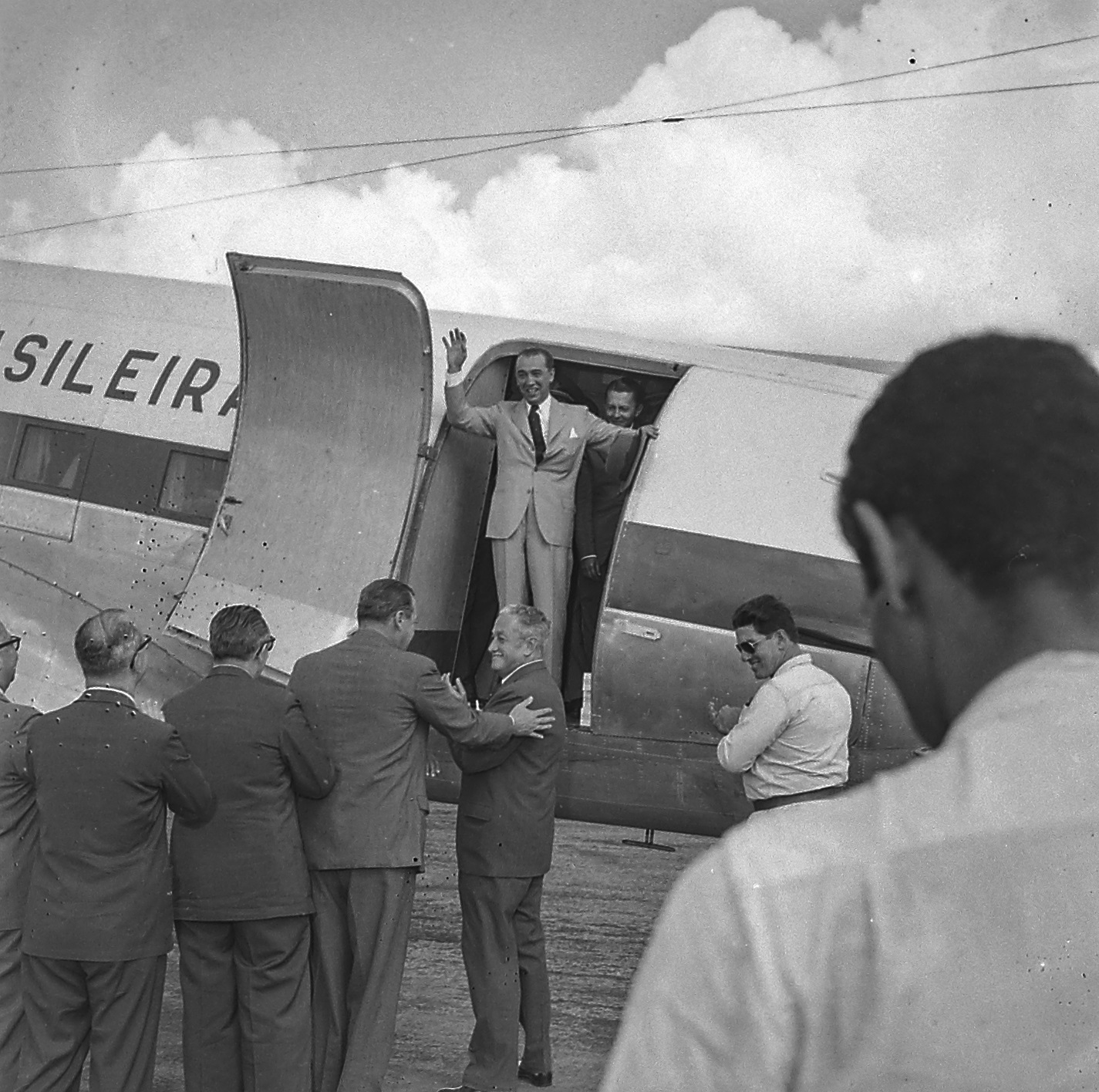
Stroessner with Juscelino Kubitschek in Brasília, 1958

The Stroessner regime's strong anti-communist stance earned it the support of the United States, with which it enjoyed close military and economic ties and supported the U.S. invasion of the Dominican Republic. The Stroessner regime even offered to send troops to Vietnam alongside the Americans. The United States played a "critical supporting role" in the domestic affairs of Stoessner's Paraguay. Between 1962 and 1975 the US provided $146 million to Paraguay's military government and Paraguayan officers were trained at the U.S. Army School of the Americas. Although the military and security forces under Stroessner received less material support from the United States than other South American countries, strong inter-military connections existed through military advisors and military training. Between 1962 and 1966, nearly 400 Paraguayan military personnel were trained by the United States in the Panama Canal Zone and on US soil. Strong Paraguayan-U.S. relations continued until the Carter Administration emphasized a foreign policy that recognized human rights abuses, although both military and economic aid were allotted to the Paraguayan government in Carter's budgets. The Reagan Administration restored more cordial relations due to Stroessner's staunch anti-communism, but by the mid-1980s relations cooled, largely because of the international outcry over the regime's excesses, along with its involvement in narcotics trafficking and money-laundering. In 1986, the Reagan administration added his regime to its list of Latin American dictatorships. In addition, in September 1974, his Paraguay also established the diplomatic relations with South Vietnam, which was fighting against a communist invasion from the North. (Note: Paraguay recognized the State of Vietnam in 1950. With the division of Vietnam in 1954, the State of Vietnam controlled the south and later became the Republic of Vietnam in 1955. It wasn't until September 1974 that Paraguay recognized the Republic of Vietnam, but this relationship ended in 1975 when North Vietnam conquered the South.)

As leader of the Colorado Party, Stroessner exercised nearly complete control over the nation's political scene. Although opposition parties were nominally permitted after 1962 (the Colorado Party had been the only legal party in the country since 1947), Paraguay remained for all intents and purposes a one-party state. Elections were so heavily rigged in favor of the Colorados that the opposition had no realistic chance of winning, and opposition figures were subjected to varying degrees of harassment. Furthermore, Stroessner's Paraguay became a haven for Nazi war criminals, including Josef Mengele, and non-communist peaceful opposition was crushed. Given Stroessner's affinity for Nazism and harboring of Nazi war criminals, foreign press often referred to his government as the "poor man's Nazi regime".

Stroessner's rule brought more stability than most of the country's living residents had previously known. From 1927 to 1954, the country had had 22 presidents, including six from 1948 to 1954 alone. However, that stability came at a high cost. Corruption was rampant (Stroessner himself did not dispute charges of corruption at some levels in his government) and Paraguay's human rights record was considered one of the poorest in South America. During Stroessner's regime, an estimated 3,000 to 4,000 people were murdered, 400 to 500 more "disappeared", and thousands more imprisoned and tortured. Scapegoating, detainment, and torture of LGBTQ+ Paraguayans occurred frequently throughout this period.

Press freedom was also limited, constitutional guarantees notwithstanding. Any outcry about government mistreatment or attacks toward the Colorado Party would result in destruction of the media outlets. Many media executives were sent to prison or tortured. Because of this, political opponents were few and far between. Near the end of this presidency, he declared that he would remove the state of siege, but quickly recanted after students began protesting trolley fares.

Stroessner (right) greets Brazilian President Humberto de Alencar Castelo Branco during the opening ceremonies of the Friendship Bridge, connecting Brazil and Paraguay, 27 March 1965

For the first 13 years of his rule, Stroessner ruled under a severely authoritarian constitution enacted in 1940. In the mid-1960s, in an attempt to placate growing international criticism, Stroessner began allowing some opposition parties to function, although these functioned as opposition in name only. Stroessner also fired the interior minister Ynsfrán in 1966, but his replacement, Sabino Augusto Montanaro (a member of the "Cuatrinomio de Oro", a group of politicians intimately connected to Stroessner) continued the same violent policies. In 1967, a constituent assembly replaced the 1940 constitution with an equally repressive document. While it forbade the exercise of dictatorial powers, it vested Stroessner with many of the same sweeping executive and legislative powers he had held under its predecessor. The president retained broad latitude to take exceptional actions for the good of the country, such as suspending civil liberties and intervening in the economy. It thus formed the legal basis for the state of virtual martial law under which Stroessner governed. While it limited the president to two five-year terms, it stipulated that only those terms completed after the 1968 election would count toward that limit. In 1977, faced with having to leave office for good the following year, Stroessner pushed through a constitutional amendment allowing him to run for an unlimited number of five-year terms.

=== Operation Condor ===
Paraguay was a leading participant in Operation Condor, a campaign of state terror and security operations officially implemented in 1975 which were jointly conducted by the military dictatorships of six South American countries (Chile, Argentina, Bolivia, Paraguay, Uruguay and Brazil) with the support of the United States. Human rights violations characteristic of those in other South American countries such as kidnappings, torture, forced disappearances, and extrajudicial killings were routine and systematic during the Stroessner regime. Following executions, many of the bodies of those killed by the regime were dumped in the Chaco or the Río Paraguay. The discovery of the "Archives of Terror" in 1992 in the Lambaré suburb of Asunción confirmed allegations of widespread human rights violations.

During Stroessner's rule, two special departments were organized under the Ministry of the Interior led by Edgar Ynsfrán: the Department of Investigations of the Metropolitan Police (Departamento de Investigaciones de la Policía de la Capital, DIPC) under the leadership of Pastor Coronel, and the National Directorate of Technical Affairs (Dirección Nacional de Asuntos Técnicos, DNAT) directed by Antonio Campos Alum. Both units specialized in political repression. Pastor Coronel became infamous for his brutality. He would interrogate prisoners in a pileta, a bath of human vomit and excrement, or ram electric cattle prods up their rectums. In 1975, the Secretary of the Paraguayan Communist Party, Miguel Ángel Soler, was dismembered alive by chainsaw while Stroessner listened on the phone. The screams of tortured dissidents were often recorded and played over the phone to family members, and sometimes the bloody garments of those killed were sent to their homes.

Under Stroessner, egregious human rights violations were committed against the indigenous Aché population of Paraguay's eastern districts, largely as the result of US and European corporations wanting access to the country's forests, mines, and grazing lands. The Aché resided on land that was coveted and had resisted relocation attempts by the Paraguayan army. The government retaliated with massacres and forced many Aché into slavery. In 1974, the UN accused Paraguay of slavery and genocide. Only a few hundred Aché remained alive by the late 1970s. The Stroessner regime financed this genocide with US aid.

Stroessner was careful not to show off or draw attention from jealous generals or foreign journalists. He avoided rallies and took simple holidays in Patagonia. He became more tolerant of opposition as the years passed, but there was no change in the regime's basic character.

During Stroessner's rule, no socialist nations had diplomatic relations with Paraguay, with the sole exception of non-aligned Yugoslavia. Stroessner made many state visits, including to Japan, the United States, and France, as well as to South Africa, a country which Paraguay developed close bilateral ties with in the 1970s. He also made several visits to West Germany, although over the years his relations with that country deteriorated. Since he had always been known as pro-German, this worsening of relations, combined with his feeling that the US had abandoned him, was regarded as a personal blow to Stroessner.

It has been asserted that the Roman Catholic Church is the only reason Stroessner did not have absolute control over the country. In 1971, the Archbishop of Asunción Ismael Rolón Silvero excommunicated the minister of the interior and the chief of police in response to attacks on priests. On September 12, 1972, police attacked a protest meeting and tore down anti-government posters at the Catholic University. When Pope John Paul II visited Paraguay in 1988, his visit bolstered what was already a robust anti-Stroessner movement within the country.

Stroessner gave a written television interview to Alan Whicker as part of a documentary called The Last Dictator (UK: 7 April 1970) for the television series Whicker's World. The program was released in a Region 2 DVD box-set by the UK's Network imprint.

=== Economics ===
Stroessner dedicated large portions of the Paraguayan national budget to the military and police apparatus, both fundamental to the maintenance of the regime. According to a 1963 article from Time magazine, Stroessner spent 33% of the 1962 annual budget on army and police, 15% for education, and just 2% for public works. There was no income tax and public spending was the smallest percentage of GDP in Latin America.

Stroessner enacted several economic development projects, including the building of the Itaipu Dam, the largest hydroelectric power plant in the world at the time: although Paraguay received only 15% of the contracts, it was a major factor in the country having the highest rate of growth in Latin America for most of the 1970s. The construction of the Itaipu Dam, as well as that of the subsequent Yacyretá Dam on the Paraguay–Argentina Border, displaced thousands of Paraguayans, often without any restitution. The Itaipu Dam displaced at least 80,000 Paraguayans, and the Yacyretá was estimated to have displaced at least as many by December 2008. 160 workers died building the Itaipu Dam.

Stroessner also promoted projects that purportedly developed the country's infrastructure. Amongst these were the improvement of highways and the issuing of 15–20 hectare land grants to military personnel upon completion of their service, provided that the land would be used for farming purposes. Over 10,000 soldiers took up this offer. By the end of the Stronato, the second biggest city was Puerto Flor de Lis (renamed "Puerto Presidente Stroessner," then "Ciudad del Este"), founded just 32 years before.

=== Downfall ===
In April 1987, Stroessner lifted the state of siege as part of the run-up to elections the following spring. However, several draconian security laws remained in effect, meaning that the substance (if not the form) of the state of siege was still in place. As had been the case for over three decades, opposition leaders continued to be arbitrarily arrested and opposition meetings and demonstrations were broken up (often brutally). Stroessner was nominated by the Colorados once again, and was the only candidate who was allowed to campaign completely unmolested. Under these circumstances, the February 1988 election was no different from past elections, with Stroessner officially registering 89 percent of the vote — a margin that his rivals contended could have been obtained only through massive fraud.

On 3 February 1989, only six months after being sworn in for what would have been his eighth full term, Stroessner was ousted in a coup d'état led by General Andrés Rodríguez, his closest confidant for over three decades. One reason for the coup was that the generals feared one of Stroessner's offspring would succeed him. Of the two, Alfredo was a cocaine addict and Gustavo, a pilot, was loathed for being homosexual. A more outlandish rumor was that Lino Oviedo threatened Rodríguez with a grenade if he did not launch the coup. The two generals, Rodríguez and Oviedo, fought a brief artillery duel over Asunción. The coup was supported by most of the "traditionalist" faction of the Colorados, who had come to favor a less repressive way of rule. Among them was Ynsfrán, who claimed plans for a coup were being drawn up in mid-1988.

== Later life and death ==
After the coup, Stroessner fled to Brazil, where he lived in exile for the next 17 years until his death.

The eastern city of Puerto Flor de Lis, which had been renamed Puerto Presidente Stroessner in his honor, was again renamed to Ciudad del Este in 1989 after the end of the dictatorship. Asunción's airport had also been named after him during his regime, but was later renamed Silvio Pettirossi International Airport after Paraguayan aviator Silvio Pettirossi.

In 1992, an opponent of the dictatorship named Martín Almada, and the newspaper Noticias through its journalists Christian Torres, Zulia Giménez, Alberto Ledesma, José Gregor, and others, discovered the so-called "Archives of Terror", documents that proved that Stroessner had participated in Operation Condor, an anti-communist military agreement for the persecution of exiles, which led to the torture, kidnapping, and murder of thousands of Paraguayans and citizens of the aforementioned countries. Almada would request Stroessner's extradition from Spanish judge Baltasar Garzón. At the same time, rumors began to circulate that Stroessner was suffering from skin cancer. In 2004, Stroessner’s grandson was nominated for the presidency of the Colorado Party for the Alto Paraná department, as the former dictator enjoyed high popularity in that department, but he was ultimately defeated at the polls.

On July 16, 2006, Stroessner was admitted to Santa Lucía Hospital in Brasília for surgery for two inguinal hernias. The results were satisfactory in the first few days, but he then suffered a pulmonary complication that led to pneumonia and kept him in critical condition. Stroessner died on 16 August 2006 at the age of 93. The immediate cause of death was a stroke. The Paraguayan government preemptively dismissed any suggestions for honouring the late president within Paraguay. His remains were expected to be transferred to Paraguay in a few months, but the government, led by Colorado candidate Nicanor Duarte Frutos, announced that it would not receive Stroessner's body with honors. He tried to return to Paraguay before his death, but he was rebuked and threatened with arrest by the government.

== Family ==
=== Marriage and children ===
Stroessner was married to Eligia Mora Delgado (26 December 1910 – 3 February 2006). They had three children, Gustavo Adolfo, Graciela Concepción and Alfredo Hugo. The couple were forcibly separated after his exile; she fled to the US, while he was given asylum in Brazil. Although they stayed in touch by phone and occasionally met, they were unable to live together, and neither Stroessner nor his son were able to return to Paraguay to attend her funeral. Gustavo left the country along with his father in 1989 to exile in Brazil, avoiding prosecution for illegally accumulating wealth in the process. He would return 20 years later due to the statute of limitations running out. In 2011, he died in Asunción of lung cancer.

In 2020, Graciela granted permission for her father's corpse to be exhumed.

=== Extramarital affairs and child abuse ===
Stroessner engaged in extramarital affairs before and during his presidency. According to many sources, he also sexually abused girls as young as 13 years old. According to journalist Andrés Colman, sexual slavery occurred in twelve detention centers throughout the nation, and was also committed by Paraguayan officers, as well as by some of Stroessner's relatives. As a result of this he may have fathered over 30 illegitimate children. The affairs and child abuse were divulged after his downfall, further tarnishing his image.

== Legacy ==
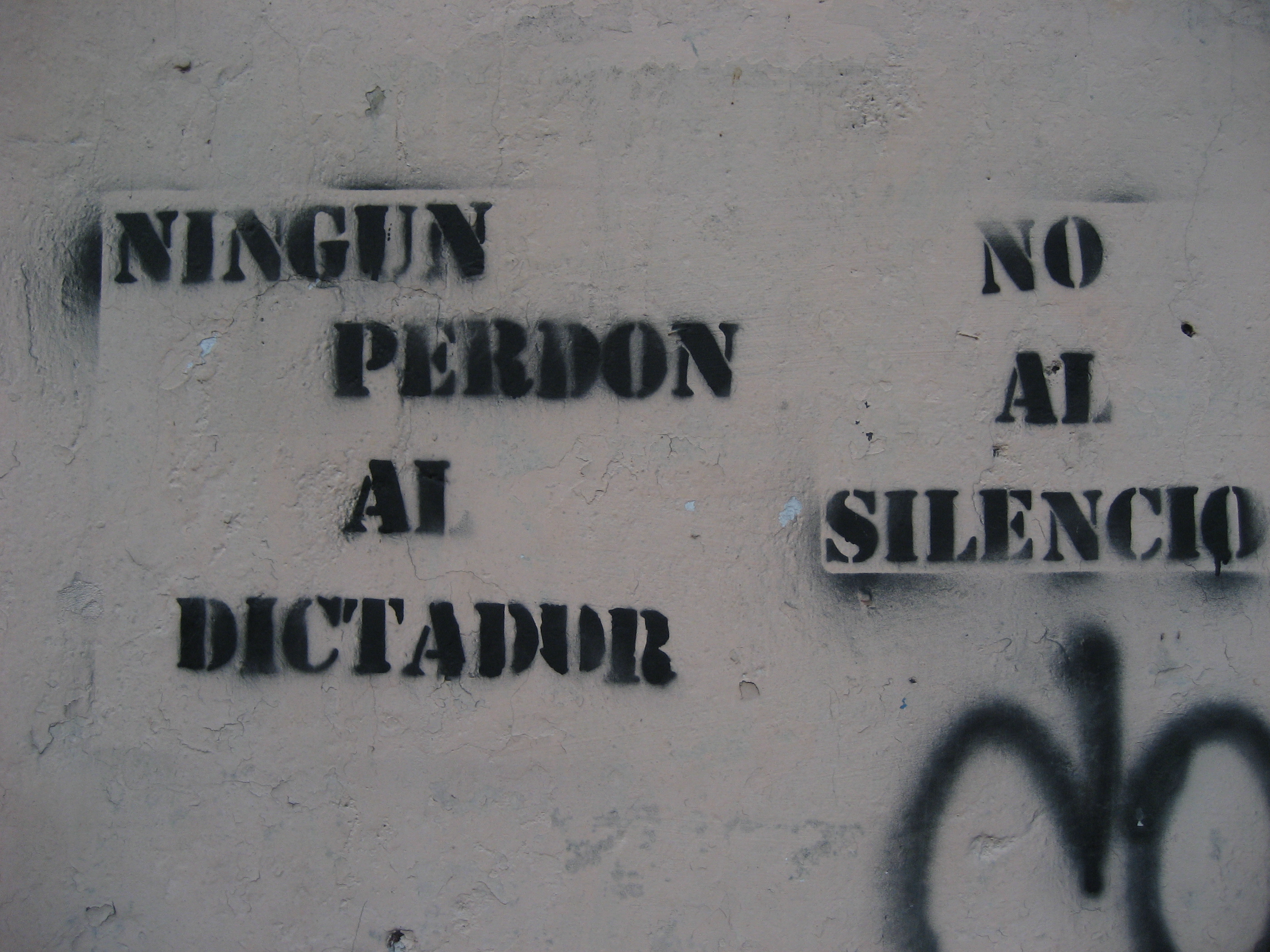
Anti-Stroessner graffiti in Asunción. The text reads, "No forgiveness to the dictator. No to silence". (Spanish: Ningún perdón al dictador. No al silencio.)

Stroessner was the second-longest serving leader of a Latin American country. His 35-year dictatorship was surpassed in length by only Fidel Castro's rule of Cuba. It was also the longest-lived dictatorship in South America. Even after Stroessner's rule, the Colorado Party has continually held the presidency of Paraguay, with the exception of from 2008 to 2013, following the election of Fernando Lugo. The social scientist Antonio Soljancic has argued that this is because, although Stroessner was removed from power, "he left a legacy that no one has tried to bury". Many public schools avoid historical discussions of the Stroessner dictatorship, and many still feature plaques paying tribute to him as of 2024.

Mario Abdo Benítez, a member of Colorado Party who served as the president of Paraguay from 2018 to 2023, was the son of Stroessner's personal secretary. Journalist Isabel Debre expressed the view that Abdo Benítez's election to the presidency in 2018 was when Stroessner's enduring influence was "never more obvious" due to this connection. Abdo Benítez has opined that Stroessner "did much for the country" (Spanish: hizo mucho por el país), but voiced his disapproval of Stroessner's human rights violations. In a similar vein, then President Santiago Peña, in statements made in May 2023, downplayed the authoritarian nature of the Stroessner period, referring to it as a period of "human rights deficit," but with positive externalities associated with political stability and resilience in the face of regional crises. Peña avoided openly describing it as a dictatorship, suggesting that its historical legacy requires a balanced reading.

According to a 2022 poll by the Centro Estratégico Latinoamericano de Geopolítica (Latin American Strategic Centre for Geopolitics) of who Paraguayans viewed as their best president of the past three decades, Stroessner was the answer of 14.4% of respondents, above President Nicanor Duarte, but below Presidents Lugo and Horacio Cartes.

Stroessner's supporters are known as "Stronistas", and they refer to him as "El Único Líder" (Spanish: The Only Leader). Every year, nostalgic Stronistas celebrate the anniversary of Stroessner's birth. His supporters have asserted that "another Stroessner" is needed to govern modern Paraguay, and that his was a time of security and stability.

As part of political persecution, Stroessner's regime was responsible for exiling 20,814 Paraguayans. Around 425 to 500 people were forcibly disappeared. The search for some bodies of the disappeared by families of the victims was still ongoing as of 2022. An estimated 18,000 to 20,000 people were subjected to torture and other abuses by Stroessner's government.

The persistence of the Stroessner legacy has also been noted in the limited judicialization of crimes against humanity committed during the dictatorship: only a few state agents and one civilian have been convicted, and the process of identifying missing persons only formally began in 2016. This situation has been denounced by figures such as Monsignor Mario Melanio Medina, former president of the Truth and Justice Commission, who attributes the lack of progress to a lack of political will on the part of successor democratic governments.

One of the most structurally persistent effects of the Stroessner regime is the worsening socioeconomic inequality, particularly regarding land tenure and distribution. Although Paraguay no longer leads global land concentration indices, recent reports from organizations such as Oxfam and Amnesty International continue to identify the country as one of the most unequal in Latin America in this area. In 2023, Oxfam documented that 1.6% of the population held 80% of the national agricultural land.

This extreme land concentration can be traced directly to clientelist practices institutionalized during the Stronism, when, between 1954 and 1989, approximately 8 million hectares were irregularly awarded to actors linked to the regime, equivalent to almost a third of the country's total arable land. These areas are currently recognized as "ill-gotten lands," and their restitution continues to be a constant source of socio-territorial conflicts, especially among peasant and indigenous communities claiming ancestral rights to these spaces.

In part due to Stroessner's abuses, Paraguay enacted a new constitution in 1992 that hedged the presidency about with numerous checks and balances to prevent another president from completely dominating the system. Most importantly, the president is limited to a single five-year term with no possibility of reelection, even if nonsuccessive. No one who has held the office, even for a partial term, is allowed to run or serve again. In 2017, the legislature debated an amendment that would have allowed the president to run for two terms, whether successive or separated. This would have allowed then-president Horacio Cartes to run for reelection. However, the ban on any sort of reelection has become so entrenched in Paraguayan politics that massive protests forced the Colorados to abandon those plans.

== Cultural legacy ==
Stroessner's dictatorship and government censorship is reflected in 2025 documentary essay Under the Flags, the Sun by Paraguay director Juanjo Pereira.

== Bibliography ==
- Gimlette, John (2005). At the Tomb of the Inflatable Pig: Travels Through Paraguay. Vintage Books. ISBN 978-1400078523.
- Nickson, R. Andrew (2015). Historical Dictionary of Paraguay (Third ed.). Rowman & Littlefield. ISBN 978-0-8108-7819-8.
- Santicaten (1973). Charlas con el general Stroessner. Editorial Internacional de Grandes Autores Latino-Americanos.

Political offices
Preceded by Tomás Romero	President of Paraguay; 1954–1989	Succeeded by Andrés Rodríguez
