= Recoleta Cemetery, Asuncion =

Cemetery located in Asunción, Paraguay

Recoleta Cemetery
- Cementerio de la Recoleta
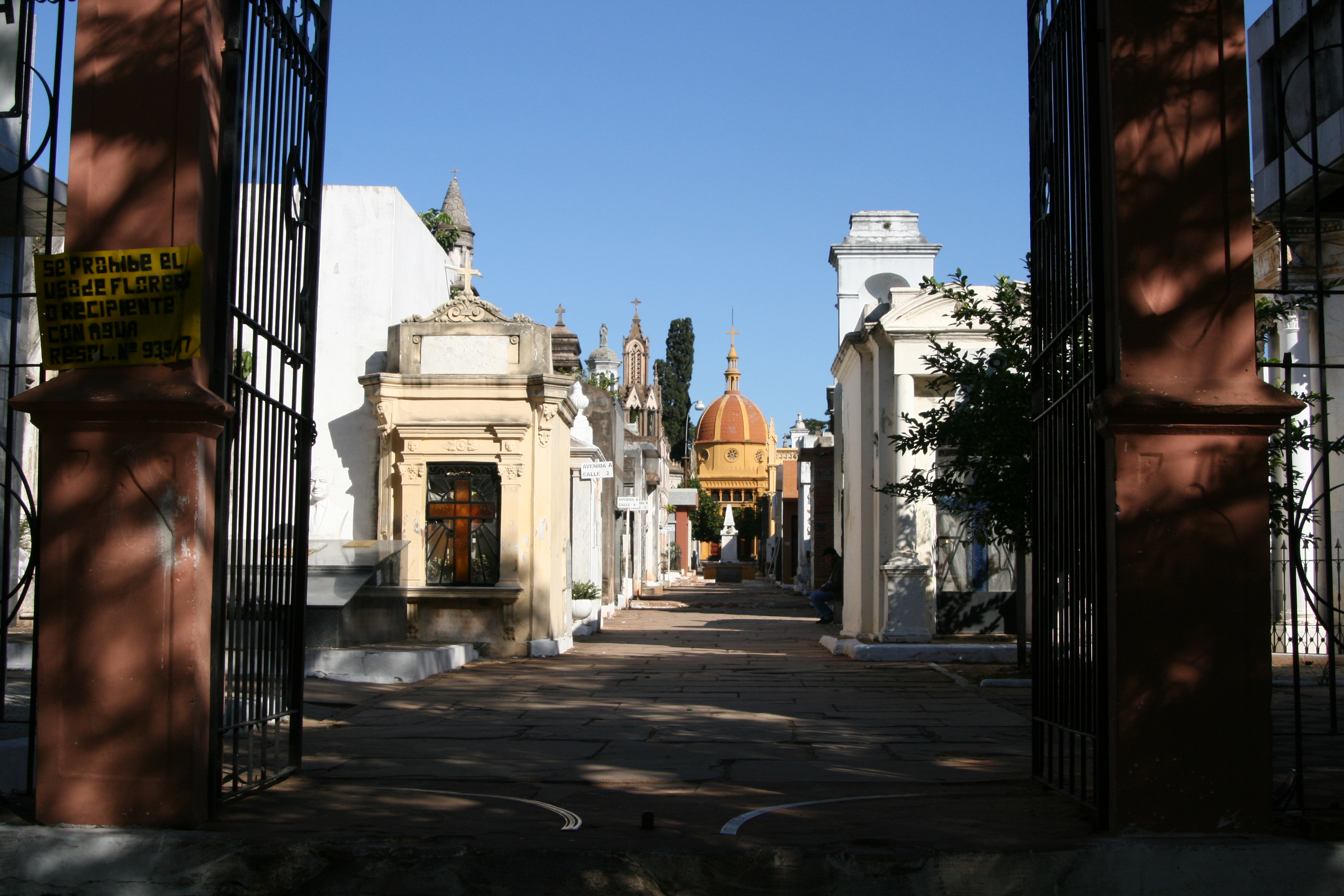
- Interactive map of Recoleta Cemetery

Details
- Established: 1842
- Location: Recoleta, Asunción
- Country: Paraguay
- Coordinates: 25.2927°S 57.5894°W
- Size: 14 ha (35 acres)
- Find a Grave: Recoleta Cemetery

La Recoleta Cemetery (Spanish: Cementerio de la Recoleta) is a national cemetery located on the Avenue Mariscal López, Recoleta, Asunción, Paraguay. It contains the graves of important figures in the country's history, including presidents of Paraguay. The Cemetery is open to the public and has an area of about 14 hectares.

== History ==
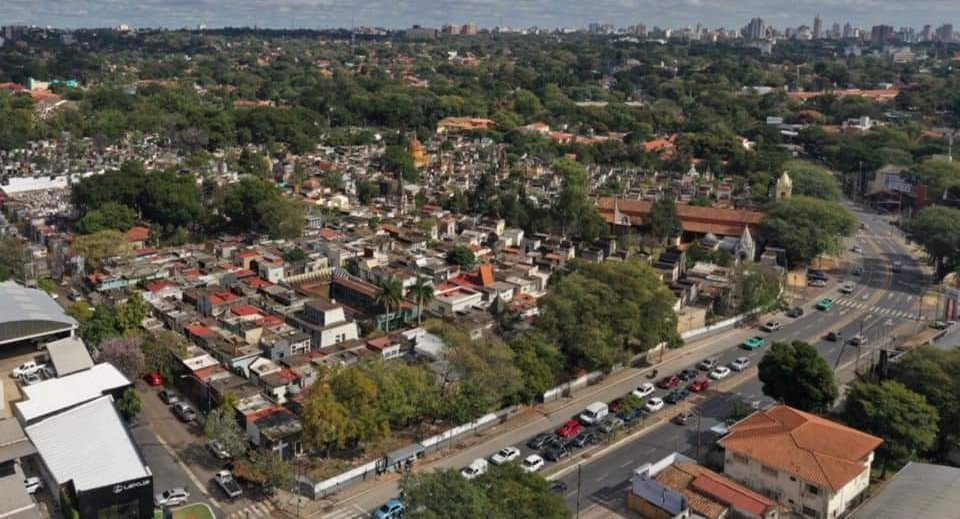
Aerial view of the Recoleta Cemetery in Asunción

The cemetery is on the site of a Franciscan Recollets convent, nationalised by José Gaspar Rodríguez de Francia who had appointed himself head of the Paraguayan Church.

Its origin dates from 20 October 1842 the date of its establishment by the government of Carlos Antonio López and consul Mariano Roque Alonso. Its creation was due to the lack of space for the burial of the deceased. Prior to this, remains were buried in churches or in the patios of houses. It was the first general public cemetery in the city and the country.

== Notable interments ==
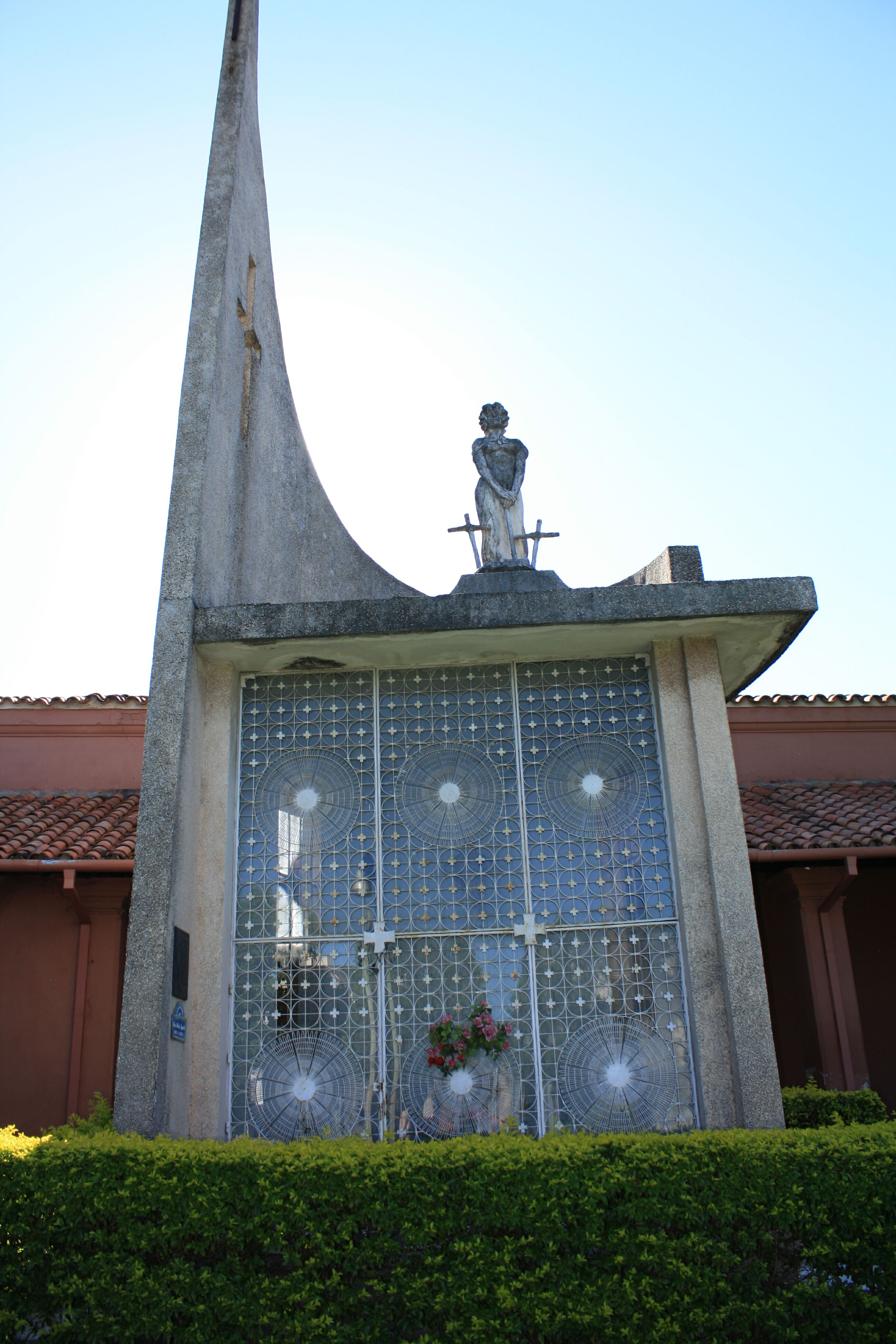
Tomb of Eliza Alicia Lynch at the Recoleta Cemetery in Asunción

- Dr Tomás Benjamín Aceval (1845–1900), diplomat
- Luis María Argaña (1932–1999), Vice President of Paraguay
- Augusto Roa Bastos (1917–2005), author
- Marco de Brix (1963–2009), singer
- León Cadogan (1899–1973), ethnologist
- Serafina Dávalos (1883–1957), prominent feminist and lawyer
- José Segundo Decoud (1848-1909), politician and diplomat
- Alejandro Guanes (1872–1925), poet and journalist
- Hermann Guggiari (1924–2012), engineer and sculptor
- Julián de la Herrería (1888–1937), painter, engraver and ceramicist
- Eliza Lynch (1833–1886), First Lady of Paraguay
- Ananías Maidana (1923–2010), teacher and politician
- Epifanio Méndez Fleitas (1917–1985), musician, writer and poet
- Mario Halley Mora (1926–2003), journalist, writer, playwright and poet
- Fulgencio R. Moreno (1872–1933), journalist
- Luis Alberto del Paraná (1926–1974), singer and guitarist
- Marcelo Pecci (1976–2022), anti-drug and organized crime prosecutor
- Silvio Pettirossi (1887–1916), aviation pioneer
- Josefina Plá (1903–1999), poet, playwright and journalist
- María Odulia Nicola Ruotti (1922–2006), singer and composer
- Adela Speratti (1865–1902), educator
- Celsa Speratti (1868–1938), educator
- Pascual Urdapilleta (1780–1856), architect
- William Henry Keld Whytehead (1825–1865), engineer-in-chief to the Government of Paraguay
- Roque Vallejos (1943–2006), poet, psychiatrist and essayist

=== Presidents ===
- Patricio Escobar (1843–1912), 10th President of Paraguay
- Juan Gualberto González (1851–1912), 11th President of Paraguay
- Emilio Aceval (1853–1931), 14th President of Paraguay
- Andrés Héctor Carvallo (1862–1934), 15th President of Paraguay
- Juan Antonio Escurra (1859–1929), 16th President of Paraguay
- Cecilio Báez (1862–1941), 18th President of Paraguay
- Emiliano González Navero (1861–1934), 20th President of Paraguay
- Pedro Peña (1864–1943), 24th President of Paraguay
- Eduardo Schaerer (1873–1941), 25th President of Paraguay
- Luis Alberto Riart (1880–1953), 30th President of Paraguay
- José Patricio Guggiari (1884–1957), 31st President of Paraguay
- Rafael Franco (1896–1973), 32nd President of Paraguay
- Higinio Morínigo (1897–1983), 35th President of Paraguay
- Juan Manuel Frutos (1879–1960), 36th President of Paraguay
- Raimundo Rolón (1903–1981), 38th President of Paraguay
- Felipe Molas López (1901–1954), 39th President of Paraguay
- Federico Chávez (1882–1978), 40th President of Paraguay

== Gallery ==
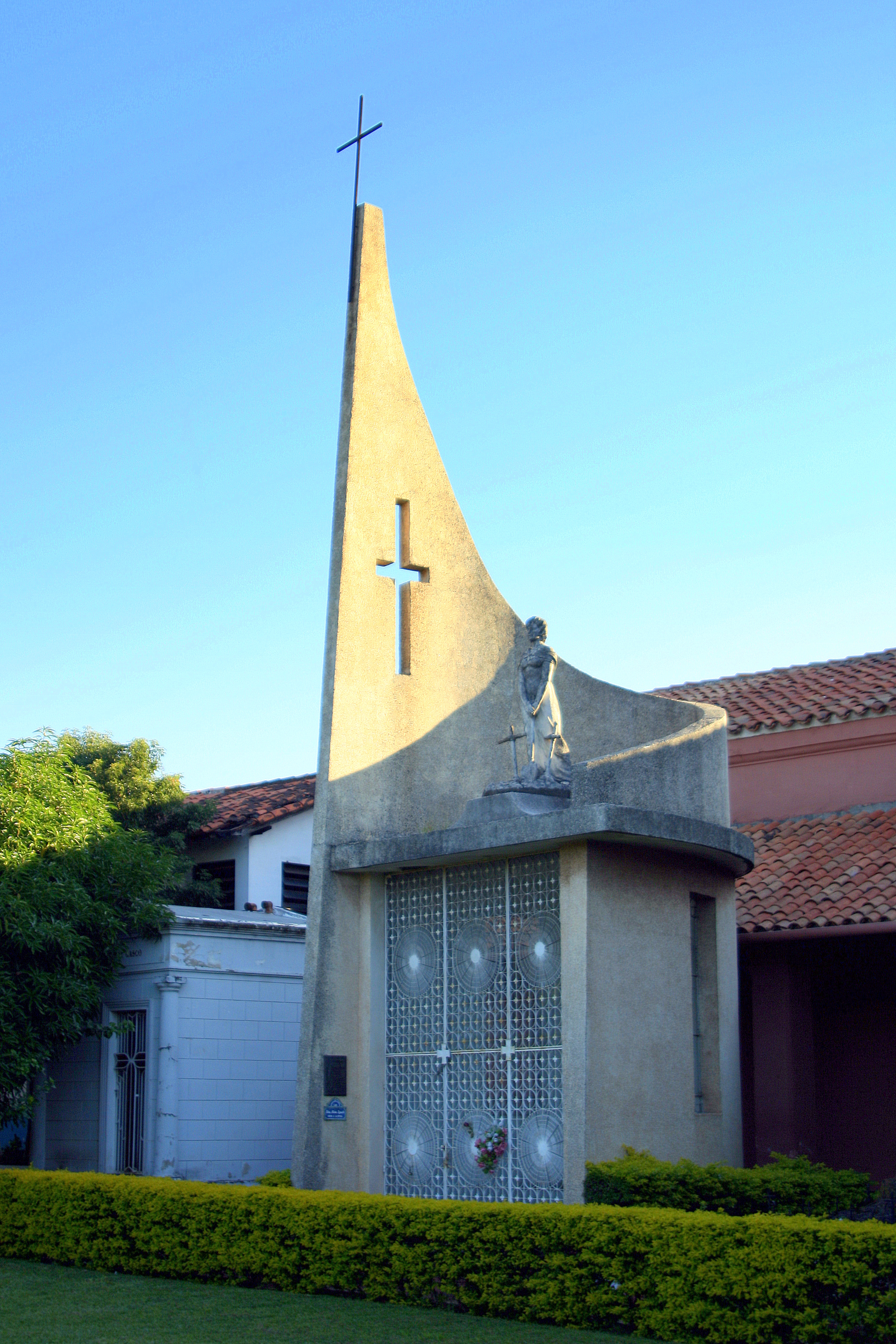

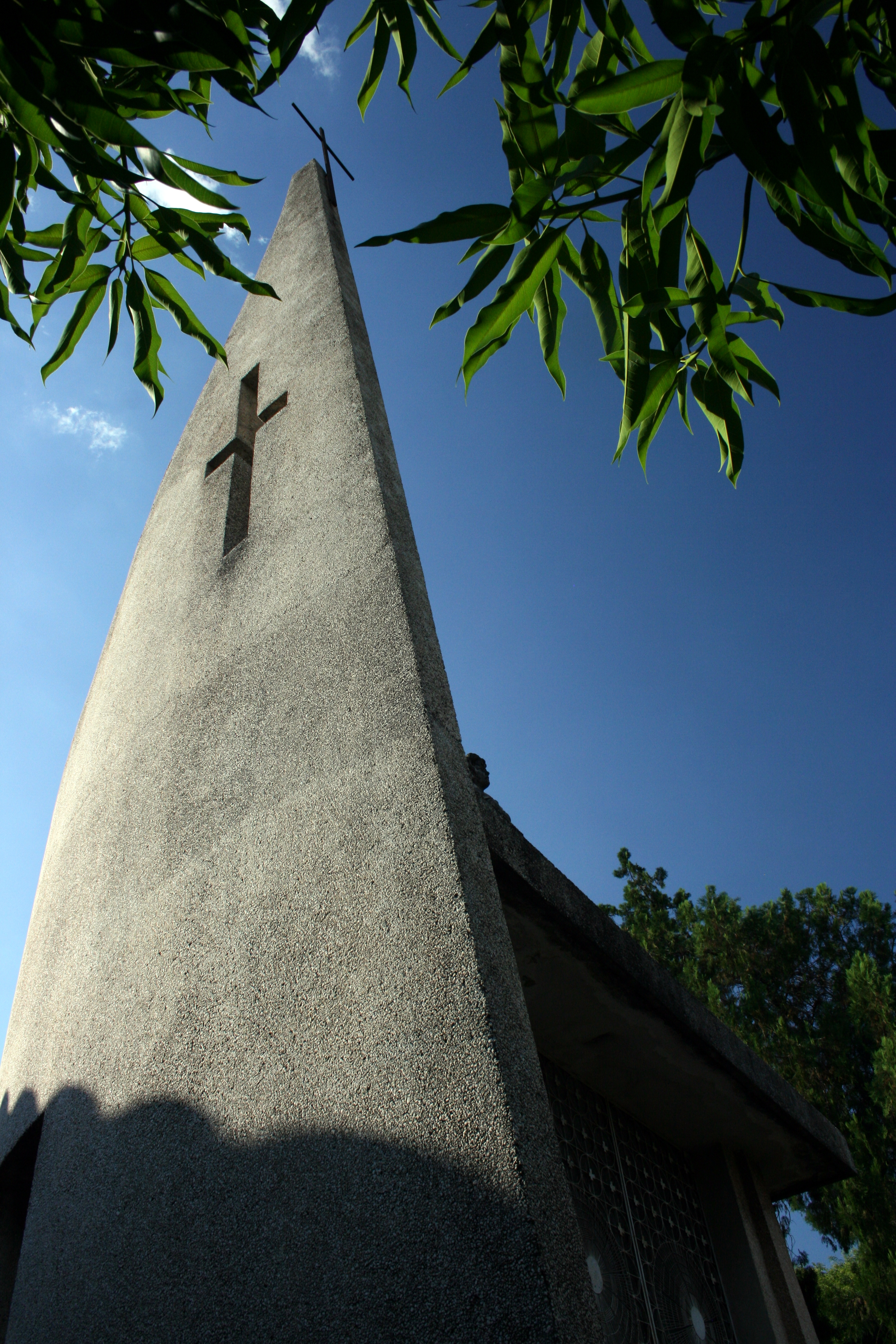

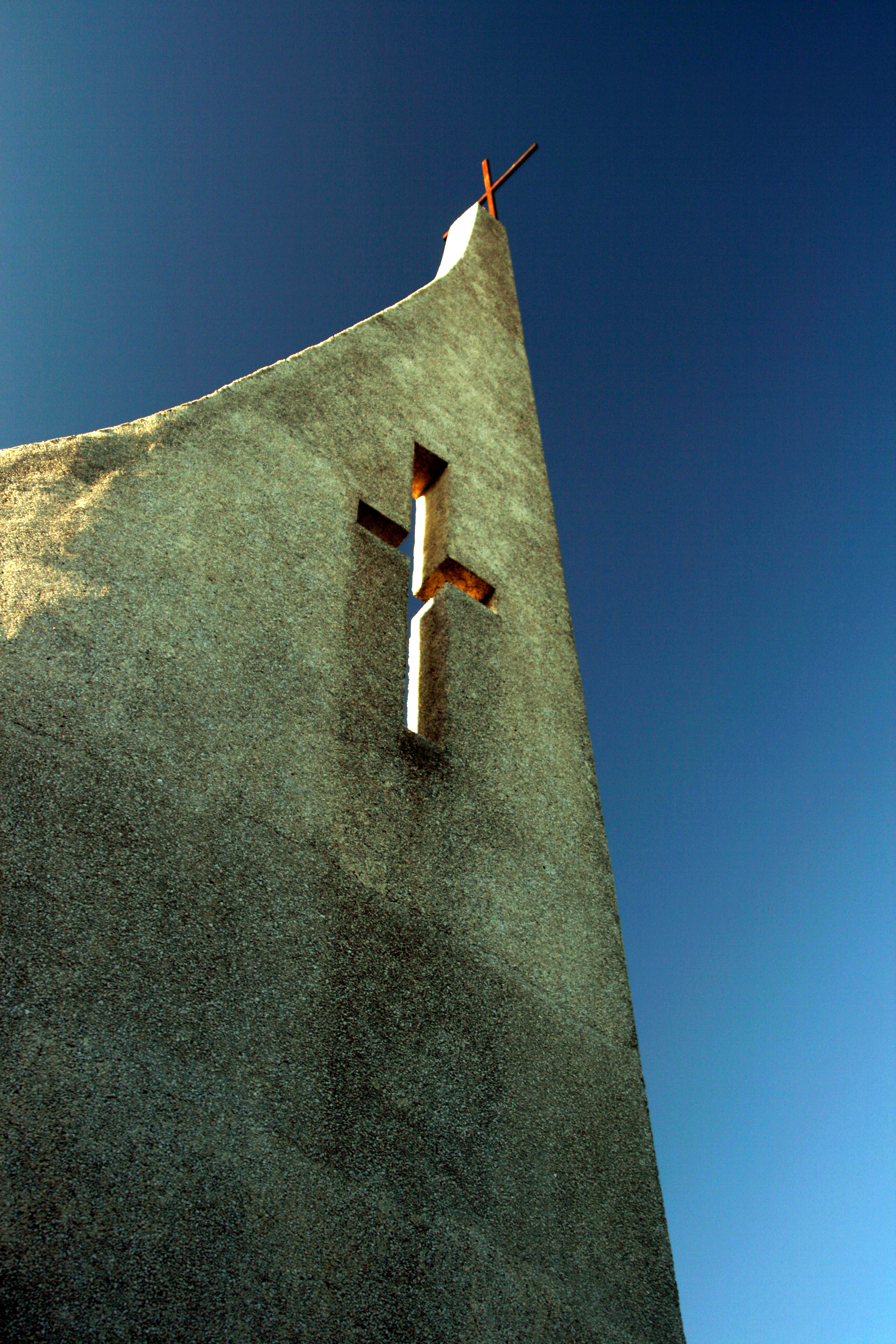

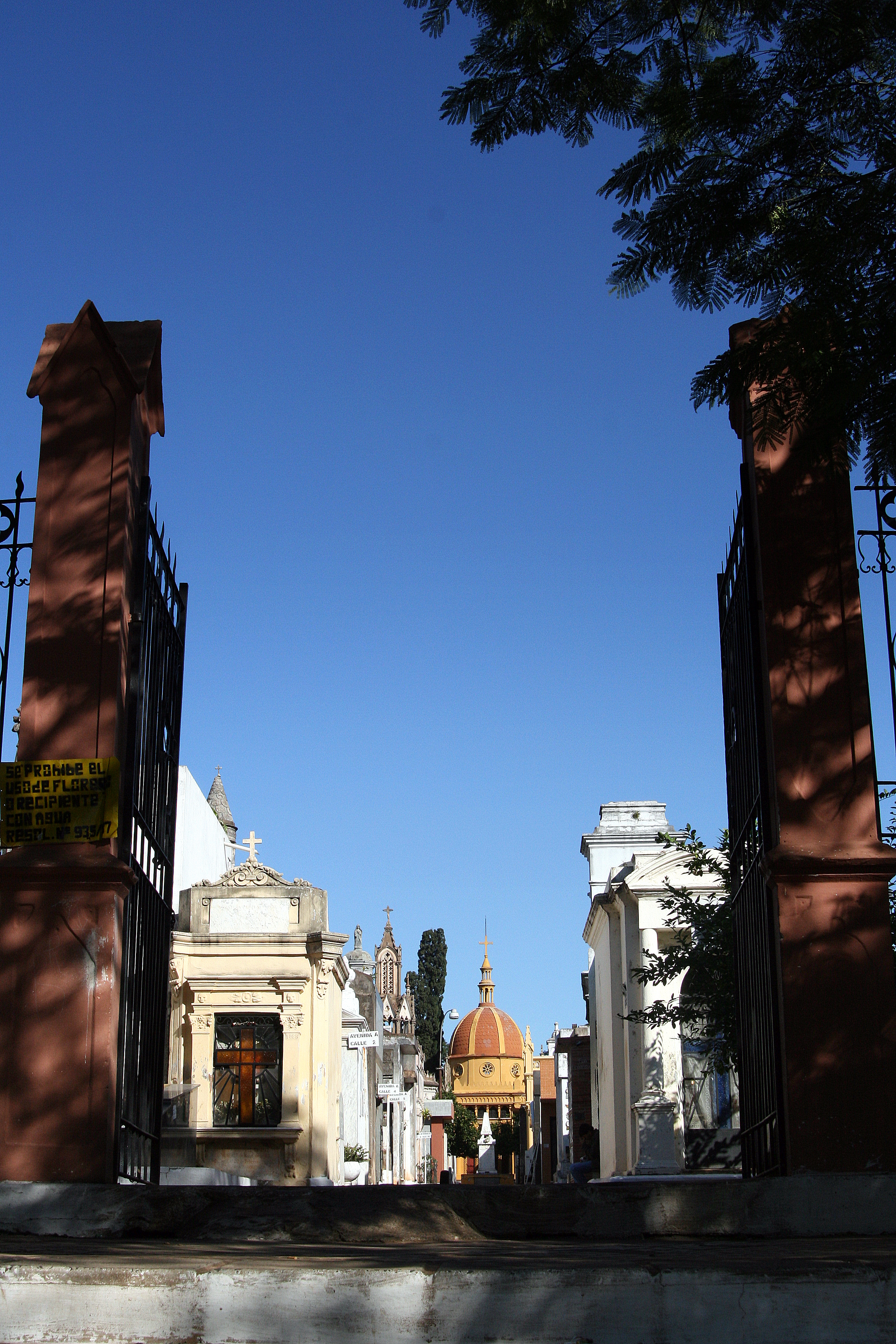

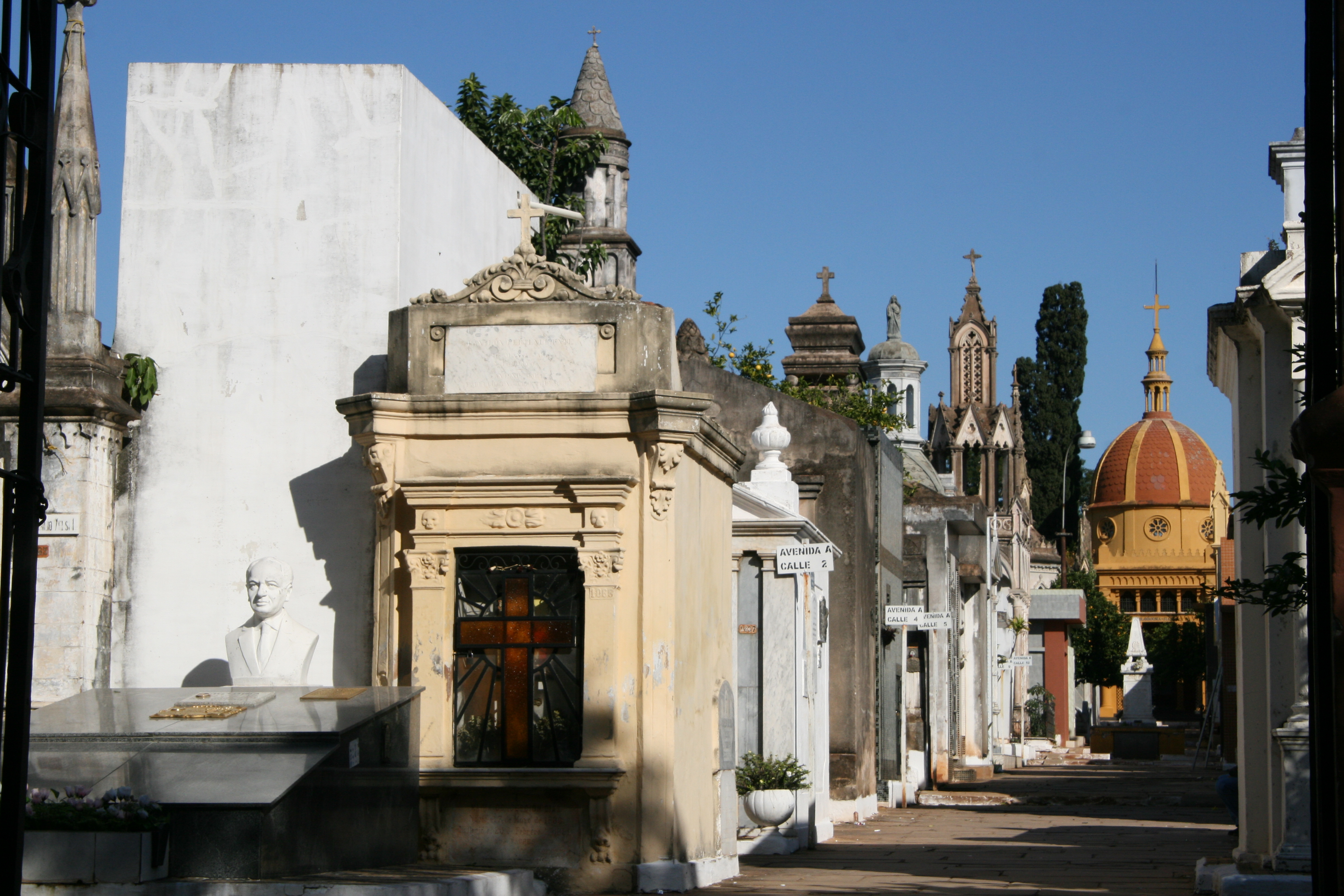

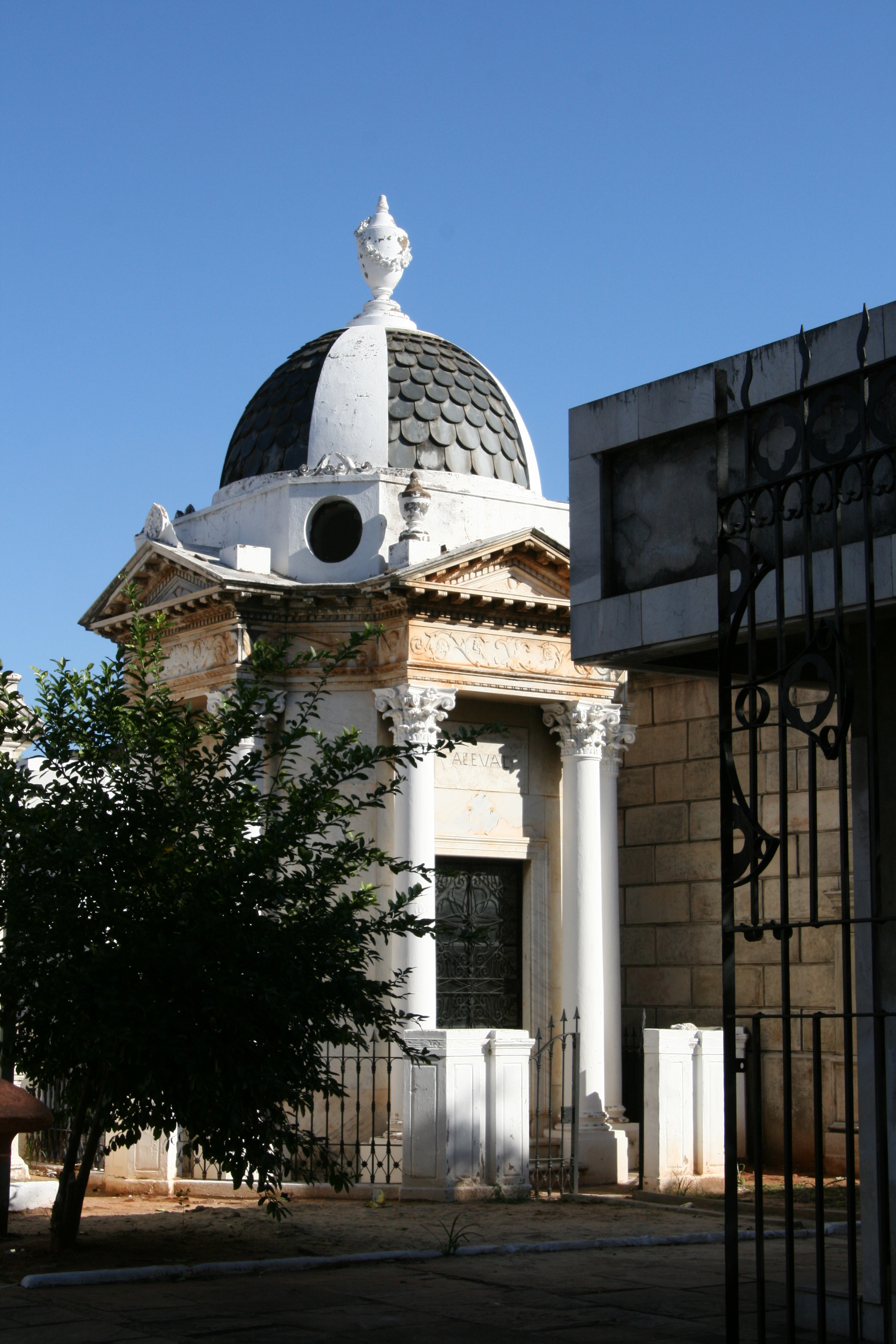

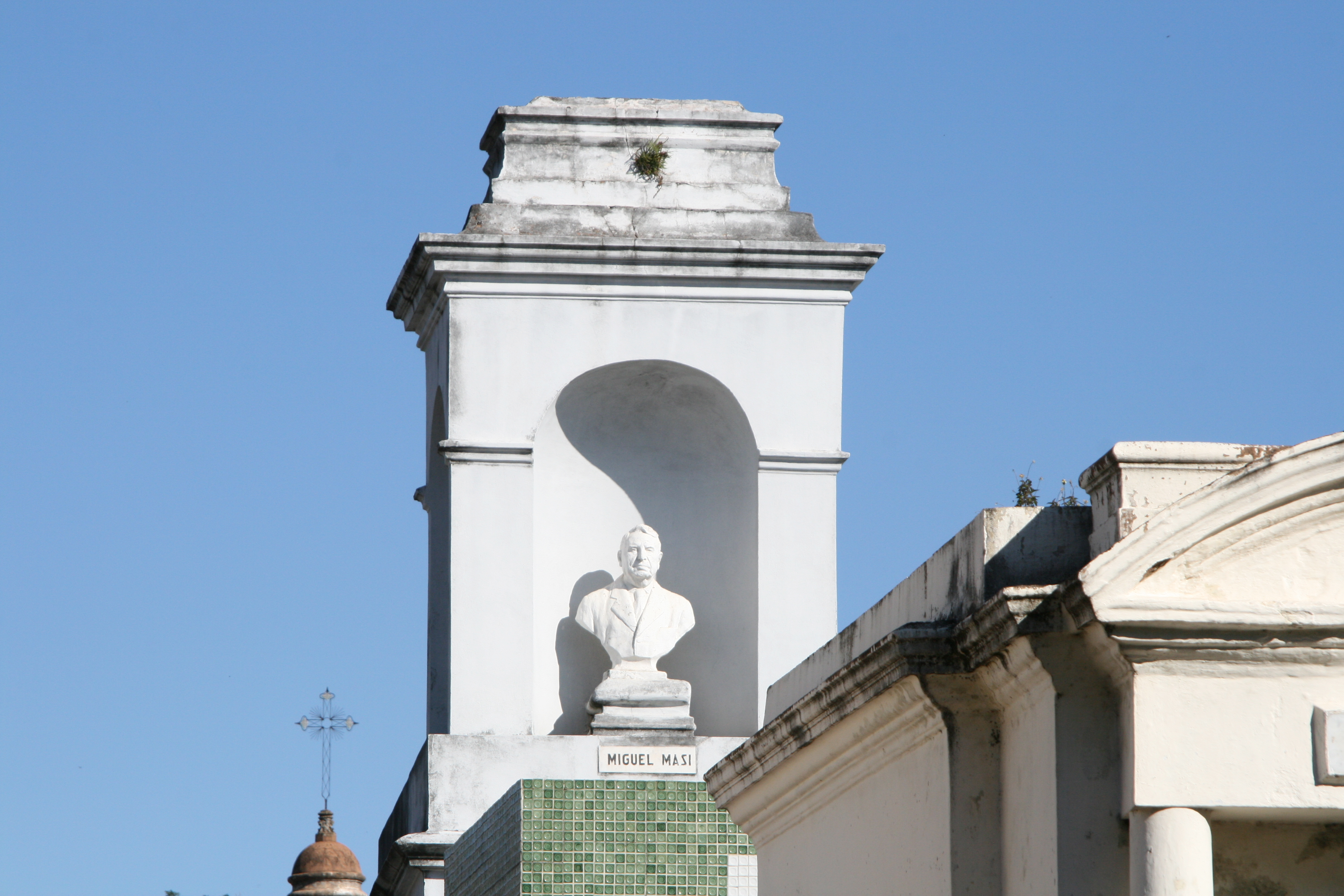

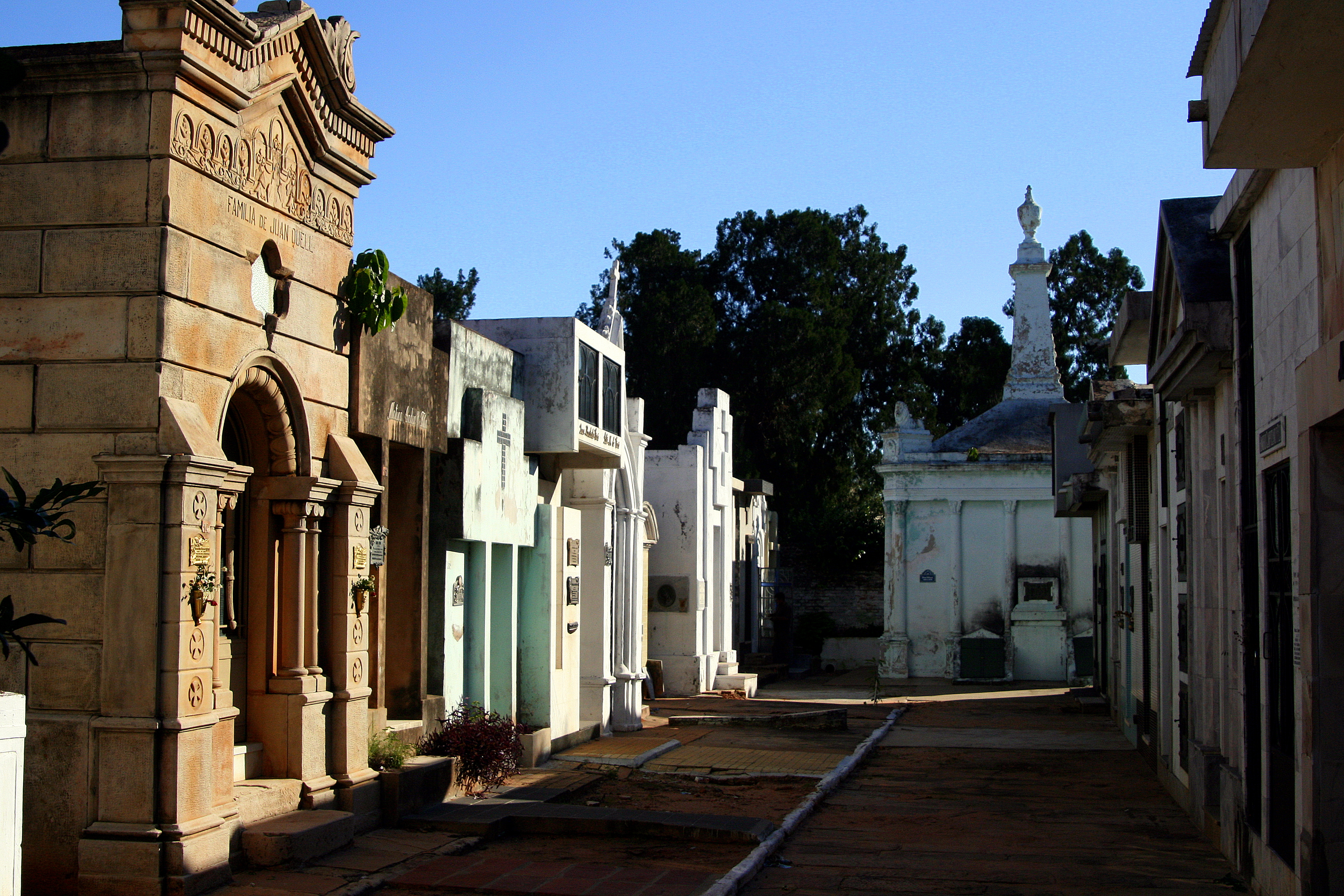

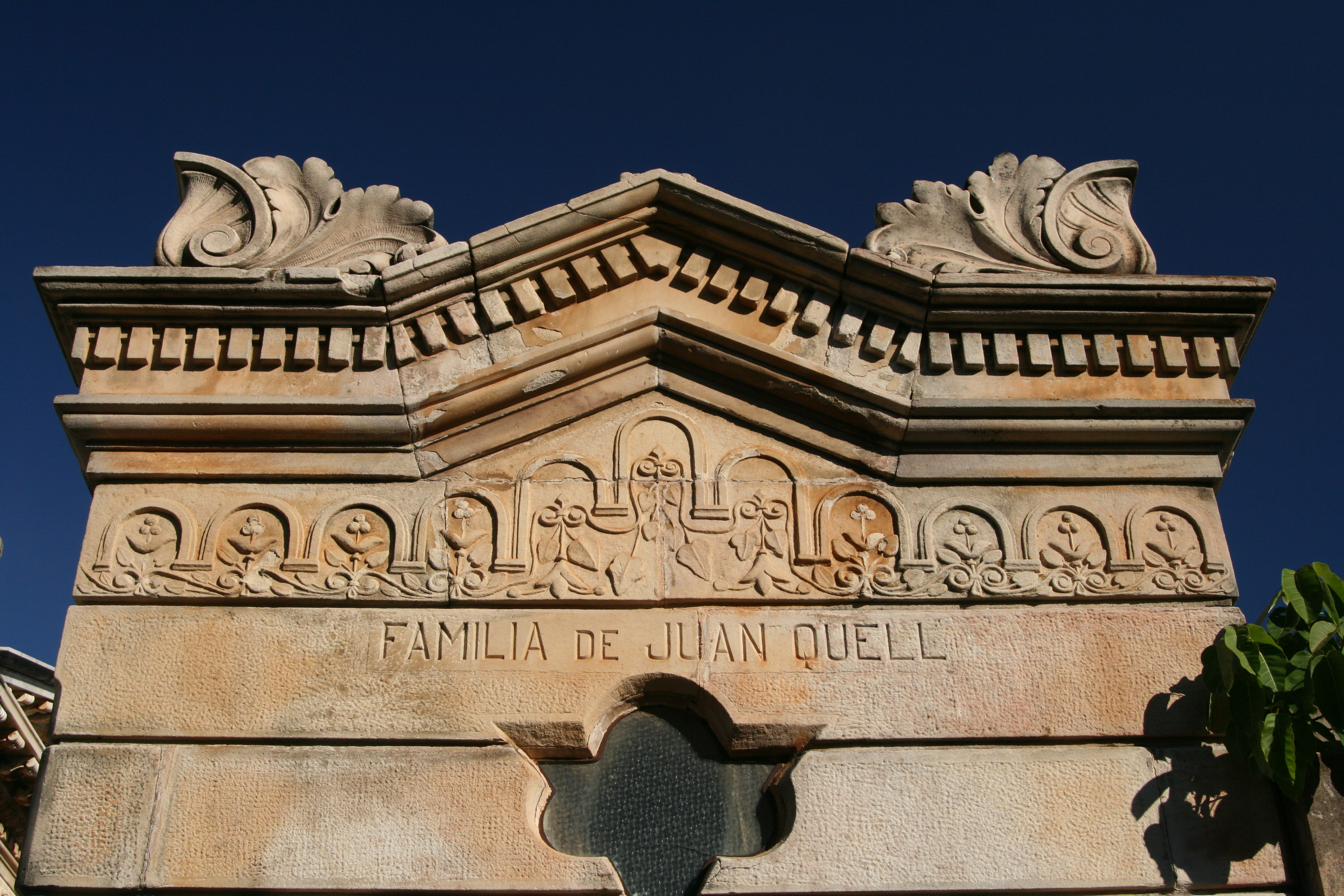

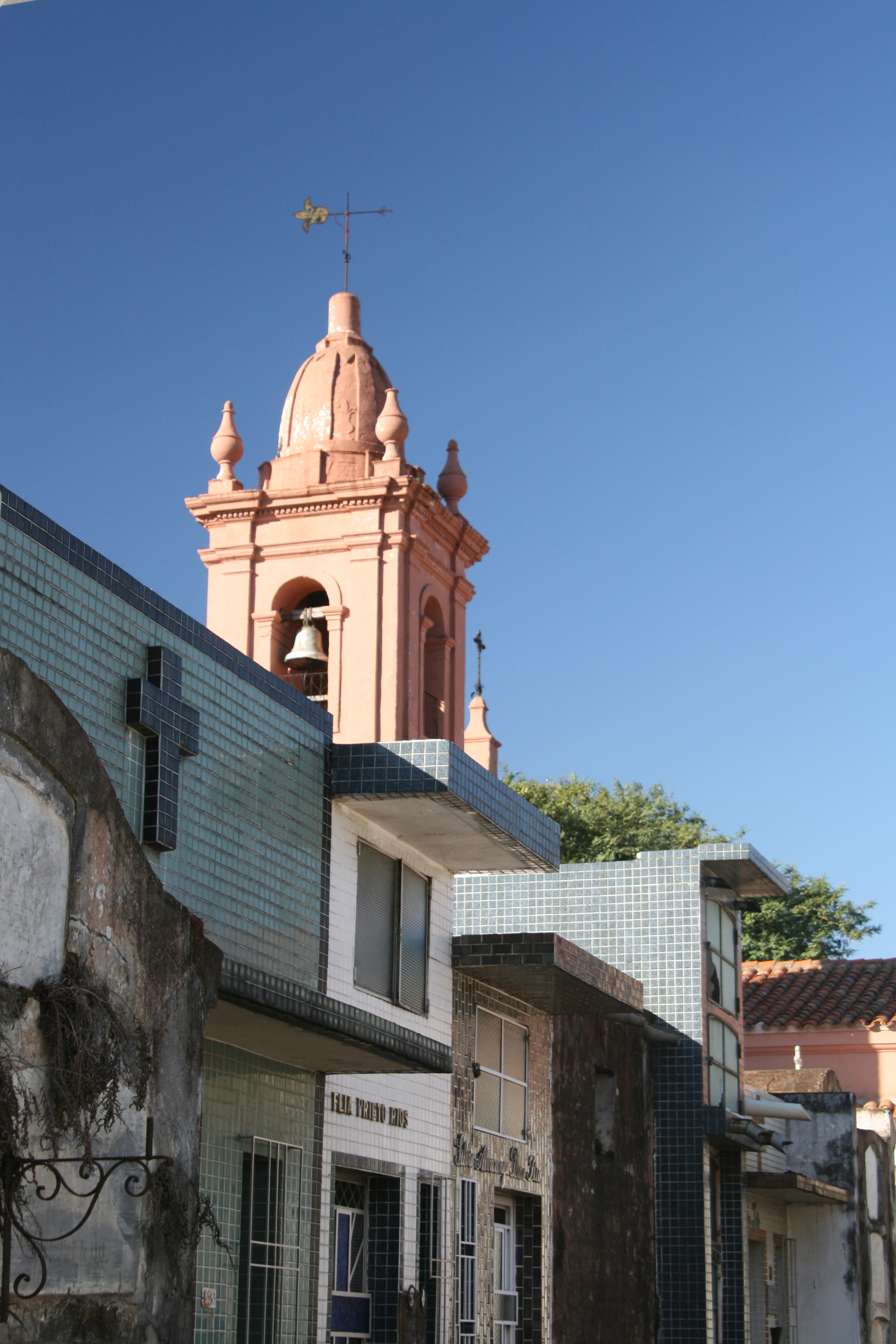

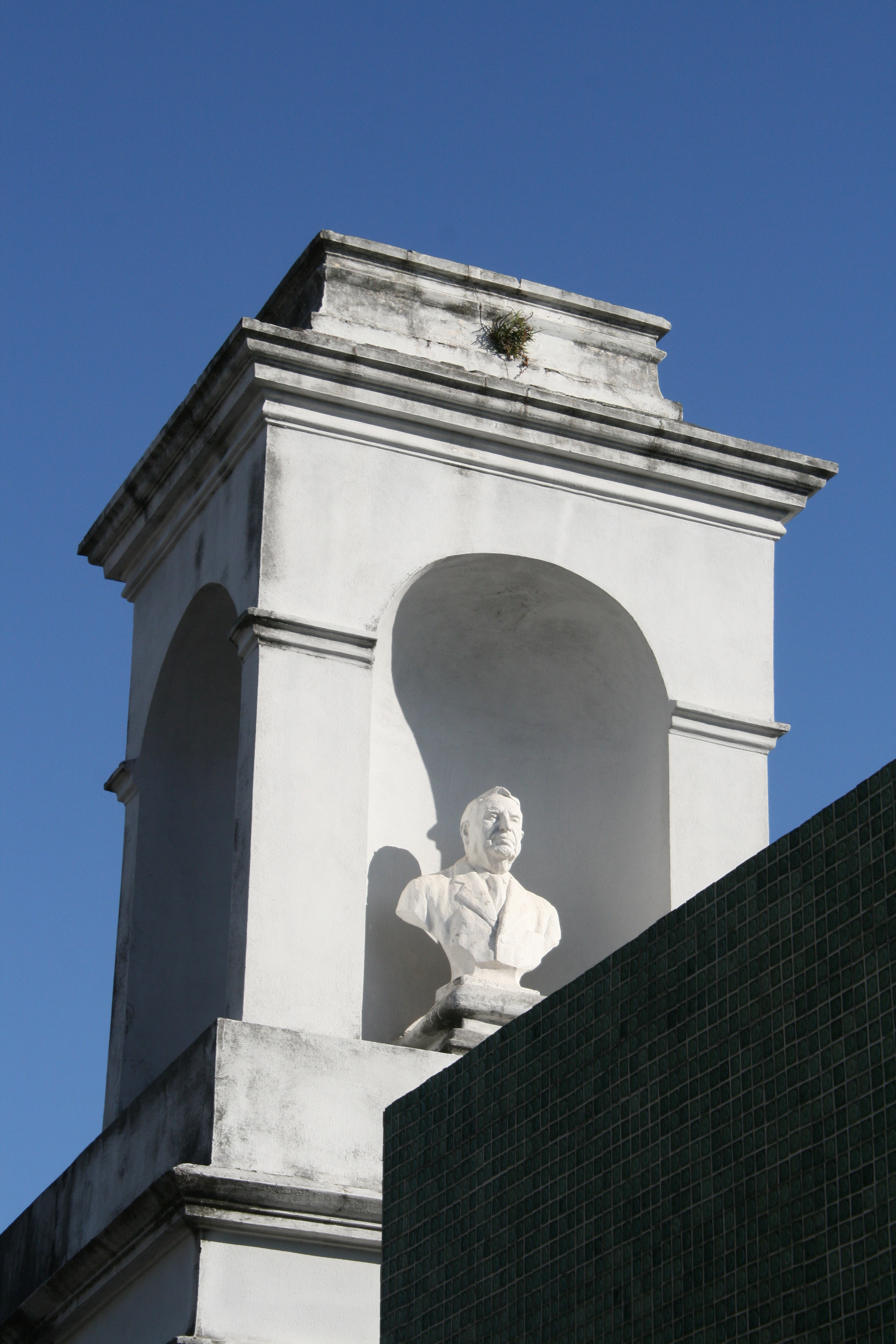

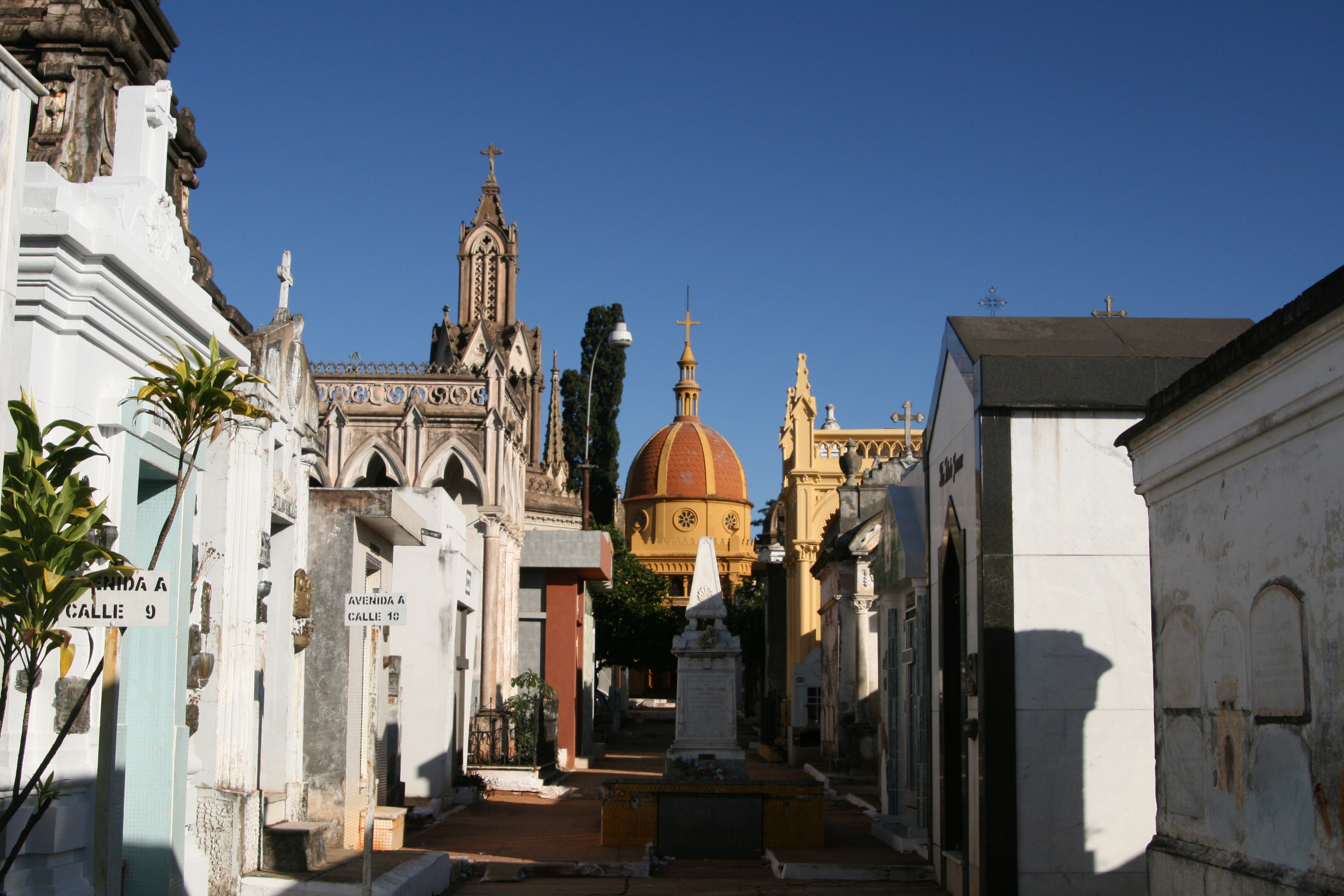

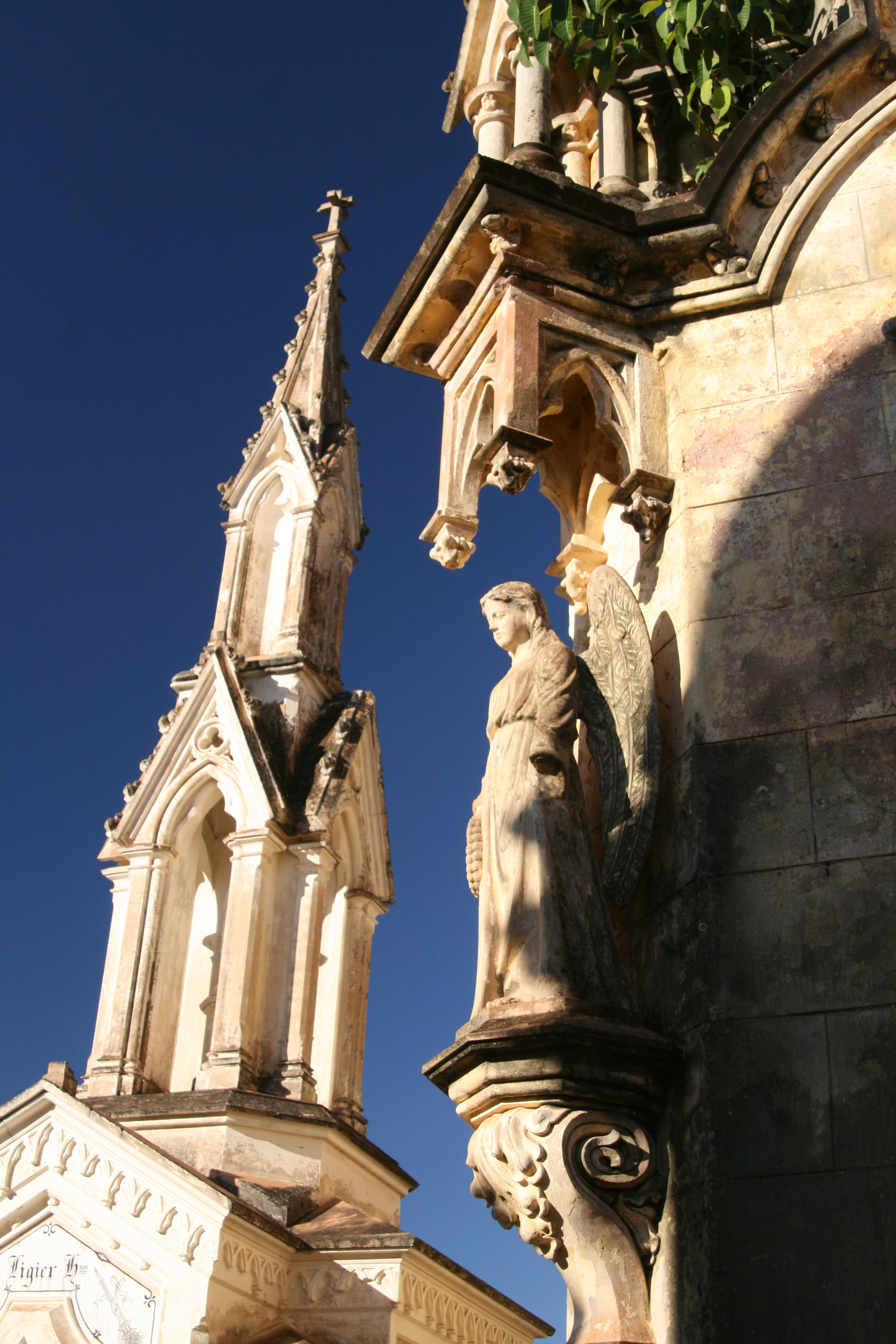

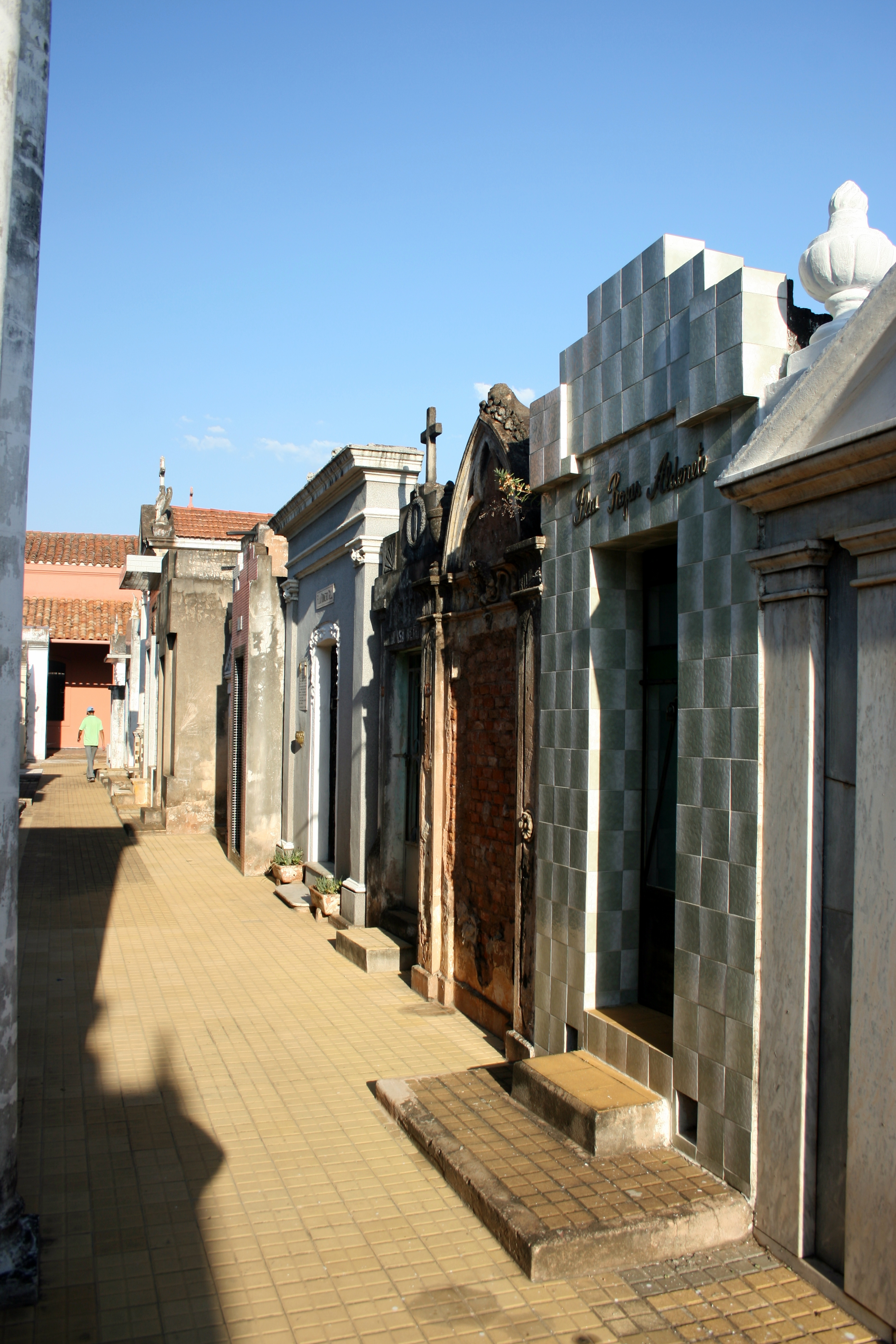

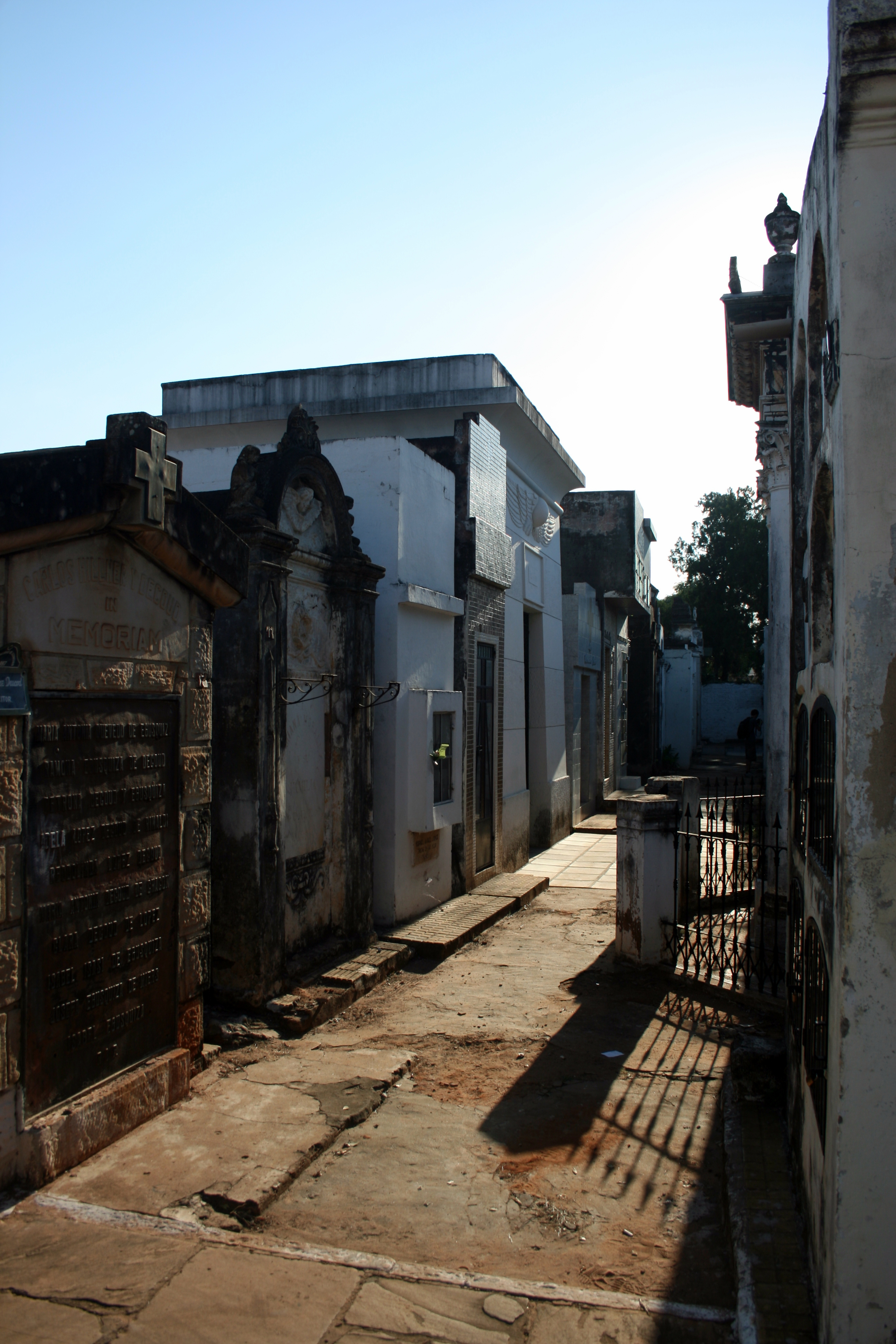

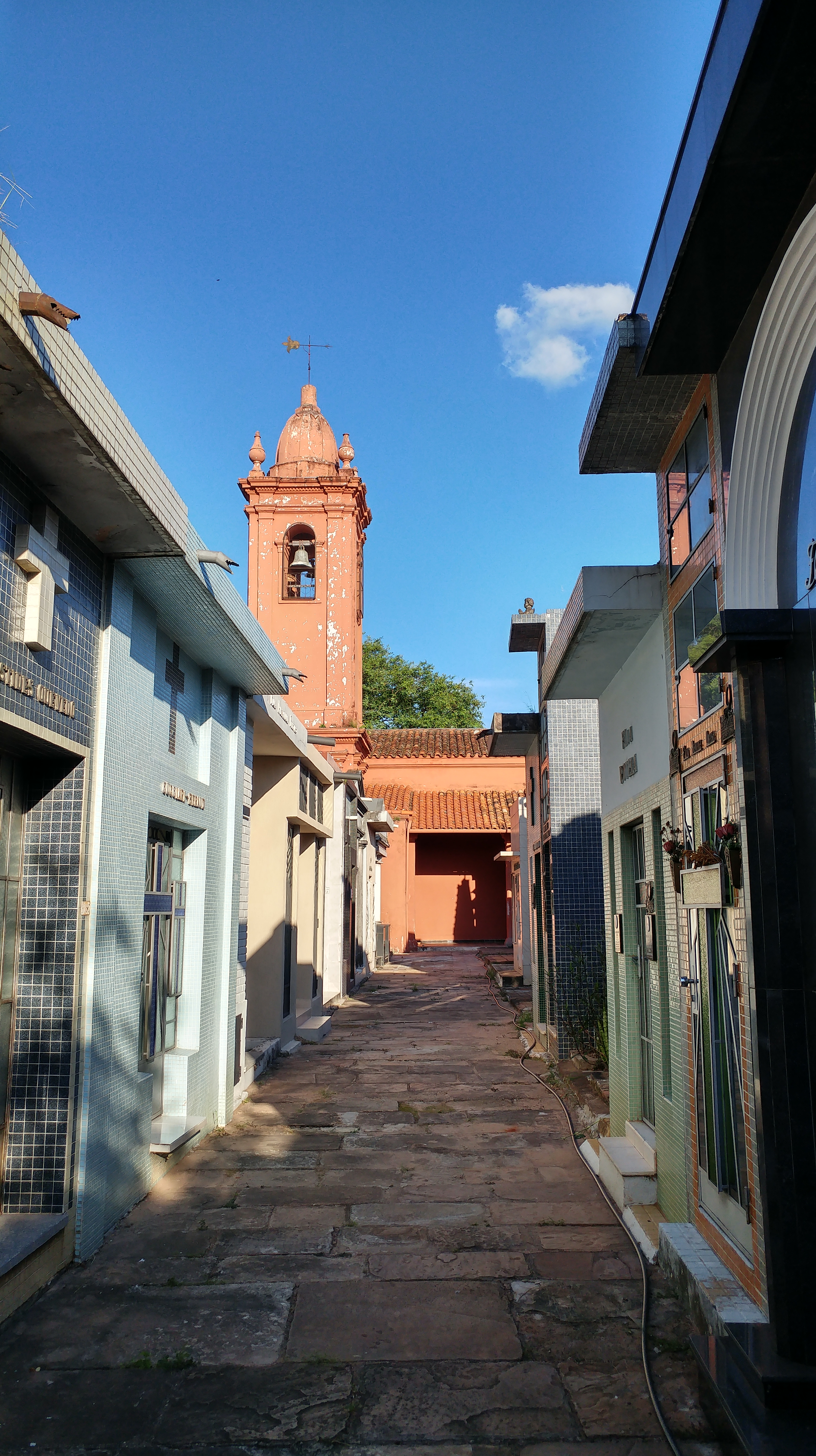

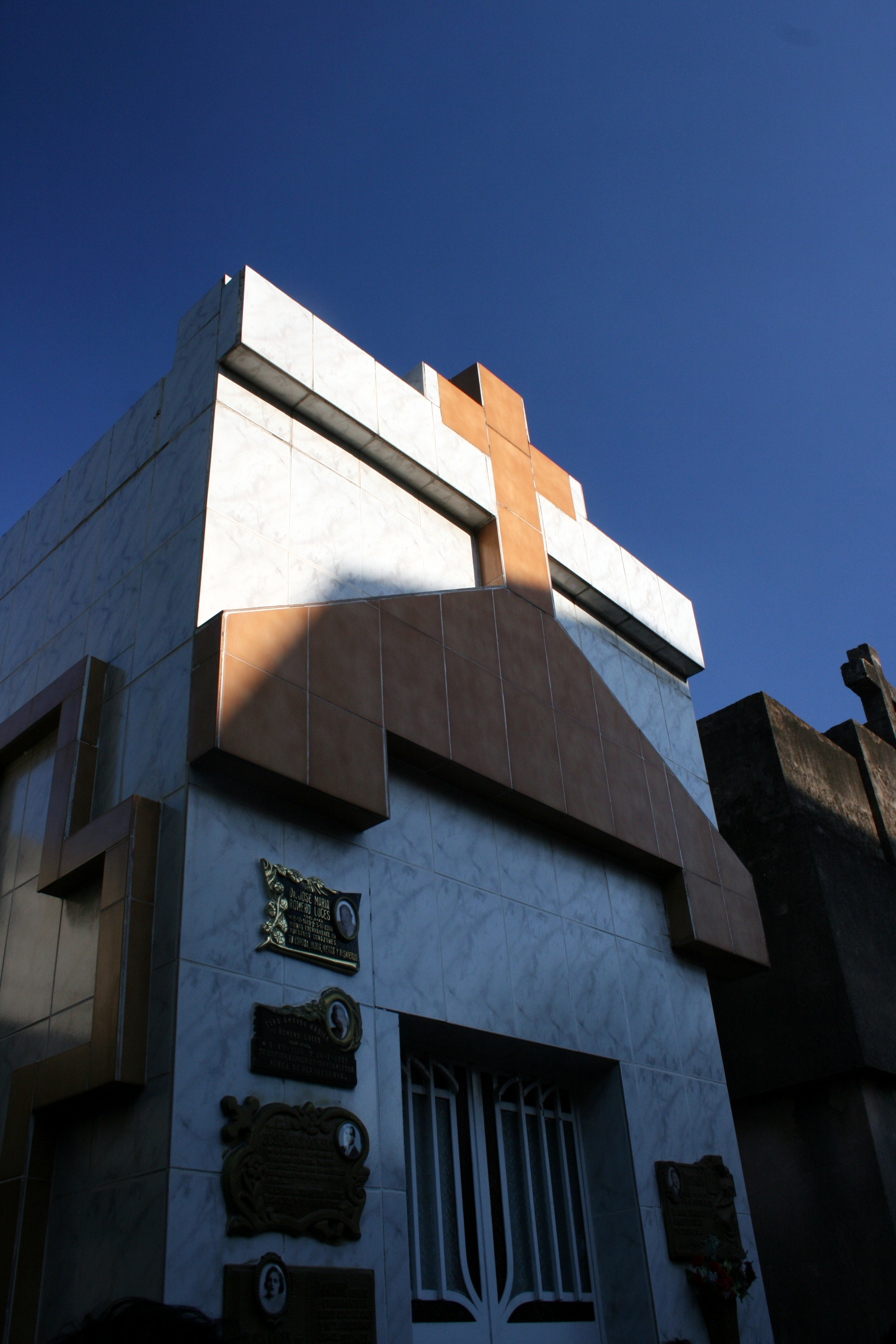

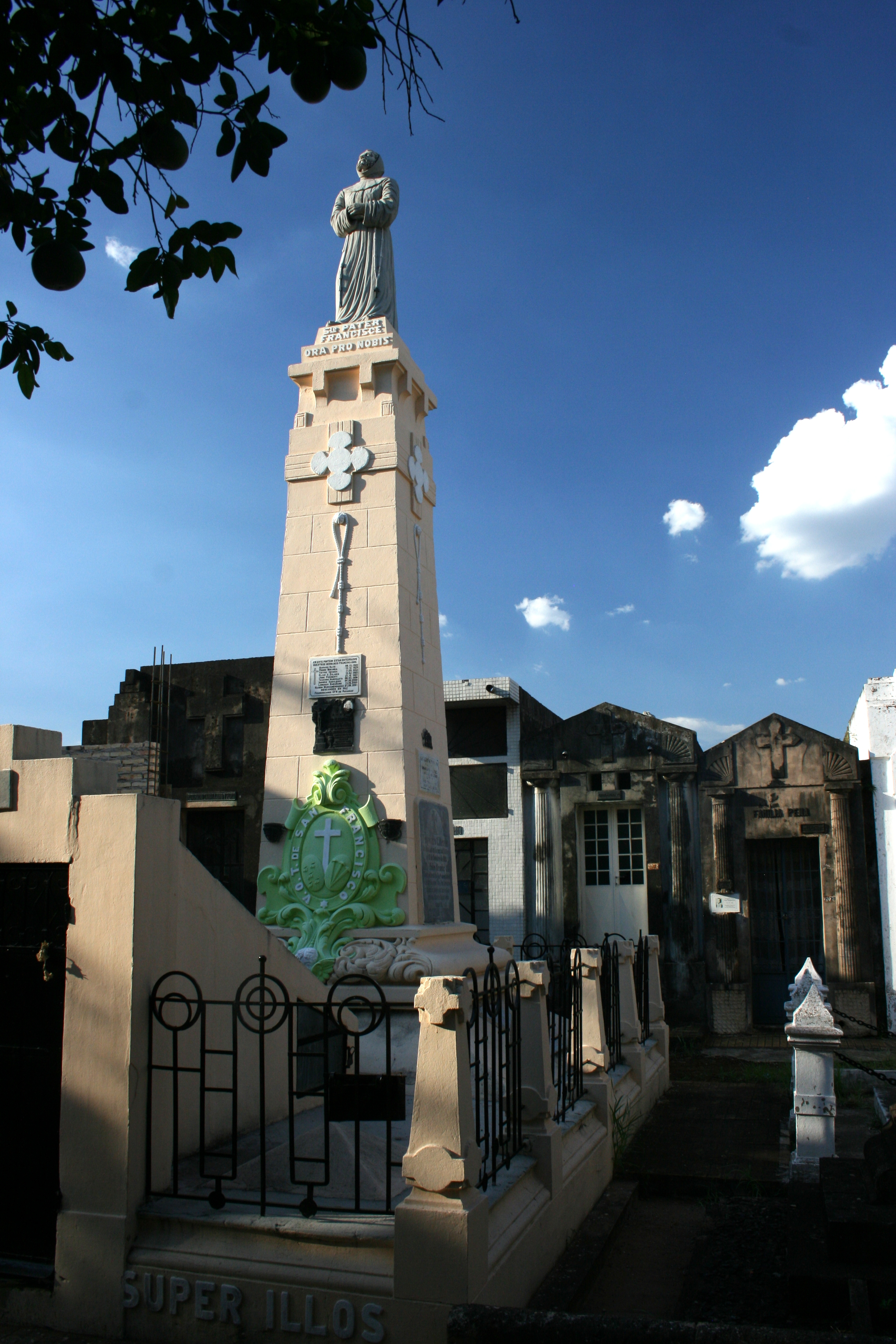

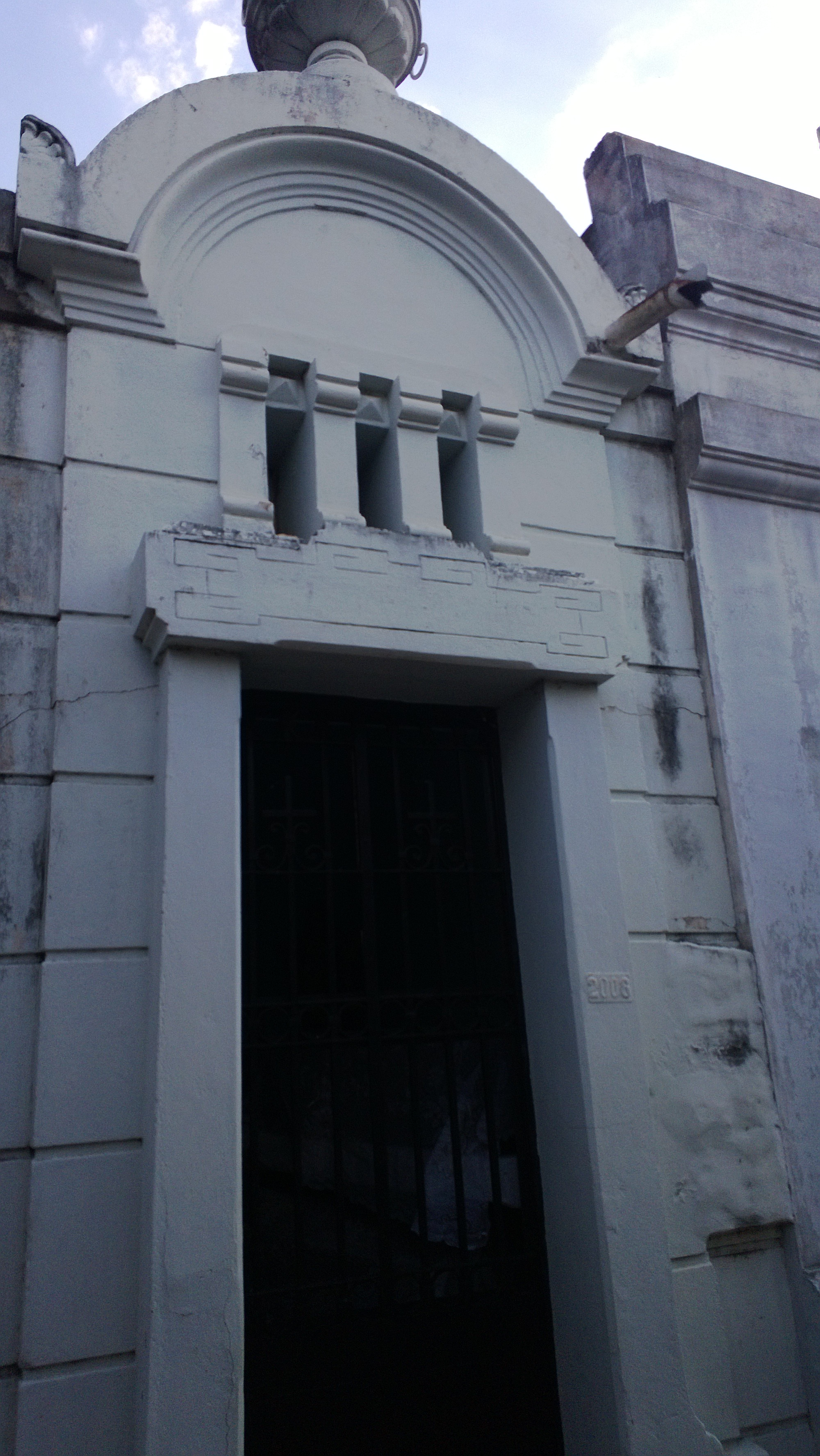

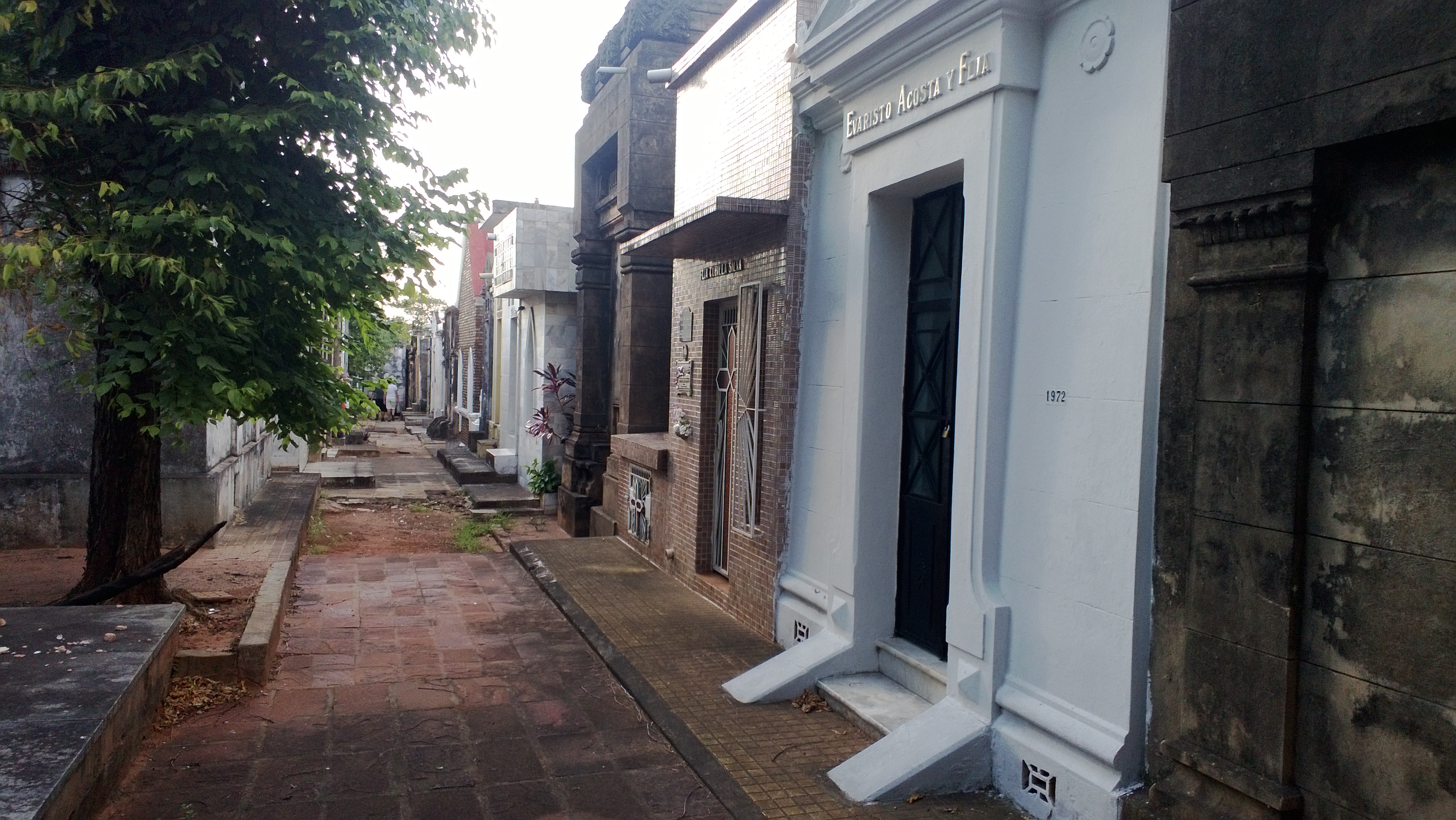

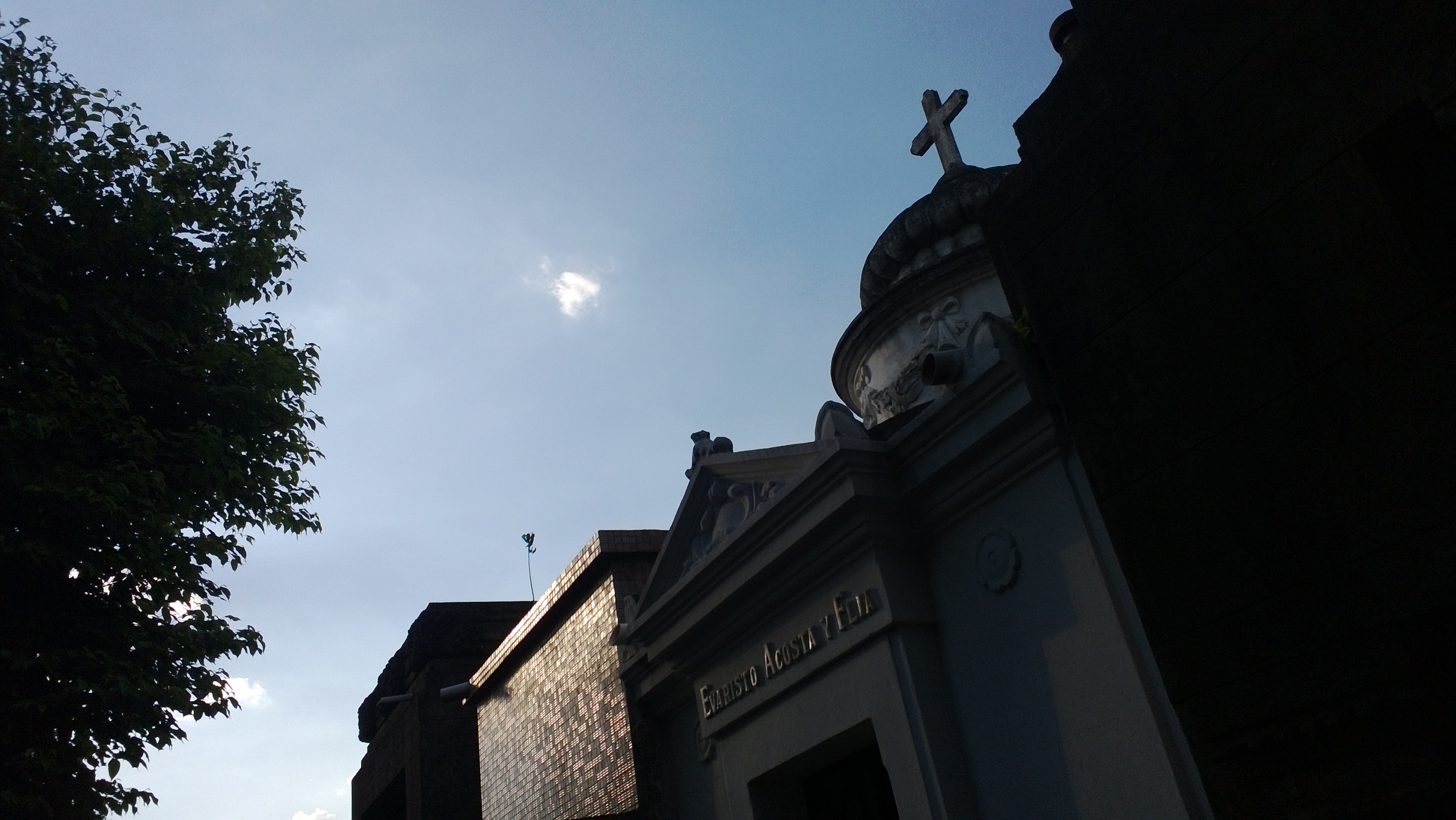
