= Recoleta =

Recoleta may refer to:

- Recoleta, Buenos Aires, suburb of Buenos Aires, Argentina
  - La Recoleta Cemetery, cemetery in the above commune
  - Centro Cultural Recoleta, cultural centre in the above commune
- Recoleta, Asunción, neighborhood of Asunción, Paraguay
  - Recoleta Cemetery, Asuncion, cemetery in Paraguay
- Recoleta, Chile, commune in Santiago, Chile
  - Deportes Recoleta, an association football club
- Recoleta (Charlottesville, Virginia), United States, a historic home
- Recoleta, a playable character in the video game Reverse: 1999

== See also ==
- Colegio Sagrados Corazones Recoleta, a school in Peru
- Iglesia de la Recoleta (Peru), in Cuzco
- Deportivo Recoleta, a football club of Asunción (Paraguay)
