= 1953 Paraguayan general election =

- 15 February 1953
- Presidential election
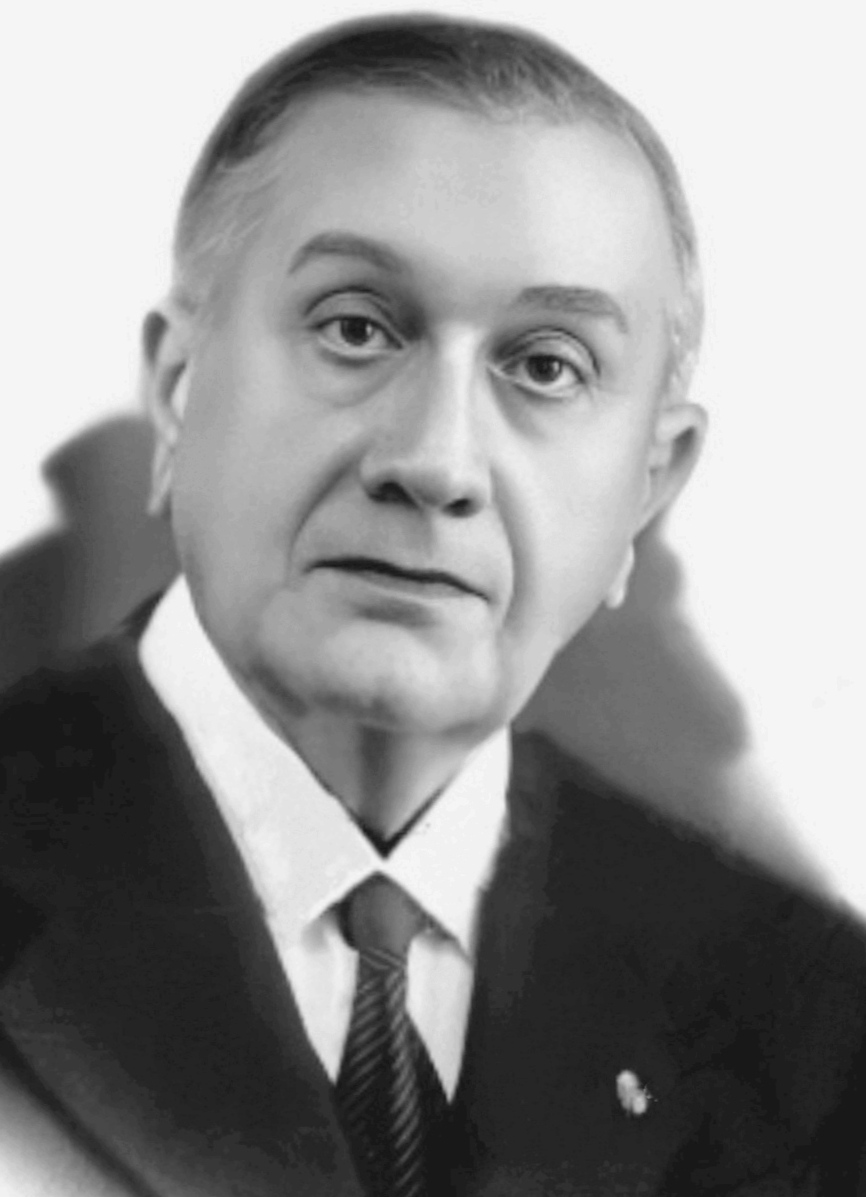
Candidate	Federico Chaves
Party	Colorado
Popular vote	224,788
Percentage	100%
- Results by department
President before election
Federico Chaves
Colorado
Elected President
Federico Chaves
Colorado
- Parliamentary election
- 53 seats in the Chamber of Deputies
Party	Leader	Vote %	Seats	+/–
Colorado	Federico Chaves	100.0	53	+4
This lists parties that won seats. See the complete results below.

General elections were held in Paraguay on 15 February 1953. At the time, the Colorado Party was the only legally permitted party. As such, incumbent president candidate Federico Chaves was re-elected unopposed.

Chaves would only stay in office for a little over a year before he was overthrown in a May 1954 coup led by General Alfredo Stroessner, who was elected his successor in a special election in July.

== Results ==
Candidate	Party	Votes	%
Federico Chaves	Colorado Party	224,788	100.00
Total		224,788	100.00
Valid votes		224,788	94.83
Invalid/blank votes		12,261	5.17
Total votes		237,049	100.00
Source: Nohlen
