= Roberto Pettit =

Roberto L. Pettit (1922–1954) was a Paraguayan medical doctor, former head of Paraguay's Institute of Agrarian Reform, and one-time leader of the youth wing of the Colorado Party. He was appointed chief of police by Federico Chávez and was killed during the attack on police headquarters during the 1954 Paraguayan coup d'etat. The neighborhood Roberto L. Pettit is named after him.
