= Roberto L. Pettit (neighborhood) =

Coordinates: 25.3108°S 57.6428°W

- Barrio
- Interactive map of Roberto L. Pettit
- Country: Paraguay
- City: Asunción
- District: La Catedral

Area
  - Total: 2.1 km^{2} (0.81 sq mi)
- Elevation: 43 m (141 ft)

Population
  - Total: 25,360
  - Rank: 2nd

Roberto L. Pettit is a neighbourhood (barrio) of Asunción, Paraguay. It is named after Roberto Pettit.

== Boundaries ==
Roberto L Pettit is bounded by Santa Ana to the south, Republicano to the east, Obrero to the north, and Tacumbu to the west.
