= Marcial Samaniego =

Marcial Samaniego López
- Samaniego in military dress
- Born: September 10, 1910; Antequera District, Paraguay
- Military career
- Allegiance: Paraguay
- Rank: General
- Conflicts: Chaco War; 1954 Paraguayan coup d'état
- Awards: Cross of the Chaco

Marcial Samaniego López (born September 10, 1910; date of death uncertain) was a Paraguayan general, author, and government official. He served in President Alfredo Stroessner's government when Stroessner took office following a 1954 coup d'etat, and continued in various ministerial roles into the 1980s.

== Early life and education ==
Samaniego was born in San Pedro Department, Paraguay, to Juan Alberto Samaniego and his wife, Maria de los Santos López. He entered the Paraguayan Army as a cadet in 1929 and trained as a military engineer.

== Career ==
Samaniego served during the Chaco War and was later director of Paraguay's Francisco López Military College.

He was one of Alfredo Stroessner's most loyal supporters and helped Stroessner overthrow the government during the 1954 coup d'etat. He was minister of public works from 1954 to 1956, when he was elevated to minister of defense, serving in that post until 1962 when he was returned to the ministry of public works. In 1975 he was again made minister of defense, holding the office until 1983. Samaniego also served as minister of education. After an unsuccessful putsch against President Alfredo Stroessner by Epifanio Méndez Fleitas in 1955, Samaniego was temporarily placed in command of the army's rebellious cavalry division as a stabilizing measure.

=== Indigenous people ===
Samaniego was noted for his fascination with the religions of Paraguay's indigenous people, published several scholarly articles on the Guaraní people, and is credited with convincing the government to award 13,000 hectares of land to protect the Pai Tavytera, the first instance of official support for native land rights in Paraguay. However, he was also criticized for endorsing Vicente Pistilli's book Vikings in Paraguay, which made a controversial historical case for early Nordic settlement in the country and which some have alleged guided the government's discriminatory policies against the Aché.

== Legacy ==
A high school in Concepción, Paraguay, is named Colegio Nacional Gral. Marcial Samaniego. A Paraguayan highway is named Avenida General Marcial Samaniego.

== Personal life ==
Samaniego's son graduated from the United States Military Academy at West Point and was later head of the National Anti-Drug Secretariat during the presidency of Andrés Rodríguez.

== Bibliography ==
- The Chaco War (1982)
