= 1954 Paraguayan presidential election =

Election of Alfredo Stroessner as President of Paraguay

1954 Paraguayan general election
- 11 July 1954
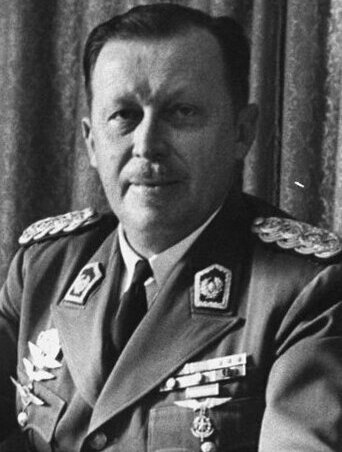
Candidate	Alfredo Stroessner
Party	Colorado
Popular vote	236,191
Percentage	100%
President before election
Tomás Romero Pereira (interim)
Colorado
President-elect
Alfredo Stroessner
Colorado

Presidential elections were held in Paraguay on 11 July 1954, following a military coup on 8 May 1954 which toppled Federico Chávez who had been re-elected the previous year. At the time, the Colorado Party was the only legally permitted party. Alfredo Stroessner, who had led the coup, ran as the Colorado candidate in a special election for the remainder of Chávez' term, and was elected unopposed.

This was the first of Stroessner's eight consecutive election victories.

== Results ==
Candidate	Party	Votes	%
Alfredo Stroessner	Colorado Party	236,191	100.00
Total		236,191	100.00
Valid votes		236,191	98.42
Invalid/blank votes		3,787	1.58
Total votes		239,978	100.00
Source: Nohlen
