= Mar. Francisco Solano López Military Academy =

Service academy in Capiatá, Paraguay

- Academia Militar Mcal. Francisco Solano López
- Cadets at the Francisco López Military Academy pictured in 2015
- Type: service academy
- Established: 1915
- Location: Capiatá, Paraguay; 25°21′30.2″S 57°25′41.2″W
- Language: Spanish
- Official march: Radetzky March

The Mar. Francisco Solano López Military Academy (officially, the Marshal Francisco Solano López Military Academy; Spanish: Academia Militar Mariscal Francisco Solano López) is a service academy in Capiatá, Paraguay.

== History ==
The school was established in 1915 and was renamed in honor of Francisco Solano López in 1948 as the Marshal Francisco Solano López Military College. During the 1954 Paraguayan coup d'etat, President Federico Chávez initially sought refuge at the college, however, was arrested by its then-director, Marcial Samaniego. In 1995 it was redesignated the Marshal Francisco Solano López Military Academy and, in 2002, women were admitted for the first time.

== Organization ==
The Francisco López Military Academy is a tri-service school responsible for training and commissioning officers of the Paraguayan Army, Navy, and Air Force.

Admission to the academy is competitive; in 2012 there were 312 applicants for 110 spaces. Candidates are evaluated on a series of physical, medical, psychological, and academic examinations.

== Notable alumni ==
- Alfredo Stroessner

== See also ==
- Colegio Militar de la Nación (Argentina)
- United States Military Academy at West Point
