= Itá Enramada =

- Barrio
- Interactive map of Itá Enramada
- Coordinates: 25°21′22″S 57°38′24″W
- Country: Paraguay
- Autonomous Capital District: Gran Asunción
- City: Asunción

Population (2002)
  - Total: 4,845

Itá Enramada is the southernmost neighbourhood (barrio) of Asunción, Paraguay. It borders the Paraguay River to the west and south, the city of Lambaré to the east and Santa Ana and Republicano to the north. Puerto Itá Enramada is a naval port located south of the neighborhood, which currently operates a service to Puerto Pilcomayo in Argentina. The Paraguayan Association of Fish and Game (APCP), has a club dedicated to fishing and hunting, which organizes fishing tournaments. There is also a German brewery here and the casino re-opened in Itá Enramada in 1975.
