= María Odulia Nicola Ruotti =

Background information
- Also known as: Chinita de Nicola
- Born: 5 September 1922; Asunción
- Died: 9 February 2006 (aged 83)
- Genres: Folk
- Occupations: Singer; Composer
- Labels: Odeón, Buenos Aires

María Odulia Nicola Ruotti, also known as Chinita de Nicola (5 September 1922 - 9 February 2006), was a singer and composer from Paraguay who was blind from a young age.

== Biography ==
Ruotti was born in Asunción on 5 September 1922. Blind from a young age due to medical negligence, she did not let it be an obstacle to success. She won her first award from El Pais Radio aged 15; by the age of 17 was acting in radio plays. In 1944 she was awarded a scholarship by the government of General Higinio Morínigo which enabled her to study vocal performance in Buenos Aires.

== Career ==
In 1948 she returned to Asunción and joined several musical ensembles, including that of Virgilio Centurión. In the 1950s she composed over one hundred popular songs, in writing partnerships with Cirilio R Zayas and Brugada Guanes. One of these collaborations was the song Extraña mujer, which was the theme to the Argentine film El Trueno Entre Las Hojas and was sung by Martín Leguizamón. She also recorded music with the harpist Tito Olmedo.

As a singer, Ruotti composed four albums which were released under the Odeón label from Buenos Aires. She performed at the National Folk Music Festival in 1970. She was one of Paraguay's best-known folk musicians.

== Death ==
Ruotti died on 9 February 2006 and was buried on 11 February 2006 in La Recoleta Cemetery, under the Associated Paraguayan Authors Pantheon.
