= Lorenzo Álvarez Florentín =

Lorenzo Álvarez
- Born: Lorenzo Álvarez Florentín; August 10, 1926; San Cosme y Damián, Paraguay
- Died: July 9, 2014 (aged 87) Asunción, Paraguay
- Genres: Paraguayan music
- Occupations: Violinist, Musician.

Lorenzo Álvarez Florentín (August 10, 1926 – July 9, 2014) was a Paraguayan composer and violinist.

He was known for compositions such as "Soul and Violin", "Night Whistle", "Go Albirroja Go" - the most popular song dedicated to the Paraguayan football team - and several symphonic poems. In addition to his musical career, he took a Bachelor's degree in journalism at the National University of Asunción. He has now been playing the violin professionally for about seventy years.

His parents were Turiano Álvarez and Ramona Florentín.

== Childhood and Youth ==
His musical bent was evident to his parents at an early stage, since at the age of 8 he had already made himself a violin and taught himself to play it.

The young Lorenzo soon decided that he wanted to become a musician, as music was a passion for him and he was aware of his talent for the violin. At the age of 11 he moved to the departmental capital, Encarnación, to begin his musical studies in a culturally important centre under teachers who would help him to improve himself.

It was the Molinas brothers who gave him the first impulse in the field of musical studies. He made his debut as a musician as a member of their band.

== Career ==
He stayed for more than a decade in the region where he was born, and then in 1950 he moved to Asunción to try for success there, offering his talent as a violinist in any band that needed his skills while he was completing his higher-level studies with the most recognized and renowned teachers.

In 1952, Leonardo Alarcón formed a big band that bore his name and invited Lorenzo to be one of its members. Alarcón was a musician and composer, trumpeter in the Band of Police Musicians of the capital, and a former pupil of Salvador Déntice. From then on the young Lorenzo Álvarez had the opportunity to work professionally with true musical artists.

After staying for a year in Alarcón's ensemble, Álvarez took an important step in his career when the renowned composer and conductor Florentín Giménez invited him to be first violin in his "Traditional and Modern" group, which in the mid-fifties had a reputation hard to match. Its 14 members included well-known figures such as Oscar Escobar, Carlos Centurion, Juan Carlos Miranda, and Jorge Alonso, and the group performed at the most important social events throughout Paraguay.

His priorities for continuing his musical education included improvements in his violin playing and studies of theory and sight-reading. He studied under Alfredo Kamprad at the Normal School of Music, where in 1955 he was appointed senior teacher of violin. He studied theory and sight-reading with Rodolfo Bagnati and harmony with Juan Carlos Moreno González, and a year later he completed his training studying composition with Florentín Giménez. In 1959 he won first prize in a composition contest organized by the Municipality of Asunción.

In the early 1960s Álvarez started the "International Rhythm Band", refreshing the Paraguayan dance repertoire with selections of polkas and foreign hits over more than a decade.

== New directions ==
For several decades he concentrated on violin performance, joining well-known bands and later directing bands of his own. Then in 1970 he reduced his professional playing in order to deepen his violin studies and expand his knowledge of harmony and composition. He remained as a performer in the Symphony Orchestra of the City of Asunción (OSCA), of which he had been a member since its beginning in 1957, and stayed on until his retirement in 1992.

== His works ==
Among his most famous works are: "Soul and Violin", a joyful piece whose interpretation requires great skill in violin performance, "Night Whistle", "Sweet Melody", "Cirilo R. Zayas”, and most of all the march "La Albirroja" composed with Ángel Peralta Arellano. Other works by him include "Madrecita Mía", "Che haitéma lo mitâ", "Purahéi", "Gustaví", "Mirtha Elizabeth", "Luisito", "Maria Victoria" and "Gladys Sunilda", all with Rudi Torga, dedicated to his children, in addition to the symphonic poems: "Jasy Retâ", "Sailor on the High Seas", "Malecón del Puerto", "Journey to the Horizon", among others.

At the age of 78 he was still very active musically: at that time he was conducting the José Asunción Flores folk orchestra at the National Conservatory of Music. In this institution he was teaching the violin, and also giving special performances, either with his son Luís, with Juan Cancio Barreto or with Berta Rojas. He died of a heart attack on July 9, 2014.
