= Tomás Romero Pereira =

President Of Paraguay

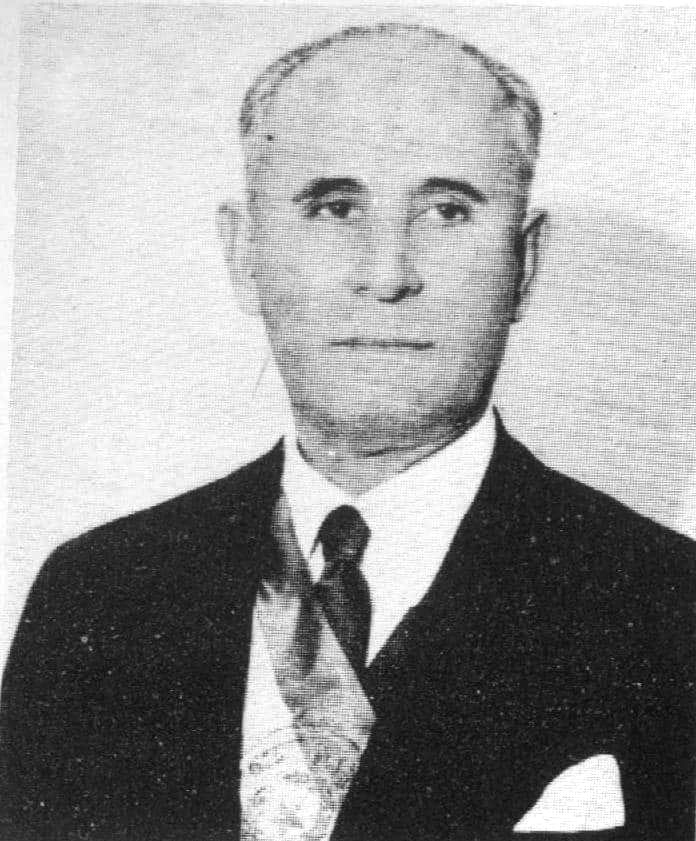
- Romero Pereira in 1954

41st President of Paraguay
- In office 4 May 1954 – 15 August 1954
- Leader: Alfredo Stroessner
- Preceded by: Federico Chaves
- Succeeded by: Alfredo Stroessner

Personal details
- Born: 4 October 1886 Encarnación, Itapúa, Paraguay
- Died: 12 August 1982 (aged 95) Asunción, Paraguay
- Spouse: Lilia Isabel Arza
- Children: 6
- Occupation: Architect; politician

Tomás Romero Pereira (4 October 1886 – 12 August 1982) was a Paraguayan architect and politician who served as President of Paraguay from May to August 1954. He was installed as president by Alfredo Stroessner after the coup of 4 May against President Federico Chaves. Romero Pereira quickly held elections, which fraudulently elected Stroessner president.

== Early life ==
Tomás Romero Pereira was born on 4 October 1886 in Encarnación, Paraguay, to Emilio Romero and Isabel Pereira. He had three sisters: Rosa Isabel, Josefa, and Sandalia; and two brothers: Emilio and Cayo.

Romero Pereira became an architect, one of the first professionally trained ones in Paraguay. One of his works is the frontispiece of the Oratory of the Virgin of the Assumption in Asunción.

He married Lilia Isabel Arza. They had five daughters: Rosa Isabel, Marta, Lilia, María Cristina and Susana; and one son: Carlos Francisco.

== Presidency (1954) ==
He was a member of the Colorado Party. He came to power as a result of a military coup, led by General Alfredo Stroessner, which began on 4 May 1954 and lasted for three days.

As a compromise between the military who led the coup and the Colorado Party who was in power, he formally took office on 8 May 1954. An election was held on 11 July 1954, with Stroessner as the sole candidate.

His Cabinet was composed of:

- Minister of the Interior: Gustavo Storm
- Minister of the Treasury: Carlos Velilla
- Minister of Education: Luis Martínez Miltos
- Minister of National Defense: Herminio Morínigo
- Minister of Foreign Relations: Hipólito Sánchez Quell
- Minister of Public Health and Social Prevision: Enrique Zacarías Arza
- Minister of Public Works and Communications: Marcial Samaniego
- Minister of Agriculture and Livestock: Alejandro Gaona
- Minister of Industry and Commerce: César Barrientos
- Minister of Justice and Work: Fabio Da Silva

On 15 August 1954, Romero Pereira handed over the presidency to Alfredo Stroessner who then became the dictator of Paraguay for 35 years. Afterwards, he held various ministerial posts under Stroessner, including head of the Ministry of Internal Affairs, until in 1956 he was replaced by Edgar Ynsfrán.

== Death ==
He died on 12 August 1982 at the age of 95.

Political offices
Preceded by Federico Chávez	President of Paraguay; May 4, 1954 – August 15, 1954	Succeeded by Alfredo Stroessner
