= San Pedro del Paraná =

- Location within Paraguay
- Coordinates: 26.833°S 56.200°W
- Country: Paraguay
- Department: Itapúa
- Founded: June 29, 1789by Joaquin Alós y Bru

Government
  - Intendente Municipal: Sixto Ramón Figueredo.

Area
  - Total: 1.421 km^{2} (0.549 sq mi)

Population (2002 Census)
  - Total: 5,328
  - Density: 39.43/km^{2} (102.1/sq mi)
- Time zone: -4 Gmt
- Postal code: 6700
- Area code: (595) (742)

San Pedro del Paraná is a town in the Itapúa department of Paraguay.

This town is 360 km away from the country's capital Asunción by Route No. 1 Mariscal Francisco Solano López which, in turn, reaches Encarnación.

== Geography ==
The district of San Pedro del Paraná is located in the northern sector of Department of Itapúa. It has plains and hills suitable for farming and animal husbandry.

=== Limits ===
- To the north lies the Department of Caazapá, to which San Pedro del Paraná is separated by the Tebicuary River.
- Al southern districts are located Fram and La Paz.
- To the west lies the district General Artigas.
- To the east are located districts Alto Verá and Obligado.

=== Weather ===
San Pedro del Paraná is the coldest area in the country because of its location at the highest tip southern. The region lacks elevations to slow the south wind. On the other hand, it maintains constant as a large percentage of moisture. Its average temperature does not reach 21 °C and the minimum can reach -4 degrees Celsius in coastal areas of Parana. Summer temperatures rarely reach 39 °C. The average rainfall is 1,700 millimeters per year. October is the rainiest month.

=== Hydrography ===
The district of San Pedro del Paraná is watered by the Tebicuary River and the following streams:

- Arroyo Itá.
- Arroyo Tacuaru mi
- Arroyo Frazada
- Arroyo Benítez.
- Arroyo Poramoco
- Arroyo Tacuatí.

== Demographics ==
Aspects of the population in the district of San Pedro del Paraná.

- Population Less than 15 years, 42.1%.
- Average number of children per woman, 3.5 children.
- Percentage of illiterates in the district, 8.0%.
- Percentage of population occupation in the primary sector, 23.6.
- Percentage of population occupation in the secondary sector, 27.6%.
- Percentage of population occupation in the tertiary sector, 47.1%.
- Percentage of population occupation in agricultural work, 22.8%.
- Percentage of homes that have electric service, 94.7%.
- Percentage of homes with running water, 33.8%.

=== Population Unsatisfied Basic Needs ===
- Percentage of people with unsatisfied basic needs in access to education, 7.9%.
- Percentage of people with unsatisfied basic needs in health infrastructure, 21.1%.
- Percentage of people with unsatisfied basic needs as housing, 31.2%.
- Percentage of people with unsatisfied basic needs in subsistence capacity, 20.1%.

== History ==
San Pedro del Paraná was founded on June 29, 1789, with the presence of the then Spanish governor Joaquin Alós y Bru. The foundation received the accompaniment of Bob chieftain, who dominated this area.

The chieftain provided food and produce while consolidating the new farms of the families who came to populate the place.

Of the remaining initial time there are many testimonies and perhaps some remnants of buildings still stand. In the downtown area, around Epifanio Mendez Fleitas square you can see interesting examples of architecture of yesteryear Paraguayan: homes with adobe walls, ceilings and palms, with openings system pitons.

There are buildings that maintain the guidelines with typical colonial corridors supported by wooden pillars. And also appear mansions facades reminiscent of the presence of Italian immigrants in place, which persisted because the owners take care of this heritage.

== An Ancient Heritage ==
The church of St. Peter the Apostle is site of worship of patron of the community. The old building underwent major expansions, retaining walls, wood and a main gate.

There are some sacred images carved with faces solemn and thoughtful, they remain as a testimony of faith of the first settlers.

In view is the Virgen del Rosario and, in a side altar, is located a set of Christ Crucified with San Juan and the Virgin of Seven Sorrows. Kept inside the temple remain the Lord of Las Palmas, San Miguel Archangel, Jesus Christ, San Pedro and other saints of Franciscan origin, which, however, many villagers attribute originated in the Holy of workshops Jesuits.

== Historic Sites ==
This district is rich in historic sites. A company called Campamento Cué reported that the place had camped the residentas during the Paraguayan War (1865–1870); came when fleeing persecution of the soldiers Brazilians.

Another version relates that there were installed the forces of General Dr. Manuel Belgrano, in their advance towards the city of Asunción, in the year 1811. Both legends testify to the nobility, the hospitality and meekness of the locals.

Isla Yobai is the place where the hostel was General José Gervasio Artigas. Around 1940, the Uruguayan priest Armando di Perna collected trophies and personal effects of eastern patriot that simple peasants had preserved with admiration.

The company Noviretá (formerly Bobiretá, in tribute to Bob chieftain) lays the old rail station.

== Economy ==
The population of San Pedro del Paraná is devoted mostly to agriculture. They grow cotton, sesame, soy, corn, and manioc.

Among professionals in the district are civil servants, teachers and a few artisans who work the fabric of ao po'i and other embroidery.

== Ways and Means of Communication ==
For the District of San Pedro del Paraná, the most important way of communication is route No. 8, which is totally paved in this area.

This district has 74 companies and 12 settlements with more than 500 km of roads.

The two main streets of San Pedro del Paraná are Captain Nicanor Torales and Captain Fulgencio Leguizamón. The streets are cobbled, like some cross, a total of 6 blocks.

The internal roads and embankments facilitate the intercom of the districts and transit flow of people and cargo.

There are modern bus transportation for the relocation of villagers to the capital, the departmental capital and other parts of the country.

== Health and education ==
This village, located in Department of Itapúa, has provided electricity services since 1984. It has a hospital district.

There are 4 elementary schools: Enrique Solano López, Parroquial San Juan Bosco, San Miguel and Juan Javier Romero.

At the secondary level: National School Capitán Nicanor Torales and Agricultural College.

There are two stations:

- Community Radio Tavañe'e.
- Radio San Pedro.

The Catholic University offers careers as History, Mathematics and Accountants. They are also empowered subsidiaries of the Polytechnic University of Paraguay and artists and the UTCD.

The Centro Social Alicia Elisa Lynch, founded in 1953, gathers the society of San Pedro del Paraná.

== Notable people ==
San Pedro del Paraná is the birthplace of poet, musician and political Paraguayan Epifanio Mendez Fleitas, who left deep scars on their way through life. Passionate about politics, came to occupy positions of public importance.

Mendez Fleitas was also a great poet and composer. Some of his musical works were Serenata, Che Jazmín and Che mbo'eharépe.

Gregorio Cabrera was born here too. In this district was born the current elected president, Fernando Lugo whose period will be until 2013.

== City Hall ==
At present, its mayor is Mr. Sixto Ramon Figueredo from the PLRA party for the period 2006 to 2010.

== Surface ==
The District of San Pedro del Paraná covers an area of 1,421 km^{2} of territorial extension, with a total population by the year 2008 of 34,742 inhabitants.

Its population density is 39.43 inhabitants. / km^{2}

== Population ==
According to data provided by the Directorate General of Census and Statistics Survey, the District of San Pedro del Paraná, has the following figures:

Making a relationship with the district's total population can be seen that 81.61% of the population is settled in rural areas.

Of the total 34,742 inhabitants, the number of males was 18,286 and women's 16,456.

The activity of the settlers is purely agricultural-livestock. Small industries such as carpentry, bakery production of clothing, etc. can be found.

== Tourism ==
Among the natural attractions of the region, a place that deserves special significance is the range of San Rafael, is located where the natural reserve park of San Rafael.

This ridge is the highest point in the region and is one of the most important biodiversity reserves of Paraguay. It is the life of more than 100 endemic bird species endangered by the growing disappearance of forests.

The Tebicuary River Basin and its hundreds of streams and tributaries make up one of the fresh water reserves most important in the region.

== How to get there ==
From the Central Bus Station part Asunción daily bus companies Tebicuary and La Yuteña get to San Pedro del Paraná. There is a path without pavement linking the city with Route 1, which in turn connects with Encarnación and Asunción. From Ciudad del Este on Route 6 through Route "Graneros del Sur"passing by Guazu Ygua to San Pedro del Paraná.
