= Cirilo R. Zayas =

Paraguayan composer and writer

- Born: Cirilo R. Zayas; March 9, 1929; Asunción
- Died: September 19, 2001 (aged 72)
- Known for: Music, composer
- Notable work: Felicidades; Mi rosal de amor Soy paraguaya

Cirilo R. Zayas was a Paraguayan composer and writer. He was born in Asunción, capital of Paraguay, on March 9, 1929 to Ramón Zayas and Ramona Román. His father was a lawyer, and also a musician who played the violin, guitar and flute. Zayas died in Asunción, Paraguay on September 19, 2001.

== Beginnings ==
Cirilo R. Zayas belonged to a group of educated people, artists, journalists, professors, priests and trade unionists. His father, before going to Law and Social Sciences College, played the violin, flute and guitar. Was victim of the political fanatics of other times; "his mother, along with other brave women, by lying in the railroads, defied a convoy that transported men and weapons, in one of the many syndicate strikes of political connotation in Paraguay", explains a written preserved by Autores Paraguayos Asociados – APA -(Paraguayan Authors Association).

== Career ==
Cirilo Zayas was both a composer and lyricist. In composing "Felicidades" (Congratulations), he gave Paraguayan folkmusic a song that describes the sentiment of profound caring and respect for someone having a birthday or anniversary, giving them a message of good augurs with the sounds of a polka.

“Felicidades, bien de mi vida, que tu destino te brinde siempre felicidades" (Congratulations, good of my life, that fate gives you always happiness), when we hear this well known phrase, composed to salute someone on their birthday, we should always remember the author of this song, one of the most known, diffuse and still in force in the national repertory.

Besides developing a great artistic labor in music, another subject that he felt passionate about was writing. For many years he wrote a column about traditions and folklore of Paraguay called "Parrilla Luna y Folklore". A book with the same name was created from a compilation of these articles.

== Achievements ==
His autobiography says that he was a musical author and composer, as well as a theatre author and book writer. His songs were honored by the Autores Paraguayos Asociados (APA), Asunción's Municipality and other institutions.

He got the title of Grade Licensed in Public Relations in the Instituto Superior Internacional de Relaciones Públicas – ISIRP–(International Superior Institute of Public Relations); afterward he was professor of Public, Human and Social Affairs in almost all the institutions that taught politics in the capital of the country; he was also a scholarship student of the American States Organization, of the French Radio and television, in Paris and of the United States Workmen Central, in Virginia, New York City and Washington.

In the Centro Internacional de Estados Superiores de Periodismo para América Latina (International Center of Journalism for Latin America) he finished his career of journalism and later he was chief of the arts and shows division in different written press media in Paraguay.

He was teacher of radio journalism, literature and scripts in the Municipal School of Radio and Television Locution of Asunción, in addition, was librettist of almost every radio station in the capital and interior of the country.

With all his knowledge he was also the chief editor in the magazine of the police department of the capital and director of Culture of the Municipality in Encarnación, the Sub-Secretary of Information and Culture of the Republic's Presidency and was also Vice-President of the Autores Paraguayos Asociados (APA), as well as chief of Public Relations of the Government Delegation of Alto Paraná.

== Work ==
He wrote lyrics for great music composers such as Chinita de Nicola, Porfirio Báez, Gerardo Arroyo, Vicente Orrego Chono Duarte, Alejandro Villamayor, Lorenzo Alvarez and others.

His musical composition "Extraña mujer" written with Chinita de Nicola, was selected among many others to be included in the movie "El trueno entre las hojas", an Argentine production based on a book written for Augusto Roa Bastos.

His best known works include: Felicidades, Por tu gracia angelical, Al pensar que me querías, Ensueño de claro lunar, Mi rosal de amor, Paraguaya rohayhu, Curubica de amor, Lucero de mi camino, Por tu amor mi palomita, La morena karape, Dulce melodía, Mañanitas paraguayas, and Soy paraguaya.

He was a well known journalist and promoter of Paraguayan folklore. He was a columnist for the newspaper Ultima Hora and has published more than 150 articles that are compiled in the book “Parrilla, Luna y Folklore” (Asunción 1995).

He also started in the composition of music for zarzuelas and one of them, the Paraguayan zarzuela "Mburukuja", with music of Neneco Norton, is still popular.
