= 1954 Paraguayan coup d'état =

Military overthrow of Federico Chávez

- Part of the Cold War
Date	4 – 7 May 1954 (3 days)
Location	Asunción, Paraguay
Result	Overthrow of Federico Chávez; Alfredo Stroessner becomes president later in the year

Belligerents
Government of Paraguay	(Paraguay) Paraguayan Army; Colorado Party

Commanders and leaders
(Paraguay) Federico Chávez; Col. Néstor Ferreira; Dr. Roberto Pettit	(Paraguay) Gen. Alfredo Stroessner; Epifanio Méndez Fleitas; Gen. Marcial Samaniego; Lt. Col. Mario Ortega

Casualties and losses
- 25 killed

The 1954 Paraguayan coup d'état occurred in May 1954. It was led by Alfredo Stroessner, with the support of Epifanio Méndez Fleitas, and resulted in the overthrow of the government of Federico Chávez. The coup was the culmination of a complex series of political rivalries within the ruling Colorado Party. Approximately 25 people were killed during the putsch, which helped set the stage for the election of Stroessner as president of Paraguay later that year. He went on to serve as a dictator for 35 years before his own overthrow in 1989.

== Background ==
By the 1950s, social and political stability in Paraguay had been severely eroded due to more than two decades of crises, including the Second Paraguayan Civil War, the Chaco War, and the pro-Nazi Party sympathies of former president Higinio Morínigo. President Federico Chávez, who had declared a state of siege and initiated a crackdown against his political opponents shortly after taking office, faced an uncertain economic situation in Paraguay and turned to Central Bank president Epifanio Méndez Fleitas to spearhead a national economic recovery.

Méndez' attempts to convince Chávez to seek support from the Argentine government of Juan Perón proved unpopular with conservative elements of the Colorado Party and Méndez was pressured to resign in January 1954. Despite his departure, Méndez continued to enjoy support from some factions of the party, as well as Army Major Virgilio Candia, a deputy to cavalry commander Colonel Néstor Ferreira. Ferreira was himself a strong supporter of Chávez.

Beyond this rivalry between supporters of Chávez and the supporters of Méndez, the so-called epifanistas, a secondary rivalry had begun to develop between the government and the Army due to the decision of Chávez to outfit the National Police with heavy weaponry, which was met with the chagrin of the Army's commanding general Alfredo Stroessner.

== Coup ==
On May 3, 1954, Ferreira ordered the arrest of Candia due to suspicions of his plotting against Chávez. This provided the opportunity for Stroessner to propose an alliance between the Army and the epifanistas against the government.

The coup got underway at about 8:00 p.m. on May 4, 1954, with an attack on police headquarters in Asunción by commandos from the Paraguayan Army's elite Battalion 40 led by Mario Ortega. During the assault, the young chief of police Roberto Pettit was shot and, though he was promptly evacuated by the attacking Army forces to a hospital, died from his wounds. President Chávez initially sought refuge inside the Francisco López Military College and offered to promote its director, Marcial Samaniego, to head of the Paraguayan Army. Samaniego, however, was an old friend of Stroessner and responded to the offer by immediately arresting Chávez.

During an emergency session of the Colorado Party leadership convened on May 5, Chávez was requested to formally resign the presidency. The resignation of Chávez resulted in Colorado Party chairman Tomás Romero Pereira becoming interim president.

== Aftermath ==
The Colorado Party nominated Stroessner as their candidate for president in an election on July 11, which he won. The party saw Stroessner's presidency as a temporary solution to its internal bickering and indecision, and planned to eventually replace him. Stroessner had no base of support within the party, which was split between backers of Chávez and backers of Méndez. Over the next three years, as part of an effort to consolidate his position, Stroessner worked to sideline leaders of both factions of the party.

While Méndez was briefly reinstalled as president of the Central Bank by Stroessner, he was shortly thereafter again forced to resign. In 1955 he attempted to rally his supporters within the Army to overthrow Stroessner, but the plot failed and he was pressured to leave the country. Virgilio Candia was promoted to the post of his former boss, Néstor Ferreira, as commander of the cavalry, but also faced dismissal along with other epifanista officers. The deposed president, Chávez, was meanwhile sent to France as Paraguayan ambassador.

Lt. Colonel Mario Ortega, commander of Battalion 40, was appointed the new chief of police, the first in a long line of Army personnel to head Paraguayan law enforcement. Nestor Ferreira was briefly jailed, but later released and given command of the reserve officer corps, a post he held until his retirement. The former interim president, Romero, would serve as a cabinet minister under Stroessner, who would lead Paraguay for 34 years.

== See also ==
- 1954 Paraguayan presidential election
