= Epifanio Méndez Fleitas =

Paraguayan musician, writer and poet (1917–1985)

President of the Central Bank of Paraguay
- In office 5 February 1955 – 3 January 1956
- Preceded by: Pedro A. Caballero
- Succeeded by: Gustavo Storm
- In office 2 November 1952 – 5 January 1954
- Preceded by: Pedro Juan Mayor
- Succeeded by: Pedro Juan Mayor

Chief of Police of Asunción
- In office 19 March 1949 – 2 November 1952

Personal details
- Born: April 7, 1917; San Pedro del Paraná, Paraguay
- Died: 22 November 1985 (aged 68); Buenos Aires, Argentina
- Occupation: Politician, banker

Epifanio Méndez Fleitas (7 April 1917 – 22 November 1985) was a Paraguayan politician, musician, writer and poet, and twice the president of Central Bank of Paraguay: from 1952 to 1954 and in 1955. He fled Paraguay during the Alfredo Stroessner years and was the uncle to future President Fernando Lugo. He died in Buenos Aires.

== Early life and career ==
Epifanio Méndez Fleitas was born in San Pedro del Paraná, in the Itapúa Department of Paraguay. He began his studies in his hometown, before relocating to Villarrica where he began his career as a writer by writing his first essays. He began studying law, but he did not conclude his studies because he became involved in political activity: after joining the Colorado Party, he became involved with the government and was appointed first as chief of police of Asunción and, later, as the president of the Central Bank of Paraguay.

In May 1954, Méndez backed Alfredo Stroessner's coup d'état against President Federico Chaves, who had previously fired Méndez from the position of president of the Central Bank. Méndez thus reacquired his previous position at the bank, while also becoming the director of a newspaper, La Unión, which became the most important newspaper aligned with the government.

All the while, he continued his work as a writer, and began writing poetry and composing music. From a young age he wrote poetry in both the Spanish and Guaraní. His works have been published in many magazines. In 1939 he published his first book, “Bajo la verde arboleda”. In 1953, he formed a band called “San Solano” with Reinaldo Meza, Barrios-Espínola, Damasio Esquivel and Nicholas Barrios. In 1976 while in Buenos Aires he revived the group with others. He was also among the founders of the Paraguayan Associated Authors (Autores Paraguayos Asociados, APA); and through his work APA has its own office on Chile Street in Asunción. He also attempted to help spread Paraguayan music to Europe and thus inspired Luis Alberto del Parana and his friends Agustín Barboza and Digno García to form the band “Los Paraguayos” and sent them, on behalf of Paraguay, to Europe.

Epifanio Méndez Fleitas married Fresdesvinda Vall on 6 January. The couple had five children: Teresa, Bernardino, Prudencio, Epifanio, María de la Cruz and José.

== In opposition ==
Méndez' fortunes changed when Juan Perón, President of Argentina and a close friend of Méndez, was deposed in September 1955. While initially emigrating to Paraguay, Perón was eventually forced to leave the country by Stroessner, and he relocated to Venezuela. Méndez' closeness to Perón put him in a weakened position within the Paraguayan junta, and Stroessner, eager to isolate a potential political rival, nominated him ambassador to Spain in January 1956. When Méndez returned in March he was refused entry to Paraguay. He went into exile in Uruguay, and became a harsh critic of the regime and its repressive measures. In March 1960, in Resistencia, Argentina, Méndez joined forces with the Movimiento Popular Colorado (MOPOCO), another faction within the Colorado Party opposing Stroessner and living largely in exile.

While out of the country, Méndez tried to utilize contacts within the Colorado Party to agitate for a change in government. He was tied to a gruesome event in 1962 when some members of the military in Paraguay were accused of being followers of Méndez by the Minister of the Interior, Edgar Ynsfrán, and were subsequently brutally purged.

In 1973, MOPOCO and Epifanio Méndez Fleitas would separate, since the latter would found a new dissident group, the Asociación Nacional Republicana en el Exilio y la Resistencia (ANRER). In 1978, under pressure from the Argentine government, he was expelled from Uruguay and went to the United States. In June 1984 he was allowed to enter Argentina. He died the following year in Buenos Aires.

== Works ==
1936 - Sueños de adolescente (Poetry)
1939 - Bajo la verde arboleda (Poetry)
1950 - Batallas por la democracia (with Osvaldo Chaves)
1951 - El orden para la libertad
1965 - Diagnosis paraguaya
1971 - Psicología del Colonialismo. Imperialismo yanqui-brasilero en el Paraguay
1973 - Ideologías de dependencia y segunda emancipación
1976 - Lo histórico y lo antihistórico en el Paraguay. Carta a los colorados
1979 - Carta a los liberales
1980 - Carta a un compañero
1983 - Marxismo teórico y utópico. Estructura del neocolonialismo en el Paraguay
