= Adela and Celsa Speratti =

- L to R: Celsa Speratti and Adela Speratti
- Born: (Adela) 1865; (Celsa) 1868 (Adela) Barrero Grande, Paraguay; (Celsa) Luque, Paraguay
- Died: (Adela) 1902 (aged 36–37) ; (Celsa) 1938 (aged 69–70); Asunción, Paraguay
- Occupation: educators
- Years active: 1886–1902; 1890–1907
- Known for: establishing the first teacher training schools in the country after the War of the Triple Alliance

Adela Speratti (1865–1902) and Celsa Speratti (1868–1938) were Paraguayan sisters who were instrumental in developing the educational system of the country. Born during the War of the Triple Alliance, in which their father was killed, the sisters and their mother became refugees, fleeing to Argentina. Both trained as teachers there before returning to Paraguay and establishing the first normal school in Asunción.

== Early life ==
Adela Speratti was born in 1865 in Barrero Grande and Celsa was born in 1868 in Luque, Paraguay. Their mother, Dolores Speratti, was the daughter of José Miguel Speratti, natural son of Josefa Facunda Speratti. Josefa was the wife of Fulgencio Yegros, one of the military officers who fought for Paraguayan independence and first head of state of an independent Paraguay, and daughter of José Tomás Speratti, who had immigrated from Bergamo, Italy to Paraguay before his daughter's birth.

Both Adela and Celsa were born during the War Of The Triple Alliance, in which their father served as a soldier and which caused their mother to become a refugee. Fleeing the violence, Delores moved from place to place until the war ended in 1870. Their father was killed in the Battle of Ytororó in December 1868, after which the family moved to Corrientes, Argentina. From there they moved on to Buenos Aires, where the two girls began their schooling. In 1882, mother and daughters moved again, settling in Concepción del Uruguay in eastern Argentina, where Delores worked at the normal school, Escuela Normal de Maestros y Profesores "Mariano Moreno" (Mariano Moreno Normal School of Teachers and Professors) and Adela began training to become a teacher. Celsa followed her sister's footsteps and enrolled in the same school a few years later.

== Careers ==
Completing her studies in 1886, Adela initially joined the school's administration workers and later became the chair of their mathematics department. In 1889 Adela moved to Corrientes, where she taught as a professor of reading and writing at the normal school, for first and second year students. At the encouragement of two other Argentine-trained, Paraguayan teachers, Anastacio Riera and Rosa Peña Guanes, wife of the former Paraguayan President Juan Gualberto González, Adela agreed to return to Paraguay to help the country recover from the war, leaving Argentina in March 1890.

By May 1890, Adela had established a school for preceptors in Asunción, the first training facility opened in the country after the war had ended. Celsa joined her in the school and helped organize the first graduate school for girls. They pioneered improved teaching methods, expanding the opportunities for women to become educated in the country. In 1897, Adela founded the normal school and became director of the institution, which she headed until her death on 8 November 1902. Celsa became the school director after Adela died and headed the school for five years. In 1907, Celsa married the president of the Superior Court of Justice, Pablo G. Garcete and retired from teaching. She died in Asunción, in 1938.

== Legacy ==
The Normal School in Asunción was renamed in Adela's honor and in 1960, La Escuela Básica Nº 6722 in her home town, now known as Eusebio Ayala was also named after her. The government issued a banknote in the denomination of ₲2,000 (two thousand Paraguayan guaraní) which features Adela and Concepción Silva de Airaldi. Though the bank note is titled as if the photographs were Adela and Celsa, the likeness does not match the known images of her. The government awards a prize for excellence in education, the Prize Professor Adela Speratti and Ramón Indalecio Cardozo, in honor of Adela and Cardozo's dedication to improving education in the country.
