= Recoleta, Asunción =

Coordinates: 25°17′50″S 57°35′10″W

Recoleta
- Barrio
- Interactive map of Recoleta
- Country: Paraguay
- City: Asunción
- District: La Recoleta

Recoleta is a neighbourhood (barrio) of Asunción, Paraguay.
