= Republicano =

Coordinates: 25.3205°S 57.6352°W

- Barrio
- Interactive map of Republicano
- Country: Paraguay
- Autonomous Capital District: Gran Asunción
- City: Asunción

Area
  - Total: 0.97 km^{2} (0.37 sq mi)
- Elevation: 43 m (141 ft)

Population
  - Total: 9,800

Republicano is a neighbourhood (barrio) of Asunción, Paraguay.
