= Federico Chaves =

Paraguayan political and military figure

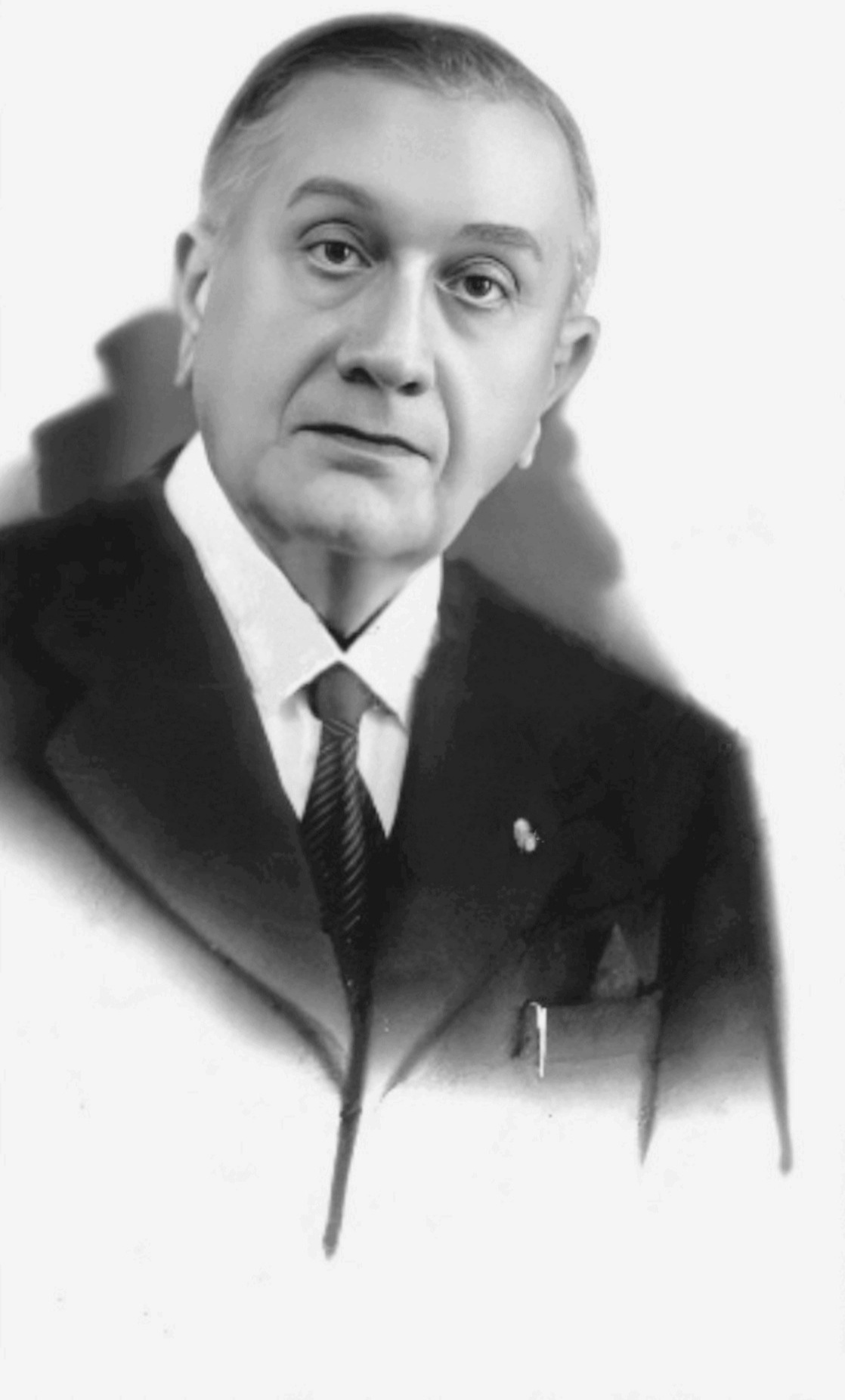
- Chaves in 1950

40th President of Paraguay
- In office 10 September 1949 – 4 May 1954
- Preceded by: Felipe Molas
- Succeeded by: Tomás Romero (interim president)

Personal details
- Born: Federico Chaves Careaga; 15 February 1882 Paraguarí, Paraguay
- Died: 24 April 1978 (aged 96) Asunción, Paraguay
- Party: Colorado Party

Federico Chaves Careaga (15 February 1882 – 24 April 1978) was a Paraguayan politician and soldier who served as President of Paraguay from 10 September 1949 to 4 May 1954. He was a member of the Colorado Party.

== Early life ==
Chaves was born on 15 February 1882, in Paraguarí. His parents were the Portuguese Federico Chaves and his wife Felicia Careaga, from Guaira, Paraguay.

== Political history ==
Chaves, who received his law degree in 1905, was a longtime leader of the right-of-centre National Republican Association, better known as the Colorado Party. When his party served in a coalition government in 1946, Chaves was appointed to the Supreme Court. He served as Paraguay's foreign minister from 1947. He was elected in April 1949 as President of the Chamber of Representatives, and kept that post until he became president in September 1949. He was elected for a three-year term in 1950 and later reelected in 1953. When Chaves tried to strengthen his regime by arming the national police in 1954, a coup d'état led by General Alfredo Stroessner on May 4 ended his administration.

== Death ==
Chaves died on 24 April 1978 at the age of 96 in the city of Asunción, from natural causes. He was buried with full state honours; Stroessner attended the services. From the death of Ecuadorian President Isidro Ayora on 22 March 1978 until his own death, he was the oldest living state leader.

Political offices
Preceded by Felipe Molas	President of Paraguay; 1949-1954	Succeeded by Tomás Romero
