= Pablo Daniel Magee =

French writer

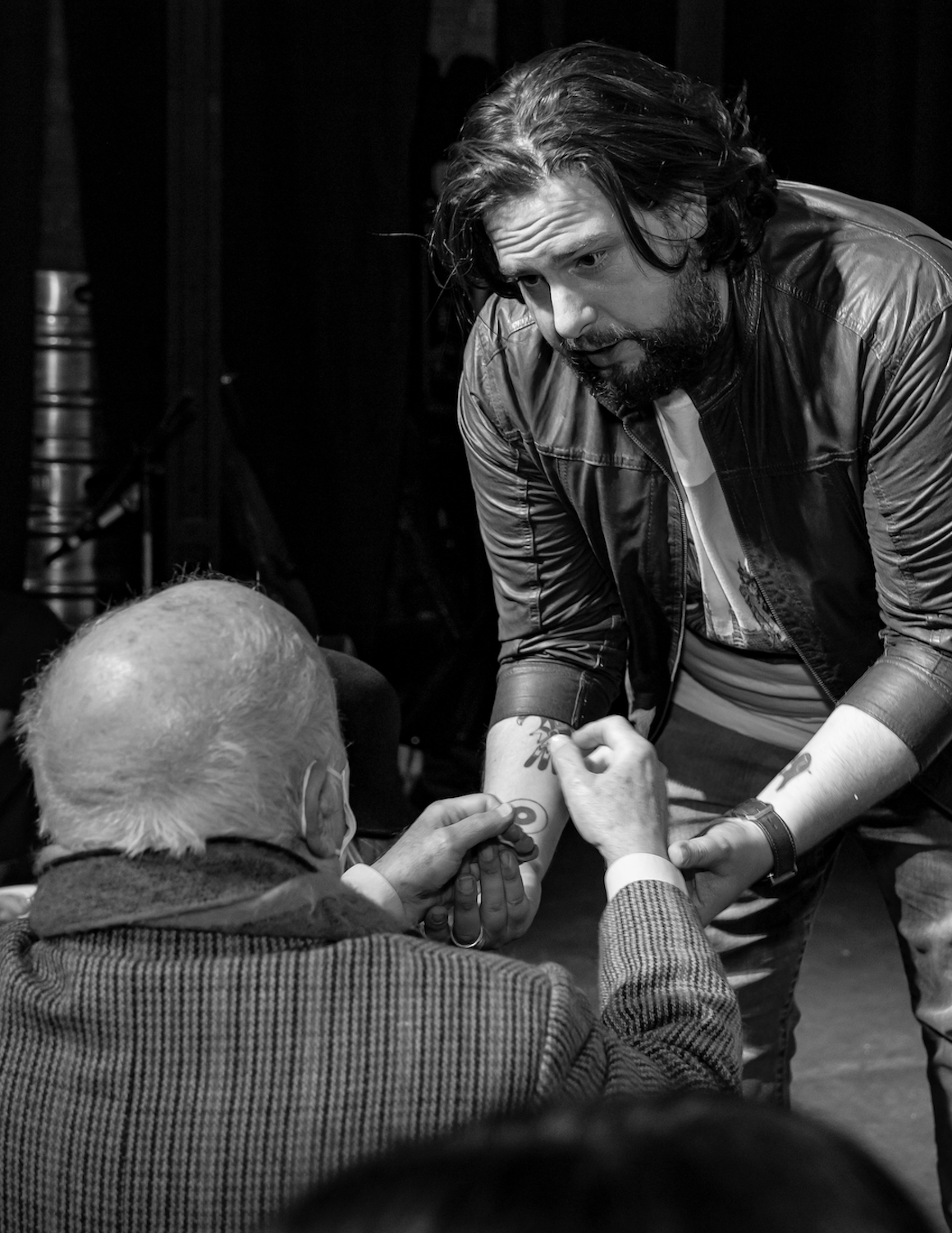
- Pablo Daniel Magee onstage, being saluted by Maestro Jose Luis Ardissone after a play.
- Born: 22 April 1985 (age 41); Paris
- Education: University of Provence, University of Greenwich, Sotheby's Institute of Art, Harvard University
- Alma mater: University of Greenwich
- Spouse: Human Rights Lawyer Romy Fischer
- Relatives: Father Patrice Stellest
- Writing career
- Language: French, English, Spanish
- Period: Contemporary
- Genres: Non fiction novels, Chronicles, Plays, Film scenarii
- Notable works: Opération Condor, Honorablissîme, Fanpharaonnes

Pablo Daniel Magee (born 22 April 1985) is a French Swiss author, investigative journalist, screenwriter and playwright.

== Early life and education ==
His father is the Swiss painter, sculptor and filmmaker Patrice Stellest. His mother is a poet and photographer who named her son after Pablo Neruda. He grew up in Saint-Rémy de Provence. He was inspired to become a journalist by reading the adventures of Tintin at a young age and after meeting Jorge Semprún – an author, Nazi concentration camp survivor and scenario writer for Costa Gavras – during his final year at the Lycée Mistral of Avignon.

Having obtained his literary baccalaureat, he was about to enter the Institut d'Etudes Politiques in Paris when he shifted from this initial academic choice and travelled to Peru. Upon his return to Europe in 2005, he attended the University of Greenwich, in London, where he pursued a multiple programme in philosophy, the arts, cinema and journalism. During his London years, his philosophy professor disclosed to him that he had worked for the cabinet of U.S. Secretary of State Henry Kissinger and had attended meetings with the CIA that focused on the coup d'état against Chilean President Salvador Allende and the United States' support for Operation Condor in Latin America. This prompted Magee to become closely interested in the issue.

In 2012, he traveled to Paraguay, where he met Martin Almada, human rights defender, and discoverer in 1992 of the Operation Condor archives, and decided to write a book about him. In 2013, he left France to settle in Paraguay for an investigation that was to last eight years, during which he met and interviewed personalities such as Stéphane Hessel, Robert Badinter, Juan-Martín Guevara (brother of revolutionary Che Guevara), Pope Francis, Pierre Rabhi, Jean Ziegler, Miguel Angel Estrella, and Costa Gavras.

Parallel to his research, Magee devotes his time to dramatic and journalistic writing, contributing articles to international journals such as Forbes. He also familiarizes himself with buddhist scriptures at the Harvard Divinity School, under the supervision of Professor Charles Hallisey, Yehan Numata Senior Lecturer on buddhist literatures at Harvard University.

== Work ==
=== Literature ===
In 2020, Magee published Opération Condor, un homme face à la terreur en Amérique latine with Editions Saint-Simon. This non-fiction novel focuses on the life of Paraguayan human rights defender Martin Almada, also known as "the hunter of the Condor" for having unearthed the Terror Archives of Operation Condor in 1992. Opération Condor is prefaced by filmmaker Costa Gavras, president of the Cinémathèque Française and director of the films Missing and State of Siege. The cover of the book is the photograph of a condor taken by renowned wildlife argentinean photographer Eliseo Miciu.

In the 6 February 2021 edition of Marianne, philosopher Robert Redeker writes: "The real-life novel of Pablo Daniel Magee, breathtaking like a crime novel, moving like a love novel, political like a spy novel and educational like a historical novel installs in the European imagination a character worthy of a place next to Antigone". In his book, Magee is the first investigator to establish the presence of Cuban revolutionary Che Guevara in Paraguay on 3 October 1966, based on Top Secret documents of the Archive of Terror and testimonies of first-hand witnesses such as Joel Filartiga, whose role was interpreted by actor Anthony Hopkins in Hollywood biopic One Man's War. Magee later dedicated a trilogy of chronicles entitled My uncle the Che to this part of his investigation, published in the political analysis magazine Terere Cómplice in 2022. On 25 May 2021 Opération Condor was added to the U.S. Library of Congress. Following the book's publication, Almada was decorated with the National Order of the Legion of Honour by the President of France, Emmanuel Macron, on 6 December 2021.

The latest work by Magee, Pundonoroso/Honorablissime, published in the Southern Cone in a bilingual French/Spanish edition by Edición Servilibro, retraces Martin Almada’s journey in search of historical justice. The book is prefaced by Agustín Nuñez, a master of South American theater, who describes it as occupying "a central place in the Latin American cultural pantheon". This work is illustrated by urban street artist Oz Montanía.

The author relates that he was a victim of continuous threats against his life during his investigation and the writing of these two works, which he has dedicated to preserving the memory of the horrors of Latin American dictatorships.

=== Books ===
- L'eau chante au Lapacho, Éditions Lapachos, 2014, 37p. ISBN 978-9-99532-884-9
- Opération Condor, Saint-Simon, 2020, 378p. ISBN 978-2-37435-025-7
- Pundonoroso/Honorablissime, Servilibro, 2021, 117p. ISBN 978-99925-254-1-8

=== Cinema ===
Between 2005 and 2009, Magee worked for Pinewood Studios in the production teams of many American blockbusters, including Sherlock Holmes by Guy Ritchie, and Gulliver's Travels by Rob Letterman. During those years, he shared film sets with actors Anthony Hopkins, Benicio del Toro, Emily Blunt, Hugo Weaving, Jack Black, Jude Law, Rachel McAdams, and Robert Downey Jr. This immersion in the world of cinema fuelled his passion for the field. Magee reported in a televised interview that Sir Anthony Hopkins told him about the dictatorship in Paraguay and his interpretation of human rights activist Joel Filartiga, when they met on the set of Wolfman by Joe Johnston, which also encouraged the young writer to study paraguayan history.

In 2009, Pablo Daniel Magee wrote and directed a short film titled Pass:on for Watch a Thought Productions, in which he featured eight international artistes, four painters and four musicians, who did a free improvisation, live and direct, of a fresco and an original piece of music. The painters Magee directed included his father, artist Patrice Stellest. Magee also collaborated for this work with British musician John Altman, film score composer of Titanic by James Cameron, James Bond: Golden Eye and No Time to Die, or Monty Python’s Life of Brian; composer for Barry White, Michael Jackson, Prince or Björk; and musician with the bands of Sting, Amy Winehouse, Bob Marley, Chet Baker, Jimi Hendrix and many others, as he describes in his memoirs Hidden Man: My many musical lives.

In 2011, Magee co-authored and directed the short 3D movie Stellest Genesis for artist Patrice Stellest. For this work he collaborated with New York City DJ Moby, who composed the music for it.

In 2018, he collaborated with Canadian filmmaker Jorge Diaz de Bedoya to develop the scenario for the feature film El Supremo Manuscrito, which plunges the spectator into the corrupt world of contemporary Paraguay in search of the last manuscript of writer Augusto Roa Bastos, stolen by art traffickers.

=== Film awards ===
Stellest Genesis

- Best International Peace Short Award at the Dubai Independent film festival 2022
- Best Music Video Award at the Five Continents International Film Festival 2022
- Best Animated Film Gold Award at the Hollywood Gold Awards Film Festival 2022
- Best Music Video Gold Award at the Hollywood Gold Awards Film Festival 2022
- Best Music Video Award at the London Movie Awards 2022
- Honorable Mention Award in the Best Animation Film category at the Los Angeles Film Awards 2022
- Best Short Animation Silver Award at the Milan Gold Awards Film Festival 2022
- Honorable Mention Award in the Best Short Animation Category at the Paris Film Awards 2022
- Honorable Mention Award in the Best Original Score category at the South Film and Arts Academy Festival 2022
- Best Animation Short Film Audience Award at the South Film and Arts Academy Festival 2022
- Best Short Animation Award at the South Film and Arts Academy Festival 2022
- Honorable Mention Award in the Best Screenplay in a Short Film category at the South Film and Arts Academy Festival 2022
- Best Sound and Music Award at the Wildsound Writing and Film Festival - Toronto 2022
- Best Short Animation Award at the Arthouse Festival of Beverly Hills 2022

PASS:ON

- Best Experimental Short Award at the Five Continents International Film Festival 2022
- Nominee in the Best Director category at the Los Angeles Film Awards 2022
- Honorable Mention Award in the Best Experimental Film category at the Los Angeles Film Awards 2022
- Nominee in the Best Experimental Short category at the Hollywood International Golden Age Festival 2022
- Best Experimental Film Award at the London International Short Film Festival 2022
- Nominee in the Best Experimental Film category at the London Movie Awards 2022
- Honorable Mention Award in the Best Video Art Film category at the Los Angeles Experimental Forum Film Awards 2022
- Nominee in the Best Poetic Film category at the Sensei Tokyo Film Festival 2022
- Best Experimental Short Award at the Rio de Janeiro World Film Festival 2022
- Nominee in the Best Poetic Film category at the Lonely Wolf - London International Film Festival 2022
- Nominee in the Best New Media category at the Lonely Wolf - London International Film Festival 2022
- Honorable Mention Award in the Best Experimental Film category at the New York Movie Awards 2022
- Best Director at the New York Movie Awards 2022
