= Patrice Stellest =

Swiss artist (born 1953)

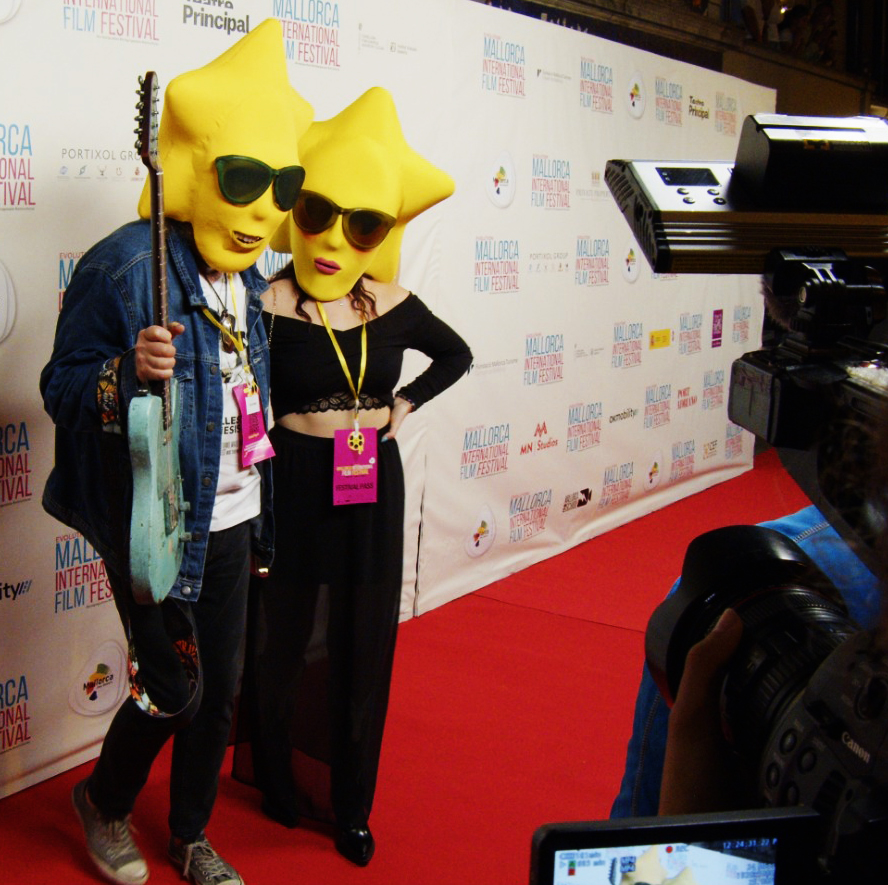
- Stellest wearing a mask of his Starman character on the red carpet of the Mallorca International Film Festival
- Born: 23 May 1953 (age 73); St. Gallen, Switzerland
- Education: California Institute of the Arts (BFA); Art Center College of Design (MFA)
- Occupations: Conceptual art, installation art, painting, film, Eco Scene Musician
- Children: Pablo Daniel Magee
- Writing career
- Period: Contemporary
- Subject: Trans Nature Art
- Notable works: The Solar Head, Stellephant
- Website: stellest.com

Patrice Stellest, (a.k.a. "Stellest"; born 23 May 1953) is a Swiss artist renowned for founding the Trans Nature art movement. He is considered an eco-futurist visionary. Stellest is one of the founding fathers of renewable energy sculptures. He is also the father of French writer Pablo Daniel Magee.

== Life and career ==
After a childhood spent in his hometown, Stellest left for the United States, where he initially intended to study costume design at the University of Redlands. Around this time, he also met Charles LeMaire, who encouraged him to do costume design professionally. However, Stellest wanted to be a part of the contemporary art world, and trained at the California Institute of the Arts, co-founded by Walt Disney. While there, he specialized in experimental art under his mentor, Jules Engel, animator-in-chief of the Fantasia cartoon. After obtaining his diploma, Stellest continued his studies at the Art Center College of Design in Pasadena, California. During this time, he directed a series of short films associating artistic experimentation and music. Sensing that there was a future for video clips, he presented his work to filmmaker Oliver Stone while the latter was directing the film titled The Doors. In 1982, Stellest received the first Art Centre Prize for Portraits 1982, which highlights the place of women in the art world. This work was to be re-edited in 2005 in collaboration with New York DJ Moby.

In 1984, Stellest moved to Paris and took over the studio of artists Claus Oldenburg and James Rosenquist. However, it is in the Touraine where, following in the footsteps of Max Ernst, he blossomed out artistically by initiating himself in the techniques of welding on pieces of scrap metal. He wished, in this way, to restore meaning to this unused raw material. He went on to broaden his knowledge of sculpture on metal as an assistant to Greek artist Costa Coulentianos in Saint-Rémy de Provence, in the South of France. He then became friends with César Baldaccini, René Dürrbach, Leo Castelli and the German writer Ulrich Zieger, screenwriter for Wim Wenders' film Faraway, So Close!, winner of the Grand Prix at the 1993 Cannes Film Festival, for whom he went on to illustrate three books (See the Books and Publications Section). Around the same time, he began a long relationship by correspondence with emblematic exhibition commissioner Harald Szeemann (This correspondence can be consulted today in Files 1668 and 3906 of the Szeemann Collection at the Getty Research Institute Library in Los Angeles).

A Frenchman at heart, it is in Paris that Stellest created his artistic movement, Trans Nature Art. He was working at the time with the assistant of Jean Tinguely, Martin Bühler, and CNRS physicist-artist Bernard Gilton on a new genre of works of art bearing a message that had always been present in his mind: the defense of nature and the environment. He also collaborated with the French master of neon, Benoit Nabineau, incorporating light into his works, powered by solar energy. He shares this aspiration for Green art with Joseph Beuys, Sarah Hall, Rosalie Gascoigne and Julian H. Scaff. The encouragements he receives at the time from his friend Dora Maar, Pablo Picasso's wife, push him to move forward with his new concept. The idea is to create works in osmosis with nature, a movement that stems from renewable energy. This movement's landmark work is The Solar Head. Designed to work at its own rhythm thanks to solar energy, this sculpture was the first in a long series of interactive sculptures associating state-of-the-art technology and a new message from the artist. In 2003, the German photographer Thomas Kellner devoted a reportage to Stellest, who was also the focus of an exhibition in Europe. That same year, he was chosen by Lady Béatrice de Andia, General Delegate for the Artistic Action of the City of Paris, for an exhibition in the gardens of her castle in Azay-le-Rideau. In 2009, he took part in the making of the experimental art film Pass:on, written and directed by his son, Pablo Daniel Magee. This project involved eight international artists, including John Altman, who composed music for the films Titanic, by James Cameron, James Bond: Golden Eye and No Time to Die, or Monty Python’s Life of Brian; composer for Barry White, Michael Jackson, Prince or Björk; and musician with the bands of Sting, Amy Winehouse, Bob Marley, Chet Baker, Jimi Hendrix and many others, as he describes in his memoirs Hidden Man: My many musical lives.

After withdrawing for a brief period, Stellest returned to the artistic scene in 2011, when he produced the short 3D film Stellest Genesis, drawn and animated by French graphic artist Romain Caudron and co-directed with his son, Pablo Daniel Magee, once again with the participation of DJ Moby. For that film, Stellest created the “Starpeople”, the “Starman” and the “Starwoman”: starfaced humanoid aliens coming to Earth to clean it from pollution and violence. Since then, Stellest appeared several times in public wearing a Starman mask, as it was the case on the red carpet of the Mallorca International Film Festival in 2022. Also in 2011, he illustrated the last work of Ulrich Zieger, Première visite dans le refuge (First visit to the refuge), did a series of exhibitions in which he presented The machine for making green babies and went on stage, electric guitar in hand, to present musical compositions of his own. In 2012, Dr. Paul O’Brien, a professor of aesthetics and cultural theory at the National College of Art and Design in Dublin, did a study of Stellest as one of the intellectual disciples of artist Joseph Beuys in an article he devoted to art, culture, and ecology. In 2013, authors Jesse Russell and Ronald Cohen authored a book on him, which they soberly titled Patrice Stellest. Very involved in the academic world and the transmission of knowledge (he has given presentations in schools throughout his career) Stellest took part in 2016 along with Kathleen Deck in the Conservation through Creation initiative of the University of California Irvine with the aim of drawing attention to global warming through art. A lover of the Touraine, he did an exhibition in 2018 at Azay-le-Rideau, heartthrob city of artist Alexander Calder. During that exhibition, he presented his latest short film Renewable Energy Art Made in France.

In 2019, the University of Chicago inaugurated a course on the work of Stellest. In 2022, he is taking part in the charity initiative Une Oeuvre pour l'hôpital, aimed at raising funds for French hospitals confronted with the COVID-19 pandemic.

== Books and publications ==
- Ulrich Zieger, Patrice Stellest, Grosse beruhigte Körper, Berlin, Galrev Druck, 1992, 112p. ISBN 9783910161238
- Ulrich Zieger, Patrice Stellest, Schwarzland, Berlin, Qwert zui opü, 1994, 48p. ISBN 9783910161443
- Ulrich Zieger, Patrice Stellest, Première visite dans le refuge, Berlin, Rugerup, 2011, 98p. ISBN 978-3942955058
- Jesse Russell, Ronald Cohen, Patrice Stellest, New York, Transmedia, 2013, 80p. ISBN 9785512439012

== Awards ==
- Best International Peace Short Award for Stellest Genesis at the Dubai Independent film festival 2022
- Best Music Video Award for Stellest Genesis at the Five Continents International Film Festival 2022
- Best Animated Film Gold Award for Stellest Genesis at the Hollywood Gold Awards Film Festival 2022
- Best Music Video Gold Award for Stellest Genesis at the Hollywood Gold Awards Film Festival 2022
- Best Music Video Award for Stellest Genesis at the London Movie Awards 2022
- Honorable Mention Award in the Best Animation Film category for Stellest Genesis at the Los Angeles Film Awards 2022
- Best Short Animation Silver Award for Stellest Genesis at the Milan Gold Awards Film Festival 2022
- Honorable Mention Award in the Best Short Animation Category for Stellest Genesis at the Paris Film Awards 2022
- Honorable Mention Award in the Best Original Score category for Stellest Genesis at the South Film and Arts Academy Festival 2022
- Best Animation Short Film Audience Award for Stellest Genesis at the South Film and Arts Academy Festival 2022
- Best Short Animation Award for Stellest Genesis at the South Film and Arts Academy Festival 2022
- Honorable Mention Award in the Best Screenplay in a Short Film category for Stellest Genesis at the South Film and Arts Academy Festival 2022
- Best Sound and Music Award for Stellest Genesis at the Wildsound Writing and Film Festival - Toronto 2022

== Press, TV, radio ==
- Ils chantent à la lune des mélodies ancestrales, Die Welt, 2 February 1992
- Stellest : Une success story à la française, France 3, 4 August 1992
- L’art Trans Naturel de Stellest, TV Science Frontière, France 3, France Piolet Production
- Trans Nature Art : un art pour vivre, Radio Europe 2, 8 April 2000
- Stellest : Pérégrinations d’un suisse en France, Télévision Suisse Romande (TSR), 14 July 2000
- Une introduction à Trans Nature Art : entre art et musique, MTV, 24 November 2000
- Le Trans Nature Art en scène, France 3, 12 December 2000
- Un soir un artiste : Stellest, M6, 22 December 2000
- Tapis Rouge à Stellest, France Bleu radio, 14 June 2011
