= 2010s in culture =

This article is a summary of developments in culture during the 2010s.

== Film ==
Superhero films became box office leaders. Animated films in the 2010s remained predominantly computer-generated. Traditional animation styles lost favor among general audiences, although (2D) anime remained popular.

3D films gained popularity, led by Avatar, Ice Age: Dawn of the Dinosaurs and Monsters vs. Aliens in late 2009. In 2010, Avatar became the first film to gross more than US$2 billion. Other 3D releases were also successful. 360-degree video also became widely available with the introduction of consumer virtual reality.

Movies and television struggled to maintain their position, as online viewing grew rapidly. Internet piracy was a major concern for the industry. In 2012, Viacom launched a US$1 billion lawsuit against YouTube for copyright infringement. In early 2012, the United States Congress began debating the SOPA and PIPA bills that were heavily lobbied by the entertainment industry.

Avengers: Endgame grossed over $2.7 billion worldwide, becoming the highest-grossing superhero film of all time and the highest-grossing movie of all time, surpassing 2009's Avatar.

Year	2010	2011	2012	2013	2014	2015	2016	2017	2018	2019
Highest grossing by release year	Toy Story 3	Harry Potter and the Deathly Hallows – Part 2	The Avengers	Frozen	Transformers: Age of Extinction	Star Wars: The Force Awakens	Captain America: Civil War	Star Wars: The Last Jedi	Avengers: Infinity War	Avengers: Endgame
Highest grossing by release year	$1.07 Billion	$1.34 Billion	$1.52 Billion	$1.28 Billion	$1.10 Billion	$2.07 Billion	$1.15 Billion	$1.33 Billion	$2.05 Billion	$2.79 Billion
Academy Award for Best Picture winners	The King's Speech	The Artist	Argo	12 Years a Slave	Birdman or (The Unexpected Virtue of Ignorance)	Spotlight	Moonlight	The Shape of Water	Green Book	Parasite
Palme d'Orwinners at the Cannes Film Festival	Uncle Boonmee Who Can Recall His Past Lives	The Tree of Life	Amour	Blue Is the Warmest Colour	Winter Sleep	Dheepan	I, Daniel Blake	The Square	Shoplifters	Parasite
Best films of the Sight & Soundannual poll	The Social Network	The Tree of Life	The Master	The Act of Killing	Boyhood	The Assassin	Toni Erdmann	Get Out	Roma	The Souvenir

== Television ==
The American soap opera format lost popularity in favor of reality television and daytime talk shows. Prime-time television serials and Spanish-language telenovelas remain popular globally. A new development in global television is the great popularity of Turkish drama series in parts of Europe, Asia, Africa and Latin America. Korean dramas continued to enjoy widespread mainstream popularity across Asia. The launch of Korean entertainment channels like Sony ONE and tvN Asia gave access to millions of viewers across parts of East, South and Southeast Asia to watch Korean programs simultaneously with the South Korean broadcast or hours after its broadcast in South Korea.

Cable providers saw a decline in subscriber numbers as cord cutters switched to lower cost online streaming services such as Hulu, Netflix and Amazon Video. These non-cable, internet-based media streaming services even began producing their own programming. TV sets, such as the Samsung SmartTV, started offering online streaming via television. The advent of streaming services has allowed for more serialized television content to rise in popularity which may allow for more complex and longer storytelling. This phenomenon is often referred to as the "Golden Age of Television", due to the large number of high-quality, internationally acclaimed television programs that debuted or aired during the decade. House of Cards became the first online-only web television series to earn major nominations at the Primetime Emmy Awards in 2013. Disney+, a streaming service by Disney launched in November 2019 to big success.

Award winners

Award	2010	2011	2012	2013	2014	2015	2016	2017	2018	2019
Primetime Emmy Award for Outstanding Drama Series	Mad Men	Mad Men	Homeland	Breaking Bad	Breaking Bad	Game of Thrones	Game of Thrones	The Handmaid's Tale	Game of Thrones	Game of Thrones
Primetime Emmy Award for Outstanding Comedy Series	Modern Family	Modern Family	Modern Family	Modern Family	Modern Family	Veep	Veep	Veep	The Marvelous Mrs. Maisel	Fleabag
International Emmy Award for Best Drama Series	The Street(United Kingdom)	Accused(United Kingdom)	Braquo(France)	The Returned(France)	Utopia(United Kingdom)	Spiral(France)	Deutschland 83(Germany)	Mammon(Norway)	Money Heist (Spain)	McMafia(United Kingdom)

== Music ==
Advances in music technology, such as the ability to use 32 or more tracks in real time, changed the sound of many types of music. Globalism and an increased demand for variety and personalization in the face of music streaming services created many subgenres. Dance and pop music surged into the 2010s, with EDM achieving mass commercial success. EDM, synth-pop, indie, alternative, footwork and trap (EDM) saw mainstream success throughout the early to mid-2010s. Trap and hip hop rose to prominence during the mid 2010s and have consistently remained popular forms of music, with hip hop and trap surpassing rock and pop music as the most consumed form of music in the United States in 2017. Inspired by video game culture, retrofuturism, cyberpunk, tech noir themes and collective nostalgia for 1980s culture, electronic genres such as vaporwave and synthwave also enjoyed a rise a popularity throughout much of the decade.

=== Distribution ===
Digital music sales topped CD sales in 2012. Music streaming services such as SoundCloud, Spotify, Apple Music and Pandora Radio became the preferred music delivery systems, similar to movie and television streaming services such as Netflix.

=== Most popular ===
Award	2010	2011	2012	2013	2014	2015	2016	2017	2018	2019
Billboard's best-performing single	"Tik Tok"	"Rolling in the Deep"	"Somebody That I Used to Know"	"Thrift Shop"	"Happy"	"Uptown Funk"	"Love Yourself"	"Shape of You"	"God's Plan"	"Old Town Road"
Billboard's best-performing single	Kesha	Adele	Gotye & Kimbra	Macklemore & Ryan Lewis	Pharrell Williams	Mark Ronson & Bruno Mars	Justin Bieber	Ed Sheeran	Drake	Lil Nas X & Billy Ray Cyrus

=== Award winners ===
Award	2010	2011	2012	2013	2014	2015	2016	2017	2018	2019
Album of the Year Grammy Winners	Fearless	The Suburbs	21	Babel	Random Access Memories	Morning Phase	1989	25	24K Magic	Golden Hour
Album of the Year Grammy Winners	Taylor Swift	Arcade Fire	Adele	Mumford & Sons	Daft Punk	Beck	Taylor Swift	Adele	Bruno Mars	Kacey Musgraves
Record of the Year Grammy Winners	"Use Somebody"	"Need You Now"	"Rolling in the Deep"	"Somebody That I Used to Know"	"Get Lucky"	"Stay with Me"	"Uptown Funk"	"Hello"	"24K Magic"	"This is America"
Record of the Year Grammy Winners	Kings of Leon	Lady Antebellum	Adele	Gotye featuring Kimbra	Daft Punk featuring Pharrell Williams	Sam Smith	Mark Ronson featuring Bruno Mars	Adele	Bruno Mars	Childish Gambino

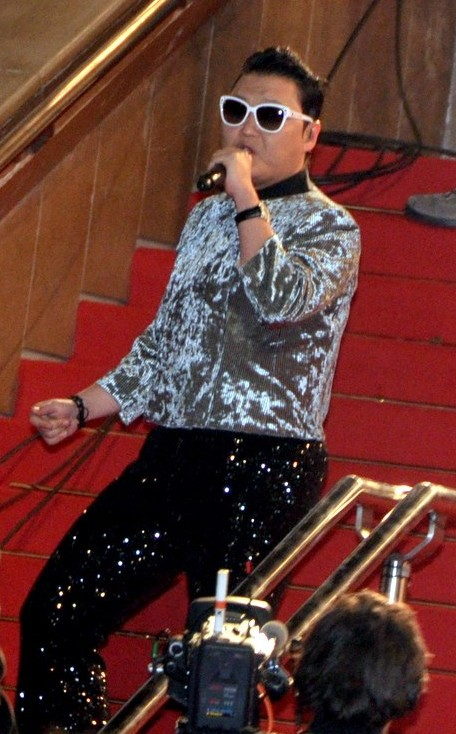
Psy's song "Gangnam Style" broke the record for the most number of YouTube views during 2012 until 2017.

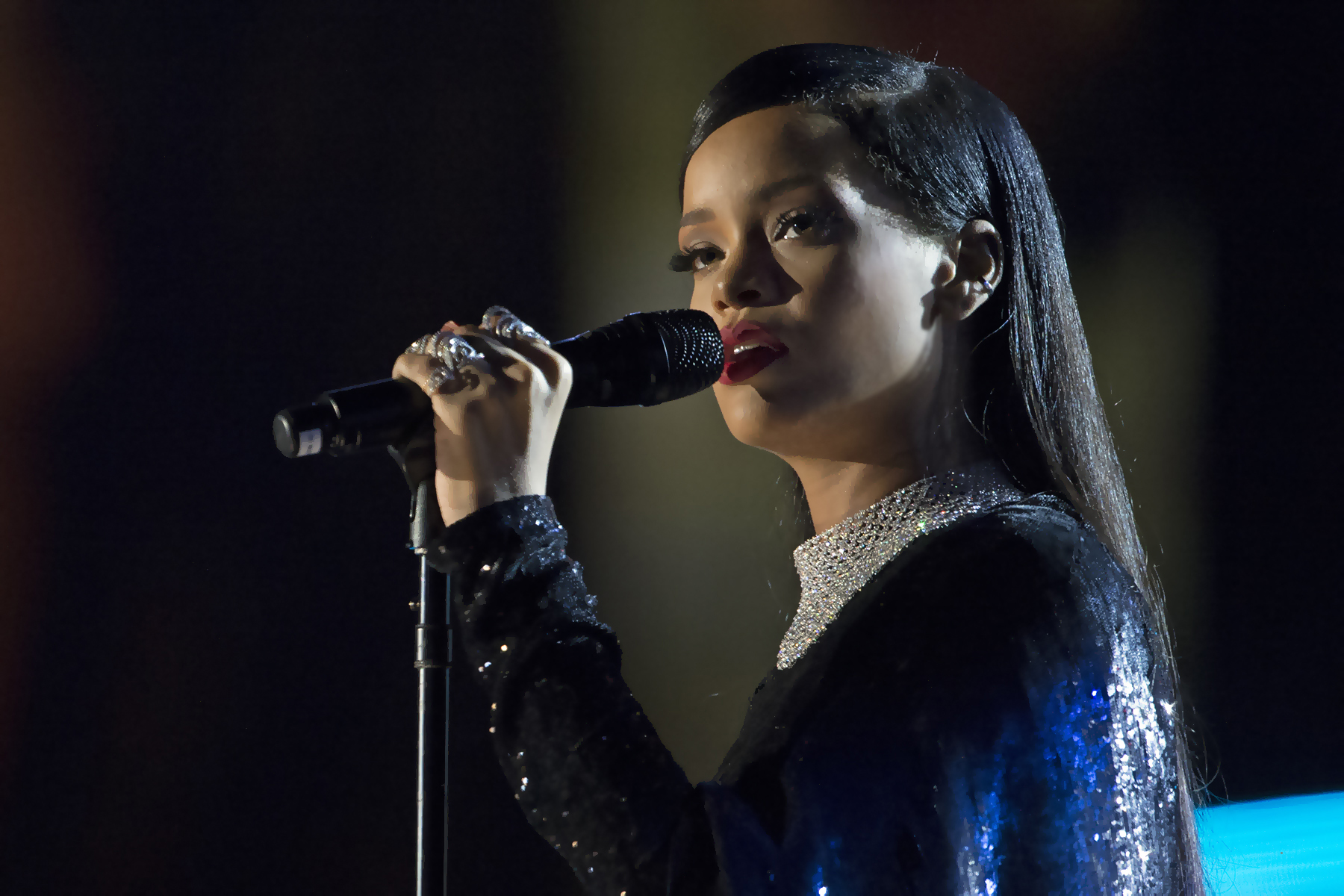
Barbadian artist Rihanna had the most songs top the Billboard Hot 100 chart in the 2010s (nine).

== Video gaming ==
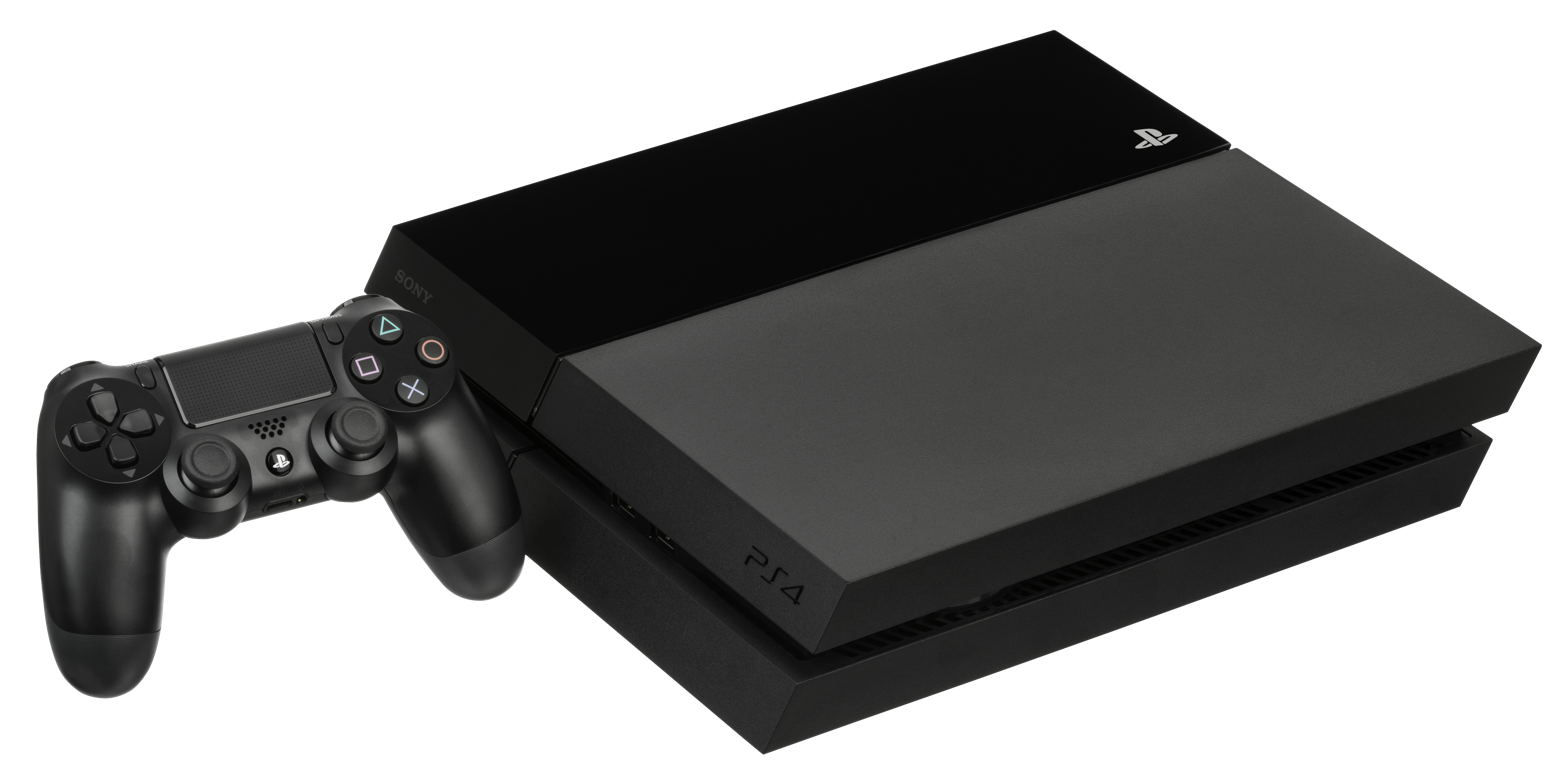
The PlayStation 4 was released in November 2013 and is the best-selling gaming console of the decade (100+ million units sold worldwide as of August 2019).

Cloud gaming, virtual reality, stereoscopic 3D gaming and ongoing improvements in graphics were some of the biggest trends. Video game sales declined in the early 2010s, most likely due to the effects of the Great Recession. According to the Entertainment Software Association, in 2014, the average age of a person who played video games was 30.

=== Consoles ===
The decade began dominated primarily by seventh-generation consoles, such as Xbox 360, the PlayStation 3 and Wii. The Wii introduced the sensor bar with compatible sensitive controllers, followed by the PlayStation Move and Kinect. This expanded the video game market to the elderly and those interested in physical therapy.

With the release of the Nintendo 3DS in early 2011, which introduced a glasses-free interface for 3D, the handheld became the first eighth-generation handheld. Initially struggling in a market dominated by smartphones, the handheld managed to sell 75 million units by June 2019. The PlayStation Vita followed in 2012, and low sales resulted in Sony discontinuing the console by March 2019 and leaving the handheld space altogether.

2012 introduced the first console in the eighth generation with the Wii U, followed in late 2013 with Xbox One and PlayStation 4. The PlayStation 4 managed to outsell its competitors at around 100+ million units, becoming the best selling console in the eighth generation. On the other hand, the Wii U was the lowest selling console of the eighth generation and one of the worst selling consoles in Nintendo history, leaving Nintendo to discontinue the platform in January 2017 in favor of the Nintendo Switch, a hybrid console which allows players to play their console games on the go, utilizing a docking station and detachable controllers. The Nintendo Switch was highly successful, managing to outsell the Wii U by January 2018.

=== PC gaming ===
Games such as The Sims and many of Blizzard's titles remained popular on PCs and expanded to other devices. Minecraft became the best-selling game of all time.

=== Mobile gaming ===
The increased computing power offered by smartphones and computer tablets reinvigorated the mobile gaming market as features such as the app store widened consumers' opportunities to choose where to download mobile apps. The revamped platform led the mobile gaming market to reach US$7.8 billion in revenue in 2012 and $50.7 billion in 2017, occupying 43 percent of the entire global gaming market. Early mainstream mobile games of the decade included Angry Birds, Flappy Bird, Candy Crush Saga, Clash of Clans, Fruit Ninja, and Temple Run.

=== Virtual reality ===
Commercial tethered headsets released for VR gaming include the Oculus Rift and the HTC Vive, and Sony's PlayStation VR (which requires a PlayStation instead of a PC to run).

=== Cloud gaming ===
The OnLive console was released in 2010 becoming the first massively produced cloud gaming-based gaming device.

=== Freemium gaming ===
The later half of the decade saw the explosive growth of free-to-play battle royale games such as Epic Games' Fortnite Battle Royale and Respawn Entertainment's Apex Legends. This model, dubbed "freemium", uses in-game microtransactions and loot boxes to generate revenue. These microtransactions have garnered ethical concerns; the intrusive nature of in-game microtransactions can lead to children accidentally or purposefully rack up a high bill from purchasing in-game items, while the compulsion loop caused by loot boxes has drawn comparisons to gambling addiction.

=== Award winners ===
Award	2010	2011	2012	2013	2014	2015	2016	2017	2018	2019
Spike Video Game Awards	Red Dead Redemption	The Elder Scrolls V: Skyrim	The Walking Dead	Grand Theft Auto V	—					
The Game Awards	—				Dragon Age: Inquisition	The Witcher 3: Wild Hunt	Overwatch	The Legend of Zelda: Breath of the Wild	God of War	Sekiro: Shadows Die Twice

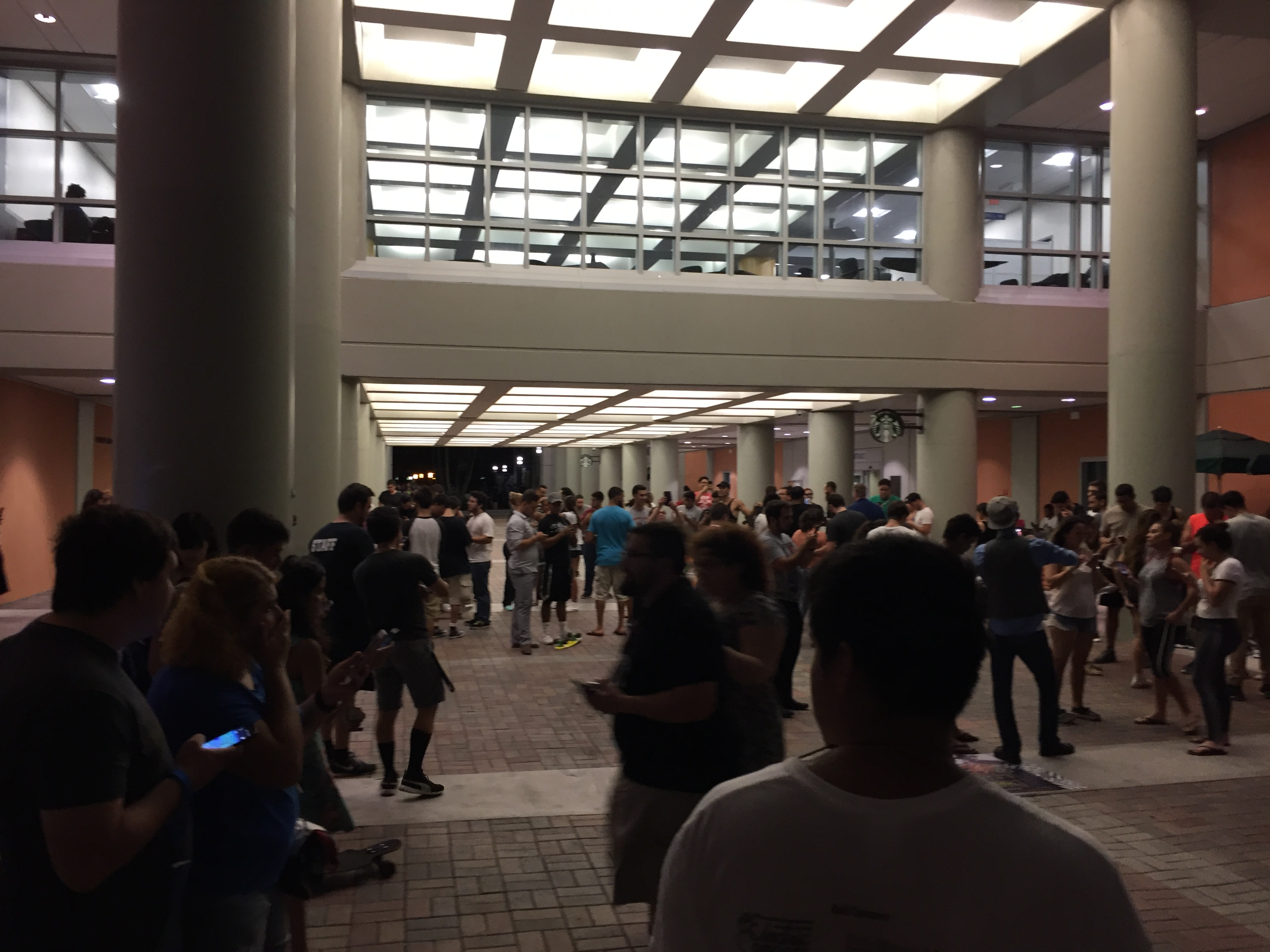
The game Pokémon Go gained tremendous popularity, using augmented reality technology to both promote physical activity.

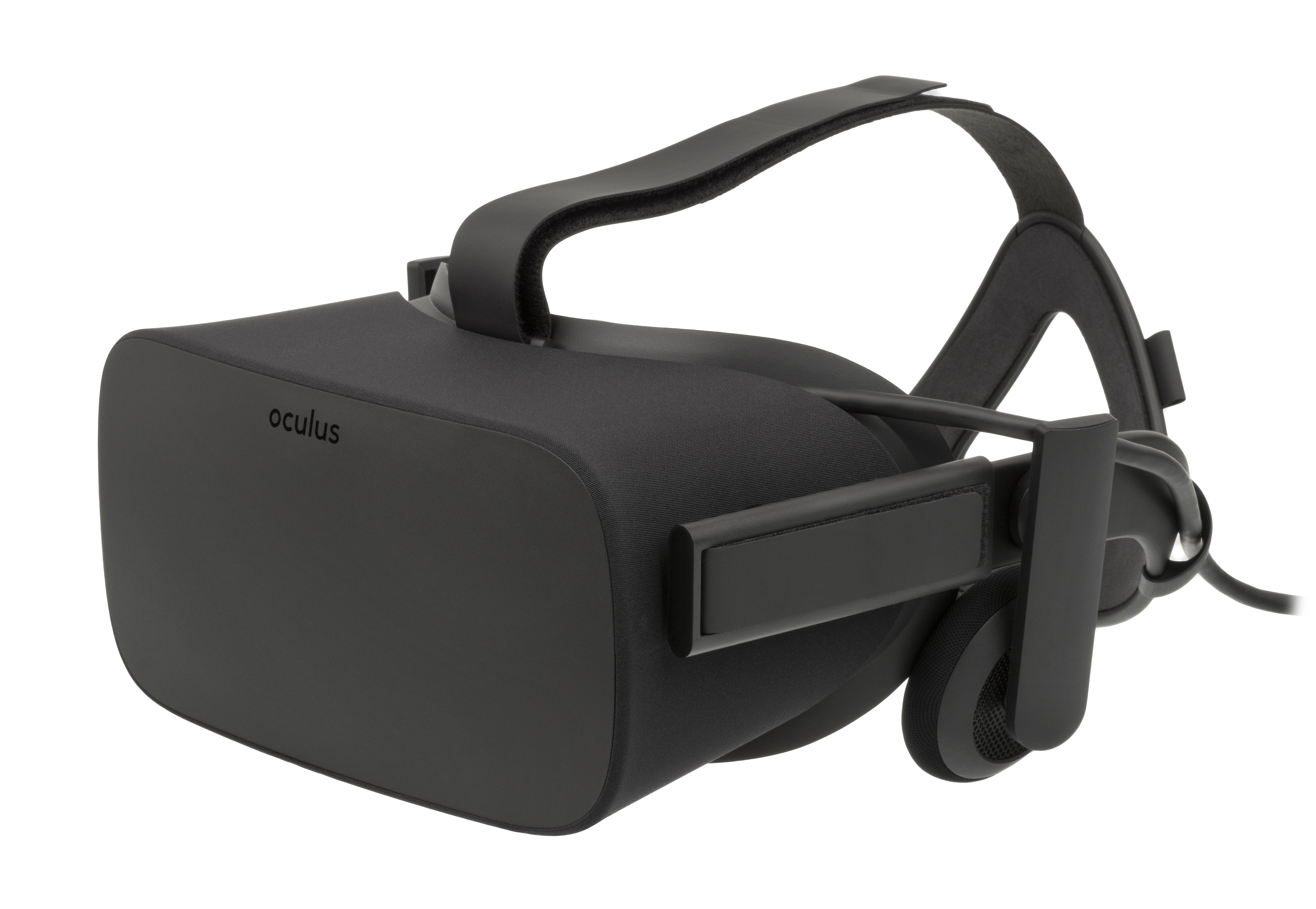
The first generation of the virtual reality headset Oculus Rift.

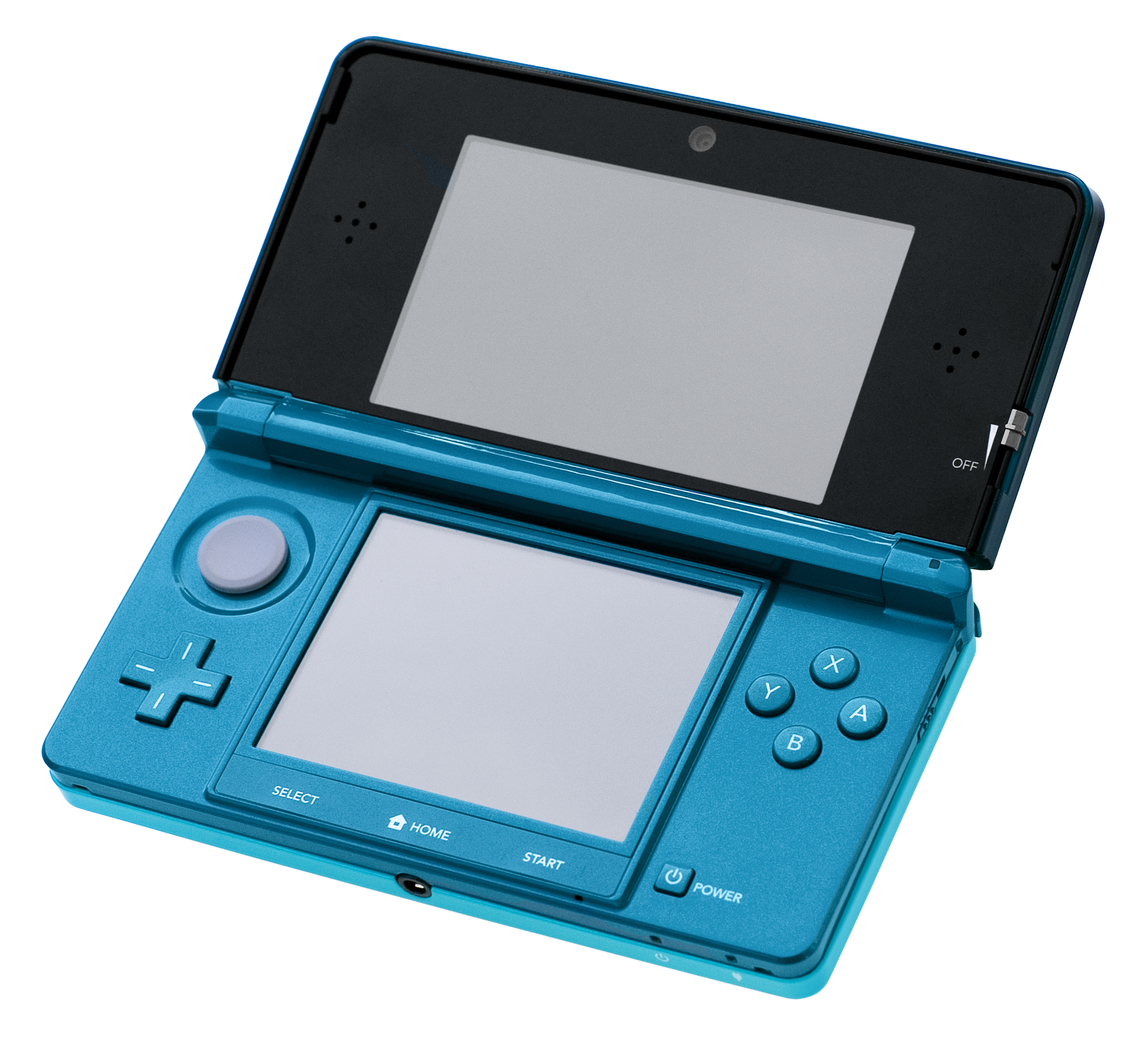
The Nintendo 3DS is the first gaming device released to feature 3D gaming without the need for stereoscopic glasses.

== Architecture ==
Burj Khalifa, tallest building when completed in 2010.

Postmodernism and green design were common architectural themes. "Sustainable design" emphasized natural lighting, green/white roofs, better insulation and other cost-saving features. New urbanism and urban revival influenced urban planning in the United States and other developed countries. China and the Middle East led in large-scale development.

In 2010, the United Arab Emirates' Burj Khalifa became the tallest man-made structure ever built, standing at 828 m (2,717 ft). The United States' One World Trade Center, completed in 2014, is the tallest building in North America at 1,776 ft (541 m).

== Art ==
Art trends that began in earlier decades continued into the 2010s, such as pop art, altermodern, cynical realism, the Kitsch movement, post-contemporary, metamodernism, pseudorealism, remodernism, renewable energy sculpture, street art, Stuckism, Superflat, Superstroke, urban art, video game art and virtual art. In 2015, Excessivism emerged.

== Fashion ==
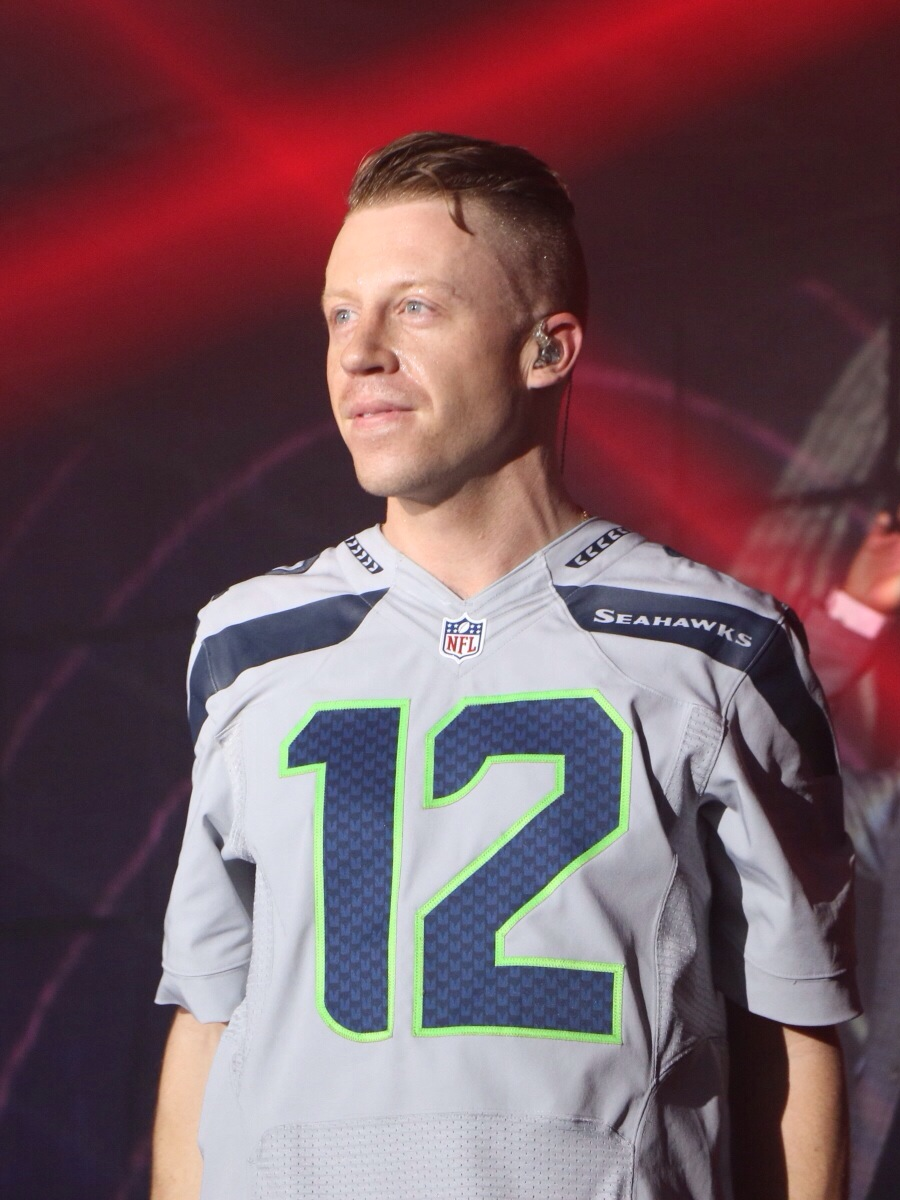
Rapper Macklemore sporting an undercut.

- The 2010s were defined by a revival of 1930s, 1940s, 1970s, early 1990s and skater fashions.
- In many Western countries, the growing of a full beard became a popular trend among young males throughout the decade, with some suggesting this was due to the influence of the hipster subculture and the Movember campaign.
- The undercut, a variation of a crew cut became popular during the decade. The style has been embraced by the hip-hop, hipster and punk subcultures.
- Late 1960s hippie and bohemian fashions were seen. Popular pieces associated with the boho look include palazzo pants, flower crowns, peasant blouses, floaty maxi dresses, gladiator and platform sandals, as well as jumpsuits and cropped top and mini skirt sets in a variety of neutral or pastel colors and simple patterns.
- Items that were significantly fashionable in the 2010s include the fidget spinner, the self-balancing scooter (also known as a "hoverboard"), the selfie stick, and smartwatches. Smartphones themselves were also fairly popular accessories, particularly Apple's iPhone, which came in a variety of fashion-forward colors, including the metallic variation of millennial pink, rose gold, a popular color seen in design throughout the decade.
- Wavy, ombre hair, heavy contouring, and full lips were popular women's cosmetic trends for most of the 2010s.
- Overall, fashion in the 2010s marked a step away from the loose-fitting, ultra-casual mode of the 1990s and 2000s. Dress began to skew slightly more formal, with an emphasis on tighter fitting, sleeker, and simpler outfits. Typifying examples of this being the athleisure and normcore trends. Pastel colors, matte and metallic touches, and a variety of minimalistic and flat designs gained popularity in the 2010s.

== Food ==
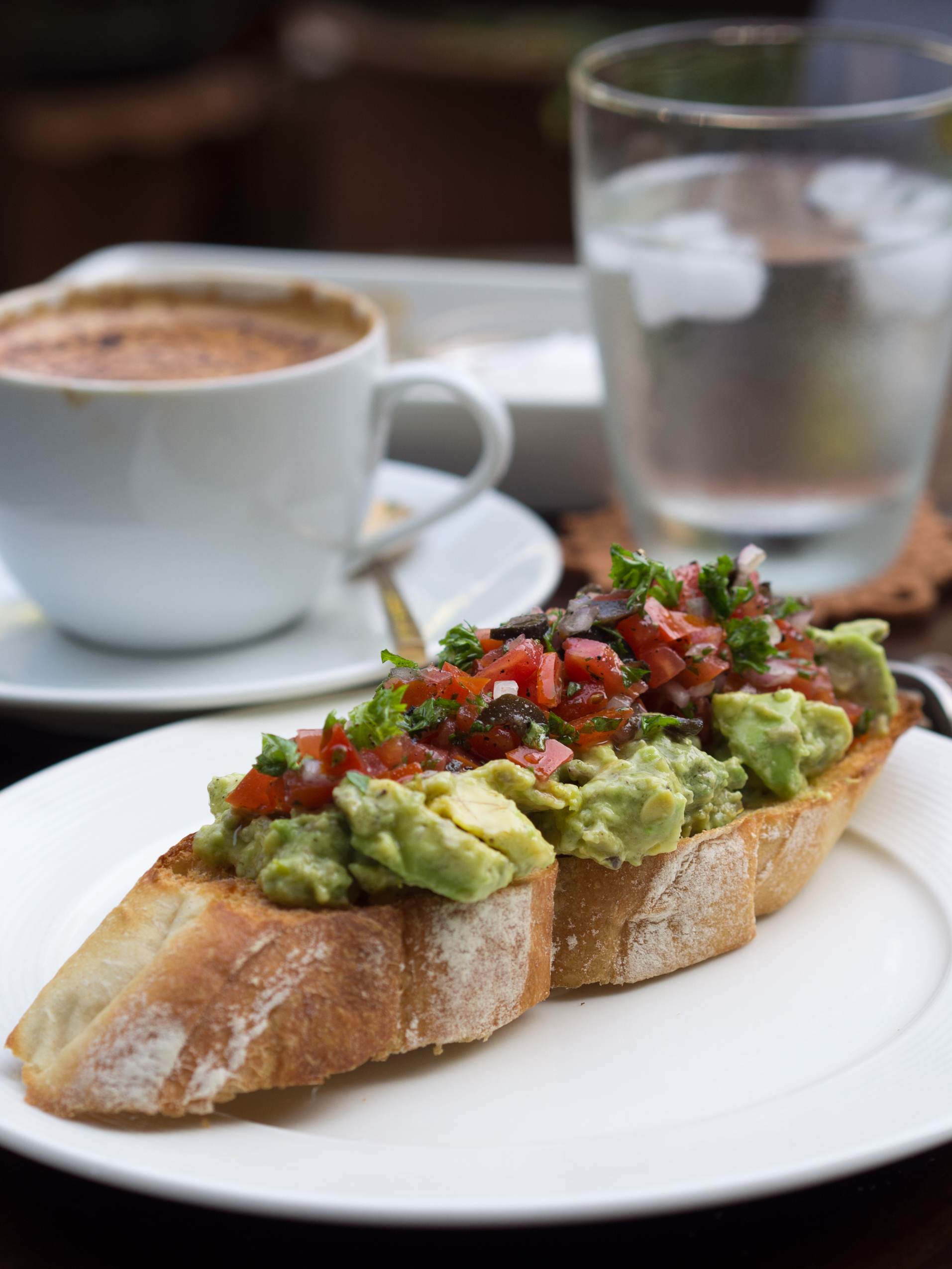
Avocado salad, tomato and salsa on a toasted baguette.

Gluten-free diets became popular. Fusion cuisine offered a new twist on many traditional food items. An interest in local and organic foods carried over from the mid to late 2000s as a part of green and sustainable living. There was an increase in the number of vegetarians and vegans. Finger foods such as hors d'oeuvres and tapas were applied to many desserts and comfort foods. Food presentation became more important as social media caused an increase in food photography and sharing. In the United States, soda sales dipped in favor of healthier options, such as sparkling water. Energy drink sales experienced substantially higher growth than coffee.

The 2010s also saw significant early stage developments in cultured meat, a form of cellular agriculture whereby animal cells are cultured in order to grow meat without the need to raise and slaughter animals. This technology also saw substantial investment from billionaire entrepreneurs such as Richard Branson.

== Theatre ==
In 2013, for the first time, the four nominees for the Best Musical Tony Award were all based on movies. 2016 was the first year in which all the musical acting awards were won by performers of color.

Award	2010	2011	2012	2013	2014	2015	2016	2017	2018	2019
Tony Award for Best Musical	Memphis	The Book of Mormon	Once	Kinky Boots	A Gentleman's Guide to Love and Murder	Fun Home	Hamilton	Dear Evan Hansen	The Band's Visit	Hadestown
Pulitzer Prize for Drama	Next to Normal, by Tom Kitt and Brian Yorkey	Clybourne Park, by Bruce Norris	Water by the Spoonful, by Quiara Alegría Hudes	Disgraced, by Ayad Akhtar	The Flick, by Annie Baker	Between Riverside and Crazy, by Stephen Adly Guirgis	Hamilton, by Lin-Manuel Miranda	Sweat, by Lynn Nottage	Cost of Living, by Martyna Majok	

== Sports ==
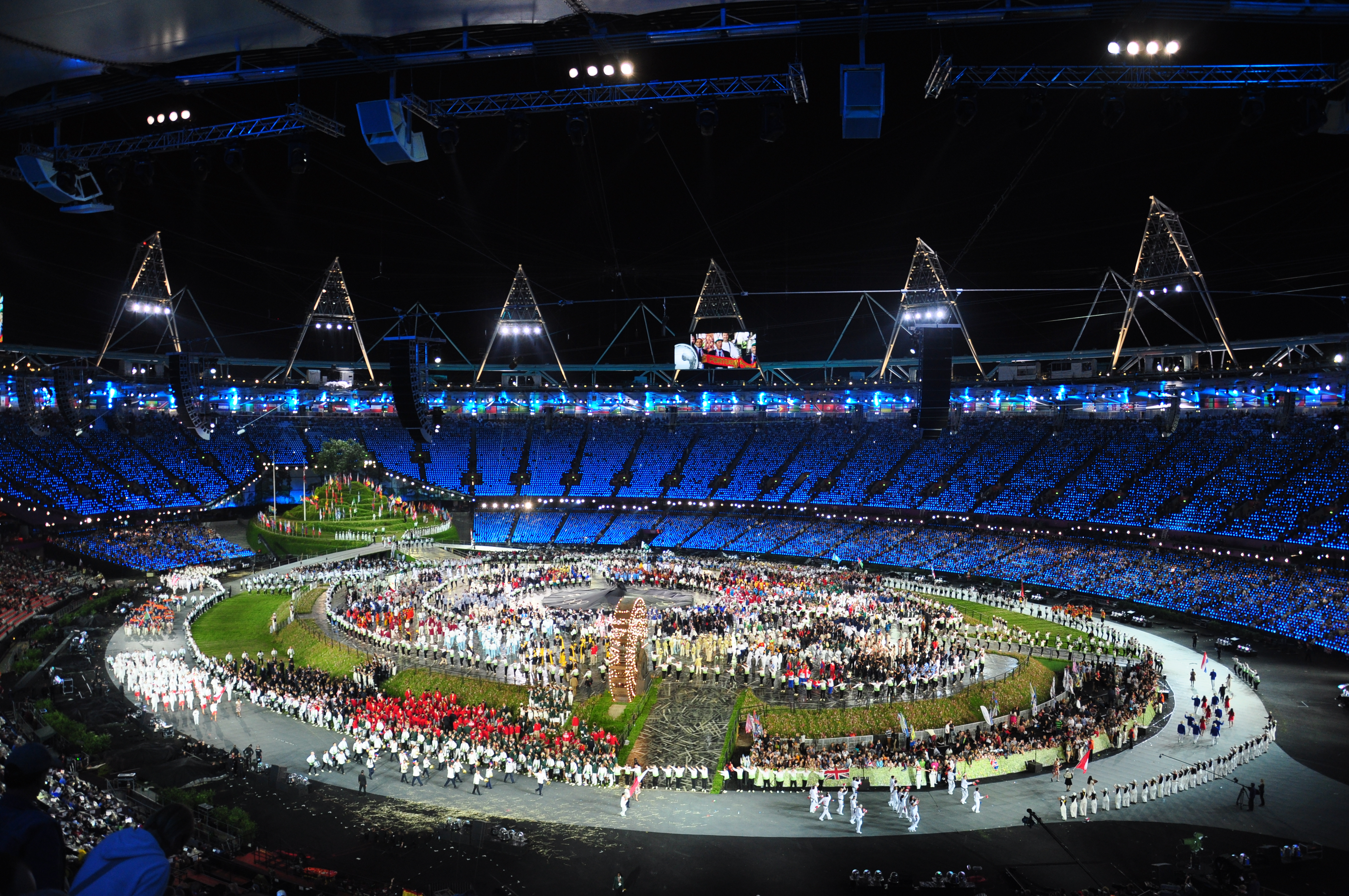
The Parade of Nations at the 2012 Summer Olympics

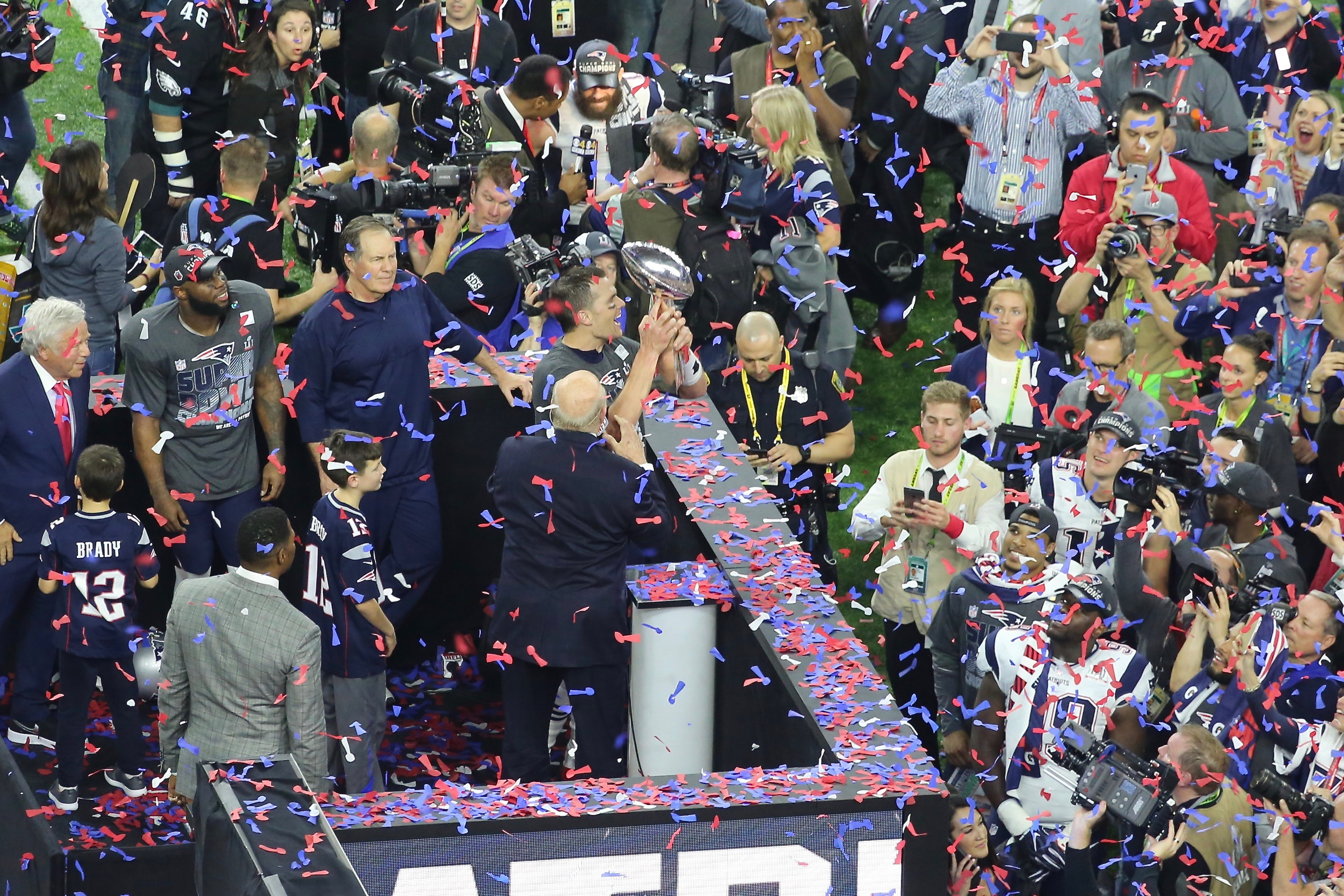
Tom Brady with the Vince Lombardi Trophy following Super Bowl LI, 6 February 2017

- Usain Bolt became the most successful sprinter in Olympic history, holding world records in the 100 metres, 200 metres and 4 × 100 metres relay.
- Spain won the 2010 FIFA World Cup held in South Africa, contested by Netherlands 1–0 in the final.
- India won the 2011 Cricket World Cup by defeating Sri Lanka in the final.
- London became the inaugural city to host the Olympic Games three times, the last in 2012.
- Michael Phelps became the most decorated Olympian ever after winning his 22nd medal in the 2012 Summer Olympics.
- Spain became the inaugural national football team to win three consecutive major tournaments.
- Jason Collins became the inaugural active male professional athlete in a major American professional team sport to publicly come out as gay.
- The 2014 FIFA World Cup is held in Brazil, with Germany claiming their fourth championship by defeating Argentina 1–0 in the final after extra time.
- In 2015, football's world governing body FIFA was accused of bribery totaling hundreds of millions of dollars. Fourteen individuals were indicted.
- The 2015 FIFA Women's World Cup expands to 24 teams of 23 players each and becomes the biggest team female sport event.
- Chile national football team won their first Copa América in 2015 and repeated the feat the following year.
- Australia won the 2015 Cricket World Cup by defeating New Zealand in the final.
- In May 2016, Leicester City became the sixth team to win the Premier League, becoming English league champions for the first time in their 132-year history. They were considered massive outsiders at 5000–1.
- The Cleveland Cavaliers won their first championship in the 2016 NBA Finals. The Cavaliers were the first in NBA Finals history to come back from a 1–3 series deficit.
- The Portugal national team won their first UEFA European Championship in 2016.
- The Chicago Cubs won the World Series, erasing a 108-year championship drought, defeating the Cleveland Indians in Game 7 of the World Series on 3 November 2016.
- New England Patriots quarterback Tom Brady was awarded his fourth Super Bowl MVP award after overcoming a 25-point deficit to defeat the Atlanta Falcons in Super Bowl LI, becoming the player with the most Super Bowl MVP awards in NFL history. This was also the first Super Bowl to be held in overtime.
- The Pittsburgh Penguins repeated as Stanley Cup champions in 2016–2017, becoming the first NHL team to accomplish the occupation since the Detroit Red Wings of 1997–98.
- Paris Saint-Germain's signing of Neymar in 2017 sets an all-time record for highest football transfer fee at €222 million (£198 million).
- The 2018 Winter Olympics were held in Pyeongchang County, Gangwon Province, South Korea, from 9 to 25 February.
- WWE Chairman and CEO Vince McMahon announced the return of the XFL with a target relaunch in 2020. The new league will begin with 8 teams, with the promise of less off-field controversies and faster, simpler play in comparison to the rival NFL.
- In 2018, the Philadelphia Eagles win Super Bowl LII over the New England Patriots 41–33, ending their 57-year championship drought and bringing home their first ever Super Bowl. Nick Foles wins Super Bowl MVP.
- At the start of the 2017–18 season, the NHL is expanded with the creation of the Vegas Golden Knights. The team forms its debut roster by drafting players from all 30 existing teams and advances to the Stanley Cup Final.
- France beat Croatia 4–2 to claim their second World Cup title during the 2018 FIFA World Cup Final at the Luzhniki Stadium in Moscow.
- On 12 June 2019, the NHL's St. Louis Blues won their first-ever Stanley Cup after 52 years, the longest wait for a first Cup for any NHL team in history. The following night, the NBA's Toronto Raptors, the first Canadian NBA Finalist, won their first ever NBA title and became the first-ever Canadian NBA champion, by defeating the two-time defending champion Golden State Warriors in six games.
- The end of the decade saw three Washington, D.C.-based sports teams earn their first championships: the NHL's Washington Capitals, the WNBA's Washington Mystics and the MLB's Washington Nationals. The Capitals overcame prior playoff troubles to win their first Stanley Cup in 2018 through a 4–1 series win over the Las Vegas Golden Knights in the Finals, 44 years since their founding, and just over a year later in October 2019, the Mystics and the Nationals went on unforgettable playoff runs, with both ending in an intense winner-takes-all game victory in the final round to achieve their first titles in franchise history. The Nationals' first World Series title, won against the Houston Astros, was the second-ever one for the city, 95 years after the Washington Senators won its first title.
- England won the 2019 Cricket World Cup by defeating New Zealand in the final.
- On 24 November 2019, in the CFL, the Winnipeg Blue Bombers defeated the Hamilton Tiger Cats at the 107th Grey Cup in Calgary, to win their 11th Grey Cup since 1990.
