= Filártiga v. Peña-Irala =

United States court case

- Court: United States Court of Appeals for the Second Circuit
- Full case name: Dolly M. E. Filártiga and Joel Filártiga v. Americo Norberto Peña-Irala
- Argued: Oct. 16, 1979
- Decided: June 30, 1980
- Citation: 630 F.2d 876 (2d Cir. 1980)

Case history
- Subsequent history: 577 F.Supp. 860 (D.N.Y. 1984)

Court membership
- Judges sitting: Wilfred Feinberg, Irving R. Kaufman, Amalya Lyle Kearse

Case opinions
- Majority: Kaufman, joined by Feinberg, Kearse

Laws applied
- Alien Tort Statute

Filártiga v. Peña-Irala, 630 F.2d 876 (2d Cir. 1980), was a landmark case in United States and international law. It set the precedent for United States federal courts to punish non-American citizens for tortious acts committed outside the United States that were in violation of public international law (the law of nations) or any treaties to which the United States is a party. It thus extends the jurisdiction of United States courts to tortious acts committed around the world. The case was decided by a panel of judges from the United States Court of Appeals for the Second Circuit consisting of judges Wilfred Feinberg, Irving Kaufman, and Amalya Lyle Kearse.

== Events ==
The Filártiga family contended that on March 29, 1976, their seventeen-year-old son Joelito Filártiga was kidnapped and tortured to death by Américo Norberto Peña-Irala. All parties were living in Paraguay at the time, and Peña was the Inspector General of Police in Asunción, the capital of Paraguay. Later that same day, police brought Dolly Filártiga (Joelito's sister) to see the body, which evidenced marks of severe torture. The Filártigas claimed that Joelito was tortured in retaliation for the political activities and beliefs of his father Joel Filártiga.

Filártiga brought murder charges against Peña and the police in Paraguay, but the case went nowhere. Subsequently, the Filártigas' attorney was arrested, imprisoned, and threatened with death. He was later allegedly disbarred without just cause.

In 1978, Dolly Filártiga and (separately) Américo Peña-Irala came to the United States. Dolly applied for political asylum, while Peña had stayed living and working illegally after entering under a visitor's visa. Dolly learned of Peña's presence in the United States and reported it to the Immigration and Naturalization Service, who arrested and deported Peña for staying well past the expiration of his visa.

== Case ==
When Peña was taken to the Brooklyn Navy Yard pending deportation, Filártiga lodged a civil complaint in U.S. courts, brought forth by the Center for Constitutional Rights, for Joelito's wrongful death by torture, asking for damages in the amount of $10 million. After an initial district court dismissal citing precedents that limited the function of international law to relations between states, on appeal, the circuit ruled that freedom from torture was guaranteed under customary international law. "The torturer has become – like the pirate and slave trader before him – hostis humani generis, an enemy of all mankind", wrote the court.

The appellants argued that Peña's actions had violated wrongful death statutes, the United Nations Charter, the Universal Declaration of Human Rights, the American Declaration of the Rights and Duties of Man, and other customary international law. They also claimed the U.S. courts had jurisdiction to hear the case under the Alien Tort Statute, which grants district courts original jurisdiction to hear tort claims brought by an alien that have been "committed in violation of the law of nations or a treaty of the United States". This case interpreted that statute to grant jurisdiction over claims for torts committed both within the United States and abroad.

== Judgment ==
U.S. courts eventually ruled in favor of the Filártigas, awarding them roughly $10.4 million. Torture was clearly a violation of the law of nations, and the United States did have jurisdiction over the case since the claim was lodged when both parties were inside the United States. Additionally, Peña had sought to dismiss the case based on forum non conveniens, arguing that Paraguay was a more convenient location for the trial, but he did not succeed.

== Subsequent events ==
Following the judgment in Filártiga, there was a concern that the U.S. would evolve into a haven for international tort claims.

In Kadic v Karadžić (1995), victims of atrocities committed in Bosnia during the Bosnian War commenced proceedings against Serbia for war crimes in an American domestic court, with Radovan Karadžić being in the U.S. at the time. The United States Court of Appeals for the Second Circuit then considered issues as to the scope of ATS claims, specifically concerning non-state actors as defendants and the related question of whether genocide, war crimes and crimes against humanity require a state action. The Court of Appeals found that federal courts have subject matter jurisdiction under ATS even where defendants were not acting under "color of state law", when the allegations touched upon genocide, summary executions, torture and war crimes.

Following the Karadžić judgment, it was ruled in Sosa v. Alvarez-Machain 542 U.S. 692 (2004) that Congress intended with the Alien Tort Statute that extraterritorial jurisdiction was allowed for only the most egregious international crimes. This was further limited in Kiobel v. Royal Dutch Petroleum Co., where it was affirmed that there was a presumption against extraterritoriality and that "mere corporate presence" in the United States was not enough to overcome that presumption in cases where all the alleged wrongful acts were committed outside the United States by a foreign corporate defendant. The scope of ATS was more strictly limited to preclude foreign corporate defendants as parties in Jesner v. Arab Bank, PLC.

ATS claims have been limited to foreign national plaintiffs and did not provide jurisdiction for lawsuits against foreign governments who do not consent to jurisdiction. Eleven years after Filartiga, Congress enacted the Torture Victims Protection Act, creating a cause of action which, until then, had existed in the common law, however this too has been restricted in scope to individuals who torture or commit extrajudicial killings, and not to corporations or political associations like the Palestine Liberation Organization (see Mohamad v. Palestinian Authority).

Because individuals often don't have the means to pay large damage awards in these kinds of cases, the Seventh Circuit in Boim v. Quranic Literacy Institute gave voice to the idea that allowing claims to proceed against organizations and states that finance FTOs would "imperil the flow of money and discourage the financing of terrorist acts" by making it unprofitable. Other Congressional statutes enacted post-Filartiga have created other avenues to pursue claims against foreign governments like the Anti-Terrorism Act and amendments to the Foreign Sovereign Immunities Act that have broadened the scope of the types of property against which execution can be sought to satisfy judgments under FSIA's terrorism exception).

In 1992, Congress enacted the Anti-Terrorism Act (ATA) provided a private right of action that allows U.S. nationals to sue for injuries resulting from international terrorism. However in Sokolow v. Palestine Liberation Organization the Second Circuit dismissed the suit for lacking jurisdiction.

In 2019, Congress amended ATA with the Promoting Security and Justice for Victims of Terrorism Act of 2019 (PSJVTA) which specifically created a cause of action against the PLO and PA. In Fuld v. Palestine Liberation Organization the US Supreme Court ruled PSJVTA to be constitutional.

== See also ==
- One Man's War
