= Renewable energy sculpture =

Sculpture that produces renewable power

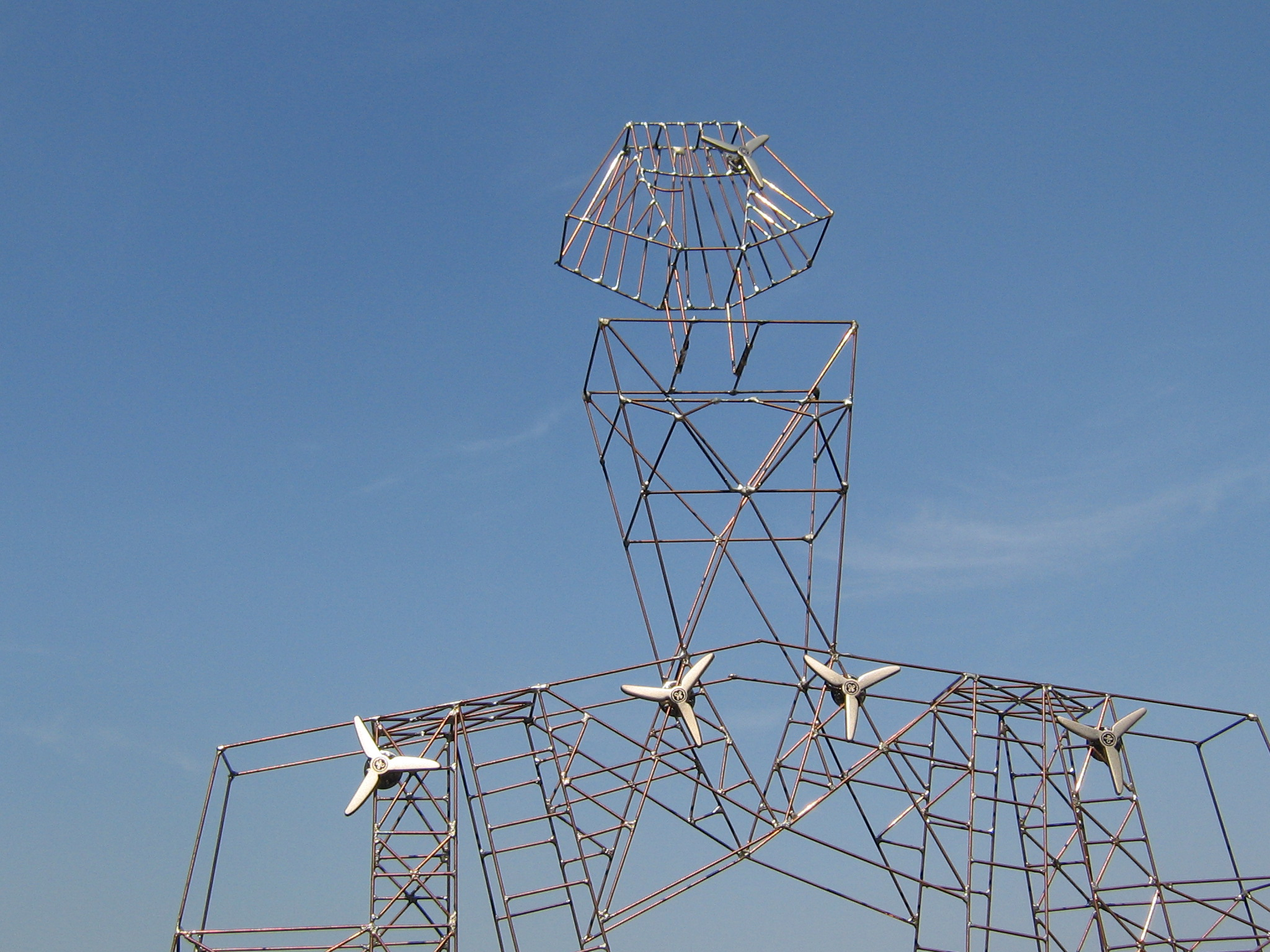
"Menina", a wind turbine sculpture model by artist Elena Paroucheva

A renewable energy sculpture is an artwork that produces power from renewable sources, such as solar, wind, geothermal, hydroelectric or tidal.

Such a sculpture is functionally both a renewable energy generator and a work of art, fulfilling utilitarian, aesthetic, and cultural functions. The idea of renewable energy sculptures has been developed by artists including Patrice Stellest, Hugo Pétigny, Sarah Hall, Julian H. Scaff, Patrick Marold, Elena Paroucheva, architects Laurie Chetwood and Nicholas Grimshaw, University of Illinois professor Bill Becket, and collaborations such as the Land Art Generator Initiative. Echoing the philosophy of the environmental art movement as a whole, artists creating renewable energy sculpture believe that the aesthetics of the artworks are inextricably linked to their ecological function.

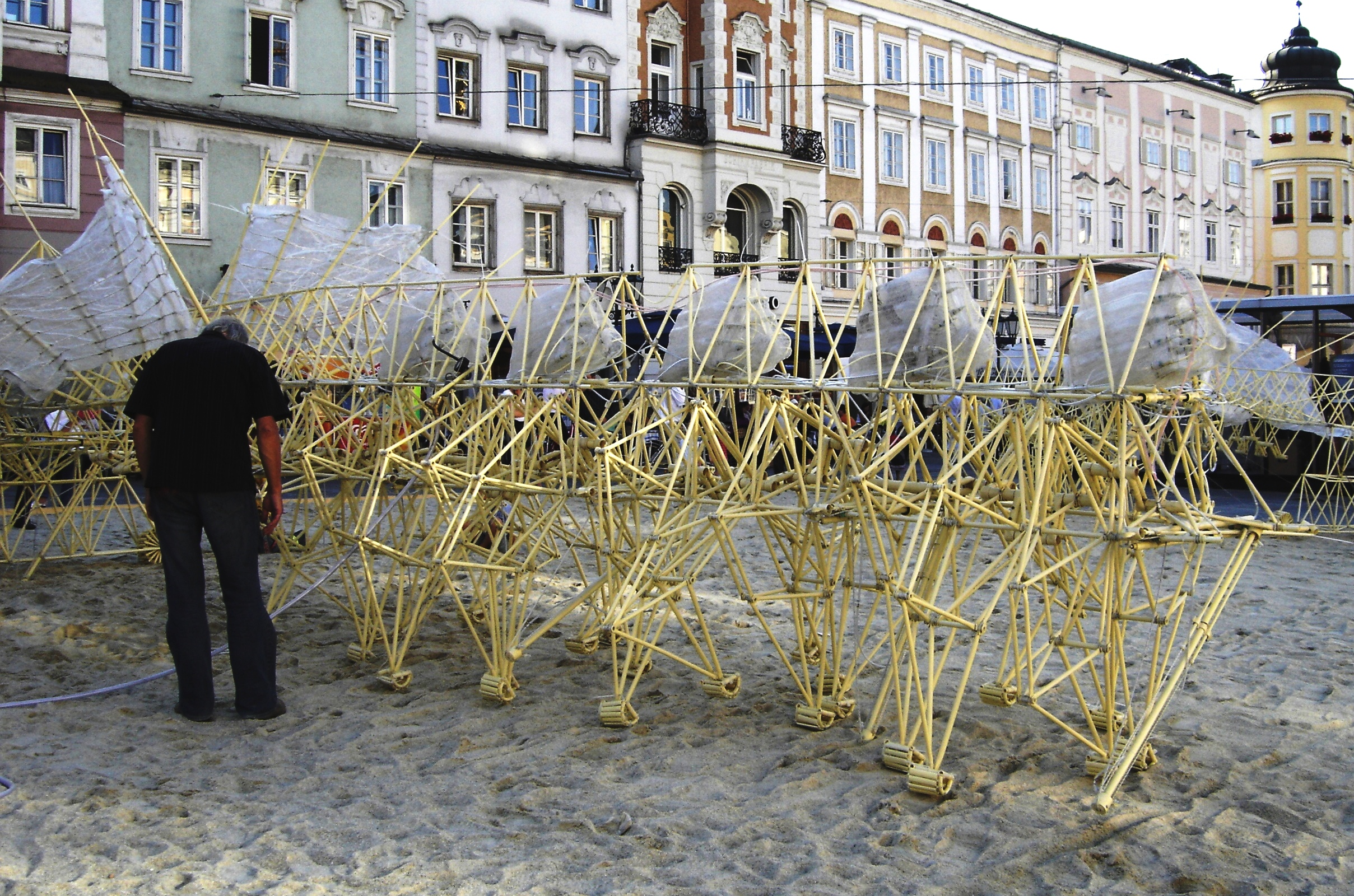
A strandbeest in 2005

In the Netherlands, Theo Jansen's mobile "strandbeest" sculptures which wander the beaches are well known. They are autonomous, many legged constructions wholly powered by the wind, and can course correct when their feet enter water without the use of electronics. They were first developed in the late 1980s as an attempt to use wind power to construct and reinforce dunes as a form of coastal defence. This was achieved by having the strandbeesten kick up sand as they moved along Dutch beaches, with the wind thereafter naturally accreting the sand into dunes. The iterations in operation today are primarily art pieces however.

== See also ==
- Sustainable art
- Environmental art
