= List of archives in Paraguay =

This is list of archives in Paraguay.

== Archives in Paraguay ==
- Archivo Nacional de Asunción
- Archives of Terror

== See also ==
- List of archives
- List of museums in Paraguay
- Culture of Paraguay
