= Martín Almada =

Paraguayan activist (1937–2024)

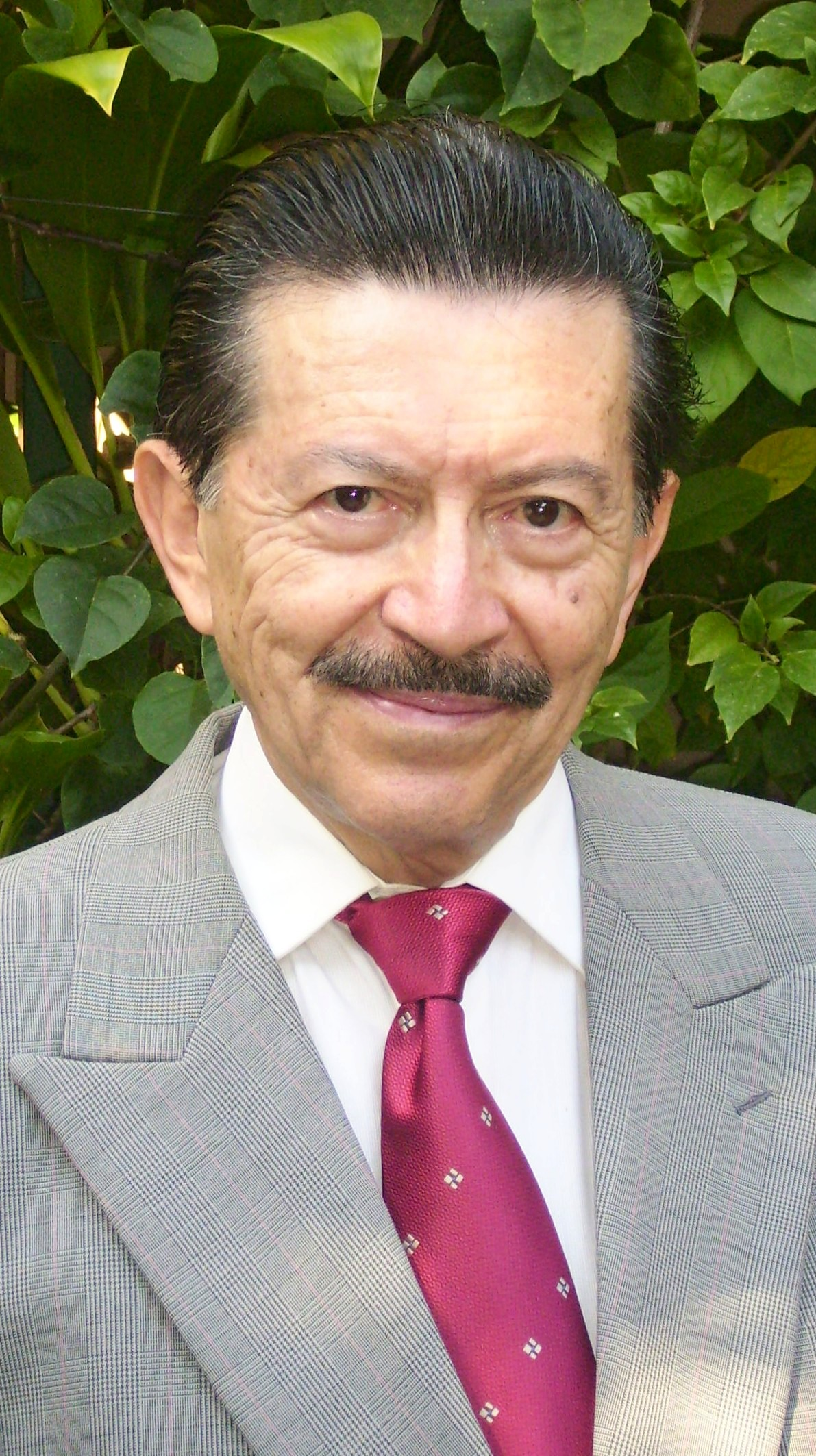
- Almada in 2008
- Born: 30 January 1937; Puerto La Esperanza, Paraguay
- Died: 30 March 2024 (aged 87)
- Education: National University of Asunción National University of La Plata
- Website: www.martinalmada.org

Martín Almada (30 January 1937 – 30 March 2024) was a Paraguayan lawyer, writer and educationalist. A noted dissident and human rights activist, he was imprisoned by the Alfredo Stroessner regime from 1974 to 1977. He was notable for uncovering the Archives of Terror in 1992, which documented repression by Stroessner's regime and proved the existence of Operation Condor.

== Biography ==
Almada was born in 1937 in Puerto La Esperanza, in the Alto Paraguay Department, but moved with his family to San Lorenzo, near the capital Asunción, when he was six. After he had finished his studies in educational science in 1963, he founded the educational institution "Juan Bautista Alberdi" in San Lorenzo and the "Centro de Animación Sociocultural". He then embarked on a law degree and graduated in 1968.

In 1972, he became the president of the Association of Educationalists of San Lorenzo, a local action group that received support from other sections of society and positioned itself in opposition to the dictatorship ruling Paraguay at the time.

=== Prisoner ===
At that time, Almada graduated from the University of La Plata in Argentina as a doctor of educational science. His thesis on education in his home country was sent to the government in Paraguay (an act of information exchange as part of Operation Condor). As a result, Almada's work was rejected by the regime of Alfredo Stroessner and he was imprisoned as a political prisoner in 1974, nearly tortured to death, and kept in prison for about three and a half years. His wife was killed (according to his book – after being tortured) as were two of his followers. His wife being under a house arrest, was forced to listen over the telephone to her husband's cries as he was tortured. She died after the political police falsely told her Martín had died and "presented" her a loincloth covered with blood with nails they said were used to remove his fingernails. In prison he increasingly grew anti-fascist and anti-imperialist.

=== Release ===
A campaign by Amnesty International resulted in Almada's release in 1977. Almada wrote in his book that this was facilitated by a wide range of organizations: the Committee of Churches of Paraguay, the Human Rights Commission of Paraguay, the Episcopal Conference of Paraguay and the World Council of Churches.

Almada went into exile with his mother and his children, at first in Panama and wrote a book Paraguay: The Forgotten Prison, the Country in Exile about torture he and, most importantly, others suffered and whose names and faces he well remembers, and the extensive network of corruption through which the country was "run" by a dictatorship dedicated to an absurd anti-communism in the practical absence of any communist movement worth speaking of, actually a mask for the suppression of any even marginally left-leaning idea or practice. In 2020, Almada was the subject of book Opération Condor written by French author Pablo Daniel Magee.

Almada's book has raised debate about human rights all over the world. In 1986, he worked for UNESCO until 1992, when he returned to Paraguay. There he concentrated on the publication of papers of the dictatorship that reveal its repression and torture and in 1992, he finally uncovered the Archives of Terror.

=== Archives of Terror ===
In 1992 Almada and his team discovered five tons of documents at the Department of Investigations, Lambaré which revealed dire practices of the Alfredo Stroessner dictatorship and links to the US government's CIA agents' involvement in Southern Cone countries at the time. He claimed that it had provided military assistance to ruling Paraguayan and Chilean regimes. After making the discovery, Almada, in the presence of many Paraguayan human rights advocates, farm and political leaders, made efforts to defend victims' rights to compensation and justice. Later in 1993 he also protested against allowing American assistance in cataloguing and microfilming the archive.

=== Death ===
Almada died on 30 March 2024, at the age of 87.

== Awards ==
Almada received several awards for his courage and work, including the prize "Antorcha a la libertad" of the Libre Foundation in Asunción in 1999 and the Right Livelihood Award in 2002.

== Paraguay: The Forgotten Prison, the Country in Exile ==
In his book he outlined names of 397 prisoners held at the Emboscada "Concentration Camp" in 1977–1979.

== Publications ==
- Paraguay: The Forgotten Prison, the Country in Exile, can be downloaded from Martín Almada's website. Versions are available in English, Italian and Spanish.

== See also ==
- Terror archives
- Operation Condor
