= Joel Filártiga =

Paraguayan physician and human rights activist (1932–2019)

- Born: Joel Holden Filártiga Ferreira; 15 August 1932; Ybytimí, Paraguarí, Paraguay
- Died: 5 July 2019 (aged 86); Asunción, Paraguay
- Occupations: Doctor, artist and human rights activist

Joel Holden Filártiga Ferreira (15 August 1932 – 5 July 2019) was a Paraguayan doctor, artist and human rights activist. He became known for his human rights activism after his son, Joelito Filártiga, was killed by the police during the dictatorship of Alfredo Stroessner in 1976.

== Biography ==
Filártiga was born in Ybytimí, Paraguarí, on 15 August 1932. He studied medicine at the National University of Asunción and at the Albert Einstein College of Medicine in New York City. He was a delegate of the Student Center of the Faculty of Medicine before the University Federation of Paraguay, from where he participated in the struggle against the dictatorship of Alfredo Stroessner.

Filártiga initially became known for offering health care to poor and indigenous peasants in a clinic that he opened in 1959 in the town of Ybycuí, in Paraguarí. Filártiga was also an artist. Several of his works were part of special presentations in Paraguay and abroad.

On 30 March 1976, Filártiga's son, Joelito, aged 17, was killed. Police claimed the murder was the result of a "crime of passion", committed by a neighborhood's policeman when he caught Joelito with his wife. However, it was later determined that Joelito was kidnapped by the police and tortured since his body exhibited marks of torture. The family Filártiga was opposed to Stroessner's regime and therefore was persecuted.

Filártiga fought for a long time for it to be acknowledged that his son had been murdered. In 1978, one of the main suspects, Américo Norberto Peña Irala, escaped to the United States. A daughter of Filártiga, Dolly, also went to the U.S. seeking exile. When she learned of Peña's presence in the country, the Filártiga family denounced him with the help of the Center for Constitutional Rights. In 1980, the U.S. justice ruled in favor of the Filártiga family, granting them compensation of US$10.4 million in Filártiga v. Peña-Irala.

He was portrayed by Anthony Hopkins in the 1991 television film One Man's War.

In November 2018, he was decorated by the Senate of Paraguay, which paid him a tribute for "his unwavering fight for health, freedom and justice."

Filártiga died on 5 July 2019 at the age of 86, in the Social Security Institute Hospital in Asunción.
