= One Man's War =

- Written by: Michael Carter; Sérgio Toledo
- Directed by: Sérgio Toledo
- Starring: Anthony Hopkins; Norma Aleandro; Fernanda Torres; Rubén Blades
- Music by: John E. Keane
- Country of origin: United Kingdom
- Original language: English

Production
- Producer: Ann Skinner
- Cinematography: Rodolfo Sánchez
- Editor: Laurence Méry-Clark
- Running time: 93 minutes
- Production companies: Channel 4, HBO Showcase, Skreba Films, TVS Films

Original release
- Release: 20 April 1991 (U.S.)

One Man's War is a 1991 television drama film set in Paraguay in 1976, under the dictatorship of General Alfredo Stroessner. It is based on the true story of Joel Filártiga (played by Anthony Hopkins), who sought justice for his son's death at the hands of Stroessner's secret police. The film stops before Filártiga launches the landmark international law case of Filártiga v. Peña-Irala (1980).

== Cast ==
- Anthony Hopkins as Joel Filártiga
- Norma Aleandro as Nidia
- Fernanda Torres as Dolly
- Leonardo García as Joelito
- Miah Michelle as Analy
- Ana Ofelia Murguia as Dona Teresa
- Jose Antonio Estrada as Leandro
- Rubén Blades as Horacio Galeano Perrone
- Sergio Bustamante as Gomes
- Rene Pereyra as Pena
- Claudia Guzman as Charo
- Rufino Echegoyen as Duarte
- Salvador Sanchez as Ramirez
- Malena Doria as Senora Ramirez
- Gerardo Quiroz as Ramirez's Son
- Farnesio de Bernal as Judge
- Guillermo Rios as Antonio
- Claudio Brook as Robledo
- Justo Martinez as Dr. Godoy
