= Archives of Terror =

Record of secret police activity in Latin America

The Archives of Terror (Spanish: Archivos del Terror) are a collection of documents chronicling the repression undertaken by Paraguayan dictator Alfredo Stroessner's secret police force during his rule from 1954 to 1989. The documents also proved the existence of Operation Condor, a US-backed campaign of state terror and political repression in South America, founded by the governments of Argentina, Bolivia, Chile, Paraguay and Uruguay, with Brazil, Peru and Ecuador joining later. The documents were originally found on 22 December 1992, by lawyer and human-rights activist Dr. Martín Almada, and judge José Agustín Fernández, in a police station in Lambaré, a suburb of Paraguayan capital Asunción. The documents have since been used in attempts to prosecute Chilean dictator Augusto Pinochet and in several human rights cases in Argentina and Chile.

The Truth and Justice Commission, established by the Paraguayan government in 2003, was able to compile from these archives and three other documentary sources, a list of 9,923 individuals who suffered 14,338 human rights violations, including detentions, tortures, executions, disappearances, and exiles. The commission's work also enabled the identification of an additional 10,167 victims omitted by the archives.

== Overview ==
Almada had been searching for years for documents to prove that he had been tortured by Alfredo Stroessner's military dictatorship in the 1970s. It was after being contacted by a woman who had information about possible evidence that he and Fernández discovered these archives, which described the fates of thousands of Latin Americans who had been secretly kidnapped, tortured, and killed by the security services of Argentina, Bolivia, Brazil, Chile, Paraguay, and Uruguay with cooperation of the CIA. This was known as Operation Condor.

Also revealed was a letter written by Manuel Contreras, head of the Chilean National Intelligence Directorate (DINA) at the time of writing, which invited Paraguayan intelligence officials to Santiago for a clandestine "First Working Meeting on National Intelligence" on 25 November 1975. This letter also placed intelligence chiefs from Argentina, Bolivia and Uruguay at the meetings, additionally solidifying those countries' involvement in the formation of Operation Condor. Other countries implicated in the archives include Peru (which joined Operation Condor in 1978 along with Ecuador), Venezuela, and Colombia, which cooperated, to various degrees, by providing intelligence information that had been requested by the security services of the Southern Cone countries. Some of these countries have used portions of the archives, now in Asunción's Palace of Justice, to prosecute former military officers. Much of the case built against Chilean General Augusto Pinochet by Spanish judge Baltasar Garzón was made using those archives. Almada, himself a victim of Condor, was twice interviewed by Baltasar Garzón.

"[The documents] are a mountain of ignominy, of lies, which Stroessner [Paraguay's dictator until 1989] used for 40 years to blackmail the Paraguayan people," states Almada. He wants the UNESCO to list the "terror archives" as an international cultural site, as this would greatly facilitate access to funding to preserve and protect the documents.

In May 2000, a UNESCO mission visited Asunción following a request from the Paraguayan authorities for help in putting these files on the Memory of the World Register, one element of a program aimed at safeguarding and promoting the documentary heritage of humanity to ensure that records are preserved and available for consultation.

== See also ==
- List of archives in Paraguay

== Bibliography ==
- Martín Almada, Paraguay: The Forgotten Prison, the Exiled Country
