= Julian H. Scaff =

Julian H. Scaff is a design director, educator, futurist, filmmaker, electronic musician and media artist from California. His areas of expertise include interaction design, user experience design, creative strategy and future studies.

He received his BA in Film and Video from Pitzer College, his MA in Film Critical Studies from UCLA, an MFA in Art and Design from the Dutch Art Institute , and a certificate in Human-Computer Interaction from MIT.

His recent work in interaction and user experience design include designing future technology for Hitachi, designing the first augmented reality experience for the Pasadena Rose Parade, and conversational interfaces leveraging artificial intelligence and machine learning. He has innovated scientific processes in the field of design, including the Curiosity Matrix that uses neuroscience to understand human motivations and adapting empirical methodology to the design process.

Julian has also shown his artwork and short digital movies in various galleries and film festivals around the world, and produced radio programs for ResonanceFM in London, Epsilonia Festival Radiophonique in Paris, and Voice of the People in Lebanon.

In 1997 Scaff founded and edited Strobe, which according to the UCLA Bruin was the first academic journal published exclusively on the internet. Contributions included articles by the famous film theorists Peter Wollen and Nick Browne.

Scaff also produced the first online version of the famous Walter Benjamin essay The Work of Art In The Age of Mechanical Reproduction, and Scaff's essay Art and Authenticity in the Age of Digital Reproduction has been widely referenced in cultural and media studies.

His film credits include The Cosmodrome Futurists, Genomatica, and Piles of dirt (film). He also starred in the film The Many Faces of Julian H. Scaff directed by Bob Recon. His recent film Tecopa which explores the site of a Native American massacre in California is featured at the Zonderling Media Art Festival in the Netherlands and has been garnering much attention in the media there.

His landscape art/design projects have included "Water, Trees, Path, Cranes" in Enschede, Netherlands, and "Dazzled Windscape," a proposal for making the controversial Cape Wind project in Nantucket Sound, Massachusetts more environmentally and culturally friendly.

Scaff is the design director at the digital agency Interactivism, and associate professor of Interaction Design at ArtCenter College of Design in Pasadena, California.

== Filmography for Julian H. Scaff ==
- Breukvlak: Tales of a Highway (2007)
- Tecopa (2006)
- Piles of Dirt (2006)
- Genomatica (2005) *
- Day of the Dead (2005)
- The Cosmodrome Futurists (2004)
- Desert Mosaic (2004)
- My Daily Commute (1996)

== Selected publications ==
- Glitchscapes (book)
- Sketch Your Soundscape (book)
- Experience Design Workbook (book, with Sofia M. Khan)
- Jamal & Damilola: A Nigerian Banking Scam Romance (book)
- Futureplexity: The Analog/Digital Architecture of Detroit Techno published in Cross-Reference Magazine, The Hague
- Quietscapes: Noise, Silence, and (Re)Designing the Public Sonosphere published in the journal Open, Rotterdam
- Sonic Notes from a Taipei Noodle Restaurant published in the journal Locus Sentio, Werkplaatstypogrfie, Arnhem, Netherlands
- Art and Authenticity in the Age of Digital Reproduction published by the Digital Arts Institute
