= 2021 local electoral calendar =

Local elections held in 2021

This local electoral calendar for 2021 lists the subnational elections held in 2021. Referendums, recall and retention elections, and national by-elections (special elections) are also included.

== January ==
- 5 January: United States, Georgia
  - U.S. Senate (2nd round)
  - U.S. Senate special election (2nd round)
  - Public Service Commission (2nd round)
- 7 January: Libya, Municipal Councils
- 10 January:
  - India, Himachal Pradesh, Municipal Councils and Town Councils
  - Kazakhstan, Regional Assemblies and Municipal Assemblies
- 11 January: Libya, Municipal Councils
- 11–12 January: Uganda, Sub-county and Municipal Councillors for Older Persons, Persons with Disabilities, and Youth
- 15 January: India, Maharashtra, Village Councils
- 16 January:
  - Bangladesh, Mayors and Municipal Councils (2nd phase)
  - Nigeria, Kano, Local Government Councils and Chairmen
- 16–29 January: Papua New Guinea, Bougainville, Parliament by-election
- 17 January: India, Himachal Pradesh, District Councils, Township Councils and Village Councils (1st phase)
- 19 January: India, Himachal Pradesh, District Councils, Township Councils and Village Councils (2nd phase)
- 20 January: Uganda, District Chairs, Lord Mayors, Mayors and District Councils
  - Kampala Capital City Authority, Lord Mayor and Council
- 21 January: India, Himachal Pradesh, District Councils, Township Councils and Village Councils (3rd phase)
- 23 January: Libya, Municipal Councils
- 24 January: Japan
  - Gifu, Governor
  - Yamagata, Governor
- 25 January:
  - Trinidad and Tobago, Tobago, House of Assembly
  - Uganda, Municipals Chairs and Municipal Councils
- 27 January:
  - Bangladesh, Chittagong, Mayor and City Corporation
  - Uganda, District Councillors for Older Persons, Persons with Disabilities, and Youth, and District Workers Representatives
- 28 January: India, Rajasthan, Ajmer Municipal Corporation, Municipal Councils and Town Councils
- 30 January: Bangladesh, Mayors and Municipal Councils (3rd phase)

== February ==
- 3 February: Uganda, Sub-county Chairs, Sub-county Councils, Municipal Division Chairs and Municipal Division Councils
- 6 February: Nigeria, Magama/Rijau Federal Constituency, House of Representatives by-election rerun
- 9 February: India, Andhra Pradesh, Village Councils (1st phase)
- 13 February: India, Andhra Pradesh, Village Councils (2nd phase)
- 14 February:
  - Bangladesh, Mayors and Municipal Councils (4th phase)
  - India, Punjab, Municipal Corporations, Municipal Councils and Town Councils
  - Spain, Catalonia, Parliament
- 17 February: India, Andhra Pradesh, Village Councils (3rd phase)
- 18 February: Australia, Lord Howe Island, Board
- 19 February: Pakistan, NA-45 and NA-75, National Assembly by-elections
- 21 February:
  - India
    - Andhra Pradesh, Village Councils (4th phase)
    - Gujarat, Municipal Corporations
      - Ahmedabad, Municipal Corporation
  - Laos, Provincial People's Councils
  - Pakistan, NA-221, National Assembly by-election
- 27 February: Nigeria, Yobe, Local Government Councils and Chairmen
- 28 February:
  - Austria, Carinthia, Mayors (1st round) and Municipal Councils
  - Bangladesh, Mayors and Municipal Councils (5th phase)
  - El Salvador, Mayors and Municipal Councils
  - India, Gujarat, Municipal Councils, District Councils and Township Councils

== March ==
- 2 March: Federated States of Micronesia, Chuuk, Governor, House of Representatives and Senate
- 3 March: Belize
  - Corozal Bay, House of Representatives by-election
  - City Councils and Town Councils
- 4 March: Kenya, Matungu Constituency, National Assembly by-election
- 6 March: Nigeria, Delta, Local Government Councils and Chairmen
- 7 March:
  - Bolivia, Governors, Departamental Legislative Assemblies, Mayors, Municipal Councils, Beni Provincial Subgovernors, Gran Chaco Regional Assembly and Tarija Sectional Executives
  - Switzerland
    - Basel-Landschaft, referendums
    - Bern, referendum
    - Geneva, referendum
    - Lucerne, referendums
    - Solothurn, Executive Council and Cantonal Council
    - Valais, Council of State and Grand Council
    - Zug, referendums
    - Zürich, referendums
  - Thailand, Nakhon Si Thammarat constituency 3, House of Representatives by-election
- 9 March: United States, Phoenix, City Council (2nd round)
- 10 March: India, Andhra Pradesh, Municipal Corporations and Municipal Councils (1st round)
- 13 March:
  - Australia
    - Norfolk Island, Regional Council
    - Western Australia, Legislative Assembly and Legislative Council
  - India, Andhra Pradesh, Municipal Corporations and Municipal Councils (2nd round)
  - Philippines, Palawan, provincial division plebiscite
- 14 March:
  - Austria, Carinthia, Mayors (2nd round)
  - Germany
    - Baden-Württemberg, Landtag
    - Hesse, County Councils, Mayors, Municipal Councils and Local Advisory Boards
      - Frankfurt, City Council and Borough Councils
    - Rhineland-Palatinate, Landtag
  - Honduras, Mayors and Municipal Councils
- 18 March: Kenya, Machakos, Senate by-election
- 20 March: United States
  - Louisiana's 2nd congressional district, U.S. House of Representatives special election
  - Louisiana's 5th congressional district, U.S. House of Representatives special election
- 21 March: Japan, Chiba, Governor
- 25 March: Canada, Newfoundland and Labrador, House of Assembly
- 27 March:
  - Nigeria
    - Aba North/Aba South Federal Constituency, House of Representatives by-election
    - Sokoto, Local Government Councils and Chairmen
  - India
    - Assam, Legislative Assembly (1st phase)
    - 27 March – 29 April: West Bengal, Legislative Assembly
- 28 March:
  - Switzerland, Valais, Council of State (2nd round)
  - Thailand, municipal elections
- 29 March: Antigua and Barbuda, Barbuda, Council

== April ==
- 1 April: India, Assam, Legislative Assembly (2nd phase)
- 4 April:
  - France, Pas-de-Calais's 6th constituency, National Assembly by-election (1st round)
  - Japan, Akita, Governor
- 6 April:
  - Greenland, Municipal Councils and Settlement Councils
  - India
    - Kerala, Legislative Assembly
    - Puducherry, Legislative Assembly
    - Tamil Nadu, Legislative Assembly
    - India, Assam, Legislative Assembly (3rd phase)
  - United States
    - Anchorage, Mayor special election
    - Colorado Springs, City Council
    - Oklahoma City, Council
    - St. Louis, Mayor and Board of Aldermen
    - Wisconsin, Superintendent of Public Instruction and Court of Appeals
- 7 April:
  - South Korea
    - Busan, Mayor by-election
    - Seoul, Mayor by-election
- 9 April: India, Meghalaya, Garo Hills Autonomous District, Council
- 10 April: Maldives, City Councils, Atoll Councils and Island Councils
- 11 April:
  - Bolivia, Governors (runoffs)
  - France, Pas-de-Calais's 6th constituency, National Assembly by-election (2nd round)
  - Kyrgyzstan, City Councils and Village Councils
- 12 April: Canada, Yukon, Legislative Assembly
- 17 April: Nigeria, Rivers, Local Government Councils and Chairmen
- 18 April:
  - Switzerland, Neuchâtel, Council of State and Grand Council
- 22 April: Isle of Man, Local Authority Commissioners and Local Authority Councils
- 25 April:
  - Japan
    - Hokkaido 2nd district, House of Representatives by-election
    - Nagano at-large district, House of Councillors by-election
  - Switzerland, Appenzell Innerrhoden, Landsgemeinde

== May ==
- 1 May:
  - Australia, Tasmania
    - House of Assembly
    - (Derwent, Mersey and Windermere) Legislative Council
  - United States, Texas
    - Texas's 6th congressional district, U.S. House of Representatives special election
    - Arlington, Mayor and City Council
    - Dallas, City Council
    - Fort Worth, Mayor and City Council
    - San Antonio, Mayor and City Council
- 2 May: Switzerland, Glarus, Landsgemeinde
- 4 May: Spain, Madrid, Assembly
- 6 May: United Kingdom, Country and local elections
  - Scotland, Parliament
  - Wales, Senedd
    - Police Commissioners
  - England, County Councils, Metropolitan Borough Councils, Unitary Authorities, District Councils, Mayors and Police Commissioners
    - Greater London, Mayor and Assembly
    - Bristol, Mayor and City Council
    - Buckinghamshire, Council
    - Cambridgeshire, Mayor and County Council
    - Cornwall, Council
    - Derbyshire, County Council
    - Devon, County Council
    - Durham, County Council
    - East Sussex, County Council
    - Essex, County Council
    - Gloucestershire, County Council
    - Greater Manchester, Mayor
      - Manchester, City Council
    - Hampshire, County Council
    - Hertfordshire, County Council
    - Isle of Wight, Council
    - Isles of Scilly, Council
    - Kent, County Council
    - Lancashire, County Council
    - Leicestershire, County Council
    - Lincolnshire, County Council
    - Liverpool City Region, Mayor
      - Liverpool, Mayor and City Council
    - Norfolk, County Council
    - Northamptonshire, County Council
    - Northumberland, County Council
    - Nottinghamshire, County Council
    - Oxfordshire, County Council
    - Shropshire, Council
    - Staffordshire, County Council
    - Suffolk, County Council
    - Surrey, County Council
    - Tees Valley City Region, Mayor
    - Warwickshire, County Council
    - West of England, Mayor
    - West Midlands, Mayor
    - West Sussex, County Council
    - West Yorkshire, Mayor
      - Leeds, City Council
    - Wiltshire, Council
    - Worcestershire, County Council
  - Hartlepool, House of Commons by-election
- 10 May: Canada, New Brunswick, Mayors and Municipal Councils
- 11 May: United States, Omaha, Mayor and City Council
- 13 May: United Kingdom, Airdrie and Shotts, House of Commons by-election
- 15 May: Slovakia, Governors and Regional Councils
- 15–16 May: Chile, Governors, Mayors and Municipal Councils
- 16 May:
  - Croatia, County Prefects, County Councils, Mayors and Municipal Councils (1st round)
    - Zagreb, Mayor and Assembly
    - Split, Mayor and Assembly
    - Rijeka, Mayor and Assembly
- 22 May: Nigeria, Oyo, Local Government Councils and Chairmen
- 23 May: Vietnam, Provincial People's Councils, District People's Councils and Communal People's Councils
- 29–30 May: France, Consular Advisors and Consular Delegates
- 30 May:
  - Croatia, County Prefects, County Councils, Mayors and Municipal Councils (2nd round)
    - Zagreb, Mayor and Assembly
    - Split, Mayor and Assembly
    - Rijeka, Mayor and Assembly
- 31 May: Somaliland, Mayors and District Councils

== June ==
- 1 June: United States, New Mexico's 1st congressional district, U.S. House of Representatives special election
- 5 June:
  - Ethiopia, Regional Councils, City Councils, District Councils and Neighborhood Councils
  - Latvia, Municipal Councils
  - United States, Cherokee Nation, Tribal Council
- 6 June:
  - Argentina, Misiones, Chamber of Deputies
  - Germany, Saxony-Anhalt, Landtag
  - Mexico, State elections and local elections
    - Aguascalientes, Congress, Mayors, Trustees and Municipal Councils
    - Baja California, Governor, Congress, Mayors and Municipal Councils
    - Baja California Sur, Governor, Congress, Mayors, Trustees and Municipal Councils
    - Campeche, Governor, Congress, Mayors, Trustees and Municipal Councils
    - Chiapas, Congress, Mayors, Trustees and Municipal Councils
    - Chihuahua, Governor, Congress, Mayors, Trustees and Municipal Councils
    - Coahuila, Mayors, Trustees and Municipal Councils
    - Colima, Governor, Congress, Mayors, Trustees and Municipal Councils
    - Durango, Congress
    - Guanajuato, Congress, Mayors, Trustees and Municipal Councils
    - Guerrero, Governor, Congress, Mayors, Trustees and Municipal Councils
    - Hidalgo, Congress
    - Jalisco, Congress, Mayors, Trustees and Municipal Councils
    - Mexico City, Congress and Mayors
    - Mexico State, Congress, Mayors, Trustees and Municipal Councils
    - Michoacán, Governor, Congress, Mayors and Municipal Councils
    - Morelos, Congress, Mayors, Trustees and Municipal Councils
    - Nayarit, Governor, Congress, Mayors, Trustees and Municipal Councils
    - Nuevo León, Governor, Congress, Mayors and Municipal Councils
    - Oaxaca, Congress, Mayors, Trustees and Municipal Councils
    - Puebla, Congress, Mayors, Trustees and Municipal Councils
    - Querétaro, Governor, Congress, Mayors, Trustees and Municipal Councils
    - Quintana Roo, Mayors, Trustees and Municipal Councils
    - San Luis Potosí, Governor, Congress, Mayors, Trustees and Municipal Councils
    - Sinaloa, Governor, Congress, Mayors and Municipal Councils
    - Sonora, Governor, Congress, Mayors, Trustees and Municipal Councils
    - Tabasco, Congress, Mayors, Trustees and Municipal Councils
    - Tamaulipas, Congress, Mayors, Trustees and Municipal Councils
    - Tlaxcala, Governor, Congress, Mayors, Trustees and Municipal Councils
    - Veracruz, Congress, Mayors, Trustees and Municipal Councils
    - Yucatán, Congress, Mayors, Trustees and Municipal Councils
    - Zacatecas, Governor, Congress, Mayors, Trustees and Municipal Councils
- 13 June:
  - Finland, Municipal Councils
- 17 June:
  - United Kingdom, Chesham and Amersham, House of Commons by-election
- 18 June: Iran, City Councils and Village Councils
  - Tehran, City Council
- 19 June: Nigeria, Gwaram Federal Constituency, House of Representatives by-election
- 20 June:
  - France, Regional Councils and Departmental Councils (1st round)
  - Japan, Shizuoka, Governor
- 23 June: Morocco, Regional Councils and Municipal Councils
- 26 June: Canada, Akwesasne, Mohawk Council
- 27 June:
  - Argentina, Jujuy, Chamber of Deputies
  - France, Regional Councils and Departmental Councils (2nd round)
  - Nigeria, Jigawa, Local Government Councils and Chairmen

== July ==
- 1 July: United Kingdom, Batley and Spen, House of Commons by-election
- 4 July: Japan, Tokyo, Metropolitan Assembly
- 8 July: Ireland, Dublin Bay South, Dáil Éireann by-election
- 18 July: Japan, Hyōgo, Governor
- 24 July:
  - Nigeria
    - Ogun, Local Government Councils and Chairmen
    - Lagos, Local Government Councils and Chairmen
- 25 July:
  - Cambodia, Bokor, City Council
  - Kazakhstan, Rural Heads
  - Pakistan, Azad Kashmir, Legislative Assembly

== August ==
- 12 August: Zambia, Mayors, District Councils, Council Chairs and Municipal Councils
- 14 August: Nigeria, Lere Federal Constituency, House of Representatives by-election
- 15 August: Argentina, Salta, Chamber of Deputies, Senate and Constitutional Convention
- 17 August: Canada, Nova Scotia, General Assembly
- 22 August: Japan, Yokohama, Mayor
- 28 August: Australia, Northern Territory, Mayors, City Councils, Town Councils, Regional Councils and Shire Councils
- 29 August: Argentina, Corrientes, Governor, Chamber of Deputies, and Senate

== September ==
- 4 September: Nigeria, Kaduna, Local Government Councils and Chairmen (1st stage)
- 5 September: Japan, Ibaraki, Governor
- 11 September: Australia, Northern Territory, Daly by-election
- 12 September: Germany, Lower Saxony, County Administrators, County Councils, Mayors, Municipal Councils and Local Councils (1st round)
  - Hanover Region, President (1st round) and Assembly
    - Hanover, City Council and Borough Councils
- 13 September: Norway, Sámi Parliament
- 14 September: United States, California, Gubernatorial recall election
- 19 September:
  - Moldova, Gagauzia, People's Assembly
  - Russia, Federal Subject Heads, Federal Subject Legislatures, Municipal Heads, Municipal Councils, District Councils, Village Councils and Local referendums
    - Adygea, State Council
    - Altai Krai, Legislative Assembly
    - Amur Oblast, Legislative Assembly
    - Astrakhan Oblast, Duma
    - Belgorod Oblast, Governor special election
    - Chechnya, Head and Parliament
    - Chukotka Autonomous Okrug, Duma
    - Chuvashia, State Council
    - Dagestan, People's Assembly
    - Ingushetia, People's Assembly
    - Jewish Autonomous Oblast, Legislative Assembly
    - Kaliningrad Oblast, Duma
    - Kamchatka Krai, Legislative Assembly
    - Karelia (Republic), Legislative Assembly
    - Khabarovsk Krai, Governor special election
    - Khanty-Mansi Autonomous Okrug, Duma
    - Kirov Oblast, Legislative Assembly
    - Krasnoyarsk Krai, Legislative Assembly
    - Kursk Oblast, Duma
    - Leningrad Oblast, Legislative Assembly
    - Lipetsk Oblast, Council of Deputies
    - Mordovia, Head special election and State Assembly
    - Moscow Oblast, Duma
    - Murmansk Oblast, Duma
    - Nizhny Novgorod Oblast, Legislative Assembly
    - Novgorod Oblast, Duma
    - Omsk Oblast, Legislative Assembly
    - Orenburg Oblast, Legislative Assembly
    - Oryol Oblast, Council of People's Deputies
    - Perm Krai, Legislative Assembly
    - Primorsky Krai, Legislative Assembly
    - Pskov Oblast, Assembly of Deputies
    - Saint Petersburg, Legislative Assembly
    - Samara Oblast, Duma
    - Stavropol Krai, Duma
    - Sverdlovsk Oblast, Legislative Assembly
    - Tambov Oblast, Duma
    - Tomsk Oblast, Duma
    - Tula Oblast, Governor
    - Tuva, Head
    - Tver Oblast, Governor and Legislative Assembly
    - Tyumen Oblast, Duma
    - Ulyanovsk Oblast, Governor
    - Vologda Oblast, Legislative Assembly
- 25 September: Nigeria, Kaduna, Local Government Councils and Chairmen (2nd stage)
- 26 September:
  - Austria, Upper Austria, Parliament, Mayors and Municipal Councils
  - Austria, Graz, Municipal council election
  - Germany
    - Berlin, House of Representatives, Expropriate Deutsche Wohnen and Co referendum
    - Lower Saxony, County Administrators and Mayors (2nd round)
      - Hanover Region, President (2nd round)
    - Mecklenburg-Vorpommern, Landtag
  - Portugal
    - Municipal Chambers, Municipal Assemblies, Parish Assemblies
- 27 September: Canada, Newfoundland and Labrador, Mayors and City Councils
- 30 September: Ethiopia, Southern Nations, Nationalities, and Peoples Region, Regionalization referendum

== October ==
- 2 October: Georgia, Mayors and Municipal Councils
- 3–4 October: Italy, Local elections (1st round)
  - Calabria, President and Regional Council
  - Bologna, Mayor and City Council
  - Milan, Mayor, City Council, Borough Presidents and Borough Councils
  - Naples, Mayor and City Council
  - Rome, Mayor and City Council
  - Turin, Mayor and City Council
- 6 October: Nigeria, Nasarawa, Local Government Councils and Chairmen
- 8 October: New Zealand, Christchurch, Coastal Ward by-election
- 9 October:
  - Nigeria, Plateau, Local Government Councils and Chairmen
- 10 October: Paraguay, Mayors and Municipal Boards
- 13 October: Saint Helena, Ascension and Tristan da Cunha, Saint Helena, Legislative Council
- 14–27 October: Germany, Bavaria, Parliament recall referendum
- 16 October: Australia
  - Christmas Island, Shire Council
  - Cocos (Keeling) Islands, Shire Council
  - Western Australia, Mayors, Regional Councils, City Councils and Shire Councils
- 17 October:
  - Estonia, Municipal Councils
  - Kosovo, Mayors and Municipal Councils
  - North Macedonia, Mayors and Municipal Councils
- 17–18 October: Italy, Local elections (2nd round).
- 18 October: Canada, Alberta, Referendum and Mayors and Municipal Councils
  - Calgary, Mayor, City Council and School Trustees
  - Edmonton, Mayor, City Council and School Trustees
- 25 October: Canada, Nunavut, Legislative Assembly
- 25 October: Somalia, Puntland, Municipal elections
- 31 October: Japan, Miyagi, Governor

== November ==
- 1 November: South Africa, District Councils, Metropolitan Councils and Local Councils
- 2 November: United States, State and Local elections
  - Ohio's 11th congressional district, U.S. House of Representatives special election
  - Ohio's 15th congressional district, U.S. House of Representatives special election
  - New Jersey, Governor, General Assembly and Senate
  - Pennsylvania, Commonwealth Court and Superior Court retention elections, and Supreme Court, Superior Court and Commonwealth Court
  - Virginia, Governor, Lieutenant Governor, Attorney General and House of Delegates
  - Washington, Court of Appeals
  - Albuquerque, Mayor and City Council
  - Atlanta, Mayor and City Council
  - Aurora, CO, City Council
  - Boston, Mayor and City Council
  - Cincinnati, Mayor and City Council
  - Cleveland, Mayor and City Council
  - Detroit, Mayor and City Council
  - King County, Executive and Council
    - Seattle, Mayor, City Attorney, and City Council
  - Miami, Mayor and City Commission
  - Minneapolis, Mayor and City Council
  - New York City, Mayor, Comptroller, Public Advocate, City Council and Borough Presidents
  - Pittsburgh, Mayor and City Council
  - Tucson, City Council
  - Wichita, City Council
- 6 November: Nigeria, Anambra, Governor
- 7 November:
  - Canada, Quebec, Mayors and Municipal Councils
    - Montreal, Mayor and City Council
    - Quebec City, Mayor and City Council
  - Switzerland, Fribourg, Council of State (1st round) and Grand Council
- 13 November: United States, New Orleans, Mayor and City Council (2nd round)
- 14 November:
  - Argentina
    - Buenos Aires, Chamber of Deputies and Senate
    - Buenos Aires City, Legislature
    - Catamarca, Chamber of Deputies and Senate
    - Chaco, Chamber of Deputies
    - Formosa, Chamber of Deputies
    - La Rioja, Chamber of Deputies
    - Mendoza, Chamber of Deputies and Senate
    - San Luis, Chamber of Deputies and Senate
    - Santiago del Estero, Governor and Chamber of Deputies
  - Japan, Hiroshima, Governor
  - Kosovo, Mayors (2nd round)
- 15 November: China, Beijing, Haidian District People's Congress
- 16 November:
  - Denmark, Regional Councils and Municipal Councils
  - Liberia, Bomi-1, Bong-2, Grand Gedeh-1, and Nimba-1, House of Representatives by-elections
- 20 November: Malaysia, Malacca, Legislative Assembly
- 21 November:
  - Central African Republic, Municipal Councils (1st round)
  - Chile, Regional Councils
  - Haiti, Local and Municipal
  - Venezuela, Governors and Legislative Councils of states, Mayors and Municipal Councils
- 25 November:
  - Dominica, Grand Bay Constituency, House of Assembly by-election
  - United Kingdom, North Yorkshire, Police, Fire and Crime Commissioner by-election
- 27 November: Algeria, Local councils
- 28 November:
  - Switzerland, Fribourg, Council of State (2nd round)
  - Thailand, Subdistrict Administrative Organisations

== December ==
- 1 December: China, Jiangsu, Local People's Congress
- 2 December: United Kingdom, Old Bexley and Sidcup, House of Commons by-election
- 4 December:
  - Australia, New South Wales, Mayors, Regional Councils, City Councils and Shire Councils
  - Nigeria, Ekiti, Local Government Councils and Chairmen
- 6 December: Tobago, Tobago House of Assembly
- 16 December: United Kingdom, North Shropshire, House of Commons by-election
- 18 December: Malaysia, Sarawak, Legislative Assembly
- 21 December: Bhutan, Municipal Councils

== See also ==
- 2021 United States ballot measures
