= Redistribution (Australia) =

Redistribution of electoral boundaries in Australia

In Australia, a redistribution is the process of redrawing the boundaries of electoral divisions for the House of Representatives arising from changes in population and/or the number of representatives. There are no redistributions for the Senate as each state constitutes an at-large electorate with multiple members (senators). The Australian Electoral Commission (AEC), an independent statutory authority, oversees the apportionment and redistribution process for federal electorates, taking into account an array of demographic and geographic factors. Politicians, parties and the general public may make submissions to the AEC on proposed boundaries, but any interference with their deliberations is considered a serious offence. The AEC’s decisions on boundary changes are final, and cannot be rejected or amended by the parliament. To do so would require an amendment to the electoral act itself; however, no government has ever altered the act with the intent of interfering in the redistribution process. In this way, partisan gerrymandering is widely regarded as a non-issue in Australian federal politics.

Section 24 of the Constitution of Australia specifies that the number of members of the House of Representatives in each state is to be calculated based upon their population, although each state is entitled to a minimum of five members regardless of population. This minimum condition currently only applies to Tasmania, the smallest state. Representation of territories has been specified by supplemental legislation. After the number of members for each state and territory is determined, in a process called apportionment or determination, they are divided into a corresponding number of electoral divisions.

A redistribution (sometimes called redrawing or "revision") of the geographic boundaries of divisions in a state or territory takes place when an apportionment determination results in a change in the number of seats to which a state or territory is entitled, at least once every seven years, or earlier when the AEC determines that population shifts within a state or territory have caused some seats to have too many or too few voters. The Commonwealth Electoral Act 1918 requires that all electoral divisions within a state or territory have approximately an equal numbers of enrolled voters. The Commonwealth Electoral Act (No. 2) 1973 reduced the allowed variation of electors in each division to 10% of the state or territory's average, down from 20%. New boundaries apply only to general elections held after the redistribution process has been finalised, and by-elections are held based on the previous electoral boundaries.

Each state and territory has its own electoral commission which follows similar but not identical processes and principles for determining boundaries and conducting elections within their jurisdiction, and those of local governments.

== Redistribution triggers ==
Section 59 of the Commonwealth Electoral Act 1918 outlines the timing on when redistribution should commence.

A redistribution of divisions in a State, the ACT or Northern Territory is required or triggered in three circumstances:

- if there has been a change in the number of parliamentary representatives to which the State or Territory is entitled, due to a change in population or an increase in the overall number of members, subject to the minimum number of divisions in original States. Under Sections 46 and 48 of the Act, these are determined by the Electoral Commissioner within 13 months after every first meeting of the House of Representatives ("determination").
- if the number of electors in more than one third of the divisions in the State or one of the divisions in the Territory deviates from the respective State/Territory's average divisional enrolment by more than 10% for a period of more than two months ("malapportionment")
- if seven years has elapsed since the previous redistribution

However, despite the above requirements or triggers, a redistribution is not to commence in a State, the ACT or Northern Territory in two circumstances:

- if a redistribution of divisions is already undergoing in the State or Territory, otherwise the new redistribution would terminate the undergoing redistribution
- if it is within the twelve month period prior to the expiration of the House of Representatives.

For the latter circumstance, if the elapse of seven years since the previous redistribution falls within the twelve month period, the redistribution will instead be automatically deferred and commence within 30 days after the first meeting of the next House of Representatives. This is to prevent a general election from occurring while a redistribution is in progress.

Section 59 also states three additional circumstances:

- if a redistribution is triggered in a State or Territory anytime within 13 months after the first meeting of House of Representatives met (any of the triggers, including within 30 days after the first House of Representatives meeting as above)
- the determination of the seat entitlement has not been made yet (which has to be 12–13 months after the first sitting)
- the three-person Electoral Commission makes a judgement that there may be a change in seat entitlement for the State or Territory

If all of the three requirements are met, then the Electoral Commission can decide to defer the redistribution for the State and Territory until after the seat entitlement has been determined.

=== Example of redistribution deferrals ===
From the above legislative requirements, this means that a redistribution can be deferred up to two times. An example of this was the redistribution in the ACT between 2012–2014. ACT had a redistribution on 9 December 2005, which meant that the following scheduled redistribution was to start around December 2012. The first House of Representatives sitting of the 43rd Parliament was on 27 September 2010, meaning the House of Representatives was due to expire on 27 September 2013. December 2012 fell within the twelve month period prior to the expiration (27 September 2012 to 27 September 2013), which meant that the scheduled redistribution was automatically deferred to within 30 days after the first House of Representatives sitting in the 44th Parliament.

The 44th Parliament eventually began on 12 November 2013. Within the following 30 days, the Electoral Commission made a judgement that there was possibility of a change in seat entitlement for ACT. The Commission then chose to defer the redistribution again until the determination could be made in another twelve months time (November–December 2014). The redistribution for ACT finally commenced in December 2014, two years after its scheduled commencement.

=== Malapportionment ===
Under Section 58 of the Commonwealth Electoral Act 1918, after the end of every month, the Electoral Commissioner is to ascertain (on the same day):

- the number of electors enrolled in each division (in respect of each State/Territory)
- the average divisional enrolment of each State/Territory (i.e. total enrolment of the State/Territory divided by the number of the divisions in the State/Territory)
- the percentage deviation between the above two for each division

These numbers are required to be published in the Gazette monthly. Ascertainments are based on existing divisions and includes any finalised redistributed boundaries and created divisions at the time of ascertainment. An example of this is the gazette published in November 2024 for the number of electors as of 31 October 2024. The redistributions and boundaries for New South Wales, Victoria and Western Australia had just recently been finalised within the month prior. The October 2024 ascertainment included the new seat of Bullwinkel and excluded the abolished seats of Higgins and North Sydney, even though these would not come into effect until the 2025 election.

Under Section 59 of the Commonwealth Electoral Act, if the number of electors in more than one third of the divisions in a State or one of the divisions in a Territory deviates from the respective State/Territory's average divisional enrolment by more than 10% for a period of more than two months, this is considered malapportionment and is one of the three possible triggers for redistribution for that State or Territory.

== Total number of members ==
Section 24 of the Constitution specifies that the total number of members of the House of Representatives shall be "as nearly as practicable" twice as many as the number of senators. High Court rulings have later interpreted this section of the Constitution to apply to state members and senators. However, the principle of the House of Representatives roughly double of the Senate can still be applied when including territory members and senators.

As there are 72 state senators, there should be roughly 144 state members of the House of Representatives. When including the 4 territory senators, there should be roughly 152 members of the House of Representatives. The total number of members of the House of Representatives, and consequently electorates, varies from time to time. Every time there is a change in the number of members, a redistribution is required to be undertaken, except in Tasmania which has always had the constitutional minimum number of five members. At the first federal election, there were 75 members of the House of Representatives (for 65 divisions). In 1949, the number was increased from 74 to 121 (excluding the Australian Capital Territory and the Northern Territory), and in 1984 it was increased from 125 to 148. Following the 2017 apportionment, the total number of members increased from 150 to 151, which was reversed following the 2023 apportionment.

== Entitlement of states and territories ==
The AEC determines the number of members to which each state and territory is entitled, which is based on the population of each state and territory. The day when it is exactly one year and one day after the first sitting day for a new House of Representatives is known as the "reference day". On this day (or the next earliest weekday if the reference day is a weekend or public holiday in the ACT), the Electoral Commissioner ascertains the most recent population estimate for each state and territory from the Australian Bureau of Statistics, in a process termed "ascertainment". Based on these figures, the AEC then makes its apportionment determination ("determination"), which is to be done "as soon as possible" after the ascertainment .The absolute latest a determination could be made is one month after the ascertainment.

Section 24 of the Constitution requires that electorates be apportioned among the states in proportion to their respective populations; provided that each Original State has at least 5 members. Section 29 of the Constitution forbids electorate boundaries from crossing state lines. The current apportionment method is now found in section 48 of the Commonwealth Electoral Act 1918.

Under the current method, the AEC firstly calculates a quota, as follows:

$$\mbox{Quota} = \frac{\mbox{Total population of the six states}}{\mbox{Number of senators for the states x 2} }$$

=== State entitlements ===
After the quota is calculated, the number of members to be chosen in each State is the number of people of the State divided by the quota, and if on such division there is a remainder greater than one-half of the quota, one more member shall be chosen in the State.

$$\mbox{Quotient of each state} = \frac{\mbox{Population of each state  }}{\mbox{Quota} }$$

In simpler terms, the entitlement of each state is the quotient rounded to the nearest whole number. However, each Original State is entitled to a minimum of five members under the Australian Constitution, thus giving Tasmania two more seats than its population would normally justify.

=== Territory entitlements ===
Until 2020, the quotient and entitlement of each territory was obtained using a similar rounding method to the one used for the states. In 2003, a statistical error margin — equal to twice the standard error of the population estimate, as provided by the Australian Bureau of Statistics — was added to the quotient for each territory. The quotient and the error margin were added and rounded to the nearest whole number to determine the entitlement for each territory.

These provisions enabled the Northern Territory to retain its second seat at the 2004 federal election, and the Australian Capital Territory to gain a third seat at the 2019 federal election.

The Electoral Amendment (Territory Representation) Act 2020, passed on 9 December 2020, amended the Commonwealth Electoral Act 1918 to additionally apply the harmonic mean method in calculating each territory's entitlement; the method is also known as Dean’s Method. The inclusion of the statistical error margin was also abolished.

The calculation of the territory's quotient is first determined in the same way used for state entitlement:

$$\mbox{Quotient of each territory} = \frac{\mbox{Population of each territory  }}{\mbox{Quota} }$$

In accordance with Section 48 of the Commonwealth Electoral Act 1918, the calculation of the entitlement of each territory varies on the quotient calculated:

- If the quotient is less than or equal to 0.5, then the territory is not entitled to have any members in the House of Representatives, except in the case of the Northern Territory and Australian Capital Territory (both are entitled to a minimum of one member each).
- If the quotient is greater than 0.5, but less than or equal to 1, the territory is entitled to one member in the House of Representatives.
- If the quotient is more than 3, then the entitlement of the territory is the quotient rounded to the nearest whole number (the same method as state entitlement).
- If the quotient is more than 1, but less than or equal to 3, the entitlement is calculated via the harmonic mean method below. If the quotient is larger than its corresponding harmonic mean, then the entitlement is the quotient rounded up to the nearest whole number; otherwise, the entitlement is the quotient rounded down to the nearest whole number.

$$\mbox{Minimum number of members} = \mbox{Quotient rounded down to the nearest whole number}$$

$$\mbox{Harmonic mean} = \frac{\mbox{2 x Minimum number of members x (Minimum number of members + 1)}}{\mbox{Minimum number of members + (Minimum number of members + 1)} }$$

Quotient	Minimum number of members	Harmonic mean	Seat Entitlement
1 to 1.3332	1	1.3333	1
1.3333 to 2	1	1.3333	2
2 to 2.39	2	2.4000	2
2.40 to 3	2	2.4000	3

Under these new rules adopted in December 2020, the Northern Territory, with a quota of 1.4332, will retain two seats at the 2022 Australian federal election. It would have lost one of these seats under the AEC determination made in July 2020.

The entitlement calculation applies to every territory of Australia except Jervis Bay Territory, which is taken to be part of the Australian Capital Territory. If the territory of Norfolk Island is not entitled to a seat, its population is added to the Australian Capital Territory for an adjusted calculation of the latter's quotient. Similarly, if either or both the territories of Christmas Island and Coco (Keeling) Islands is not entitled to a seat, the island's (or both islands') population is added to the Northern Territory for an adjusted calculation of the latter's quotient. As of 2024, Norfolk Island is part of the Australian Capital Territory's Division of Bean, while Christmas Island and Coco (Keeling) Islands are part of the Northern Territory's Division of Lingiari.

== Apportionments ==
=== 2023 apportionment ===
The latest apportionment determination was made in July 2023. Following its timeline, the AEC on 27 July 2023 announced an apportionment determination based on the population figures for December 2022. The determination resulted in a reduction of one seat in New South Wales to 46, a reduction of one seat in Victoria to 38 and an increase of one seat in Western Australia to 16. The total number of seats in the House of Representatives will decrease from 151 to 150 at the 2025 Australian federal election.

State or territory	Population December 2022 ('000)	Seats	Change
New South Wales	8,238.8	46	▼1
Victoria	6,704.2	38	▼1
Queensland	5,378.2	30	Steady
Western Australia	2,825.1	16	▲1
South Australia	1,834.2	10	Steady
Tasmania	571.5	5	Steady
State total	25,552.4	145	▼1
Australian Capital Territory	461.1	3	Steady
Northern Territory	250.1	2	Steady
Other	4.8	-	
Total	26,268.5	150	▼1

=== 2020 apportionment ===
On 18 June 2020, the Bureau of Statistics had provided the AEC with population figures for December 2019. In the 2020 apportionment, Western Australia lost a seat to 15 seats and Victoria gained a seat to 39. Under the determination, the Northern Territory would have lost one of its two seats. However, an amendment in December 2020 changed the method for determining the apportionment for the territories, which had the effect of reversing the loss of the seat for the Northern Territory. The number of seats by States in the House of Representatives arising from the 2020 determination, with the change in law relating to the territories, were as follows:

State or territory	Population June 2020 ('000)	Seats	Change
New South Wales	8,164.1	47	Steady
Victoria	6,694.9	39	▲1
Queensland	5,174.4	30	Steady
Western Australia	2,661.9	15	▼1
South Australia	1,769.3	10	Steady
Tasmania	540.6	5	Steady
State total	25,005.2	146	Steady
Australian Capital Territory	431.1	3	Steady
Northern Territory	246.0	2	Steady
Other	4.7	-	
Total	25,687.0	151	Steady

The population quota is 173,647 (25,005,200 divided by 144). The resulting redistributions must take place by July 2021 for them to be in place in time for the 2022 federal election, due by May 2022.

=== 2017 apportionment ===
The first sitting of the House of Representatives following the July 2016 election took place on 31 August 2016, and the three-year term was scheduled to expire on 29 August 2019. Following its timeline, the AEC on 31 August 2017 announced an apportionment determination following the completion of processing of the 2016 census. The determination resulted in a reduction of one seat in South Australia to 10, an increase of one seat in Victoria to 38 and an additional seat in the ACT to 3. The total number of seats in the House of Representatives increased from 150 to 151 at the 2019 federal election. The number of seats by States in the House of Representatives arising from the 2017 determination were as follows:

State or territory	Seats	Change
New South Wales	47	Steady
Victoria	38	▲1
Queensland	30	Steady
Western Australia	16	Steady
South Australia	10	▼1
Tasmania	5	Steady
Australian Capital Territory	3	▲1
Northern Territory	2	Steady
Total	151	▲1

A draft redistribution in Victoria was released on 6 April 2018, and the final distribution was released on 12 July. There were also three scheduled redistributions of electoral boundaries, as seven years had elapsed since the last time these boundaries were reviewed.

=== 2014 apportionment ===
On 13 November 2014, the AEC made an apportionment determination that resulted in Western Australia's entitlement increasing from 15 to 16 seats, and New South Wales's decreasing from 48 to 47 seats. The number of seats by States in the House of Representatives arising from the 2014 determination were as follows:

State or territory	Seats	Change
New South Wales	47	▼1
Victoria	37	Steady
Queensland	30	Steady
Western Australia	16	▲1
South Australia	11	Steady
Tasmania	5	Steady
Australian Capital Territory	2	Steady
Northern Territory	2	Steady
Total	150	Steady

A redistribution of electoral boundaries in New South Wales and Western Australia was undertaken before the 2016 election. The redistribution in New South Wales was announced on 16 October 2015, with the Labor-held Division of Hunter proposed to be abolished. The Division of Charlton was renamed Hunter to preserve the Hunter name used since federation. This effectively meant that the Division of Charlton was abolished and the Division of Hunter was retained. A redistribution also occurred in the Australian Capital Territory, as seven years had elapsed since the last time the ACT's boundaries were reviewed.

=== Historical entitlements ===
The historical apportionment entitlement of seats for the various states and territories is:

State or territory	1984	1986	1988	1991	1994	1997	1999	2003	2005	2009	2011	2014	2017	2020	2023	2026
New South Wales	51.382	51.339	51.043	50.417	50.314	50.075	50.014	49.918	49.317	48.218	47.854	47.386	47.320	47.114	46.430	46.015
Victoria	38.727	38.652	38.176	37.895	37.279	36.734	36.757	36.652	36.544	36.662	36.755	36.777	37.892	38.549	37.782	37.925
Queensland	23.767	23.881	24.403	25.149	26.176	27.138	27.398	27.961	28.767	29.616	29.932	29.747	29.636	29.733	30.309	30.418
Western Australia	13.108	13.200	13.706	14.136	14.061	14.254	14.517	14.505	14.608	14.971	15.247	16.209	15.582	15.296	15.921	16.383
South Australia	12.867	12.782	12.635	12.451	12.226	11.965	11.646	11.415	11.229	11.086	10.860	10.630	10.419	10.196	10.337	10.174
Tasmania	4.150	4.146	4.038	3.951	3.944	3.829	3.668	3.549	3.534	3.448	3.351	3.252	3.150	3.112	3.221	3.084
Australian Capital Territory	2	2	2	2.466	2.504	2.495	2.425	2.421	2.375	2.386	2.389	2.439	2.544	2.552	2.611	2.596
Northern Territory	1	1	1	1.377	1.428	1.454	1.524	1.498	1.505	1.536	1.526	1.557	1.502	1.433	1.423	1.424
Total	148	148	148	147	148	148	150	149	150	150	150	150	151	151	150	150

The entitlements of the external territories are less than 0.05 and are not shown in the table. Therefore, these territories are not entitled to any seats. The apportionment entitlements shown for Australian Capital Territory and Northern Territory have accounted for the populations of Norfolk Island, Christmas Island and Coco (Keeling) Islands.

=== Historical apportionments ===
The historical apportionment of seats for the various states and territories is:

State or territory	'01	'03	'06	'13	'22	'34	'37	'49	'55	'68	'69	'74	'77	'80	'84	'89	'92	'94	'97	'99	'00	'03	'06	'09	'11	'16	'18	'21	'24
New South Wales	26		27		28			47	46		45		43		51		50						49	48		47			46
Victoria	23		22	21	20			33			34		33		39	38		37									38	39	38
Queensland	9			10				18						19	24		25		26	27		28	29	30					
Western Australia	5							8	9			10	11		13	14					15				16			15	16
South Australia	1 (Note: Between 1901 and 1903, South Australia and Tasmania were each represented by a single multi-member seat, with South Australia represented by 7 members and Tasmania represented by 5 members. This resulted in 65 seats across the nation and 75 members in the House of Representatives during this period. In 1903, the two multi-member seats were split into individual single-member seats with no change to the number of members, resulting in a total of 75 single-member seats across the nation.)	7				6		10	11		12		11		13		12					11					10		
Tasmania	1	5																											
Australian Capital Territory	N/A									1		2						3	2								3		
Northern Territory	N/A									1											2								
Total	65	75				74		121	122	124	125	127	124	125	148		147	148			150						151		150

== Recent redistributions by state or territory (since 2016) ==
=== Australian Capital Territory ===
A redistribution of federal electoral divisions in the Australian Capital Territory commenced on 4 September 2017, due to changes in the territory's representation entitlement. The AEC released a proposed redistribution on 6 April 2018, and the final determination on 13 July 2018. The redistribution resulted in the creation of a third ACT electoral division named Bean (notionally fairly safe Labor), after historian Charles Bean.

The following scheduled redistribution began on 12 August 2025, roughly seven years after the previous redistribution. The redistribution was finalised and gazetted on 8 October 2026 with relatively minor changes to division boundaries.

The next scheduled redistribution will begin within 30 days from 8 October 2033, seven years after the latest redistribution, if the other redistribution requirements are not triggered until then.

=== New South Wales ===
New South Wales underwent a redistribution on 25 February 2016, before the May 2016 federal election.

Due to another change in the state's representation entitlement, New South Wales underwent a redistribution in 2024 which would abolish a seat and reducing the entitlement to 46. If there had been no change in entitlement, the state would still have undergone a scheduled redistribution anyway (seven years since the previous redistribution). In the draft redistribution announced on 14 June 2024, the seat of North Sydney was proposed to be abolished. The redistribution was formalised and gazetted on 10 October 2024.

The next scheduled redistribution will begin within 30 days from 10 October 2031, seven years after the latest redistribution, if the other redistribution requirements are not triggered until then.

=== Northern Territory ===
On 7 December 2016, the Electoral Commission for the Northern Territory announced the results of its deliberations into the boundaries of Lingiari and Solomon, the two federal electoral divisions in the Northern Territory. New boundaries gazetted from 7 February 2017 saw the remainder of the Litchfield Municipality and parts of Palmerston (the suburbs of Farrar, Johnston, Mitchell, Zuccoli and part of Yarrawonga) transferred from Solomon to Lingiari.

The following scheduled redistribution began on 22 February 2024. The number of seats for the Northern Territory (two seats) remained unchanged. The redistribution was formalised and gazetted on 4 March 2025. The outer suburbs of Palmerston that had been transferred from Solomon to Lingiari in 2017 were transferred back to Solomon. This also meant that the entirety of City of Palmerston was within Solomon.

The next scheduled redistribution will begin within 30 days from 4 March 2032, seven years after the latest redistribution, if the other redistribution requirements are not triggered until then.

=== Queensland ===
A scheduled redistribution began in Queensland on 6 January 2017, and was finalised on 27 March 2018. Changes were made to the boundaries of 18 of Queensland's 30 electoral divisions, and no division names were changed.

The following scheduled redistribution was supposed to begin within 30 days from 27 March 2025, seven years after the previous redistribution. However, under Section 59(3) of the Commonwealth Electoral Act 1918, as the date fell within the last 12 months of the 47th Parliament (due to expire 25 July 2025), the redistribution was deferred to after the 2025 election. It would have commenced within 30 days after the start of the 48th Parliament (22 July 2025) in accordance with Commonwealth Electoral Act 1918. In August 2025, Electoral Commission deemed that the seat entitlement for Queensland might change. In accordance with Section 59(5) of the act, the redistribution would be further deferred to July-August 2026 when the final seat entitlement could be confirmed. The redistribution finally began on 28 July 2026 following confirmation that the seat entitlement would not change. The redistribution is expected to be completed by late 2027.

=== South Australia ===
The redistribution in South Australia commenced on 4 September 2017. The proposed redistribution report was released on 13 April 2018, and the final determination on 20 July 2018. The AEC abolished the division of Port Adelaide. The hybrid urban-rural seat of Wakefield became the entirely urban seat of Spence, after Catherine Helen Spence. The more rural portions of Wakefield transferred to Grey and Barker.

Port Adelaide was abolished due to population changes since the state's last redistribution in 2011. Although South Australia's population was still increasing, faster increases in other states saw a reduction in South Australia's representation from 11 to 10 seats. This was the third time South Australia lost a seat since the 1984 enlargement of the parliament, with Hawker abolished in 1993 and Bonython in 2004.

The following scheduled redistribution began on 12 August 2025, roughly seven years after the previous redistribution. The redistribution was finalised and gazetted on 8 October 2026, with the main change being the renaming of Grey to O'Donoghue.

The next scheduled redistribution will begin within 30 days from 8 October 2033, seven years after the latest redistribution, if the other redistribution requirements are not triggered until then.

=== Tasmania ===
A scheduled redistribution began in Tasmania on 1 September 2016. The determinations were announced on 27 September 2017, involved boundary changes, and Denison was renamed Clark. Final determination was on 14 November 2017.

The next scheduled redistribution was supposed to begin within 30 days from 14 November 2024, seven years after the previous redistribution. However, under Section 59 of the Commonwealth Electoral Act 1918, as the date fell within the last 12 months of the 47th Parliament (due to expire 25 July 2025), the redistribution was deferred to after the 2025 election. It would commence within 30 days after the start of the 48th Parliament (22 July 2025), in accordance with Commonwealth Electoral Act 1918.

The redistribution eventually began on 12 August 2025. It was finalised and gazetted on 8 October 2026, with significant changes to seat boundaries. The main changes were:

- Most of the east coast of Tasmania was transferred from Lyons to Franklin, and the remaining east coast (specifically the Break O'Day local government area) was transferred to Division of Bass. This meant that Lyons would become landlocked and no longer bordered any coastline.
- All areas of Franklin west of the River Derwent (Huon Valley and part of the Kingsborough local government areas) were transferred to Clark.
- Franklin was previously non-contiguous (geographically separated) over River Derwent since the 1992 redistribution, and was the only non-contiguous federal division in Australia (except those incorporating islands or external territories). The gain of the east coast and the loss of areas west of the River Derwent in the 2026 redistribution allowed the issue of non-contiguity to be resolved.
- The City of Glenorchy was transferred from Clark to Lyons

In the announcement of the final boundaries in July 2026, the Commission additionally proposed to rename Franklin to Tongerlongeter, named after Aboriginal Tasmanian Tongerlongeter. The name change proposal was not part of the draft redistribution, which had already undergone consultations, and had only emerged towards the end of the consultation process. Noting that the name change proposal would require further consultation and consideration, the name change proposal was dropped the following month.

The next scheduled redistribution will begin within 30 days from 8 October 2033, seven years after the latest redistribution, if the other redistribution requirements are not triggered until then.

=== Western Australia ===
A redistribution of federal election divisions in Western Australia was undertaken in 2020, due to changes in the state's representation entitlement. The determinations were made on 2 August 2021, and abolished the Division of Stirling.

Due to changes in the state's representation entitlement, Western Australia gained a seat in the 2024 redistribution. In the draft redistribution announced on 31 May 2024, the new seat was proposed to be named Bullwinkel. The redistribution was formalised and gazetted on 24 September 2024.

The next scheduled redistribution will begin within 30 days from 24 September 2031, seven years after the latest redistribution, if the other redistribution requirements are not triggered until then.

=== Victoria ===
A redistribution of federal electoral divisions in Victoria commenced on 4 September 2017, due to changes in the state's representation entitlement. The determinations were made on 13 July 2018, and created a 38th electoral division named Fraser (notionally a safe Labor).

Several divisions were also renamed: Batman to Cooper (after William Cooper), McMillan to Monash (after Sir John Monash), Melbourne Ports to Macnamara (after Dame Jean Macnamara) and Murray to Nicholls (after Sir Douglas and Lady Nicholls). A proposal to rename Corangamite to Cox (after swimming instructor May Cox) did not proceed. The Coalition notionally lost the seat of Dunkley and Corangamite to Labor in the redistribution.

Another redistribution in Victoria was finalised and gazetted on 26 July 2021, creating a 39th electoral division named Division of Hawke (notionally a safe Labor). None of the existing 38 divisions were notionally lost in the redistribution.

Due to another change in the state's representation entitlement, Victoria underwent a third consecutive redistribution in 2024 which would abolish a seat and returning the entitlement to 38 seats. In the draft redistribution announced on 31 May 2024, the seat of Higgins was proposed to be abolished. The redistribution was formalised and gazetted on 17 October 2024.

The next scheduled redistribution will begin within 30 days from 17 October 2031, seven years after the latest redistribution, if the other redistribution requirements are not triggered until then.

== Redistribution process ==
A redistribution is undertaken on a State-by-State basis. After the redistribution process commences, a Redistribution Committee — consisting of the Electoral Commissioner, the Australian Electoral Officer for the State concerned (in the ACT, the senior Divisional Returning officer), the State Surveyor General and the State Auditor General — is formed. The Electoral Commissioner invites public suggestions on the redistribution which must be lodged within 30 days. A further period of 14 days is allowed for comments on the suggestions lodged. The Redistribution Committee then divides the State or Territory into divisions and publishes its proposed redistribution. A period of 28 days is allowed after publication of the proposed redistribution for written objections. A further period of 14 days is provided for comments on the objections lodged. These objections are considered by an augmented Electoral Commission — consisting of the four members of the Redistribution Committee and the two part-time members of the Electoral Commission.

At the time of the redistribution the number of electors in the divisions may vary up to 10% from the 'quota' or average divisional figure but at a point 3.5 years after the expected completion of the redistribution, the figures should not vary from the average projected quota by more or less than 3.5%. Thus the most rapidly growing divisions are generally started with enrolments below the quota while those that are losing population are started above the quota.

Neither the Government nor the Parliament can reject or amend the final determination of the augmented Electoral Commission.

== Management ==
Boundaries for the Australian House of Representatives and for the six state and two territorial legislatures are drawn up by independent authorities, at the federal level by the Australian Electoral Commission (AEC) and in the states and territories by their equivalent bodies. Politicians have no influence over the process, although they, along with any other citizen or organisation, can make submissions to the independent authorities suggesting changes.

There is significantly less political interference in the redistribution process than is common in the United States. In 1978, federal Cabinet minister Reg Withers was forced to resign for suggesting to another minister that the name of a federal electorate be changed to suit a political ally.

There have been examples of malapportionment of federal and state electoral districts in the past, often resulting in rural constituencies containing far fewer voters than urban ones and maintaining in power those parties that have rural support despite polling fewer popular votes. Past malapportionments in Queensland, Western Australia and the 'Playmander' in South Australia were notorious examples of the differences between urban and rural constituency sizes than their population would merit. The Playmander distorted electoral boundaries and policies that kept the Liberal and Country League in power for 32 years from 1936 to 1968. In extreme cases, rural areas had four times the voting value of metropolitan areas. Supporters of such arrangements claimed Australia's urban population dominates the countryside and that these practices gave fair representation to country people.

== Naming of divisions ==
The redistribution, creation and abolition of divisions is the responsibility of the AEC. When new divisions are created, the AEC will select a name. Most divisions are named in honour of prominent historical people, such as former politicians (often Prime Ministers), explorers, artists and engineers, and rarely for geographic places.

Some of the criteria the AEC uses when naming new divisions are:

- divisions are named after deceased Australians who have rendered outstanding service to their country, with consideration given to former Prime Ministers
- the original names of Divisions proclaimed at Federation in 1901 are to be retained where possible
- geographical place names are to be avoided
- Aboriginal names can be used as appropriate
- names that duplicate names of state electoral districts are not to be used.

Divisions with Indigenous names and the remaining 34 of the 65 original divisions (i.e those that were contested at the 1901 federal election, note that 32 of the 65 have since been abolished) should not be renamed or abolished.

=== Geographical locations ===
There are several divisions named after geographical locations, including bodies of water, islands, settlements. For example, the seat of Werriwa in Western Sydney is named after Lake George (no longer located in the seat of Werriwa since the 1906 redistribution), which is known as Weereewa in the Ngunnawal language.

=== Individuals ===
Several deceased individuals have been honoured with divisions named after them, including several Indigenous Australians.

Every deceased former Prime Minister had a division named after them. The Division of Cook in Sydney was originally only named after Captain James Cook, and not former Prime Minister Sir Joseph Cook. However, in 2024, the namesake was altered to be joint between both men, to give recognition to Joseph Cook and have a division named after him.

There are seven former Prime Ministers who are still alive (Paul Keating, John Howard, Kevin Rudd, Julia Gillard, Tony Abbott, Malcolm Turnbull and Scott Morrison), who therefore do not have divisions named after them as they are still alive. However, divisions named after Prime Ministers are not necessarily divisions that have been renamed, generally a new division is created instead, sometimes even in a different city or region (e.g Malcolm Fraser served as the member for Wannon in western Victoria, but the Division of Fraser in western Melbourne). While it is unlikely for any former Prime Minister to have their exact division they served whilst in office renamed in honour of them (as opposed to creating a new division), for some divisions it is impossible due to the practice of keeping the names of the original divisions and those of divisions with Indigenous names. For example, the Bennelong (the seat John Howard held as Prime Minister) and Warringah (the seat Tony Abbott held as Prime Minister) will not be renamed "Howard" and "Abbott", respectively due to these names being Indigenous, while Wentworth (the seat Malcolm Turnbull held as Prime Minister) will not be renamed "Turnbull" due to Wentworth being one of the 65 original divisions created.

=== State electoral districts ===
The AEC guidelines explicitly prohibit the use of names that are also used for state electoral districts. However, due to the fact that the names of the original divisions should remain the same, there are still some divisions that share the names of state electoral districts because they are among the original divisions, as well as some that were created after 1901 but before this guideline was implemented. Thus, the following divisions share the same name as a state electoral district (Tasmanian electorates share the same names and boundaries on both levels of politics, and are thus not included as pairs of examples):

Federal division		State district		Original division?
Name	State	Name	State	Original division?
Adelaide	SA	Adelaide	SA	No
Bass	TAS	Bass	VIC	No
Cook	NSW	Cook	QLD	No
Cooper	VIC	Cooper	QLD	No
Flinders	VIC	Flinders	SA	Yes
Fremantle	WA	Fremantle	WA	Yes
Melbourne	VIC	Melbourne	VIC	Yes
Newcastle	NSW	Newcastle	NSW	Yes
Parramatta	NSW	Parramatta	NSW	Yes
Perth	WA	Perth	WA	Yes
Richmond	NSW	Richmond	VIC	Yes
Sydney	NSW	Sydney	NSW	No

== Notional seat status ==
After a redistribution is carried out in a state or territory, the AEC calculates "notional" margins for the redistributed divisions by modelling the outcome of the previous election as if the new boundaries had been in place. These notional margins are used as the baseline for the electoral swings calculated and published in the AEC's virtual tally room at the following election. In some cases, the change in electoral boundaries can see the party which notionally holds the seat differ from the party which won it at the election.
