= Salka, Niger State =

Salka
- Town
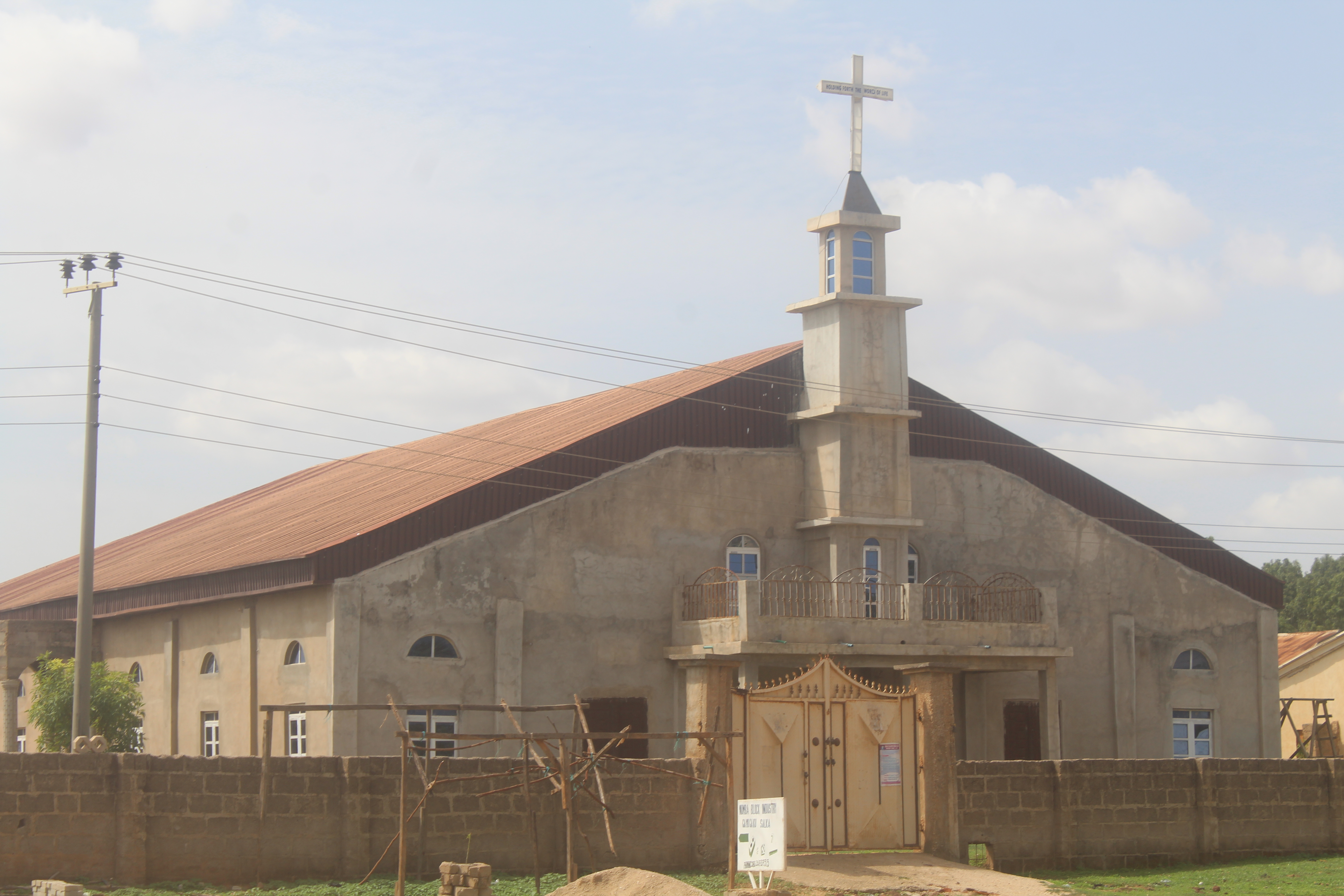

- Location within Nigeria
- Coordinates: 10°18′48″N 04°58′22″E
- Country: Nigeria
- State: Niger State
- LGA: Magama
- Elevation: 302 m (991 ft)

Population (JRC)
  - Total: 46,143
- Time zone: UTC+01:00 (WAT)
- Climate: Aw

Salka is a town in Magama Local Government Area, Niger State, Middle Belt, Nigeria. The postal code of the area is 923.

== Demographics ==
=== People ===
The Ashingini (Kambari) people are the indigenous people of the town of Salka.

=== Language ===
The Tsishingini language, belonging to the Shingini or Kambari languages is most widely spoken.

=== Population ===
The area has a population of 46,143 people.

== Geography ==
The area has an altitude of about 302 metres

== See also ==
- List of villages in Niger State
