= 2021 Nigerian state legislative elections =

2022 elections in Nigeria to fill state legislative vacancies

- Various dates

4 of the 991 seats
	Majority party	Minority party
Party	Peoples Democratic Party	All Progressives Congress
Seats up	2	2
Seats won	3	1
Seat change	▲1	▼1

The 2021 Nigerian state legislative elections were called to fill vacant seats in state Houses of Assembly.

== Background ==
The 991 members of the 36 state Houses of Assembly are elected from single-seat constituencies using first-past-the-post voting; when vacancies occur, by-elections (or bye-elections) are called, scheduled, and administered by the Independent National Electoral Commission.

== Elections ==
=== Delta State ===
==== Isoko North State Constituency by-election ====
Candidates' vote share
1. Jude Ogbimi (PDP) (91.5%)
2. Emmanuel Tabuko (APC) (7.91%)
3. Other candidates (0.61%)

On April 6, 2021, the member for Isoko North, Tim Owhefere (PDP) died from an undisclosed illness. In March, INEC set the date for the by-election for April 10 with party primaries taking place between March 11 and March 20. Jude Ogbimi, the PDP nominee, defeated runner-up Emmanuel Tabuko (APC) by over 83% and nearly 27,000 votes. The election had 25.51% turnout and was conducted peacefully according to participating candidates.

2021 Isoko North State Constituency by-election
Party	Candidate	Votes	%
PDP	Jude Ogbimi	29,421	91.48
APC	Emmanuel Tabuko	2,543	7.91
Other candidates		196	0.61
Total votes		32,160	100.00
Turnout		32,658	25.51
PDP hold			

==== Isoko South I State Constituency by-election ====
Candidates' vote share
1. Ovuakpoye Evivie (PDP) (72.2%)
2. Ogaga Ifowodo (APC) (13.5%)
3. Michael Emumena Paul (SDP) (13.4%)
4. Other candidates (0.90%)

On June 27, 2021, the member for Isoko South I, Kenneth Ogba (PDP) died from an unspecified heart-related disease. In August, INEC set the date for the by-election for September 11 with party primaries taking place between August 4 and August 31. Ovuakpoye Evivie, the PDP nominee, defeated runners-up Ogaga Ifowodo (APC) and Michael Emumena Paul (SDP) by nearly 60% and over 5,500 votes. The election had 16.94% turnout and was successfully used as a test run for INEC's new Bimodal Voter Accreditation System (BVAS) device with candidates and observers praising INEC's conduct. However, the election's successful conduct was overshadowed by the murder of a local vigilante by gunmen at Polling Unit 5 of Irri Ward 10 and the nonfatal shooting of another person in Oleh. After the election, INEC disclosed that five BVAS devices had been stolen during the election and implored Evivie to help find and return them.

2021 Isoko South I State Constituency by-election
Party	Candidate	Votes	%
PDP	Ovuakpoye Evivie	6,957	72.20
APC	Ogaga Ifowodo	1,301	13.50
SDP	Michael Emumena Paul	1,291	13.40
Other candidates		87	0.90
Total votes		9,636	100.00
Turnout		9,807	16.94
PDP hold			

=== Ekiti State ===
==== Ekiti East I State Constituency by-election (postponed) ====
On January 31, 2021, member for Ekiti East I Juwa Adegbuyi (APC) died from an undisclosed illness. In February, INEC set the date for the by-election for March 20 with party primaries taking place between February 26 and March 3. However, on the by-election date, multiple reports of violence and ballot snatching including the murder of 3 people at a polling station in Omuo where Senator Abiodun Olujimi was observing voting led INEC to suspend the by-election indefinitely.

2021 Ekiti East I State Constituency by-election
Party	Candidate	Votes	%
AA	Olayinka Christiana Oluwayemisi		
APC	Fatoba Oluwole Abraham		
APGA	Ilesanmi Magret		
PDP	Akintunde Adeyemi Adeniran		
YPP	Idowu Ebenezer Alao		
Total votes			100.0%
Turnout			

=== Jigawa State ===
==== Kafin Hausa State Constituency by-election ====
Candidates' vote share
1. Muhammad Adamu (APC) (62.8%)
2. Garba Tambale (PDP) (36.2%)
3. Other candidates (1.01%)

On January 18, 2021, member for Kafin Hausa, Adamu Babban Bare (APC), died from an undisclosed illness suspected to be cancer. Later in January, INEC set the date for the by-election for March 6 with party primaries taking place between February 2 and February 8. APC nominee and son of Adamu Babban Bare, Muhammad Adamu, defeated the PDP's Garba Tambale by 26% and over 6,300 votes. The election had 39.86% turnout and was conducted smoothly according to lawmakers and INEC officials.

2021 Kafin Hausa State Constituency by-election
Party	Candidate	Votes	%
APC	Muhammad Adamu	14,924	62.77
PDP	Garba Tambale	8,612	36.22
APM	Usman Isyako	72	0.30
ADP	Ibrahim Abdulkarim	69	0.29
ADC	Garba Musa	56	0.24
AAC	Sani Haruna	43	0.18
Total votes		23,776	100.00
Turnout		24,392	39.86
APC hold			

=== Kaduna State ===
==== Sabon Gari State Constituency by-election ====
Candidates' vote share
1. Usman Baba (PDP) (53.8%)
2. Musa Musa (APC) (43.7%)
3. Other candidates (2.53%)

On April 29, 2021, the seat of Sabon Gari was declared vacant after member Aminu Abdullahi Shagali (APC) did not attend legislative meetings for a prolonged period of time and did not submit a requested letter of apology to the House of Assembly. In May, INEC set the date for the by-election for June 19 with party primaries taking place between May 18 and May 24. The PDP nominee, Usman Baba, flipped the seat by defeating the APC's Musa Musa by 10% and over 1700 votes. The election was conducted peacefully according to journalists but was marred by low turnout, at 13.43%.

2021 Sabon Gari State Constituency by-election
Party	Candidate	Votes	%
PDP	Usman Baba	9,113	53.78
APC	Musa Musa	7,404	43.69
PRP	Musa Halilu	305	1.80
ADC	Anas Abdullahi	62	0.37
ADP	Chindo Ibrahim	61	0.36
Total votes		16,945	100.00
Turnout		17,131	13.43
PDP gain from APC			

== See also ==
- 2021 Nigerian House of Representatives elections
