= Jafaru Iliyasu Auna =

Nigerian politician

Federal Representative
- Constituency: Rijau/Magama

Personal details
- Died: December 2, 2019
- Party: All Progressive Congress (APC)
- Occupation: Politician

Jafaru Iliyasu Auna was a Nigerian politician who represented Rijau/Magama Federal Constituency of Niger State in the 9th National Assembly under the platform of the All Progressive Congress (APC). He died on December 2, 2019 at Maitama General Hospital after a brief illness. He was succeeded by Shehu Saleh Rijau after a rerun election.
