= 2021 Nigerian House of Representatives elections =

2021 House elections in Nigeria to fill legislative vacancies

- Various dates

4 of the 360 seats in the House of Representatives
	Majority party	Minority party	Third party
Party	All Progressives Congress	Peoples Democratic Party	All Progressives Grand Alliance
Last election	203	125	9
Seats up	3	0	1
Seats won	2	1	1
Seat change	▼1	▲1	Steady

The 2021 Nigerian House of Representatives elections are called to fill vacant seats in the House of Representatives.

== Background ==
The 360 members of the House of Representatives are elected from single-seat constituencies using first-past-the-post voting; when vacancies occur, by-elections (or bye-elections) are called, scheduled, and administered by the Independent National Electoral Commission. New elections are also called if the general election was annulled by a court or election tribunal with these elections being referred to as supplementary elections if the election is only held in certain polling units and as rerun elections if the election held throughout the entire constituency.

== Elections ==
=== Summary ===
Constituency	Incumbent		Election	
Constituency	Member	Party	Results	Candidates
Magama/Rijau (re-run)	Ja’afaru Iliyasu	APC	Incumbent died December 2, 2019; March 2020 by-election annulled New member elected on February 6, 2021; APGA gain	✓ Shehu Saleh Rijau (APGA) 50.1%; Emmanuel Alamu (PDP) 49.1%
Aba North/Aba South	Ossy Prestige	APGA	Incumbent died February 9, 2021; New member elected on March 27, 2021; PDP gain	✓ Chimaobi Ebisike (PDP) 65.5%; Mascot Uzor Kalu (APC) 23.3%; Destiny Nwagwu (APGA) 9.9%
Gwaram	Yuguda Hassan-Kila	APC	Incumbent died March 4, 2021; New member elected on June 19, 2021; APC hold	✓ Yusuf Galami (APC) 72.4%; Kamilu Inuwa (PDP) 24.8%
Lere	Suleiman Aliyu	APC	Incumbent died April 6, 2021; New member elected on August 14, 2021; APC hold	✓ Ahmed Munir (APC) 66.5%; Ibrahim Usman (PDP) 30.9%

=== Magama/Rijau Federal Constituency by-election rerun ===
Candidates' vote share
1. Shehu Saleh Rijau (APGA) (50.1%)
2. Emmanuel Alamu (PDP) (49.1%)
3. Halilu Yussuf (ADC) (0.74%)

On December 2, 2019, Magama/Rijau Representative Ja’afaru Iliyasu (APC) died from an unknown illness. In March 2020, Kasimu Danjuma of the APC won the ensuing by-election over the PDP's Emmanuel Alamu and the APGA's Shehu Saleh Rijau, 47%-34%-18%; however, on September 21, the Election Petitions Tribunal disqualified Danjuma for forged documentation and annulled the election. In November 2020, the decision was upheld by a Court of Appeal which ordered INEC to hold a rerun election. Later that month, the commission announced that the APC would not be allowed to nominate a new nominee as only eligible nominees from the annulled election would be allowed to run, it also set the date for the by-election for February 6. Shehu Saleh Rijau, the APGA nominee, defeated the PDP's Emmanuel Alamu by 1% and less than 500 votes. The election had 29.33% turnout, slightly less than the annulled election's 31.94% turnout, and was conducted successfully according to INEC officials.

2021 Magama/Rijau Federal Constituency re-run by-election
Party	Candidate	Votes	%
APGA	Shehu Saleh Rijau	22,965	50.13
PDP	Emmanuel Alamu	22,507	49.13
ADC	Halilu Yussuf	336	0.74
Total votes		45,808	100.00
Turnout		46,499	29.33
APGA gain from APC			

=== Aba North/Aba South Federal Constituency by-election ===
Candidates' vote share
1. Chimaobi Ebisike (PDP) (65.5%)
2. Mascot Uzor Kalu (APC) (23.3%)
3. Destiny Nwagwu (APGA) (9.85%)
4. Other candidates (1.40%)

On February 9, 2021, Aba North/Aba South Representative Ossy Prestige (APGA) died from an undisclosed illness. Later in February, INEC set the date for the by-election for March 27 with party primaries taking place between March 4 and March 10. Chimaobi Ebisike, the PDP nominee, defeated the APC's Mascot Uzor Kalu by 42% and over 6,600 votes. The election was marred by both extremely low turnout, at 3.29%, and violence with a bombing at the Umuola Hall polling station and the kidnapping of an APC collation officer.

2021 Aba North/Aba South Federal Constituency by-election
Party	Candidate	Votes	%
PDP	Chimaobi Ebisike	10,322	65.45
APC	Mascot Uzor Kalu	3,674	23.29
APGA	Destiny Nwagwu	1,554	9.85
AA	Okey Prestige	199	1.26
NRM	Uwandu Emmanuel Chima	13	0.08
APM	Abraham Junior Okogbua	10	0.06
Total votes		15,772	100.00
Turnout		16,017	3.29
PDP gain from APGA			

=== Gwaram Federal Constituency by-election ===
Candidates' vote share
1. Yusuf Galami (APC) (72.4%)
2. Kamilu Inuwa (PDP) (24.8%)
3. Other candidates (2.89%)

On March 4, 2021, Gwaram Representative Yuguda Hassan-Kila (APC) died from an undisclosed illness. In May, INEC set the date for the by-election for June 19 with party primaries taking place between May 18 and May 24. Yusuf Galami, the APC nominee, defeated the PDP's Kamilu Inuwa by over 47% and nearly 20,000 votes. The election had 31.59% turnout and was conducted peacefully according to participating voters and INEC officials.

2021 Gwaram Federal Constituency by-election
Party	Candidate	Votes	%
APC	Yusuf Galami	29,372	72.36
PDP	Kamilu Inuwa	10,047	24.75
Other candidates		1,175	2.89
Total votes		40,594	100.00
Turnout		41,869	31.59
APC hold			

=== Lere Federal Constituency by-election ===
Candidates' vote share
1. Ahmed Munir (APC) (67.4%)
2. Ibrahim Usman (PDP) (31.4%)
3. Other candidates (1.24%)

On April 6, 2021, Lere Representative Suleiman Aliyu (APC) died from an undisclosed illness. In July, INEC set the date for the by-election for August 14 with party primaries taking place between July 13 and July 24. Ahmed Munir, the APC nominee, defeated the PDP's Ibrahim Usman by 35% and over 18,000 votes. The election had 22.85% turnout and was conducted peacefully according to journalists.

2021 Lere Federal Constituency by-election
Party	Candidate	Votes	%
APC	Ahmed Munir	34,958	67.39
PDP	Ibrahim Usman	16,271	31.37
YPP	Malami Salihi Abdulkarim	294	0.57
PRP	Suleiman Lere	226	0.44
APGA	Blank due to Court Order	125	0.24
Total votes		51,874	100.0%
Turnout		52,874	22.85

== See also ==
- 2021 Nigerian state legislative elections
