= Ifana =

- Village
- Location within Nigeria
- Coordinates: 10°41′00″N 04°53′00″E
- Country: Nigeria
- State: Niger State
- LGA: Magama
- Time zone: UTC+01:00 (WAT)
- Climate: Aw

Ifana is a village in Magama Local Government Area in Niger State in the Middle Belt region of Nigeria. The village is about 218.1 km (135.5 mi) from the state capital, Minna, and about 339.0 km (210.6 mi) from the Nigerian capital, Abuja. The postal code of the area is 923.

== See also ==
- List of villages in Niger State
