= 2021 Rajasthan municipal elections =

Details of the 2020 Rajasthan urban local body elections

2021 Rajasthan urban local body elections
- 2021

3,034 wards across 90 urban local bodies (ULBs)
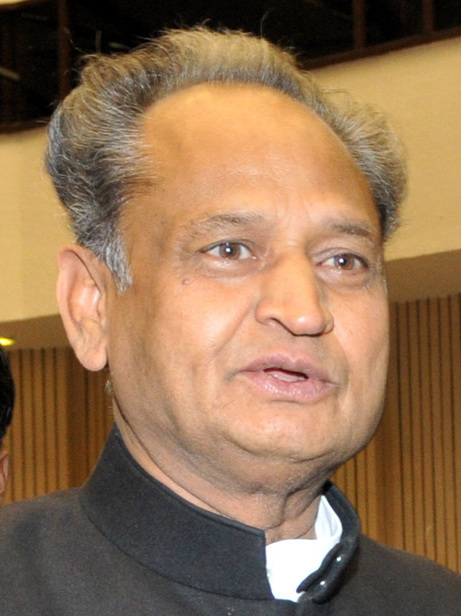

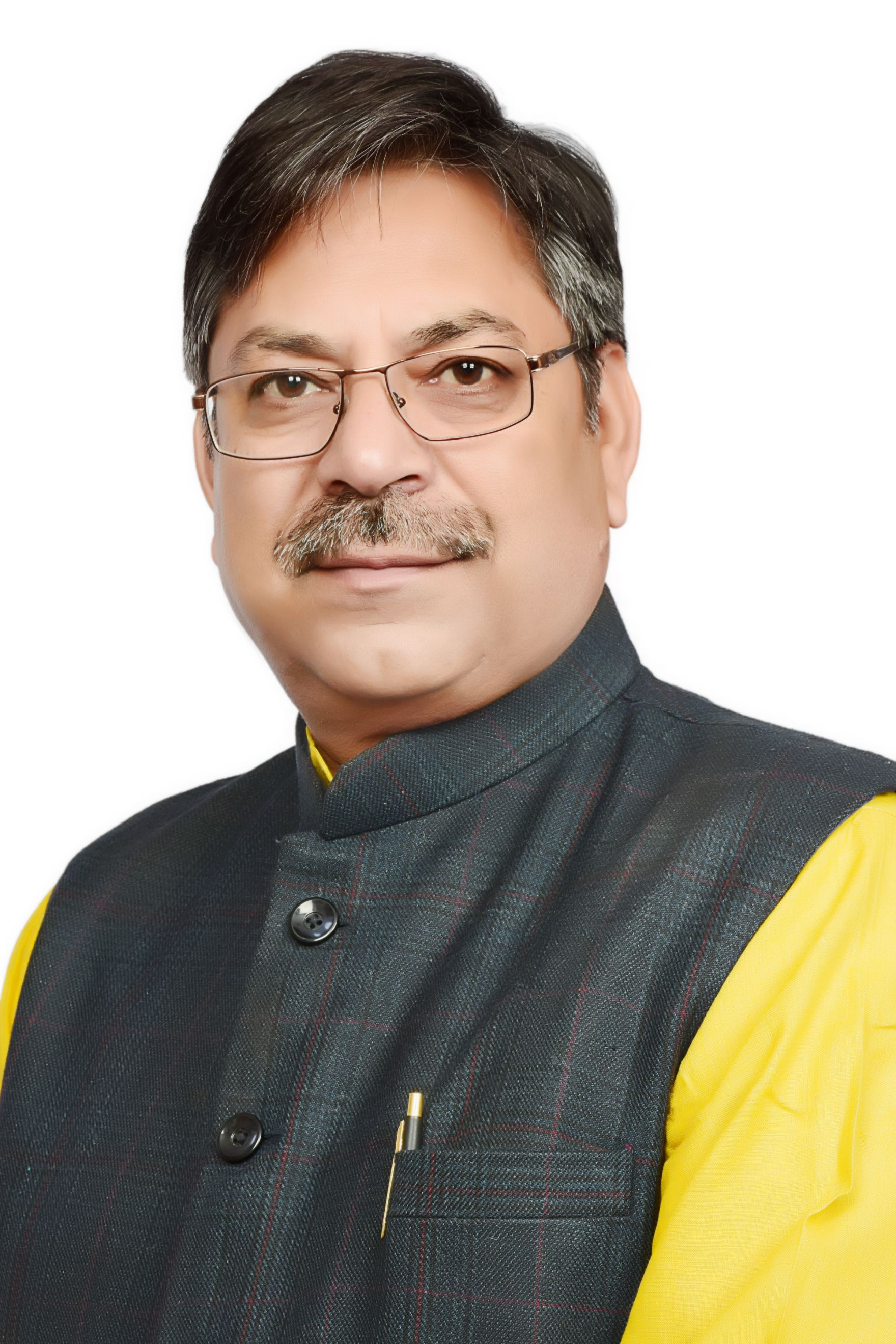

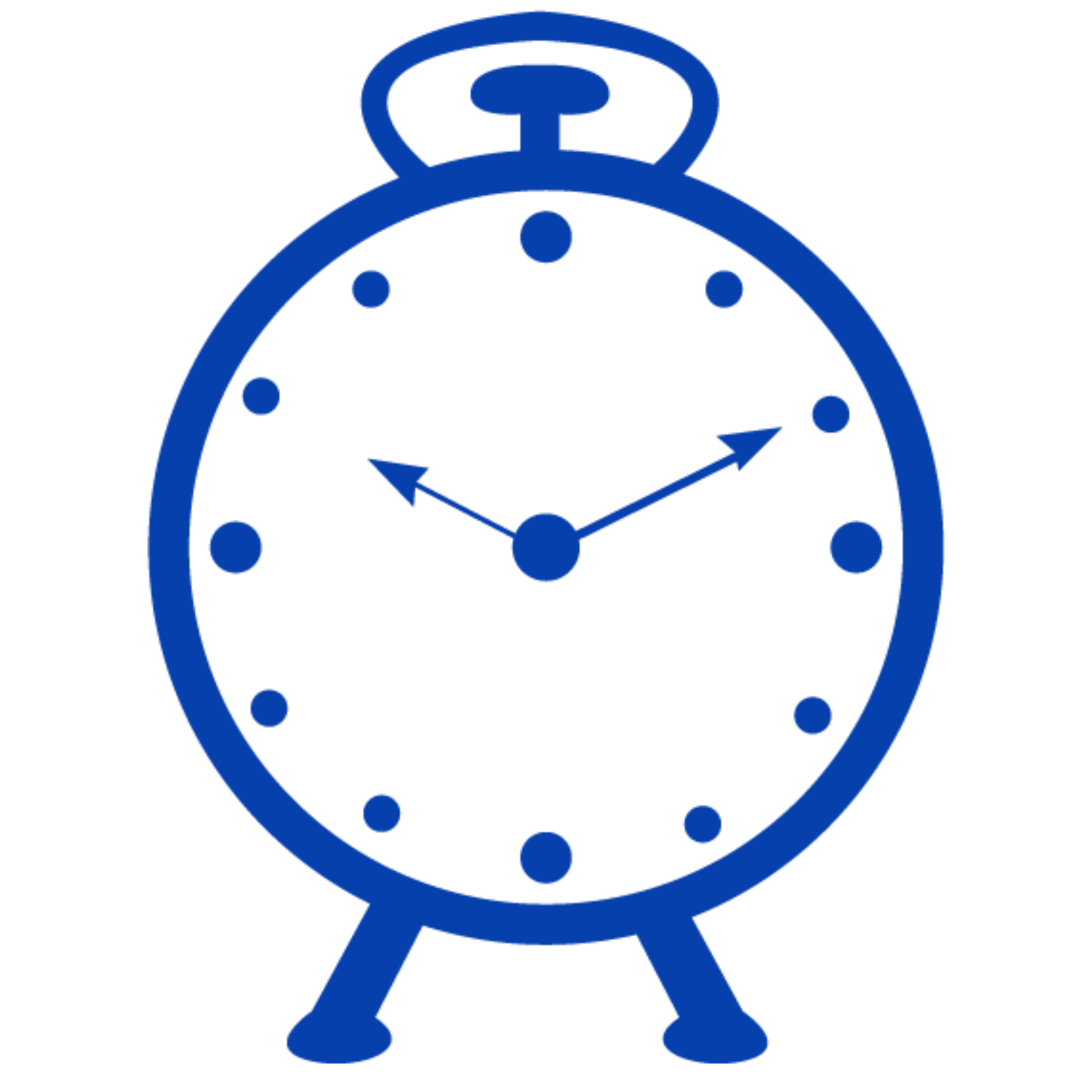
| | First party | Second party | Third party |
|---|---|---|---|
| Leader | Ashok Gehlot | Satish Poonia | Ummed Singh Champawat |
| Party | INC | BJP | NCP |
| Wards | 1,197 | 1,140 | 46 |
| Wards ± | TBC | TBC | TBC |
| ULBs | 23 (Note: Includes both majority and leads) | 24 (Note: Includes both majority and leads) | 2 |
| ULBs ± | TBC | TBC | TBC |
| Mayors | 48 | 37 | 1 |
| Mayors ± | TBC | TBC | TBC |

Local elections were held in the Indian state of Rajasthan for 90 urban local bodies in the state on 28 January 2021. The Indian National Congress registered a victory in a neck-to-neck fight with the Bharatiya Janata Party.

== Results ==
| Sl. | Party | Symbol | Wards | ULBs | Mayors |
|---|---|---|---|---|---|
| 1. | Indian National Congress | | 1,197 | 23 | 48 |
| 2. | Bharatiya Janata Party | | 1,140 | 24 | 37 |
| 3. | Nationalist Congress Party | | 46 | 2 | 1 |
| 4. | Rashtriya Loktantrik Party | | 13 | TBC | 1 |
| 5. | Communist Party of India (Marxist) | | 3 | TBC | 0 |
| 6. | Bahujan Samaj Party | | 1 | TBC | 0 |
| 7. | Independents | | 634 | TBC | 3 |
| Total | | | 3,034 | 90 | |
