= 2021 Paraguayan municipal elections =

- October 10, 2021
- 261 Mayors; 2.781 District Councils
- Turnout: 2,717,808 (60.55%) ▲4 pp
Party	Leader	Vote %	Seats	+/–
ANR	Mario Abdo Benítez	59.76	163	+15
PLRA	Efraín Alegre	28.21	63	−12
Local alliances	–	9.49	29	+12
UNACE	Jorge Oviedo Matto	0.59	2	−1
PNG-30A	Miguel González Duarte	0.62	1	0
PEN	Fernando Camacho Paredes	0.56	1	New
PPQ	Sebastián Villarejo	0.49	1	New
PRF	Josefina Duarte	0.28	1	0
This lists parties that won seats. See the complete results below.

Municipal elections were held in Paraguay on Sunday, October 10, 2021, to elect Mayors and Councilors of municipal boards of the 261 districts of the country, for the period 2021–2025.

These elections were originally scheduled to take place in 2020, but due to the COVID-19 pandemic they were postponed until 2021.

== General data ==
The website of the Tribunal Superior de Justicia Electoral (TSJE), the local elections regulatory agency, reflects the following electoral demographic data:

Electoral demographic data
Estimated population (2021, INE)	7,353,038
Qualified voters	4,644,536
Participation	TBD
Valid votes	TBD
None of the above	TBD
Spoilt votes	TBD
Municipalities	261

A total of 261 municipalities will elect their respective Mayors and 2,781 Councilors of the Municipal Board.

Competing charges
Department	Mayors	Councilors
Asunción	1	24
Concepción	13	129
San Pedro	22	213
Cordillera	20	204
Guairá	18	168
Caaguazú	22	222
Caazapá	11	111
Itapúa	30	348
Misiones	10	111
Paraguarí	18	180
Alto Paraná	22	252
Central	19	228
Ñeembucú	16	159
Amambay	6	63
Canindeyú	16	159
Presidente Hayes	9	105
Alto Paraguay	4	45
Boquerón	4	45
Total	261	2,781

Per La Nacion, 10/11/21: ANR controlled 162, the PLRA controlled 62, and Others controlled 37. The ANR retained Asuncion. The ANR retook Concepcion. And the Alliance took Ciudad del Este.
