= 2021 Kano State local elections =

2021 local elections in Kano State, Nigeria

2021 Kano local elections
- January 16, 2021

44 chairmen and 484 councillors
	First party
Party	APC
Chairmen	44
Chairmen (+/–)	Steady
Councillors	484
Councillors (+/–)	Steady

The 2021 Kano local elections were held on January 16, 2021, to elect 44 local government chairmen and 484 local government councillors in all 44 local government areas. As in the 2018 elections, the Kano All Progressives Congress won all 44 chairmanship and 484 councillorship seats.

The All Progressives Congress' primaries reportedly became selections based on loyalty to incumbent Governor Abdullahi Umar Ganduje without policy debates as Ganduje attempts to build support for his post-governorship. For the main opposition, the Peoples Democratic Party, its Kwankwasiyya faction boycotted the elections while the other faction led by Aminu Bashir Wali participated in the elections; the Kano State Independent Electoral Commission recognized the Wali-led faction, leading to lawsuits from the Kwankwasiyya faction. In total, 12 parties participated in the elections, although only the APC contested all 528 elections.

On election day, voting was peaceful but concerns over low turnout and underage voting were raised immediately. Chairman of the Kano State Independent Electoral Commission Ibrahim Garba-Sheka claimed the elections were successful and did not respond to The Punch reporter queries on photos of underage voters next to KANIEC officials. After the election, further reports of rigging in the APC primaries and underage voting along with a report of Garba-Sheka dining with Ganduje on election day led to doubts in the validity of the results and calls for reform in local election administration.

== See also ==
- 2019 Kano State gubernatorial election
- 2023 Kano State gubernatorial election
- 2023 Nigerian general election
