= 2021 Bokor City Council election =

Local election in Cambodia

- 25 July 2021
- All 13 seats in the Bokor City Council; 7 seats needed for a majority
- Turnout: 100% (Note: Only commune council members can vote in this election)
Party	Leader	Vote %	Seats	+/–
CPP	Hun Sen	100	13	New
This lists parties that won seats. See the complete results below.

The 2021 Bokor City Council election were held on 25 July 2021. This is the first Bokor City Council election, City Council elections will serve five-year terms.

== Background ==
On 30 March 2021 the government of Cambodia declared its intention to establish a new city in the Kampot province, which is located along the coast. Hun Sen signed a sub-decree that states that the new city will be called Bokor City, after Kampot's famous Bokor Mountain.The new city will be located in the Beung Touk, Koh Toch, and Prek Tnout communes, which are all divided from the Teuk Chhou district.

According to Article 78 of the Law on the Election of the council, new city councils must be elected no later than 240 days following the city's founding. However, voting in the Bokor City Council Election is not open to the general public. According to Soryda, the only individuals with voting rights are the current commune council members because the three communes under the Toek Chhou district already existed. However, according to government spokesman Phay Siphan, the election was delayed due to all available resources are being directed toward combating COVID-19; however, elections can be scheduled once conditions improve.

== Contesting Parties ==
The ruling Cambodian People's Party (CPP), the Cambodian Nationality Party (NNP), and the Cambodian Youth Party (CYP) and FUNCINPEC are the parties that have formally registered. Each party has nominated between 26 and 28 candidates for the council, according to NEC.

Party	Party Leader	Seats Contested	Reserve candidates
Cambodian Nationality Party	Seng Sokheng	13 / 13	15 / 15
Cambodian People's Party	Hun Sen	13 / 13	15 / 15
Cambodian Youth Party	Pich Sors	13 / 13	15 / 15
FUNCINPEC	Norodom Ranariddh	13 / 13	13 / 15

== Conduct ==
Polling stations opened at 7:00 am as planned and closed at 7:41 am following the vote casting of all 17 councilors. The NEC emphasized that there were no invalid votes and that the ballot counting process was conducted in a fair and transparent manner under the watchful eyes of political agents, journalists, and national election observers. The ballot counting process began as soon as the polls closed and ended at 8:08 am.

== Results ==
Party	Popular Vote				Seats	
Party	Votes	Vote Change	%	Swing	Seats Won	Seat Change
Cambodian People's Party	17	New	100	New	13	New
FUNCINPEC	0	New	0	New	0	New
Cambodian Youth Party	0	New	0	New	0	New
Cambodia Nationality Party	0	New	0	New	0	New
Total			100%		13	
Valid votes	17					
Invalid/blank votes	0					
Total votes	17					
Registered voters/turnout	17 (100%)					
Source: National Election Committee
