= 2021 Hiroshima gubernatorial election =

Prefectural gubernatorial election in Japan

- 14 November 2021
- Turnout: 34.67% (▲3.58pp)
Candidate	Hidehiko Yuzaki	Takae Nakamura	Masatoshi Tarutani
Party	Independent	JCP	Independent
Popular vote	707,371	65,212	17,600
Percentage	89.5%	8.3%	2.2%
Governor before election
Hidehiko Yuzaki
Independent
Elected Governor
Hidehiko Yuzaki
Independent

The 2021 Hiroshima gubernatorial election (Japanese: 2021年広島県知事選挙) was held to elect the Governor of Hiroshima Prefecture, Japan, on 14 November 2021.

Hidehiko Yuzaki, incumbent since 2009, was eligible to run and won re-election with nearly 90% of votes.

== Results ==
Candidates
Candidate	Age	Political Affiliation	Votes	
Candidate	Age	Political Affiliation	Number	%
Hidehiko Yuzaki	56	Independent	707,371	89.5%
Takae Nakamura	35	Communist	65,212	8.3%
Masatoshi Tarutani	70	Independent	17,600	2.2%
Total valid votes			790,183	100%
Electorate/Turnout			2,304,302	34.67%

Results in wards
Wards	Hidehiko Yuzaki		Takae Nakamura		Masatoshi Tarutani	
Wards	得票	%	得票	%	得票	%
Naka-ku, Hiroshima	29,000	87.0	3,490	10.5	859	2.6
Higashi-ku, Hiroshima	27,465	88.0	3,039	9.7	718	2.3
Minami-ku, Hiroshima	32,466	87.5	3,672	9.9	972	2.6
Nishi-ku, Hiroshima	40,016	87.4	4,550	9.9	1,241	2.7
Asaminami-ku, Hiroshima	53,204	88.6	5,537	9.2	1,319	2.2
Asakita-ku, Hiroshima	35,199	90.0	3,231	8.3	685	1.8
Aki-ku, Hiroshima	19,280	88.8	1,831	8.4	604	2.8
Saeki-ku, Hiroshima	32,090	89.2	3,101	8.6	796	2.2
Kure, Hiroshima	78,694	89.9	5,914	6.8	2,951	3.4
Takehara, Hiroshima	7,964	91.5	588	6.8	154	1.8
Mihara, Hiroshima	25,604	90.5	2,209	7.8	469	1.7
Onomichi	33,843	89.6	3,274	8.3	646	1.7
Fukuyama, Hiroshima	92,311	90.3	8,067	7.9	1,813	1.8
Fuchū, Hiroshima	11,854	91.6	862	6.7	219	1.7
Miyoshi, Hiroshima	17,265	90.2	1,575	8.2	295	1.5
Shōbara, Hiroshima	13,114	89.9	1,300	8.9	172	1.2
Ōtake, Hiroshima	7,783	91.0	580	6.8	187	2.2
Higashihiroshima	46,744	90.0	4,035	7.8	1,166	2.2
Hatsukaichi	32,123	89.8	2,919	8.2	731	2.0
Akitakata, Hiroshima	9,364	92.2	632	6.2	155	1.5
Etajima, Hiroshima	7,629	91.7	526	6.3	163	2.0
Fuchū, Hiroshima	14,017	89.4	1,260	8.0	406	2.6
Kaita, Hiroshima	7,406	89.1	666	8.0	241	2.9
Kumano, Hiroshima	6,744	91.1	460	6.2	196	2.6
Saka, Hiroshima	4,374	91.1	304	6.3	123	2.6
Akiōta, Hiroshima	2,850	93.7	153	5.0	38	1.2
Kitahiroshima, Hiroshima	7,068	91.6	553	7.2	91	1.2
Ōsakikamijima, Hiroshima	3,036	93.4	165	5.1	51	1.6
Sera, Hiroshima	5,599	91.0	458	7.4	97	1.6
Jinsekikōgen, Hiroshima	3,265	91.5	261	7.3	42	1.2
Total	707,371	89.5	65,212	8.3	17,600	2.2
