= 2021 Yobe State local elections =

State election in Nigeria

2021 Yobe local elections
- February 27, 2021

17 chairmen and 178 councillors
	First party
Party	APC
Chairmen	17
Chairmen (+/–)	Steady
Councillors	178
Councillors (+/–)	Steady

The 2021 Yobe State local elections were held on February 27, 2021, to elect 17 local government chairmen and 178 local government councillors in all 17 local government areas. As in the 2017 elections, the Yobe All Progressives Congress won all 17 chairmanship and 178 councillorship seats.

Over one million voters were registered for the election in 1,714 polling units; voting in multiple units had to be relocated due to insecurity. In total, 6 parties participated in the councillorship elections after multiple parties withdrew, although only the APC contested the chairmanship elections. On election day, voting was peaceful with voters, journalists, and Governor Mai Mala Buni reporting high voter turnout. Buni swore in the elected Chairmen on March 3, 2021.

== See also ==
- 2019 Yobe State gubernatorial election
- 2023 Yobe State gubernatorial election
- 2023 Nigerian general election
