= 2021 Delta State local elections =

State elections in Nigeria

- March 6, 2021

25 chairmen and 500 councillors
	First party
Party	PDP
Chairmen	25
Chairmen (+/–)	Steady
Councillors	500
Councillors (+/–)	Steady

The 2021 Delta State local elections were held on March 6, 2021 to elect 25 local government chairmen and 500 local government councillors in all 25 local government areas; it is the first election to be held using new electoral wards after the Delta State Independent Electoral Commission created 34 new wards in December 2020. Party primaries were held from December 7 to December 31, 2020 with January 1, 2021 starting the general election campaign. As in the 2018 elections, the Delta State Peoples Democratic Party won all 25 chairmanship and 500 councillorship seats. The main opposition, the Delta State All Progressives Congress announced a boycott of the elections on election day due to alleged irregularities.

On election day, voting was peaceful according to Delta State Independent Electoral Commission Chairman Mike Ogbodu but concerns over low turnout and underage voting were raised immediately. However, an APC councillorship nominee in Oshimili North LGA claimed that he had won his election before the results were changed in favor of the PDP nominee. DSIEC Director of Public Affairs Arubi Orugboh did not respond to reporter queries on the claims.

== See also ==
- 2019 Delta State gubernatorial election
- 2023 Delta State gubernatorial election
- 2023 Nigerian general election
