= Elections in Australia =

Elections take place periodically to elect the legislature of the Commonwealth of Australia, as well as for each Australian state and territory and for local government councils. Elections in all jurisdictions follow similar principles, although there are minor variations between them. The elections for the Australian Parliament are held under the federal electoral system, which is uniform throughout the country, and the elections for state and territory Parliaments are held under the electoral system of each state and territory. An election day is always a Saturday, but early voting is allowed in the lead-up to it.

Part IV of Chapter 1 of the Australian Constitution briefly deals with eligibility for voting and election to the federal Australian Parliament. It does not prescribe how elections should be conducted. Election campaigns and associated political advertisements are subject to some regulation. Public funding of political parties and party registration was introduced in 1983.

Voting for the federal and each state and territory parliament is compulsory for Australian citizens over the age of 18. Voting is almost entirely conducted using paper ballots. The informal vote is not usually significant, but a donkey vote is more common, and may have a deciding impact in marginal seats.

== Parliaments ==
Voting for the federal and each state and territory parliament is compulsory for Australian citizens over the age of 18.

=== Federal Parliament ===
The Australian Parliament consists of two chambers (known as a bicameral Parliament), the House of Representatives (commonly also referred to as the lower house) and the Senate (also referred to as the upper house). The House of Representatives has 150 members, elected for a maximum term of three years in single-member constituencies (each approximately equal in voters). Elections are conducted by a system of preferential voting (also called alternative voting or instant-runoff voting).

The Senate has 76 senators, elected through a preferential system of proportional representation with a system of single transferable vote, with each state constituting a single constituency normally returning 6 senators every three years and each territory constituting a single constituency returning two senators. Electors in the two territories elect senators for non-fixed terms that are defined by the term of the House of Representatives. State senators normally serve fixed six-year terms, with half of the seats in each State expiring every three years. In the event of a double dissolution, the terms of all the members of the Senate and the House of Representatives seats end immediately.

=== State Parliaments and Territory Legislative Assemblies ===
==== South Australia ====
The Parliament of South Australia is a bicameral legislature. The House of Assembly (lower house) comprises 47 members elected by full preferential voting every 4 years from single member electorates. The Legislative Council (upper house) comprises 22 members elected by proportional representation of single transferable vote every 8 years.

==== Queensland ====
The Parliament of Queensland is unicameral, consisting of the Legislative Assembly of 93 members elected for a 4 year term from single member electorates using full preferential voting.

==== Western Australia ====
The Parliament of Western Australia consists of the Legislative Assembly and the Legislative Council. The Legislative Assembly has 57 members elected for a four-year term, unless dissolved earlier, from single member electorates using fully preferential voting. The Legislative Council has 37 members elected for a fixed term of 4 years, in a 'whole of state' electorate using preferential proportional representation.

== Electoral commissions ==
Elections in Australia are organised by their respective electoral commissions, as follows:

Electoral commissions
Jurisdiction	Electoral commission (year established)	Periodic oversight of legislative seat contests in any given election	Date of most recent major election	Next major election scheduled for / required by
(Australia) Commonwealth	Australian Electoral Commission (1984)	Lower house: All 150 seats in the Australian House of Representatives (every 3 years)	3 May 2025	2028
(Australia) Commonwealth	Australian Electoral Commission (1984)	Upper house: 40 (of the 76) seats in the Australian Senate (every 3 years)	3 May 2025	2028
New South Wales	New South Wales Electoral Commission (2006)	Lower house: All 93 seats in the New South Wales Legislative Assembly (every 4 years)	25 March 2023	13 March 2027
New South Wales	New South Wales Electoral Commission (2006)	Upper house: 21 (of the 42) seats in the New South Wales Legislative Council (every 4 years)	25 March 2023	13 March 2027
Victoria	Victorian Electoral Commission (2002)	Lower house: All 88 seats in the Victorian Legislative Assembly (every 4 years)	26 November 2022	28 November 2026
Victoria	Victorian Electoral Commission (2002)	Upper house: All 40 seats in the Victorian Legislative Council (every 4 years)	26 November 2022	28 November 2026
Queensland	Electoral Commission of Queensland (1992)	Unicameral: All 93 seats in the Legislative Assembly of Queensland (every 4 years)	26 October 2024	28 October 2028
Western Australia	Western Australian Electoral Commission (1987)	Lower house: All 59 seats in the Western Australian Legislative Assembly (every 4 years)	8 March 2025	10 March 2029
Western Australia	Western Australian Electoral Commission (1987)	Upper house: All 36 members in the Western Australian Legislative Council (every 4 years)	8 March 2025	10 March 2029
South Australia	Electoral Commission of South Australia (2009)	Lower house: All 47 seats in the South Australian House of Assembly (every 4 years)	21 March 2026	16 March 2030
South Australia	Electoral Commission of South Australia (2009)	Upper house: 11 (of the 22) seats in the South Australian Legislative Council (every 4 years)	21 March 2026	16 March 2030
Tasmania	Tasmanian Electoral Commission (2005)	Lower house: All 25 seats in the Tasmanian House of Assembly (every 4 years)	19 July 2025	Mid 2029
Tasmania	Tasmanian Electoral Commission (2005)	Upper house: 2 or 3 (of the 15 seats) in the Tasmanian Legislative Council (every year)	24 May 2025	3 May 2026
Australian Capital Territory	Australian Capital Territory Electoral Commission (1992)	Unicameral: All 25 seats of the Australian Capital Territory Legislative Assembly (every 4 years)	19 October 2024	21 October 2028
Northern Territory	Northern Territory Electoral Commission (2004)	Unicameral: All 25 seats in the Northern Territory Legislative Assembly (every 4 years)	24 August 2024	26 August 2028

The Australian Electoral Commission (AEC) is the federal government agency responsible for organising, conducting and supervising federal elections, by-elections and referendums. The AEC is also responsible for setting electoral boundaries and redistributions, and maintains the Commonwealth electoral roll. State and territory electoral commissions perform an equivalent role for state and territory elections. The Australian electoral roll is also used by the state and territory electoral commissions to conduct state, territory and local government elections, except for Western Australia which maintains its own electoral roll.

== Voter enrolment ==
Enrolment on the electoral roll, known in some other countries as registration, is compulsory for all Australian citizens aged 18 years and over. Residents in Australia who had been enrolled as British subjects on 25 January 1984 continue to be enrolled and vote. (Almost 163,000 voters were recorded as British subjects on the electoral roll in 2009.)

As of 2024, the deadline to enrol or update enrolment information such as address is 7 days after the writ of election is issued.

== Election day ==
Each jurisdiction has its own laws and customs as to when elections in the jurisdiction will take place. However, state and territory elections cannot, by federal law, take place within a week before or after a federal election.

According to the Commonwealth Electoral Act 1918, federal elections must be held on a Saturday.

Although elections for the House of Representatives have usually corresponded to half-elections of the Senate, the rules which determine when the elections occur differ. Under the Constitution, the House of Representatives lasts no more than three years after it first meets, but may be dissolved earlier. After the House is dissolved or expires, writs for election must be issued within 10 days and the election must be held on a Saturday between 33 and 58 days after the writs have been issued. The next House must meet within 30 days of the writs being returned.

The terms of senators representing the states are of fixed duration (unless Parliament is dissolved in a double dissolution), and elections must occur within a year before the term expires. The terms of senators representing the territories are not fixed, and are tied to the dates of elections for the House of Representatives. Where a House is dissolved early, House and Senate elections may be asynchronous until either the House is again dissolved sufficiently early or a double dissolution occurs.

The Australian Constitution requires that in half-Senate elections the election of State senators must take place within one year before the places become vacant. As the terms of half the senators end on 30 June, the writs for a half-Senate election cannot be issued earlier than the previous 1 July. There is no constitutional requirement for simultaneous elections for the Senate and the House of Representatives, and elections for half the Senate only have taken place in the past. There is a government and electorate preference for Senate elections to take place simultaneously with those of the House of Representatives. Except in the case of a double dissolution, the Senate is not dissolved when elections for the Senate are called and can continue to sit until the term expires. However, it is now a practice for the Senate to be prorogued when the House is dissolved, so that it does not sit during the election period.

By Westminster convention, the decision as to the type of election and date on which an election is to take place is that of the Prime Minister, who advises the Governor-General to set the process in motion by dissolving the House of Representatives (if it has not expired) and then issuing writs for election.

Writs for the election of House of Representatives and territory senators are issued by the Governor-General, while writs for the election of state senators are issued by the respective state governors. As of 2025, Australia has never held a federal election in January, February or June.

Month	Election
January	None
February	None
March (5)	1901, 1983, 1990, 1993, 1996
April (2)	1910, 1951
May (7)	1913, 1917, 1954, 1974, 2019, 2022, 2025
June	None
July (2)	1987, 2016
August (2)	1943, 2010
September (5)	1914, 1934, 1940, 1946, 2013
October (6)	1929, 1937, 1969, 1980, 1998, 2004
November (7)	1925, 1928, 1958, 1963, 1966, 2001, 2007
December (12)	1903, 1906, 1919, 1922, 1931, 1949, 1955, 1961, 1972, 1975, 1977, 1984

== Voting ==
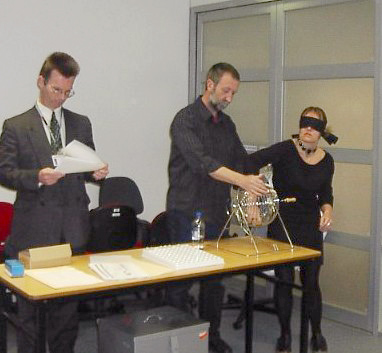
The Australian Electoral Commission holding a blind ballot to determine the order of candidates on the ballot paper

Informal votes at federal elections (%)
Year	Senate	House
1983	9.9	2.5
1984	4.3▼	6.3▲
1987	4.1▼	4.9▼
1990	3.4▼	3.2▼
1993	2.6▼	3.0▼
1996	3.5▲	3.2▲
1998	3.24▼	3.78▲
2001	3.9▲	4.8▲
2004	3.8▼	5.2▲
2007	2.55▼	3.95▼
2010	3.75▲	5.55▲
2013	2.96▼	5.91▲
2016	3.94▲	5.05▼
2019	3.8▼	5.5▲
2022	3.4▼	5.1▼
2025	0.4▲	3.4▲
Source: Australian; Electoral Commission

Voter turnout at federal elections (%)
Year	Senate	House
1983	94.64	94.64
1984	94.55▼	94.19▼
1987	94.34▼	93.84▼
1990	95.81▲	95.31▲
1993	96.22▲	95.75▲
1996	96.20▼	95.77▲
1998	95.34▼	94.99▼
2001	95.20▼	94.85▼
2004	94.82▼	94.32▼
2007	95.17▲	94.76▲
2010	93.83▼	93.22▼
2013	93.88▲	93.23▲
2016	91.93▼	91.01▼
2019	92.48▲	91.89▲
2022	90.47▼	89.82▼
2025	90.70▲	90.83▲
Source: Australian; Electoral Commission

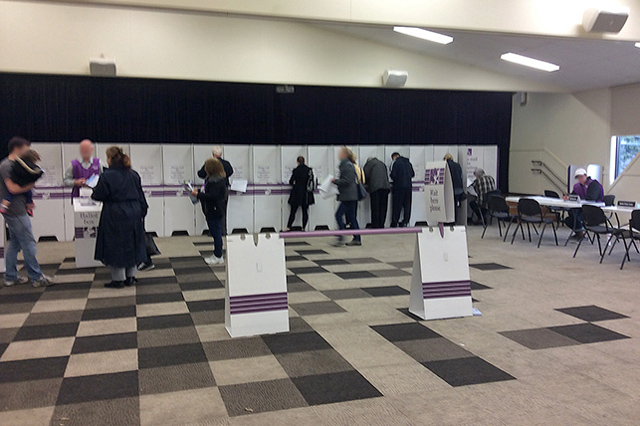
Voting at a polling booth in suburban Melbourne in the 2016 federal election

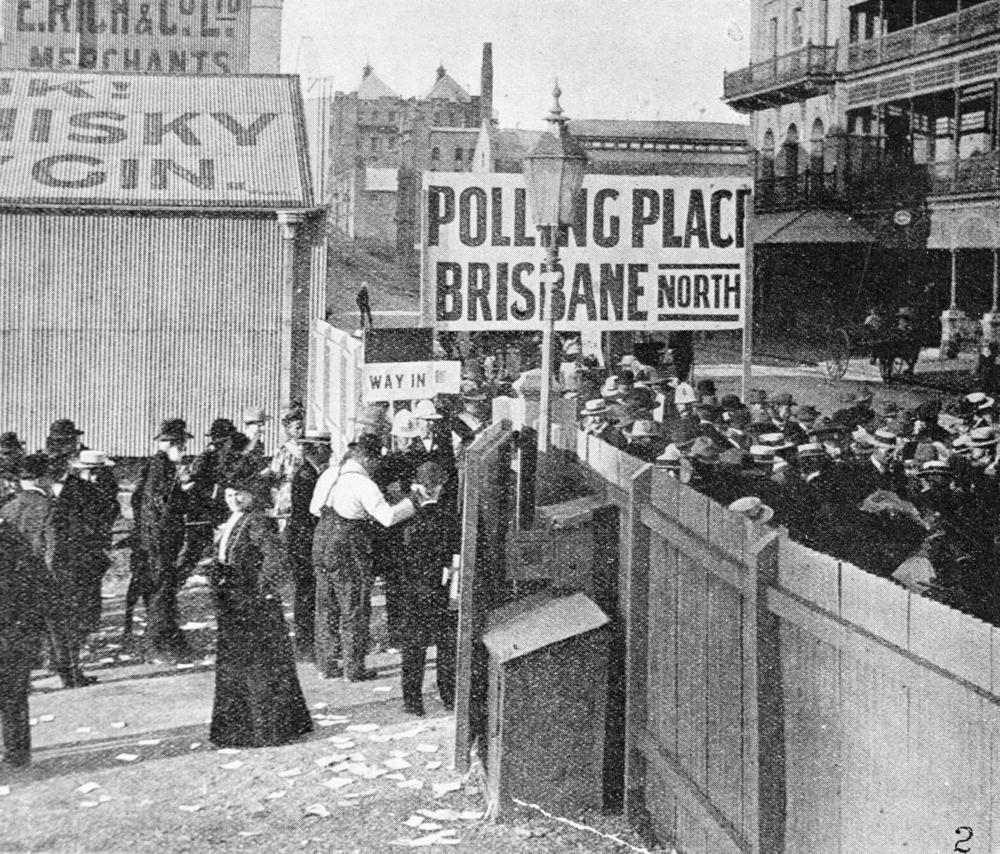
Women voting for the first time in the 1907 Queensland state election

Voting in federal, state and territory elections is compulsory for all persons on the electoral roll. Voting can take place by a person attending in person at any polling place in their State on the election day or in early voting locations, or by applying for and mailing in a postal vote. Voters may apply for postal votes in perpetuity. Absentee voting is also available, but not proxy voting.

At the 2007 federal election there were 7,723 polling places open for voting. In remote areas, hospitals and retirement villages, mobile polling places have been used since the 1980s. The visually impaired can use electronic voting machines.

Voting is almost entirely conducted by paper ballot. If more than one election takes place at the same time (for example, for the House of Representatives and the Senate), separate ballot papers are used, green for House and white for Senate. These are usually of different colours and are deposited into separate boxes.

Upper house polls used to require every square to be numbered, but this became a burden for voters, with some elections including over 200 squares. This has been simplified by the introduction of "Above the line" and "below the line" voting. Votes "above the line" allow voters to number by party/group, whereas "below the line" voting requires preferencing each candidate individually.

How-to-vote cards are usually handed out at polling places by party volunteers. They suggest how a party supporter might vote for other candidates or parties. Electors now routinely receive how-to-vote materials through the mail or by other means.

In practice, privacy arrangements allow informal and protest votes to take place. At the 2010 federal election more than 1.5 million people did not vote or voted incorrectly. Academic Brian Costar from Swinburne University claims the rate of donkey votes in Australia is around 2% of all votes, but the figure is hard to determine accurately.

Most polling places are schools, community halls or churches. Supporters of these places very commonly take advantage of the large number of visitors undertaking fund raising activity, often including raffles, cake stalls and sales of the Australian much loved democracy sausages.

== Parties ==
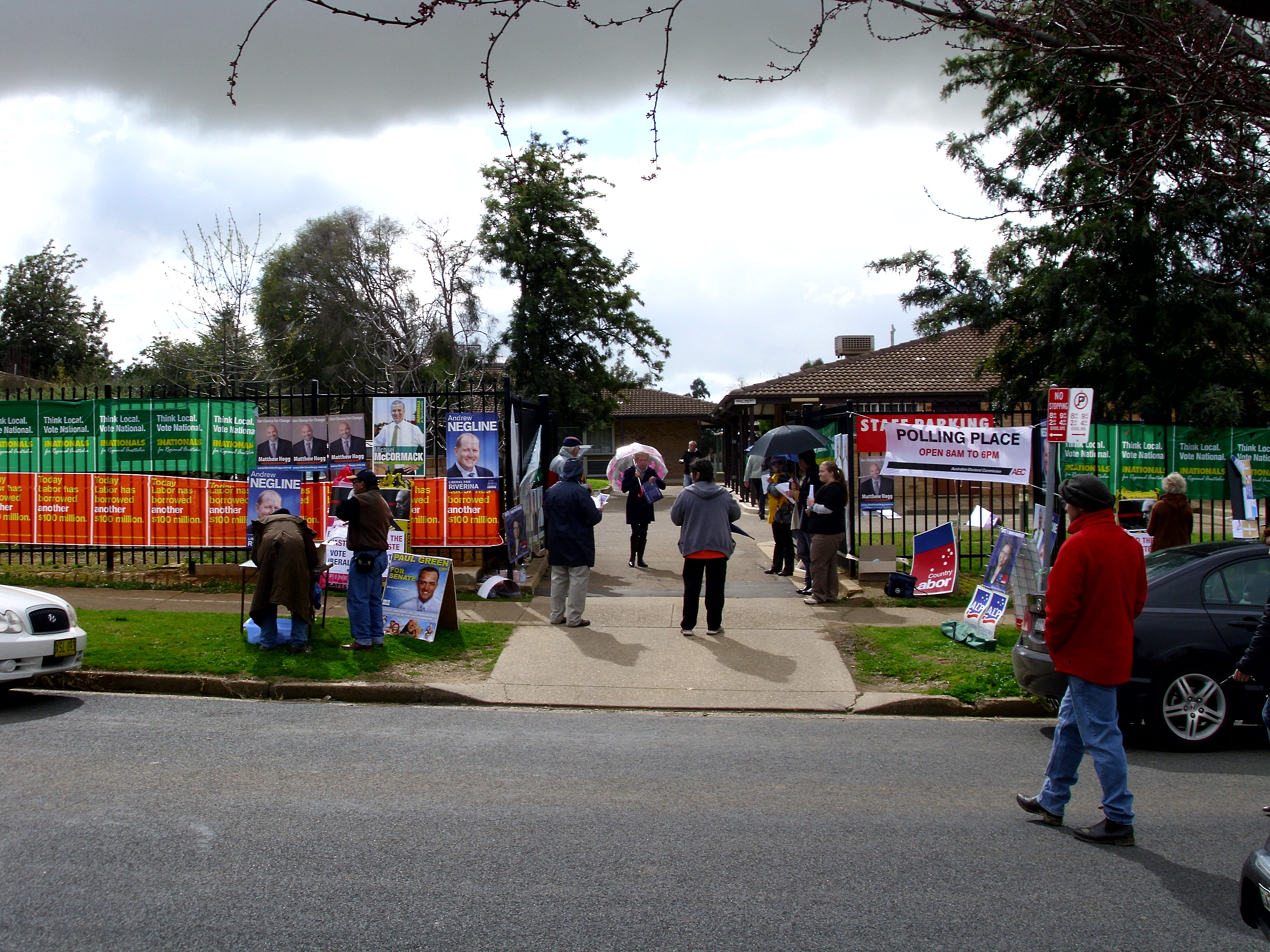
A polling place in New South Wales on election day, 2010

Political parties have certain benefits in Australia's electoral system, including public funding. Political parties must register with the electoral commission in the jurisdiction in which it is proposing to field or endorse candidates. To be eligible for federal registration a party must have at least one member in the Australian Parliament or 1,500 members, and independent candidates are required to provide 50 signatures to be eligible to stand. An unsuccessful challenge to the 500 member requirement was heard by the High Court of Australia in 2004. Other Australian jurisdictions require political parties to have a minimum number of members. For example, New South Wales requires at least 750 members while the ACT and the Northern Territory require 100 members. There are deadlines for registration of a political party.

Australia has a de facto two-party system, with the Australian Labor Party and the Coalition of the Liberal Party of Australia, National Party of Australia, the Liberal National Party and Country Liberal Party dominating Parliamentary elections. It is very difficult for other parties to win representation in the House, let alone form the government, though they may have a strong influence if they hold the "balance of power". However, minor parties and independent candidates have been elected to the Senate by virtue of its more favourable voting system. In recent decades, several parties besides the ALP and the Coalition have secured significant representation in the Senate, notably the DLP (1955–1974); the Australian Democrats (1977–2007); and the Australian Greens and its predecessors (1990–present). Independent and other individual senators have also exercised influence, e.g., Brian Harradine (1975–2005), Family First's Steve Fielding (2005–2011), and Nick Xenophon (2008–2017); and, variously from 1984, representatives of the Nuclear Disarmament Party and One Nation.

Many voters use elections to reaffirm their party allegiance. Party affiliation has declined in recent decades. Voters who voted for the same party each election made up 72% of the electorate in 1967. This figure had declined to 45% by 2007. Minor parties have played a greater role in the politics of Australia since proportional representation was progressively introduced.

Elections in Australia are seen by parties as a chance to develop and refine policies. Rather than a procedure where the best policies win the day, elections are contests where parties fight for power. Elections are not part of the process in which specific decisions on policy are made. Control of policy and platforms are wholly determined within the party.

Candidate selection, in Australia typically called preselection, is a significant factor in the democratic process in Australia because the majority of voters base their decision at election time on the party rather than the candidate. In Australia the decision of who may be a candidate is decided by the party in any manner they choose. It can range from a postal vote to the whole party membership through to a decision made by a small select committee.

=== Election campaigns ===
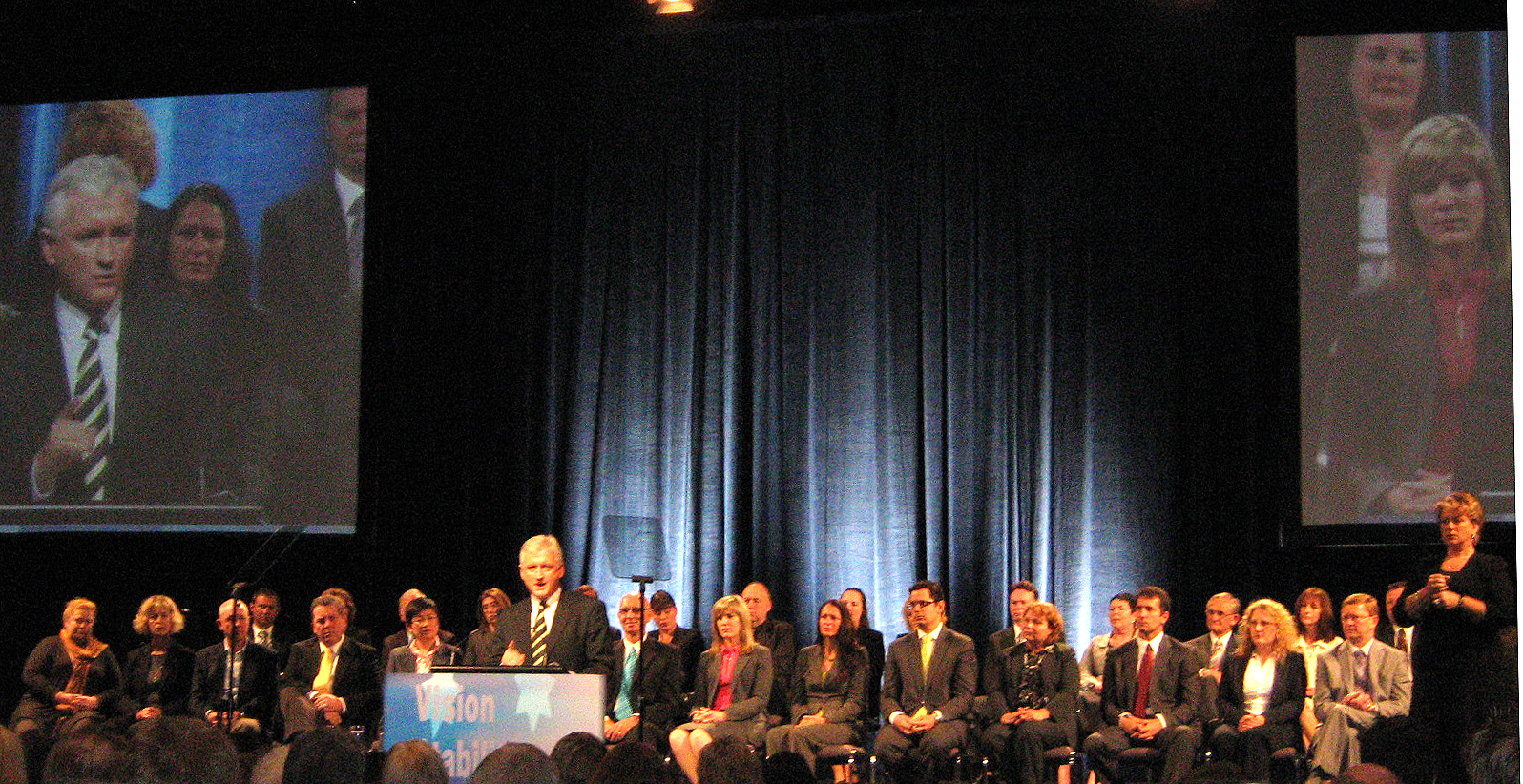
The Labor Party launch at the 2008 Western Australian state election

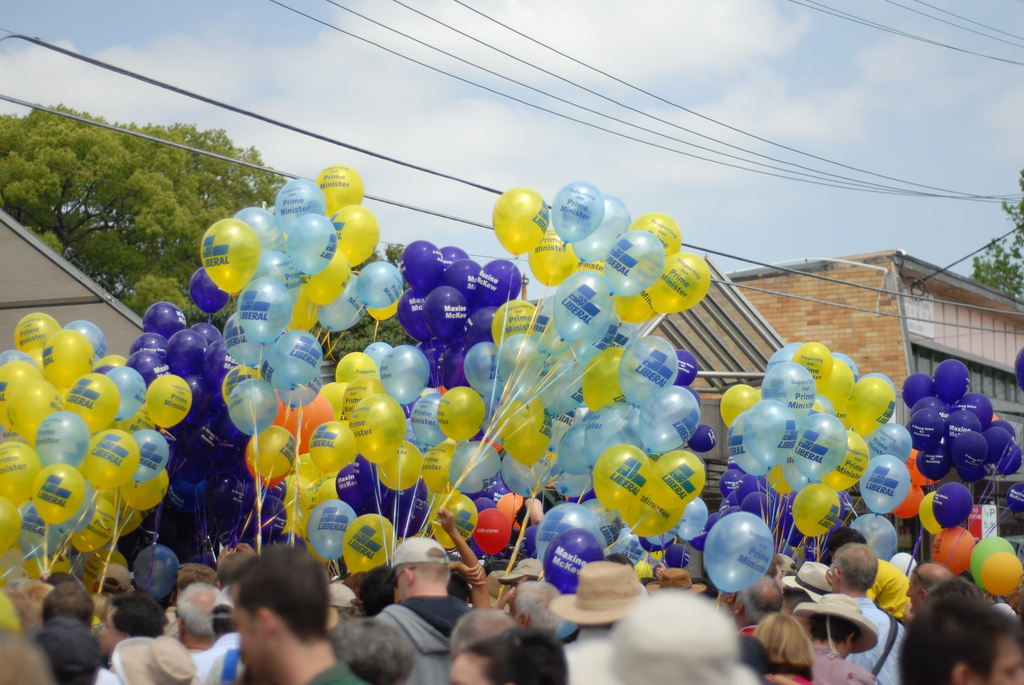
Electioneering during the 2007 Australian federal election campaign, Eastwood, New South Wales

Election campaigns typically involve a televised policy launch, which, despite the name, have increasingly been held towards the end of the campaign. In the 2013 federal election campaign, for example, the Liberal/National and Labor launches were held only 13 days and 6 days respectively prior to election day. From the 1980s onwards direct mailing was seen as a successful way to market, particularly in marginal seats. Major political parties in Australia use databases created from census data, voting records and their own canvassing to shape their direct mail. Quantitative surveys of samples from the wide population as well as focus groups are used by the parties for market research during election campaigns.

The Commonwealth Electoral Act 1918 stipulates that political advertisements display the name and address of the individual authorising them. The Broadcasting Services Act 1922 bans the broadcast of advertisements in the three days prior to an election. A ban on broadcast election advertising was imposed under the Political Broadcasts and Political Disclosures Act 1991 but was overturned by the High Court of Australia in 1992. Party registration rules have become stricter, especially in New South Wales.

Television is the preferred medium for campaign news in Australia. At the 2004 federal election more than three-quarters of money spent on advertising was television based.

Incumbent candidates and government have significant benefits compared to non-incumbents. These include substantial allowances and access to staff whose travel is covered by parliamentary allowances.

The Australian Election Study coordinated by the Australian National University was introduced in 1987. The series of surveys are conducted post election and provide a unique take on political behaviour during election campaigns.

== Public funding ==
Australia's first partial public election funding was introduced in 1981 by the then Premier of New South Wales Neville Wran. The Commonwealth Electoral Legislation Amendment Act 1983 brought forward by the Hawke government introduced public election funding and the requirement that all minor donations to parties be disclosed. Amendments to legislation were needed due to the changing nature of election campaigns in the late 1960s and 1970s. Opinion polling, widespread advertising and the rise of the hired campaign professionals meant campaigning had become far more expensive than in previous decades.

Public funding is the preferred means to cover costs rather than corporate donations. However, the majority of the major parties funding is still sourced from private donors. If a candidate or party receives at least 4% of the primary vote at a federal election they are eligible for public funding. The amount of funding paid is calculated by multiplying the number of first preference votes received by the rate of payment at that time, which is indexed in line with the Consumer Price Index. It is possible for a candidate to receive more public funding than what was spent on campaigning as was the case in Pauline Hanson's 2004 attempt to win a seat in the Australian Senate.

In Queensland, the threshold for public funding is 6% of the primary vote. The threshold in Victoria, Western Australia and the Australian Capital Territory is 4%. South Australia, Tasmania and the Northern Territory do not have public funding for parties and candidates at elections.

== Caretaker convention ==
A series of conventions has evolved covering the conduct of the business of government by ministers, their departments of state, and the Public Service during the "caretaker period" of the election. This period begins after the announcement of the election date, when the Governor-General of Australia dissolves the federal parliament on advice from the Prime Minister. It ends after the election result is known and clear, when a newly elected government is sworn into office.

== Federal lower house primary, two-party and seat results ==
A two-party system has existed in the Australian House of Representatives since the two non-Labor parties merged in 1909. The 1910 election was the first to elect a majority government, with the Australian Labor Party concurrently winning the first Senate majority. Prior to 1909 a three-party system existed in the chamber. A two-party-preferred vote (2PP) has been calculated since the 1919 change from first-past-the-post to preferential voting and subsequent introduction of the Coalition. ALP = Australian Labor Party, L+NP = grouping of Liberal/National/LNP/CLP Coalition parties (and predecessors), Oth = other parties and independents.

1901-1906 House of Representatives results
Election Year		Labor	Free Trade	Protectionist	Independent	Other Parties		Total seats
Election Year		Labor	Free Trade	Protectionist	Independent	Name	Seats	Total seats
1st	1901	16	25	32	2	—N/a	—N/a	75
2nd	1903	22	24	26	2	Revenue Tariff	1	75
Election Year		Labor	Anti-Socialist	Protectionist	Independent	Other Parties		Total seats
Election Year		Labor	Anti-Socialist	Protectionist	Independent	Name	Seats	Total seats
3rd	1906	26	26	16	5	Western Australian	2	75

1910-present House of Representatives results
Election Date	Primary vote			2PP vote		Seats			
Election Date	ALP	L/NP	Oth.	ALP	L/NP	ALP	L/NP	Oth.	Total
13 April 1910 election	50.0%	45.1%	4.9%	—N/a	—N/a	42	31	2	75
31 May 1913 election	48.5%	48.9%	2.6%	—N/a	—N/a	37	38	—N/a	75
5 September 1914 election	50.9%	47.2%	1.9%	—N/a	—N/a	42	32	1	75
5 May 1917 election	43.9%	54.2%	1.9%	—N/a	—N/a	22	53	—N/a	75
13 December 1919 election	42.5%	54.3%	3.2%	45.9%	54.1%	26	48	1	75
16 December 1922 election	42.3%	47.8%	9.9%	48.8%	51.2%	29	40	6	75
14 November 1925 election	45.0%	53.2%	1.8%	46.2%	53.8%	23	50	2	75
17 November 1928 election	44.6%	49.6%	5.8%	48.4%	51.6%	31	42	2	75
12 October 1929 election	48.8%	44.2%	7.0%	56.7%	43.3%	46	24	5	75
19 December 1931 election	27.1%	48.4%	24.5%	41.5%	58.5%	14	50	11	75
15 September 1934 election	26.8%	45.6%	27.6%	46.5%	53.5%	18	42	14	74
23 October 1937 election	43.2%	49.3%	7.5%	49.4%	50.6%	29	43	2	74
21 September 1940 election	40.2%	43.9%	15.9%	50.3%	49.7%	32	36	6	74
21 August 1943 election	49.9%	31.3%	18.6%	58.2%	41.8%	49	23	2	74
28 September 1946 election	49.7%	39.3%	11.0%	54.1%	45.9%	43	26	5	74
10 December 1949 election	46.0%	50.3%	3.7%	49.0%	51.0%	47	74	—N/a	121
28 April 1951 election	47.6%	50.3%	2.1%	49.3%	50.7%	52	69	—N/a	121
29 May 1954 election	50.0%	46.8%	3.2%	50.7%	49.3%	57	64	—N/a	121
10 December 1955 election	44.6%	47.6%	7.8%	45.8%	54.2%	47	75	—N/a	122
22 November 1958 election	42.8%	46.6%	10.6%	45.9%	54.1%	45	77	—N/a	122
9 December 1961 election	47.9%	42.1%	10.0%	50.5%	49.5%	60	62	—N/a	122
30 November 1963 election	45.5%	46.0%	8.5%	47.4%	52.6%	50	72	—N/a	122
26 November 1966 election	40.0%	50.0%	10.0%	43.1%	56.9%	41	82	1	124
25 October 1969 election	47.0%	43.3%	9.7%	50.2%	49.8%	59	66	—N/a	125
2 December 1972 election	49.6%	41.5%	8.9%	52.7%	47.3%	67	58	—N/a	125
18 May 1974 election	49.3%	44.9%	5.8%	51.7%	48.3%	66	61	—N/a	127
13 December 1975 election	42.8%	53.1%	4.1%	44.3%	55.7%	36	91	—N/a	127
10 December 1977 election	39.7%	48.1%	12.2%	45.4%	54.6%	38	86	—N/a	124
18 October 1980 election	45.2%	46.3%	8.5%	49.6%	50.4%	51	74	—N/a	125
5 March 1983 election	49.5%	43.6%	6.9%	53.2%	46.8%	75	50	—N/a	125
1 December 1984 election	47.6%	45.0%	7.4%	51.8%	48.2%	82	66	—N/a	148
11 July 1987 election	45.8%	46.1%	8.1%	50.8%	49.2%	86	62	—N/a	148
24 March 1990 election	39.4%	43.5%	17.1%	49.9%	50.1%	78	69	1	148
13 March 1993 election	44.9%	44.3%	10.7%	51.4%	48.6%	80	65	2	147
2 March 1996 election	38.7%	47.3%	14.0%	46.4%	53.6%	49	94	5	148
3 October 1998 election	40.1%	39.5%	20.4%	51.0%	49.0%	67	80	1	148
10 November 2001 election	37.8%	43.0%	19.2%	49.0%	51.0%	65	82	3	150
9 October 2004 election	37.6%	46.7%	15.7%	47.3%	52.7%	60	87	3	150
24 November 2007 election	43.4%	42.1%	14.5%	52.7%	47.3%	83	65	2	150
21 August 2010 election	38.0%	43.3%	18.7%	50.1%	49.9%	72	72	6	150
7 September 2013 election	33.4%	45.6%	21.0%	46.5%	53.5%	55	90	5	150
2 July 2016 election	34.7%	42.0%	23.3%	49.6%	50.4%	69	76	5	150
18 May 2019 election	33.3%	41.4%	25.3%	48.5%	51.5%	68	77	6	151
21 May 2022 election	32.6%	35.7%	31.7%	52.1%	47.9%	77	58	16	151
3 May 2025 election	34.6%	31.8%	33.6%	55.3%	44.7%	94	43	13	150

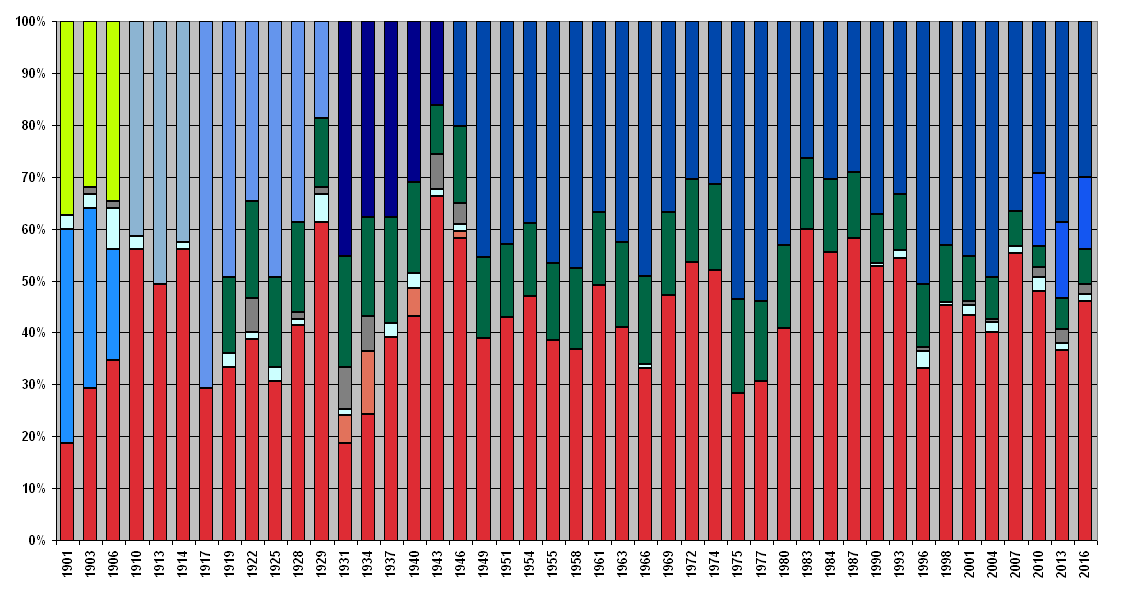
Electoral results in all elections to the Australian House of Representatives. Australian Labor Party Liberal Party of Australia National Party of Australia Nationalist Party of Australia United Australia Party Commonwealth Liberal Party Lang Labor Free Trade Party Protectionist Party Independent Liberal National Party of Queensland Others

== Landslide election records ==
State and territory elections:

- 2021 Western Australian state election – Mark McGowan led the Labor Party to win 53 out of the 59 seats in the lower house. The Labor Party had a primary vote of 59.92% and a two-party-preferred vote of 69.68%. The National Party won 4 seats and the Liberal Party won 2 seats, making the National Party the official opposition, the first time they had held this status since the 1940s.

To date, the election is the most decisive result at any Australian state or federal election since Federation, in terms of both percentage of lower house seats controlled by the governing party (89.8%) and two-party preferred margin.

Map displaying Labor's landslide victory at the 2021 Western Australian state election. Seats won by Labor are in red, seats won by the Liberals are in blue and seats won by the Nationals are in green.

- 2011 New South Wales state election – Barry O'Farrell led the Liberal–National Coalition to a landslide victory defeating the incumbent Labor Party Premier, Kristina Keneally with 64.22% of the two-party-preferred vote. The incoming government received 69 of the 93 seats in the New South Wales Legislative Assembly. The Labor Party by contrast lost more than half of their seat total.
- 1978 New South Wales state election – Neville Wran led the Labor Party to a landslide victory with a primary vote of 57.77%. the largest primary vote for any party in a century.

== Perennial candidates records ==
- William McCristal was one of the most prolific unsuccessful candidates for political office in Australian history. He contested the 1917, 1919, 1943, 1949, 1951, 1954, 1955 and 1958 federal elections and the 1907, 1910 , 1922, 1925, 1944, 1947, 1950, 1953, 1956 and 1962 state elections, as well as a 1954 by-election.
- Ben Buckley, a farmer, has unsuccessfully contested Gippsland in the House of Representatives on 11 occasions. He first contested the seat in 1984, and has contested every election since 2001. An independent on six occasions, Buckley ran as a One Nation candidate in 2004, and has run as a Liberal Democrat in the past four elections (2008, 2010, 2013, and 2016). His best result came in 2010 when he polled 5.52% of the vote.
- Anthony Fels has, as of 2022, contested eight state elections in Western Australia and six federal elections. He was successful on one occasion, winning a seat in the Western Australian Legislative Council in 2005. He first ran for parliament in 1996 and was a member of the Liberal Party until 2008. His later bids for office have included candidacies and with Family First (2008), Katter's Australian Party (2013), the Mutual Party (2014), the Non-Custodial Parents Party (2017), the United Australia Party (2019), and the Western Australia Party (2022), in addition to several runs as an independent (2010, 2013, 2017, 2021).
- Pauline Hanson, founder and leader of One Nation, a right-wing populist political party, had unsuccessfully contested state and federal elections before being elected in the 2016 federal election. She ran in the 2001, 2004, 2007 for the federal Senate Queensland. She ran in the 2003 and 2011 for the NSW state Legislative Council, and 2009 and 2015 for QLD State election.
- Teresa van Lieshout, a resident of Perth, has unsuccessfully contested seven state and federal elections standing for various constituencies in Western Australia. She has stood for the Parliament of Western Australia as a One Nation candidate at the 2005 election, and as an independent at the 2006 Victoria Park by-election, 2013 state election, and 2014 Vasse by-election. For Federal Parliament, she ran as an independent at the 2004 election and 2014 special senate election, and as a Protectionist candidate at the 2013 election. In August 2015, she announced she would be contested the eighth election, the 2015 Canning by-election. Van Lieshout stood for the Senate in NSW in the 2016 federal election, and as an independent in the 2018 Batman by-election.
- Jim Saleam, a veteran anti-immigration activist and president of the Australia First Party, has contested seven times in state and federal elections.
- Shirley de la Hunty (née Strickland), a multiple Olympic gold medallist in athletics, unsuccessfully contested six state elections in Western Australia and seven federal elections. Her candidacies spanned from 1971 to 1996 and included runs for the lower and upper houses at both state and federal levels. She stood a number of times for the Australian Democrats, while the rest of her runs were made as an independent candidate.
- Charles Bellchambers contested the Division of Barton six times between 1966 and 1987, usually polling a negligible proportion of the vote.
- Alex Bhathal, a social worker, unsuccessfully stood for the Greens in the Division of Batman six times between 2001 and 2018, increasing the Greens' percentage of the vote from 4.60% in 1998 to 39.49% in 2018 (she did not stand in 2007).
- Craig Garland, a Tasmanian fisherman, contested the seat of Braddon, on both the state and federal level, as an independent a combined total of four times from 2018 to 2022, including the seat's 2018 federal by-election, as well as running for the Senate in 2019 where he polled just over 1% of the vote. He was successfully elected to the Tasmanian House of Assembly during the state's 2024 snap election with just over 5% of the vote, which represented his sixth attempt at candidacy.
- Riccardo Bosi, leader of the unregistered Australia One party, ran in 2019, 2020 Eden-Monaro by-election and 2022 federal elections, and for 2020 Queensland state election and 2023 New South Wales state election.

== See also ==
- List of Australian federal elections
- List of Australian federal by-elections
- Proportional Representation Society of Australia
