= Voter registration in Australia =

Listing of persons who are eligible to vote

In Australia, voter registration is called enrolment. Enrolment is a prerequisite for voting at federal elections, by-elections and referendums, as well as all state and local government elections; and it is generally compulsory for enrolled persons to vote unless otherwise exempted or excused. Enrolment is compulsory for Australian citizens over 18 years of age who have lived at their current address for at least one month. Enrolment is not compulsory for persons with no fixed address who are not already enrolled. Residents in Australia who had been enrolled as British subjects on 24 January 1984, though not Australian citizens, continue to be enrolled, and cannot opt out of enrolment. (These comprise almost 163,000 voters in 2009.) For local government elections, an elector generally does not require to be an Australian citizen. Once enrolled, a person cannot opt out of enrolment. Enrolment is optional for 16- or 17-year-olds, but they cannot vote until they turn 18, and persons who have applied for Australian citizenship may also apply for provisional enrolment which takes effect on the granting of citizenship.

Once enrolled, every enrolled person must update their address details within 8 weeks of the change. This also applies to persons enrolled with no fixed address, and enrolled British subjects.

A person who has been convicted of treason or treachery and has not been pardoned, or who is serving a sentence of three years or longer for an offence against the law of the Commonwealth or of a State or Territory, is not entitled to be enrolled on the federal roll. They are removed from the federal electoral roll and must re-enroll when their disqualification ceases. The states may have different disqualifying periods, such as Victoria which has a disqualifying period of five year imprisonment.

Though enrolment is compulsory, at the close of rolls prior to the 2013 federal election, about 1.3 million people otherwise eligible to vote had not been enrolled, about one-third of whom were aged between 18 and 24. At June 2014, there were 14.9 million electors on the federal roll, and the number not enrolled was 1.2 million, resulting in a "participation rate" of 92.5%, up from 91.4% at 30 June 2013. At the close of roll for the 2019 federal election, the participation rate was 96.8%. At the 2013 federal election, there were 14,723,385 registered electors, of whom 93.2% actually voted (called the “turnout”). At the 2019 federal election, there were 16,419,543 registered electors, and the turnout was 91.9%.

== History ==
The earliest electoral roll in Australia was prepared in 1843 by the then colony of New South Wales for the election by eligible landholders of 24 members of the New South Wales Legislative Council, and electoral rolls were prepared for each election thereafter. Following Australia's federation in 1901, state electoral rolls (successors of the previous colonial rolls) were used for federal elections until a permanent federal electoral roll was compiled in 1908. The federal voter qualifications and enrolment processes were uniform in all the states. For some years afterwards, the states continued to compile their own electoral rolls, but these have now been discontinued, except for Western Australia which continues to maintain a separate state electoral roll.

Enrolment on the federal electoral roll of eligible voters has been compulsory since 1911. However, Indigenous Australians were generally denied a vote until 1962, after which enrolment was voluntary until 1984. At the time, the requirement to register applied to "British subjects" over the age of 21. The voting age, and consequential requirement to register, was reduced to 18 in 1974. In 1984, the criteria for the right to vote, and requirement to register, became Australian citizenship. Residents in Australia who had been enrolled as British subjects on 25 January 1984 could continue to be enrolled, without taking Australian citizenship. The compulsory requirements continued to apply to them, so that they could not opt out of the enrolment, and must keep their details updated, and vote. (Today, these comprise about 9% of enrolments.)

In 1984, the closing date for the lodgement of changes to the electoral roll was extended to 7 days after an election is called. In 2006, new laws were passed in time for the 2007 federal election, reducing the period for new enrolments from 7 days to 8 pm on the same business day as the issue of the writs, and until 8 pm on the third business day after the issue of the writs for the update of address details. To give new voters more time to enrol for the 2007 election, the writs were issued three days after the election was announced. During these three days, 77,000 new enrolment applications were received. On 6 August 2010, the High Court in Rowe v Electoral Commissioner ruled that the 2006 amendment was invalid, extending the close of rolls by one week, allowing additional eligible voters to enrol and vote in the 2010 federal election. Supplementary lists of additional voters were distributed to polling places, and these voters were also contacted by the AEC via postal mail.

Enrolment has also been compulsory for residents of Norfolk Island since 1 July 2016.

== Voter registration procedures ==
The functions of the Australian Electoral Commission (AEC) include maintaining voter registration records and the preparation of electoral rolls. The AEC maintains a permanent electoral roll, which is updated continuously, and which is used for federal elections, by-elections and referendums. It also forms the basis of state (except in Western Australia, which compiles its own) and local electoral rolls. Since 2009, New South Wales has used information from various government departmental sources to automatically update enrolment details onto the state roll, but not the federal roll. State civil registrars are required to supply information, for example relating to death of a person, to enable names of deceased persons to be removed from electoral rolls, and prison wardens are required to provide details on prisoners’ terms. Special rules apply to citizens going or living outside the country, to military personnel and to prisoners, all of which do not reside at their normal residential address for electoral purposes. Homeless people or those otherwise with no fixed address have a particular problem with registration, not having a current address to give. Special rules also apply to Australians who are going to be abroad on election days.

If a change of address causes an individual to move to another electorate (electoral division), they are legally obliged to notify the AEC within 8 weeks. The AEC monitors house and apartment sales and sends a reminder (and a form) to new residents if they have moved to another electorate, making compliance with the law easier. The AEC conducts periodic door-to-door and postal campaigns to try to ensure that all eligible persons are registered in the correct electorate. An individual has 8 weeks after turning 18 to register and the 8-week period also applies to update of details. Failure to enrol or update details can incur a fine. However, citizens who later enrol themselves are protected from prosecution for not enrolling in the previous years by section 101(7) of the Commonwealth Electoral Act 1918.

Normally, new enrolments or changes in enrolment details can be done online or by mailing in an enrolment form. The AEC determines to which electoral divisions a person belongs from their residential address. Federal constituencies are officially termed divisions, and state constituencies are officially termed electoral districts. At both levels, though, they are popularly referred to as electorates or seats.

== Closing of electoral roll before an election ==
Enrolment and change of details forms must arrive at the AEC by the “closing of the roll”, which is announced when an election is called. Enrolment forms received by the AEC after that date are not processed until after the election. Unlike most jurisdictions which close updating of electoral records with reference to a number of days before an election, commonly 14 or 28 days, or allow registration at the same time as attending a polling station to vote, Australia closes its rolls 7 days after an election is called, rather than with reference to the election day. For federal elections they are closed about a week after the issue of writs for election, which must be issued within 10 days of the dissolution or expiration of the House of Representatives. For the 2016 federal election, that was 38 days before election day. For the 2019 federal election, the close of roll was 30 days before election day, but 11 before start of early voting.

Historically, many people either enrol or change their enrolment details after an election is called and before the roll closing day. For example, prior to the 2004 federal election, 423,993 changes to enrolment were received before the rolls closed. Of these, 78,816 were new enrolments and 225,314 were changes of address.

The closing dates may vary for state and territory elections.

== Electoral rolls ==
In Australia, the voter register is called an electoral roll. The AEC maintains a permanent electoral roll, which is used for federal elections, by-elections and referendums. The federal electoral roll also forms the basis of state (except in Western Australia, which compiles its own) and local electoral rolls. Each state and territory can regulate its own part of the federal electoral roll. For example, New South Wales has adopted the "Smart Roll" system, introduced in 2009, which draws information from various government departmental sources and enrolls eligible electors automatically on to the state roll, but not the federal roll. A protection in Section 101 (8) exists for offences prior to enrolment (including failure to enrol) for those enrolled in such a way by the Electoral Commissioner.

Anyone serving a prison sentence of 3 years or more is removed from the federal roll, and must apply to re-enrol upon release; but in Victoria, a person is struck off the roll if serving a prison sentence of 5 years, so that a person serving a term of 3–5 years, is removed from the federal roll but not the state roll. The qualification of an elector for local government elections generally do not require that they be Australian citizens.

An electoral roll is a compilation that lists persons who are entitled to vote for particular elections. The list is usually broken down by electoral districts, and is primarily prepared to assist election officials at polling places.

Electoral rolls and voter registration serve a number of functions, especially to streamline voting on election day. Voter registration can be used to detect electoral fraud by enabling authorities to verify an applicant's identity and entitlement to a vote, and to ensure a person does not vote multiple times. The electoral roll is also used to indicate whether a person has failed to vote, which is also compulsory in Australia.

== See also ==
- Elections in Australia
- Australian electoral system
- Australian Electoral Commission
