= Magama, Nigeria =

Magama
- LGA
- Interactive map of Magama
- Location in Nigeria
- Coordinates: 10°28′N 5°03′E
- Country: Nigeria
- State: Niger State
- Headquarter: Nasko

Government
  - Local Government Chairman and the Head of the Local Government Council: Idris Aliyu Babangida

Area
  - Total: 4,107 km^{2} (1,586 sq mi)

Population (2006 census)
  - Total: 181,653
  - Density: 44.23/km^{2} (114.6/sq mi)
- Time zone: UTC+1 (WAT)
- 3-digit postal code prefix: 923
- ISO 3166 code: NG.NI.MM

Magama is a Local Government Area in Niger State, Nigeria. Its headquarters are in the town of Nasko in the west of the area.

It has an area of 4,107 km^{2} and a population of 181,653 at the 2006 census.

The postal code of the area is 923.

== Geography ==
=== Towns and villages ===
Magama has towns and villages such as:

- Ifana
- Nasko

== Climate ==
The weather in Magama is savanna tropical. With both a wet and dry season, it is warm every month. There is roughly 507 mm (20.0 in) of rain every year in Magama, and the average annual temperature is 35 degrees Celsius (95 degrees Fahrenheit). Averaging 55% humidity and a UV-index of 7, it is dry for 186 days out of every year.
