= Santa Justa Klan =

Spanish tv-based band (2005–2006)

- Origin: Madrid, Spain
- Genres: Pop
- Years active: 2005–2006
- Label: EMI
- Past members: Víctor Elías; Natalia Sánchez; Adrián Rodríguez; Andrés de la Cruz

Santa Justa Klan was a Spanish band that emerged from the TV show Los Serrano. It was formed by several of the actors in the series: Víctor Elías, Natalia Sánchez, Adrián Rodríguez and Andrés de la Cruz. The target audience was children who had sent in letters referring to the sometimes troubling situations which occur in school between boys and girls. In the series, the leader of the group is Guille (Elías). From their first album they released two singles: "A Toda Mecha", which launched them to fame, and "Del 1 al 10 (From One to Ten)".

== History ==
In 2006 they released their second studio album, "DPM" on the Dro Atlantic label, which followed the lines of the first album, talking about issues that occurred at school. Their first single was "Con Angelina Jollie me va la olla" and the second one was "Como toques mi bocadillo te muerdo (Boliche's anthem)". On August 2, a presentation tour of the album began in Ibiza but finally the group disbanded in 2007 due to the limited success of this second album.

== Group members ==
- Víctor Elías
- Natalia Sánchez
- Adrián Rodríguez
- Andrés de la Cruz

== Discography ==
=== SJK (2005) ===
1. A toda mecha
2. Adiós papá
3. Soy la caña
4. Yo paso del amor
5. Del 1 al 10
6. Metrosexual
7. Me pica
8. Nadie manda
9. La profesora de inglés
10. Pienso en ti constantemente
11. Estoy pá' alla
12. Me piro

=== DPM (2006) ===
1. Con Angelina Jolie se me va la olla
2. D.P.M.
3. Bésame
4. Después del tono
5. Primero lo primero
6. Entre muñecas
7. Primer encuentro
8. Ke te pires
9. Paso de ti
10. Quiero despegar
11. Outro (Boliche's anthem)
