= Adrián Rodríguez (actor) =

Spanish actor and singer (born 1988)

- Born: Adrián Rodríguez Moya; 28 November 1988 (age 37); Cornellà de Llobregat, Barcelona, Spain
- Occupations: Actor; Singer
- Years active: 1999–present
- Parent(s): Antonio Rodíguez and Ana Moya

Adrián Rodríguez Moya (born 28 November 1988) is a Spanish actor and singer. He is best known for his roles in television series Los Serrano and Física o Química, and as a former member of band Santa Justa Klan.

== Biography ==
Rodríguez was born on 28 November 1988 in the town of Cornellà de Llobregat near Barcelona. He is the son of Antonio Rodíguez and Ana Moya.

== Career ==
He made his acting debut as DVD in Telecinco television series Los Serrano in 2005. While working on Los Serrano, he formed the band Santa Justa Klan alongside his co–stars Víctor Elías, Natalia Sánchez and Andrés de la Cruz. Santa Justa Klan released two Platinum certificated albums, SJK in 2005 and DPM in 2006. Rodríguez then made a brief appearances in 2007 film El vuelo del guirre. In 2008 he began working on his debut album, releasing hip hop singles "Si empieza a llover", "La distancia", "Vidas diferentes" and "Ready".

In 2009 Rodríguez began working on the Antena 3 television series Física o Química as David, a teenager who hides that he is a homosexual before coming out of the closet. The show focuses on teenage issues such as addictions, anorexia and sexual orientation. The series has attracted a lot of polemics. Rodríguez's co–star Javier Calvo stated the themes of the series are "problems that are also present in reality". Award, best actor at "Grand Prix Corallo Città di Alghero" 9 July 2011. On 29 June 2012 Adrián Rodríguez has made his musical debut in the beautiful Italian Tuscan Versilia.

== Filmography ==
Television
Year	Title	Role	Notes
2005–2008	Los Serrano	David "DVD" Borna	74 episodes
2009	U.C.O.	Montejas	1 episode
2009–2011	Física o Química	David Ferrán Quintanilla	50 episodes
2012	Gocca	Héctor	1 episode
2012	Cenizas y el Edén	Sergio	1 episode
2014	Los misterios de Laura	Sergio	1 episode
2014	#XQEsperar	Adrián	10 episodes
2014–2016	Chiringuito de Pepe	Daniel "Dani" Valiente Leal	26 episodes
2015–2016	Tu cara me suena 4	Contestant	5th place
2016	Levántate All Stars	Contestant with Christian Mulas "Keibi"	4th eliminateds
2018	Supervivientes: Perdidos en Honduras (2018)	Contestant	Abandoned
2020–2021	Física o Química: El reencuentro	David Ferrán Quintanilla	2 episodes
Film
Year	Title	Role	Notes
2007	El vuelo del guirre	Zeben	Main Cast

== Discography ==
=== Solo ===
Year	Single	Album	Featuring artist	Notes
1999	"Salomé"	Menudas Estrellas	Chayanne	
2008	"Si empieza a llover"	Upcoming debut album		
2008	"La distancia"	Upcoming debut album	Jonseslife	
2009	"Vidas diferentes"	Upcoming debut album	Jonseslife and KBZ	
2009	"Ready"	Upcoming debut album	Josepo	
