= Médico de familia =

- Genre: Comedy drama
- Directed by: Daniel Écija (1995–1996); Jesús del Cerro and Juan Carlos Cueto (1996–1999); Ana Maroto (1999)
- Starring: Emilio Aragón; Lydia Bosch; Pedro Peña; Luisa Martín; Antonio Molero; Francis Lorenzo; Gemma Cuervo; Aarón Guerrero; Lola Baldrich
- Country of origin: Spain
- Original language: Spanish
- No. of episodes: 119

Production
- Executive producer: Gestevisión Telecinco
- Producers: Globomedia; Daniel Écija

Original release
- Network: Telecinco
- Release: 12 September 1995 – 21 December 1999

Médico de familia (Family Doctor) is a Spanish comedy drama television series produced by Globomedia for Telecinco. The series premiered at the end of 1995, to become the most popular Tuesday night show for four years and made Telecinco a popular national broadcaster. It has been adapted and broadcast in Germany, Belgium, Finland, Italy, Portugal and Russia, among other countries. Its Italian adaptation surpassed it in episodes and was broadcast till 2016.

== The series ==
It follows the life and struggles of a young doctor, Dr. Nacho Martín (Emilio Aragón) a widower who was left with three children and an adolescent nephew in his charge and is trying to rebuild his family life.

Another main character is his sister-in-law (played by Lydia Bosch) whom he ends up marrying in a second marriage and who gives birth to twins. Other important characters are Julio, his best friend, his cousin Alfonso, and also his colleagues at the health center.

The series recounts Dr. Martín's family, personal and professional struggles. He lives with his father and a domestic assistant, Juani (Luisa Martín) and they create the rhythm of his daily family life.

Médico de familia has been one of the few TV series that marked a turning point in Spanish TV fiction and became one of the most followed during its five-year broadcast, together with Cuéntame cómo pasó, Farmacia de guardia, 7 vidas, Los Serrano, Aquí no hay quien viva and Aída.

Starring Emilio Aragón, who made his debut as a television actor in this production, and Lydia Bosch, the series ran on Telecinco between 1995 and 1999.

RAI 1, part of the Italian national public broadcasting company RAI (Radiotelevisione italiana S.p.A.), made a successful adaptation of the series entitled Un medico in famiglia, airing since 1998.

According to El Mundo (1), the secret of Médico de familia was not to please everyone, but not to displease anyone. The series strategically represented the affluent middle class (Nacho, Alicia), the working class (Poli, Juani, Marcial), adolescents, children and the elderly.

== Plot ==
The series tells the story of Nacho Martín, a doctor, widower and father of three children (Maria, Cechu and Anita) and his nephew (Alberto), who lives with him and Nacho's father, Mr. Manolo, the grandfather. Dr. Martín is in love with his sister-in-law (Alicia) with whom he will end up rebuilding his life and having twins (a girl and a boy, Elena and Manuel, who were born in an elevator with Juani and Maria acting as midwives) Other major roles were that of the domestic assistant of Martín's family (Juani) and Nacho's best friend (Julio). Following the departure of Julio, Nacho's cousin Alfonso joins the plot.

== Cast and characters ==
Character	Portrayed by	Seasons								
Character	Portrayed by	1	2	3	4	5	6	7	8	9
Ignacio "Nacho" Martín Villar	Emilio Aragón	Main	Main	Main	Main	Main	Main	Main	Main	Main
Alicia Soller Moreno	Lydia Bosch	Main	Main	Main	Main	Main	Main	Main	Main	Main
Manuel "Manolo" Martin	Pedro Peña	Main	Main	Main	Main	Main	Main	Main	Main	Main
Juana "Juani" Ureña	Luisa Martín	Main	Main	Main	Main	Main	Main	Main	Main	Main
María Martín Soller	Isabel Aboy	Main	Main	Main	Main	Main	Main	Main	Main	Main
Chechu Martín Soller	Aarón Guerrero	Main	Main	Main	Main	Main	Main	Main	Main	Main
Anita Martín Soller	Marieta Bielsa	Main	Main	Main	Main	Main	Main	Main	Main	Main
Gertrudis "Gertru" Yunquera	Lola Baldrich	Main	Main	Main	Main	Main	Main	Main	Main	Main
Hipólito "Poli" Moyano	Antonio Molero	Main	Main	Main	Main	Main	Main	Main	Main	Main
Consuelo Moreno	Gemma Cuervo	Main	Main	Main	Main	Main	Main	Main	Main	Main
Alberto Fernández Martín	Iván Santos	Main	Main	Main	Main	Main	Main	Main	Main	Main
Ruth	Paula Ballesteros	Main	Main	Main	Main	Main	Main	Main	Main	Main
Borja Pradera	José Ángel Egido	Main	Main	Main	Main	Main	Main	Main	Main	Main
Julio Suárez	Francis Lorenzo	Main	Main	Main						
Nicolás Soller	Carlos Ballesteros	Main	Main	Main						
Marcial González	Jorge Roelas	R	Main	Main	Main	Main	Main	Main	Main	Main
Paco Díaz	Jorge Jerónimo	R	R	R	Main	Main	Main	Main	Main	G
Irene Acebal	Ana Duato	G	Main	Main	Main					
Matías Poyo	Luis Barbero	G	R	G	R	Main	Main	Main	Main	Main
Inma	Isabel Serrano			Main	Main	Main	Main	Main	Main	Main
Alfonso Martín	Antonio Valero				Main	Main	Main	Main	Main	Main
Marta Sena	Mónica Aragón					Main	Main	Main	Main	Main
Ernesto	Alberto Domínguez-Sol					R	Main	Main	Main	Main
Ángel Valverde	Jordi Rebellón						G	Main	Main	R

== Episodes ==
Season	Episodes	Originally released		Avg. viewers (millions)	Avg. share
Season	Episodes	First released	Last released	Avg. viewers (millions)	Avg. share
1	14	15 September 1995	12 December 1995	7.429	41.4%
2	13	5 March 1996	4 June 1996	8.061	46.6%
3	13	1 October 1996	24 December 1996	7.559	43.6%
4	13	1 April 1997	24 June 1997	7.471	43.5%
5	14	23 September 1997	23 December 1997	8.871	49.4%
6	12	14 April 1998	30 June 1998	8.239	46.6%
7	14	15 September 1998	15 December 1998	7.427	40.9%
8	13	13 April 1999	6 July 1999	6.515	39.7%
9	13	21 September 1999	21 December 1999	6.834	39.8%

== Awards and nominations ==
=== 1995 ===
- TP Gold Award
  - Best National Series
  - Best Actor (Emilio Aragón)
  - Nominated for Best Actress (Lydia Bosch)

=== 1996 ===
- Waves Television Award
- TP Gold Award
  - Best National Series
  - Best Actor (Emilio Aragón)
  - Nominated for Best Actress (Lydia Bosch and Luisa Martín)
- Television Viewers' and Radio Listeners' Award
- Best Actress Award (Luisa Martín) at the 37th Ibero-American Film and Television Festival.
- Silver Frames:
  - Nominated for Best Actor (Emilio Aragón)
  - Nominated for Best Actress (Lydia Bosch)
- Actors' Union
  - Nominated for Best Supporting Actress (Luisa Martín).

=== 1997 ===
- TP Gold Award
  - Best National Series
  - Best Actor (Emilio Aragón)
  - Nominated for Best Actress (Lydia Bosch and Luisa Martín)
- Silver Frames Award
  - Best actress, TV (Ana Duato).
  - Nominated for Best Actor, TV (Emilio Aragón)
- Actors' Union Award
  - Best Guest Actor (Antonio Molero).
  - Best Supporting Actress (Luisa Martín).
  - Nominated for Best Actor (Jorge Roelas)
  - Nominated for Best Actress (Lola Baldrich)
- Channel-Hopping Award for Best Series.
- Gecko Award:
  - Most watched program on Telecinco.
  - Most watched National Series.
  - Most watched Program for the 1996-1997 Season.
- World Peace Award for the Dissemination of the Values of Peace, Solidarity, and Humanity.
- Award of the National Association of Graphic Press Journalists for the Best TV Series of the Year.

=== 1998 ===
- TP Gold Award
  - Best National Series
  - Best Actress (Lydia Bosch)
  - Nominated for Best Actor (Emilio Aragón)
- Silver Frames:
  - Best Actress (Lydia Bosch)
  - Nominated for Best Actor (Emilio Aragón)
- Nominated for the Actors' Union Award: Best Supporting Actor (Antonio Molero)
- Channel-Hopping Award for Best Series.
- Golden Antenna.
- Golden Heart Award
- Interrogation Award 1998 (by the Downs Syndrome Association of Pontevedra).
- Change 16 Award for Best Actor (Emilio Aragón).
- Gecko Award:
  - Most watched program on Telecinco.
  - Most watched National Series.
  - Most watched Program for the 1997-1998 Season

=== 1999 ===
- TP Gold Award
  - Best Actress (Lydia Bosch)
  - Nominated for Best Actor (Emilio Aragón)
  - Nominated for Best Supporting Actress (Luisa Martín).
  - Nominated for Best National Series
- Channel-Hopping Award for Best Series.
- Image of the Year Prize for Pedro Peña, Luis Barbero and Gemma Cuervo.
- Nominated for the Actors' Union Award: Best Guest Actress (Inmaculada Machado)

== Trivia ==
=== Storylines ===
- Actors took part in two different recordings of the episode of Nacho and Alicia's wedding: one was a happy ending, and a different one portrayed Alicia leaving Nacho on the altar. In the end they decided to go for the wedding.
- Irene's move to Almería and Gertrude's to Tanzania were because, in both cases, the actresses were pregnant in real life and were temporarily unable to appear in the series.
- In the first season (Autumn 1995), the character of Paco, who is a "colchonero" (supporter of the Atletico Madrid football team), was sure in his gut that Atletico Madrid would win in the Spanish League. Time proved him correct and the team were the league champions that season (1995-1996).
- Nurses complained about the image that Gertru presented at the beginning of the series, and the writers ended up making some changes to the way she dressed.
- The characters of grandfather Nicolás (Carlos Ballesteros) and Julio (Francis Lorenzo), despite being fixed - Julio disappears without being mentioned again, except in the first episode after his move, revealing that he had gone to Mexico; and Nicholas is only mentioned by his ex-wife, revealing that he followed his lover to Brazil in response to a question asked by his daughter Alicia. Apart from this he was never mentioned again.

=== Star Appearances ===
Many famous people appeared on the show playing themselves.

- Singers: Montserrat Caballé, Montserrat Martí, Celia Cruz, Ricky Martin, Britney Spears
- Athletes: Julen Guerrero, Yago Lamela, Achille Emana.
- Presenters: Pepe Navarro, Belinda Washington, Chapis, Maria Teresa Campos, Iñaki Gabilondo, Fernando Ónega, Àngels Barceló, Antonio Lobato
- Others: Miliki, Irasema Rita, Judit Mascó

=== Actors ===
- Although Luisa Martín played an Andalusian, she is not one in reality, and faked her accent.
- Médico de familia was the first Spanish series to have an actor with Down syndrome, Alberto Domínguez-Sol (Ernesto), in a recurring role.
- Paula Ballesteros (Ruth) is the sister of fellow actress Elena Ballesteros, whom she accompanied to the casting of Médico de familia. Elena was about to be cast in the role of Mary, that eventually went to Isabel Aboy.
- Jordi Rebellón (Ángel), well known for the role of Vilches on Hospital Central, played a similar role, of the doctor "Borde", on the last season of Médico de Familia.
- Among the actors with recurring roles who appeared on the series for one or more episodes, the following stand out: Marcial Álvarez, Carmen Arévalo, Tito Augusto, Asunción Balaguer, Alicia Borrachero, María Casal, Silvia Casanova, Paloma Cela, Fernando Chinarro, Luis Ciges, Manolo Codeso, Juanjo Cucalón, Silvia Espigado, Cesáreo Estébanez, Bernabé Fernández, Raúl Fraire, Ana Frau, Paca Gabaldón, Christian Gálvez, Ginés García Millán, Paloma Gómez, Vicente Haro, Carlos Hipólito, Antonio Hortelano, Vicky Lagos, Ramón Langa, Chete Lera, Emilio Linder, Paco Luque, Mario Martín, Álvaro Monje, Rubén Ochandiano, Guillermo Ortega, Miguel Ortiz, Blanca Portillo, Marisol Rolandi, Jesús Ruyman, Mar Saura, Janfri Topera, Antonio de la Torre, Santiago Urrialde, Maru Valdivieso, Tina Sáinz, Raquel Meroño, and Mario Martin.
- Although Nacho's wife had already died at the beginning of the series, the actress Marta Molina played this role (Elena) in the scenes showing an old family video and she also posed for the wedding photos with Nacho that appear in the title sequence.
- The baby Macarena Bielsa, sister of Marieta (Anita), appeared in the episode "Nivel dos" (level two) as Julio's niece.
- Luisa Martín appeared in an episode as Juani's Catalan cousin who meets with Nacho in a hotel at the wedding of a friend in Barcelona. This cousin reveals that Juani's full name is Juana Tomasa.
- Various pairs of twins played Manu and Elena, the children of Nacho and Alicia, in the seasons in which they appeared.

=== Sets ===
- The places where most scenes in the series were shot were the house of the Martins. and the Ballesol Health Center. Alicia's house was a regular location since she married Nacho. Other locations that appeared regularly throughout the series were: Gertru's house (that she shared with Óscar, Tente, Irene, and Marta), Marcial's house (that she shared with Poli and later with Matías), the radio broadcasting station of Alfa Radio and other places where Alicia worked (primarily a newspaper and, later, a television channel), the photography shop El Carrete Veloz, Juani and Poli's house, and the Alabama Cafeteria. Also appearing were the house of Consuelo and Nicolás, Irene's house in the first season, and the children's college, and they shot many of the exterior scenes around when Nacho worked in the Mobile UVI.
- On the other hand, the house of Julio and Alfonso was never seen.
- Inma's house appeared on one occasion, when she had a date with Julio on the sixth episode of the third season.
- An episode of the series was filmed in Port Aventura, and another in New York. Both corresponded to trips that the protagonists took to these places.

=== Links to other series ===
- In the final episode of the first season, Nacho tells Gertru that a patient is going to get medicine at the pharmacy of Lourdes Cano. Weeks later, Emilio Aragón appeared in the final episode of Farmacia de Guardia playing Nacho.
- In another episode, Alicia goes to get a drink in the same bar that appears in the series Más Que Amigos (More than Friends), where much of its cast appears. Much later, Alicia appears on an episode of that series.
- The character of Clara Nadal, appeared later on Periodistas (Journalists). The actress who played her daughter Emma on that series, Nadia Henche, did the same on an episode of Médico de familia.
- On various occasions on the final seasons some characters on the series could be seen reading the fictitious newspaper Crónica Universal (Universal Chronicle), the creation of which was the focus of another series on Telecinco, Periodistas (Journalists).
- Pedro Peña (Manolo) and Luis Barbero (Matías) appeared on an episode of the television series Periodistas in December 1998 ("Noticia") playing their characters from Médico de familia.
- In the final episode of the season of Periodistas that preceded the premiere of a new season of Médico de Familia, Laura Maseras (Amparo Larrañaga) ends by telling her team: "Well, let's go, we have an airplane accident to cover" - an allusion to the finale of the previous season of Médico de Familia, that concluded with the accident of the airplane on which Nacho and Alicia were and whose fates had been left unknown.

=== Collaborations by the actors in other works ===
- Before Médico de familia, Emilio Aragón (Nacho) and Lydia Bosch (Alicia) had co-presented El Gran Juego de la Oca (The Great Game of the Goose) on Antena 3 for the 1993–1994 season and appeared together on the program Un, dos, tres... responda otra vez (One, Two, Three... recall another time) in 1984 where she was the host and he was an invited artist. It was in the program dedicated to the circus, the first in the fourth part.
- Antonio Molero (Poli) and Mariola Fuentes (Raquel) were two of the protagonists of the series El grupo (The Group) in 2000.
- Francis Lorenzo (Julio) and Lola Baldrich (Gertru) returned at the same time to the series Compañeros (Companions) between 2001 and 2002.
- Luisa Martín (Juani) and Isabel Aboy (María) worked together on stage in La Obra Historia de una Vida (The story of a life's work) (2004).
- Lola Baldrich (Gertru) and Jorge Roelas (Marcial) had worked together in the program Los irrepetibles (The unrepeatable) featuring Emilio Aragón from La Sexta (The Sixth).
- Lydia Bosch (Alicia) appeared together with Antonio Molero (Poli) in the last season of Los Serrano (The Serranos) (2008). Antonio Molero also recorded a scene with Paula Ballesteros (Ruth) who made a cameo as an employee of a tattoo shop in the episode "El jamón maltés (The Maltese ham)", in 2007.
- Francis Lorenzo (Julio) and Jorge Roelas (Marcial) collaborated on the movie Gran Slalom (1995).
- Isabel Serrano (Inma), Antonio Valero (Alfonso), and Ana Duato (Irene) worked together in La vuelta del coyote (The Return of the coyote) (1998).
- Iván Santos (Alberto) and Isabel Serrano (Inma) collaborated on the Geminis series, Vengaza de Amor (Revenge of love).
- Ana Duato (Irene) and Antonio Valero (Alfonso) collaborated on the series Cuéntame cómo pasó (Tell me how it happened).
- In the second season of Águila Roja (Red Eagle), Francis Lorenzo (Julio) and José Ángel Egido (Borja) crossed paths. Francis Lorenzo, Lydia Bosch (Alicia) and José Ángel Egido also crossed paths during several episodes in the second part of the third season of the series.
- Antonio Molero (Poli) and Luisa Martín (Juani) appeared together in the series 4 Estrellas (4 Stars), also playing the role of a married couple during the first season. Antonio Molero also crossed paths with Francis Lorenzo (Julio) during the second season.

=== References to the series ===
- The airing of the series coincided with the TV3 program "Malalts de Tele" (Sick of TV); when the episodes of the series ended, a large share of the viewers switched channels to TV3. Conscious of this fact, the presenters greeted viewers saying "Benvinguts espectadors de medico de familia, els malalts no van al medico" (Welcome, viewers of Family Doctor, the sick do not go to the doctor).
- One year after Médico de Familia had ended, Antonio Molero appeared in an episode of Periodistas playing the same role. The characters wondered who he was, and someone said "He is from Médico de familia". Then, the grant holder, Berta, played by Isabel Aboy (who had played María on Médico de Familia) asked "What series is this? I have never seen it". This breaks down the shared universe between Médico de Familia and Periodistas that had created the character of Clara Nadal (Belén Rueda) who appeared in both.
- In an episode of 7 vidas, the series was mentioned, as was the episode in which Alicia has twins. In the same episode, Lydia Bosch appeared playing the same character.
