= Reinas de Belleza del Paraguay 2019 =

- Date: August 7, 2019
- Presenters: Chiche Corte; María José Peralta
- Venue: Resort Yacht y Golf Club Paraguayo, Asunción, Paraguay
- Broadcaster: Unicanal
- Entrants: 16
- Winner: MU: Ketlin Lottermann; MW: Araceli Bobadilla; MI: Elida Lezcano; ME: Jociani Repossi
- Congeniality: Cayetana Ayala
- Photogenic: Romina Godoy

The Reinas de Belleza del Paraguay 2019 pageant was held at the Resort Yacht y Golf Club Paraguayo on August 7, 2019, to select Paraguayan representatives to major beauty pageants: Miss Universe, Miss World, Miss International, Miss Earth, among others. It was broadcast live on Unicanal.
There will be two groups of candidates: Miss Universe/Earth candidates; and Miss World/International candidates.

== Results ==
=== Placements ===
Placement	Contestant
Miss Universe Paraguay 2019	Alto Paraná – Ketlin Lottermann
Miss World Paraguay 2019	Asunción – Araceli Bobadilla
Miss International Paraguay 2019	Central – Elida Lezcano
Miss Earth Paraguay 2019	Alto Paraná – Jociani Repossi
Miss Panamericana Internacional Paraguay 2019	Concepción – Neida Noguera
1st Runner-Up	Concepción – Clara Lugo
2nd Runner-Up	Itapúa – Romina Godoy

== Special awards ==
- Miss Silhouette: Jazmín Saucedo
- Miss Amaszonas: Ketlin Lottermann
- Miss Photogenic: Romina Godoy
- Miss Elegance: Juany Ortega
- Miss Talent: Araceli Bobadilla
- Miss Top Model: Cayetana Ayala

== Contestants ==
There are 16 official contestants.

Department/City	Candidate
Asunción	Araceli Bobadilla
Cordillera	María Belén Vargas
Guairá	Camila Herrera
Concepción	Clara Lugo
Amambay	Cynthia Talavera
Central	Elida Lezcano
Cordillera	Gracia Presentado
Asunción	Jazmín Saucedo
Itapúa	Romina Godoy
Itapúa	Rita Fraulob
Concepción	Neida Noguera
Amambay	Luana Ferreira
San Pedro	Cayetana Ayala
Alto Paraná	Ketlin Lottermann
Horqueta	Juana Orterga
Alto Paraná	Jociani Repossi

== Judges ==
The judges for the final telecast include:

- Wilson Núñez
- Matheus Gamba
- Vivian Benítez
- Bettina Barboza de Ray
- Coral Ruiz Reyes
- Marcos Margraf
- Nelson Verá y Aragón
- César Fretes Dávalos

== See also ==
- Miss Paraguay
- Miss Universe 2019
- Miss World 2019
- Miss International 2019
- Miss Earth 2019
