= Luisa Martín =

Spanish actress

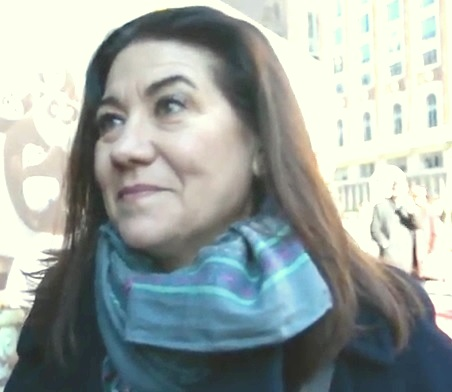
- Martín in 2016
- Born: María Luisa Martín López; 23 February 1960 (age 65); Madrid, Spain
- Occupation: Actress
- Spouse: Joan Llaneras (separated)
- Children: 1

María Luisa Martín López (born in Madrid on 23 February 1960) is a Spanish actress.

== Professional career ==
Martín still preserves a photograph that her father José Luis took of her when she was four years old, in which he wrote: "Mi cómica hija María Luisa tienes madera de actriz, ¿pero será bueno eso para ti?" ("My funny daughter María Luisa, you have the material of an actress, but will this be good for you?".

Years later, when she was seventeen years old and decided that she wanted to be an actress, her father influenced her in that decision and continued to influence her when she entered the Real Escuela Superior de Arte Dramático in Madrid from where she graduated in 1980.

Later she joined the William Layton's Workshop in the National School of Classical Theatre. She began her professional career in theater with the company Teatro estudio 80.

During the 1980s she cut her teeth on stage with plays like The travels of Pedro the lucky, The scandals of a village, The balconies of Madrid, Phaedra, The rhinoceros, and Can't Pay? Won't Pay!.

Her television debut was in 1990 in Teresa Rabal's program La guardería. Later, she would appear in other shows like Noche Noche with Emilio Aragón, The Pedro Ruiz Show, and Un, dos, tres... responda otra vez, where she played different characters every week.

Her first successful television role was in 1993 with the character of la Chirla, the young apprentice to the fishmonger in ¿Quién da la vez? a series created by Vicente Escrivá .

However it was only in 1995 when she became a household name as a result of her involvement in the series Médico de familia where she played the role of domestic assistant Juani Ureña, a role for which she won the Actors' Guild Award for Best Actress in 1996 and the Best Actress Award at the 1997 International Festival of Cinema and Television in Cartagena de Indias.

After this break in television in 1999 she embarked on a successful theatrical project alongside the actor Juan Echanove, of Luis García Berlanga and Rafael Azcona's Not on Your Life. Her performance in the role of "Carmen" won her the SGAE Miguel Mihura Award, the Ercilla Theatre Award, and the Silver Screen Award; and a nomination for the Max Award; in 2000.

In this same year 2000 she made her cinematic debut in the film Terca Vida by Fernando Huertas. Later, in 2004, she would film José Luis Garci's Tiovivo c. 1950, and in 2006, Emilio Martínez Lázaro's Las 13 rosas.

In 2003 together with her production partner Albert Bori she started the theatrical company Art Media Producciones with whom she produced her own shows after her divorce from Joan Llaneras. One of them was Historia de una vida [2004), where she was reunited with her Médico de familia co-star Isabel Aboy.

In 2007 she returned to the stage with the work Like bees trapped in honey, and starred the television series Desaparecida ('Missing').

In 2008 she returned to the television with the 2-part miniseries Wanninkhof Case, in which she played the part of Dolores Vázquez. The cast included Juanjo Puigcorbé, Frank Feys and Belén Constenla, In 2010 she joined the new production of Gran Reserva on Televisión Española in which she played a police officer.

On 27 and 28 December 2011, Telecinco released two episodes on the life of Rocío Dúrcal, with the title of Rocío Dúrcal, volver a verte. she played the part of Rocío's mother, María Ortiz.

In September 2013, she announced her signing by the series B&B, de boca en boca on the Telecinco network, and after that series ended, she signed on for Frágiles on the same network, that premiered in 2013.

== Personal life ==
Martín has collaborated with the organisation Doctors Without Borders since 1986, and has traveled with them to Kenya, Ecuador, and Kosovo, among other places, and collaborated in diverse activities of the organisation in her home country.

She is separated from the actor Joan Llaneras and is in a relationship with Albert Bori. They have a son.

== Filmography ==
=== Film ===
- Terca vida (2000), by Fernando Huertas.
- El sueño de la maestra (2002), by Luis García Berlanga.
- Tiovivo c. 1950 (2004), by José Luis Garci.
- Pactum (2006), by Juan Padrón.
- Las 13 rosas (2007), by Emilio Martínez Lázaro.
- Entrelobos (2010), by Gerardo Olivares.
- Matar el tiempo (2015), by Antonio Hernández.

=== Television ===
==== Main roles ====
- La guardería (1990)
- Noche, noche (1993)
- Un, dos, tres... responda otra vez (1993–1994).
- Quién da la vez (1995) as Chirla
- Médico de familia (1995–1999) as Juana "Juani" Ureña
- La sopa boba (2004) as Carmen
- El club de Flo (2006)
- Desaparecida (2007) as Lola Álvarez
- Wanninkhof case (2008) as Dolores Vázquez
- Gran Reserva (2010–2013) as Agent Isabel Ortega
- Frágiles (2012 -2013) as Luisa
- B&B, de Boca en Boca (2014–2015) as Carmen Sánchez
- Yo quisiera (2015–2016) as Soledad "Sol"
- Bajo sospecha (2016) as Lidia Abad
- Servir y proteger (2017–present) as Claudia Miralles Rodríguez

==== Guest Roles ====
- Las chicas de hoy en día (1991)
- Farmacia de Guardia (1991)
- Más que amigos (1997)
- Periodistas (1998)
- El club de la comedia
- Hospital Central (2006)
- Los misterios de Laura (2014)

=== Theatre ===
- El señor de Pigmalion, by Jacinto Grau.
- Entremet, by Miguel de Cervantes.
- La carátula, by Lope de Vega.
- Los viajes de Pedro el Afortunado, by A. Strindberg.
- El gran circo de los cinco continentes, by collective creation.
- Los escándalos de un pueblo, by Carlo Goldoni.
- Las picardías scapin, by Molière.
- Ha llegado el bululu, an adaptation of the classic text by Cervantes, Lope de Vega.
- Phaedra, by Euripides.
- Los balcones de Madrid, by Tirso de Molina.
- El emperador de China, by George Rivemon-Desaignes.
- Las cartas de una religiosa portuguesa, attributed to Racine.
- La cueva de Salamanca y el viejo celoso, by Miguel de Cervantes.
- Anacleto se divorcia, by Muñoz Seca.
- El retablo jovial, by Alejandro Casona.
- Can't Pay? Won't Pay!, by Darío Fo.
- Rhinoceros, by Eugène Ionesco.
- El pisito clandestino, by A. Martínez Ballesteros.
- El marinero, by Fernando Pessoa.
- La malcasada (musical version) by Lope de Vega.
- Not on Your Life (2000), by Luís García Berlanga and Rafael Azcona.
- Abre el ojo (2002), by Rojas Zorrilla.
- Historia de una vida (2006), by Donald Margulies.
- Como abejas atrapadas en la miel (2007) by Douglas Carter Beane.
- Death and the Maiden (2009) by Ariel Dorfman.
- Time and the Conways (2011) by J.B. Priestley.
- El Show de Kafka (2012) Academic Book Report Version by Franz Kafka.
- El arte de la entrevista by Juan Mayorga.
- En el oscuro corazón del bosque (2016), by José Luis Alonso de Santos.

== Awards ==
=== Goya Awards ===
Year	Category	Film	Result
2000	Best New Actress	Terca Vida	Nominated

=== Actors Guild Awards ===
Year	Category	Film	Result
2007	Best Actress in a Lead Role, Television	Desaparecida	Won
1997	Best Actress in a Supporting Role, Television	Médico de familia	Won
1996	Best Actress in a Supporting Role, Television	Médico de familia	Nominated

=== ATV Awards ===
Year	Category	Series	Result
2008	Best Actress in a TV Series	Desaparecida Wanninkhof Case	Nominated

=== TP Awards ===
Year	Category	Film	Result
1999	Best Actress	Médico de familia	Nominated
1997	Best Actress	Médico de familia	Nominated
1996	Best Actress	Médico de familia	Nominated

=== Silver Screen Awards ===
Year	Category	Film	Resulted
2000	Silver Screen Award for Best Actress, Theater	Not on Your Life	Won
1999	Best Actress, television	Médico de familia	Nominated

=== Islantilla Film and Television Festival ===
Year	Category	Film	Result
2007	Gold Chameleon Award for Best Spanish Actress, Television Fiction	Desaparecida	Won

=== Other prizes ===
- 1997:
  - Gold Catalina Award for Best Actress in an Ensemble Cast for Médico de familia at the International Festival of Film and Television in Cartagena de Indias.
- 1999:
  - ATECA (Association of TV Viewers of Andalusia) Award for Best TV Actress for Médico de familia.
- 2000:
  - Miguel Míhura Award for Best Theater Actress by the Sociedad General de Autores y Editores for Not on Your Life.
  - Ercilla Award for Best Female Performance in Theater for Not on Your Life.
  - Award by the City Council of Pozuelo de Alarcón for Best Female Performance for Not on Your Life.
  - Cadena COPE Award for Theater for Not on Your Life.
- 2009:
  - 49th New York International Festival. Bronze Medal for Best Actress for Desaparecida.
  - Rojas Teatro Award for Best Female Performance for Death and the Maiden.
