= Desaparecida =

Spanish television series

- Genre: Drama; Mystery
- Directed by: Carlos Sedes; Manuel Palacios; Jorge Sánchez Cabezudo; José María Caro
- Starring: Beatriz Ayuso; Carlos Hipólito; Luisa Martín; Francesc Tormos; Bárbara Meier; Miguel Ángel Solá; Marina Salas; Carlos Kaniowsky; Santi Marín; Esther Ortega
- Country of origin: Spain
- Original language: Spanish
- No. of seasons: 1
- No. of episodes: 13

Production
- Executive producers: Miguel Ángel Bernardeau; Ramón Campos
- Production company: Grupo Ganga

Original release
- Network: La 1
- Release: 3 October 2007 – 28 January 2008

Related
- UCO

Desaparecida (lit. 'Missing') is a Spanish drama television series produced by Grupo Ganga for TVE. It originally aired on La 1 from 2007 to 2008.

== Premise ==
Patricia Marcos (Beatriz Ayuso), a young woman from Blancaró (a fictional village close to Madrid) about to have her 18th birthday, disappears after asking her parents for allowance to go the neighbouring village's festival. Patricia's parents, Lola (Luisa Martín) and Alfredo (Carlos Hipólito), face the disappearance of their daughter. Lieutenant Bruno Sierra (Miguel Ángel Solá), an officer from the Central Operative Unit (UCO) is charged with leading the investigation of the whereabouts of Patricia.

== Cast ==
- Beatriz Ayuso as Patricia Marcos.
- Carlos Hipólito as Alfredo Marcos, Patricia's father.
- Luisa Martín as Lola Álvarez, Patricia's mother.
- Francesc Tormos as Diego Marcos, Patricia's older brother.
- Bárbara Meier as Sonia Marcos, Patricia's younger sister.
- Marina Salas as Cristina, the cousin.
- Carlos Kaniowsky as Gerardo, the uncle.
- Santi Marín as Rubén, the boyfriend.
- Miguel Ángel Solá as Lieutenant Sierra.
- Esther Ortega as Laura, UCO sergeant.
- Alejandro Cano as Richi.
- Julio Cabañas as Chete.
- Marina Ballesteros as Carla.
- Héctor Claramunt as César.
- Luisa Martínez as Rosa.

== Production and release ==
Produced by Grupo Ganga for TVE, it consisted of 13 episodes. It began airing on La 1 on 3 October 2007. The original broadcasting run ended on 29 January 2008. Desaparecida sparked a spin-off, UCO, Unidad Central Operativa.

The series and its spin-off UCO were collectively rebranded in Argentina as Bruno Sierra, el rostro de la ley for broadcasting on Canal 7 in 2009.
