= Hypnos (film) =

- Theatrical release poster
- Spanish: Hipnos
- Directed by: David Carreras
- Screenplay by: J.M. Ruiz Córdoba; David Carreras
- Based on: Hipnos by Javier Azpeitia
- Starring: Cristina Brondo; Demián Bichir; Féodor Atkine; Natalia Sánchez
- Cinematography: Xavi Giménez
- Edited by: Frank Gutiérrez
- Music by: Óscar Maceda
- Production company: DeAPlaneta PC
- Distributed by: United International Pictures
- Release date: 8 October 2004
- Country: Spain
- Language: Spanish

Hypnos (Spanish: Hipnos) is a 2004 Spanish horror film directed by David Carreras in his directorial debut, and starring Cristina Brondo, Demián Bichir, Féodor Atkine and Natalia Sánchez.

== Plot ==
Set in a hi-tech psychiatric institution, the plot follows Beatriz Vargas, a young psychiatrist specialised in hypnosis who pits herself into the brink of madness upon trying to help a traumatised girl.

== Cast ==
- Cristina Brondo as Beatriz Vargas
- Demián Bichir as Miguel
- Féodor Atkine as Dr. Sanchez Blanc
- Carlos Lasarte as Dr. Zabala
- Julián Villagrán as Ulloa
- Marisol Membrillo as Elena
- Natalia Sánchez as la Niña

== Production ==
The screenplay by David Carreras Solè and Juan Manuel Ruiz Córdoba adapts the novel Hipnos by Javier Azpeitia. The film is a DeAPlaneta PC production, and it had the participation of TVE, Canal+, and TVE.

== Release ==
Distributed by United International Pictures, the film was theatrically released in Spain on 8 October 2004.

== Reception ==
Casimiro Torreiro of El País assessed that the film "requires patience", as viewers will be rewarded in the last third of the film insofar they do not let themselves "be carried away by primary emotions and remain attentive", despite the "often ridiculous dalliances of Dr. Vargas".

Jonathan Holland of Variety deemed the film to be an "above-average psychodrama with a generally solid script cobbled together from the leftovers of David Fincher and M. Night Shamayalan [sic]".

== See also ==
- List of Spanish films of 2004
