= Jorge Jurado =

Spanish actor

- Born: Jorge Jurado García; Madrid, Spain
- Years active: 2003–present

Jorge Jurado García is a Spanish actor.

== Filmography ==
=== Television ===
- Los Serrano (2003–2008) as Francisco "Curro" Serrano
- Ankawa (2006) as guest role

=== Film ===
- Goal! 2: Living the Dream... (2007) as Enrique
