= Isabel Aboy =

Spanish actress

- Born: Isabel Alejandra Aboy Ferrer; 4 May 1982 (age 44); Madrid, Spain
- Occupations: Actress and psychologist
- Years active: 1995–present
- Spouse: Javier Guimón
- Children: 3

Isabel Alejandra Aboy Ferrer (born 4 May 1982) is a Spanish actress. She became known in 1995, at age 13, following her role in the successful Telecinco series Médico de familia (Family Doctor) playing María, the eldest daughter of character Emilio Aragón, for five years.

== Education and career ==
After a period away from acting, Isabel Aboy signed on to Periodistas in 2001, where she played the scholar, Berta for the last two seasons of the production, also from Telecinco.

Since then, she has devoted herself to her studies in psychology, a career in which she is licensed, as well as small modelling jobs until she got her first chance in theatre. She was in Médico de familia (Family Doctor) in 2004 through the efforts of one of her colleagues, Luisa Martín (remembered from the Juani series). Together they starred in Historia de una vida (Life Story).

In 2007, Elizabeth would again appear on stage and again work along with a fellow actor from Médico de familia Antonio Valero. This time, the work was entitled La mujer que se parecía a Marilyn (The Woman who Looked Like Marilyn).

In March 2007 a report appeared in the Telecinco's El Buscador program about child actors in which she spoke of her experience in Médico de familia. In 2008 she opened in the play Al otro lado del tabique (Across the Wall) at the Teatro Lara in Madrid.

== Personal life ==
She married Javier Guimón in January 2010 and subsequently produced their first child, a daughter.

In 2016 she and her husband had twins.

Currently, she works as a psychologist in the Protégeles foundation, specializing in the section on Internet safety, bullying and eating disorders.

== Career ==
=== Television ===
As an actress

- Médico de familia (1995–1999). Telecinco. As María Martín Soller.
- Periodistas (2001–2002) Telecinco. As Berta Rocha.

As a guest on programs

- Crónicas Marcianas (1999), Telecinco
- Lo + Plus (2001), Canal Plus
- Pasapalabra (2005), Antena 3
- Arucitys (2005), City TV
- El Club (2005), Televisió de Catalunya (TV3)
- Password, Cuatro
- Pasapalabra (2008, 2009), Telecinco
- ¡Qué tiempo tan feliz! (2011), Telecinco

Theatre

- Historia de una vida (2004)
- La mujer que se parecía a Marilyn (2007)
