= Antonio Molero =

Spanish actor (born 1968)

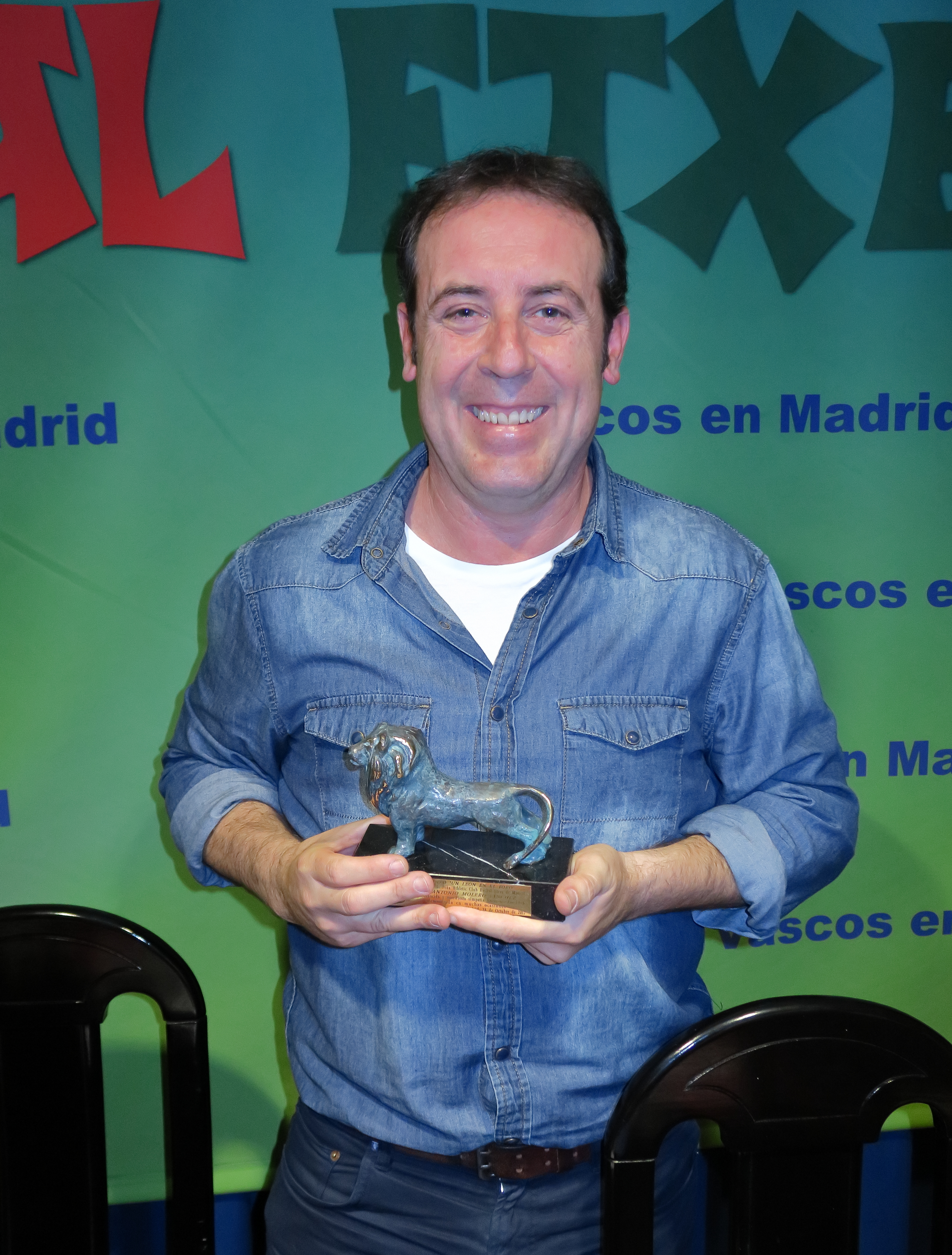
- Born: Antonio Molero Sánchez; 17 January 1968 (age 57); Ajofrín, Spain
- Occupation: Actor

Antonio Molero Sánchez (born 17 January 1968) is a Spanish actor who gained notoriety for his television roles playing Poli in Médico de familia and Fiti in Los Serrano.

== Biography ==
Antonio Molero Sánchez was born on 17 January 1968 in Ajofrín, province of Toledo. He decided to become an actor while studying a degree in teaching. Following small television roles in the 1990s in series such as Los ladrones van a la oficina, and ¡Ay, señor, señor!, he landed the role of Hipólito "Poli" Moyano in Médico de familia, with the character henceforth becoming a key supporting character throughout the nine seasons of the series from 1995 to 1999. He also achieved enormous popularity within the Spanish television audience for his role in Los Serrano from 2003 to 2009, playing Fructuoso "Fiti" Martínez, a mechanic and a regular at the tavern managed by the Serrano family. Later credits include his performances as Mateo Díaz in Águila Roja or as Benito in Amar es para siempre (for nearly 500 episodes).

== Accolades ==
Year	Award	Category	Work	Result	Ref.
2004	13th Actors and Actresses Union Awards	Best Television Actor in a Secondary Role	Los Serrano	Nominated	
2005	14th Actors and Actresses Union Awards	Best Television Actor in a Secondary Role	Los Serrano	Nominated	
