= Esther Arroyo =

Spanish actress and model

- Born: María Esther Julia Arroyo Bermúdez; 29 March 1968 (age 58); Cádiz, Spain
- Spouse: Antonio Navajas
- Modeling information
- Height: 1.75 m (5 ft 9 in)
- Hair color: Blonde

María Esther Julia Arroyo Bermúdez (born Cádiz, 29 March 1968) is a Spanish actress, model and beauty pageant titleholder who was crowned Miss Spain 1990 and represented her country at Miss Universe 1991.

== Trajectory ==
Since winning the Miss Spain contest she appeared in many TV programs as a host (Homo Zapping) and collaborator (Sabor a ti) She also acted in many TV series, her most famous role was playing Ali in Periodistas from 1998 to 2002.

On 10 October 2008 she was involved in a car accident alongside singer Ana Torroja when another car collided with them. Her husband was the driver and she was the copilot. One of her friends died in the said accident and she still has a limp due to this.

In October 2016 she became one of the contestants of musical impersonation show Tu cara me suena in Antena 3.

== Filmography ==
- Atún y chocolate (2004).
- Los increíbles (Spanish dub) (2004).

Won Miss Universe
Won Miss Europe
