= Miss Paraguay =

Beauty pageant

- Type: Women's beauty pageant
- Headquarters: Luque, Paraguay
- Qualifies for: Miss Intercontinental; Reinado Internacional del Café
- First edition: 1915
- Last edition: 2023
- Current titleholder: Milagros Aramí Walther; Alto Paraná
- President: Graciela Venialgo
- Language: Spanish

Miss Paraguay is a national beauty pageant in Paraguay established in 1915. It currently selects Paraguay's representatives for the Miss Intercontinental and Reinado Internacional del Café pageants.

The current Miss Paraguay is Celeste Cibils of Itapúa, who was crowned on December 6, 2025 at the Hotel Guaraní in Asunción.

== History ==
In 1915, Arsenio López Decoud, then president of the Unión Club, organized the first beauty pageant held in Paraguay. The event took place in the spring of that year at the then National Theater—now the Ignacio A. Pane Municipal Theater—and was won by 19-year-old María Anselma Clotilde "Anselmita" Heyn Denis. The pageant was revived in 1957 at the initiative of the government of Alfredo Stroessner, with the support of the Secretariat of Tourism.

In 1970, the contest was organized by Dinam Publicidad and took place in the Presidential Hall of the Hotel Guaraní.

In 1990, Guillermo Rolón assumed leadership of the pageant together with Sistema Nacional de Televisión (SNT). In 2001, the license to send representatives to the Miss Universe competition was relinquished due to the loss of sponsors amid an economic crisis. As a result, Paraguay did not participate in the 2002 and 2003 editions of the competition.

In March 2017, the Chamber of Deputies declared the pageant to be of cultural interest. The editions corresponding to the years 2020 and 2021 were canceled due to the COVID-19 pandemic. Subsequently, in July 2022, the competition was again suspended following the death of Rolón, president of the organization. Since then, the organization has been led by his widow, Graciela Venialgo.

== Titleholders ==
Year	Miss Paraguay	Department
1915	María Anselma Clotilde "Anselmita" Heyn Denis	Asunción
1957	Lucy Montonaro	Caaguazú
1958	Graciela Scorza	Alto Paraguay
1960	Mercedes Ruggia	Asunción
1961	María Cristina Osnaghi	Asunción
1962	Corina Rolón	Alto Paraguay
1963	Amelia Benítez	Central
1964	Miriam Riart Brugada	Asunción
1965	Stella Castell	Gran Chaco
1966	Mirtha Martínez	Alto Paraguay
1967	María Eugenia Torres	Presidente Hayes
1969	Blancanieves Zaldívar	Central
1970	Teresa Mercedes Brítez Süllow	Paraguarí
1971	Marit Tomassone	Misiones
1972	María Stella Volpe Martínez	Central
1973	Teresita María Cano	Concepción
1974	María Ángela Zulema Medina Monjagata	Alto Paraguay
1975	Susana Beatriz Vire Ferreira	Alto Paraná
1976	Nidia Fátima Cardenas	Central
1977	María Leticia Zarza Perriet	Asunción
1978	Rosa María Duarte Melgarejo	Asunción
1979	Patricia Lohman Bernie	Asunción
1980	Celia Noemí Schaerer del Puerto	Asunción
1981	María Isabel Urizar Caras	Cordillera
1984	Elena Ortiz Allegretti	Guairá
1985	Daisy Patricia Ferreira	Asunción
1986	Verónica Angulo Achinelli	Amambay
1987	Tammy Elizabeth Ortigoza Sonneborn	Itapúa
1988	Marta Noemí Acosta Granada	Canindeyú
1989	Ana Victoria Schaerer Del Puerto	Paraguarí
1990	Mónica Plate Cano	Alto Paraguay
1991	Vivian Rosana Benítez Brizuela	Asunción
1992	Pamela Zarza Enríquez	Boquerón
1993	Carolina Barrios	Itapúa
1994	Lilian Noemí González Mena	Presidente Hayes
1995	Bettina Rosmary Barboza Caffarena	Asunción
1996	Martha Lovera Parquét	Asunción
1997	Rossana Elizabeth Jiménez Pereira	Cordillera
1998	Luz Marina González Ruíz	Ñeembucú
1999	Carmen Morínigo Machuca	San Pedro
2000	Carolina Ramírez Franco	Alto Paraná
2001	María Gabriela Riquelme	Asunción
2004	Myriam Rodríguez Insfrán	Misiones
2005	Liz Santacruz Amarilla	Asunción
2009	Viviana Mabel Benítez Duarte	Misiones
2010	Evelyn Catalina Jara Rojas (resigned)	Caaguazú
2010	Luz Adela Alejandro Brizuela (assumed)	Amambay
2011	Clara Silvana Carrillo Gossen	Concepción
2012	Mónica Mariani Pascualotto	Canindeyú
2013	Noelia Díaz Rodríguez	Asunción
2014	Isabel Soloaga Irala	Itapúa
2015	Katri Analía Villamayor Montiel	Alto Paraná
2016	Alma María Monserrat Villagra Miranda	Paraguarí
2017	Yessica Daiana Ledezma	Guairá
2018	Verónica Viveros Viedma	Asunción
2019	Cynthia Verónica Florenciani Agüero	Central
2023	Milagros Aramí Walther	Alto Paraná
2024	Luz María Benítez	Amambay
2026	Celeste Cibils	Itapúa

=== Department rankings ===
Department	Title	Year
Distrito Capital	16	1960, 1961, 1964, 1977, 1978, 1979, 1985, 1987, 1991, 1993, 1995, 1996, 2008, 2013, 2015, 2020
Alto Paraguay	7	1958, 1962, 1966, 1974, 1990, 2004, 2006
Central	6	1963, 1972, 1976, 2009, 2010, 2012
Guairá	4	1984, 2016, 2021, 2022
Cordillera	4	1981, 1997, 2018, 2023
Alto Paraná	3	1975, 2000, 2019
Amambay	3	1986, 2014, 2017
Presidente Hayes	3	1967, 1994, 2011
Boquerón	2	1992, 2007
Paraguarí	2	1970, 1989
Itapúa	1	2005
Caazapá	1	2001
San Pedro	1	1999
Ñeembucú	1	1998
Canindeyú	1	1988
Concepción	1	1973
Misiones	1	1971
Gran Chaco	1	1963
Caaguazú	1	1957

== Representatives to international beauty pageants ==
=== Miss Intercontinental ===
- : Declared as Winner
- : Ended as runner-up
- : Ended as one of the finalists or semifinalists
- : Ended as special awards winner

Year	Department	Miss Intercontinental Paraguay	Placement at Miss Intercontinental	Special Awards	Notes
Miss Paraguay
2023	Alto Paraná	Milagros Aramí Walther	Unplaced		
2022	Did not compete				
Miss Grand Paraguay
2021	Alto Paraná	Fátima Lorena Rodríguez Benítez	Top 20		Rodríguez was appointed by the organization of the Miss Grand Paraguay pageant
2020	Due to the impact of the COVID-19 pandemic, no pageant in 2020				
2019	Distrito Capital	Sol María Violeta Pavón Rolón	Unplaced		
2018	Itapúa	Gabriela Natasha Soley Sawkiw	Top 20	Best in Swimsuit	
2017	Distrito Capital	Jessica Torres Martínez	Unplaced	Best in Evening Gown; Best Body (2nd runner-up)	
Did not compete between 2015–2016
Miss Paraguay
2014	Central	Isabel Soloaga Irala	Unplaced		
2013	Did not compete				
2012	Alto Paraná	Claudia Kohl Grutzmann	Unplaced		
2011	Concepción	Clara Silvana Carrillo Gossen	Unplaced		
2010	Distrito Capital	Maura Rojas Cantero	Top 20		
Did not compete between 2000–2009
1999	—	Marta Concepción Rodríguez Portillo	Unplaced		
1998	Did not compete				
1997	—	Salmi Agüero Esgaib	Unplaced		
1996	—	Claudia Rocío Melgarejo	2nd Runner-up		

=== Reinado Internacional del Café ===
- : Declared as Winner
- : Ended as runner-up
- : Ended as one of the finalists or semifinalists
- : Ended as special awards winner

Year	Department	Reina Internacional del Café Paraguay	Placement at Reinado Internacional del Café	Special Awards
Miss Paraguay
2024	Alto Paraná	Milagros Aramí Walther	Unplaced	
2023	Central	Yanina Isabel Villalba Ortiz	Unplaced	
2022	Ñeembucú	Érika Araceli Jara Muñoz	Unplaced	
2020	Central	Cynthia Verónica Florenciani Agüero	Unplaced	
2019	Distrito Capital	Verónica Viveros Viedma	Unplaced	
2018	Guairá	Yessica Ledezma	Unplaced	
2017	Paraguarí	Alma María Monserrat Villagra Miranda	Unplaced	
2016	Alto Paraná	Katri Analía Villamayor Montiel	Unplaced	
2015	Itapúa	Isabel Soloaga Irala	Unplaced	
2014	Distrito Capital	Noelia Díaz Rodríguez	2nd princess	Best Hair; Queen of the Carabineros (Top 5)
2013	Canindeyú	Mónica Mariani Pascualotto	Unplaced	
2012	Concepción	Clara Silvana Carrillo Gossen	Unplaced	
2011	Distrito Capital	María Belén Alonso Virgili	Unplaced	
2010	Misiones	Viviana Mabel Benítez Duarte	Unplaced	
2009	Distrito Capital	Fiorella Forestieri	Unplaced	
2008	Alto Paraná	Karen Natalia Álvarez	Unplaced	
2007	Did not compete			
2006	—	Daylen Natalia Marcela Vittone Barreto	Unplaced	
2005	—	Adriana María Vachoumard Rodríguez	Unplaced	
2004	Misiones	Myriam Rodríguez Insfrán	Unplaced	
2003	—	Pabla Victoria Thomen Rodríguez	Unplaced	
2002	—	Tania María Ramírez Olmedo	Unplaced	
2001	—	Claudia Violeta Rojas Yegros	Unplaced	
2000	—	Carmen Alicia Moringio Machuca	Unplaced	
1999	Ñeembucú	Luz Marina González Ruiz Díaz	Top 6	
1998	Cordillera	Rossana Elizabeth Jiménez Pereira	Unplaced	
1997	Distrito Capital	Marta Elizabeth Lovera Parquét	Unplaced	
1996	Distrito Capital	Bettina Rosemary Barboza Caffarena	Unplaced	
1995	—	Fabiola Cibils Bittar	Unplaced	
1994	—	María Elicia Escalante Haneman	Unplaced	
1993	—	Genny Margarita Fariña González	Unplaced	
1992	—	Edith Myriam Núñez Espinoza	Unplaced	
1991	—	Elizabeth Rocío Belinda Mongelos Méndez	Unplaced	
1990	—	Emiliana Rodríguez	3rd princess	
1989	—	Liliana Cantero Trujillo	Unplaced	
1988	—	Lidia Isabel Ozuna Riveros	Unplaced	
1987	—	Norma Teresita Gayoso Gómez	Unplaced	
1985	—	María Lucila Noguera Ojeda	Unplaced	
Did not compete between 1977–1984
1976	—	Nidya Fátima Cárdenas	Unplaced	
1975	Alto Paraná	Susana Beatriz Vire Ferreira	1st princess	
1974	—	Elizabeth Brandshab	Unplaced	
1973	—	María Gloria González	Unplaced	
1972	Central	María Stella Volpe Martínez	Reina Internacional del Café 1972	

== See also ==
- Miss Universe
- Miss World
- Miss International
- Miss Earth
- Miss Supranational
- Miss América Latina
- Reina Hispanoamericana
- Reinas del Paraguay
