= Miss Universe 1991 =

40th anniversary of the Miss Universe pageant

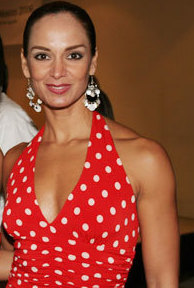
- Lupita Jones, Miss Universe 1991
- Date: May 17, 1991
- Presenters: Dick Clark; Leeza Gibbons; Angela Visser
- Venue: Aladdin Theatre for the Performing Arts, Las Vegas, Nevada, United States
- Broadcaster: CBS; KLAS-TV
- Entrants: 73
- Placements: 10
- Debuts: Bulgaria; Ghana; Romania
- Withdrawals: Aruba; Australia; Austria; Denmark; Egypt; England; Gibraltar; Greenland; Honduras; Portugal; Scotland; Switzerland; Wales
- Returns: Belgium; Brazil; Cook Islands; Curaçao; Lebanon; Luxembourg; Namibia; Nicaragua; Panama; United Kingdom; United States Virgin Islands; Yugoslavia
- Winner: Lupita Jones; Mexico
- Congeniality: Monique Lindesay (United States Virgin Islands)
- Best National Costume: Maribel Gutiérrez (Colombia)
- Photogenic: Siobhan McClafferty (Ireland)

Miss Universe 1991, the 40th anniversary of the Miss Universe pageant, was held at the Aladdin Theatre for the Performing Arts in Las Vegas, Nevada, United States, on May 17, 1991.

At the end of the event, Lupita Jones of Mexico was crowned as Miss Universe 1991 by Mona Grudt of Norway, it was the first victory of Mexico in the pageant. Although they would win later in 2010, 2020 and 2025. Seventy-three contestants competed in this year's edition.

== Results ==
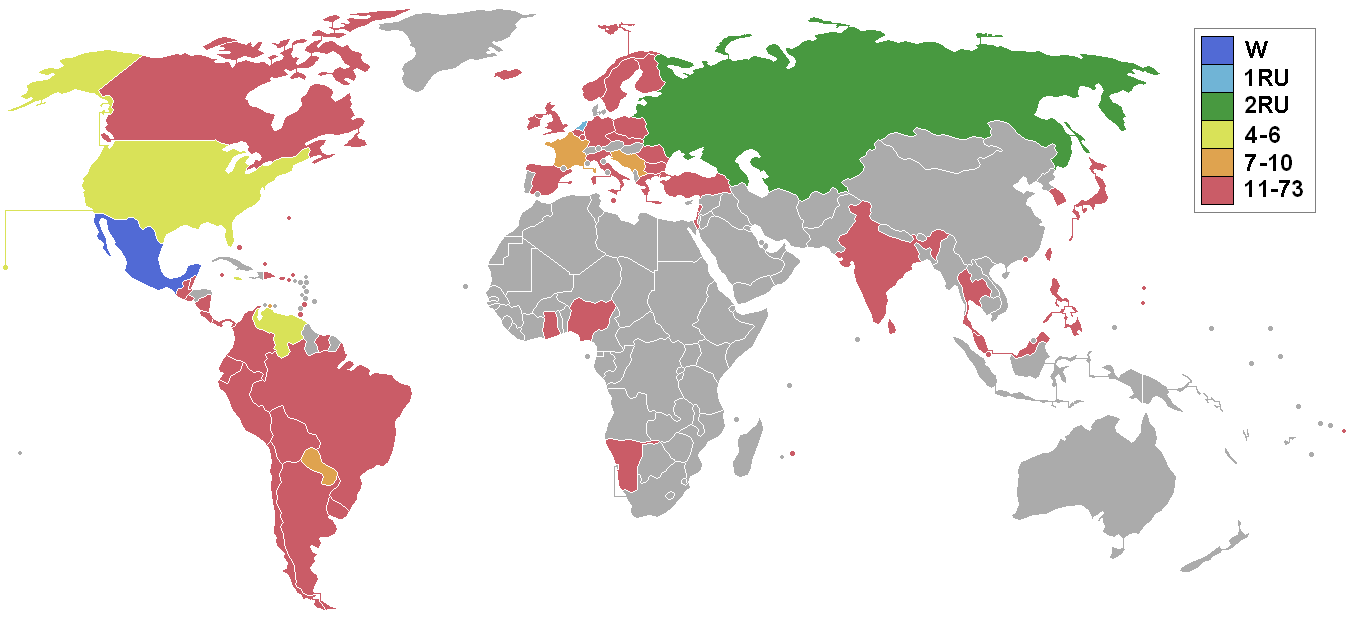
Miss Universe 1991 participating nations and results

=== Placements ===
Placement	Contestant
Miss Universe 1991	Mexico – Lupita Jones
1st Runner-Up	Netherlands – Paulien Huizinga
2nd Runner-Up	Soviet Union – Julia Lemigova
Top 6	Jamaica – Kimberley Mais; United States – Kelli McCarty; Venezuela – Jackeline Rodríguez
Top 10	Curaçao – Jacqueline Krijger; France – Mareva Georges; Paraguay – Vivian Benítez; Yugoslavia – Natasha Pavlovich

=== Final Competition ===
Nation	Preliminary Average	Interview	Swimsuit	Evening Gown	Semifinal Average
Mexico	9.006 (1)	9.608 (1)	9.450 (1)	9.758 (1)	9.605 (1)
Netherlands	8.694 (10)	9.592 (2)	9.073 (6)	9.600 (4)	9.421 (4)
USSR	8.864 (3)	9.550 (3)	9.225 (3)	9.717 (2)	9.497 (3)
Venezuela	8.719 (7)	9.533 (4)	9.412 (2)	9.650 (3)	9.531 (2)
Jamaica	8.986 (2)	9.418 (6)	9.213 (4)	9.542 (7)	9.391 (5)
United States	8.834 (4)	9.425 (5)	8.950 (8)	9.542 (7)	9.305 (6)
Curaçao	8.753 (6)	9.190 (8)	9.135 (5)	9.550 (6)	9.291 (7)
Paraguay	8.719 (7)	9.375 (7)	8.987 (7)	9.350 (10)	9.237 (8)
France	8.706 (9)	9.067 (10)	8.867 (10)	9.590 (5)	9.174 (9)
Yugoslavia	8.774 (5)	9.167 (9)	8.875 (9)	9.442 (9)	9.161 (10)

=== Special awards ===
Awards	Winners
Best National Costume	Colombia – Maribel Gutierrez
Miss Photogenic	Ireland – Siobhan McClafferty
Miss Congeniality	United States Virgin Islands – Monique Lindesay

Order of Announcements

Top 10

1. Jamaica
2. France
3. Yugoslavia
4. Paraguay
5. Curacao
6. USSR
7. Venezuela
8. Netherlands
9. United States
10. Mexico

Top 6

1. Venezuela
2. Netherlands
3. United States
4. Jamaica
5. Mexico
6. USSR

Top 3

1. USSR
2. Netherlands
3. Mexico

== Contestants ==
- Argentina – Verónica Honnorat
- Bahamas – Farrah Fiona Saunders
- Belgium – Katia Alens
- Belize – Josephine Gault
- Bermuda – Andrea Sullivan
- Bolivia – María Selva Landívar
- Brazil – Patricia Franco de Godói
- British Virgin Islands – Anne Lennard
- Bulgaria – Christy Drumeva
- Canada – Leslie McLaren
- Cayman Islands – Bethea Michelle Christian
- Chile – Cecilia del Rosario Alfaro
- Colombia – Maribel Gutiérrez Tinoco
- Cook Islands – Raema Chitty
- Costa Rica – Viviana Múñoz
- Curaçao – Jacqueline Krijger
- Czechoslovakia – Renata Gorecka
- Dominican Republic – Melissa Vargas
- Ecuador – Diana Neira
- El Salvador – Rebecca Dávila
- Finland – Tanja Vienonen
- France – Mareva Georges
- Germany – Katrin Richter
- Ghana – Dela Tamakole
- Greece – Marina Popou
- Guam – Jevon Pellacani
- Guatemala – Lorena Palacios
- Hong Kong – Anita Yuen
- Iceland – Dis Sigurgeirsdóttir
- India – Christabelle Howie
- Ireland – Siobhan McClafferty
- Israel – Miri Goldfarb
- Italy – Maria Biscotti
- Jamaica – Kimberley Mais
- Japan – Atsuko Yamamoto
- Lebanon – Fida Chehayeb
- Luxembourg – Annette Feydt
- Malaysia – Elaine Chew
- Malta – Michelle Zarb
- Mauritius – Dhandevy Jeetun
- Mexico – Lupita Jones
- Namibia – Ronel Liebenberg
- Netherlands – Paulien Huizinga
- Nicaragua – Ana Sofía Pereira
- Nigeria – Tonia Okogbenin
- Northern Mariana Islands – Sharon Rosario
- Norway – Lene Maria Pedersen
- Panama – Liz De León
- Paraguay – Vivian Benítez
- Peru – Eliana Martínez
- Philippines – Maria Lourdes Gonzalez
- Poland – Joanna Michalska
- Puerto Rico – Lissette Bouret
- Republic of China – Lin Shu-Chuan
- Romania – Daniella Nane
- Saint Vincent and the Grenadines – Samantha Robertson
- Singapore – Eileen Yeow
- South Korea – Seo Jung-min
- Soviet Union – Julia Lemigova
- Spain – Esther Arroyo
- Sri Lanka – Diloka Seneviratne
- Suriname – Simone Vos
- Sweden – Susanna Gustafsson
- Thailand – Jiraprapa Sawettanan
- Trinidad and Tobago – Josie Anne Richards
- Turkey – Pinar Ozdemir
- Turks and Caicos Islands – Kathy Hawkins
- United Kingdom – Helen Upton
- United States – Kelli McCarty
- United States Virgin Islands – Monique Lindesay
- Uruguay – Adriana Comas
- Venezuela – Jackeline Rodríguez
- Yugoslavia – Natasha Pavlovich

=== Order of Introduction ===
The following table is the order of introduction in the Parade of Nations segment in the regional groups, randomly-ordered.

Geographical Region / Continent	Order of Country / Territory Introduction
Asia and The USSR	Singapore; Sri Lanka; Malaysia; Republic of China; Thailand; Hong Kong; Soviet Union; Japan; India; South Korea; Philippines
South America	Suriname; Curaçao; Chile; Uruguay; Argentina; Bolivia; Venezuela; Peru; Brazil; Colombia; Paraguay; Ecuador
Europe and The British Isles	Bulgaria; Czechoslovakia; United Kingdom; Poland; Belgium; France; Iceland; Romania; Germany; Netherlands; Luxembourg; Finland; Sweden; Ireland; Norway
Mediterranean, Middle East, and Africa	Nigeria; Lebanon; Namibia; Ghana; Spain; Malta; Israel; Turkey; Greece; Italy; Yugoslavia
The Islands	Dominican Republic; Mauritius; Northern Mariana Islands; Puerto Rico; British Virgin Islands; Cook Islands; Trinidad and Tobago; Saint Vincent and the Grenadines; Cayman Islands; Guam; Bahamas; Bermuda; Jamaica; Turks and Caicos Islands; United States Virgin Islands
Central and North America	Costa Rica; Panama; El Salvador; Belize; Mexico; Nicaragua; Guatemala; Canada; United States

== Notes ==
=== Debuts ===
- Bulgaria
- Ghana
- Romania

=== Returns ===
Last competed in 1952:

- United Kingdom The three constituent countries had their franchises unified, along with other territories that did not have their own franchises, as, between 1955 and 1990, each constituent country on the United Kingdom (England, Scotland and Wales) sent their separated candidate to the pageant. Since 1994, Northern Ireland candidates could compete either in Miss Ireland or in Miss United Kingdom.

Last competed in 1978:

- Nicaragua

Last competed in 1984:

- Namibia competed for the first time as an independent country after gaining independence from South Africa in February 1990.

Last competed in 1985:

- Yugoslavia

Last competed in 1986:

- Cook Islands

Last competed in 1987:

- Panama

Last competed in 1988:

- Lebanon

Last competed in 1989:

- Belgium
- Brazil
- Curaçao
- Luxembourg
- United States Virgin Islands

=== Designations ===
- Venezuela – Jackeline Rodríguez

=== Replacements ===
- Philippines – Maria Lourdes Gonzalez replaced Anjanette Abayari, who was not a Philippine citizen.
- Venezuela – Sharon Luengo – The director of the Miss Venezuela pageant, Osmel Sousa, wanted to send her to Miss Universe due to the delay of the Miss Venezuela 1991 pageant. Still, the Miss Universe Organization rejected her as a contestant due to her 2nd runner-up position at Miss World 1990. Sousa later decided to select the Venezuelan delegate for Miss Universe 1991 under a special commission.
- Soviet Union – The winner of Miss USSR 1990, Maria Kezha, was underage after February 1.
- Yugoslavia – Miss Yugoslavia 1990, Ivona Brnelić decided not to participate in order to be focused in her studies. Her first runner up, Zorica Vasojević, was supposed to go, but was replaced at last minute by Natasha Pavlovic for reasons not clarified.

=== Withdrawals ===
- Aruba – The Miss Aruba 1991 pageant was delayed to May 31. Their 1991 winner, Jerusha Rasmijn, was sent to Miss Universe 1992 instead.
- Australia – Their national pageant was delayed due the Australian Economic Crisis of early 1990s, Their winner, Georgina Denahy, was sent to Miss Universe 1992.
- Austria – Regina Kozak – Lack of sponsorship, went instead to Miss International 1991.
- Denmark – Sharon Givskav – Due to lack of sponsorship and funding. She went to Miss World 1991 instead.
- Egypt – no contest.
- England – Competed as United Kingdom or Great Britain since then.
- Gibraltar – Sarah Yeats – She was underage before February 1.
- Greenland – Bibiane Holm – The Miss Greenland pageant lost their license, and as a result, she went to Miss World 1991 instead.
- Honduras – Claudia Mercedes Caballero – She fell ill and withdrew due to the fact that she suffered from chronic fatigue and had to rest by medical prescription.
- Portugal – Carla Lopes Da Costa Caldeira – unknown
- Scotland – Competed as United Kingdom or Great Britain since then.
- Switzerland – Priscilla Leimgruber – She fell ill and withdrew at the last minute.
- Wales – Competed as United Kingdom or Great Britain since then.

=== Did not compete ===
- Kenya – Aisha Wawira Lieberg – Due to lack of sponsorship and funding. She went to Miss Universe 1992 instead.
- New Zealand – Adele Valerie Kenny – because she was underage before February 1.

=== Name changes ===
- Holland began competing as Netherlands.
- Great Britain began competing as United Kingdom for the first time.
