= Pedro Peña (actor) =

Spanish actor (1929–2014)

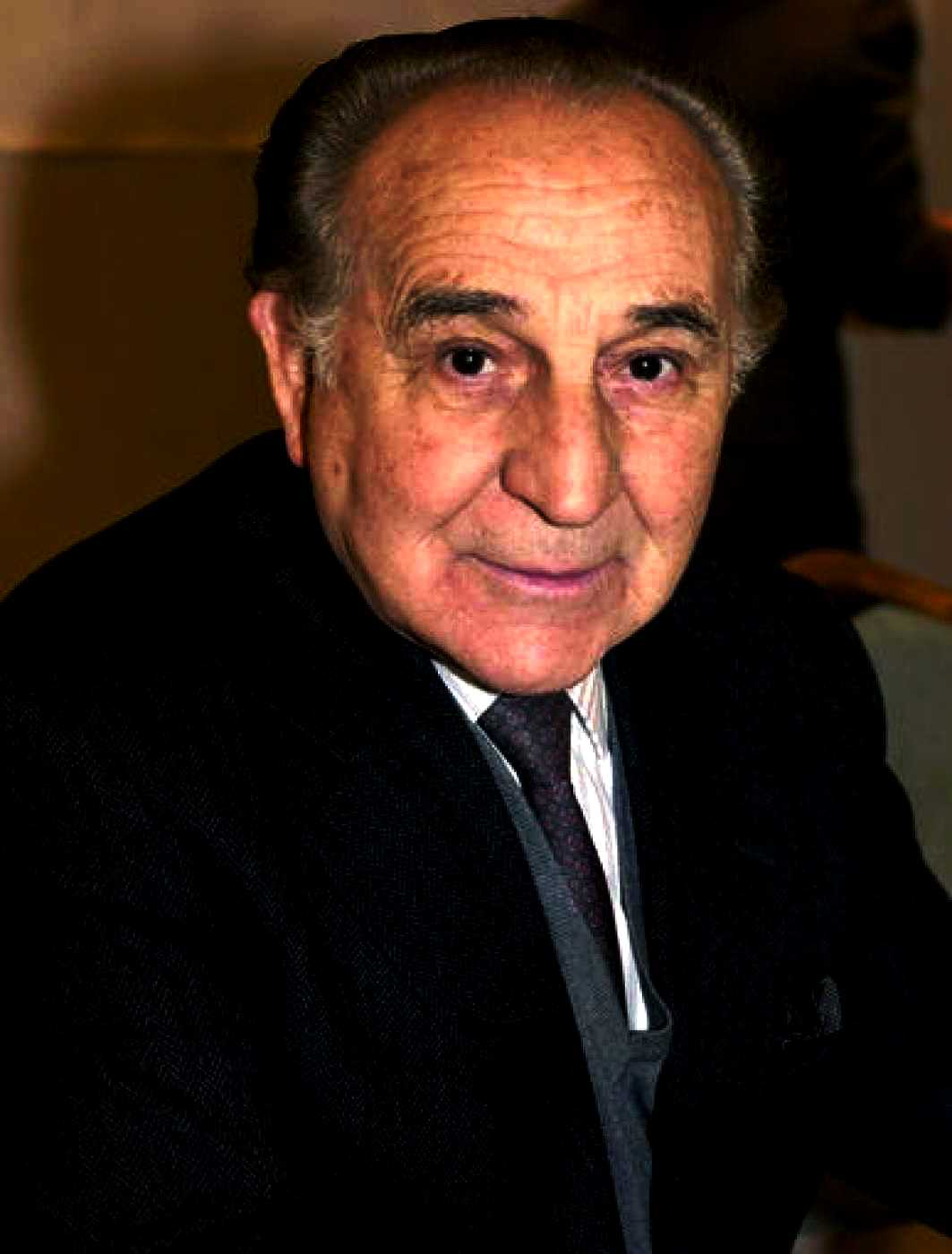
- Born: Pedro Peña Allén; 14 December 1925; Tordehumos, Valladolid, Spain
- Died: 2 October 2014 (aged 88); Madrid, Spain
- Occupation: Actor
- Known for: Médico de familia

Pedro Peña Allén (14 December 1925 – 2 October 2014), was a Spanish actor, best known for his performance as Manuel in the Spanish television series Médico de familia.

== Filmography ==
=== Television ===
Year	Series
1979	Que used lo mate bien
1979-80	Teatro breve
1983	Vaya par de gemelas
1986	Sí al amor
1992	Farmacia de guardia
1994-95	Los ladrones van a la oficina
1995-99	Médico de familia
1998	La isla de la tortuga
1999	Siete vidas
1999	Periodistas
2002-05	Un paso adelante
2009	The Sindone
2009	En la memoria
2010	Los ojos de fuego
2011	Dulce
2013	Aún hay tiempo
