= Miss Paraguay 2009 =

- Date: July 10, 2009
- Presenters: Pablo Rodríguez and Sannie López Garelli
- Venue: Sheraton Asunción
- Broadcaster: Telefuturo
- Entrants: 23
- Winner: Mareike Baumgarten; Central

The Miss Paraguay 2009 was held on July 10, 2009. The pageant was won by Mareike Baumgarten of Asunción. It was broadcast live on Telefuturo from the Sheraton Asunción. The winner represented Paraguay at the Miss Universe 2009 and Reina Hispanoamericana 2009. The winner of Miss Mundo Paraguay, Tamara Sosa will compete in the Miss World 2009. Romina Bogado was chosen as the Miss Internacional Paraguay and will go to the Miss International 2009 pageant. Tamara Sosa also competed at the Miss American Continent Pageant.

== Results ==
Final results	Contestant
Miss Paraguay 2009	Central - Mareike Baumgarten
Miss Mundo Paraguay 2009	Canindeyú - Tamara Sosa
Miss Internacional Paraguay	Presidente Hayes - Romina Bogado
1st Runner-up	Concepción - Carmen Valdivieso
2nd Runner-up	Amambay - Daiana Cubilla
3rd Runner-up	Alto Paraguay - Dahiana Romero
Top 12	Amazonas - Liza Olmedo; Alto Paraná - María Saccarello; Caazapá - Rossana Fretes; Paraguarí - Sheila Caballero; Itapúa - Bernardina Barreto; Misiones - Alejandra Franco

=== Special awards ===
- Miss Congeniality - Rocío Segovia
- Miss Photogenic - Shirley Torres
- Best Face - Mareike Baumgarten

== Delegates ==
Represented	Candidates	Age	Height	Hometown
Alto Paraguay	Dahiana Romero	19	1.75 m (5 ft 9 in)	Ñemby
Alto Paraná	María José Sacarello	20	1.79 m (5 ft 10 1/2 in)	Ciudad del Este
Amambay	Daiana Cubilla Lee	21	1.73 m (5 ft 8 in)	Asunción
Amazonas	Liza Olmedo	20	1.73 m (5 ft 8 in)	Asunción
Asunción	Patricia Pineda	18	1.76 m (5 ft 9 1/2 in)	Asunción
Boquerón	Claudia Figueredo	20	1.73 m (5 ft 8 in)	Asunción
Caaguazú	Shirley Torres	23	1.80 m (5 ft 11 in)	Asunción
Caazapá	Rossana Fretes	21	1.83 m (6 ft 0 in)	Caazapá
Canindeyú	Tamara Sosa	19	1.77 m (5 ft 9 1/2 in)	Asunción
Central	Mareike Baumgarten	22	1.78 m (5 ft 10 in)	San Lorenzo
Concepción	Carmen Valdivieso	20	1.74 m (5 ft 8 1/2 in)	Concepción
Cordillera	Luz María Fernández	23	1.75 m (5 ft 9 in)	Caacupé
Distrito Capital	Andrea Toledo	20	1.77 m (5 ft 9 1/2 in)	Asunción
Gran Chaco	Rocío María Rodríguez	25	1.74 m (5 ft 8 1/2 in)	Asunción
Guairá	Cindy Villalba	20	1.79 m (5 ft 10 1/2 in)	Ciudad del Este
Itapúa	Bernardina Barreto	21	1.80 m (5 ft 11 in)	Capiatá
Misiones	Alejandra Franco	24	1.80 m (5 ft 11 in)	Itá
Ñeembucú	Rocío Segovia	20	1.82 m (5 ft 11 1/2 in)	San Lorenzo
Paraguarí	Sheila Caballero	18	1.72 m (5 ft 7 1/2 in)	Paraguarí
Presidente Hayes	Romina Bogado	21	1.81 m (5 ft 11 1/2 in)	Villa Hayes
San Pedro	Rebeca Fernández	26	1.76 m (5 ft 9 1/2 in)	Asunción
Territorio Occidental	Evelin Cáceres	18	1.76 m (5 ft 9 1/2 in)	Asunción
Territorio Oriental	María Gabriela Romero	18	1.80 m (5 ft 11 in)	Asunción

== Judges ==
The following persons judged the final competition.

- Juan Sadi Padoin
- Dra. Isabel Musi
- Salvador Más
- Sra. Amanda Palumbo
- Sra. Ati Troche
- Sra. Karina Buttner
- Sandra Poletti

== See also ==
- Miss Paraguay
- Paraguay at major beauty pageants
