= Víctor Elías =

Spanish actor, singer, musical director (born 1991)

- Born: Víctor Elías Villagrasa Álvarez; March 3, 1991 (age 35); Madrid, Spain
- Occupations: Actor; singer; musician; music director
- Years active: 1995-present
- Spouse: Ana Guerra (m. 2024)
- Relatives: Menchu Álvarez del Valle (grandmother); Letizia Ortiz (second cousin)

Víctor Elías Villagrasa Álvarez (born March 3, 1991), commonly known as Víctor Elías, is a Spanish actor, singer-songwriter, and musical director.

== Biography ==
Elías was born on 3 March 1991, to father, Liberto Villagrasa Muñoz (1960–2007), a musician and his wife, Amelia Álvarez del Valle (1957–2022), an actress. He is a second cousin of Letizia Ortiz, the Queen consort of Spain.

He made his television debut in a 1998 episode of the Telecinco film series, Hermanas. Since then, he has featured as Nico in the series, Ellas son Así in 1999. He auditioned in 2001, and played the role of Carlos in the television series, Cuéntame cómo pasó. However, he was later ruled out since he was then older than the fictional character he was going to play. He had also appeared in the Antena 3 series, Antivicio.

Between 2001 and 2002, Victor starred as a supporting actor in the daily series, Esencia de Poder on Telecinco, cinematic featuring in El espinazo del diablo and El florido pensil. In 2002, he appeared for four episodes in the series, Géminis, vendetta de amor, a film which aired in the Spanish broadcasting station La 1 de Televisión Española. Prior to the next year, he played Felisín in Ya No Vive Solo, as well as chosen by Luis San Narciso and Tonucha Vidal for Los Serrano on Telecinco in the same year. He formed the SJK band group in 2005 along his colleagues from the film Los Serrano including, Natalia Sánchez, Adrián Rodríguez and Andrés de la Cruz debuting his composed song, "I want to take off". He was also part of the group, The Folks in 2007 and 2008.

Victor had an intermediate degree in piano from the Escuela de Música Creativa for modern music in Malasaña, Madrid. He proceeded to SAE Institute where he studied Audio Engineering. In 2010, he took part in Cinco Horas con Mario by Miguel Delibes. He worked on the musicals, The Call, The Hole 2, A Boy from a Magazine (performed at the Teatro La Latina) as well as directed When You Least Expect It at Teatro Rialto. Afterwards, he joined the Calle Palma group. Between 2012 and 2013, Victor he featured as Alfonso in the TVE series, Isabel.

In film making, he has been a composer, arranger, performer and producer of the soundtrack, under the Got Music label — a recording studio for music, sound and sound coverage for events that he owns together with several partners — for Ni pies, ni head by Antonio del Real, with Christian Gálvez, Jaydy Michel, Antonio Resines and Jorge Sanz, among others and composer and performer of the soundtrack of Alacrán enamored by Santiago Zannou. The soundtracks for these films have been made in the Got Music recording studio located in Arcos de la Frontera, (Cádiz).

In 2014 he participated in Aula de castigo, a web series in which he played the role of Pablo. That year she received the Artista con Corazón award at the Madrid Woman's We in 2014.

In 2016 he participated in episode 1x05 of Paquita Salas by Javier Calvo and Javier Ambrossi, playing Víctor, a pizzaiolo. The following year, he participated in the film The Call.

In 2018 he played Tom in an episode of the web series Looser by Flooxer and participated in the daily series Servir y proteger on TVE for fifteen episodes, playing the role of Remo Sempere.

He has worked with musicians such as Angy, Lucía Gil, Gemeliers, Calum, Münik, Belén Estrada, Cirilo, Diade or Manolo García.

He has collaborated with Yamaha Synths and is part of the Yamaha family of artists. He plays the keyboard and piano in one of Fran Perea's latest works, Viaja la Palabra; with Nora Norman and Taburete and is the musical director of the Vive-Premios Dial since 2017.

In 2019, he began a tour throughout Spain with La Llamada with artists such as Angy, Lucía Gil, Nerea Rodríguez, Ruth Lorenzo and Raoul Vázquez, among others.

== Personal life ==
Elías dated colleague Natalia Sánchez from 2006 to 2012, as well as singers Chanel Terrero and María Torrejón in 2017 to 2018.

Since 2021, he has been with singer Ana Guerra. In October 2023, they announced their engagement and in February 2024, they announced their wedding which will take place in October 31 of that year, being held at the Prados Moros estate, in the Sierra de Guadarrama range in Madrid. The wedding was attended by more than 300 guests, including several personalities from the world of music and television in Spain, and the ceremony was officiated by actor Fran Perea, a friend of the couple. The event was hailed as the wedding of the year by several media outlets. The religious ceremony took place the day before, this one much more intimate than the civil one. It took place in the Chapel of the Virgen del Puerto of Madrid, near the Almudena Cathedral.

== Filmography ==
=== Theater ===
- La vida breve (1995).
- El cerco de Numancia (1997).
- Mariana Pineda (1998, Teatro Bellas Artes).
- Ciclo Tebano (Edipo rey, Edipo en Colono, Antígona, Eteocles y Polinicies, 2004) de Manuel Canseco.
- La vida breve (Teatro Real).
- La zorrita astuta (Teatro Real).
- La sonámbula (Teatro Real).
- Fedra (2008–2009) de Juan Mayorga.
- Cinco horas con Mario (2010).
- Los ochenta son nuestros (2011).
- Orquesta Club Virginia (2012).
- No nos moverán (2013).
- Comida a domicilio (2013–2014).
- Cosas de tríos (2014).
- AB Negativo (2014).
- Enganchados (2014).
- La llamada (2014–2020).
- La pechuga de la sardina (2015) de Manuel Canseco.
- Cómo matar a Julio Iglesias (2015–2016).
- The Hole 2 (2015–2016).
- Yo Sostenido. Sonata para juguete roto (2024).

=== Television ===
Year	Title	Role	Chanel	Notes
1998	Hermanas		Telecinco	1 episode
1999	Ellas son así	Nico	Telecinco	18 episodes
2000	Antivicio		Antena 3	
2001 - 2002	Esencia de poder		Telecinco	
2002	Géminis, venganza de amor		La 1	4 episodes
2002	Hospital Central	Felisín	Telecinco	1 episode
2003	Javier ya no vive solo		Telecinco	1 episode
2003 - 2008	Los Serrano	Guillermo "Guille" Serrano Moreno	Telecinco	147 episodes
2011	Punta Escarlata	Ximo	Telecinco	9 episodes
2012	Isabel	Alfonso de Castilla	La 1	4 episodios
2015	Aula de castigo	Pablo Hernández	Vimeo	6 episodes (Webserie)
2016	Paquita Salas	Repartidor de Pizza	Flooxer	1 episode (Webserie)
2018	Looser	Tom	Flooxer	1 episode (Webserie)
2018	Servir y proteger	Remo Sempere	La 1	15 episodes

=== Cinema ===
Year	Title	Role	Director
2001	El espinazo del diablo		Guillermo del Toro
2002	El florido pensil	Torrecillas	Juan José Porto
2017	La llamada	Joseba	Javier Ambrossi y Javier Calvo

=== Short films ===
Year	Títle	Role	Director	Notes
2004	Nuestro pequeño secreto		Ana Martínez Almeida	
2004	Héroes de verdad	Fran	María Rodríguez Rabaldán	
2009	Volver a subir	Pablo	Michael Cooper	
2009	Sin pensarlo dos veces		Chus Gutiérrez	Short film by the Government of Spain against Gender Violence
2010	La búsqueda			
2010	I.D	Dani	Víctor Heras	Together with Natalia Sánchez
2012	El trayecto	Miguel	Nadia Martínez de Marañón	With Megan Montaner
2013	La peor excusa del mundo	Víctor		Together with Natalia Sánchez, Lolita, María Barranco, Antonio Resines, Jorge Sanz and Cristina Pedroche
2015	Clases de conquista		César Ríos	Together with Nerea Camacho
