= Vivian Benítez =

Paraguayan model

- Born: Vivian Rosana Benitez Brizuela; October 1, 1970 (age 56); Asunción, Paraguay
- Beauty pageant titleholder
- Title: Miss Paraguay 1991
- Major competitions: Miss Paraguay 1991; (Winner); Miss Universe 1991; (Top 10)

Vivián Benítez (born October 1, 1970) is a Paraguayan TV host, model and beauty pageant titleholder. She was crowned Miss Paraguay 1991 and represented her country at Miss Universe 1991 where she placed Top 10.

== Pageantry ==
Benítez was crowned Miss Paraguay in a pageant of that name, held in her country during 1991. Later, on May 17 of that same year, she attended the Miss Universe pageant held in Las Vegas, Nevada, United States.

She placed in the top 10, being the first Paraguayan in 27 years to hold that position (The last time that a Paraguayan made in the semifinals was in 1964), in addition, she was first runner-up in the National Costume award, placing after Miss Colombia.

== Personal life ==
Benítez was a Law student while participating in the Miss Paraguay and Miss Universe pageants, however, she put her studies on hold afterwards. She is a certified declamation teacher and studied History of the Arts and Journalism in the USA.

In 1992 she married diplomat and lawyer José Antonio Dos Santos. They raised 2 children. The couple divorced in 2011. Vivian worked as a television anchor in Paraguay's Channel 5 and Channel 13.

Later, she joined Paravisión's anchor staff where she anchors the morning show "Buenos días Paraguay" and later "El mañanero".
