= Los Serrano =

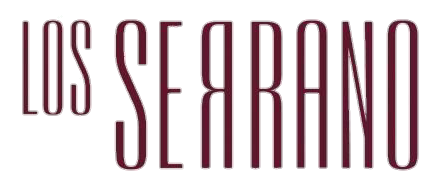
- Genre: Comedy; Drama; Teen drama
- Created by: Daniel Écija; Álex Pina
- Written by: Daniel Écija; Álex Pina; Laura Belloso; José Castillo; Pablo Alén; Mariano Baselga; Matías Basso
- Directed by: Begoña Álvarez Rojas
- Starring: Antonio Resines; Belén Rueda; Verónica Sánchez; Fran Perea; Natalia Sánchez; Víctor Elías; Jorge Jurado; Jesús Bonilla; Julia Gutiérrez Caba; Nuria González; Alejo Sauras; Alexandra Jiménez; Javier Gutiérrez; Álex González; Jimmy Barnatan; Jaydy Michel; Natalia Verbeke; Dafne Fernández; Pilar Castro; Lydia Bosch; Adrián Rodríguez; Jorge Fernández Madinabeitia; Antonio Molero; Pepa Aniorte; Goizalde Núñez; Ignacio Montes; Michel Gurfi
- Narrated by: Jorge Jurado
- Theme music composer: Mikel Erentxun
- Opening theme: "1 más 1 son 7" by Fran Perea
- Country of origin: Spain
- Original language: Spanish
- No. of seasons: 8
- No. of episodes: 147 (list of episodes)

Production
- Executive producers: Daniel Écija; Álex Pina; Begoña Álvarez Rojas; Pablo Olivares; Olga Salvador
- Producer: Globomedia
- Camera setup: Multi-camera
- Running time: 70 minutes (approx.)

Original release
- Network: Telecinco
- Release: 22 April 2003 – 17 July 2008

Los Serrano is a Spanish television drama comedy which premiered on 22 April 2003 and aired on Telecinco. It tells the story of the Serrano family, who lives in Round Santa Justa No 133, located in the fictional neighborhood of Santa Justa, in the Ribera del Manzanares, in Madrid. It was produced by Globomedia for Telecinco.

The series was a pioneer in introducing a new family model as well as being at the peak and suiting to new social currents. The origin of the plot focuses on coexistence and the differences between men and women in the same house.

== Plot ==
The series tells the life of the Serrano family

Diego Serrano (Antonio Resines), a widowed father in charge of his three sons named Marcos (Fran Perea), Guillermo (Víctor Elías), and Francisco (Jorge Jurado). Instead, Lucía (Belén Rueda) is a divorced mother of two daughters named Eva (Verónica Sánchez) and María Teresa (Natalia Sánchez). Everything changes when Lucía on a trip to the beach with her daughters on the way, suffers a puncture in her tire and the person who stops to help her is none other than Diego, her first boyfriend when she was young. After getting married, both families will have to live under the same roof and forced to understand each other despite the many differences.

== Cast ==
=== Serrano Family ===
- Diego Serrano Sanz (Antonio Resines) He is the youngest son of Amancio and Francisca, the younger brother of Francisco and Santiago, the widower of Marta, the father of Marcos, Guille and Curro, the husband of Lucía, the paternal grandfather of Cloét, the son-in-law of Carmen, the brother-in-law of Elena, Eva and Teté's stepfather, Santiaguín's paternal uncle and Eva and Teté's father-in-law. He is a bartender in his forties and soccer fan, a widowed father of three sons. Obsessed with keeping the peace in the family at any cost, and sometimes very bad-thinking, seeing things where there aren't any, which he plots the dirty look. He is a traditional and pragmatic man who, after the death of his first wife, has taken care of his children alone. When marrying Lucía for the second time, his main priority in life is to be happy with her. (seasons 1–8)
- Marcos Serrano Moreno (Fran Perea) He is the eldest son of Diego and Marta, the older brother of Guille and Curro, the father of Cloét, the grandson of Amancio, Francisca, Benito and Sagrario, the son-in-law of Sergi and Lucía, the stepson of Lucía, the stepbrother of Eva and Teté, the brother-in-law of Teté, the nephew of Francisco and Santiago, Santiaguín's cousin, Carmen's grandson-in-law and Elena's nephew-in-law. When his father marries Lucía, he is 17 years old and is the star player of Santa Justa F.C., in addition to playing the guitar and being a singer-songwriter. (seasons 1–8)
- Guillermo Serrano Moreno (Víctor Elías) He is the middle son of Diego and Marta, the older brother of Curro and younger brother of Marcos, the uncle of Cloét, the grandson of Amancio, Francisca, Benito and Sagrario, the son-in-law of Sergi and Lucía, the stepson of Lucía, the stepbrother of Eva and Teté, the brother-in-law of Eva, the nephew of Francisco and Santiago, Santiaguín's cousin, Carmen's grandson-in-law and Elena's nephew-in-law. When his father marries Lucía, he is 11 years old, and he is very mischievous and rebellious. He is the leader of his group of friends and spends his days playing dirty jokes on as many people as possible. Guille does not have a good relationship with his father. (seasons 1–8)
- Francisco "Curro" Serrano Moreno (Jorge Jurado) He is the youngest son of Diego and Marta, the younger brother of Guille and Marcos, the uncle of Cloét, the grandson of Amancio, Francisca, Benito and Sagrario, the brother-in-law of Eva and Teté, the stepbrother of Eva and Teté, the stepson of Lucía, the nephew of Francisco and Santiago and the cousin of Santiaguín. He sees his father get married for the second time at the age of 8. In the final stretch of his father's dream, Curro will commit a crime that will result in his internment in a reform school, to everyone's surprise, and his father's disappointment. (seasons 1–8)
- Santiago Serrano Sanz (Jesús Bonilla) He is Diego's older brother and partner in the tavern, as well as president of Santa Justa F.C. Married for more than forty years, he runs the Serrano Tavern with his brother, idolizes his deceased father and has him as a role model. He is stingy, ill-considered, lonely and grumpy, his greatest fear is to be left alone in life. (seasons 1–8)
- Francisco Serrano Sanz (Alfredo Landa) He is Diego and Santiago's older brother. He deceived his family in terms of his lifestyle since he emigrated to Mexico and became a professional con man. He needs money and therefore decides to return home to get it. What he does not imagine is that, on his return, he will fall in love with his little brother's new mother-in-law, Doña Carmen. Finally forgiven by his brothers and abandoned by Carmen, the older brother returns to Mexico. (season 2)
- Pepe (Cook) Is the dog of the Serrano family. It brings several headaches to the members of the family, but under Curro's care, Pepe is considered one more in the family. (seasons 4–8)
- Amancio "Padre" Serrano (Jesús Bonilla) He is the father of Francisco, Santiago and Diego, he is the paternal grandfather of Marcos, Guille, Curro and Santiaguín, he is the paternal great-grandfather of Cloét, he is the father-in-law of Lourditas and the grandfather-in-law of Eva and Teté. Originally from Alcarria, where he had a tavern, he moved to Madrid to find Taberna Serrano with his children. He has a great physical resemblance to Santiago, from whom he inherited his cantankerous and uncompromising character. His portrait presides over the Serrano Tavern.
- Benito Moreno (Fernando Ransanz) He is the father of Marta Moreno, he is the maternal grandfather of Marcos, Guille and Curro, he is the paternal great-grandfather of Cloét and he is the grandfather-in-law of Eva and Teté. He sullied the marriage bed with La pollera, which his wife did not like and she moved for a few days to live in Los Serrano's house.
- Francisca "Madre" Sanz (Goizalde Núñez) She is the mother of Francisco, Santiago and Diego, she is the paternal grandmother of Marcos, Guille, Curro and Santiaguín, the paternal great-grandmother of Cloét, the mother-in-law of Lourditas and the grandmother-in-law of Eva and Teté. She had a preference for Diego, before the others. According to his diary, he had an extramarital relationship with "El Aceituno," Pablo Prieto, an olive grower from Alcarria, before Diego was born, for which Diego feared that he was his real biological father. He bears a strong physical resemblance to Lourditas.
- Sagrario (Silvia Casanova) She is the mother of Marta Moreno, she is the wife of Benito, she is the maternal grandmother of Marcos, Guille and Curro, the paternal great-grandmother of Cloét and the grandmother-in-law of Eva and Teté. After his horns, she moved to live in the Serrano house, but later she reconciled with Benito, thanks to Carmen's intervention.
- Tía Enriqueta Sanz She is the aunt of Santiago, Diego and Francisco, the great-aunt of Marcos, Guille, Curro and Santiaguín, the great-grandaunt of Cloét and the great-aunt-in-law of Eva and Teté. She lives in the town. Her siblings names are Francisca, Eulalia, Avelino and Antonio.

=== Capdevila-Gómez Family ===
- Lucía Gómez Casado (Belén Rueda) She is the daughter of Carmen, sister of Elena, wife of Diego, mother of Eva and María Teresa, maternal grandmother of Cloét, aunt of Luna and Juan, stepmother of Marcos, Guille and Curro and mother-in-law of Marcos and Guille. She is a Spanish language teacher. Born in Madrid, when she was young she moved to Barcelona, where she married and had two daughters. After separating from her husband, and returning with her eldest daughters to her childhood home, she has a flat tire in her car. To her surprise, it is Diego who helps her out of trouble and they decide to make up for the lost time. They recover it so much that they even decide to get married and move in together with their respective children. (seasons 1–6)
- Eva Capdevila Gómez (Verónica Sánchez) She is the eldest daughter of Sergi and Lucía, the older sister of Teté, the granddaughter of Carmen, the niece of Elena, the cousin of Ruth, Manu, Luna and Juan, the stepsister of Marcos, Guille and Curro, the sister-in-law of Guille and Curro, the cousin-in-law of Santiaguín, Diego's stepdaughter, Diego and Marta's daughter-in-law and Cloét's mother. When her mother marries Diego, she is 17 years old and is very responsible and mature. Leaving her hippie boyfriend in Barcelona. (seasons 1–5)
- María Teresa "Teté" Capdevila Gómez (Natalia Sánchez) She is the youngest daughter of Sergi and Lucía, the younger sister of Eva, the granddaughter of Carmen, the niece of Elena, the cousin of Ruth, Manu, Luna and Juan, the stepsister of Marcos, Guille and Curro, the sister-in-law of Marcos and Curro, the cousin-in-law of Santiaguín, Diego's stepdaughter, Diego and Marta's daughter-in-law and the aunt of Cloét. When her mother marries Diego, she is 11 years old. She is Yoli's best friend with whom she has shared many moments since they were little. (seasons 1–8)
- Carmen Casado Robles (Julia Gutiérrez Caba) She is Lucía and Elena's mother, the maternal grandmother of Eva, María Teresa, Luna and Juan, the maternal great-grandmother of Cloét, Diego's mother-in-law, the grandmother-in-law of Marcos and Guille. Carmen is a widow who ends up finding a new family in her neighbours, she even had a love story with her son-in-law's brother, Francisco, which did not end well. (seasons 1–8)
- Ruth Castell Capdevila (Leticia Dolera) She is Sergi's niece, who lived at the Serrano's house for a while, she is the liberal cousin of Eva and Teté, and who had a relationship with Álex but they end up leaving him for unknown reasons. (season 4)
- Sergi Capdevila (Josep María Mas & Helio Pedregal) He is the ex-husband of Lucía, he is the father of Eva and María Teresa, the maternal grandfather of Cloét and the father-in-law of Marcos and Guille. (seasons 1, 2 & 4)
- Manuel "Manu" Capdevila (Pablo Galán) He is Sergi's nephew, he is Eva and Teté's cousin, he is from Barcelona who comes to Madrid looking for a “change of scenery”. He is a student of PE, a sportsman and very successful among girls. His "uncle" Diego nicknames him "Spartacus" and constantly reproaches him for walking around the house without a shirt, because "there are many hormones fluttering around the house" alluding to Teté. He finds a job as a teacher of extracurricular activities at Colegio Garcilaso and in his free time, he practices cycling. Although he first fell in love with his cousin Teté, he maintained a relationship with Africa for more than six months. He is quite a believer, which will cause Teté bitterness. (season 6)

=== Serrano-Capdevila Family ===
- Marcos Serrano Moreno (Fran Perea) Despite having many differences with his older stepsister Eva, he ends up falling in love with her and, after comings and goings, they end up being parents of a girl while living together in the French city of Toulouse. (seasons 1–8)
- Guillermo Serrano Moreno (Víctor Elías) Throughout the series he matures, and he falls in love with his stepsister Teté. Teté is determined to go to Barcelona with her father, when Guille overhears Teté's conversation with her father by mistake, he finds out that she wants to go to Barcelona and that she wasn't going to tell anyone, Guille argues with her and tells her that she only thinks about herself and does not think about him or the other people. Teté sends a letter to Guille by mail telling him how much she loves him and asking him to please never forget her. Guille, willing to reconcile with Teté and resume his relationship with her again, makes a search for her with little love notes that he pastes all over the house. When Teté does not arrive at school, Guille realizes that she has left and that he has lost her. Celia and Teté arrive at the Serrano's house, Guille surprised and happy to see her, asks her when they are finally alone what happened that she didn't leave and she tells him to forgive her for everything she did to him and tells him that she wanted to start a life from scratch in Barcelona but that she does not want to start anything if he is not there. Guille and Teté's relationship faces a new obstacle. Teté is late for her period, which will lead the couple to consider a possible pregnancy. After Guille was forced to tell Diego that he and Teté are dating again and that he would be the baby's father if the pregnancy test had come out positive, angry with Guille and Teté, Diego throws them out of the house and tells them that they have a week to look for a job and a place to live. They go to live in Barcelona and start a life together. (seasons 1–8)
- Eva Capdevila Gómez (Verónica Sánchez) Little by little Eva falls in love with her very different stepbrother Marcos. They are going to live together in the French city of Toulouse, where she studies Psychology and they are parents of a girl. (seasons 1–5)
- María Teresa "Teté" Capdevila Gómez (Natalia Sánchez) Throughout the series she matures, she ends up in love with her stepbrother Guille. Teté is determined to go to Barcelona with her father, when Guille overhears Teté's conversation with her father by mistake, he finds out that she wants to go to Barcelona and that she wasn't going to tell anyone, Guille argues with her and tells her that she only thinks about herself and does not think about him or the other people. Teté sends a letter to Guille by mail telling him how much she loves him and asking him to please never forget her. Guille, willing to reconcile with Teté and resume his relationship with her again, makes a search for her with little love notes that he pastes all over the house. When Teté does not arrive at school, Guille realizes that she has left and that he has lost her. Celia and Teté arrive at the Serrano's house, Guille surprised and happy to see her, asks her when they are finally alone what happened that she didn't leave and she tells him to forgive her for everything she did to him and tells him that she wanted to start a life from scratch in Barcelona but that she does not want to start anything if he is not there. Guille and Teté's relationship faces a new obstacle. Teté is late for her period, which will lead the couple to consider a possible pregnancy. After Guille was forced to tell Diego that he and Teté are dating again and that he would be the baby's father if the pregnancy test had come out positive, angry with Guille and Teté, Diego throws them out of the house and tells them that they have a week to look for a job and a place to live. They go to live in Barcelona and start a life together. (seasons 1–8)
- Cloét Serrano Capdevila She is the daughter of Marcos and Eva, great-granddaughter of Carmen, Amancio, Francisca, Benito and Sagrario, granddaughter of Diego, Marta, Sergi and Lucía, niece of Guille, Teté and Curro, great-niece of Santiago, Elena and Francisco and cousin of Luna, Manu, Ruth, Juan and Santiaguín. (seasons 6 & 7)

=== Serrano-Salgado Family ===
- Santiago Serrano Sanz (Jesús Bonilla) He is Diego's older brother and partner in the tavern, as well as president of Santa Justa F.C. Married for more than forty years, he runs the Serrano Tavern with his brother, idolizes his deceased father and has him as a role model. He is stingy, ill-considered, lonely and grumpy, his greatest fear is to be left alone in life. He married Lourdes, the Religion teacher at Colegio Garcilaso de la Vega, and after many problems, due to Santi's bad eating habits, they conceived a child. That same day, Santi, after some bad investments in the stock market, lost the capital of Taberna Serrano, which was bought by Emilia, who hired Santi and Diego as waiters. In the last episode, his second child was born, a girl. (seasons 1–8)
- María Lourdes "Lourditas" Salgado Fernández (Goizalde Núñez) She is the sappy religion teacher at school, who later marries Santiago. She is very good with the children of the school who take her as a constant object of their misdeeds. Due to her religiosity and her mother's strong education, she is very shy with men, and although from the beginning of the series, she went out with Santiago several times, they did not hit it off, and she even almost entered a nunnery after being disappointed with this one. Currently, she has had a son with Santiago whom they have baptized with the name Santiago, Santiaguín. In the last episode, her second child was born, a girl. (seasons 1–8)
- Santiago "Santiaguín" Serrano Salgado He is the eldest son of Santiago and Lourditas. (seasons 6–8)
- ¿? Serrano Salgado She is the newborn daughter of Santiago and Lourditas, whose name is never known. (season 8)

=== Peralta-Gómez Family ===
- Elena Gómez Casado (Lydia Bosch) She is Carmen's daughter, Lucía's sister and Teté and Eva's aunt who returned from Seville after separating from her husband Juan with whom she has two children Juan and Luna. When she was a teenager she loved Diego until she found out that Diego loved Lucía. She replaces Fernando at school because he is writing a book and plays a psychologist, helping Diego above all. She has some confrontations with Diego and Carmen because of the way they educate their children since she is too "soft" because of the trouble that her son Juan gets Curro into. (season 8)
- Luna Peralta Gómez (Dafne Fernández) She is the daughter of Elena and Juan, older sister of Juan, granddaughter of Carmen, niece of the late Lucía and cousin of Teté and Eva. She is an excellent dancer and ends up joining Guille and Teté's group despite her initial differences with her cousin Teté. (season 8)
- Juan Peralta Gómez (Ignacio Montes) He is the son of Elena and Juan, younger brother of Luna, grandson of Carmen, nephew of the late Lucía and cousin of Teté and Eva. He is a mischievous boy, who has his mother under control with his lies, and ends up leading Curro astray. (season 8)

=== Martínez Family ===
- Fructuoso Guillermo "Fiti" Martínez Carrasco (Antonio Molero) He is Diego and Santiago's best friend, a car mechanic. Married to Candela but divorced. (seasons 1–8)
- Candelaria "Candela" Blanco Fernández (Nuria González) She is Fiti's ex-wife, Raúl's mother, Adrián's grandmother and Lucía's co-worker. (seasons 1–5)
- Raúl Alfredo Martínez Blanco (Alejo Sauras) He is the son of Fiti and Candela, father of Adrián, nephew of Choni, Ana and Andrés, and Marcos's best friend. (seasons 1–8)
- María Asunción "Choni" Martínez Carrasco (Pepa Aniorte) She is the sister of Fiti, aunt of Raúl, great-aunt of Adrián, wife of José Luis, sister-in-law of Candela and Lourditas, and Adela's daughter-in-law. (seasons 5–8)
- Adrían Martínez He is the son of Raúl, the great-grandson of Andrés and Mariví, the grandson of Fiti and Candela, the great-nephew of Andrés, Ana and Choni. (season 7)

=== Blanco Family ===
- Andrés Blanco Fernández (Jorge Fernández Madinabeitia) He is the son of Andrés and Mariví, he is Ana's older brother and Candela's younger brother, Fiti's brother-in-law, Raúl's uncle and Adrián's great-uncle. During the first season, he was the director of Garcilaso and president of Santa Justa FC. He doesn't get along with his brother-in-law, Fiti, who is opposed to him, although they share a love of motorcycles. (season 1)
- Ana Blanco Fernández (Natalia Verbeke) She is the youngest daughter of Andrés and Mariví, she is the younger sister of Andrés and Candela, the sister-in-law of Fiti, the aunt of Raúl and the great-aunt of Adrián. She moved to the United States when she was 18 years old, but she returned to Santa Justa to revive the school due to the low economic results recently registered and to introduce a new work methodology among teachers. Inside the school, she has the same bad character as Candela, although outside the school she is quite friendly. In the last chapter, she reconciles with Fiti. (seasons 6–8)
- Mariví Fernández de la Era (María Luisa Merlo) She is the mother of Candela, Andrés and Ana, she came to Santa Justa for her daughter to ask her uncle Eusebio, brother of Mariví's husband, whose name is Andrés Blanco, for money.

=== Salgado-Martínez Family ===
- José Luis "Josico" Salgado Fernández (Javier Gutiérrez) He is Lourditas's brother and Choni's husband. (seasons 5–8)
- María Asunción "Choni" Martínez Carrasco (Pepa Aniorte) She is the sister of Fiti, aunt of Raúl, great-aunt of Adrián, wife of José Luis, sister-in-law of Candela and Lourditas, and Adela's daughter-in-law. (seasons 5–8)

=== Garcilaso de la Vega School staff ===
- Celia Montenegro (Jaydy Michel) The English teacher. Born in Mexico. She is a sweet and refined young woman, and in her past, she was a great star of Mexican soap operas and is separated from a famous Brazilian writer. After she arrives in Madrid and the Garcilaso, she becomes a great friend of Choni and falls in love with Diego. (seasons 6–8)
- África Sanz (Alexandra Jiménez) Former student of the school, daughter of a police officer, she was Raúl's girlfriend and Eva and Teté's best friend. She currently works at the Garcilaso de la Vega School as a Dance teacher. She left him with Raúl for good after he discovered her secret relationship with Manu. She later becomes pregnant with Gael, Celia's little brother, but decides to stay with Raúl. (seasons 2–8)
- Raquel Albadalejo (Elsa Pataky) Lucía's substitute teacher. She is separated and has a son. She had a forbidden relationship with Marcos for a while, which almost cost her her job. At the end of the season, he leaves Santa Justa and leaves Marcos for good. (season 2)
- Fernando González (Ales Furundarena) Although erroneously known by Diego, Santi and Fiti as Fermín. He is the school psychologist and advises Diego on countless occasions so that he can help his family. He is homosexual, and Diego and Santi try to return the favour, helping him come out of the closet and trying to get his previous partner, Carlos, back with him. Fernando encouraged Diego to study a psychology course. (seasons 1–8)
- Gael Montenegro (Michel Gurfi) He is Celia's younger brother and joins in the last season as a music teacher at the Garcilaso de la Vega School. She maintains a sporadic relationship with Africa, from which a pregnancy arises. (season 8)

=== Garcilaso de la Vega School students ===
- David "DVD" Bornás (Adrián Rodríguez) He is a friend of Guille, Teté, Boliche, Yoli and Valdano. He is a boy who is fond of computers, breaks dancing and hip-hop. Together with Boliche, Teté and Guille, he formed the group Santa Justa Klan. He is in love with Teté, but she is not and on one occasion she use him to make Guille jealous. (seasons 4–8)
- Octavio "Chucky" Salas (Jimmy Barnatán) He is a friend of Marcos and Raúl. He is the most swindler of the three and used to collaborate in Raúl's plans. He is currently out of Santa Justa. (seasons 1–5)
- José María "Boliche" Bellido (Andrés de la Cruz) He is Guille's best friend, son of Fritangas, a neighbourhood acquaintance and Yoli's brother. He is secretly in love with Teté. (seasons 1–8)
- Yolanda Bellido (Sara Brasal) She is Teté's best friend and the sister of Boliche. Like her brother, plump, and she also wears glasses, which is why she has a complex. She is an idealistic girl looking for her first love; is in love with Valdano. (seasons 1–8)
- Matías "Valdano" Scobich (Juan Luppi) He is Argentinian and Guille's best friend. He fell in love with his teacher, Lucía. In the 2nd season, he returned to his country, but in the 4th, he returned to the Garcilaso de la Vega School, in the 7th season he almost went to Argentina because his parents got a job there, but he stayed taking care of his grandmother. (seasons 1–2; 4–8)
- Helena Rivera (María Bonet) She met Raúl at a party, and had a fleeting relationship with him. Raúl was in for a major surprise when Helena became the new student in the class and became intimate with África. Helena's father is a soccer player representative. (season 5)
- Alejandro Chacón (Álex Barahona) He is Eva's fling, who after many scuffles joined the gang, and enrolled in the Garcilaso to be closer to Eva, despite living on the other side of the city. They call him the firefighter, due to his vocation, which he exercises in the following season. He left the series along with Helena, taking a year's sabbatical around the world. (seasons 3–5)
- Mustafá Rasit (Daniel Esparza) Guille's friend, he is the son of Moroccan parents who run a kebab place and his parents do not speak Spanish. (seasons 1–3)
- Ricardo "Richi" López (Carlos Rodríguez) He is a juvenile delinquent, Guille's rival, who dated Teté for a while. He went to his village and never came back. (seasons 3–5)
- Humberto (Christian Criado) He is Teté's ex-boyfriend, who was having a relationship with Lorena at the same time, Teté discovered him thanks to Guille, and Teté falls in love with Guille in the same episode in which she breaks up with Humberto. (seasons 3–4)
- Lorena (Marie-Anne Favreau) She has been the girlfriend of Guille and Humberto. She has a reputation as an easy girl. She has large breasts for her age, which is why she is also known as "Las Bufas". (seasons 3–4)
- Díez (Javier Bódalo) He is a shy boy with glasses, the object of all Guille's jokes. (seasons 3–5)

== Opening song ==
"1 más 1 son 7" (English: "One Plus One Is Seven") is a song by Spanish singer and actor Fran Perea produced by Mikel Erentxun. It served as the opening song of the famous soap opera Los Serrano where Perea played the role of Marcos. "1 más 1 son 7" portrays the life of the novel's two protagonists Diego and Lucia after their marriage and describes the daily lives of the protagonists and their family. The song was called a "song that marked an entire generation... an authentic icon of Spanish society". During an interview, Perea revealed how his role in the movie brought him a lot of pressure from the fame which made him leave the show earlier and generated avoidance and repulsion from the song. In 2025, during an interview with Al cielo con ella, Perea revealed how he did not receive money for the song nor author's credits as it was an adaptation of "Grandes Éxitos", from the album Ciudades de paso by Duncan Dhu. To promote the song, a music video was filmed showing Perea playing the song in a warehouse, accompanied by a guitar.

On 21 April 2023, a new version of the song featuring Despistaos was recorded along with a music video directed by Ángel Velasco which marked a reunion of the original cast of the show: Antonio Resines, Belén Rueda, Jorge Jurado, Víctor Elías, Natalia Sánchez and Verónica Sánchez appear in it. This version of the song was part of an album titled Uno más uno son veinte (2024). The new version of the song was very well received by the audience, most of whom expressed feelings of nostalgia towards the series. The video opens with Perea greeting fellow guitar players as he sends a message to the other six fellow members of the family to join them. The rest of the video shows the band performing the song together while each of the family members receives the message on their phones. They then get to meet behind the scenes and go to the apartment of Resines. Towards the end of the song they all begin to dance together together with the band. The final scene shows the laying on a coach as they pose for the camera. To promote the song, Perea performed it live during the 29th Forqué Awards held in Madrid on 16 December 2023. He also performed it live during the New Year's eve televised program on RTVE Música in 2025.

== Episode list ==
=== First Season ===
| No. overall | No. in season | Title | Original air date | Viewers | Share |
|---|---|---|---|---|---|
| 1 | 1 | Ya se han casado | 22 April 2003 | 4,286,000 | 26.1% |
| 2 | 2 | Un padre perfecto | 29 April 2003 | 4,519,000 | 27.2% |
| 3 | 3 | Siempre nos quedará París | 6 May 2003 | 4,640,000 | 26.0% |
| 4 | 4 | El Atlético de Santa Justa F.C. | 13 May 2003 | 4,368,000 | 26.4% |
| 5 | 5 | Me gusta cuando callas | 20 May 2003 | 5,089,000 | 31.2% |
| 6 | 6 | Cien maneras de cocinar la trucha | 27 May 2003 | 5,154,000 | 31.7% |
| 7 | 7 | No me llames iluso | 3 June 2003 | 5,364,000 | 32.8% |
| 8 | 8 | La noche del loro | 10 June 2003 | 4,937,000 | 31.0% |
| 9 | 9 | Superdotado | 17 June 2003 | 5,475,000 | 35.5% |
| 10 | 10 | El rey y yo | 24 June 2003 | 4,872,000 | 34.9% |
| 11 | 11 | Una noche en Mogambo | 1 July 2003 | 4,797,000 | 33.6% |
| 12 | 12 | Benny, Tonny y Marky | 8 July 2003 | 4,459,000 | 34.0% |
| 13 | 13 | La guerra de los Martínez | 15 July 2003 | 4,889,000 | 36.0% |

=== Second Season ===
| No. overall | No. in season | Title | Original air date | Viewers | Share |
|---|---|---|---|---|---|
| 14 | 1 | Bienvenido, tío Francisco | 11 November 2003 | 6,370,000 | 36.0% |
| 15 | 2 | Enhorabuena por el programa | 18 November 2003 | 6,270,000 | 35.4% |
| 16 | 3 | El quinto sentido | 25 November 2003 | 6,139,000 | 36.8% |
| 17 | 4 | Trigo limpio | 2 December 2003 | 6,901,000 | 40.5% |
| 18 | 5 | Santiago vuelve a la escuela | 9 December 2003 | 6,809,000 | 39.5% |
| 19 | 6 | Donde hay jamón hay ilusión | 16 December 2003 | 6,341,000 | 35.5% |
| 20 | 7 | Sodoma y Gomera | 13 January 2004 | 7,243,000 | 39.3% |
| 21 | 8 | La mirada del tigre | 20 January 2004 | 7,634,000 | 41.9% |
| 22 | 9 | Eva al desnudo | 27 January 2004 | 7,237,000 | 39.1% |
| 23 | 10 | El rey de espadas | 3 February 2004 | 7,345,000 | 39.7% |
| 24 | 11 | Casado y monógamo | 5 February 2004 | 6,992,000 | 38.9% |
| 25 | 12 | Solo puede quedar uno | 12 February 2004 | 7,145,000 | 40.0% |
| 26 | 13 | Natalie | 19 February 2004 | 7,649,000 | 42.1% |

=== Third Season ===
| No. overall | No. in season | Title | Original air date | Viewers | Share |
|---|---|---|---|---|---|
| 27 | 1 | El carnaval veneciano | 26 February 2004 | 7,603,000 | 42.1% |
| 28 | 2 | Los toros de Santa Justa | 4 March 2004 | 7,630,000 | 41.9% |
| 29 | 3 | Ser o no ser... taladrador | 11 March 2004 | 6,637,000 | 36.4% |
| 30 | 4 | Yo confieso | 18 March 2004 | 7,291,000 | 42.7% |
| 31 | 5 | El otro lado de la acera | 25 March 2004 | 8,175,000 | 44.5% |
| 32 | 6 | Los puentes de Burundi | 1 April 2004 | 8,191,000 | 43.3% |
| 33 | 7 | La Jamoneta | 14 April 2004 | 5,824,000 | 31.8% |
| 34 | 8 | El uso del matrimonio | 21 April 2004 | 6,955,000 | 37.1% |
| 35 | 9 | Corazón partío | 28 April 2004 | 7,522,000 | 38.2% |
| 36 | 10 | Recuerdos de Segovia | 5 May 2004 | 6,251,000 | 32.1% |
| 37 | 11 | El ciruelo | 12 May 2004 | 6,365,000 | 32.7% |
| 38 | 12 | La vuelta al cole | 19 May 2004 | 6,443,000 | 35.4% |
| 39 | 13 | Nunca subestimes el poder de un ñu | 27 May 2004 | 6,619,000 | 36.1% |
| 40 | 14 | Un año selvático | 2 June 2004 | 6,268,000 | 36.1% |
| 41 | 15 | La bicha | 10 June 2004 | 6,350,000 | 36.6% |
| 42 | 16 | Spanish mazapan | 16 June 2004 | 6,364,000 | 36.6% |
| 43 | 17 | Descubriendo a Marta | 23 June 2004 | 4,940,000 | 35.1% |
| 44 | 18 | Don Quijote de Santa Justa | 30 June 2004 | 5,965,000 | 38.0% |
| 45 | 19 | El fluido básico | 7 July 2004 | 6,713,000 | 42.6% |

=== Fourth Season ===
| No. overall | No. in season | Title | Original air date | Viewers | Share |
|---|---|---|---|---|---|
| 46 | 1 | Santiago Gigoló | 12 January 2005 | 6,416,000 | 32.8% |
| 47 | 2 | Ni media ni guarra | 19 January 2005 | 5,594,000 | 29.1% |
| 48 | 3 | El Conde du Mamarrach | 26 January 2005 | 5,772,000 | 29.0% |
| 49 | 4 | Desde Londres con amor | 2 February 2005 | 5,738,000 | 28.8% |
| 50 | 5 | Ante la duda... | 9 February 2005 | 5,498,000 | 27.0% |
| 51 | 6 | La donante de órganos | 16 February 2005 | 5,903,000 | 29.7% |
| 52 | 7 | El lecho mancillado | 23 February 2005 | 5,910,000 | 29.9% |
| 53 | 8 | La culpa es yo | 3 March 2005 | 5,893,000 | 30.8% |
| 54 | 9 | Apechugueision | 9 March 2005 | 4,979,000 | 25.6% |
| 55 | 10 | En ocasiones veo Fitis | 16 March 2005 | 5,758,000 | 30.7% |
| 56 | 11 | Lobestoris | 23 March 2005 | 6,098,000 | 38.2% |
| 57 | 12 | Hay una rosquilla para ti | 30 March 2005 | 7,306,000 | 40.9% |
| 58 | 13 | No apto para cardíacos | 6 April 2005 | 6,029,000 | 31.6% |
| 59 | 14 | Yo azuzo | 13 April 2005 | 5,457,000 | 28.7% |
| 60 | 15 | Antes muerta que chinchilla | 20 April 2005 | 5,683,000 | 29.6% |
| 61 | 16 | El hombre que susurraba a las frutitas | 27 April 2005 | 6,152,000 | 34.0% |
| 62 | 17 | Yo reconozco | 4 May 2005 | 6,823,000 | 37.4% |
| 63 | 18 | ¿Quién me pone la pierna encima? | 11 May 2005 | 5,725,000 | 30.7% |
| 64 | 19 | Million Dollar Grogui | 18 May 2005 | 5,931,000 | 32.2% |
| 65 | 20 | Una proposición indecente | 25 May 2005 | 4,888,000 | 25.6% |
| 66 | 21 | Usufructus | 1 June 2005 | 5,629,000 | 30.8% |
| 67 | 22 | El reverso tenebroso | 8 June 2005 | 4,742,000 | 25.8% |
| 68 | 23 | De Santa Justa a Bilbao | 15 June 2005 | 5,334,000 | 30.3% |
| 69 | 24 | Yo de Alcarria y tú de California | 22 June 2005 | 4,742,000 | 27.9% |
| 70 | 25 | Mainfroinlain | 29 June 2005 | 4,578,000 | 28.2% |
| 71 | 26 | Gato negro, casorio blanco | 6 July 2005 | 5,270,000 | 36.7% |

=== Fifth Season ===
| No. overall | No. in season | Title | Original air date | Viewers | Share |
|---|---|---|---|---|---|
| 72 | 1 | ¿Quién puede matar a un cerdo? | 20 December 2005 | 5,692,000 | 30.6% |
| 73 | 2 | La maldición de las Capdevila | 27 December 2005 | 5,351,000 | 29.3% |
| 74 | 3 | El blues del matrimonio | 3 January 2006 | 5,570,000 | 30.5% |
| 75 | 4 | La pertinaz sequía | 10 January 2006 | 4,909,000 | 25.6% |
| 76 | 5 | Gibraltar español | 17 January 2006 | 4,913,000 | 26.3% |
| 77 | 6 | Cuando padre sonríe | 26 January 2006 | 4,903,000 | 25.2% |
| 78 | 7 | El reparto de Africa | 2 February 2006 | 4,380,000 | 22.6% |
| 79 | 8 | El armario empotrado | 9 February 2006 | 4,610,000 | 25.2% |
| 80 | 9 | La alegría de la huerta | 16 February 2006 | 4,638,000 | 24.7% |
| 81 | 10 | Como una ola | 23 February 2006 | 4,127,000 | 22.0% |
| 82 | 11 | Las de Caín | 2 March 2006 | 5,011,000 | 27.2% |
| 83 | 12 | Ay, Candela | 9 March 2006 | 5,056,000 | 28.0% |
| 84 | 13 | El toro por los cuernos | 16 March 2006 | 5,235,000 | 30.6% |
| 85 | 14 | Soy nenuco | 23 March 2006 | 5,477,000 | 31.5% |
| 86 | 15 | Qué mal está Occidente | 30 March 2006 | 5,252,000 | 30.5% |
| 87 | 16 | ¿Tú te crees que la policía es tonta? | 6 April 2006 | 4,821,000 | 27.7% |
| 88 | 17 | Un pez llamado Fructu | 20 April 2006 | 3,937,000 | 24.0% |
| 89 | 18 | La culpa fue del centollo | 27 April 2006 | 4,027,000 | 23.9% |
| 90 | 19 | El primer Serrano universitario | 4 May 2006 | 3,846,000 | 22.6% |
| 91 | 20 | Tracatrá, suspensos y cintas de vídeo | 11 May 2006 | 4,176,000 | 24.1% |
| 92 | 21 | ¿Tú te afeitas, Guille? | 18 May 2006 | 3,866,000 | 22.6% |
| 93 | 22 | Pero, ¿quién mató a padre? | 25 May 2006 | 4,205,000 | 25.9% |
| 94 | 23 | La llamada de la selva | 8 June 2006 | 3,902,000 | 24.7% |
| 95 | 24 | El síntoma de Estocolmo | 15 June 2006 | 3,821,000 | 24.5% |
| 96 | 25 | ¡Será por dinero! | 22 June 2006 | 3,424,000 | 24.2% |
| 97 | 26 | La jauría del hortelano | 29 June 2006 | 3,729,000 | 25.1% |

=== Sixth Season ===
| No. overall | No. in season | Title | Original air date | Viewers | Share |
|---|---|---|---|---|---|
| 98 | 1 | La pasión según Fructuoso | 2 January 2007 | 5,149,000 | 27.2% |
| 99 | 2 | Aquí huele a perro | 9 January 2007 | 4,739,000 | 24.4% |
| 100 | 3 | Los puentes de la Alcarria | 16 January 2007 | 4,695,000 | 24.9% |
| 101 | 4 | El talonario de Aquiles | 23 January 2007 | 4,452,000 | 22.5% |
| 102 | 5 | Il bambino della strada | 30 January 2007 | 4,704,000 | 24.3% |
| 103 | 6 | Amar es transigir | 6 February 2007 | 4,178,000 | 21.3% |
| 104 | 7 | Los tres cerditos | 13 February 2007 | 4,035,000 | 21.2% |
| 105 | 8 | Paseando a Miss Emilia | 20 February 2007 | 3,926,000 | 21.9% |
| 106 | 9 | El declive del Imperio Serrano | 27 February 2007 | 4,155,000 | 24.1% |
| 107 | 10 | Las fases del amor | 6 March 2007 | 5,183,000 | 28.6% |
| 108 | 11 | El rastrillo zen | 13 March 2007 | 5,103,000 | 28.6% |
| 109 | 12 | El jamon maltés | 20 March 2007 | 4,422,000 | 24.7% |
| 110 | 13 | El padrivo IV | 27 March 2007 | 3,990,000 | 21.8% |
| 111 | 14 | Donde dijo digo, digo Diego | 3 April 2007 | 3,946,000 | 23.3% |
| 112 | 15 | Soy Koala | 10 April 2007 | 4,172,000 | 23.2% |
| 113 | 16 | Ese olor tan characterístico | 17 April 2007 | 4,638,000 | 26.0% |
| 114 | 17 | Charol de leopardo | 24 April 2007 | 3,985,000 | 24.7% |
| 115 | 18 | Breve historia de la filosofía | 1 May 2007 | 3,264,000 | 18.9% |
| 116 | 19 | Algo pasa con Celia | 8 May 2007 | 4,065,000 | 22.4% |
| 117 | 20 | Un año de soledad | 15 May 2007 | 4,110,000 | 23.7% |
| 118 | 21 | La sombra de Candelaria es alargada | 22 May 2007 | 4,143,000 | 23.8% |
| 119 | 22 | La penitencia va por detras | 29 May 2007 | 4,210,000 | 24.0% |
| 120 | 23 | La mano amiga | 5 June 2007 | 3,982,000 | 22.8% |
| 121 | 24 | Siempre positivo, nunca negativo | 12 June 2007 | 3,781,000 | 22.1% |
| 122 | 25 | La parábola del hijo prófugo | 19 June 2007 | 4,163,000 | 24.4% |
| 123 | 26 | Dos mujeres y un Serrano | 26 June 2007 | 3,917,000 | 23.5% |
| 124 | 27 | Última llamada para Diego Serrano | 3 July 2007 | 4,116,000 | 26.3% |

=== Seventh Season ===
| No. overall | No. in season | Title | Original air date | Viewers | Share |
|---|---|---|---|---|---|
| 125 | 1 | No sin mi hijo | 19 December 2007 | 4,027,000 | 23.0% |
| 126 | 2 | La intimidad es una puerta cerrada | 26 December 2007 | 4,580,000 | 26.9% |
| 127 | 3 | Sorpresa, sorpresa | 2 January 2008 | 3,687,000 | 20.4% |
| 128 | 4 | Mientras hay resquemor hay esperanza | 8 January 2008 | 3,200,000 | 16.3% |
| 129 | 5 | Cuando el amor llega así de esta manera | 15 January 2008 | 3,389,000 | 18.7% |
| 130 | 6 | Intima fémina | 22 January 2008 | 3,142,000 | 17.5% |
| 131 | 7 | Mayormente, lo que sube, baja | 29 January 2008 | 3,381,000 | 18.6% |
| 132 | 8 | Encontronazos y desencuentros | 5 February 2008 | 3,108,000 | 17.8% |
| 133 | 9 | El camino recto de Santa Justa | 12 February 2008 | 3,443,000 | 19.7% |
| 134 | 10 | ¡Pero por qué no te callas! | 19 February 2008 | 3,231,000 | 17.7% |
| 135 | 11 | Matar a un ruiseñor | 26 February 2008 | 3,713,000 | 20.0% |
| 136 | 12 | Papá cumple 50 años | 4 March 2008 | 3,145,000 | 21.7% |
| 137 | 13 | La procesión va por dentro | 11 March 2008 | 3,096,000 | 18.0% |
| 138 | 14 | El síndrome Sarkozy | 18 March 2008 | 2,895,000 | 18.3% |
| 139 | 15 | Al evitamiento por el alejamiento | 25 March 2008 | 3,069,000 | 18.0% |
| 140 | 16 | Los padres de ella | 1 April 2008 | 3,308,000 | 18.9% |

=== Eighth Season ===
| No. overall | No. in season | Title | Original air date | Viewers | Share |
|---|---|---|---|---|---|
| 141 | 1 | Bienvenido al mundo Serrano | 5 June 2008 | 3,774,000 | 21.4% |
| 142 | 2 | La parienta, la cuñada, la suegra y Diego | 12 June 2008 | 3,630,000 | 21.0% |
| 143 | 3 | Tiburón V | 19 June 2008 | 3,383,000 | 21.6% |
| 144 | 4 | La carta de Pandora | 26 June 2008 | 3,191,000 | 19.0% |
| 145 | 5 | Vente pa' mi casa Fiti | 3 July 2008 | 2,955,000 | 19.9% |
| 146 | 6 | Divorcio a la Serrana | 10 July 2008 | 3,276,000 | 23.8% |
| 147 | 7 | Desmontando a Diego | 17 July 2008 | 3,580,000 | 25.6% |

== Awards and nominations ==
- Atv Awards
  - 2004: Best Actor (Antonio Resines)—WON
  - 2004: Best Direction—Nominated
  - 2004: Best Fiction Program—Nominated
- Fotogramas de Plata
  - 2004: Best TV Actor (Antonio Resines)—WON
  - 2004: Best TV Actress (Belén Rueda)—Nominated
- Ondas Awards
  - 2004: Best Series—WON
- Spanish Actors Union
  - 2006: Television: Lead Performance, Female (Belén Rueda)—Nominated
  - 2006: Television: Performance in a Minor Role, Female (Alexandra Jiménez)—Nominated
  - 2005: Television: Lead Performance, Male (Antonio Resines)—Nominated
  - 2005: Television: Supporting Performance, Male (Antonio Molero)—Nominated
  - 2004: Television: Lead Performance, Male (Antonio Resines)—Nominated
  - 2004: Television: Performance in a Minor Role, Male (Manolo Caro)—Nominated
  - 2004: Television: Supporting Performance, Male (Jesús Bonilla)—Nominated
  - 2004: Television: Supporting Performance, Male (Antonio Molero)—Nominated
- TP de Oro
  - 2004: Best Actor (Antonio Resines)—Nominated
  - 2004: Best Actress (Belén Rueda)—Nominated
  - 2004: Best National Series—Nominated
- Zapping Awards
  - 2004: Best Actor (Antonio Resines)—WON
  - 2004: Best Actress (Belén Rueda)—Nominated

== Adaptations ==
Los Serrano was adapted for Greek television as Eftyhismenoi Mazi (Greek: Ευτυχισμένοι μαζί, English:Happy Together) and aired in Mega Channel during the seasons 2007–08 and 2008–09. It was awarded as the best comedy series in "Prosopa" Greek Television Awards for the season 2008–09, and was one of the most successful series and according to television ratings, it was being watched by over 2.000.000 spectators every week. Popular actors Giannis Bezos and Katerina Lehou had the lead roles.

I Cesaroni in Italy is also based on the format.
