= Natalia Sánchez (actress) =

Spanish actress, singer (b. 1990)

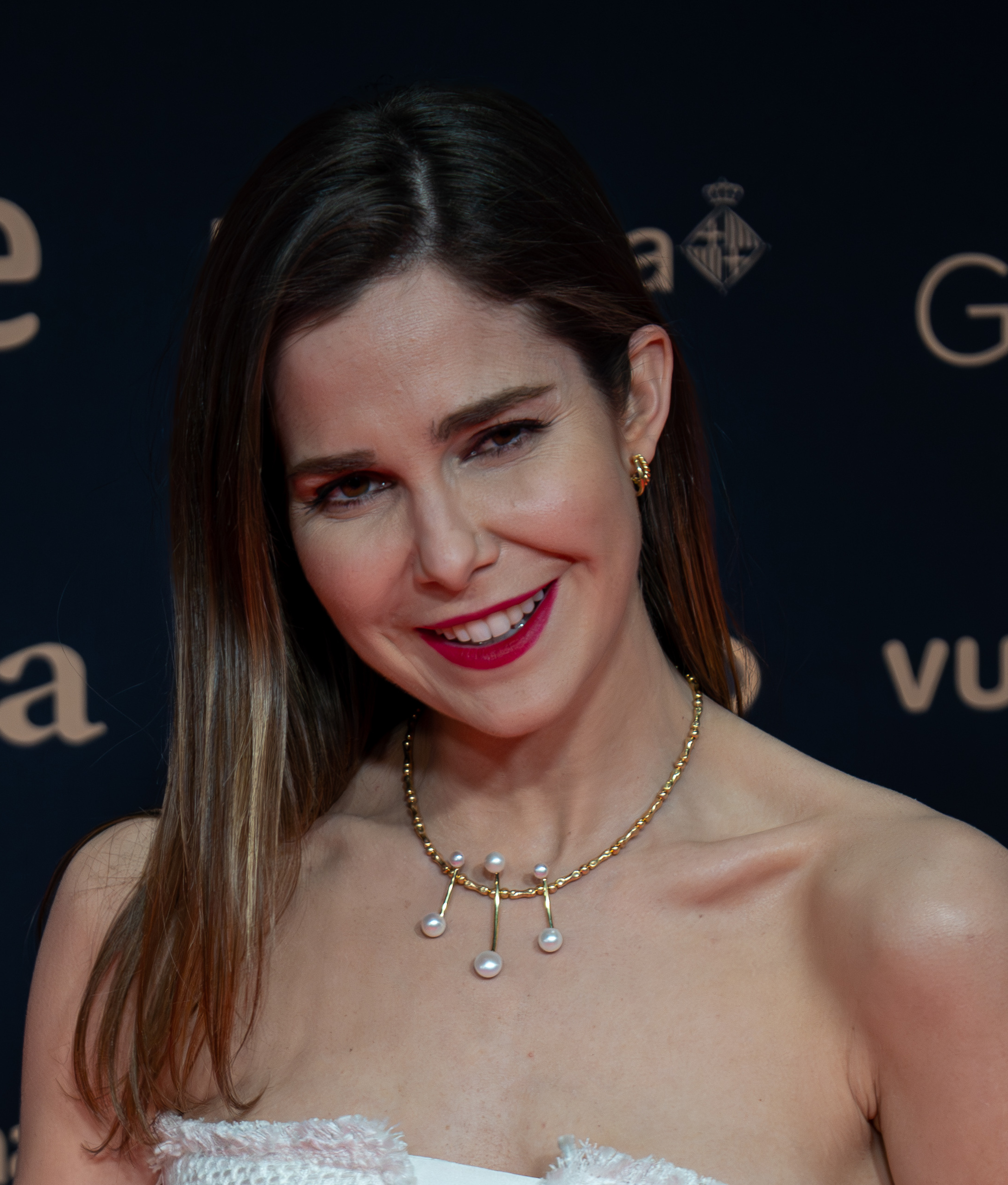
- Sánchez in 2026
- Born: Natalia Sánchez Molina; March 27, 1990 (age 36); Madrid, Spain
- Occupations: Actress; singer
- Years active: 2001–present
- Partner(s): Víctor Elías (2005–2012); Marc Clotet (2013–present)
- Children: 2

Natalia Sánchez Molina (born 27 March 1990) is a Spanish actress and singer, who is best known for portraying María Teresa "Teté" Capdevila Gómez on hit television Los Serrano.

== Life and career ==
Natalia Sánchez Molina was born on 27 March 1990 in Madrid. She has an older sister named Sandra. Sánchez speaks Spanish, English, Catalan, and French.

In 2004, Sánchez filmed a television commercial for El Corte Inglés with the rest of the main actors of Los Serrano.

From 2005 to 2012, Sánchez was in a relationship with Víctor Elías, her co–star from Los Serrano.

Since 2013, she has been in a relationship with Spanish actor Marc Clotet. They have two children: a daughter born in January 2019 and a son born in May 2020.

== Filmography ==
=== Movies ===
| Year | Title | Role | Notes |
|---|---|---|---|
| 2001 | Clara y Elena | Girl | |
| 2003 | Dum Dum | Natalia | Short film |
| 2004 | Hipnos | Girl | |
| 2006 | Los aires difíciles | Charo | |
| 2007 | The Totenwackers | Raquel | |
| 2010 | I.D | Celia | Short film |
| 2015 | Fuera de Campo | Nuria | Short film |
| 2018 | El año de la plaga | Bego | |

=== Television ===
| Year | Title | Role | Notes |
|---|---|---|---|
| 2002 | Compañeros | Vero | 1 episode |
| 2002 | Periodistas | Claudia | 1 episode |
| 2003 | Javier ya no vive solo | Inés | 1 episode |
| 2003–08 | Los Serrano | María Teresa "Teté" Capdevila Gómez | 147 episodes |
| 2004 | Un lugar en el mundo | Natalia | 2 episodes |
| 2005 | Los recuerdos de Alicia | Alicia | TV movie |
| 2009 | Acusados | Marina Domènech Ballester | 10 episodes |
| 2009 | La ira | Carolina | 2 episodes |
| 2011 | La duquesa II | Eugenia Martínez de Irujo, 12th Duchess of Montoro | TV movie |
| 2011 | Ángel o demonio | Nuria | 1 episode |
| 2011–12 | Amar en tiempos revueltos | Cecilia Armenteros Marín | 210 episodes |
| 2012 | La memoria del agua | Amada Montemayor | 2 episodes |
| 2016 | ¿Qué fue de Jorge Sanz? | | 1 episode |
| 2019 | Hospital Valle Norte | Juana Martínez | 10 episodes |
| 2019 | Por amar sin ley | | 1 episode |
| 2022 | Heirs to the Land | Marta Destorrent | 8 episodes |

== Discography ==
=== Santa Justa Klan ===
==== Albums ====
- 2006: Santa Justa Klan (album)
- 2007: DPM (album)

==== Singles ====
- 2006: "A Toda Mecha"
- 2006: "De 1 Al 10"
- 2007: "Con Angelina Jolie Se Me Va La Olla"
