= Periodistas (TV series) =

- Genre: Drama
- Country of origin: Spain
- Original language: Spanish
- No. of seasons: 9
- No. of episodes: 119

Production
- Executive producers: Daniel Écija; Felipe Pontón
- Production company: Globomedia

Original release
- Network: Telecinco
- Release: 13 January 1998 – 8 July 2002

Periodistas (lit. 'Journalists') is a Spanish drama television series set in the editorial office of a newspaper. Produced by Globomedia and starring, among others, José Coronado, Amparo Larrañaga, Álex Angulo, Alicia Borrachero, Esther Arroyo and Belén Rueda, its 9 seasons originally aired from 1998 to 2002 on Telecinco. Its success in Spain generalised a wave of series set in professional environments.

== Premise ==
The series revolves around the Crónica Universal, a fictional newspaper from Madrid, accounting for both the journalists' ups and downs of street work as well as their personal inter-relationships in the day-to-day at the editorial office. The fiction kicks off with Luis Sanz (José Coronado) joining the newspaper as head of the Local section, covering the post left vacant by Laura Maseras (Amparo Larrañaga), who has been promoted to the post of deputy editor of the newspaper.

== Cast ==
- José Coronado, as Luis Sanz, editor-in-chief of the newspaper's local events section .
- Amparo Larrañaga as Laura Maseras, deputy editor of the newspaper.
- Alicia Borrachero as Ana Ruiz, radical and feminist journalist.
- Álex Angulo as Blas Castellote, vocational journalist.
- Enric Arredondo, as Pablo Serrano, the editor of the newspaper.
- Joel Joan as Willy Casals, photographer.
- Belén Rueda as Clara Nadal, photographer.
- Adriana Ozores as Pilar, Luis Sanz's wife.
- María Pujalte, Mamen Tébar, editorial secretary, girlfriend of Blas.
- Esther Arroyo as Alicia Rocha.
- Pepón Nieto as José Antonio Aranda, an intern at the newspaper.
- Elena Ballesteros as Isabel Sanz, Luis Sanz's daughter, an intern at the newspaper.
- Miryam Gallego as Claudia Montero, intern at the newspaper.
- Paco Marín as Chusky.
- Jesús Bonilla as Vicente Zamora.
- Ginés García Millán, as Álvaro.
- Enrique Arce as Eduardo Cabrera.
- Isabel Aboy as Berta Rocha, an intern at the newspaper.
- Unax Ugalde as Óscar.
- Miguel Ortiz as Chopo.
- Santi Millán as Pep Portabella.

== Production and release ==
The Bar "La Tertulia" in which the characters often met after work is actually located on the corner of Calle Barquillo and Fernando VI, in Madrid.

Produced by Globomedia, the series premiered on 13 January 1998. The broadcasting run, consisting of 9 seasons and 119 episodes, ended on 8 July 2002. The series enjoyed success in terms of audience, attracting more than 4.5 million viewers per episode on a regular basis as well as consistently breaking the 25% share mark.
