= 2023 Paraguayan general election =

- 30 April 2023
- Presidential election
- Turnout: 63.29% (▲2.05pp)
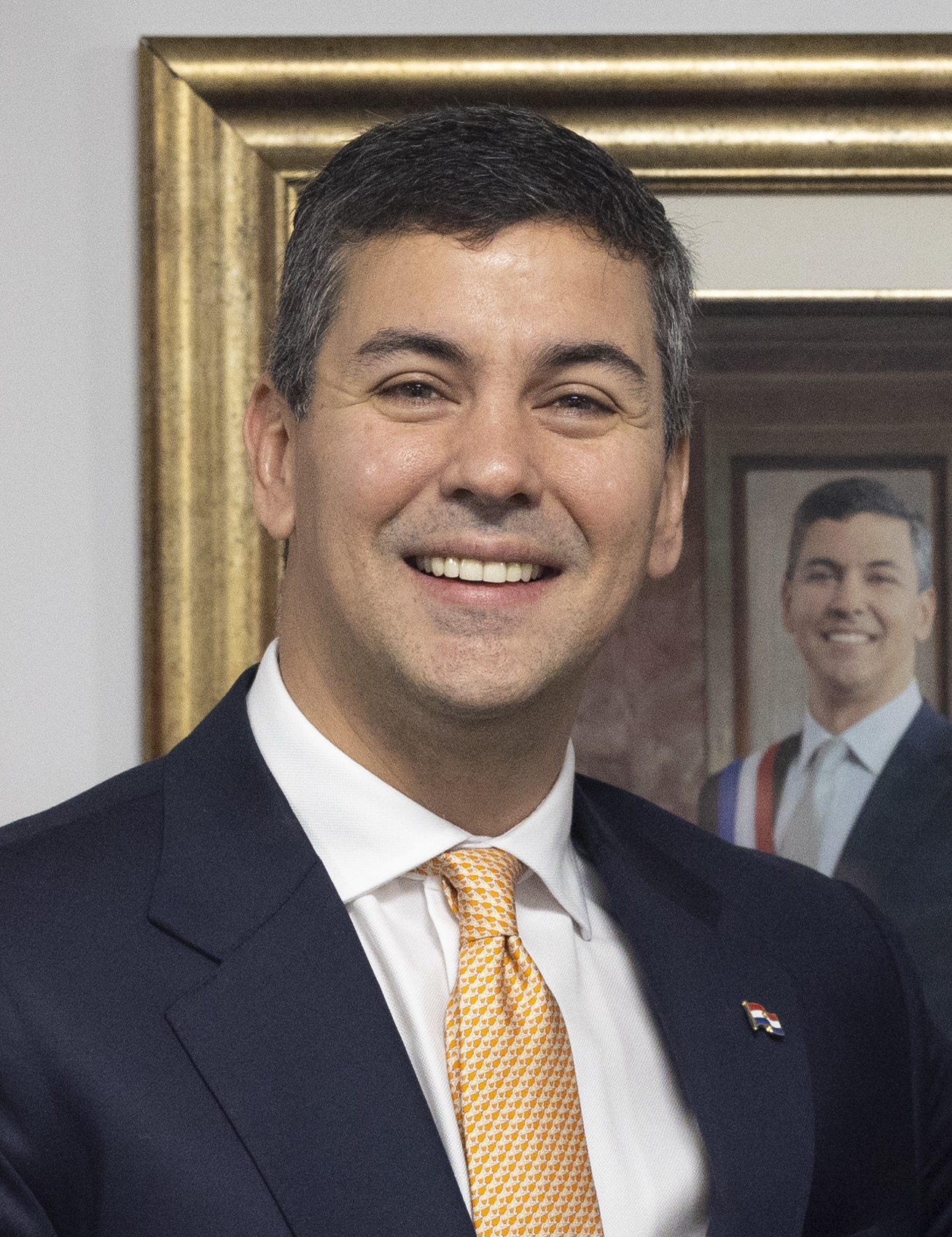

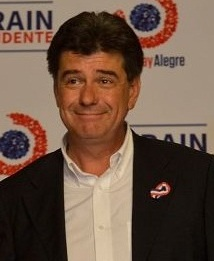

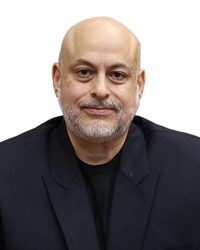
Candidate	Santiago Peña	Efraín Alegre	Paraguayo Cubas
Party	Colorado	PLRA	PCN
Alliance	–	Concertación	–
Running mate	Pedro Alliana	Soledad Núñez	Stilber Valdez
Popular vote	1,291,209	830,302	692,429
Percentage	43.93%	28.25%	23.56%
President before election
Mario Abdo Benítez
Colorado
Elected President
Santiago Peña
Colorado
- Parliamentary election
- All 80 seats in the Chamber of Deputies; All 45 seats in the Senate
Party	Leader	Vote %	Seats	+/–
Chamber of Deputies (41 seats for a majority)
Colorado	Santiago Peña	47.43	48	+6
PLRA	Efraín Alegre	19.66	17	0
PCN	Paraguayo Cubas	8.24	4	+3
CN2023	Efraín Alegre	7.80	6	New
PPQ	Sebastián Villarejo	3.27	1	−2
PEN	Fernando Camacho	2.94	2	0
Yo Creo	Miguel Prieto	2.33	2	New
Senate (23 seats needed for a majority)
Colorado	Santiago Peña	45.73	23	+6
CN2023	Efraín Alegre	24.35	12	New
PCN	Paraguayo Cubas	11.50	5	+4
PEN	Fernando Camacho	5.15	2	0
PPQ	Sebastián Villarejo	2.51	1	−2
Guasú Front	Fernando Lugo	2.11	1	−5
Yo Creo	Miguel Prieto	1.95	1	New
This lists parties that won seats. See the complete results below.

General elections were held in Paraguay on 30 April 2023 to elect the president, vice president, National Congress, and departmental governors. The incumbent president Mario Abdo Benítez and vice president Hugo Velázquez Moreno, both of the Colorado Party, were ineligible for re-election.

The Colorado candidate, former Finance Minister Santiago Peña, defeated both PLRA president Efraín Alegre from the Concertación alliance and former senator Paraguayo Cubas from the populist National Crusade Party. The election marked another victory for the long-dominant Colorado Party, which also won the majority of congressional and governor races.

Both Peña and the vice president-elect Pedro Alliana took office on 15 August 2023. Peña would serve as president until he was impeached and removed from power on 6 November 2026 during that year's banking crisis, and Alliana succeeded him as president afterwards.

== Electoral system ==
The president of Paraguay is elected in one round of voting by plurality. The 80 members of the Chamber of Deputies are elected by closed list proportional representation in 18 multi-member constituencies, based on the departments. The 45 members of the Senate are elected from a single national constituency using closed list proportional representation.

== Candidates ==
Candidates in the 2023 Paraguayan general election
List	Ticket	Candidates	
List	Ticket	President	Vice President
1	Colorado Party	Santiago Peña	Pedro Alliana
3	Concertación for a New Paraguay	Efraín Alegre	Soledad Núñez
7	National Union of Ethical Citizens	Jorge Humberto Gómez	Noelia Núñez
10	New Republic Movement	Euclides Acevedo	Jorge Querey
14	Humanist and Solidary Movement	Juan Félix Romero	Catalina Ramírez
15	Unámonos National Party	Luis Talavera	Celso Álvarez
21	Party of the Youth	José Luis Chilavert	Sofia Scheid
23	Green Party Paraguay	Óscar Cañete	Luis Wilfrido Arce
30	National Party of the People 30A	Prudencio Burgos	Leona Guaraní
33	Citizen Patriotic Coordinator Movement	Alfredo Machuca	Justina Noguera
45	Herederos Democratic Socialist Party	Rosa Bogarín	Herminio Lesme
777	Únete Paraguay	Aurelio Martínez Cabral	David Sánchez N.
911	National Crusade	Paraguayo Cubas	Stilber Valdez
Source: TREP

== Campaign ==
The campaign issues included Paraguay's relationship with Taiwan, allegations of corruption, and the state of the economy. Santiago Peña was supportive of maintaining ties with Taiwan, whereas Efraín Alegre criticized the country's ties to Taiwan and argued for opening up relations with China.

Peña previously ran in the 2017 Colorado presidential primaries but had lost to Mario Abdo Benítez, who went on to win the 2018 presidential election against Alegre. Peña was an economist at Paraguay's central bank before joining the International Monetary Fund in Washington, D.C. He was described to Reuters as "clean-cut", "decent", and having "good ideas". Peña is a protégé of former president Horacio Cartes, who has been sanctioned by the United States due to being "significantly corrupt". Peña pledged to pursue "business friendly" policies, including a focus on job creation, low taxation, and attracting foreign investment into the country. Peña stated he would preserve relations with Taiwan and would move the country's embassy in Israel from Tel Aviv to Jerusalem, a move previously made by Cartes in 2018, but reversed by Abdo Benítez later that year.

Alegre previously ran for president in the 2013 and 2018 general elections. He campaigned by criticizing the Colorado Party and accusing them of corruption. Alegre pledged to reassess the country's relationship with Taiwan, with a preference towards establishing diplomatic ties with China, with the goal of Paraguay gaining access to China's market for cattle and soy. Alegre pledged to cut public sector red tape and proposed a "new energy policy" with a focus on the Itaipu Dam and Yacyretá Dams (shared with Brazil and Argentina respectively), stating that Paraguay should utilize the energy generated for national development, rather than sell the power.

Populist, anti-establishment candidate Paraguayo "Payo" Cubas is a former senator, who described himself as a "romantic, republican and nationalist anarchist". Cubas was expelled from the Senate on 28 November 2019 following an incident in Alto Paraná Department that included the assault of police officers, damage to public property and calling for the killing of "100,000 brasiguayos", Paraguayans of Brazilian descent, leading to his impeachment from the senate. He campaigned to introduce the death penalty in specific cases, such as femicide, child rape, drug trafficking, parricide, murder in cases of robbery, and stealing from the Treasury, which would require a modification to Paraguay's constitution. Cubas proposed involving the Armed Forces of Paraguay in the government, and expanding the powers of the president over those of the parliament, describing the latter as a "den of thugs". Cubas has been likened by Leandro Lima of Control Risks to other right-wing populist figures from the Americas, including Donald Trump, Jair Bolsonaro, and Javier Milei.

== Opinion polls ==
Opinion polling in the 2023 Paraguayan general election
Polling Firm	Publishment Date	Santiago Peña ANR–PC	Efraín Alegre PLRA	Euclides Acevedo MNR	José Luis Chilavert PJ	Paraguayo Cubas PCN	Others	Don't know	None
AtlasIntel	25 April 2023	32.8%	34.3%	3.0%	1.2%	23.0%	1.4%	1.9%	2.4%
Datos	10 April 2023	35.5%	40.6%	1.9%		12.6%	0.9%		8.5%
AtlasIntel	5 April 2023	36.4%	38.1%	2.8%	2.1%	14.5%	1.1%	3.5%	1.5%
AtlasIntel	15 March 2023	36.1%	38.2%	2.7%	2.9%	14.3%	0.9%	4.2%	0.8%
FaSaC Consultores	10 March 2023	42.8%	32.1%	6.1%	2.1%	13.7%		1.7%	1.5%
GEO	27 February 2023	35.3%	39.7%	5.8%	0.7%	10.3%		8.2%	
Datos	24 February 2023	30.5%	33.6%	3.3%		10.4%	0.9%	20.1%	1.2%
FaSaC Consultores	20 February 2023	41.3%	28.3%	9.5%	3.5%	13.9%		2%	1.5%
GEO	20 February 2023	35.2%	38.9%	6.0%	0.8%	10.4%		9%	8.7%
Ati Snead	6 February 2023	46.2%	24.9%	6.5%	1.2%	4.2%		9%	8%
OIMA	2 February 2023	42%	19%	7%	4%	12%		10%	6%

=== Pre-election polling ===
Pre-election polling in the 2023 Paraguayan general election
Polling Firm	Fieldwork date	Peña ANR–PC	Velázquez ANR–PC	Alegre PLRA	Acevedo TBA	González PEN	Villarejo PPQ	Cubas PCN	Martínez FG-Ñ	Núñez Ind	Burt PLRA	Chilavert Ind	Fleitas PLRA	Don't know/ No response	None of the above
FaSaC Consultores	20 September 2022	32.2%	—N/a	22.1%	4.5%	—		11.8%	—			3.9%	—N/a	16.1%	9.4%
Ati Snead	8–15 June 2022	23.2%	14.0%	14.3%	9.9%	9.7%	4.3%	2.9%	2.0%	2.0%	1.9%	1.1%	1.0%	9.0%	4.8%
GEO	27 May – 10 June 2022	35.3%	—N/a	37.5%	—									13.4%	13.8%
GEO	27 May – 10 June 2022	—N/a	28.2%	37.1%	—									18.5%	16.3%

== Results ==
=== President ===
The presidential election was won by Santiago Peña of the Colorado Party.

Candidate	Running mate	Party	Votes	%
Santiago Peña	Pedro Alliana	Colorado Party	1,291,209	43.93
Efraín Alegre	Soledad Núñez	National Coalition for a New Paraguay	830,302	28.25
Paraguayo Cubas	Stilber Valdez	National Crusade Party	692,429	23.56
Euclides Acevedo	Jorge Querey	New Republic Movement	41,164	1.40
José Luis Chilavert	Sofia Scheid	Party of the Youth	24,259	0.83
Luis Talavera Alegre	Celso Álvarez	Unámonos National Party	17,328	0.59
Jorge Humberto Gómez	Noelia Núñez	National Union of Ethical Citizens	12,066	0.41
Juan Félix Romero	Catalina Ramírez	Humanist and Solidarity Movement	5,869	0.20
Rosa María Bogarín	Herminio Lesme	Herederos Democratic Socialist Party	5,266	0.18
Prudencio Burgos	Leona Guaraní	National Party of the People 30A	5,258	0.18
Alfredo Luis Machuca	Justina Noguera	Citizen Patriotic Coordinator Movement	5,204	0.18
Óscar Mauricio Cañete	Luis Wilfrido Arce	Green Party Paraguay	4,847	0.16
Aurelio Martínez	David Sánchez	Únete Paraguay	3,866	0.13
Total			2,939,067	100.00
Valid votes			2,939,067	97.29
Invalid votes			13,694	0.45
Blank votes			68,288	2.26
Total votes			3,021,049	100.00
Registered voters/turnout			4,773,427	63.29
Source: TSJE

=== Senate ===
The following table shows the distribution of seats in the Senate. The status of at least one seat remains in doubt, however, as Rafael "Mbururú" Esquivel, elected for the National Crusade Party, was arrested and charged with child sexual abuse just before the elections.

Party	Votes	%	Seats	+/–
Colorado Party	1,319,617	45.73	23	+6
Alliance of Senators for the Fatherland	702,776	24.35	12	New
National Crusade Party	331,945	11.50	5	+4
National Encounter Party	148,505	5.15	2	+2
Beloved Fatherland Party	72,357	2.51	1	–2
Guasú Front	60,774	2.11	1	–5
I Believe	56,386	1.95	1	New
New Republic Movement	44,704	1.55	0	New
National Union of Ethical Citizens	30,545	1.06	0	–1
National Patriotic Alliance Union	24,471	0.85	0	New
Unámonos National Party	16,634	0.58	0	New
Party of the Youth	15,636	0.54	0	New
Liberty and Republic Party	14,481	0.50	0	New
Humanist and Solidarity Movement	12,627	0.44	0	New
National Party of the People 30A	12,281	0.43	0	New
Dreamt Fatherland Party	7,644	0.26	0	New
Citizen Patriotic Coordinator Movement	7,612	0.26	0	New
Herederos Democratic Socialist Party	6,661	0.23	0	New
Total	2,885,656	100.00	45	0
Valid votes	2,885,656	95.55		
Invalid votes	13,706	0.45		
Blank votes	120,825	4.00		
Total votes	3,020,187	100.00		
Registered voters/turnout	4,772,196	63.29		
Source: TSJE - Resultados Definitivos

==== Elected senators ====
Name	Party	Alliance	Votes
Antonio Rubén Velázquez Chamorro	National Democratic Consciousness	I Believe	18,485
Arnaldo Samaniego González	Colorado Party	Colorado Party	35,022
Basilio Gustavo Núñez Giménez	Colorado Party	Colorado Party	31,631
Blanca Margarita Ovelar de Duarte	Colorado Party	Colorado Party	17,864
Carlos Alcibíades Giménez Díaz	Colorado Party	Colorado Party	33,729
Carlos Núñez Agüero	Colorado Party	Colorado Party	54,498
Celeste Josefina Amarilla de Boccia	Authentic Radical Liberal Party	Senators for the Homeland Alliance	42,207
Derlis Ariel Alejandro Osorio Nunes	Colorado Party	Colorado Party	57,361
Derlis Hernán Maidana Zarza	Colorado Party	Colorado Party	76,066
Dionisio Oswaldo Amarilla Guirland	Authentic Radical Liberal Party	Senators for the Homeland Alliance	24,880
Édgar Idalino López Ruiz	Authentic Radical Liberal Party	Senators for the Homeland Alliance	63,077
Eduardo Hirohito Nakayama Rojas	Authentic Radical Liberal Party	Senators for the Homeland Alliance	28,499
Enrique Riera Ecudero	Colorado Party	Colorado Party	23,598
Enrique Salyn Concepción Buzarquis Cáceres	Authentic Radical Liberal Party	Senators for the Homeland Alliance	125,096
Erico Galeano Segovia	Colorado Party	Colorado Party	27,977
Ernesto Javier Zacarías Irún	Colorado Party	Colorado Party	22,567
Esperanza Martínez de Portillo	Party of Citizen Participation	Guasú Ñemongeta Front	11,735
Éver Federico Villalba Benítez	Authentic Radical Liberal Party	Senators for the Homeland Alliance	37,734
Gustavo Alfredo Leite Gusinky	Colorado Party	Colorado Party	15,978
Hermelinda Alvarenga de Ortega	Authentic Radical Liberal Party	Senators for the Homeland Alliance	26,296
Hernán David Rivas Román	Colorado Party	Colorado Party	25,178
José Daniel Oviedo Antúnez	National Crusade Party	National Crusade Party	18,100
José Gregorio Ledesma Narváez	Authentic Radical Liberal Party	Senators for the Homeland Alliance	25,241
Juan Carlos Baruja Fernández	Colorado Party	Colorado Party	71,867
Juan Eudes Afara Maciel	Colorado Party	Colorado Party	21,302
Kattya Mabel González Villanueva	National Encounter Party	Alliance National Encounter	100,155
Líder Santiago Amarilla Ríos	Authentic Radical Liberal Party	Senators for the Homeland Alliance	24,383
Lilian Graciela Samaniego González	Colorado Party	Colorado Party	54,750
Lourdes Noelia Cabrera Petters	Authentic Radical Liberal Party	Senators for the Homeland Alliance	22,312
Luis Alberto Pettengill Vacca	Colorado Party	Colorado Party	61,168
Mario Alberto Varela Cardozo	Colorado Party	Colorado Party	47,925
Natalicio Esteban Chase Acosta	Colorado Party	Colorado Party	30,165
Norma Beatriz Aquino Luraghi	National Crusade Party	National Crusade Party	12,637
Orlando Penner Durksen	Beloved Fatherland Party	Beloved Fatherland Party	14,185
Óscar Rubén Salomón Fernández	Colorado Party	Colorado Party	56,504
Patrick Paul Kemper Thiede	Hagamos Political Party	Alliance National Encounter	7,315
Pedro Alejandro Díaz Verón	Colorado Party	Colorado Party	23,059
Rafael Augusto Filizzola Serra	Progressive Democratic Party	Senators for the Homeland Alliance	28,251
Rafael Esquivel	National Crusade Party	National Crusade Party	51,443
Ramona Yolanda Paredes	National Crusade Party	National Crusade Party	141,102
Regina Lizarella Valiente Cabrera	Colorado Party	Colorado Party	56,047
Sergio Roberto Rojas Sosa	Authentic Radical Liberal Party	Senators for the Homeland Alliance	71,072
Silvio Adalberto Ovelar Benítez	Colorado Party	Colorado Party	282,237
Zenaida Concepción Delgado Benítez	National Crusade Party	National Crusade Party	12,859
Source: TSJE

=== Chamber of Deputies ===
The following table shows the distribution of seats in the Chamber of Deputies.

Party	Votes	%	Seats	+/–
Colorado Party	1,345,730	47.43	48	+6
National Crusade Party	233,812	8.24	4	+3
Alliance for Fatherland	221,383	7.80	6	New
Beloved Fatherland Party	92,874	3.27	1	–2
National Encounter Alliance	81,843	2.88	2	0
National Coalition for a New Paraguay Caaguazú	70,877	2.50	2	New
I Believe	66,126	2.33	2	New
Itapúa Departmental Coalition 2023	60,273	2.12	2	New
National Coalition for a New Paraguay Cordillera	59,752	2.11	2	New
National Coalition for a New Paraguay Alto Paraná	51,002	1.80	1	New
Departmental Coalition for a New San Pedro	47,265	1.67	2	New
Alliance for Asunción Deputies	46,382	1.63	1	New
Alliance for a New Paraguarí	36,667	1.29	1	New
National Coalition for a New Paraguay Concepción	36,247	1.28	1	New
Guasú Ñemongeta Front	33,254	1.17	0	0
National Union of Ethical Citizens	31,969	1.13	0	0
Alliance for a New Guairá	29,511	1.04	1	New
Authentic Radical Liberal Party	28,162	0.99	1	–
New Republic Movement	27,496	0.97	0	New
Misiones Departmental Coalition 2023	24,688	0.87	1	New
Party of the Youth	22,747	0.80	0	New
Canindeyú Alliance	22,081	0.78	1	New
Alliance for a New Caazapá	16,881	0.59	0	New
All Together Alliance for Ñeembucú	16,788	0.59	1	New
Alliance for a New Itapúa	15,240	0.54	0	New
Unámonos National Party	15,029	0.53	0	New
National Party of the People 30A	14,188	0.50	0	New
Citizen Patriotic Coordinator Movement	12,370	0.44	0	New
Liberty and Republic Party	10,200	0.36	0	New
Boquerón Alliance Unites Us	8,048	0.28	0	New
Alliance for a New President Hayes	7,906	0.28	0	New
Dreamt Fatherland Party	7,206	0.25	0	New
Let's go to Boquerón	6,974	0.25	0	New
Herederos Democratic Socialist Party	6,289	0.22	0	New
Humanist and Solidarity Movement	4,508	0.16	0	New
President Hayes Alliance for the Fatherland	4,174	0.15	0	New
National Coalition for a New Paraguay Alto Paraguay	3,317	0.12	0	New
Únete Paraguay	2,835	0.10	0	New
Capital Patriotic Union Alliance	2,732	0.10	0	New
Northern Popular Unity	2,571	0.09	0	New
Alliance Patriotic Union of San Pedro	2,066	0.07	0	New
New Air Political Movement for Alto Paraná	1,407	0.05	0	New
National Encounter Party	1,391	0.05	0	0
Cordillera Patriotic Union Alliance	1,388	0.05	0	New
Caazapá Patriotic Union Alliance	913	0.03	0	New
Tekojoja People's Party	850	0.03	0	0
Alliance Patriotic Union of Paraguarí	841	0.03	0	New
Green Party Paraguay	684	0.02	0	New
Alliance Patriotic Union of Concepción	613	0.02	0	New
Total	2,837,550	100.00	80	0
Valid votes	2,837,550	94.22		
Invalid votes	13,650	0.45		
Blank votes	160,551	5.33		
Total votes	3,011,751	100.00		
Registered voters/turnout	4,730,694	63.66		
Source: TSJE - Resultados Definitivos

==== Elected deputies ====
Name	Party	Alliance	Department	Votes
Adrián Darío Vaesken Vázquez	Authentic Radical Liberal Party	Alliance for the Homeland	Central	11,856
Alejandro Darío Aguilera Elizaur	Colorado Party	Colorado Party	Guairá	16,507
Alejo Ríos Medina	Authentic Radical Liberal Party	Coalition for a New Paraguay	Caaguazú	22,716
Ariel Villagra Sosa	Authentic Radical Liberal Party	Departmental Coalition for a New San Pedro	San Pedro	17,543
Arnaldo Agustín Valdez Noguera	Authentic Radical Liberal Party	Misiones Departamental Coalition 2023	Misiones	14,066
Arturo René Urbieta Cuevas	Colorado Party	Colorado Party	Concepción	17,084
Avelino Dávalos Estigarribia	Colorado Party	Colorado Party	Caazapá	28,923
Benjamín Cantero Ramírez	Colorado Party	Colorado Party	Canindeyú	13,579
Bettina Rosmary Aguilera Paniagua	Colorado Party	Colorado Party	Alto Paraná	27,250
Carlos Alberto Núñez Salinas	Colorado Party	Colorado Party	Central	27,242
Carlos Alberto Pereira Rieve	Authentic Radical Liberal Party	Itapúa Departmental Coalition 2023	Itapúa	25,134
Carlos Marcial Godoy García	Colorado Party	Colorado Party	Caaguazú	13,815
Carlos María Arrechea Ortiz	Colorado Party	Colorado Party	Misiones	31,587
Carlos María López López	Authentic Radical Liberal Party	Coalition for a New Paraguay	Cordillera	16,991
Carmen de Jesús Giménez de Ovando	Colorado Party	Colorado Party	San Pedro	20,773
César Ladislao Cerini Benítez	Colorado Party	Colorado Party	Itapúa	13,865
Christian Gabriel Brunaga Rotela	Colorado Party	Colorado Party	Itapúa	22,342
Cleto Marcelino Giménez Giménez	Authentic Radical Liberal Party	Canideyú Alliance	Canindeyú	10,534
Dalía Marlene Estigarribia	Authentic Radical Liberal Party	Alliance for the Homeland	Central	26,506
Daniel Fernando Centurión González	Colorado Party	Colorado Party	Distrito Capital	26,778
Del Pilar Vázquez Cabrera	Authentic Radical Liberal Party	Itapúa Departmental Coalition 2023	Itapúa	19,194
Derlis Manuel Rodríguez Báez	Colorado Party	Colorado Party	Caaguazú	23,982
Diego Crispín Candia Melgarejo	Colorado Party	Colorado Party	Central	15,083
Diosnel Aguilera Rojas	Authentic Radical Liberal Party	All Together Alliance for Ñeembucú	Ñeembucú	12,486
Édgar Gustavo Olmedo Silva	Colorado Party	Colorado Party	Caaguazú	22,850
Édgar Milciades Chávez Brizuela	Colorado Party	Colorado Party	Guairá	25,071
Emilio Pavón Doldán	Authentic Radical Liberal Party	Coalition for a New Paraguay	Concepción	14,334
Enrique Antonio Concepción Buzarquis Cáceres	Authentic Radical Liberal Party	Coalition for a New Paraguay	Caaguazú	19,892
Esteban Martín Samaniego Álvarez	Colorado Party	Colorado Party	Paraguarí	24,199
Eulalio Gomes	Colorado Party	Colorado Party	Amambay	20,290
Francisco Osvaldo Manuel Petersen Veiluva	Colorado Party	Colorado Party	Boquerón	10,443
Germán Solinger Santander	Colorado Party	Colorado Party	Itapúa	22,200
Gloria María Johana Vega Insfrán	Colorado Party	Colorado Party	Central	24,035
Graciela Aguilera Ruiz Díaz	Authentic Radical Liberal Party	Coalition for a New Paraguay	Cordillera	19,587
Guillermo Ariel Rodríguez Duré	National Democratic Consciousness	I Believe	Alto Paraná	23,414
Héctor Rubén Figueredo Notario	Colorado Party	Colorado Party	Paraguarí	23,421
Hilda María del Rocío Vallejo Ávalos	Beloved Fatherland Party	Beloved Fatherland Party	Distrito Capital	20,317
Hugo Joel Meza	Colorado Party	Colorado Party	Cordillera	26,895
Jatar Eduardo Fernández Safuán	National Crusade Party	National Crusade Party	Central	21,557
Jazmín Narváez Osorio	Colorado Party	Colorado Party	Central	37,541
Johanna Paola Ortega Ghiringhelli	Party for a Country of Solidarity	Alliance for Asunción Deputies	Distrito Capital	13,864
Jorge Ramón Ávalos Mariño	Authentic Radical Liberal Party	Alliance for a New Paraguarí	Paraguarí	18,115
Jorge Sebastián Barressi Mancia	Colorado Party	Colorado Party	San Pedro	19,736
José Domingo Adorno Mazacotte	Colorado Party	Colorado Party	Alto Paraguay	5,632
José Ramón Rodríguez Maciel	Colorado Party	Colorado Party	Distrito Capital	17,109
Juan Manuel Añazco Vera	Colorado Party	Colorado Party	Central	53,534
Juan Ramón Maciel Merlo	Colorado Party	Colorado Party	Caazapá	17,569
Leidy Paola Galeano Chávez	National Crusade Party	National Crusade Party	Central	13,939
Leonardo Saíz Arce	Colorado Party	Colorado Party	San Pedro	26,645
Liz Cristina Acosta Brítez	Colorado Party	Colorado Party	Alto Paraná	24,559
Luis Federico Benítez Cuevas	Colorado Party	Colorado Party	Ñeembucú	24,196
Luis Federico Franco Alfaro	Authentic Radical Liberal Party	Alliance for the Homeland	Central	22,748
Luis María González Vaesken	Colorado Party	Colorado Party	Alto Paraná	26,371
Marcelo Rafael Salinas González	Authentic Radical Liberal Party	Alliance for the Homeland	Central	34,041
María Constancia Benítez de Benítez	Authentic Radical Liberal Party	Alliance for a New Guairá	Guairá	20,032
María Cristina Villalba de Abente	Colorado Party	Colorado Party	Canindeyú	23,137
María Ida Cattebeke de Ortiz	Colorado Party	Colorado Party	Presidente Hayes	10,628
María Rocío Abed de Zacarías	Colorado Party	Colorado Party	Alto Paraná	21,017
Mauricio Fabián Espínola Núñez	Colorado Party	Colorado Party	Distrito Capital	22,607
Miguel Ángel del Puerto Silva	Colorado Party	Colorado Party	Caaguazú	26,053
Miguel Martínez Núñez	National Crusade Party	National Crusade Party	Alto Paraná	15,599
Néstor David Castellano Escobar	Colorado Party	Colorado Party	Central	17,684
Orlando Gabriel Arévalo Zielanko	Colorado Party	Colorado Party	Central	21,293
Pastor Alberto Vera Bejarano	Authentic Radical Liberal Party	Departmental Coalition for a New San Pedro	San Pedro	15,915
Patricia Alexandra Zena Oviedo	National Crusade Party	National Crusade Party	Central	13,826
Pedro José Gómez Silva	Authentic Radical Liberal Party	Alliance for the Homeland	Central	17,373
Pedro Ortiz Torres	Colorado Party	Colorado Party	Central	12,574
Ramón Juan Manuel Ayala Acevedo	Authentic Radical Liberal Party	Authentic Radical Liberal Party	Amambay	19,822
Raúl Antonio Benítez Talavera	National Encounter Party	Alliance National Encounter	Central	11,788
Raúl Luis Latorre Martínez	Colorado Party	Colorado Party	Distrito Capital	50,093
Roberto Eudez González Segovia	Colorado Party	Colorado Party	Cordillera	19,583
Rodrigo Daniel Blanco Amarilla	Authentic Radical Liberal Party	Alliance for the Homeland	Central	24,800
Rodrigo Daniel Gamarra Krayacich	Colorado Party	Colorado Party	Central	16,004
Roya Nigsa Torres Báez	Authentic Radical Liberal Party	Coalition for a New Paraguay	Alto Paraná	15,810
Rubén Antonio Roussillon Blaires	Colorado Party	Colorado Party	Presidente Hayes	18,566
Rubén Isaac Rubín Orrego	Hagamos Political Party	Alliance National Encounter	Central	22,264
Virina Mauricia Villanueva de Peña	Colorado Party	Colorado Party	Concepción	25,644
Walter Enrique Harms Céspedes	Colorado Party	Colorado Party	Itapúa	25,903
Walter Hugo García Méndez	National Democratic Consciousness	I Believe	Alto Paraná	12,663
Yamil Esgaib Mansia	Colorado Party	Colorado Party	Distrito Capital	10,954
Source: TSJE

=== Departmental governors ===
Department	Elected governor	Party	Votes	%	Margin	Result
Alto Paraguay	Arturo Méndez	Colorado	7,103	73.14	54.79	Hold
Alto Paraná	César Torres	Colorado	131,233	40.17	9.91	Hold
Amambay	Juancho Acosta	Colorado	34,268	47.02	4.41	Gain
Boquerón	Harold Bergen	Colorado	10,603	38.96	10.73	Hold
Caaguazú	Marcelo Soto	Colorado	113,106	51.77	18.54	Gain
Caazapá	Christian Acosta	Colorado	45,690	62.44	35.74	Hold
Canindeyú	Nelson Martínez	Colorado	46,094	57.65	32.15	Hold
Central	Ricardo Estigarribia	National Coalition	342,716	39.90	2.44	Gain
Concepción	Liz Meza	Colorado	44,298	45.47	0.03	Gain
Cordillera	Denis Lichi	Colorado	71.712	46.08	3.62	Gain
Guairá	Cesarito Sosa	Colorado	64,521	62.82	37.58	Hold
Itapúa	Javier Pereira	National Coalition	101,273	44.86	5.37	Gain
Misiones	Richard Ramírez	Colorado	40,316	58.61	24.35	Hold
Ñeembucú	Víctor Hugo Forneron	Colorado	27,030	56.07	21.71	Hold
Paraguarí	Norma Zárate de Monges	Colorado	71,868	59.39	32.96	Hold
Presidente Hayes	Bernardo Zárate	Colorado	29,528	57.75	30.30	Hold
San Pedro	Freddy D. Ecclesiis	Colorado	83,852	51.54	18.36	Hold
TREP

== Aftermath ==
Peña was congratulated by outgoing president Mario Abdo Benítez, and presidents Luiz Inácio Lula da Silva and Alberto Fernández of Brazil and Argentina, respectively. Peña also received congratulations from the Taiwanese ambassador in Asunción on behalf of Taiwanese president Tsai Ing-wen. Both Peña and his running mate Pedro Alliana were sworn in on 15 August 2023. At the age of 44, he will become the country's youngest president since the restoration of democracy in 1989, surpassing Abdo Benítez's record, who was 46 years old when he became president in 2018.

Cubas made allegations of electoral fraud, leading to protests by his supporters. He dubbed members of the Colorado Party "thieves" and called on citizens to resist the "usurpers". Election observers from the Organization of American States stated there was "no reason to doubt" the results of the election. Protesters set up roadblocks and clashed with police, resulting in 70 arrests following protests outside of the electoral court in Asunción. Alegre, who had conceded the election, called for a manual recount of votes and an international audit following the nationwide protests. On 5 May, Cubas was arrested in San Lorenzo, accused of breaching the peace.
