= Anti-establishment =

Opposition to the conventional social, political, and economic principles of a society

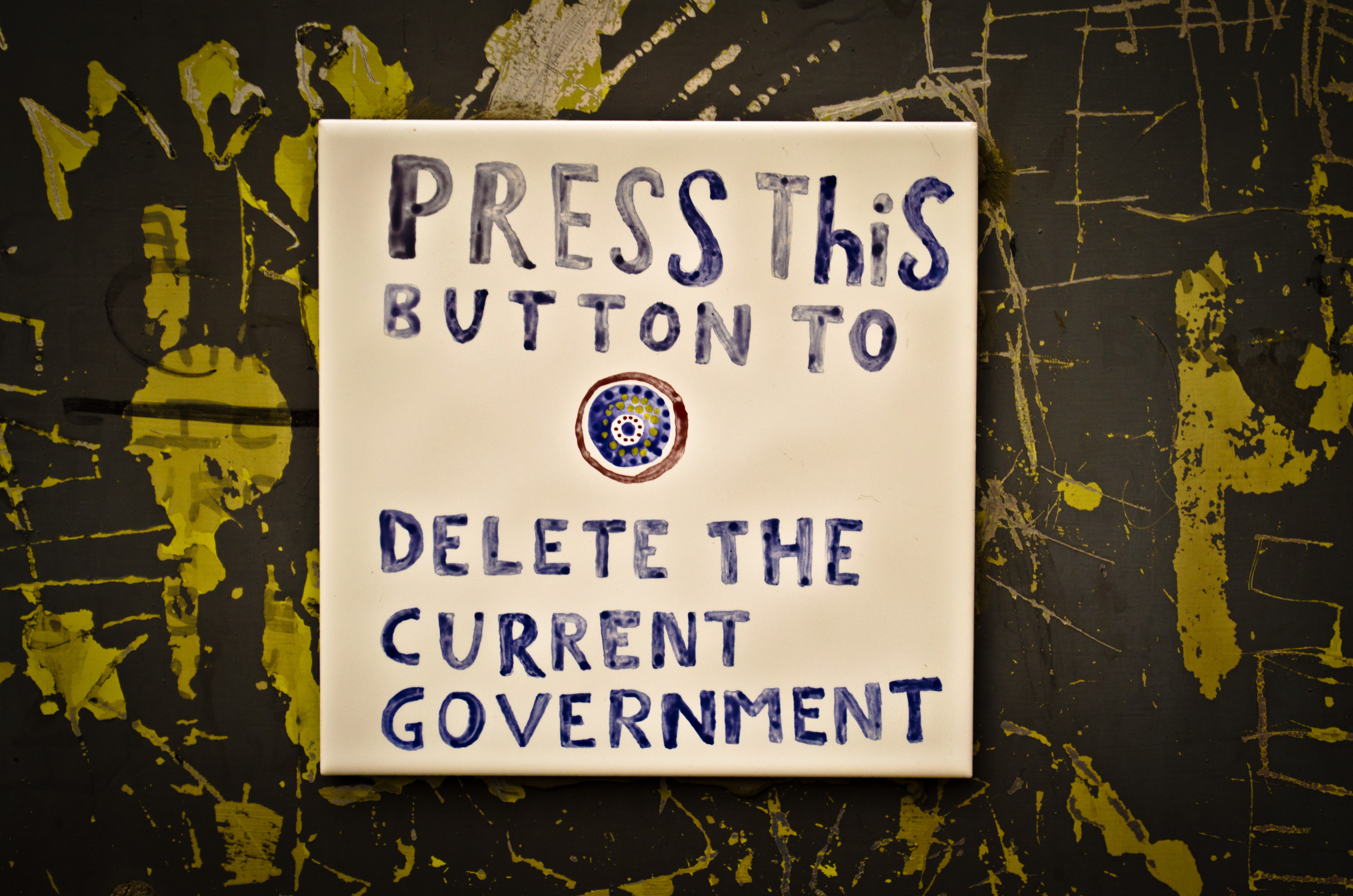
An anti-establishment sign at Lincoln's Inn Fields, London, in 2012

An anti-establishment view or belief is one which stands in opposition to the conventional social, political, and economic principles of a society. The term was first used in the modern sense in 1958 by the British magazine New Statesman to refer to its political and social agenda. Antiestablishmentarianism (or anti-establishmentarianism) is an expression for such a political philosophy. The growth of anti-establishment movements in the 21st century has been characterised as Neopopulism. Anti-establishment positions vary depending on political orientation. For example, during the protests of 1968, anti-establishment positions generally emerged from left-wing, socialist, and anarchist circles. In the 2010s, however, anti-establishment positions generally emerged from right-wing populist circles.

== By country ==
=== Argentina ===
The Libertad Avanza coalition—led by Javier Milei—has an ideology revolving anti-Peronism.

=== Australia ===
Pauline Hanson's One Nation Party and the United Australia Party (formerly Palmer United) have both been referred to as anti-establishment parties.

=== Canada ===
The People's Party of Canada (PPC) is seen as anti-establishment political party. PPC leader Maxime Bernier was accused by prominent Conservative politicians such as former prime ministers Stephen Harper and Brian Mulroney of trying to divide the political right. Bernier responded to Power and Politics that he wanted to focus on the disaffected voters stating that "there is 20 per cent of the population who do not even bother to vote that his party will debate discussions that "the leadership and the caucus" did not want to have when he was a party member.

=== Cyprus ===
The Direct Democracy Cyprus party has an anti-establishment movement. It was founded by former anti-party politician and YouTuber Fidias Panayiotou, who founded the party as a way to "change the political system in Cyprus".

=== Iceland ===
The Pirate Party of Iceland has an anti-establishment movement.

=== India ===
In India, the 1960s saw emergence of a group of writers who called themselves Hungryalists. They were the first anti-establishment and counter culture writers in Bengal whose dissenting voice drew attention of the government and court cases were filed against them. The main anti-establishment voices in Bengali literature have been Malay Roy Choudhury, Samir Roychoudhury, Subimal Basak, Falguny Roy and Tridib Mitra.

However, anti-establishment littlemag movement is still active both in Bangladesh and West Bengal.

=== Italy ===
The Five Star Movement (M5S) and the League are considered anti-establishment parties. The M5S led by Luigi Di Maio won the most votes in the 2018 Italian general election and formed the largest groups in the Chamber of Deputies and in the Senate. The center-right electoral alliance led by League's secretary Matteo Salvini won a pluralities of seats in both houses. The M5S and the League agreed to form a government coalition, which resulted in Giuseppe Conte being appointed Prime Minister and forming the 65th government of the Italian Republic.

Power to the People, a left-wing to far-left electoral alliance comprising several parties, organizations, associations, committees and social centers, is also an anti-establishment movement. In its manifesto, membership to Power to the People is described as "social and political, anti-liberist and anti-capitalist, communist, socialist, environmentalist, feminist, secular, pacifist, libertarian and southernist left-wing", whose goal as coalition is "to create real democracy, through daily practices, self-governance experiments, socialisation of knowing and popular participation". In the 2018 general election, they obtained 370,320 votes for the Chamber of Deputies (1.13%) and 319,094 votes for the Senate (1.05%), without electing any representatives.

=== Mexico ===
The election of Andrés Manuel López Obrador as President of Mexico was deemed as anti-establishment by pundits.

=== Paraguay ===
The National Crusade Party, founded and led by former senator Paraguayo Cubas, has anti-establishment elements within the party. In the 2023 general election, Cubas ended in third place in the presidential election—with almost 23% of the vote—while in the parliamentary election, the party became the third political force in both chambers.

=== United Kingdom ===
In the UK anti-establishment figures and groups are seen as those who argue or act against the ruling class. Examples of British anti-establishment satire include much of the humour of Peter Cook and Ben Elton; novels such as Rumpole of the Bailey; magazines such as Private Eye; and television programmes like Spitting Image, That Was The Week That Was, and The Prisoner (see also the satire boom of the 1960s). Anti-establishment themes also can be seen in the novels of writers such as Will Self.

However, by operating through the arts and media, the line between politics and culture is blurred, so that pigeonholing figures such as Banksy as either anti-establishment or counter-culture figures can be difficult. The tabloid newspapers such as The Sun, are less subtle, and commonly report on the sex-lives of the Royals simply because it sells newspapers, but in the process have been described as having anti-establishment views that have weakened traditional institutions. Conversely, as time passes, anti-establishment figures sometimes end up becoming part of the Establishment, as Mick Jagger, the Rolling Stones frontman, became a Knight in 2003, or when The Who lead vocalist Roger Daltrey was made a Commander of the Order of the British Empire in 2005 in recognition of both his music and his work for charity, as well as his June 2025 elevation to Knight Bachelor for services to music and charity.

=== United States ===
Individuals who were anti-establishment often spoke of "fighting the man", not wanting to be "selling out to the Establishment", and "tearing down the Establishment." Many well renowned activists and activist groups innovated great changes to society by standing up to the Establishment.

Samuel P. Huntington described the establishment as the coalition a president should establish upon being elected.

The President act[s]...with the support and cooperation of key individuals and groups in the executive office, the federal bureaucracy, Congress, and the more important businesses, banks, law firms, foundations, and media, which constitute the private sector's "Establishment."...The day after ...election, the size of his majority is almost — if not entirely — irrelevant to his ability to govern the country. What counts then is his ability to mobilize support from the leaders of key institutions in a society and government. ... This coalition must include key people in Congress, the executive branch, and the private-sector 'Establishment'.

==== Early usage ====
Anti-establishment in the United States began in the 1940s and continued through the 1950s.

Many World War II veterans, who had seen horrors and inhumanities, began to question every aspect of life, including its meaning. Urged to return to "normal lives" and plagued by post traumatic stress disorder (discussing it was "not manly"), in which many of them went on to found the outlaw motorcycle club Hells Angels. Some veterans, who founded the Beat Movement, were denigrated as Beatniks and accused of being "downbeat" on everything. Lawrence Ferlinghetti wrote a Beat autobiography that cited his wartime service.

Citizens had also begun to question authority, especially after the Gary Powers U-2 Incident, wherein President Eisenhower repeatedly assured people the United States was not spying on Russia, then was caught in a blatant lie. This general dissatisfaction was popularized by Peggy Lee's laconic pop song "Is That All There Is?", but remained unspoken and unfocused. It was not until the Baby Boomers came along in huge numbers that protest became organized.

==== 1960s ====
"Anti-establishment" became a buzzword of the tumultuous 1960s. Young people raised in comparative luxury saw many wrongs perpetuated by society and began to question "the Establishment". Contentious issues included the ongoing Vietnam War with no clear goal or end point, the constant military build-up and diversion of funds for the Cold War, perpetual widespread poverty being ignored, money-wasting boondoggles like pork barrel projects and the Space Race, festering race issues, a stultifying education system, repressive laws and harsh sentences for casual drug use, and a general malaise among the older generation. On the other side, "Middle America" often regarded questions as accusations, and saw the younger generation as spoiled, drugged-out, sex-crazed, unambitious slackers.

Anti-establishment debates were common because they touched on everyday aspects of life. Even innocent questions could escalate into angry diatribes. For example, "Why do we spend millions on a foreign war and a space program when our schools are falling apart?" would be answered with "We need to keep our military strong and ready to stop the Communists from taking over the world." As in any debate, there were valid and unsupported arguments on both sides. "Make love not war" invoked "America, love it or leave it."

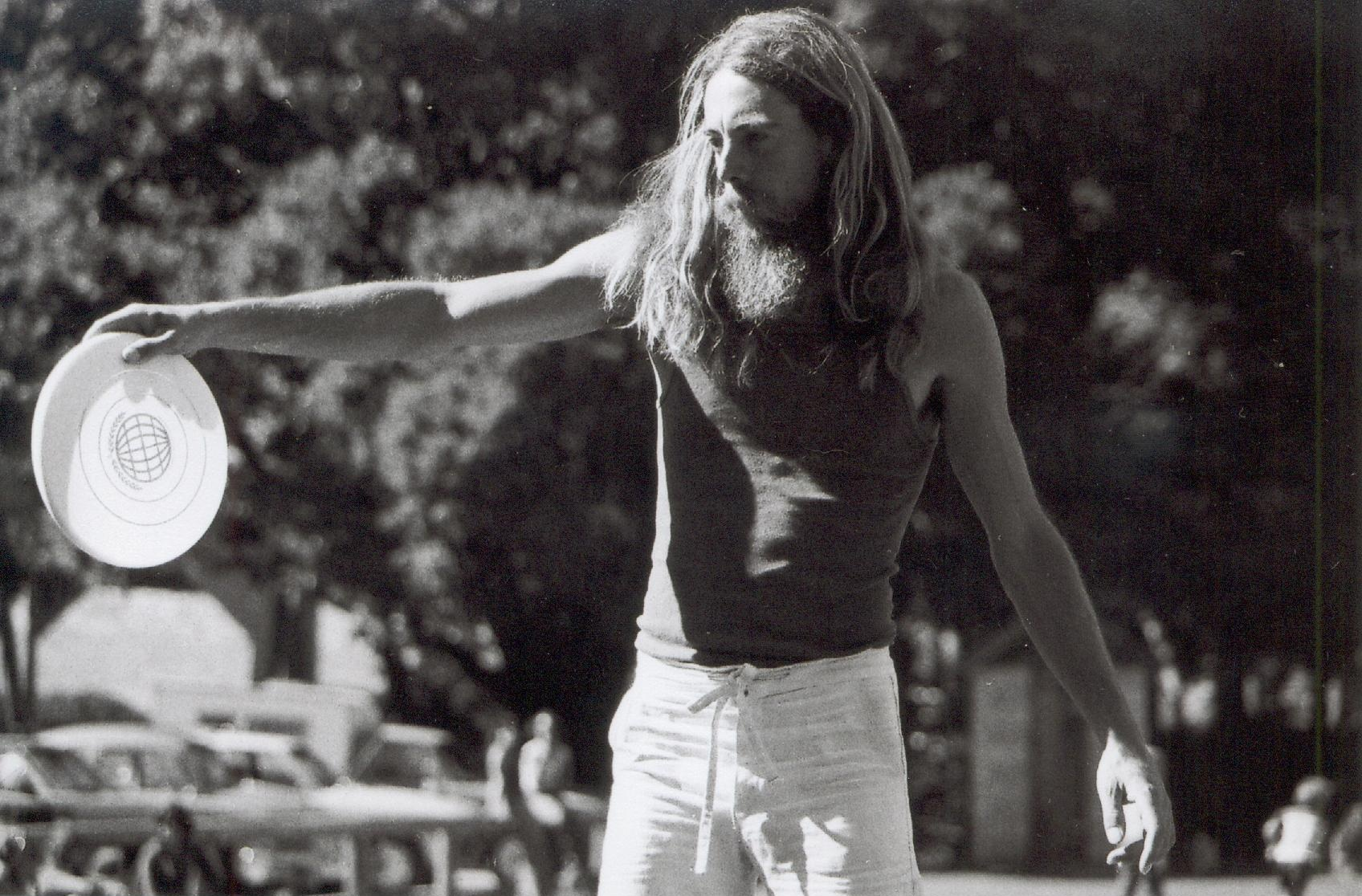
As a hippie, Ken Westerfield helped to popularize Frisbee as an alternative disc sport in the 1960s and 1970s.

As the 1960s simmered, the anti-Establishment adopted conventions in opposition to the Establishment. T-shirts and blue jeans became the uniform of the young because their parents wore collar shirts and slacks. The use of illegal drugs was favored over the legal consumption of alcohol. Promoting peace and love was the antidote to promulgating hatred and war. Living in genteel poverty was more "honest" than amassing a nest egg and a house in the suburbs. Rock 'n roll was played loudly over easy listening. Dodging the draft was passive resistance to traditional military service. Dancing was free-style, not learned in a ballroom. Over time, anti-establishment messages crept into popular culture: songs, fashion, movies, lifestyle choices, television.

The emphasis on freedom allowed previously hushed conversations about sex, politics, or religion to be openly discussed. A wave of radical liberation movements for minority groups came out of the 1960s, including second-wave feminism; Black Power, Red Power, and the Chicano Movement; and gay liberation. These movements differed from previous efforts to improve minority rights by their opposition to respectability politics and militant tone. Programs were put in place to deal with inequities: Equal Opportunity Employment, the Head Start Program, enforcement of the Civil Rights Act, busing, and others. But the widespread dissemination of new ideas also sparked a backlash and resurgence in conservative religions, new segregated private schools, anti-gay and anti-abortion legislation, and other reversals.

As the 1960s passed, society had changed to the point that the definition of the Establishment had blurred, and the term "anti-establishment" seemed to fall out of use.

==== 1960s to present: the use of anti-establishment rhetoric in American politics ====
Howard Zinn, in his bestseller titled A People's History of the United States mentions the concept of "establishment" several times in the book. In reference to the 1896 election and McKinley's victory, when talking about socialism in the early 20th century, a major WWI general strike in 1919, when writing about the aftermath of WWII, in the talk about the repression of a communist party organizer, in discussion of the 1963 March on Washington for Jobs and Freedom led by Martin Luther King Jr. and others, when writing about how even when black leaders were elected, they could not overcome the establishment and in reference to opposition in the Vietnam War, the establishment before and after the Watergate Scandal, the establishment from Jimmy Carter's Administration to George H.W.'s administration, the Iran-Contra Affair and the establishment, the maintaining of the military establishment even after the Cold War ended, the Vietnam Syndrome that leads to anti-establishment thought, and in a discussion of the 2000 election.

==== 1999 WTO protests, Occupy protests and anti-establishment thought ====
In 2011, with the rise of anti-austerity protests, online activism like Anonymous and the advent of the Occupy protests targeting the power of high finance and fighting for "the 99%," anti-establishment thought has reappeared. BBC News commented in one article that "The sinister Guy Fawkes mask made famous by the film V for Vendetta has become an emblem for anti-establishment protest groups." During the 1999 Seattle WTO protests the Earth Rainbow Network had (and still has) a page titled "The Anti-Establishment Files: Info and background material on the coming World Trade Organization meeting in Seattle."

==== Shift in usage ====
In recent years, with the rise of the populist right, the term anti-establishment has tended to refer to both left-wing and right-wing movements expressing dissatisfaction with mainstream institutions. For those on the right, this can be fueled by feelings of alienation from major institutions such as the government, corporations, media, and education system, which are perceived as holding progressive social norms, an inversion of the meaning formerly associated with the term. This can be accounted for by a perceived cultural and institutional shift to the left by many on the right. According to Pew Research, Western European populist parties from both sides of the ideological spectrum tapped into anti-establishment sentiment in 2017, "from the Brexit referendum to national elections in Italy".

Sarah Kendzior of QZ argued in 2016 that the term anti-establishment "has lost all meaning", citing a campaign video from then candidate Donald Trump titled "Fighting the Establishment". The term anti-establishment has tended to refer to right-wing populist movements, including nationalist movements and anti-lockdown protests, since Trump and the global populist wave, starting as far back as 2015 and as recently as 2021.

== See also ==
- Anti-war
- Conflict theories
- Elitism
- The Establishment
- Hungry generation
- Neo-nationalism
- New Left
- New Right
- Peace movement
- Populism
- Pro-democracy camp (Hong Kong)
- Protest
- Statism
- Anti-authoritarianism
- Political radicalism
