= President of Paraguay =

Head of state and government

President of the Republic of Paraguay
- Presidente de la República del Paraguay
- Standard of the president

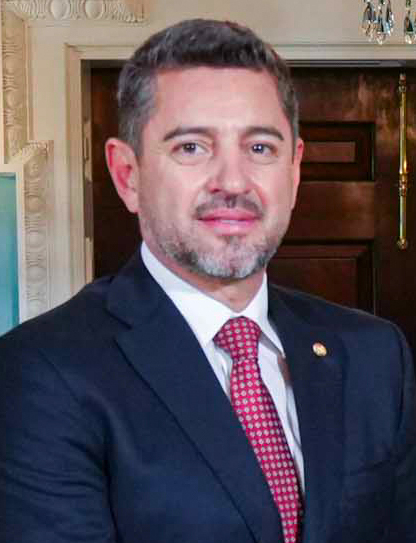
- Incumbent; Pedro Alliana since 6 November 2026
- Executive branch of the Government of Paraguay
- Style: His/Her Excellency Mr./Madam President of the Republic (Excelentísimo/a Señor/a Presidente/a de la República) (official); Mr./Madam President (Señor/a Presidente/a) (informal); The Most Excellent (Excelentísimo/a Señor/a) (diplomatic); His/Her Excellency (Su Excelencia) (diplomatic)
- Status: Head of state Head of government Commander-in-chief
- Residence: Mburuvicha Róga
- Seat: Palacio de los López, Asunción
- Appointer: Direct popular election
- Term length: Five years, non-renewable
- Constituting instrument: Constitution of Paraguay (1992)
- Formation: 13 March 1844 (182 years ago)
- First holder: Carlos Antonio López
- Deputy: Vice President of Paraguay
- Salary: 61,054,085 ₲ / US$8,587 monthly
- Website: www.presidencia.gov.py

The president of Paraguay (Spanish: presidente/a del Paraguay), officially known as the president of the Republic of Paraguay (Spanish: presidente de la República del Paraguay), is the head of the executive branch of the government of Paraguay, serving as both head of state and head of government according to the Constitution of Paraguay. His honorific title is Su Excelencia. The president is also the Commander-in-Chief for the armed forces.

Following the impeachment of Santiago Peña, the incumbent president of Paraguay is Pedro Alliana, who took office on 6 November 2026. The presidential seat is the Palacio de los López, in Asunción. The presidential residence is the Mburuvichá Roga, also in Asunción. Once presidents leave office, they are granted by the Constitution of Paraguay the speaking-but-non-voting position of senator for life.

== Features of the office ==
=== Requirements ===
Article 228 of the Constitution establishes that the president must be a naturalized citizen, be at least 35 years old, and have full political and civil rights.

=== Election ===
Article 230 of the Constitution establishes that the president and the vice president must be elected in a joint ticket by a single round of direct vote, in an election taking place between 90 and 120 days before the expiration of the previous presidential term (per Article 229, 15 August). Article 229 also establishes that the president serves a single term of 5 years and is forbidden to be re-elected under any circumstances, and that the vice president must resign from their role 6 months before the election, if they decide to run for the presidency.

The re-election ban dates back to the aftermath of the Alfredo Stroessner dictatorship, in which Stroessner was re-elected without term limits. An attempt by the Senate to abolish term limits on 1 April 2017 resulted in protests; it was ultimately rejected.

== Powers and duties ==
According to Article 238 of the Constitution, the president's duties are:

- Representing the State and directing the general administration of the country.
- Comply with and enforce the Constitution and its laws.
- Participating in the formation of laws.
- Veto laws passed by Congress.
- Issue decrees that require the endorsement of the Minister of the branch.
- Appoint and remove by itself the ministers of the Executive Branch, the Attorney General of the Republic and the officials of the Public Administration.
- The management of the foreign relations of the Republic.
- Report to Congress of the efforts carried out by the Executive Branch, as well as report on the general situation of the Republic and plans for the future.
- Being the Commander in Chief of the Nation's Armed Forces.
- Pardon or commute sentences imposed by the judges and courts of the Republic, and with a report from the Supreme Court of Justice.
- Convene extraordinary sessions of Congress.
- Proposing bills to Congress.
- Prepare and present the annual project of the General Budget of the Nation

== Succession ==
Article 234 of the Constitution establishes that in the event of impediment or absence of the offices of the President and Vice President, the Presidency of the Republic shall be assumed by, in order of succession, the President of the Senate, the President of the Chamber of Deputies, and the President of the Supreme Court of Justice.

== Residence ==
The Mburuvicha Róga in Asunción is the official residence of the president. It was first built in 1930.

The Palacio de los López is the president's workplace, located in the center of Asunción. It was first built in orders of Paraguay's first president Carlos Antonio López in 1844, and was planned to be handed to his son and designated successor, Francisco Solano López. It was completed in 1867, in the midst of the Paraguayan War, and thus it was never used by Solano López. The Palace was heavily damaged in the war, and it was not until 1894 that it was finally restored and repaired by Juan Bautista Egusquiza, who was the first president to establish the Palace as his official workplace.

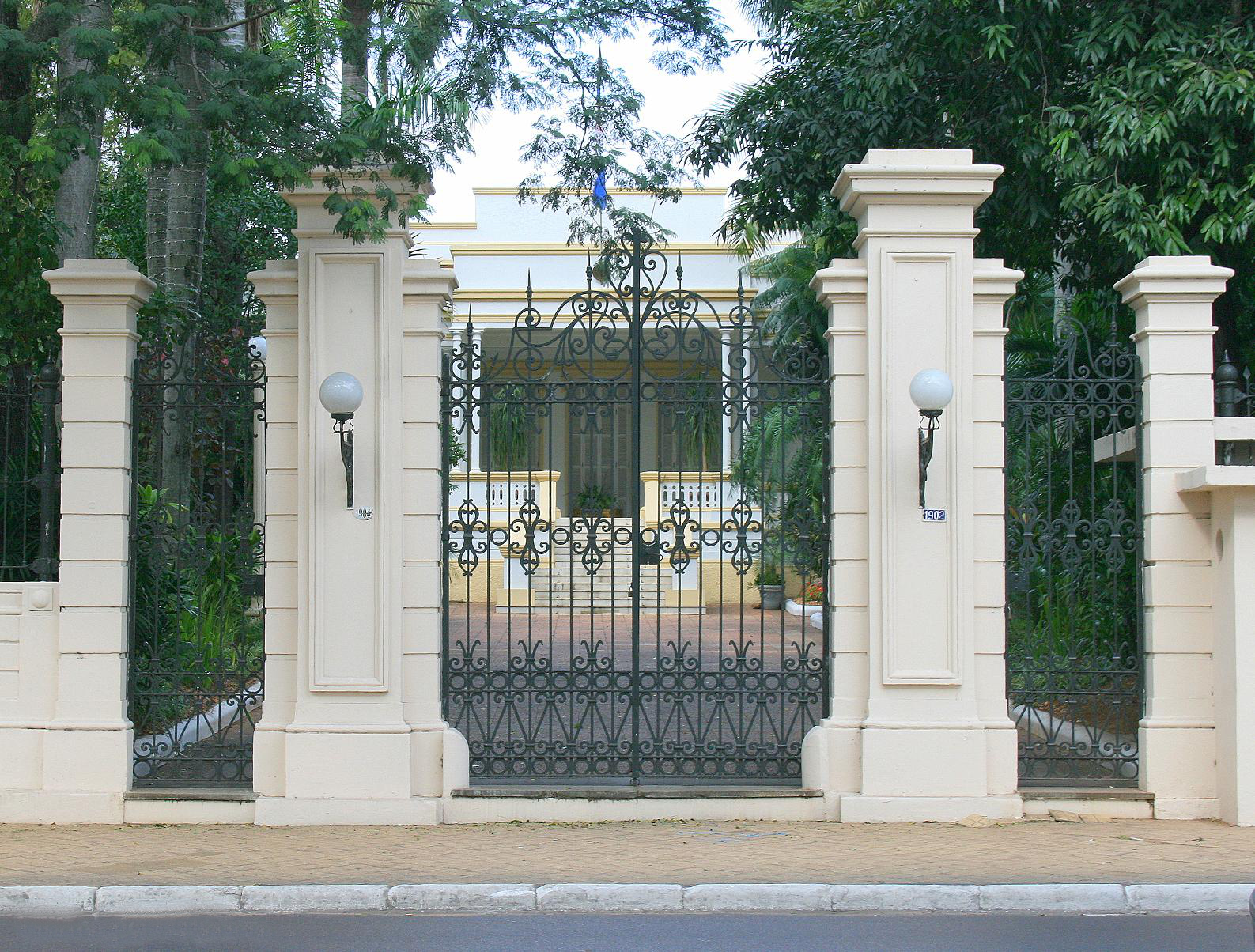
Mburuvicha Róga, the official residence

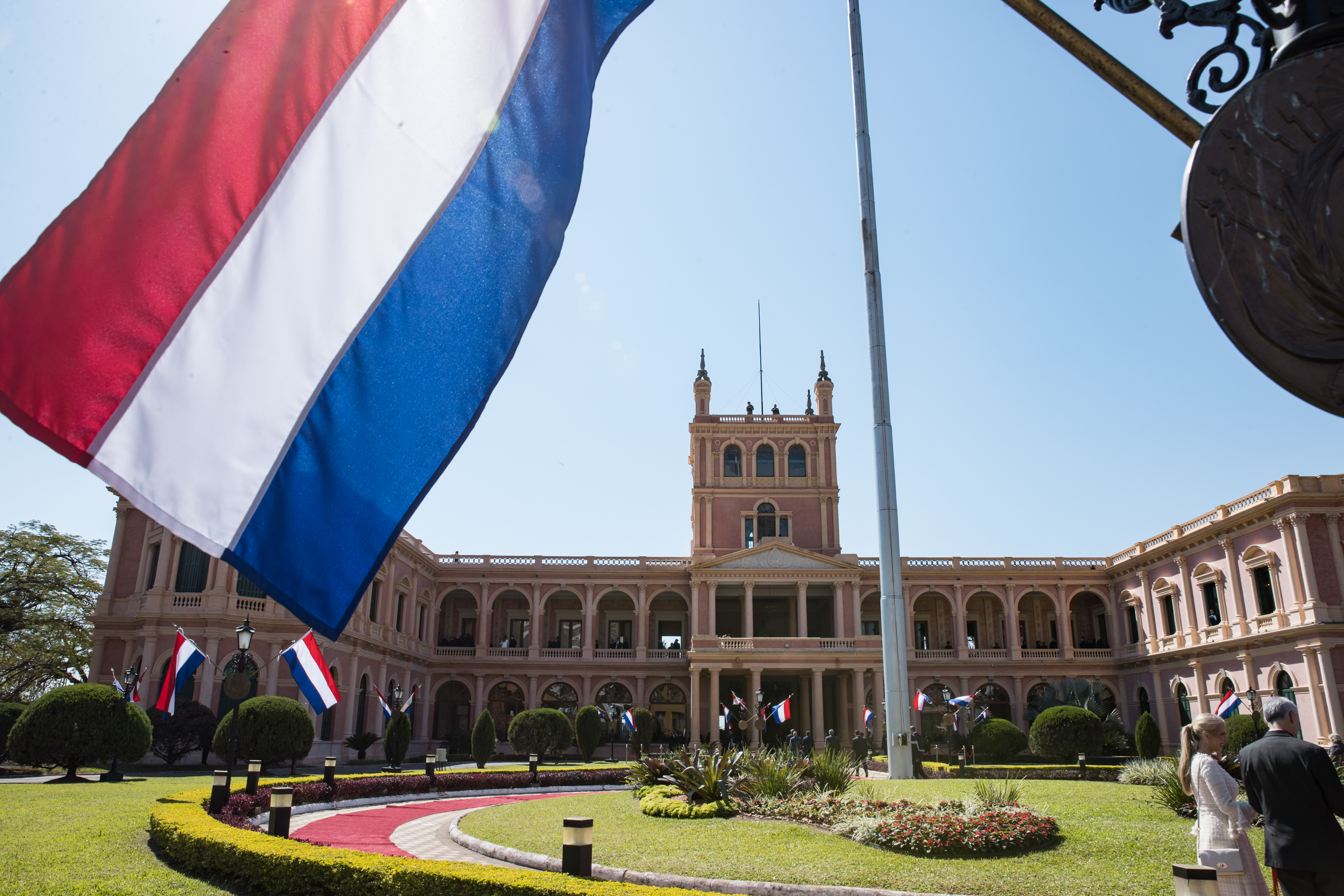
Palacio de los López, the official workplace

== Latest election ==
Candidate	Running mate	Party	Votes	%
Santiago Peña	Pedro Alliana	Colorado Party	1,291,209	43.93
Efraín Alegre	Soledad Núñez	National Coalition for a New Paraguay	830,302	28.25
Paraguayo Cubas	Stilber Valdez	National Crusade Party	692,429	23.56
Euclides Acevedo	Jorge Querey	New Republic Movement	41,164	1.40
José Luis Chilavert	Sofia Scheid	Party of the Youth	24,259	0.83
Luis Talavera Alegre	Celso Álvarez	Unámonos National Party	17,328	0.59
Jorge Humberto Gómez	Noelia Núñez	National Union of Ethical Citizens	12,066	0.41
Juan Félix Romero	Catalina Ramírez	Humanist and Solidarity Movement	5,869	0.20
Rosa María Bogarín	Herminio Lesme	Herederos Democratic Socialist Party	5,266	0.18
Prudencio Burgos	Leona Guaraní	National Party of the People 30A	5,258	0.18
Alfredo Luis Machuca	Justina Noguera	Citizen Patriotic Coordinator Movement	5,204	0.18
Óscar Mauricio Cañete	Luis Wilfrido Arce	Green Party Paraguay	4,847	0.16
Aurelio Martínez	David Sánchez	Únete Paraguay	3,866	0.13
Total			2,939,067	100.00
Valid votes			2,939,067	97.29
Invalid votes			13,694	0.45
Blank votes			68,288	2.26
Total votes			3,021,049	100.00
Registered voters/turnout			4,773,427	63.29
Source: TSJE

== See also ==
- First Lady of Paraguay
- List of heads of state of Paraguay
