= Efraín Alegre =

Paraguayan politician (born 1963)

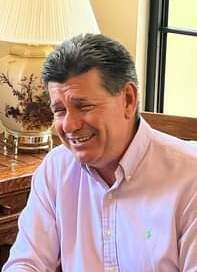
- Alegre in 2022

President of PLRA
- In office 16 June 2016 – 6 August 2023
- Preceded by: Miguel Abdón Saguier
- Succeeded by: Hugo Fleitas

Minister of Public Works and Communications of Paraguay
- In office 15 August 2008 – 17 June 2011
- President: Fernando Lugo
- Preceded by: Roberto Eudes González
- Succeeded by: Cecilio Pérez

Senator of Paraguay
- In office 1 July 2008 – 15 August 2008

President of the Chamber of Deputies of Paraguay
- In office 1 July 1999 – 1 July 2003
- Preceded by: Walter Hugo Bower Montalto
- Succeeded by: Cándido Vera Bejarano

National Deputy of Paraguay
- In office 1 July 1998 – 1 July 2008
- Constituency: Central Department

Personal details
- Born: 18 January 1963 (age 63) San Juan Bautista, Paraguay
- Party: Authentic Radical Liberal Party
- Spouse: Mirian Irún Aquino
- Education: Catholic University of Asunción
- Profession: Lawyer
- Website: www.efrainparaguay.com

Pedro Efraín Alegre Sasiain (born 18 January 1963) is a Paraguayan politician, lawyer, and university professor, who served as president of the Authentic Radical Liberal Party from 2016 to 2023. For ten years he was the most prominent leader of the opposition to the Colorado Party, running unsuccessfully against its candidates in the presidential elections of 2013, 2018 and 2023.

Alegre served as National Deputy from 1998 to 2008, president of the Chamber of Deputies from 2000 to 2001; Senator in 2008; and Minister of Public Work and Communications from 2008 to 2011 in the cabinet of Fernando Lugo.

== Biography ==
=== Early life and education ===
Alegre was born on 18 January 1963 in San Juan Bautista, Misiones Department, Paraguay, the son of Carlos Alegre and Irma Sasiain.

Alegre studied law at the Catholic University of Asunción, before completing a master's degree in political science from the Universidad Nacional de Asunción. Alegre also earned a postgraduate degrees in community law from the University of Salamanca in Spain, and senior management at Austral University in Buenos Aires, Argentina.

=== Personal life ===
Alegre is a practicing Catholic, and has voiced his opposition to abortion and same-sex marriage. He is married to Mirian Graciela Irún Aquino, with whom he has four children, Efraín, Nadia, Lucas, and Eliane.

== Politics ==
=== Beginnings (1983-1998) ===
In 1983, Alegre joined the youth wing of the Authentic Radical Liberal Party (PLRA), belonging in a faction that supported Domingo Laíno. He served as the wing's president in 1992.

Alegre served in the government of Central Department under Luis Alberto Wagner between 1993 and 1998, serving as its secretary general.

In 1995, Alegre was elected to serve as a member of the PLRA's national board.

=== Chamber of Deputies (1998-2008) ===
In 1998, Alegre was elected as a deputy for Central Department, sitting in the Chamber of Deputies. Alegre went on to serve as its president between 2000 and 2001.

Alegre was re-elected in the 2003 general election. He resigned in 2008 in order to accept a seat in the Senate of Paraguay.

=== Senate of Paraguay (2008) ===
During his time as senator, Alegre put forward several successful bills, including the introduction of a national tourism security system; making psychological evaluation a requirement of joining the National Police of Paraguay and implementing road safety as a part of the national education curriculum. Alegre resigned as senator in order to accept a role in the Ministry of Public Works and Communications.

=== Ministry of Public Works and Communications (2008-2011) ===
Alegre accepted the role of Minister of Public Works and Communications in the cabinet of Fernando Lugo. During his tenure, the Ministry underwent a tripling of its budget, with an investment of $600 million. One of the most significant projects undergone by Alegre was the construction of the Avenida Costanera in Asunción, the ground-breaking of which commenced in May 2020 with Lugo present, as well as Miguel Carrizosa, the president of the Congress of Paraguay, and Evanhy de Gallegos, the mayor of Asunción.

Alegre also established road maintenance programmes covering all asphalt roads in Paraguay, as well as projects focused on reconstructing and reinforcing the country's bridges and implementing measures to ensure the transparency of the Ministry of Public Works and Communications.

Public opinion of Alegre during his tenure was positive, with particular praise for the construction of the Avenida Costanera and an aqueduct in Chaco, and additions to Silvio Pettirossi International Airport, as well as his focus on restoring and maintaining Paraguay's architectural heritage. However, Alegre was criticised by Lugo and other members of his cabinet for alleged managerial irregularities.

On 17 June 2011, Alegre was removed from his position as minister and replaced by Cecilio Pérez. In the days following Alegre's removal, there was a mass resignation of Ministry of Public Works and Communications workers, who stated that the values of the Ministry and Alegre was contrary to the values of Lugo's government.

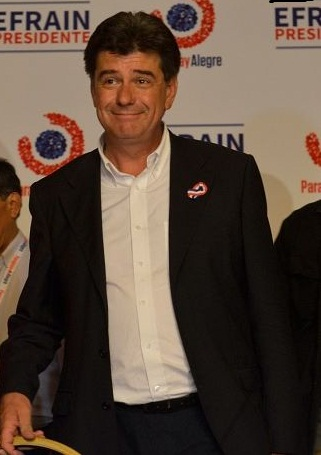
Alegre in 2013

=== 2013 presidential campaign ===
In August 2012, the National Directorate of the PLRA announced that Alegre had been selected as the consensus candidate for Paraguay's opposition parties, under a coalition called Paraguay Alegre. Alegre's running mate was Rafael Filizzola of the Progressive Democratic Party.

Two months before the election, Lino Oviedo, the presidential candidate of the National Union of Ethical Citizens, died in a plane crash. His party, as well as his widow Raquel Marín, released a statement of support for Alegre, describing him as the candidate most likely to achieve Oviedo's hope of preventing a government led by Horacio Cartes.

During his campaign, Alegre called for Paraguay not to return to the past and stressed the need to defeat narcopolitics, which many believed was a reference to Cartes, who was suspected of having ties to illegal organisations.

In the 2013 general election, Alegre lost the presidential election to Cartes.

=== Presidency of the Authentical Radical Liberal Party (2016-present) ===
On 16 June 2016, Alegre was elected as president of the PLRA, defeating Líder Amarilla and Salyn Buzarquis with 38.9% of the vote. He ran on the campaign slogan "away from Cartes, close to the people".

On 20 June 2021, Alegre was re-elected president of the PLRA, defeating Buzarquis and Carlos Silva with 34.9% of the vote.

=== 2018 presidential campaign ===
Alegre was again elected as the presidential candidate of the PLRA on 17 December 2017, defeating Carlos Mateo Balmelli, and served as the candidate for the Great Renewed National Alliance of opposition parties. His running mate was Leonardo Rubín of the Guasú Front.

During his campaign, Alegre promised to use executive power to make law a reduction in energy costs; free public health services; improved education; transparency in the civil service; and better safety. In some areas, polling showed Alegre ahead of the Colorado Party's candidate, Mario Abdo Benítez, in areas including Asunción and departments like Central, Concepción, San Pedro, Cordillera, Guairá, Caaguazú, Caazapá, Itapúa, Misiones, Paraguarí, Alto Paraná, and Amambay.

In the 2018 general election, Alegre was defeated by Abdo Benítez by a margin of 3.7%.

=== 2023 presidential election ===
In December 2022, Alegre was formally announced as the presidential candidate of the Concertación coalition of opposition parties, originally comprising 23 parties from the left and right of the political spectrum. On 16 August 2022, Alegre had confirmed that his running mate would be Soledad Núñez of the Awakening Movement.

During the campaign, Alegre has promised to utilise electrical energy generated by dams in Itaipu and Yacyretá. He has also voiced his intent to imprison members of the Cartes family for their links to organised crime.

In mid-January 2023, Alegre started his "Tour for Change", in which he visited each of Paraguay's 17 departments in 17 days.
