= Paraguayo Cubas =

Paraguayan politician (born 1962)

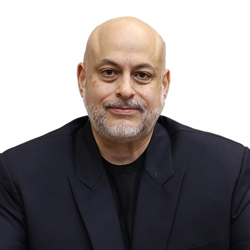

Senator of Paraguay
- In office 1 July 2018 – 28 November 2019

National Deputy of Paraguay
- In office 1 July 1993 – 1 July 1998
- Constituency: Alto Paraná

Personal details
- Born: Paraguayo Cubas Colomés; 8 January 1962 (age 64) Washington, D.C., United States
- Party: National Crusade Party (since 2018)
- Other political affiliations: National Encounter Party (1993–1998)
- Spouse: Yolanda Paredes
- Education: National University of Asunción
- Profession: Lawyer

Paraguayo "Payo" Cubas Colomés (born 8 January 1962) is a Paraguayan politician and media personality known for what some see as provocative publicity stunts. A lawyer, he served one term in Congress from 1993 to 1998 as a member of the center-left National Encounter Party. In 2018, Cubas was elected to the Senate as a sole member of the National Crusade Movement but was suspended for outbursts and physical altercations with Senate colleagues.

On the eve of the 2023 general election, Cubas with his party participated in the creation of the Concertación coalition, but soon left it before the election of a single opposition candidate, deciding to participate in the elections independently. In the 2023 elections, Cubas was considered an outsider or spoiler candidate for the Concertación. However, he had support among the anti-establishment electorate, advocating the death penalty for corruption. He finished third, with almost 23% of the vote.

== Personal ==
Cubas was born in Washington, D.C., on January 8, 1962, where his father, Paraguayan Army Colonel Roberto Cubas Barbosa, was a member of the General Staff of the Organization of American States.

== Controversies ==
Cubas was arrested in 2016 after hitting a judge with a belt and defecating in the office of the judge's secretary. In 2021, he was reported to have punched and kicked an electoral prosecutor, as well as having stole his kepi.

After losing the 2023 presidential election, Cubas claimed that there was widespread fraud, saying that the election was "stolen", despite declarations from observers from the Organization of American States and the European Union that any possibility of fraud was discarded. After the statements, numerous protests and blockades were reported in different parts of the country by Cubas sympathizers, particularly in front of the headquarters of the Electoral Justice Superior Court (TSJE) in Asunción. On 5 May, police announced that Cubas had been arrested, and was being held in "preventative detention".
