= TV Cámara =

- Broadcast area: Paraguay
- Headquarters: Asunción, Paraguay

Ownership
- Owner: Chamber of Deputies of Paraguay

History
- Launched: June 5, 2012; 14 years ago

TV Cámara is a Paraguayan over-the-air television channel owned by the Chamber of Deputies of Paraguay. The channel provides live gavel-to-gavel coverage of its proceedings.

== History ==
The channel started broadcasting on 5 June 2012 on UHF channel 17 in Asunción; all of its infrastructure was funded through a single Taiwanese donation. A second donation came on 19 December to finish its development project. On 7 November 2013, the station started broadcasting to Pedro Juan Caballero through a relay station, as well as on Copaco's IPTV and fiber networks.

The channel airs live proceedings from both the Chamber and the Senate. In 2014, it was suggested that the Senate hearings were to be pre-recorded first in the event that both chambers would have their hearings at the same time, leaving only the Chamber of Deputies live. This ended up happening in July. The decision was reverted when new times for hearings were approved in November. On 8 December 2014, a contract was signed with Tigo Paraguay to distribute the channel to cable companies in the country's inland.

In February 2020, the channel's programming schedule added cultural programming. On 26 May, it signed an agreement with Claro Paraguay to reach to 500,000 additional households.
