= National Crusade Party =

Political party in Paraguay

National Crusade Party Partido Cruzada Nacional
- Abbreviation: PCN
- Leader: Payo Cubas
- President: Hermes Chamorro Garcete
- Founded: 25 August 2018 (MCN); 4 March 2020 (PCN)
- Headquarters: Teniente Moreno 371 c/ Teniente Bernal, barrio Fátima, Asunción
- Ideology: Paraguayan nationalism Right-wing populism Anti-corruption; Anti-establishment; Anti-Brazilian sentiment
- Political position: Far-right
- National affiliation: Concertación (2022)
- Colours: Black; Yellow
- Chamber of Deputies: 4 / 80
- Chamber of Senators: 2 / 45

Website
- pcn.org.py

The National Crusade Party (PCN, Spanish: Partido Cruzada Nacional), formerly the National Crusade Movement (MCN, Spanish: Movimento Cruzada Nacional), is a far-right populist political party in Paraguay led by lawyer and ex-senator Paraguayo "Payo" Cubas.

Party leader Payo Cubas is a prominent political and media personality known for his provocative publicity stunts. A lawyer, he served one term in Congress from 1993 to 1998 as a member of the center-left National Encounter Party. In 2018, Cubas was elected to the Senate as a sole member of the National Crusade Movement but was suspended for outbursts and physical altercations with Senate colleagues.

== History ==
Following the results of the 2018 elections, the party elected its representative, Paraguayo "Payo" Cubas, to the Senate. In November 2019, he was expelled from the Senate on charges of abuse of power and hooliganism.

In February 2020, the National Crusade Movement was renamed to the National Crusade Party.

In 2020, the party suffered a split after some members of the MCN accused the leader of the party, Cubas, and his wife, Yolanda Paredes, of authoritarianism.

After the party's failure in the 2021 municipal elections, Paraguayo Cubas, the president of the party, announced his resignation.

On the eve of the 2023 general election, the Cubas party participated in the creation of the Concertación coalition, but soon left it before the election of a single opposition candidate, deciding to participate in the elections independently. In the 2023 elections, Cubas was considered an outsider or spoiler candidate for the Concertación, who would gain support among the anti-systemic electorate, advocating the death penalty for corruption.

In the general election, despite Cubas losing the presidential election (winning almost 23% of the vote), the party became the third largest political force in both Chambers of Congress (after the Colorado Party and the PLRA), winning four seats in the Chamber of Deputies and five seats in the Senate. Among the Senators-elect are Cubas's wife Yolanda Paredes and plastic artist Rafael "Mbururú" Esquivel, the latter arrested over child sexual abuse charges at the time of the election.

== Electoral results ==
=== President ===
Election	Candidate	Votes	%	Result
2023	Paraguayo Cubas	692,663	22.92%	Lost ✗

=== Senate ===
Election	Votes	%	Position	Seats	+/–	Government
2018	58,409	2.48%	▲7th	1 / 45	New	Opposition
2023	331,657	11.00%	▲3rd	5 / 45	▲6	Opposition

=== Chamber of Deputies ===
Election	Votes	%	Position	Seats	+/–	Government
2018	33,417	1.41%	▲7th	1 / 80	New	Opposition
2023	233,812	8.24%	▲3rd	4 / 80	▲3	Opposition
