= Esperanza Martínez (politician) =

Paraguayan politician

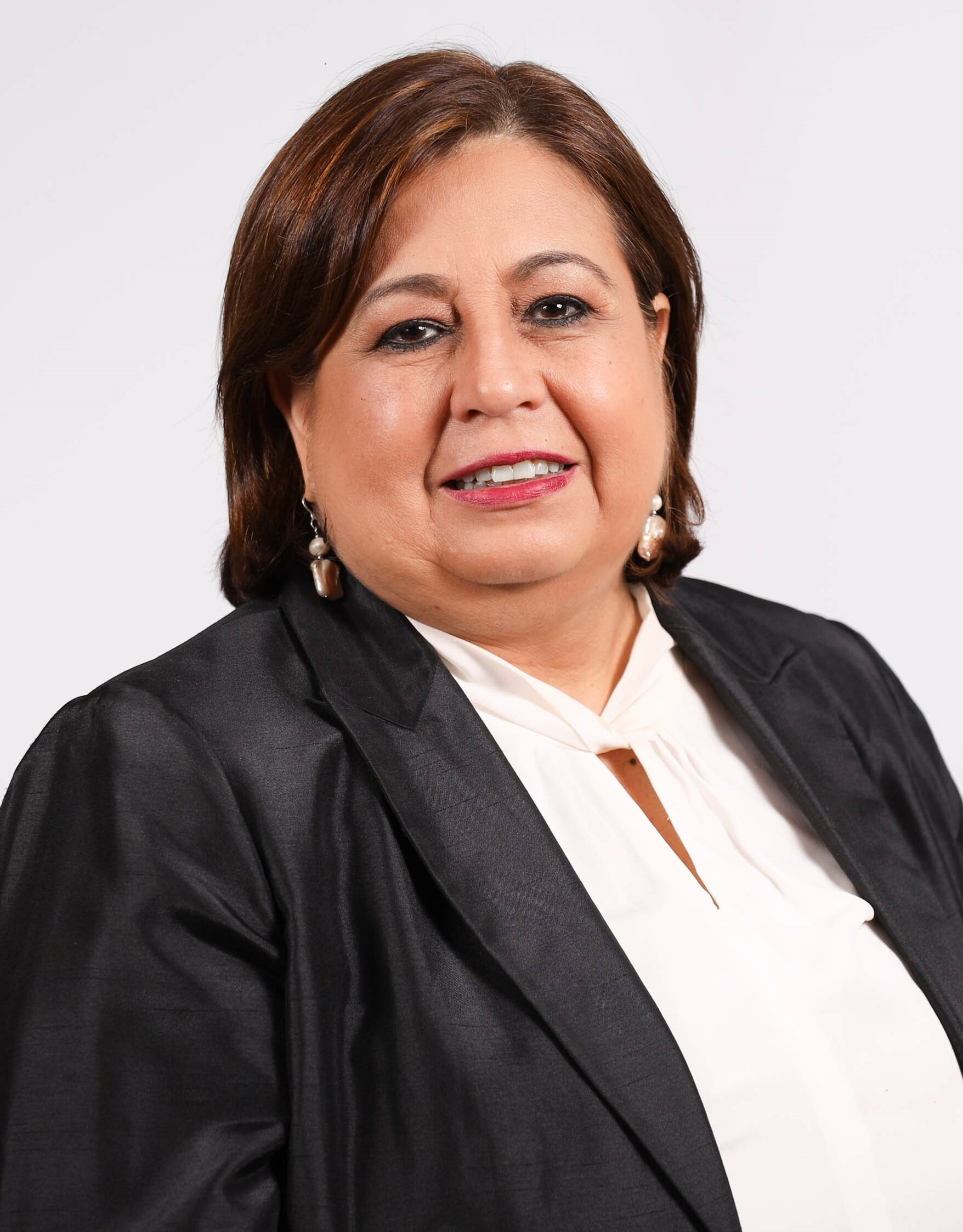
- Official portrait, 2023

Senator of Paraguay
- Incumbent
- Assumed office 30 June 2013

Minister of Public Health and Social Welfare of Paraguay
- In office 15 August 2008 – 22 June 2012
- President: Fernando Lugo
- Preceded by: Oscar Martínez Doldán
- Succeeded by: Antonio Arbo

Personal details
- Born: Esperanza Martínez Lleida; April 26, 1959 (age 67) Asunción, Paraguay
- Party: Public Participation Party
- Other political affiliations: Guasú Front
- Spouse: Carlos Portillo MD
- Children: 3
- Parents: Benito Martínez; Mercedes Lleida
- Occupation: Medical doctor; politician

Esperanza Martínez Lleida de Portillo (born 26 April 1959) is a Paraguayan medical doctor and politician, currently serving as senator since 2013.

She previously served as Minister of Public Health and Social Welfare from 2008 to 2012, under President Fernando Lugo.

In May 2012 she was elected vice-president for the 65th World Health Assembly of the World Health Organization.

She is an advocate of liberalizing implementation of laws regarding abortion in Paraguay to help a pregnant 10-year-old who was raped by her stepfather, complaining that to those who opposed the treatment, the unnamed girl "became a uterus. She became a birth canal."

On November 15, 2023, Senator Martinez presented Resolution No. 383, which was approved by the Senate (File S-2300589), to request information and documents from Ruben Ramirez Lezcano (advisor to Itaipú and Minister of Foreign Affairs) related to the investments of the Itaipú retirement and pension fund (Cajubi]) abroad, known as “the robbery of the centruy"..
