= Soledad Núñez =

Paraguayan civil engineer and politician (born 1983)

- Núñez in 2019

Intendant of Asunción
- Incumbent
- Assumed office 3 November 2026
- Preceded by: Luis Bello

Executive Secretary of the National Secretariat of Housing and Habitat of Paraguay
- In office 1 October 2014 – 6 August 2018
- President: Horacio Cartes
- Preceded by: Francisco Knapps
- Succeeded by: Dany Durand

Personal details
- Born: April 9, 1983 (age 43) Asunción, Paraguay
- Party: Independent
- Other political affiliations: Alianza Unidos por Asunción (since 2025); Concertación (2022—2023)
- Spouse: Bruno Raúl Defelippe Díaz de Espada (2020)

María Soledad "Sole" Núñez Méndez (born 9 April 1983) is a Paraguayan civil engineer and politician. She was the candidate for vice president of Paraguay for the Concertación political alliance in the 2023 general elections as the running mate of Efraín Alegre, losing to Santiago Peña and Pedro Alliana of the Colorado Party.

She previously served as executive secretary of the National Secretariat of Housing and Habitat of Paraguay from 2014 to 2018. In 2026, she ran for intendant of Asunción, being elected after defeating the frontrunner in the polls, Colorado Party candidate Camilo Pérez; she took the office on November 3, 2026 to a 5-year term.

== Biography ==
Núñez was born in Asunción, Paraguay, on 9 April 1983. She was raised in the General Díaz neighborhood of the city and spent a large part of her childhood in the Chaco region along with her grandfather, a veteran of the Chaco War.

She studied civil engineering at the National University of Asunción (UNA) and she later began her professional career in the private sector.

In 2008, she obtained a master's degree in Management and Integrated Management of Construction Projects and Real Estate Assets at the Technical University of Madrid and the following year she became director of the Latin American NGO TECHO in Paraguay, a position she held until 2013. Also in those years, she was invited to integrate ad honorem the first National Country Strategy Team, an initiative of the Paraguayan government to organize a plan to reduce poverty in the country.

In 2014, she received a scholarship at the Georgetown University School of Business.

== Political career ==
=== Minister ===
In 2014, she participated in the creation of the National Open Government Plan and on October 1 of that year she was appointed Minister of the National Secretariat of Housing and Habitat (Senavitat) of her country until 2018, being one of the youngest female ministers in the country's history. During her tenure, the National Habitat Committee was created. In 2015 she was elected president of the Assembly of Ministers of Housing and Urban Development for Latin America and the Caribbean. The figures of the previous administrations added up to 1,000 homes built, but she left a portfolio with 37,000 homes: 30,000 finished (or with more than 95% progress) and 7,000 in progress. The total investment for her period is around 2.5 billion guaraníes.

After leaving office, in 2019 she earned her second master's degree in Public Policy at the University of Oxford and was part of a program in Leadership and Public Policy at the Harvard Kennedy School.

In 2020, during the quarantine declared as a result of the COVID-19 pandemic, she joined the Settlement Support Network. She also founded the NGO Alma Cívica, of which she was the executive director.

Núñez is the academic director of the Diploma in Public Policy at the UCOM University, member of the team of the dialogue initiative "Paraguay Ahora"”, and is part of the Board of Directors of the NGO Enseña por Paraguay (Teach for all) and the advisory board of Roof Paraguay.

=== 2023 general election ===
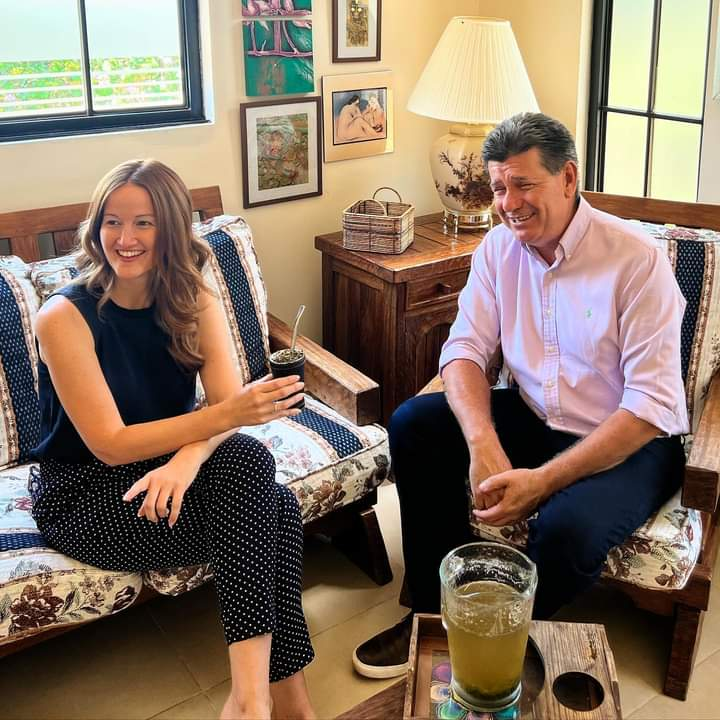
Núñez and Efraín Alegre in December 2022.

In May 2022, Núñez presented her presidential candidacy for the National Concertation to compete in the 2023 general election. In August of that same year, however, she declined her presidential aspirations to be Efraín Alegre's vice-presidential candidate.

We understand that alternation in Paraguay is more necessary than ever, it accentuates our responsibility that we cannot avoid. We have consolidated an alliance, which does not imply a resignation, I do not renounce my independence; It is a duo thinking about the country, because the country unites us

— Soledad Núñez, in her official presentation as a vice-presidential candidate.

=== Intendant of Asunción (since 2026) ===
Sole was officially named the candidate for the intendancy of Asunción in early 2026, representin the liberal coalition "Alianza Unidos por Asunción". Her main opponent was the ANR candidate Camilo Pérez, president of the Paraguayan Olympic Committee, and who was the polls-favorite candidate. Soledad was elected on October 4, receiving 133,429 votes (49.1% of the total) against 128,415 (47.3%) for Camilo. She took office on November 3, 2026, for a five-year term.

== Personal life ==
Nunez is a Catholic. She married Bruno Raúl Defelippe Díaz de Espada in 2020.

In 2002, Defelippe, 18, was physically assaulted by former president Juan Carlos Wasmosy when the former criticized the latter for his management as president. Defelippe unsuccessfully ran for National Senator for the National Encounter Party in the 2023 general elections, together with his wife's candidacy for vice presidency.
