= Tekojoja People's Movement =

Political party in Paraguay

Tekojoja People's Movement Partido Popular Tekojoja Tekojoja Tavaygua Movimiento (Guarani)
- President: Sixto Pereira Galeano
- Founded: 17 December 2006
- Headquarters: Asunción
- Ideology: Progressivism; Democratic socialism Left-wing nationalism
- Political position: Left-wing
- National affiliation: Guasú Front
- Regional affiliation: São Paulo Forum
- Chamber of Deputies: 0 / 80
- Senate: 1 / 45

The Tekojoja People's Movement (Spanish: Partido Popular Tekojoja) is a democratic socialist political party from Paraguay. Its name is a Guarani word meaning life among equals.
