= Salyn Buzarquis =

Paraguayan politician (born 1974)

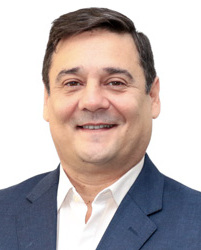
- Buzarquis in 2023

Member of the Senate
- Incumbent
- Assumed office 30 June 2018

Personal details
- Born: 11 November 1974 (age 51)
- Party: Authentic Radical Liberal Party

Enrique Salyn Concepción Buzarquis Cáceres (born 11 November 1974) is a Paraguayan politician serving as a member of the Senate since 2018. He was a member of the Chamber of Deputies from 2008 to 2012, and served as president of the Chamber from 2008 to 2010. From 2012 to 2013, he served as minister of public works and communications.
