= Chamber of Deputies of Paraguay =

Lower house of Paraguay's legislature

Chamber of Deputies Cámara de Diputados
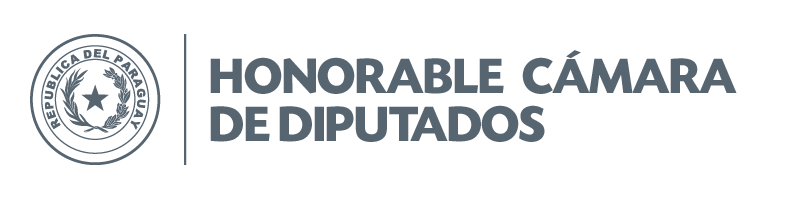

Type
- Type: Lower House of the Congress of Paraguay

History
- Founded: 1813

Leadership
- President: Raúl Luís Latorre, ANR since 1 July 2023

Structure
- Seats: 80
- Political groups: Government (48): ANR-PC (48); Opposition (32): PLRA (22); PCN (4); CDN (2); PEN (1); PPH (1); PPQ (1); PPS (1)

Elections
- Voting system: Proportional representation
- Last election: 30 April 2023

Meeting place
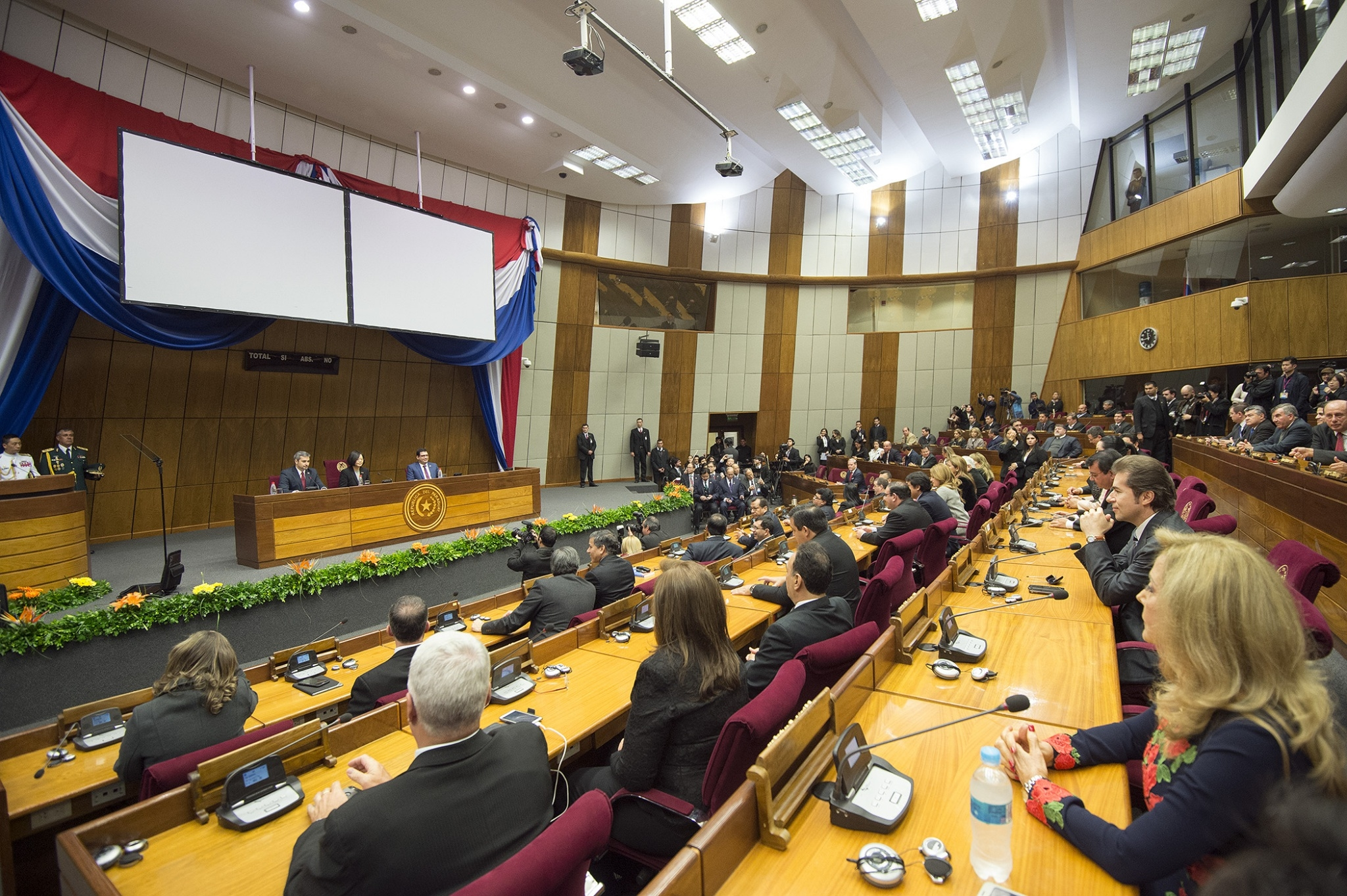
- Legislative Palace, Asunción

Website
- diputados.gov.py

The Chamber of Deputies (Spanish: Cámara de Diputados) is the lower house of Paraguay's bicameral legislature, the National Congress. It is made up of 80 members, elected for a five-year term by proportional representation. The other chamber of the National Congress (Congreso Nacional) is the Chamber of Senators (Cámara de Senadores).

A unicameral congress was established in 1813, and replaced with a bicameral congress including the Chamber of Deputies and the Senate in 1870. In 1940, a unicameral Chamber of Representatives was formed, and since 1967 there has been a bicameral legislature.

== Latest election ==
=== Chamber of Deputies ===
Party	Votes	%	Seats	+/–
National Republican Association-Colorado Party	1,345,730	47.43	48	+6
National Crusade Party	233,812	8.24	4	+3
Alliance for Fatherland	221,383	7.80	6	New
Beloved Fatherland Party	92,874	3.27	1	–2
National Encounter Alliance	81,843	2.88	2	0
National Coalition for a New Paraguay Caaguazú	70,877	2.50	2	New
I Believe	66,126	2.33	2	New
Itapúa Departmental Coalition 2023	60,273	2.12	2	New
National Coalition for a New Paraguay Cordillera	59,752	2.11	2	New
National Coalition for a New Paraguay Alto Paraná	51,002	1.80	1	New
Departmental Coalition for a New San Pedro	47,265	1.67	2	New
Alliance for Asunción Deputies	46,382	1.63	1	New
Alliance for a New Paraguarí	36,667	1.29	1	New
National Coalition for a New Paraguay Concepción	36,247	1.28	1	New
Guasu Ñemongeta Front	33,254	1.17	0	0
National Union of Ethical Citizens	31,969	1.13	0	0
Alliance for a New Guairá	29,511	1.04	1	New
Authentic Radical Liberal Party	28,162	0.99	1	–
New Republic Movement	27,496	0.97	0	New
Misiones Departmental Coalition 2023	24,688	0.87	1	New
Party of the Youth	22,747	0.80	0	New
Canindeyú Alliance	22,081	0.78	1	New
Alliance for a New Caazapá	16,881	0.59	0	New
All Together Alliance for Ñeembucú	16,788	0.59	1	New
Alliance for a New Itapúa	15,240	0.54	0	New
Unámonos National Party	15,029	0.53	0	New
National Party of the People 30A	14,188	0.50	0	New
Citizen Patriotic Coordinator Movement	12,370	0.44	0	New
Liberty and Republic Party	10,200	0.36	0	New
Boquerón Alliance Unites Us	8,048	0.28	0	New
Alliance for a New President Hayes	7,906	0.28	0	New
Dreamt Fatherland Party	7,206	0.25	0	New
Let's go to Boquerón	6,974	0.25	0	New
Herederos Democratic Socialist Party	6,289	0.22	0	New
Humanist and Solidarity Movement	4,508	0.16	0	New
President Hayes Alliance for the Fatherland	4,174	0.15	0	New
National Coalition for a New Paraguay Alto Paraguay	3,317	0.12	0	New
Únete Paraguay	2,835	0.10	0	New
Capital Patriotic Union Alliance	2,732	0.10	0	New
Northern Popular Unity	2,571	0.09	0	New
Alliance Patriotic Union of San Pedro	2,066	0.07	0	New
New Air Political Movement for Alto Paraná	1,407	0.05	0	New
National Encounter Party	1,391	0.05	0	0
Cordillera Patriotic Union Alliance	1,388	0.05	0	New
Caazapá Patriotic Union Alliance	913	0.03	0	New
Tekojoja People's Party	850	0.03	0	0
Alliance Patriotic Union of Paraguarí	841	0.03	0	New
Green Party Paraguay	684	0.02	0	New
Alliance Patriotic Union of Concepción	613	0.02	0	New
Total	2,837,550	100.00	80	0
Valid votes	2,837,550	94.22		
Invalid votes	13,650	0.45		
Blank votes	160,551	5.33		
Total votes	3,011,751	100.00		
Registered voters/turnout	4,730,694	63.66		
Source: TSJE

== See also ==
- List of presidents of the Chamber of Deputies of Paraguay
- TV Cámara

== Website ==
- Deputies of Paraguay Website (in Spanish)
