= Concertación (Paraguay) =

Coalition of political parties in Paraguay

Coalition for a New Paraguay Concertación Para un Nuevo Paraguay
- Leader: Efraín Alegre
- Founded: 9 July 2022
- Preceded by: Great Renewed National Alliance
- Ideology: Big tent
- Political position: Center to centre-left
- Member parties: PLRA; PDP; PRF; PDC; PPS
- Chamber of Deputies: 27 / 80
- Chamber of Senators: 17 / 45

Website
- concertacionpy.web.app

The Coalition for a New Paraguay (Spanish: Concertación para un Nuevo Paraguay, Concertación), also known as Concertación 2023 or Concertación Opositora, is a coalition of Paraguayan political parties opposed to the ruling ANR-PC, formed in 2022.

The Concertación held internal elections on 18 December 2022 where the candidates for governorship and the presidential duo for the 2023 general elections were defined. Efraín Alegre was selected as the coalition's presidential candidate. This the third consecutive election in which he presented his candidacy. Soledad Núñez was chosen as the candidate for vice president. They finished in second place with 28.25% of the vote, behind the ANR-PC nominees' 43.93%.

== Members ==
Party	Political position	Leader
Authentic Radical Liberal Party	Centre to centre-left	Efraín Alegre
Progressive Democratic Party	Centre-left	Desirée Masi
Revolutionary Febrerista Party	Centre-left	Guillermo Ferreiro
Party for a Country of Solidarity	Centre-left to left-wing	Carlos Filizzola Pallarés
Christian Democratic Party	Centre-left	Hugo Portillo
Awakening Movement		Soledad Núñez
Paraguay Pyahura Party		Ermo Rodríguez
Broad Front Party	Centre-left	Pedro Almada Galeano
Party of the A		Víctor Oti Sánchez
