= List of Paraguayans =

The following is a list of people from Paraguay.

== A ==
- Lourdes Arévalos (born 1984), beauty queen and model

== B ==
- Cecilio Báez (1862-1941), politician, writer and president
- Agustín Barboza (1913-1998), singer and composer
- Agustín Barrios-Mangoré (1885-1944), guitarist and composer
- Edgar Baumann (born 1970), former track and field athlete
- Yohana Benítez (born 1987), beauty queen and model
- Emilio Bigi (1910-1969), musician
- Luis Bordón (1926-2006), harp player
- José Bozzano (1895-1969), military engineer who designed gunboats for the Chaco War
- Karina Buttner (born 1983), beauty queen and model

== C ==
- Victor Caballero (born 1960), former tennis player
- Agustín Cañete (1844-1902), minister of finance
- Gabriel Casaccia (1907-1980), writer
- Raúl Casal Ribeiro (1887-1956), lawyer and vice president
- José Cardozo (born 1971), former professional footballer
- Leonor Cecotto (died 1982), artist
- Feliciano Centurión (1962-1996), painter
- Juan Crisóstomo Centurión (1840-1902), military officer and minister of foreign affairs
- Teresio Centurión (born 1958), former footballer
- José Luis Chilavert (born 1965), former professional footballer
- Julio Correa (1890-1953), playwright
- Raúl Cubas Grau (born 1943), politician and former president

== D ==
- José Segundo Decoud (1848-1909), former President of the Supreme Court
- Juan Francisco Decoud (1813-1897), leader of the Paraguayan Legion
- Rogelio Delgado (born 1959), former professional footballer
- Nicanor Duarte Frutos (born 1956), former President of Paraguay

== E ==
- Egni Eckert (born 1987), beauty queen and model
- Arsenio Erico (1915-1977), soccer player
- Víctor Espínola, harp player

== F ==
- Amilcar Ferreira (born 1971), economist and politician
- Buenaventura Ferreira (born 1960), former professional footballer
- Diego Ferreira (born 1975), former track and field athlete
- Nadia Ferreira (born 1999), Miss Universe Paraguay & Miss Universe 2021 first runner-up
- Diego Martínez Ferreira (born 1980), former professional footballer
- Ramona Ferreira, Paraguayan journalist and feminist
- Renée Ferrer de Arréllaga (born 1944), writer
- Carlos Filizzola (born 1959), politician and former mayor of Asunción
- José Asunción Flores (1904-1972), director and composer
- Carlos Franco (born 1965), professional golfer
- Julio César Franco (born 1951), politician and former vice-president
- Julio César Franco (born 1965), former footballer
- Leryn Franco (born 1982), former track and field athlete

== G ==
- Carlos Gamarra (born 1971), former professional footballer
- Juan Andrés Gelly (1790-1856), diplomat
- Herminio Giménez (1905-1991), composer
- Juan Silvano Godoi (1850-1926), writer and museum director
- Sila Godoy (1919-2014), guitarist and composer
- Guadalupe González (born 1992), beauty queen and model
- Juan Natalicio González (1897-1966), president and writer
- Luis González Macchi (born 1947), politician and former president
- Yanina González (born 1979), beauty queen and model
- Julieta Granada (born 1987), golfer
- Cesar Grillon (born 1957), former Paraguayan ambassador to Indonesia

== H ==
- Juan Carlos Herken Krauer (born 1953), writer and economist

== J ==
- Juan Antonio Jara (1845-1887), vice-president of Paraguay
- Ramón Jiménez Gaona (born 1969), former track and field athlete
- Juliana (died c. 1542), 16th-century Guaraní rebel

== K ==
- Nery Kennedy (born 1973), former track and field athlete
- Eduard Klassen, harpist

== L ==
- Nicolás Léoz (1928-2019), CONMEBOL president
- Carlos Antonio López (1792-1862), politician and president
- Ercilia López de Blomberg (1865-1962), writer
- Francisco Solano López (1827-1870), politician and president
- Venancio López (1830-1870), minister of war and navy
- Venancio Víctor López (1862-1927), attorney and minister of justice
- Aníbal Lovera (1926-1994), composer and singer
- Rafael Lovera (1952-2023), professional boxer

== M ==
- María Maldonado (born 1985), beauty queen, model and singer
- Jovino Mendoza (born 1941), former professional football player
- Fiorella Migliore (born 1989), beauty queen, model and actress
- Ricardo Migliorisi (1948-2019), painter, costume designer, scenery designer and architect
- José Mongelós, opera singer
- Richard Moray, professional boxer
- Margarita Morselli, artist

== N ==
- Jorge Daniel Núñez (born 1984), former professional football player
- Jorge Martín Núñez (born 1978), former professional football player

== O ==
- Domingo Antonio Ortiz (1832-1889), naval officer
- Christian Ovelar (born 1985), former professional footballer
- Lino Oviedo (1943-2013), general and coup leader

== P ==
- Raúl Sapena Pastor (1908-1989), diplomat
- Víctor Pecci (born 1955), former tennis player
- Silvio Pettirossi (1887-1916), aviator
- Josefina Plá (1903-1999), poet and artist

== Q ==
- Andrea Quattrocchi (born 1989), actress and ballerina
- Fabio Queirolo (1861-1901), foreign minister

== R ==
- Gabriela Rejala (born 1989), beauty queen and model
- Alba Riquelme (born 1991), beauty queen and model
- Blas Riquelme (1929-2012), politician, businessman and landowner
- Larissa Riquelme (born 1985), model and actress, named "Girl of the FIFA 2010 World Cup"
- Augusto Roa Bastos (1917-2005), writer, novelist
- Andrés Rodríguez (1923-1997), army general and president
- Guido Rodríguez Alcalá (born 1946), writer
- Hugo Rodríguez-Alcalá (1917-2007), writer
- José Gaspar Rodríguez de Francia (1766-1840), first Paraguayan head of government
- Yren Rotela (born 1981), activist for rights of LGBT people and sex workers

== S ==
- Roque Santa Cruz (born 1981), professional footballer
- Oscar Vicente Scavone (born 1955), businessman
- Clara Sosa (born 1993), beauty queen and model, winner of Miss Grand International 2018
- Alfredo Stroessner (1912-2006), dictator of Paraguay

== T ==
- Tsiweyenki (Gloria Elizeche) (born 1951), leader of the indigenous Maká people

== V ==
- Héctor Velázquez (1864-1945), ophthalmologist
- Pablo Medina Velázquez (1961-2014), journalist

== W ==
- Juan Carlos Wasmosy (born 1938), former president of Paraguay

== Z ==
- Pablo Zeballos (born 1986), professional footballer

== See also ==
- List of people by nationality
- List of presidents of Paraguay
- Hispanics
