= Reinas del Paraguay =

National beauty pageant competition in Paraguay

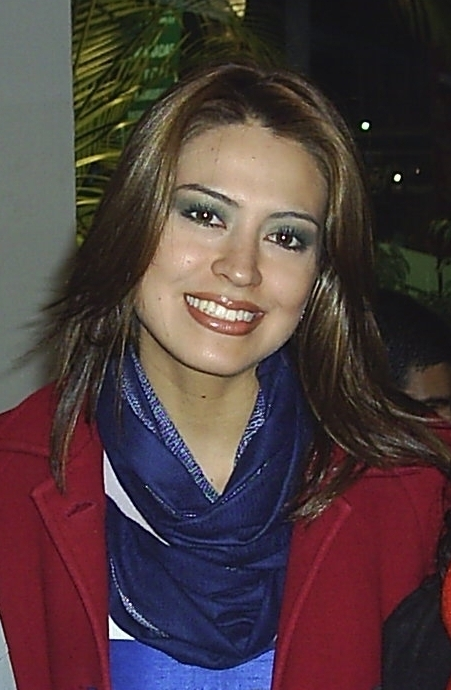
- Yanina González, Miss Universe Paraguay 2004
- Type: Women's beauty pageant
- Parent organization: Agri Terra S. A.
- Headquarters: Asunción, Paraguay
- Country represented: Paraguay
- Qualifies for: Miss Universe; Miss World; Miss International; Miss Earth
- First edition: 2022
- Last edition: 2023
- National director: Ariela Machado
- Language: Spanish

Reinas del Paraguay (transl. Queens of Paraguay) is a national beauty pageant in Paraguay. It was founded in 2022 to select the Paraguayan representatives in the Miss Universe, Miss World, Miss International and Miss Earth pageants.

== History ==
Between 2004 and 2021, the entity in charge of selecting Paraguayan representatives for international pageants was the Bolivian company Promociones Gloria, which also organizes the Miss Bolivia pageant.

On March 10, 2022, it was informed that Ariela Machado, Miss Universe Paraguay 2017, acquired the Miss Universe license. On April 25, Machado confirmed that she bought the license together with her husband, Carsten Pfau, with the company Agri Terra S. A. On June 7, the pageant was launched with the name under the direction of Ariela Machado and with Paolo Defelippe as general producer.

In 2023, the pageant sent a representative to the Reina Hispanoamericana.

== Titleholders ==
=== Reinas del Paraguay ===
Year	Miss Universe Paraguay	Miss World Paraguay	Miss International Paraguay	Miss Earth Paraguay	Reina Hispanoamericana Paraguay	Ref.
2025	Yanina Gómez Ojeda	—N/a				
2024	Naomi Méndez	—N/a				
2023	Elicena Andrada Orrego	Yanina Gómez Ojeda	Jimena Sosa Martínez	Gretha Estigarribia Matiauda	Lorena Román Castillo	
2022	Leah Duarte Ashmore	Dahiana Benítez Gatzke	Jazmín de la Sierra Rodríguez	Macarena Tomas	—N/a	

=== Reinas de Belleza del Paraguay (2004–2021) ===
From 2004 to 2021, the Bolivian company Promociones Gloria selected Paraguayan representatives to compete in international competitions.

Year	Miss Universe Paraguay	Miss World Paraguay	Miss International Paraguay	Miss Earth Paraguay	Ref.
2021	Nadia Ferreira	Bethania Borba	Ariane Maciel	Evelyn Andrade	
2020	Vanessa Castro (Note: Castro was crowned in an exclusive final for Miss Universe 2020 called "Miss Universo Paraguay 2020" on December 4 of that year.)	—N/a		Natalhia Escobar Jiménez (Note: On September 23, 2020, via Instagram, Promociones Gloria announced that Escobar was appointed to represent the country at Miss Earth 2020.)	
2019	Ketlin Lotterman	Araceli Bobadilla	Elida Lezcano	Jociani Repossi	
2018	Belén Alderete	Maquenna Gaiarín Díaz	—N/a	Larissa Domínguez Morel	
2017	Ariela Machado	Paola Oberladstatter	Daisy Lezcano Rojas	Valeria Ivasiuten	
2016	Andrea Melgarejo	Simone Freitag	Tatiana Rolín	Vanessa Ramírez	
2015	Laura Garcete (dethroned)	Giovanna Cordeiro	Mónica Mariani	Andrea Melgarejo	
2015	Myriam Arévalos (assumed)	Giovanna Cordeiro	Mónica Mariani	Andrea Melgarejo	
2014	Sally Jara	Myriam Arévalos	Jéssica Servín	Sendy Cáceres	
2013	Guadalupe González	Coral Ruíz Reyes	María Marta Raviolo Vera	Karen Duarte (renunció); Leticia Cáceres (asumió el título)	
2012	Egni Eckert	Fiorella Migliore	Nicole Huber	Alexandra Fretes	
2011	Alba Riquelme	Nicole Huber	Stephanía Stegman	Alexandra Fretes	
2010	Yohana Benítez	Egni Eckert	María José Paredes	—N/a	
2009	Mareike Baumgarten	Tamara Sosa	Romina Bogado	—N/a	
2008	Giannina Rufinelli	Gabriela Rejala	Marilé Barrios	—N/a	
2007	María José Maldonado	María de la Paz Vargas	Daiana Ferreira-Acosta	—N/a	
2006	Lourdes Arévalos	—N/a		—N/a	
2005	Karina Buttner	Emilse Gómez	—N/a	Tania Domanickzy	
2004	Yanina González	Tania Domanickzy	—N/a	Yanina González	

== Titleholders under Reinas del Paraguay ==
=== Miss Universe Paraguay ===
- : Declared as Winner
- : Ended as runner-up or Top 5/6
- : Ended as one of the finalists or semifinalists
- : Ended as special awards winner

Between 1957 and 2001 the winners of Miss Paraguay contest went to Miss Universe. Began in 2004 the new management of Promociones Gloria from Bolivia takes over Miss Universe franchise for Paraguay. The winner of Reinas de Belleza del Paraguay goes to Miss Universe pageant. On occasion, when the winner does not qualify (due to age) for either contest, a runner-up is sent.

Year	Department	Miss Universe Paraguay	Placement at Miss Universe	Special Awards
2027	TBA	TBA	TBA	
2026	Distrito Capital	Gretha Milagros Estigarribia Matiauda	TBA	
2025	Distrito Capital	Yanina Magalí Anahí Gómez Ojeda	Top 30	
2024	Distrito Capital	Claudia Naomi Méndez	Unplaced	
2023	Cordillera	Elicena Andrada Orrego	Unplaced	
2022	Guairá	Lía Aymara "Leah" Duarte Ashmore	Unplaced	
2021	Guairá	Nadia Tamara Ferreira	1st Runner-Up	
2020	Distrito Capital	Vanessa Castro Guillén	Unplaced	
2019	Alto Paraná	Ketlin Lottermann Bazzo	Unplaced	
2018	Cordillera	María Belén Alderete Gayoso	Unplaced	
2017	Amambay	Ariela Teresa Machado Peralta	Unplaced	
2016	Guairá	Lourdes Andrea Melgarejo González	Unplaced	
2015	Distrito Capital	Myriam Carolina Arévalos Villalba	Unplaced	
Nuestra Belleza del Paraguay
2014	Amambay	Sally Luz Jara Dávalos	Unplaced	
2013	Distrito Capital	María Guadalupe González Talavera	Unplaced	
Miss Universo Paraguay
2012	Central	Egni Analia Almirón Eckert	Unplaced	
2011	Presidente Hayes	Alba Riquelme Valenzuela	Unplaced	
2010	Central	Yohana Benitez Olmedo	Unplaced	
2009	Central	Mareike Baumgarten Oroa	Unplaced	
Bellezas Paraguaya
2008	Distrito Capital	Giannina Rufinelli Rojas	Unplaced	
Miss Universo Paraguay
2007	Boquerón	María José Maldonado Gómez	Unplaced	
2006	Alto Paraguay	Lourdes Verónica Arévalos Elías	3rd Runner-Up	
2005	Itapúa	Karina Rebecca Buttner Naumann	Unplaced	
2004	Alto Paraguay	Yanina Alicia González Jorgge	3rd Runner-Up	
Miss Paraguay
Did not compete between 2002—2003
2001	Caazapá	Rosmary Benítez	Unplaced	
2000	Alto Paraná	Carolina Ramírez Franco	Unplaced	
1999	San Pedro	Carmen Morínigo Machuca	Unplaced	
1998	Ñeembucú	Luz Marina González Ruíz	Unplaced	
1997	Cordillera	Rossana Elizabeth Jiménez Pereira	Unplaced	
1996	Distrito Capital	Martha Lovera Parquét	Unplaced	
1995	Distrito Capital	Bettina Rosmary Barboza Caffetena	Unplaced	
1994	Presidente Hayes	Lilian Noemí González Mena	Unplaced	
1993	Itapúa	Carolina Barrios	Unplaced	
1992	Boquerón	Pamela Zarza Enríquez	Unplaced	Best National Costume
1991	Distrito Capital	Vivian Rosana Benítez Brizuela	Top 10	Best National Costume (1st Runner-up)
1990	Alto Paraguay	Monica Plate Cano	Unplaced	
1989	Paraguarí	Ana Victoria Schaerer Del Puerto	Unplaced	
1988	Canindeyú	Marta Noemi Acosta Granada	Unplaced	
1987	Itapúa	Tammy Elizabeth Ortigoza Sonneborn	Unplaced	
1986	Distrito Capital	Johana Kelner Toja	Unplaced	
1985	Distrito Capital	Beverly Ocampo Gadea	Unplaced	
1984	Guairá	Elena Ortiz Allegretti	Unplaced	
Did not compete between 1982—1983
1981	Cordillera	Maria Isabel Urizar Caras	Unplaced	Miss Congeniality
1980	Did not compete			
1979	Distrito Capital	Patricia Lohman Bernie	Unplaced	
1978	Distrito Capital	Rosa Maria Duarte Melgarejo	Unplaced	
1977	Distrito Capital	Maria Leticia Zarza Perriet	Unplaced	
1976	Central	Nidia Fátima Cardenas	Unplaced	
1975	Alto Paraná	Susana Beatriz Vire Ferreira	Unplaced	
1974	Alto Paraguay	Maria Angela Zulema Medina Monjagata	Unplaced	
1973	Concepción	Teresita Maria Cano	Unplaced	
1972	Central	Maria Stella Volpe Martinez	Unplaced	
1971	Did not compete			
1970	Paraguarí	Teresa Mercedes Britez Sullow	Unplaced	
Did not compete between 1968—1969
1967	Presidente Hayes	Maria Eugenia Torres	Unplaced	
1966	Alto Paraguay	Mirtha Martinez	Unplaced	
1965	Gran Chaco	Stella Castell	Unplaced	
1964	Distrito Capital	Miriam Riart Brugada	Top 15	
1963	Central	Amelia Benitez	Unplaced	
1962	Alto Paraguay	Corina Rollon	Unplaced	
1961	Distrito Capital	Maria Cristina Osnaghi	Unplaced	
1960	Distrito Capital	Mercedes Ruggia	Unplaced	
1959	Did not compete			
1958	Alto Paraguay	Graciela Scorza	Unplaced	
1957	Caaguazú	Lucy Montanero	Unplaced	

=== Miss Mundo Paraguay ===
- : Declared as Winner
- : Ended as runner-up or top 5/6 qualification
- : Ended as one of the finalists or semifinalists
- : Ended as special awards winner

The second title of Reinas de Belleza del Paraguay represents her country at Miss World. In recent years the Miss Mundo Paraguay holds to choose a Miss World Paraguay winner in separate formation but is in the one contest of Reinas de Belleza del Paraguay pageant.

Year	Department	Miss Mundo Paraguay	Placement at Miss World	Special Awards
2027	TBA	TBA	TBA	
2026	Distrito Capital	Ayelén Pérez	Unplaced	
2025	Distrito Capital	Yanina Magalí Anahí Gómez Ojeda	Unplaced	
2024	No competition held			
2023	Distrito Capital	Dahiana Ayelen Benítez Gatzke	Unplaced	
2022	Miss World 2021 was rescheduled to 16 March 2022 due to the COVID-19 pandemic outbreak in Puerto Rico, no edition started in 2022			
2021	Franco	Bethania Belén Borba Rodríguez	Top 40	Head to Head Challenge (Winner)
2020	Due to the impact of COVID-19 pandemic, no competition held			
2019	Distrito Capital	Araceli Beatriz Bobadilla Candia	Top 40	Head to Head Challenge (Winner); Miss World Talent (Top 27)
2018	Distrito Capital	Maquenna Gaiarín Díaz	Unplaced	Miss World Talent (Top 18)
2017	Alto Paraná	Paola Oberladstatter Arce	Unplaced	Miss World Talent (Top 20)
2016	Alto Paraná	Simone Patricia Freitag Krutzman	Unplaced	
2015	Distrito Capital	Giovanna Estéfani Cordeiro Villalba	Unplaced	Miss World Talent (3rd Runner-up)
Paraguayan Representatives from Nuestra Belleza del Paraguay
2014	Distrito Capital	Myriam Carolina Arévalos Villalba	Unplaced	
2013	Central	Coral Ruiz Reyes	Unplaced	
Paraguayan Representatives from Miss Universo Paraguay
2012	Distrito Capital	Fiorella Migliore Llanes	Unplaced	
2011	Ñeembucú	Nicole Elizabeth Huber Vera	Top 20	
2010	Central	Egni Analia Almirón Eckert	Top 25	
2009	Canindeyú	Tamara Sosa Zapattini	Unplaced	
Paraguayan Representatives from Belleza Paraguaya
2008	Central	Gabriela Mercedes Rejala Llanes	Unplaced	
Paraguayan Representatives from Miss Universo Paraguay
2007	Distrito Capital	María de la Paz Vargas Morinigo	Unplaced	
2006	Did not compete			
2005	Presidente Hayes	Emilse Gómez	Did not compete	
2004	Distrito Capital	Tania María Domanickzy Vargas	Unplaced	
Miss Mundo Paraguay — official selection
2003	Itapúa	Karina Rebeca Buttner Naumann	Unplaced	
Paraguayan Representatives from Miss Paraguay
Did not compete between 2001—2002
2000	—	Patricia Villanueva Distefano	Unplaced	
1999	—	Mariela Candia Ramos	Unplaced	
1998	—	Perla Carolina Benitez Gonzáles	Unplaced	
1997	—	Mariela Quiñónez García	Unplaced	
1996	Distrito Capital	Maria Ingrid Götze Scheunemann	Unplaced	
1995	—	Patricia Serafini Geoghegan	Unplaced	
1994	—	Jannyne Elena Peyrat Scolari	Unplaced	
1993	Distrito Capital	Claudia Florentín Fariña	Unplaced	
1992	—	Lourdes Magdalena Zaracho	Unplaced	
1991	Distrito Capital	Vivian Rosanna Benítez Brizuela	Unplaced	
1990	—	Alba Maria Cordero Rivals	Unplaced	
1989	—	Alicia Maria Jaime Villamayor	Unplaced	
1988	—	Maria José Miranda	Unplaced	
1987	—	Lourdes Beatriz Stanley Baranda	Unplaced	
1986	Amambay	Verónica América Angulo Ahcinelli	Unplaced	
1985	Distrito Capital	Daisy Patricia Ferreira Caballero	Top 15	
1984	—	Susana Maria Ivansiuten Haurelechen	Unplaced	
1983	—	Antonella Filartiga Montuori	Unplaced	
1982	—	Zulema Dominguez Gutter	Unplaced	
1981	Did not compete			
1980	—	Celia Noemi Schaerer	Unplaced	
1979	—	Martha Maria Galli Romanach	Unplaced	
1978	—	Susana Del Pilar Galli	Unplaced	
1977	—	Maria Elizabeth Giardina	Unplaced	Miss Personality
1976	—	Maria Cristina Fernández Samaniego	Unplaced	
Did not compete between 1973—1975
1972	—	Rosa Angelica Mussi	Unplaced	
1971	—	Rosa Maria Duarte Melgarejo	Unplaced	
1970	Did not compete			
1969	—	Blanca Zaldivar	Unplaced	
Did not compete between 1960—1968
1959	—	Elvira dos Santos Encina	Unplaced	

=== Miss Internacional Paraguay ===
- : Declared as Winner
- : Ended as runner-up or top 5/6 qualification
- : Ended as one of the finalists or semifinalists
- : Ended as special awards winner

The third title of Reinas de Belleza del Paraguay represents her country at Miss International. In recent years Miss Internacional paraguay awarded to 1st Runner-up when the license does not group to Big Four pageants. As tradition Top 3 will be sent to Miss Universe, Miss World and Miss International respectively.

Year	Department	Miss Internacional Paraguay	Placement at Miss International	Special Awards
2026	Alto Paraná	Bárbara Vázquez	Did not compete	
2025	Itapúa	Ayhelen Ríos	Unplaced	
2024	Itapúa	Jimena Sosa Martínez	Unplaced	
2023	Distrito Capital	Jazmín de la Sierra	Unplaced	
2022	Distrito Capital	Ariane Maciel	Unplaced	
Due to the impact of COVID-19 pandemic, no competition held between 2020―2021
2019	Central	Elida Raquela Lezcano Giménez	Unplaced	
2018	Paraguarí	Daisy Diana Lezcano Rojas	Top 15	
2017	Itapúa	Fátima Tatiana Rolín Trombetta	Unplaced	
2016	Did not compete			
2015	Canindeyú	Mónica Mariani Pascualotto	Unplaced	
Paraguayan Representatives from Nuestra Belleza del Paraguay
2014	Distrito Capital	Jessica Servin	Unplaced	
2013	Caaguazú	María Marta Raviolo Vera	Unplaced	
Paraguayan Representatives from Miss Universo Paraguay
2012	Ñeembucú	Nicole Elizabeth Huber Vera	4th Runner-up	
2011	Caazapá	Stephania Vázquez Stegman	Unplaced	
2010	Distrito Capital	María José Paredes	Unplaced	
2009	Presidente Hayes	Cristina Romina Bogado Cáceres	Unplaced	
Paraguayan Representatives from Belleza Paraguaya
2008	San Pedro	Rossana Galeano	Unplaced	
Paraguayan Representative from Miss Universo Paraguay
2007	Misiones	Daiana Natalia Ferreira da Costa	Unplaced	
Miss Paraguay — National selection
2006	Did not compete			
2005	Distrito Capital	Liz Santacruz Amarilla	Unplaced	
Paraguayan Representatives from Miss Paraguay
Did not compete between 1999—2004
1998	—	Maria Fabiola Roig Escandriolo	Unplaced	
1997	—	Martha Graciela Maldonado	Unplaced	
1996	—	Claudia Rocío Melgarejo	Unplaced	
1995	—	Patricia Viviana Galindo Cabral	Unplaced	
1994	—	Jannyne Elena Peyrat Scolari	Unplaced	Best National Costume
Did not compete between 1992—1993
1991	—	Maria Luján Oviedo	Unplaced	
1990	Did not compete			
1989	—	Alba Maria Cordero Rivals	Unplaced	
Did not compete between 1964—1988
1963	—	Maria Elena Quesada	Unplaced	
1962	—	Gloria Alderete Irala	Unplaced	
1961	—	Gladys Fernández	Top 15	Best Evening Gown
1960	—	Gretel Hedger Carvallo	Top 15	

=== Miss Tierra Paraguay ===
- : Declared as Winner
- : Ended as runner-up or top 5/6 qualification
- : Ended as one of the finalists or semifinalists
- : Ended as special awards winner

Since 2002 the Promociones Gloria from Bolivia takes over Miss Earth franchise for Paraguay. The runner-up or even winner may compete at the Miss Earth but traditionally the third runner-up went to Miss Earth pageant. Nowadays after a new formation debuted the representative of Paraguay at Miss Earth will be designated to one of runners-up of Reinas de Belleza del Paraguay.

Year	Department	Miss Tierra Paraguay	Placement at Miss Earth	Special Awards
2024	Did not compete			
2023	Distrito Capital	Gretha Matiauda	Unplaced	
2022	Distrito Capital	Macarena Tomas	Did not compete	
2021	Canindeyú	Evelyn Andrade	Unplaced	
2020	Alto Paraná	Natalhia Escobar	Unplaced	
2019	Alto Paraná	Jociani Daysi Repossi Da Silva	Unplaced	(gold) Miss Friendship (Water)
2018	Amambay	Larissa Dominguez	Unplaced	
2017	Itapúa	Valeria Ivasiuten	Unplaced	(bronze) National Costume (South America)
2016	Central	Vanessa Alexandra Ramirez	Unplaced	
2015	Guairá	Lourdes Andrea Melgarejo González	Unplaced	
Paraguayan Representatives from Miss Universo Paraguay
2014	Distrito Capital	Sendy Cáceres	Unplaced	Miss Hannah's Beach Resort; Best in Evening Gown; Tropical Beauty of the Night; (gold) Cocktail Wear; (gold) Resort Wear; (silver) Best Teacher
2013	Central	Leticia Cáceres	Unplaced	Best Talent (Top 15)
Paraguayan Representatives from Belleza Paraguaya
2012	Amambay	Alexandra Fretes	Unplaced	Miss Earth Hamilo Coast; (gold) M.E Sponsored Swimsuit Parade; (gold) M.E Official Swimsuit Competition
2011	Ñeembucú	Nicole Elizabeth Huber Vera	Top 16	
2010	Did not compete			
2009	Central	Gabriela Rejala	Top 16	
Paraguayan Representatives from Miss Universo Paraguay
2008	—	Yeruti García	Unplaced	
Paraguayan Representatives from Miss Paraguay
2007	—	Griselda Monserrat Quevedo Chávez	Unplaced	
2006	—	Paloma Navarro	Unplaced	
2005	Distrito Capital	Tania María Domaniczky Vargas	Top 8	
2004	Alto Paraguay	Yanina Alicia González Jorgge	Miss Fire (3rd Runner-up)	Best in Swimsuit
Miss Earth Paraguay — official selection
2003	Did not compete			
2002	—	Adriana Raquel Baum Ramos	Unplaced	
