= Nuestra Belleza Paraguay 2015 =

- Date: September 21, 2015
- Presenters: Egny Eckert; Paola Hermann
- Venue: Yacht & Golf Club Paraguayo, Asunción, Paraguay
- Entrants: 4
- Winner: Laura Garcete

The Nuestra Belleza Paraguay 2015 pageant was held on September 21, 2015. Sally Jara, Miss Universo Paraguay 2014, crowned her successor Laura Garcete at the end of the event; she was the Paraguayan candidate for the 2015 Miss Universe pageant. Elected to represent Paraguay at Miss World 2015 was Giovanna Cordeiro, for Miss International 2015 was Mónica Mariani, and for Miss Earth 2015 was Myriam Arévalos. The pageant was not broadcast live for the first time in a long time.

== Results ==
| Placement | Contestant |
|---|---|
| Miss Universe Paraguay 2015 | Laura Garcete* (Dethroned) |
| Miss Universe Paraguay 2015 | Myriam Arévalos |
| Miss World Paraguay 2015 | Giovanna Cordeiro |
| Miss International Paraguay 2015 | Mónica Mariani |
| Miss Earth Paraguay 2015 | Andrea Melgarejo |

*Laura Garcete, was dethroned as the winner as a result of her pregnancy. Myriam Arévalos was appointed by the organization to compete at Miss Universe 2015.

== Judges ==
The following persons judged the final competition.

- Federico Duarte Macchi
- María José Maldonado
- Mariela Candia
- Darío Jara
- and some sponsors directors

== See also ==
- Miss Paraguay
