= Nuestra Belleza Paraguay 2013 =

- Date: June 27, 2013
- Presenters: Paola Hermann; Alicia González
- Venue: Yacht & Golf Club Paraguayo, Asunción, Paraguay
- Broadcaster: LaTele
- Entrants: 19
- Placements: 10
- Winner: MU: Guadalupe González; MW: Coral Ruiz; MI: Marta Raviolo; ME: Karen Duarte
- Congeniality: Laetitia Espinoza
- Photogenic: Estela Maris López

The Nuestra Belleza Paraguay 2013 pageant was held at the Yacht & Golf Club Paraguayo on June 27, 2013 to select Paraguayan representatives to the 4 major beauty pageants. Egny Eckert, Miss Universe Paraguay 2012, Fiorella Migiore, Miss World Paraguay 2012, Nicole Huber, Miss International Paraguay 2012, and Alexandra Fretes, Miss Earth Paraguay 2012, crowned their successors, Guadalupe Gonzalez, Coral Ruiz, Marta Raviolo and Karen Duarte, respectively. This is the first time that the pageant was broadcast on LaTele, with new franchises holders, Salvador Mass and Isabel Mussi, and with a new name, 'Nuestra Belleza'.

== Results ==
=== Placements ===
Placement	Contestant
Miss Universo Paraguay 2013	Guadalupe González
Miss Mundo Paraguay 2013	Coral Ruiz Reyes
Miss International Paraguay 2013	Marta Raviolo
Miss Earth Paraguay 2013	Karen Duarte*
Miss Continentes Unidos Paraguay 2013	Laura Garcete
Miss Turismo Internacional Paraguay 2013	Zulma Galeano
Miss Tourism Queen of the Year Paraguay 2013	Daisy Lezcano
Reina de la Piña Paraguay 2013	Agustina Mendoza
1st Runner-Up	Leticia Cáceres*
2nd Runner-Up	Liliana Fragueda

* Karen Duarte later withdrew for health reasons. The 1st runner-up, Leticia Cáceres, replaced her at Miss Earth 2013.

== Contestants notes ==
- Candidates # 4 and # 9, Coral and Paloma Ruiz Reyes, are siblings.
- Candidate # 4, Coral Ruiz Reyes, previously joined Miss Universo Paraguay 2011 where she finished as 1st Runner-up, she later represented her country at Miss Tourism Queen of The Year Internacional 2012 held in China.
- Candidate # 5, Guadalupe González, already represented Paraguay at Miss Atlántico International 2012 and Miss Latinoamérica 2012, held in Punta del Este, Uruguay, and Panama City, Panama, respectively.
- Candidate # 13, Daisy Lezcano, previously joined Miss Paraguay 2012 and she took the Miss Model of the World Paraguay crown.
- Candidate # 10, Marcela Benegas, previously joined Miss Universo Paraguay 2008 but she did not placed.

=== Representation ===
After the pageant, the following contestants represented Paraguay in these international contests:

Candidate	Contest	Date	Place	Placement
Agustina Mendoza	Reina Mundial de la Piña 2013	July 7, 2013	Bucaramanga, Colombia	Winner
Laura Garcete	Miss United Continent 2013	September 14, 2013	Guayaquil, Ecuador	Didn't place
Coral Ruiz	Miss World 2013	September 28, 2013	Bali, Indonesia	Didn't place
Guadalupe González	Miss Universe 2013	November 9, 2013	Moscow, Russia	Didn't place
Paloma Ruiz	Miss Model of the World 2013	November 20, 2013	Shenzhen, China	Didn't place
Leticia Cáceres	Miss Earth 2013	December 7, 2013	Manila, Philippines	Didn't place
Guadalupe González	Reina Hispanoamericana 2013	December 12, 2013	Santa Cruz, Bolivia	5th runner-up
Marta Raviolo	Miss International 2013	December 17, 2013	Tokyo, Japan	Didn't place
Zulma Galeano	Miss Tourism International 2013	December 31, 2013	Kuala Lumpur, Malaysia	Didn't place

== Judges ==
The following persons judged the final competition:

- Bettina Barboza de Ray, Miss Paraguay 1995
- Luis Carlos Adler Benítez
- Daiana Da Costa Ferreira, Miss Internacional Paraguay 2007
- Juan José Martínez
- Arnaldo Samaniego, mayor of the city of Asunción
- Carlos Aviles
- Vivian Benítez, Miss Paraguay 1991
- Robert Aveiro
- José Espínola, stylist
- Federico Duarte Macchi

== See also ==
- Miss Paraguay
- Miss Universe 2013
- Miss World 2013
- Miss International 2013
- Miss Earth 2013
- Miss United Continent 2013
