= Miss Paraguay 2007 =

- Date: March 17, 2007
- Presenters: Dani Da Rosa & Melisa Quiñónez
- Venue: Municipal Theatre Ignacio A. Pane
- Broadcaster: Telefuturo
- Entrants: 18
- Winner: María José Maldonado; Boquerón

The Miss Paraguay 2007 pageant was won by María José Maldonado. In took place on 17 March 2007 at the Municipal Theatre Ignacio A. Pane in Asunción, Paraguay. 18 delegates competed for the title, previously held by Lourdes Arévalos. The pageant was broadcast live on Telefuturo.

== Results ==
Final results	Contestant
Miss Paraguay 2007	Boquerón - María José Maldonado
Miss Mundo Paraguay	Distrito Capital - Maripa Vargas
Miss Paraguay Internacional	Misiones - Daiana Ferreira-Acosta
1st Runner-up	San Pedro - Jéssica Argüello
2nd Runner-up	Itapúa - Analía Marecos
Top 10	Cordillera - Dahiana Diarte-Núñez; Ñeembucú - Florencia Garcete; Paraguarí - María José Morínigo; Alto Paraguay - Andrea Álvarez; Guairá - Alana Calvó

== Delegates ==
Department	Contestant	Age	Height	Hometown
Alto Paraguay	Andrea Álvarez	18	1.80 m (5 ft 11 in)	Fuerte Olimpo
Alto Paraná	Nicole Fragnaud	22	1.73 m (5 ft 8 in)	Ciudad del Este
Amambay	Viviana Figueredo	24	1.72 m (5 ft 7 1/2 in)	Asunción
Boquerón	María José Maldonado	21	1.76 m (5 ft 9 1/2 in)	Filadelfia
Caaguazú	Rossana Mendoza	24	1.73 m (5 ft 8 in)	Asunción
Caazapá	Yerutí García	25	1.74 m (5 ft 8 1/2 in)	Ñemby
Canindeyú	Carina Íñiguez	25	1.72 m (5 ft 7 1/2 in)	Ñemby
Central	Carolina Noguera	20	1.80 m (5 ft 11 in)	Mariano Roque Alonso
Concepción	Laura Vera	26	1.75 m (5 ft 9 in)	Concepción
Cordillera	Dahiana Diarte-Núñez	18	1.77 m (5 ft 9 1/2 in)	Lambaré
Distrito Capital	María de la Paz Vargas	19	1.75 m (5 ft 9 in)	Asunción
Guairá	Alana Calvó	20	1.72 m (5 ft 7 1/2 in)	Capiatá
Itapúa	Analía Marecos	19	1.78 m (5 ft 10 in)	Asunción
Misiones	Daiana Ferreira-Acosta	22	1.73 m (5 ft 8 in)	San Juan Bautista
Ñeembucú	Florencia Garcete	24	1.79 m (5 ft 10 1/2 in)	Pilar
Paraguarí	María José Morínigo	25	1.83 m (6 ft 0 in)	Paraguarí
Presidente Hayes	Patricia Villanueva	20	1.81 m (5 ft 11 1/2 in)	Asunción
San Pedro	Jéssica Argüello	23	1.74 m (5 ft 8 1/2 in)	Ciudad del Este

== Judges ==
The following persons judged the final competition.

- Evanhy de Gallegos
- Liz Crámer
- Miguel Martin
- Yanina González (Miss Universo Paraguay 2004)
- Marithé Rasmussen
- Sannie López Garelli
- Tacho Rojas

== See also ==
- Miss Paraguay
