= Miss Universo Paraguay 2005 =

- Date: March 12, 2005
- Presenters: Rubén Rodríguez
- Venue: Yacht & Golf Club Paraguayo
- Broadcaster: Telefuturo
- Entrants: 22
- Winner: Karina Buttner; Itapúa

The Miss Paraguay 2005 pageant was held in Asunción, Paraguay. The pageant was won by Karina Buttner of Asunción, who was crowned by outgoing queen Yanina Alicia González Jorgge. The pageant was broadcast live on Telefuturo from the Yacht & Golf Club Paraguayo.

== Results ==
Final results	Contestant
Miss Paraguay 2005	Itapúa - Karina Buttner
Miss Mundo Paraguay 2005	Presidente Hayes - Emilse Gómez
1st Runner-up	Boquerón - Paloma Navarro
2nd Runner-up	Central - Rosanna Beltrán
3rd Runner-up	Alto Paraguay - Rossana Urunaga
4th Runner-up	San Pedro - Sara Pineda
Top 12	Alto Paraná - Ilsa Santos; Amambay - Diana Camarassa; Distrito Capital - Leidy Godoy; Guairá - Sandra Echagüe; Misiones - Natalia Candia; Paraguarí - Angie Centurion

== Delegates ==
Department	Contestant	Age	Height	Hometown
Alto Paraguay	Rossana Urunaga	24	1.74 m (5 ft 8 1/2 in)	Asunción
Alto Paraná	Ilsa Santos	22	1.79 m (5 ft 10 1/2 in)	Ciudad del Este
Amambay	Diana Camarassa	21	1.80 m (5 ft 11 in)	Pedro Juan Caballero
Amazonas	Sandra Pérez	18	1.79 m (5 ft 10 1/2 in)	Asunción
Asunción	María Karina López	19	1.80 m (5 ft 11 in)	Asunción
Boquerón	Paloma Navarro	20	1.72 m (5 ft 7 1/2 in)	Asunción
Caaguazú	Leticia García	18	1.75 m (5 ft 9 in)	Asunción
Caazapá	Sofía Rodríguez	18	1.73 m (5 ft 8 in)	Asunción
Canindeyú	María del Carmen Sosa	18	1.86 m (6 ft 1 in)	Ciudad del Este
Central	Rossana Beltrán	18	1.73 m (5 ft 8 in)	Itá
Concepción	Lariza Mendoza	20	1.80 m (5 ft 11 in)	Asunción
Cordillera	Fanny Pérez	18	1.75 m (5 ft 9 in)	Caacupé
Distrito Capital	Leidy Godoy	19	1.80 m (5 ft 11 in)	Asunción
Gran Chaco	Cynthia Mecchinni	26	1.77 m (5 ft 9 1/2 in)	Asunción
Guairá	Sandra Echagüe	20	1.81 m (5 ft 11 1/2 in)	Asunción
Itapúa	Karina Buttner	22	1.79 m (5 ft 10 1/2 in)	Asunción
Misiones	Natalia Candia	18	1.71 m (5 ft 7 1/2 in)	San Lorenzo
Ñeembucú	Carolina Delgado	18	1.83 m (6 ft 0 in)	Luque
Paraguarí	Angie Centurion	18	1.72 m (5 ft 7 1/2 in)	Asunción
Presidente Hayes	Emilce Gómez	23	1.75 m (5 ft 9 in)	San Lorenzo
San Pedro	Sara Pineda	19	1.72 m (5 ft 7 1/2 in)	Luque
Tebicuary	Paola Tejeda	25	1.82 m (5 ft 11 1/2 in)	Fernando de la Mora

== Background Music ==
- Los Nocheros

== See also ==
- Miss Paraguay
