= Amilcar Ferreira =

Paraguayan economist and politician (born 1971)

Amilcar Ferreira Acosta (born May 9, 1971) is a Paraguayan economist and politician. He is a member of the Encuentro Nacional party in Paraguay. Ferreira was a candidate for senator in 2022.

== Early life ==
He was born in Yuty, Caazapá. He studied at the Universidad Nacional de Asuncion and the Organization of American States. He graduated with a master's degree in business administration from the INCAE Business School.

== Professional life ==
He has a consulting firm, named Consultora SEI-Soluciones Empresariales Inteligentes.

=== Economist ===
As an economist, he has had his opinion on several economy subjects published. For example, he thinks that Paraguay's middle-class does not have a unique definition.

In 2016, he was of the opinion that Venezuela had a legitimate claim over some payments that Paraguay owed Venezuela's government-owned petrol company, PDVSA.

Other subjects that he has touched upon publicly as an economist are the ongoing situation involving Petropar, a Paraguayan petrol company, and their buying oil at cheaper prices: "I hope they (the sellers) are not lying to Petropar's president", he expressed in September 2023.

Ferreira has in the past been optimistic about Paraguay's economic future. His opinion about the country's economy for 2023 was a positive one, as he expected it to improve due to an increase in production in the South American country.

=== Political career ===
According to him, Ferreira was invited to a meeting by three politicians, Soledad Núňez, Fernando Camacho and Kattya González, to join their party and run for senator.

== Personal life ==
Ferreira is married and has two kids.

== See also ==
- List of Paraguayans
