= Miss Paraguay 2011 =

Beauty pageant edition

- Date: June 23, 2011
- Presenters: Mili Britez; Yanina González
- Venue: Telefuturo's Main Studio
- Broadcaster: Telefuturo
- Entrants: 15
- Winner: Alba Riquelme; Presidente Hayes
- Photogenic: Coral Ruiz

The Miss Universo Paraguay 2011 pageant was held on June 23, 2011. Yohana Benítez, Miss Universo Paraguay 2010; Egni Eckert, Miss Mundo Paraguay 2010; and María José Paredes, Miss Internacional Paraguay 2010, crowned her successors Alba Riquelme, Nicole Huber and Stephanía Vázquez at the end of the event. The winners have the right to represent Paraguay in the 3 major international beauty pageants, Miss Universe 2011, Miss World 2011 and Miss International 2011. The pageant was broadcast live on Telefuturo.

== Results ==
=== Placements ===
Placement	Contestant
Miss Paraguay 2011	Presidente Hayes – Alba Riquelme
Miss Mundo Paraguay 2011	Ñeembucú – Nicole Huber
Miss International Paraguay 2011	Caazapá – Stephania Stegman
Miss Earth Paraguay 2011	Amambay – Alexandra Fretes
Top 8	Canindeyú – Majandra Zaldivar; Boquerón - Coral Ruiz; Alto Paraná – Lourdes Motta; Cordillera – Leticia Patiño

=== Special awards ===
The special awards were given during the "Gala de la Belleza" event held on June 19, 2011, at Hotel Guaraní Esplendor.

Special Award	Candidate
Miss Fotogénica (Miss Photogenic)	Coral Ruiz
Miss Silueta (Best Body)	Alexandra Fretes
Miss Elegancia (Miss Elegance)	Coral Ruiz
Miss Talento Day's (Miss Talent)	Nicole Huber
Miss Aerosur (Miss Aerosur)	Nicole Huber
Miss Pelo Sedal (Best Hair)	Alba Riquelme

== Delegates ==
There are 15 official contestants.

Represented	Candidates	Height (cm)	Age	Hometown
Alto Paraguay	Rosci Luz Mendoza Chaparro	19	1.76 m (5 ft 9 1/2 in)	Coronel Oviedo
Alto Paraná	Lourdes María del Carmen Motta Rolón	18	1.72 m (5 ft 7 1/2 in)	Ciudad del Este
Amambay	Alexandra Helena Fretes Galeano	23	1.79 m (5 ft 10 1/2 in)	Asunción
Boquerón	Coral Margarita Ruiz Reyes	23	1.74 m (5 ft 8 1/2 in)	Luque
Caazapá	Stephanía Sofía Vázquez Stegman	18	1.80 m (5 ft 11 in)	Asunción
Canindeyú	María Alejandra Zaldivar Rojas	23	1.83 m (6 ft 0 in)	Asunción
Central	Mariela Magdalena Mora Roa	18	1.75 m (5 ft 9 in)	Luque
Cordillera	Myrian Leticia Patiño Argüello	21	1.73 m (5 ft 8 in)	Asunción
Distrito Capital	Nadia Yasmine Servian	22	1.77 m (5 ft 9 1/2 in)	Asunción
Guairá	Karina Gizelle Arguello Szabo	19	1.76 m (5 ft 9 1/2 in)	Paraguarí
Itapúa	Daisy Eliana Sanabria Benítez	20	1.77 m (5 ft 9 1/2 in)	Encarnación
Ñeembucú	Nicole Elizabeth Huber Vera	20	1.79 m (5 ft 10 1/2 in)	Asunción
Paraguarí	María Angela Recalde Ramírez	18	1.78 m (5 ft 10 in)	Yaguarón
Presidente Hayes	Alba Lucía Riquelme Valenzuela	20	1.81 m (5 ft 11 1/2 in)	Asunción
San Pedro	Giselle María Alice Meyer Meza	21	1.74 m (5 ft 8 1/2 in)	San Lorenzo

== Judges ==
The following persons judged the final competition.

- Ignacio Kliche
- Salvador Mas
- Mariángela Martínez
- Tania Domaniczky
- María Eugenia Torres
- Hugo González
- Humberto Gilardini

== See also ==
- Miss Paraguay

== Notes ==
- Alexandra Fretes was chosen Miss Expo 2009, she also represented Paraguay at the 2010 Miss Supranational Pageant held in Płock, Poland.
- Lourdes Motta is the only delegate chosen in a preliminary competition, she won Miss Ciudad del Este 2010.
