= Belén Alderete =

Paraguayan model and beauty pageant titleholder

- Born: María Belén Alderete Gayoso; 14 June 1994 (age 32); Caacupé, Paraguay
- Height: 1.70 m (5 ft 7 in)
- Beauty pageant titleholder
- Title: Miss Universo Paraguay 2018
- Hair color: Blonde
- Eye color: Brown
- Major competitions: Reinas de Belleza del Paraguay 2018 (Winner); Reina Hispanoamericana 2018 (2nd Runner-up); Miss Universe 2018 (Unplaced)

María Belén Alderete Gayoso (born 14 June 1994) is a Paraguayan model and beauty pageant titleholder who won the title of Miss Universo Paraguay 2018 at Reinas de Belleza del Paraguay 2018. She represented Paraguay at Miss Universe 2018 pageant in Thailand, and represented Paraguay at Reina Hispanoamericana 2018, held in Santa Cruz, Bolivia, where she finished as the second runner-up.

== Pageantry ==
=== Reinas de Belleza del Paraguay 2018 ===
Alderete representing Cordillera was crowned Miss Universo Paraguay at the Reinas de Belleza del Paraguay 2018 pageant on August 24, 2018, at the Resort Yacht y Golf Club Paraguayo. She was crowned by outgoing titleholder Ariela Machado, Miss Universo Paraguay 2017.

=== Reina Hispanoamericana 2018 ===
After Ana Livieres resigned as Reina Hispanoamericana Paraguay 2018, Alderete was assigned by Promociones Gloria to represent Paraguay at the Reina Hispanoamericana 2018 pageant in Bolivia where she finished as the 2nd Runner-up.

=== Miss Universe 2018 ===
As Miss Universo Paraguay, Alderete represented Paraguay at the Miss Universe 2018 pageant in Thailand. She did not place among the top 20 semifinalists.

Awards and achievements
Preceded by Daisy Lezcano	Reina Hispanoamericana Paraguay; 2018	Incumbent
Preceded by (Venezuela) Victoria D'Ambrosio	Reina Hispanoamericana 2nd Runner-up; 2018	Incumbent
Preceded by Ariela Machado	Miss Universo Paraguay; 2018	Succeeded by Ketlin Lottermann
