= Belleza Paraguaya 2008 =

- Date: April 5, 2008
- Presenters: Rubén Rodríguez & Sannie López Garelli
- Venue: Estudio Principal de Telefuturo, Asunción, Paraguay
- Broadcaster: Telefuturo
- Entrants: 18
- Winner: Gianinna Rufinelli; Distrito Capital

The Miss Paraguay 2008 pageant was held in Asunción, Paraguay. The pageant was won by Gianinna Rufinelli, who was crowned by outgoing queen María José Maldonado. The pageant was broadcast live on Telefuturo from its main studio.

== Results ==
Final results	Contestant
Miss Paraguay 2008	Distrito Capital - Gianinna Rufinelli
Miss Mundo Paraguay	Central - Gabriela Rejala
Miss Internacional Paraguay	Alto Paraná - Marilé Barrios
1st Runner-up	San Pedro - Rossana Galeano
2nd Runner-up	Guairá - Giselle Riveros
Top 10	Misiones - Marcela Benegas; Presidente Hayes - Carolina Paredes; Alto Paraguay - Julia Frison; Caaguazú - Martha Rojas; Concepción - Fabiola Duarte

== Delegates ==
Department	Contestant	Age	Height	Hometown
Alto Paraguay	Julia Frison	20	1.80 m (5 ft 11 in)	Asunción
Alto Paraná	Marilé Barrios	21	1.78 m (5 ft 10 in)	Ciudad del Este
Amambay	Yaninne Dijkhuis	20	1.80 m (5 ft 11 in)	Asunción
Boquerón	Milagros Acosta	19	1.78 m (5 ft 10 in)	Asunción
Caaguazú	Martha Rojas	18	1.80 m (5 ft 11 in)	Asunción
Caazapá	Naida Meza	19	1.72 m (5 ft 7 1/2 in)	San Lorenzo
Canindeyú	Sherley del Valle	18	1.73 m (5 ft 8 in)	Itá
Central	Gabriela Rejala	18	1.75 m (5 ft 9 in)	Ñemby
Concepción	Fabiola Duarte	21	1.73 m (5 ft 8 in)	Asunción
Cordillera	Sophie Klassen	23	1.73 m (5 ft 8 in)	Caacupé
Distrito Capital	Gianinna Rufinelli	20	1.73 m (5 ft 8 in)	Asunción
Guairá	Giselle Riveros	26	1.79 m (5 ft 10 1/2 in)	Luque
Itapúa	Noelia Rolón	20	1.73 m (5 ft 8 in)	Encarnación
Misiones	Marcela Benegas	20	1.77 m (5 ft 9 1/2 in)	Asunción
Ñeembucú	Leticia Sosa	20	1.78 m (5 ft 10 in)	Areguá
Paraguarí	Dina Galeano	22	1.77 m (5 ft 9 1/2 in)	Asunción
Presidente Hayes	Carolina Paredes	23	1.78 m (5 ft 10 in)	Asunción
San Pedro	Rossana Galeano	20	1.74 m (5 ft 8 1/2 in)	Asunción

== Judges ==
The following persons judged the final competition.

- Lourdes Arévalos (Miss Universo Paraguay 2006)
- Armando Rubin
- Sussy Sacco
- Marilyn Candia
- Luis De León
- José Espínola
- Martha Avilés
- Mariela Quiñónez
- Liliana González Mena (Miss Universo Paraguay 1994)
- Pamela Zarza (Miss Universo Paraguay 1992)

== See also ==
- Miss Paraguay
