= Nadia Ferreira =

Paraguayan model (born 1999)

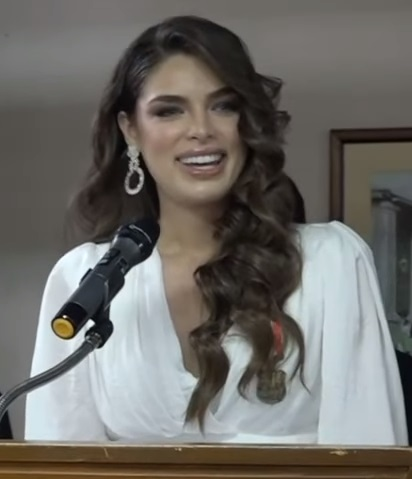
- Ferreira in 2021
- Born: Nadia Tamara Ferreira; 10 May 1999 (age 27); Villarrica, Paraguay
- Education: Universidad Americana
- Occupations: Model; beauty pageant titleholder
- Height: 1.75 m (5 ft 9 in)
- Spouse: Marc Anthony (m. 2023)
- Children: 2
- Beauty pageant titleholder
- Title: Miss Teen Universe Paraguay 2014; Miss Universe Paraguay 2021
- Hair color: Brown
- Eye color: Blue
- Major competitions: Miss Teen Universe 2015 (3rd runner-up); Miss Universe 2021 (1st runner-up)

Nadia Tamara Ferreira (born 10 May 1999) is a Paraguayan fashion model noted for her international modeling career, including appearances at fashion events such as New York Fashion Week, and her association with the modeling agency Wilhelmina Models. She gained further recognition after representing Paraguay in the Miss Universe 2021 competition, finishing as the first runner-up—the highest placement by a Paraguayan contestant in the pageant's history.

Ferreira began her career at the age of thirteen through advertising campaigns and teen beauty pageants, later expanding into television and appearing at fashion events across Latin America, Europe, and the Middle East. Following her participation in Miss Universe, Ferreira continued her modeling career through runway shows, media appearances, and features on the covers of international magazines. She has also worked as a presenter at awards ceremonies, served as a brand ambassador, launched her own fragrance, and participated in philanthropic work supporting children's health and the United Nations Development Programme. In January 2023, she married singer Marc Anthony.

== Early life ==
Nadia Tamara Ferreira was born on 10 May 1999, in Villarrica, Guairá Department, to Ludy Ferreira and physician Rodolfo Ritter. She has an older sister, Eli. Although Ferreira was primarily raised by her mother, she remained close to her father and regularly visited him in Ciudad del Este, where he lived. In addition to her native languages, Spanish and Guaraní, Ferreira is fluent in English, and Portuguese.

As an infant, Ferreira was diagnosed with congenital torticollis and underwent corrective surgery at eight months old. At the age of ten, Ferreira began experiencing neurological symptoms that were initially believed to be caused by multiple sclerosis. Further testing revealed that she had Susac's syndrome. The condition temporarily left her both blind and deaf, and she experienced paralysis on the left side of her body for approximately a year and a half.

Ferreira began modeling at the age of thirteen and moved to Asunción two years later to pursue it professionally. She later studied Business Engineering at Universidad Americana. However, in a 2015 interview, Ferreira stated that she had long aspired to study medicine.

== Career ==
=== Early career and international work (2014–2020) ===
Ferreira began modeling at the age of thirteen, appearing in advertising campaigns before being invited to compete in Miss Teen Universe Paraguay 2014. Representing her hometown of Villarrica, she won the pageant over sixteen other contestants. Ferreira subsequently represented Paraguay at Miss Teen Universe in Guatemala City, where she finished as third runner-up in the final held on 6 February 2015. Later that year, Ferreira joined the Telefuturo television talent show Parodiando. During the competition, Ferreira performed impersonations of Taylor Swift, Tini Stoessel as her character Violetta, Jessie J, Aqua lead singer Lene Nystrøm, and Xuxa. Ferreira remained in the competition until June 2015, when she was eliminated by a public vote.

In 2016, Ferreira signed a two-year contract as the promotional face of the Asunción shopping mall Paseo La Galería and appeared on the cover of the Paseo Magazine. The following year, she became the promotional face of Tigo Guatemala and made her debut at New York Fashion Week in September, walking for the Spanish fashion label Custo Barcelona. Ferreira returned to New York Fashion Week in February 2018 before participating in Santiago Fashion Week in April and Asunción Fashion Week the following month. In September 2018, Ferreira signed with Wilhelmina Models. The following January, Ferreira walked at Qatar Fashion Week and spent several months working in Germany and Turkey throughout 2019. In August 2020, she appeared on the cover of Harper's Bazaar Vietnam, followed by a cover appearance in Glamour Bulgaria in January 2021.

=== Miss Universe 2021 ===
On 31 August 2021, Ferreira was crowned Miss Universe Paraguay, earning the right to represent the country at the Miss Universe 2021 pageant held in Eilat, Israel. On 10 December, she presented her national costume during the preliminary competition. Inspired by the mainumby (hummingbird) and a Guaraní legend, the design carried an environmental awareness message by incorporating recycled materials, including textile waste as well as traditional fabrics such as ñandutí and ao po'i. Its creation involved around thirty people — including artisans and collaborators — working for approximately one month. The outfit featured shades of blue, green, and yellow; it also included two wings and was decorated with LED lights.

During the final competition on 13 December, Ferreira was announced among the sixteen semifinalists out of a total of eighty contestants, becoming the fifth Paraguayan woman to reach that stage. Ferreira then competed in the swimsuit round and advanced to the top ten. At this point, she walked in the evening gown competition wearing a light cyan dress with a cape. Ferreira later progressed to the top five, where Adriana Lima, a member of the judging panel, asked her, "How can women deal with body shaming?" to which she replied:

Our body is our temple, so we must take care of it. Our inner beauty is what really matters. Let us cultivate our inner beauty, so it can reflect our external beauty.

Ferreira then made it into the final three, alongside India's Harnaaz Sandhu and South Africa's Lalela Mswane. In the final round, host Steve Harvey asked her: "What advice would you give to young women watching about how to deal with the pressures they face today?" She responded:

I've been through so many hard situations in my life. But I overc[a]me [them]. So I want all women, all person[s] who [are] watching in this moment, to join forces, to do what you're meant to do, because you can do it. No matter the situation, you can overcome it, and you can always be victorious.

Ferreira ultimately came in second place—as first runner-up—behind Sandhu. This marked the highest placement ever achieved by a Paraguayan contestant in the pageant, surpassing the fourth-place finishes of Yanina González and Lourdes Arévalos in 2004 and 2006, respectively.

On 26 August 2022, Ferreira crowned Leah Ashmore as her successor at the Reinas del Paraguay 2022 pageant, held at Paseo La Galería in Asunción. The following year, on 18 November, she served as a judge for Miss Universe 2023, which took place in San Salvador, El Salvador.

==== Response to her participation ====
After being appointed as Miss Universe Paraguay, the Chamber of Deputies of Paraguay declared Ferreira's participation in the pageant of "national and cultural interest" on 8 September. On 11 November, the Senate honored her with the title of "ambassador of national beauty." The original proposal also included granting her the title of "illustrious citizen," but following a disagreement, a modification was requested to remove that distinction. With this change, the Senate approved the initiative. Additionally, on 7 December, Ferreira was named an "illustrious daughter" of Villarrica, her hometown.

Upon her return to Paraguay after the pageant, she was honored both at Silvio Pettirossi International Airport and in Villarrica. Ferreira was also awarded the title of "beloved daughter of the city of Asunción" by the Municipality of Asunción, which likewise granted her the Municipal Medal of Merit "Domingo Martínez de Irala" in recognition of her participation.

=== 2022-present ===
In January 2022, Ferreira walked for the brand Amato during the Arab Fashion Week (currently known as Dubai Fashion Week), held in Dubai, United Arab Emirates. That same year, she became a brand ambassador for Clear and Samsung. On October 1, Ferreira took part in the opening ceremony of the 2022 South American Games, held in Asunción. The following year, in October, she made her debut as a presenter at the Billboard Latin Music Awards, announcing the "Artist of the Year" category alongside Brazilian model Julia Gama.

In June 2024, Ferreira was named a brand ambassador for Alo Yoga and Bulova. The following year, in August, she launched her first fragrance, titled Dama. Ferreira later worked as a presenter at the Premios Juventud in September 2025 and at the Premios Lo Nuestro in February 2026.

== Philanthropy ==
In May 2022, the United Nations Development Programme (UNDP) Paraguay appointed Ferreira as an ambassador. The following year, in October, the Maestro Cares Foundation—founded by Marc Anthony in 2012—announced the construction of a care center for children with cancer in San Lorenzo. She attended the groundbreaking ceremony in December 2023 and returned for its inauguration in August 2025. One month later, the foundation appointed Ferreira as its global ambassador.

== Personal life ==
From late 2018 to early 2020, Ferreira was in a relationship with Paraguayan businessman Omar Castorino Montanaro, the grandson of Sabino Augusto Montanaro, who served as Minister of the Interior during the dictatorship of Alfredo Stroessner.

In early 2022, she began a relationship with singer Marc Anthony. They became engaged in May of that year and married on 28 January 2023, at the Pérez Art Museum Miami. The couple have two children: Marco, born in June 2023, and Myla, born in July 2026.

Awards and achievements
Preceded by (Brazil) Julia Gama	Miss Universe 1st Runner-Up; 2021	Succeeded by (Venezuela) Amanda Dudamel
Preceded by Vanessa Castro	Miss Universe Paraguay; 2021	Succeeded by Lia Ashmore
