= Elizeche =

Elizeche is a surname. Notable people with the surname include:

- Gloria Elizeche (born c. 1951), also known as Tsiweyenki, Paraguayan indigenous leader
- Orlando Javier Elizeche (born 1987), Paraguayan long-distance runner
