= José Mongelós =

Paraguayan tenor (born 1989)

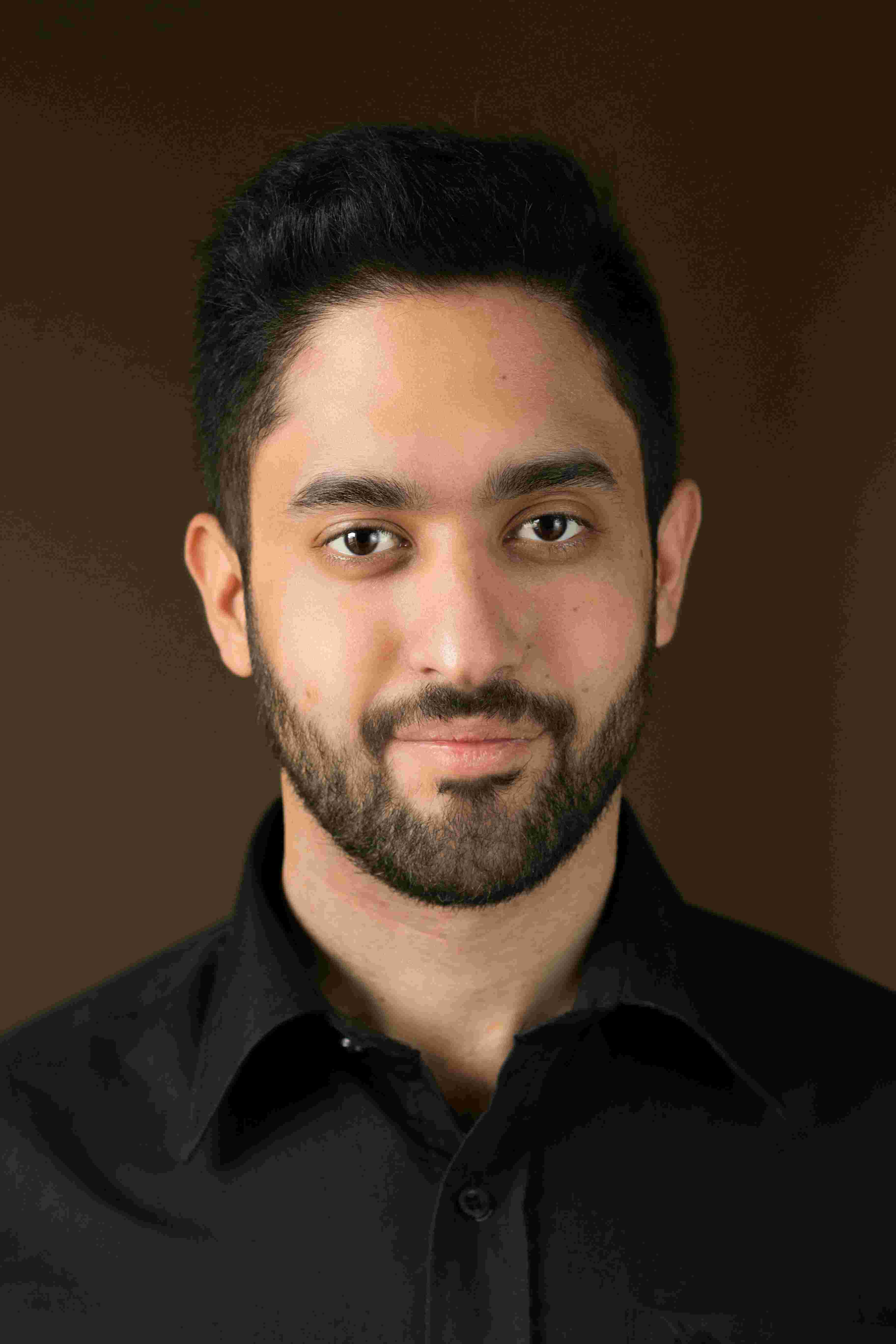
José Mongelós

José Mongelós (born in Asunción on April 10, 1989) is a Paraguayan tenor.

== Biography ==
In 2013 he made his European concert debut in Switzerland singing Das Paradies und die Peri by Robert Schumann with Musiques des Lumières conducted by Facundo Agudin. In 2014 he made his operatic debut in Europe singing Spoletta in Tosca by Giacomo Puccini on a tour in Switzerland, starring Joanna Parisi, Orlando Niz and Ruben Amoretti. The conductor was Facundo Agudin.

In 2015 he sang Gastone in La traviata by Giuseppe Verdi at the Swiss summer festival Stand'Été, in Moutier.

Lately he has undertaken concerts in Paraguay: a Richard Wagner bicentennial gala and an opera gala with the Paraguay National Symphony Orchestra, conducted by Facundo Agudin. He also was a guest singer in a concert alongside soprano Sumi Jo. He also sang in Beethoven's 9th symphony conducted by Juan Carlos Dos Santos.

He was named in 2013 the official singer of the Congress' Symphony Orchestra (Paraguay).
