= Elicena Andrada =

Paraguayan model

- Occupation: Model
- Height: 1.74 m (5 ft 8 1/2 in)
- Beauty pageant titleholder
- Title: Miss Universe Paraguay 2023
- Major competitions: Miss Universe Paraguay 2023 (Winner); Miss Universe 2023 (Unplaced)

Elicena Andrada Orrego is a Paraguayan model and beauty pageant titleholder who was crowned Miss Universe Paraguay 2023 and represented her country at Miss Universe 2023 pageant.

== Background ==
=== Early life ===
Andrada is half Spanish and a professional tattoo artist. Despite living in Spain from childhood, she decided to return to Paraguay to compete for the Miss Universe Paraguay title. Her road to the title began in the 2022 edition of Reinas del Paraguay, where she finished as first runner-up for the Miss World Paraguay title. However, in 2023 Andrada returned to the competition and won the title of Miss Universe Paraguay 2023.

Andrada started her career at the age of 16, as a model in Spain. She joined a modelling school and soon she started working for several brands in Europe. Andrada’s debut in international beauty pageants was in 2017, when she won the title of Miss América Latina of the World. In July 2021, Elicena competed in the Miss Grand Paraguay 2021 pageant, where she was a second runner-up.

=== Education ===
Andrada possesses a Fine Arts degree and an overflowing passion for drawing. Her commitment to learning led her to take courses at Harvard University on the protection and rights of children, demonstrating her dedication to social causes.

== Pageantry ==
=== Miss Universe 2023 ===
Andrada represented Paraguay at the 72nd Miss Universe competition held in El Salvador on 18 November 2023.

Awards and achievements
Preceded by Lia Ashmore	Miss Universe Paraguay; 2023	Succeeded by Naomi Méndez
