= Giannina Rufinelli =

Paraguayan model and beauty pageant titleholder

- Born: Giannina Ruffinelli Rojas; 1987 (age 38–39)
- Height: 1.72 m (5 ft 7 1/2 in)
- Beauty pageant titleholder
- Title: Belleza Paraguaya 2008
- Major competitions: Belleza Paraguaya 2008 (Winner); Miss Universe 2008 (Unplaced)

Giannina Ruffinelli Rojas (born 1987) is a Paraguayan model and beauty pageant titleholder who represented Paraguay in the Miss Universe 2008 pageant held in the Diamond Bay Resort, Nha Trang, Vietnam on July 14, 2008, but she did not get a place.

Awards and achievements
Preceded by María José Maldonado	Miss Universe Paraguay; 2008	Succeeded by Mareike Baumgarten
