= Lia Ashmore =

Paraguayan beauty pageant titleholder

- Born: Lia Aymara Duarte Ashmore; April 5, 1995 (age 31); Asuncion, Paraguay
- Education: Universidad Americana
- Occupation: Model
- Height: 5 ft 10 in (1.78 m)
- Beauty pageant titleholder
- Title: Miss Universe Paraguay 2022
- Hair color: Light Brown
- Eye color: Green
- Major competitions: Miss Grand Paraguay 2017 (Winner); Miss Grand International 2017 (Top 20); Miss Universe Paraguay 2022 (Winner); Miss Universe 2022 (Unplaced)

Lia Aymara "Leah" Duarte Ashmore (born 5 April 1995) is a Paraguayan model and beauty pageant titleholder who was crowned Miss Universe Paraguay 2022. As Miss Universe Paraguay, Ashmore represented Paraguay at Miss Universe 2022.

She was previously crowned as Miss Grand Paraguay 2017 and represented Paraguay at the Miss Grand International 2017 where she finished in the Top 20.

== Pageantry ==
=== Miss Universe Paraguay 2022 ===
On August 26, 2022 Ashmore represented the department of Guairá and 14 other finalists competed for four titles in the Miss Paraguay 2022 at Paseo La Galería in Asunción. At the end of the event, she was crowned as Miss Universe Paraguay 2022 and succeeded Miss Universe 2021 1st Runner-Up Nadia Ferreira.

=== Miss Universe 2022 ===
Ashmore represented Paraguay at Miss Universe 2022.

Awards and achievements
Preceded by Nadia Ferreira	Miss Universe Paraguay; 2022	Succeeded by Elicena Andrada
