= Miss Universo Paraguay 2006 =

- Date: April 14, 2006
- Presenters: Rubén Rodríguez & Sannie López Garelli
- Entertainment: Amadeus, Dancing moving grooving, La Secreta, Asunción Blues
- Venue: Teatro Lírico del BCP
- Broadcaster: Telefuturo
- Entrants: 18
- Winner: Lourdes Arévalos Fernández; Alto Paraguay

The Miss Paraguay 2006 was held on April 14, 2006. That year, only 18 candidates were competing for the national crown. The chosen winner represented Paraguay at the Miss Universe 2006 pageant.

== Results ==
Final results	Contestant
Miss Paraguay 2006	Alto Paraguay - Lourdes Arévalos
1st Runner-up	Amazonas - Leryn Franco
2nd Runner-up	Boquerón - Elvira Beatriz
3rd Runner-up	Distrito Capital - Miriam Rodríguez
4th Runner-up	Alto Paraná - Camilla Carisimo
Top 10	Asunción - Cristina Benítez; Gran Chaco - Belén Franco; Cordillera - Cafi Agüero; San Pedro - Rebeca Quiñónez; Caazapá - Alicia Flores

=== Special awards ===
- Best Face - Cristina Benítez (Asunción)
- Miss Photogenic (voted by press reporters) - Lourdes Arévalos (Alto Paraguay)
- Miss Congeniality (voted by contestants) - Adriana Barrios (Concepción)
- Miss Elegance - Raquel Duarte (Presidente Hayes)

== Delegates ==
Department	Contestant	Age	Height	Hometown
Alto Paraguay	Lourdes Arévalos Fernández	22	1.83 m (6 ft 0 in)	San Lorenzo
Alto Paraná	Liza Camilla Carisimo Cresta	23	1.75 m (5 ft 9 in)	Ciudad del Este
Amazonas	Leryn Dahiana Franco Steneri	24	1.79 m (5 ft 10 1/2 in)	Asunción
Asunción	Cristina Benítez Vargas	18	1.85 m (6 ft 1 in)	Asunción
Boquerón	Elvira María Beatriz Cuellar	21	1.78 m (5 ft 10 in)	Limpio
Caazapá	Alicia Flores Batistei	22	1.73 m (5 ft 8 in)	Ñemby
Canindeyú	Giuliana Sacarello Mona	19	1.73 m (5 ft 8 in)	Salto del Guairá
Central	Adriana Barrios Mena	20	1.73 m (5 ft 8 in)	Capiatá
Cordillera	María Cafi Agüero Esgaib	24	1.81 m (5 ft 11 1/2 in)	Ciudad del Este
Distrito Capital	Miriam Rodríguez Landro	23	1.82 m (5 ft 11 1/2 in)	Asunción
Gran Chaco	Belén Franco Germán	19	1.78 m (5 ft 10 in)	Capiatá
Itapúa	María del Rocío Martínez Hidalgo	20	1.72 m (5 ft 7 1/2 in)	Encarnación
Misiones	Sasha Huber Noriega	22	1.73 m (5 ft 8 in)	San Juan Bautista
Ñeembucú	Aleli Canillas González	22	1.72 m (5 ft 7 1/2 in)	Asunción
Paraguarí	Gissella Vera Meron	18	1.75 m (5 ft 9 in)	Paraguarí
Presidente Hayes	Raquel Andrea Duarte Avalos	23	1.78 m (5 ft 10 in)	Fernando de la Mora
San Pedro	Rebeca Quiñónez Cadíz	23	1.77 m (5 ft 9 1/2 in)	Areguá
Tebicuary	Alexandra Fretes Montealegre	18	1.76 m (5 ft 9 1/2 in)	Paraguarí

== See also ==
- Paraguay at major beauty pageants
