= Reinas de Belleza del Paraguay 2018 =

- Date: August 24, 2018
- Presenters: Chiche Corte; Paola Hermann
- Venue: Resort Yacht y Golf Club Paraguayo, Asunción, Paraguay
- Broadcaster: RPC
- Entrants: 15
- Winner: MU: Belén Alderete; MW: Maquenna Gaiarín; ME: Larissa Dominguez

The Reinas de Belleza del Paraguay 2018 pageant was held at the Resort Yacht y Golf Club Paraguayo on August 24, 2018, to select Paraguayan representatives to major beauty pageants: Miss Universe, Miss World, Miss Earth, among others. It was broadcast live on RPC.
There were two groups of candidates: Miss Universe/Earth candidates; and Miss World candidates.

== Results ==
=== Placements ===
- Miss Universe/Miss Earth group

Placement	Contestant
Miss Universe Paraguay 2018	Cordillera –Sara Valentina Muñoz Gomez
Miss Earth Paraguay 2018	Amambay – Larissa Dominguez
Reina Hispanoamericana Paraguay 2018	Asunción – Ana Livieres
Miss Global City Paraguay 2018	San Pedro – Karina Da Silva
Vicereine Universe Paraguay 2018	Alto Paraná – Violeta Van Humbeck
1st Runner-Up	Caazapá – Naida Espinola
2nd Runner-Up	Canindeyú – Evelyn Andrade

- Miss World group

Placement	Contestant
Miss World Paraguay 2018	Itapúa – Maquenna Gaiarín
Vicereine World Paraguay 2018	Central – Alisson Martinez
1st Runner-Up	Amambay – Lilian Arce
Top 5	Asunción – Fabiana Mareco; Canindeyú – Carmen Pérez

=== Special awards ===
Award	Contestant
Miss Amaszonas	Evelyn Andrade
Miss Elegance	Evelin Baruja
Miss Photogenic	Naida Espinola

== Contestants ==
=== Miss Universe/Miss Earth group ===
There were 8 official contestants.

Department/City	Candidate
Alto Paraná	Violeta Van Humbeck
Amambay	Larissa Soledad Dominguez Morel
Asunción	Ana Iris Ortiz Livieres
Caazapá	Naida Lujan Espinola Davalos
Canindeyú	Evelyn Baez Andrade
Central	Gissel González Figueredo
Cordillera	María Belén Alderete Gayoso
San Pedro	Karina Da Silva

=== Miss World group ===
There were 7 official contestants.

Department/City	Candidate
Amambay	Lilian Daniela Arce Esquivel
Asunción	Fabiana Maria Mareco Alvarez
Caazapá	Maxima Mabel Ferreira Ledezma
Canindeyú	Carmen Luana Perez Gomez
Central	Alisson Rebeca Martinez Almada
Itapúa	Maquenna Gaiarín Díaz
San Pedro	Evelin Amalia Baruja Arce

== Judges ==
The twelve judges for the final telecast include:

- Gloria de Limpias, president of Promociones Gloria
- Sally Jara, Miss Universe Paraguay 2014
- Pablo Damota, General Manager of Yacht y Golf Club Paraguayo
- Luis Vellasai, architect, set designer, actor
- Bettina Barboza, Miss Universe Paraguay 1995
- Egni Eckert, Miss Universe Paraguay 2012
- Marcos Margraf,, director of Margraf Dental Center
- César Fretes, president of One 2 One
- Guillermo Fridman, professional photographer, make-up artist for Maybelline Paraguay
- Marina Mora, Miss Perú 2001
- Luz Marina González de Durán, Miss Universo Paraguay 1988
- Carsten Pfau, president of Agriterra

== See also ==
- Miss Paraguay
- Miss Universe 2018
- Miss World 2018
- Miss International 2018
- Miss Earth 2018
