= Miss Paraguay 2012 =

- Date: May 18, 2012
- Presenters: Mili Britez; Paola Hermann
- Venue: Asuncion Sheraton Hotel
- Broadcaster: Telefuturo
- Entrants: 7
- Placements: 7
- Winner: Egni Eckert; Central

The Miss Universo Paraguay 2012 pageant was held on May 18, 2012. Alba Riquelme, Miss Universo Paraguay 2011, crowned her successor Egny Eckert at the end of the event; she was the Paraguayan candidate for the 2012 Miss Universe pageant. Elected to represent Paraguay at Miss World 2012 was Fiorella Migiore, for Miss International 2012 was Nicole Huber, and for Miss Earth 2012 was Alexandra Fretes. The pageant was broadcast live on Telefuturo.

== Results ==
=== Placements ===
Placement	Contestant
Miss Paraguay 2012	Central – Egny Eckert
Miss Mundo Paraguay 2012	Asunción – Fiorella Migliore
Miss International Paraguay 2012	Distrito Capital – Nicole Huber
Miss Earth Paraguay 2012	Alto Paraguay – Alexandra Fretes
Miss Continente Americano Paraguay 2012	Guairá – Liliana Santa Cruz
Miss Bikini Paraguay 2012	San Pedro – Nadia Servián
Miss Top Model of the World Paraguay 2012	Amambay – Daysi Lezcano

== Delegates ==
There were 7 official contestants.

Represented	Candidates	Age	Height	Hometown
Alto Paraguay	Alexandra Helena Fretes Galeano	24	1.75 m (5 ft 9 in)	Asunción
Amambay	Daysi Lezcano	18	1.75 m (5 ft 9 in)	Asunción
Asunción	Fiorella Migliore Llanes	23	1.80 m (5 ft 11 in)	Asunción
Central	Egni Analia Eckert Almirón	24	1.83 m (6 ft 0 in)	Luque
Distrito Capital	Nicole Elizabeth Huber Vera	21	1.77 m (5 ft 9 1/2 in)	Asunción
Guairá	Liliana Noemí Santa Cruz Vera	25	1.80 m (5 ft 11 in)	Villarrica
San Pedro	Nadia Yasmine Servian	23	1.76 m (5 ft 9 1/2 in)	Asunción

== Judges ==
The following persons judged the final competition.

- Gloria Suarez de Limpias
- Elenita Ortiz de Dellavedova
- Vivian Benítez
- Fiorella Forestieri de Buzarquis
- Pedro Sanabria
- Juan José Martínez
- José Espínola
- Mirtha Alcaraz
- Guillermo Cortes

== See also ==
- Miss Paraguay
