= Universidad Americana (Paraguay) =

Paraguayan university

- (American University)
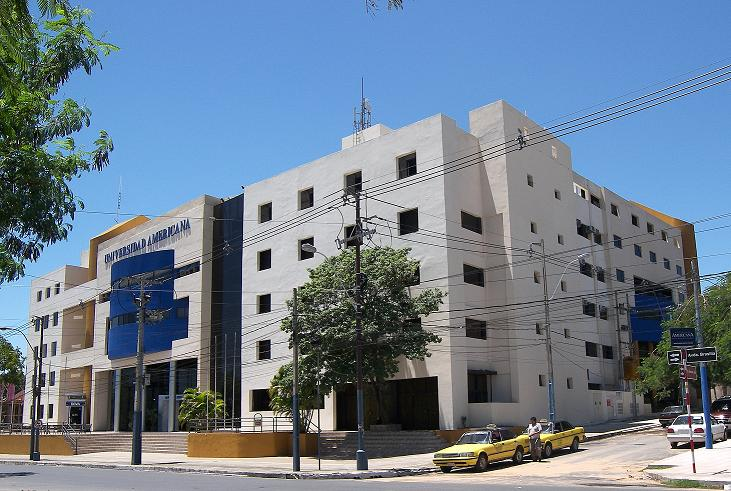
- Universidad Americana (Paraguay)
- Motto: Más que un Titulo
- Motto in English: More than a Title
- Type: Private
- Established: 1994; 32 years ago
- Affiliations: Asociación Paraguaya de Universidades Privadas
- Rector: Sergio Duarte Masi
- Students: c. 9,000 (2013)
- Location: Asunción, Paraguay; 25.2786°S 57.5994°W
- Campus: Urban
- Website: www.americana.edu.py

The Universidad Americana (Spanish for American University) is a private university located in Paraguay.

Founded in 1994, the university has two teaching facilities in Asunción, one in Ciudad del Este and one in Encarnación. It has 4,000 students, and more than 200 professors.

== Colleges ==
The university has four colleges:

- College of Communication, Art and Technology
- College of Economic Sciences and Business
- College of Health Sciences
- College of Law and Social Sciences

== Notable alumni ==
The following are alumni of the university:

- Lia Ashmore
- Nadia Ferreira
- Leryn Franco
- Ansoni Lemans
- Marcelo Medina
- Alba Riquelme
- Roque Santa Cruz
- María Sol Cartes
- Iván Torres
- Iván Zavala
