= Kattya González =

Paraguayan lawyer and politician (born 1977)

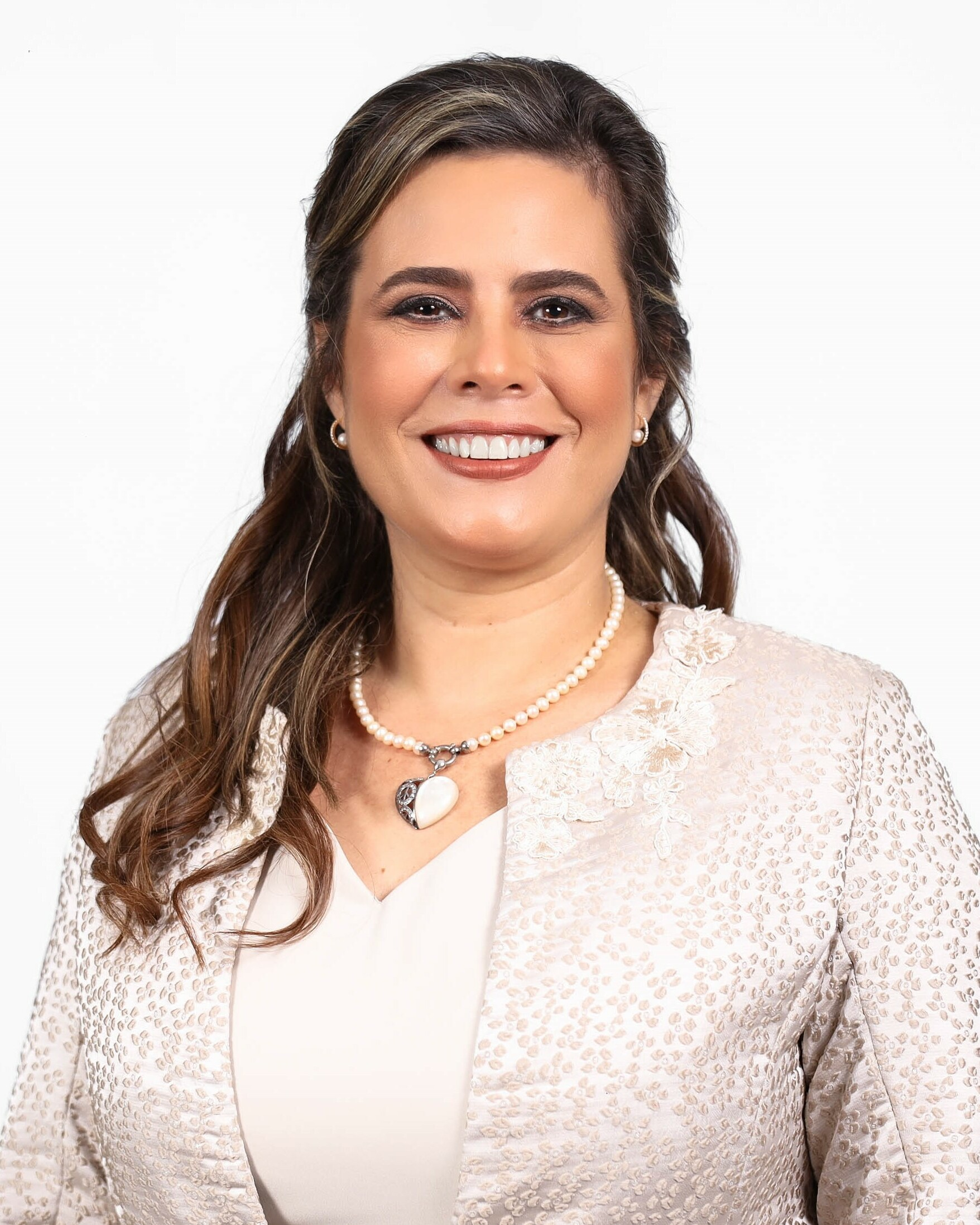
- Official portrait, 2023

Senator of Paraguay
- In office 30 June 2023 – 14 February 2024

Deputy of Paraguay
- In office 30 June 2018 – 30 June 2023
- Constituency: Central

Personal details
- Born: Kattya Mabel González Villanueva; June 24, 1977 (age 49) Asunción, Paraguay
- Party: Independent (since 2024)
- Other political affiliations: National Encounter (2018–2024); Beloved Fatherland (2006–2013)
- Spouse: Luis María Casco (m. 2007)
- Children: 2

Kattya Mabel González Villanueva (born 24 June 1977) is a Paraguayan lawyer, union leader, writer, actress and politician who served as senator from 2023 until her impeachment in 2024. She is considered one of the main leaders of the opposition to the Colorado Party and cartismo.

The daughter of lawyer and politician Marcial González Safstrand, González studied law and worked in her father's firm. She became involved in unions, leading demonstrations against corruption in Paraguay's justice system. In 2006, González was elected to the Villa Elisa City Council, serving there until 2010.

In 2018, González was elected to the Chamber of Deputies, representing the Central Department. She opposed the government of Mario Abdo Benítez, accusing it of corruption and incompetence, specially during the COVID-19 pandemic. González became a national figure during her tenure due to her speeches in the Chamber and her use of social media. She also introduced legislation to reform Paraguay's healthcare, education and public transportation.

In 2023, González was elected to the Senate with over a hundred thousand votes. However, half a year after being sworn in, she lost her seat due to an impeachment pushed by the cartist members of the Colorado and Liberal parties. She has since sought to take back her seat through the courts, while also being a media figure and deciding player in the internal politics of the opposition.

== Early life and education ==
Kattya Mabel González Villanueva was born on 28 June 1977 in Asunción, the daughter of Marcial González Safstrand and Zuly Villanueva. Her father was a lawyer and politician who was persecuted by the dictatorship of Alfredo Stroessner for his activities in the Revolutionary Febrerist Party and later served as senator from 2008 to 2013. González grew up in Villa Elisa, city where her family has lived since her great-grandfather immigrated from Sweden as one of its founders.

González attended the Dominican Republic Basic School and the Dr. Fernando de la Mora National School, both in Fernando de la Mora. González graduated as a lawyer from the Catholic University of Asunción and from the Judicial School of Paraguay, she then studied abroad, in Spain. She got a master's degree from Paraguay's Columbia University in 2022.

In 1999, González had a son with her then partner, prosecutor Cristian Roig; the couple split up during the pregnancy. On 31 March 2007, González married Luis María Casco, who fathered her second child. González and Casco have an open marriage.

== Political career ==
=== Early career ===
Alongside her father, González joined the Beloved Fatherland Party, which emerged in the early 21st century on an anti-corruption and anti-establishment platform. She was elected to the Villa Elisa City Council in the municipal elections of 2006, serving until 2010. González run for a seat in the Chamber of Deputies in the 2013 general election, unsuccessfully. Later that year, she and her father left the party, citing mismanagement and a refusal to renovate.

=== Congressional career ===
==== Chamber of Deputies (2018-2023) ====
After her fallout with the Beloved Fatherland Party, González joined the National Encounter Party, which was a strong player in the 90s but had since become electorally irrelevant. In September 2017, she officially launched her bid for a seat in the Chamber of Deputies in the 2018 general election, in which she ended up being elected.

==== Senate (2023-2024) ====
In 2022, González joined the Concertación, a big tent coalition of almost all parties opposed to the Colorado Party. That year she launched a bid for the presidency in the 2023 general election, which she ended up retiring in favor of a Senate bid. When the election came, González was elected senator with over a hundred thousand votes.

In February 2024, an impeachment process was started against González by the senators of the Colorado and Liberal parties aligned with former president Horacio Cartes. The vote successfully ousted González, who was replaced by Ignacio Iramain, and was criticized by the opposition and media outlets for its unusual swiftness, vague charges and alleged violation of Senate code. González has since tried to revert her ousting through legal appeals.
