= Karina Buttner =

Paraguayan beauty queen

- Born: Karina Rebeca Buttner Naumann; Asunción, Paraguay
- Height: 1.80 m (5 ft 11 in)
- Beauty pageant titleholder
- Title: Miss Mundo Paraguay 2003; Miss Universo Paraguay 2005
- Hair color: Blond
- Eye color: Green
- Major competitions: Miss Mundo Paraguay 2003 (Winner); Miss Universo Paraguay 2005 (Winner); Miss World 2003 (Unplaced); Miss Universe 2005 (Unplaced)

Karina Rebeca Buttner Naumann (born 1983) is a Paraguayan model and beauty pageant titleholder who won Miss Universo Paraguay 2005 and represented Paraguay at Miss Universe 2005 but unplaced. She was previously crowned Miss Mundo Paraguay 2003 and competed at Miss World 2003 in China but unplaced.

Preceded by Yanina González	Miss Paraguay; 2005	Succeeded by Lourdes Arévalos
