= Cesar Grillon =

Paraguayan diplomat (born 1957)

Cesar Esteban Grillon
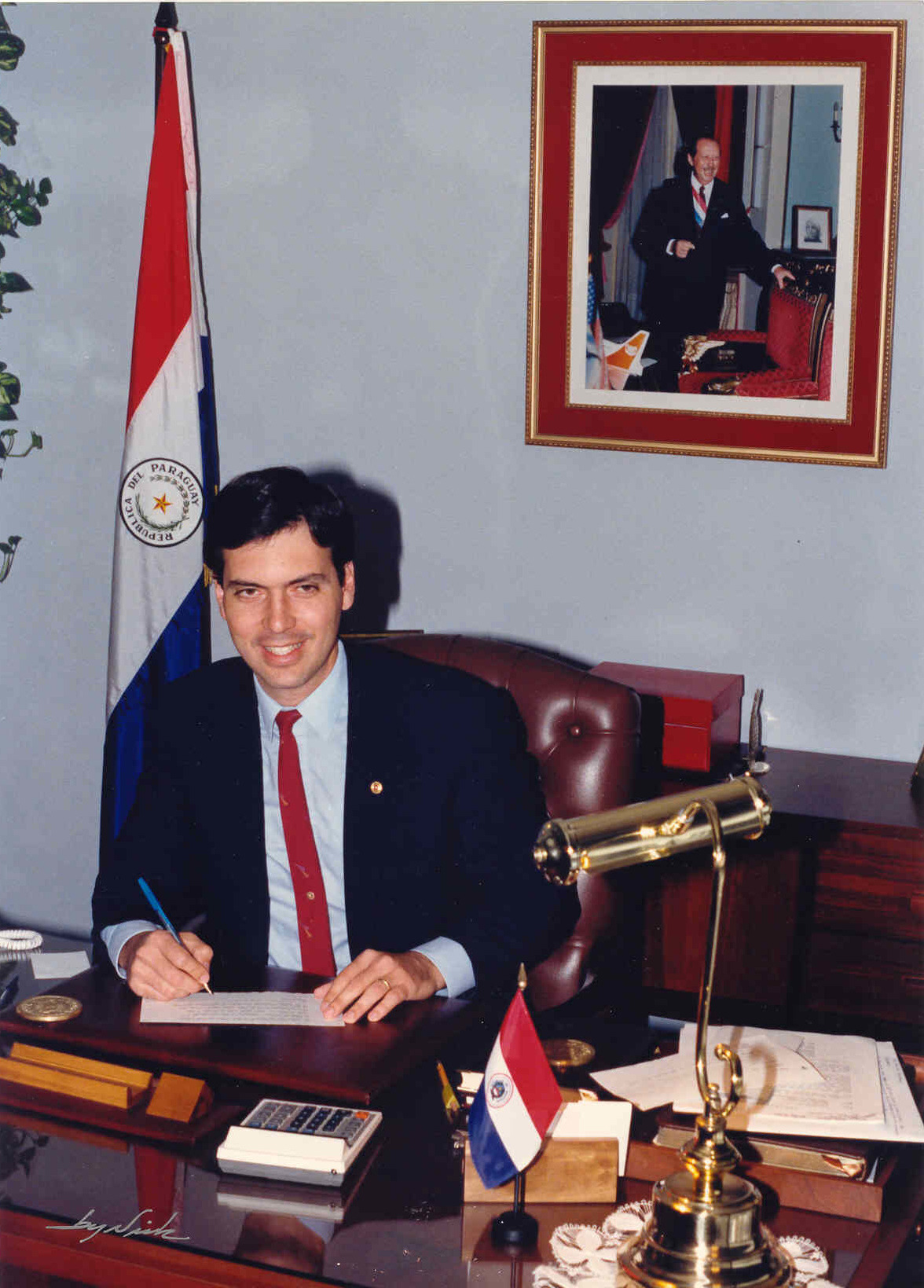
- Cesar Esteban Grillon, in Miami

Consul General of Paraguay in Miami
- In office October 1986 – October 1993

Ambassador of Paraguay to Indonesia
- In office June 2010 – 2015

Personal details
- Born: March 14, 1957

Cesar Esteban Grillon was born in Asunción, Paraguay in 1957. He was the first Consul General of Paraguay in Miami. He served in this position from 1986 - 1993. He promoted his country and greatly increased the diplomatic, commercial, and cultural relationship between the United States and Paraguay.

He was the first Ambassador of Paraguay to Jakarta, Indonesia. The Republic of Paraguay closed their Embassy to Indonesia in 2015 as part of right-sizing efforts.

Grillon was mentioned in a South Florida Business Journal article while he was Consul General. The article states: And the country's 31-year-old Consul General in Miami, Cesar Esteban Grillon, is receiving much credit for softening Paraguayan government policy that leaned for decades towards protectionism. "Cesar does in fact represent the new Paraguay," says Miami attorney Margaret Kent, a member of the law firm Feinchrieber & Associates. "I think he is knocking down the doors that need to be knocked down."
