= Guadalupe González =

Paraguayan model and beauty pageant titleholder

- Born: María Guadalupe González Talavera; February 29, 1992 (age 34); Lambaré, Paraguay
- Other name: Guada
- Height: 1.73 m (5 ft 8 in)
- Beauty pageant titleholder
- Title: Nuestra Belleza Paraguay 2013
- Hair color: Black
- Eye color: Black
- Major competitions: Nuestra Belleza Paraguay 2013 (Winner); Miss Universe 2013; Reina Hispanoamericana 2013 (5th Runner-Up / Chica Amazonas)

María Guadalupe González Talavera (born February 29, 1992) is a Paraguayan model and beauty pageant titleholder who after winning the Nuestra Belleza Paraguay 2013 pageant, represented her country at the 62nd edition of Miss Universe pageant held in Moscow, Russia.

== Early life ==
Guadalupe was a student at Colegio Santa Ines, located in Lambaré.

== Nuestra Belleza Paraguay 2013 ==
The Paraguayan representatives for Miss Universe, Miss World, and other international pageants, were chosen on June 27, 2013, in Asunción. The winner was María Guadalupe González Talavera, she competed in Miss Universe 2013, in Moscow, Russia, on November 9, 2013, but failed to place.

== Pageantry ==
- González represented Paraguay at the Miss Atlántico Internacional 2012 pageant held in Punta del Este, Uruguay, where she won two special awards: Best National Costume and Best Presence.
- She also represented her country at the Miss Latinoamérica 2012 pageant, held in Panama.
- In 2013, she won the title of Nuestra Belleza Paraguay 2013. She then represented Paraguay at Miss Universe 2013 in Russia, on 9 November 2013.
- She represented Paraguay at Reina Hispanoamericana 2013 on December 12, 2013, where she placed 5th Runner-Up.

Preceded by Egni Eckert	Miss Universe Paraguay; 2013	Succeeded by Sally Jara
