= Richard Moray =

Paraguayan professional boxer (born 31011987)

Personal information
- Nicknames: La Panterita; La Pantera
- Born: Richard Emanuel Moray Martinez; January 31, 1987 (age 39) Asuncion, Paraguay
- Height: 5 ft 9 in (175 cm)
- Weight: Super welterweight

Boxing career
- Stance: Orthodox

Boxing record
- Wins: 7
- Win by KO: 5
- Losses: 3

Richard Emanuel Moray Martinez (born January 31, 1987) is a Paraguayan professional boxer.

== Professional boxing career ==
On July 5, 2019, while still in prison for aggravated robbery, Moray defeated Brazilian Carlos Santos de Jesus in the second round via knockout. The Brazil-based National and International Boxing Association, which sanctioned the fight, declared Moray the super welterweight champion of South America. The fight was featured on the first episode of the fourth season of the Netflix television documentary Inside the World's Toughest Prisons that was released on July 29, 2020.

== Personal life ==
On July 11, 2019, Moray was granted parole, a week after defeating Carlos Santos de Jesus. In October 2020, Moray was arrested for alleged assault and theft. His parole was revoked by Judge Cynthia Lovera and he was sent back to prison in Tacumbú.

== Professional boxing record ==
| 10 fights | 7 wins | 3 losses |
|---|---|---|
| By knockout | 5 | 3 |
| By decision | 2 | 0 |

| No. | Result | Record | Opponent | Type | Round | Date | Location | Notes |
|---|---|---|---|---|---|---|---|---|
| 9 | Win | 7–3 | (Brazil) Carlos Santos de Jesus | KO | 2 | July 5, 2019 | (Paraguay) Penitenciaría Nacional de Tacumbú, Asuncion | |
| 9 | Win | 6–3 | (Paraguay) Mario Adalberto Franco Vera | PTS | | April 27, 2016 | (Paraguay) Penitenciaría Nacional de Tacumbú, Asuncion | |
| 8 | Loss | 5–3 | (Uruguay) Mauricio Barragan | TKO | | December 15, 2012 | (Uruguay) Estadio Centenario, Montevideo | |
| 7 | Loss | 5–2 | (Argentina) Jose Maria Caffarena | TKO | | June 30, 2012 | (Argentina) Ce.De.M. N° 1, Caseros | |
| 6 | Loss | 5–1 | (Argentina) Ezequiel Osvaldo Maderna | TKO | | December 3, 2010 | (Argentina) Parque Municipal Eva Perón, Lomas de Zamora | |
| 5 | Win | 5–0 | (Paraguay) Silvio Orlando De Mello | UD | | September 17, 2009 | (Paraguay) Polideportivo Osvaldo Domínguez Dibb, Asuncion | |
| 4 | Win | 4–0 | (Paraguay) Santiago Coronel Sanchez | TKO | | March 27, 2009 | (Paraguay) Estadio Virgen del Carmen, Asuncion | |
| 3 | Win | 3–0 | (Paraguay) Julio Cesar Colman | KO | | November 21, 2008 | (Paraguay) Polideportivo Osvaldo Domínguez Dibb, Asuncion | |
| 2 | Win | 2–0 | (Paraguay) Mariano Franco Figueredo | KO | | July 4, 2008 | (Paraguay) Estadio Virgen del Carmen, Asuncion | |
| 1 | Win | 1–0 | (Paraguay) Mariano Franco Figueredo | KO | | 16 May 2008 | (Paraguay) Ciudad del Este | |
