= Reinas de Belleza del Paraguay 2017 =

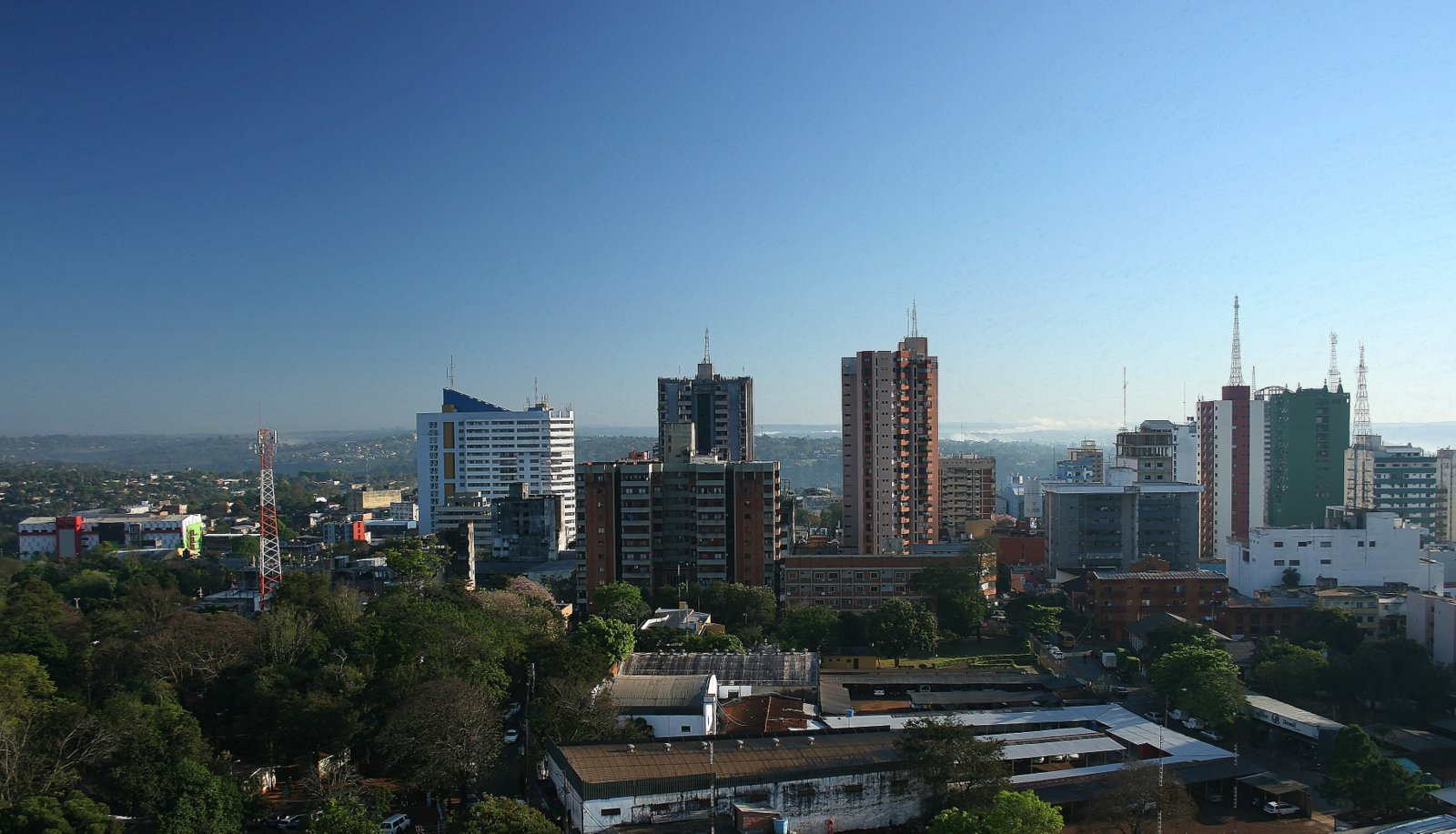
- Ciudad del Este, host city of this edition.
- Date: September 2, 2017
- Presenters: Juan Arce; Paola Martinez
- Venue: Gran Nobile Hotel, Ciudad del Este, Paraguay
- Broadcaster: TV UP
- Entrants: 21
- Winner: MU: Ariela Machado MW: Paola Oberladstatter; MI: Daisy Lezcano ME: Valeria Ivasiuten
- Congeniality: Elena Amarilla
- Photogenic: Giselle Wiegert

The Reinas de Belleza del Paraguay pageant was held at the Gran Nobile Hotel on September 2, 2017, to select Paraguayan representatives to four major beauty pageants: Miss Universe, Miss World, Miss International and Miss Earth. It was broadcast live on Brazilian channel TV UP.

For the first time in its history, the pageant was held in Ciudad del Este, 320 km from the Paraguayan capital. There were two groups of candidates: Miss Universe/International candidates, and Miss World/Earth candidates.

== Results ==
- Miss Universe/Miss International group

Final results	Contestant
Miss Universe Paraguay 2017	Amambay - Ariela Machado
Vicereine Universe Paraguay 2017	Residentes en Brazil - Vannesa Lautenschlager
Miss International Paraguay 2017	Paraguarí - Daisy Lezcano
1st Runner-up	Central - Belén Palmerola
2nd Runner-up	Asunción - Yei Park
3rd Runner-up	Itapúa - Yazmin Franz

- Miss World/Miss Earth group

Final results	Contestant
Miss World Paraguay 2017	Alto Paraná - Paola Oberladstatter
Vicereine World Paraguay 2017	Asunción - María Fernanda Perelló
Miss Earth Paraguay 2017	Itapúa - Valeria Ivasiuten
1st Runner-up	Central - Ellen Morán
2nd Runner-up	San Pedro - Fiorella Crosa
3rd Runner-up	Cordillera - Elena Amarilla

== Special awards ==
Award	Contestant
Miss Top Model	Ariela Machado
Miss Amaszonas	Yazmin Franz
Best Body	Daisy Lezcano
Miss Talent	María Fernanda Perelló

== Contestants ==
=== Miss Universe/Miss International group ===
There are 13 official contestants.

Department/City	Candidate
Alto Paraná	Laura Beatriz Encina
Amambay	Ariela Machado
Asunción	Yei Park
Boquerón	Marlene Irala
Caaguazú	Brenda Flecha
Caazapá	Nataly Ramirez
Canindeyú	Amanda Villalba
Central	Belen Palmerola
Concepción	Griscel Jara Vera
Itapúa	Yasmin Almeida Franz
Paraguarí	Daisy Lezcano
Residentes en Brazil	Vannesa Lautenchslager
San Pedro	Gabriela Benitez

== See also ==
- Miss Paraguay
- Miss Universe 2017
- Miss World 2017
- Miss International 2017
- Miss Earth 2017
