= Joanna Parisi =

Italian-American operatic spinto soprano

Joanna Parisi is an Italian-American operatic spinto soprano. She has sung many Verdi, Puccini, dramatic bel canto and verismo roles on stages in Europe, the Americas and Asia. She has also starred in operatic performances featured internationally in cinema and on television, such as Tosca and Carmen. In 2016, she was named as one of "The Next Generation of Great Opera Singers" by WQXR-FM.

She has performed in many prestigious theaters worldwide, such as Carnegie Hall, Central Park in New York, Teatro Antico di Taormina, Teatro de Bellas Artes, Teatro Amazonas, National Centre for the Performing Arts (China), and Teatro Solís.

She has performed with opera stars including Cristina Gallardo-Domâs, Ramón Vargas, Plácido Domingo, Walter Fraccaro, George Petean and Elena Maximova.

Her operatic repertoire includes Elisabeth of Valois in Don Carlo, Leonora in Il trovatore, Lady Macbeth, Lucrezia Borgia, Abigaille in Nabucco, Manon Lescaut, Aida, Margherita/Elena in Mefistofele, Floria Tosca, Donna Anna in Don Giovanni, and Micaela in Carmen, as well as Senta in Der Fliegende Hollander, Sieglinde in Die Walküre, and Elisabeth in Tannhäuser.

In 2012, she represented USA and Italy in Placido Domingo's Operalia, The World Opera Competition in Beijing, China. Her discography includes Verdi Lieder with Capriccio Records in Vienna, Austria.

In 2015 she was recognized by the WQXR Classical Radio Excellence in Opera Awards. In 2016, her performance in Bizet's Carmen, filmed in Sicily at the Teatro antico di Taormina, was featured at the Berlinale film festival.
