= Miss Universo Paraguay 2020 =

- Date: December 3, 2020
- Presenters: Mario Ferreiro
- Venue: Veranda, Asunción, Paraguay
- Entrants: 10
- Winner: Vanessa Castro

The Miss Universo Paraguay 2020 pageant was held at Veranda at Resort Yacht y Golf Club Paraguayo on December 3, 2020, to select the Paraguayan representative to Miss Universe. It was streamed live on the organizer's social media pages.
Ketlin Lottermann, Miss Universo Paraguay 2019, crowned Vanessa Castro as the new Miss Universo Paraguay 2020, givin her the right to compete at Miss Universe 2020.

== Results ==
Final results	Contestant
Miss Universe Paraguay 2020	Vanessa Castro
Virreina	Gabriela Benítez
1st Runner-up	Araceli Domínguez
2nd Runner-up	Cristina Benítez

== Special awards ==
- Miss Social Media: Yenny Benítez
- Best Face: Sandra Sanabria
- Miss Elegance: Sara Ramos
- Miss Photogenich: Keren Gavilán
- Miss Sympathy: Viviana Vera
- Miss Silhouette: Cindy Aquino

== Contestants ==
There were 10 official contestants.

#	Candidate	Age	City
1	Viviana Vera	24	
2	Sandra Sanabria	27	Asunción
3	Cindy Aquino	21	
4	Keren Gavilán	20	
5	Sara Ramos	25	
6	Gabriela Benítez	25	
7	Vanessa Castro	27	
8	Cristina Benítez	25	
9	Araceli Domínguez	22	
10	Yenny Benítez	20	

== See also ==
- Miss Paraguay
- Miss Universe 2020
