= Municipal Theatre Ignacio A. Pane =

Theatre in Asunción, Paraguay

- Teatro Municipal "Ignacio A. Pane"
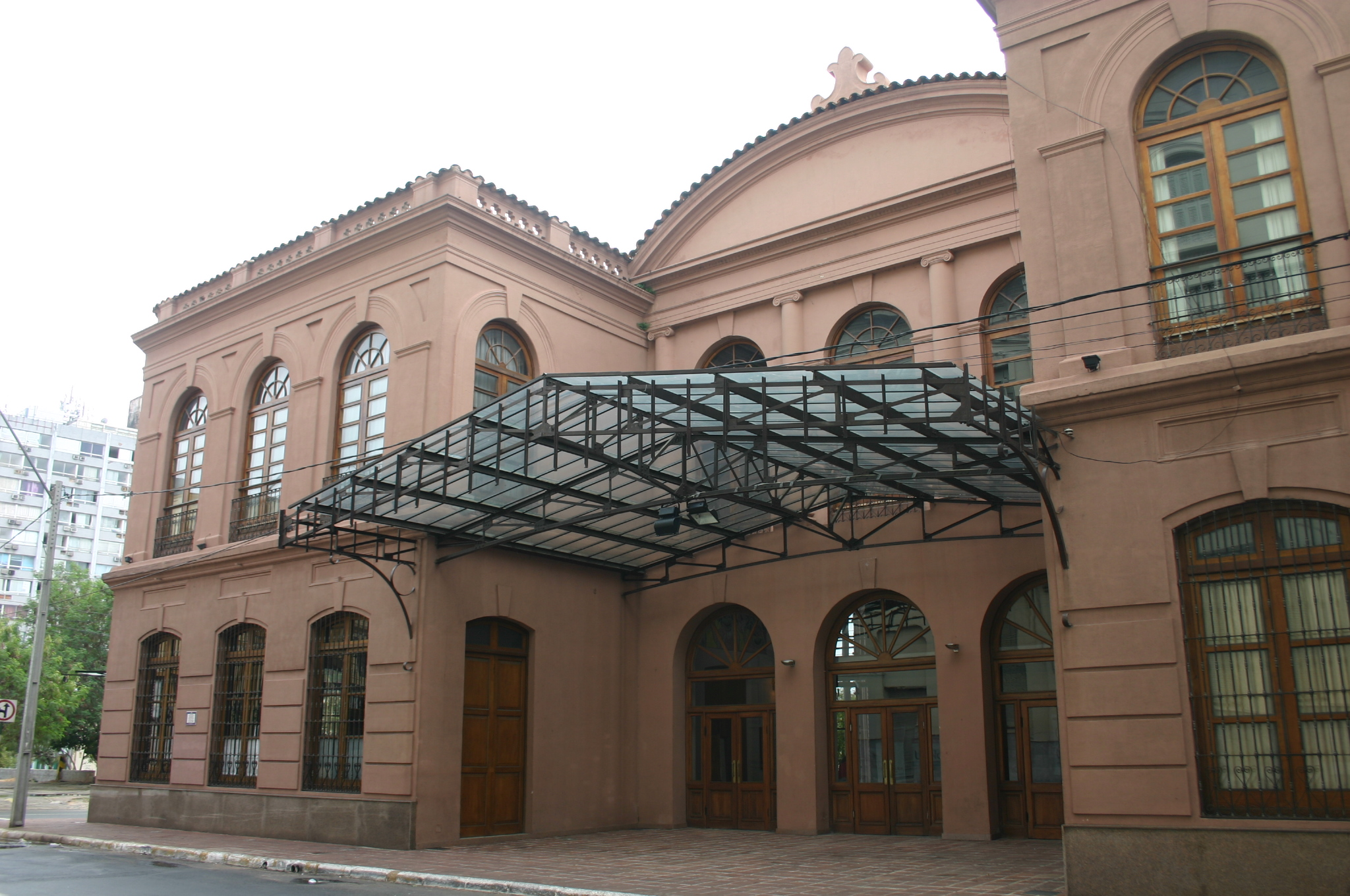
- Southwest facade
- Interactive map of Municipal Theatre Ignacio A. Pane
- Address: President Franco Avenue, between Alberdi and Chile streets Asunción; Paraguay
- Coordinates: 25.2811°S 57.6349°W
- Capacity: 700
- Type: Theatre
- Field size: 4,643 square metres (49,980 sq ft)

Website
- www.teatromunicipal.com.py/elteatro.php

The Municipal Theatre Ignacio A. Pane is a municipal theatre in Asunción, the capital city of Paraguay.

== History ==
The first theatre building was constructed in 1843, during the consulship of Carlos Antonio López and Mariano Roque Alonso. In 1844, the building was inaugurated and served as the meeting place for the First National Congress.

In 1855, López, now president of the republic and convinced of the need for cultural facilities, instructed the Spanish journalist and playwright Ildefonso Antonio Bermejo to open a theatre in the old Congress building. The theatre was inaugurated on November 4, 1855.

In 1886, Catalan businessman, Baudillo Alió, was awarded the land on which the old building stood, and was granted permission to raze it and build a new building. He then began the construction of a new "National Theatre", which was completed in 1889.

The inauguration took place on July 21, 1889, with the introduction of the Company Orchestra, La Estudiantina Española Figaro, which performed works by Verdi, Schubert, Flotow, and others.

In 1894, La Obra de Alió, a renovation of the theatre introduced boxes and courtyards with gardens. The billboard shows continued and the life of this first building of Asunción drew the attention of friends and strangers. For the chamber of the "Primer Coliseo" of Asuncion, became renowned foreign companies and national opera, operetta, zarzuela, and theatre.

The National Theater has been under the municipal administration since the late 19th century. In 1939, theatre ownership was transferred to the Municipality of Asuncion. In 1949, it changed its name to the Municipal Theatre "Ignacio A. Pane."

== Restoration ==
The Theatre was closed in 1995 because of advanced deterioration and even the collapse of certain sections. In June 1997—after preliminary archaeological investigations and finds and with the collaboration with the Spanish Agency for International Development Cooperation and the School–Workshop Asuncion, who participated in a design competition—the restoration of the Municipal Theatre was undertaken by the municipal administration.

In the view of the winners of the design competition of 1995, Corvalan and Capelletti, the architectural value of the Municipal Theatre is relatively modest. Before considering what the restoration would entail, they would rather talk of an intervention to make the building more practical, the idea being to integrate the existing old parts with a contemporary approach, with particular emphasis on the privileged position the building occupies in the heart of the city's historic centre.

The draft proposal identified the need to enhance three functional parts of the Theatre: access—including a large drum octagonal plate and block for scenery that is almost at building height—and the addition of two new elements: a block of services, with lateral connections, and a large roof over the courtyard north. New entrances were built on the street Alberdi, closing it for vehicular use, while creating a small square linked to the Theatre and Mall. This proposal does not close the old access, but proposes greater fluidity in inside-outside relationship.

=== Interior ===
Building access is constrained by having to recover the original plant, eliminate subsequent additions, install a new system of bypasses and services, and increase the capacity of the original access.

The drum is part of the same general picture, with the particular additions of having better sight lines in the boxes and a new slope in the stalls to improve visibility. The main body of the theatre was modified in response to the international standards of stage width, depth, and noise.

The north courtyard, a new component of the project, will be used as a multipurpose hall, integrating fragments of the old building of Congress. It is proposed to maintain its texture without altering the overall volume of the whole.

=== Current configuration ===
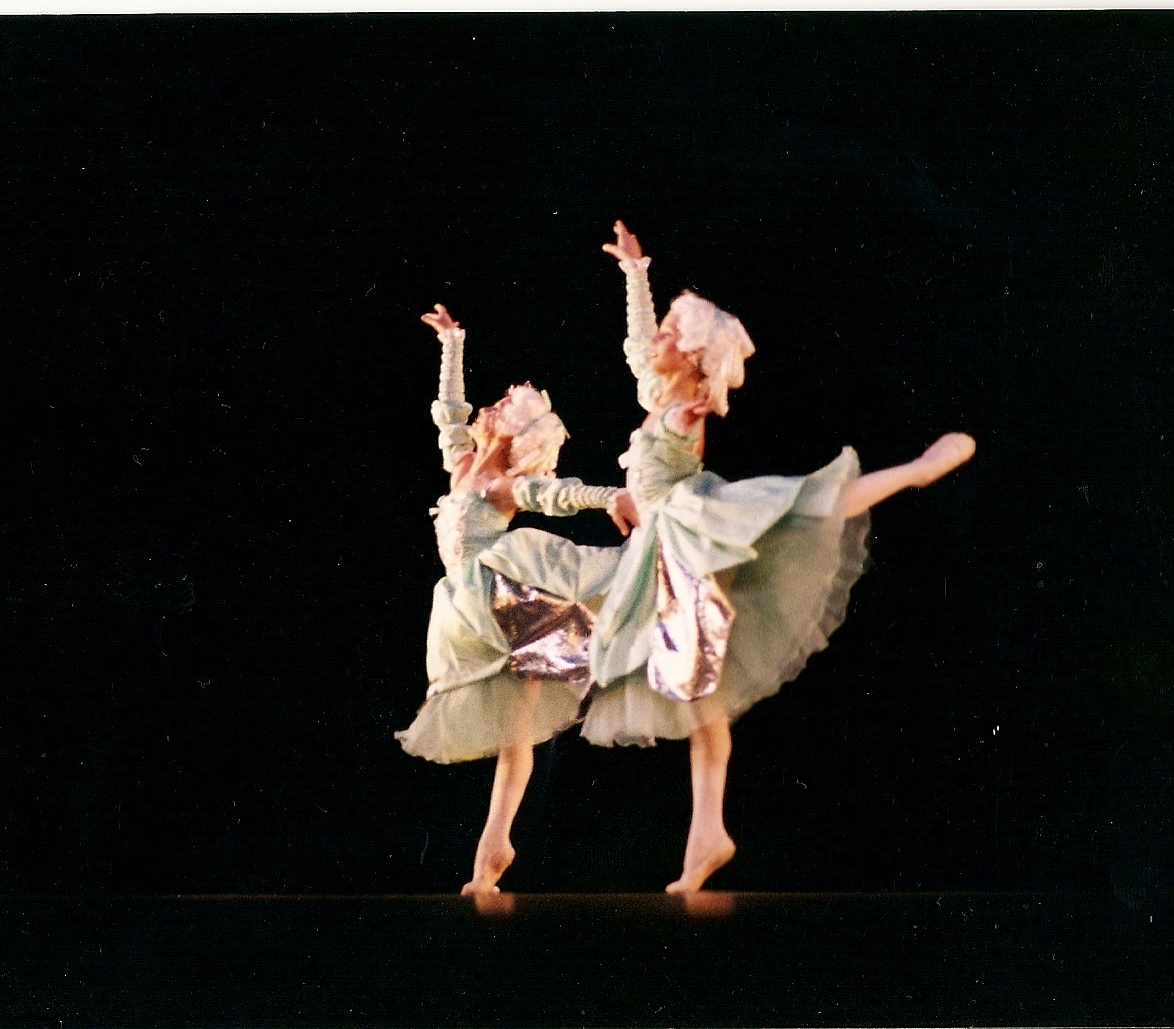
Classical dance

Architects: Carpelletti, Corvalán, Espínola Associates.

Start of work: September 28, 2004.

Completion date: December 2005.

Total area: 4,643 square metres (49,980 sq ft).

Stage: area 225 square metres (2,420 sq ft), width 13.60 metres (44.6 ft), height 8.90 metres (29.2 ft) (scenery tower 22 metres (72 ft))

Orchestra pit: 68 square metres (730 sq ft) with a capacity for 90 musicians.

The theatre's auditorium has a form of a horseshoe, with a total seating capacity of 700, divided into 2 parts:

a) Street-level, main auditorium seating: 490.

b) Box-seats surrounding auditorium: 70 boxes on 3 levels, each box seating 3.

Roof: retains its original form but replaces the old wooden structure with metal.

== New theatres ==
In September 2001, "The Cafe Theatre" was created on the ground floor, together with a small room for drama, named for Baudilio Alió, at the corner of President Franco and Alberdi streets. On April 28, 2003, the Jacinto Herrera room was created for classes and testing on the first floor, with offices on the ground floor, on the corner of President Franco and Chile.

== Bibliography ==
- Historical Encyclopedia of Paraguay, published by the Nation newspaper.
