= Margarita Morselli =

Paraguayan artist (b. 1952)

- Born: Margarita Morselli; January 8, 1952 (age 74); Asunción, Paraguay
- Education: Universidad Nacional de Paraguay (Law); Instituto para el Desarrollo Armónico de la Personalidad (Art)
- Known for: Painting, Video Art
- Notable work: Autorretrato, Escalera VI, Deconstrucción, De la Serie Somos
- Style: Abstraction with references to real spaces
- Movement: Contemporary Art
- Awards: Grand Prize at Bosque de los Artistas (1990); Juror's Prize at Martel Biennal (1990)

Margarita Morselli (born 8 January 1952) is an artist who is considered a pioneer in the use of a video as a form of artistic expression in Paraguay. The work she presented was on abstraction with references to real spaces.

== Biography ==
Margarita Morselli was born in Asunción, Paraguay on 8 January 1952. She is an artist whose paintings were described as architecture where she used mineral tones such as shades of ocher, orange and blue. Her technique usually involves paint brushing and airbrushing. One of the recurring theme is the centralization of stairs. She often heeds or disrupts the form of the stairs by creating the illusion of perforating the two-dimensionally of the canvas. This type of technique creates an uncertain and seemingly useless space. Her more recent work addresses environmental concerns including vegetables forms and animals that, as figurative elements, create a certain tension in relation to her abstractions. She also designed costumes for theater and dance pieces. She was later invited to represent her country by participating in the 18th São Paulo Biennial (1985) which was her first one-woman exhibition in the U.S. She was also invited at the 1st Art Biennial at Canning House, London (1987) and at the 3rd Biennial of Cuenca, Ecuador(1992). She is a permanent member of the Centro Cultural de la República and president of the International Art Biennal, both in Asunción. Morselli teaches at the "Instituto para el Desarrollo Armónico de la Personalidad" (IDAP). She is a founding member of Gente de Arte which is an association of Paraguayan artists and cultural.

== Education ==
Morselli has a degree in music education, specifically for piano. She also has a degree from the" Universidad Nacional de Paraguay School of Law". In the Instituto para el Desarrollo Armónico de la Personalidad (IDAP), Morselli attended art classes with Olga Blinder (1939–2008). With the Brazilian professor Livío Abramo, she studied art history in Escolinha de Arte and she was able to enter upon an active professional career, winning rapid recognition as a leading figure in the new generation of Paraguayan artists. At the Instituo Superior de Bella Artes in Asunción, she studied aesthetics with Dorothée Bauerle-Willert and with Michael Krueger she learned about printmaking and printing.

== Collections ==
Her work is in the collections of the Art Museum of the Americas and National Museum of Women in the Arts, both in Washington, DC; Museo de Arte Contemporáneo, Concepción, Paraguay; and Museo del Barro, Asunción.

- Embajada Paraguaya en E.E.U.U.
- Embajada Paraguaya en Francia.
- Embajada Paraguaya en Brasil.
- En colecciones privadas de diferentes países.

== Honors and awards ==
In 1990 she was awarded grand prize at the twentieth anniversary of the Bosque de los Artistas, an art space created by the sculptor Hermann Guggiari (1924-2012). She also received the juror's prize at the Martel Biennal in Asunción.

- Premio "Homenaje a los Defensores del Chaco" (1985)

== Publications ==
- "Las aptitudes deben aprovecharse" Diario Hoy (1980)
- "Arte y Comunicación" Revista Nº 4 Club Centenario (1991)
- "Re Creación" Diario Ultima Hora (1983)
- "Todo está dicho en la Expo" Diario Ultima Hora. (1992)
- El Inalcanzable : Agustín Barrios Mangoré

== Bibliography ==
- Díaz de Espada de Ramírez Boettener, Sara. Mujeres paraguayas contemporáneas. Asunción, Paraguay: Talleres Gráficos Makrographic, 1989.
- Escobar, Ticio. Los argumentos: Exposicion de artes visibles. Asunción, Paraguay Centro Cultural de España, 2002.
- Una interpretación de las Artes Visuales en el Paraguay. Asunción, Paraguay Centro Cultural Paraguayo Americano, 1984.
- Forjadores del Paraguay, Diccionario Biográfico. Buenos Aires: Distribuidora Quevedo de Ediciones, 2000.
- Margarita Morselli of Paraguay: Paintings. Washington, DC: Museum of Modern Art of Latin America,1987.
