= Nuestra Belleza Paraguay 2014 =

- Date: September 13, 2014
- Presenters: Kike Casanova; Tania Domaniczky; Carmiña Masi
- Venue: Yacht & Golf Club Paraguayo, Asunción, Paraguay
- Broadcaster: LaTele
- Entrants: 15
- Placements: 8
- Winner: MU: Sally Jara; MW: Myriam Arévalos; MI: Jéssica Servín; ME: Sendy Cáceres

The Nuestra Belleza Paraguay 2014 pageant was held at the Yacht & Golf Club Paraguayo on September 13, 2014, to select Paraguayan representatives to the four major beauty pageants. Guadalupe González, Miss Universe Paraguay 2013, Coral Ruiz, Miss World Paraguay 2013, Marta Raviolo, Miss International Paraguay 2013, and Leticia Cáceres, Miss Earth Paraguay 2013, crowned their successors: Sally Jara, Myriam Arévalos, Jéssica Servín and Sendy Cáceres, respectively. It was broadcast live on LaTele.

== Results ==
=== Placements ===
Placement	Contestant
Miss Universe Paraguay 2014	Sally Jara
Miss World Paraguay 2014	Myriam Arévalos
Miss International Paraguay 2014	Jéssica Servín
Miss Earth Paraguay 2014	Sendy Cáceres
1st Runner-Up	Laura Garcete
2nd Runner-Up	Silfide Villalba
3rd Runner-Up	Giovanna Cordeiro
4th Runner-Up	Karina Viveros

== Delegates ==
There are 15 official contestants.

#	Candidates	Age	Height	Hometown
1	Sendy Cáceres	25	1.77 m (5.8 ft)	Asunción
2	Noelia Ojeda	25	1.77 m (5.8 ft)	Curuguaty
3	Giovanna Cordeiro	25	1.79 m (5.9 ft)	Asunción
4	Jolanda Krause	23	1.72 m (5.6 ft)	Filadelfia
5	Lucía Méndez	18	1.73 m (5.7 ft)	Itá
6	Jéssica Servín	23	1.72 m (5.6 ft)	Asunción
7	Karina Viveros	20	1.70 m (5.6 ft)	Ciudad del Este
8	Rocío Cantero	22	1.68 m (5.5 ft)	Ñemby
9	Laura Cristaldo	18	1.72 m (5.6 ft)	Pilar
10	Analíz Blanco	20	1.73 m (5.7 ft)	Lambaré
11	Sally Jara	20	1.70 m (5.6 ft)	San Lorenzo
12	Laura Garcete	25	1.72 m (5.6 ft)	Asunción
13	Silfide Villalba	23	1.75 m (5.7 ft)	Villarrica
14	Natalia Montenegro	20	1.77 m (5.8 ft)	Encarnación
15	Myriam Arévalos	21	1.80 m (5.9 ft)	San Pedro

== Contestants notes ==
- Laura Garcete previously joined Nuestra Belleza Paraguay 2013 where she ended up in 5th place, she later represented her country at Miss United Continents 2013 held Ecuador.
- Sendy Cáceres have previously represented Paraguay at Miss Grand International 2013 held Thailand.
- Myriam Arévalos, representing her country, won the Miss Tourism Universal 2012 pageant held in Ecuador.
- Some of the candidates were chosen on regional pageants: Karina Viveros, Silfide Villalba, Rocío Cantero and Sendy Cáceres.

== See also ==
- Miss Paraguay
- Miss Universe 2014
- Miss World 2014
- Miss International 2014
- Miss Earth 2014
