= Miss Universo Paraguay 2010 =

- Date: July 9, 2009
- Presenters: Rubén Rodriguez Tania Domanickzy
- Venue: Telefuturo's Main Studio
- Broadcaster: Telefuturo
- Entrants: 18
- Placements: 10
- Winner: Yohana Benítez
- Photogenic: Stephanie Alfonso

The Miss Paraguay 2010 pageant was held on July 9, 2010. The pageant was broadcast live on Telefuturo. Yohana Benitez was crowned Miss Universo Paraguay and represented the country at the Miss Universe 2010. Egni Eckert was chosen as Miss Mundo Paraguay and went to the Miss World 2010 pageant while María José Paredes represented Paraguay at the Miss International 2010 pageant after being chosen as Miss Internacional Paraguay.

== Results ==
=== Placements ===
Placement	Contestant
Miss Paraguay 2010	Yohana Benítez
Miss Paraguay Mundo 2010	Egni Eckert
Miss Paraguay Internacional 2010	María José Paredes
1st Runner-Up	Larissa Villalba
2nd Runner-Up	Magdalena Estigarribia
Top 10	Andréa Arévalos; Jisela Amaro; Marisol Bernal; Rosa María Ayala; Karina Tillera

== Contestants ==
There were 18 official contestants

Contestant	Age	Height	Hometown
Rosa María Ayala Samper	18	1.81 m (5 ft 11 1/2 in)	Fuerte Olimpo
Sara Lorena Cáceres Marecos	22	1.73 m (5 ft 8 in)	Ciudad del Este
Aida González Viale	22	1.73 m (5 ft 8 in)	Asunción
Andréa Arévalos Arriola	18	1.72 m (5 ft 7 1/2 in)	Ciudad del Este
Alicia Karina Tillera Arias	19	1.81 m (5 ft 11 1/2 in)	San Lorenzo
María José Paredes González	19	1.75 m (5 ft 9 in)	Asunción
Larissa Villalba Valdez	20	1.75 m (5 ft 9 in)	Salto del Guairá
Yohana Benítez Olmedo	23	1.75 m (5 ft 9 in)	Areguá
Mirna Suárez Riera	23	1.73 m (5 ft 8 in)	Asunción
Egni Analia Eckert Almirón	22	1.83 m (6 ft 0 in)	Luque
María Soledad Bernal Somonelli	20	1.76 m (5 ft 9 1/2 in)	Asunción
Stephanie Alfonso Schinini	21	1.80 m (5 ft 11 in)	Villarrica
Diana Benítez Ojeda	24	1.76 m (5 ft 9 1/2 in)	Asunción
Gabriela Arias Amarilla	24	1.80 m (5 ft 11 in)	Ciudad del Este
Evelyn Gómez Villegas	21	1.79 m (5 ft 10 1/2 in)	Asunción
Magdalena Estigarribia Ferreira	18	1.80 m (5 ft 11 in)	Ciudad del Este
Karen Bottrell Lomaquis	19	1.75 m (5 ft 9 in)	Ñemby
Jisela María Amaro Vera	20	1.74 m (5 ft 8 1/2 in)	Asunción

== See also ==
- Miss Paraguay
