= Gabriela Rejala =

Paraguayan model and beauty pageant titleholder (born 1989)

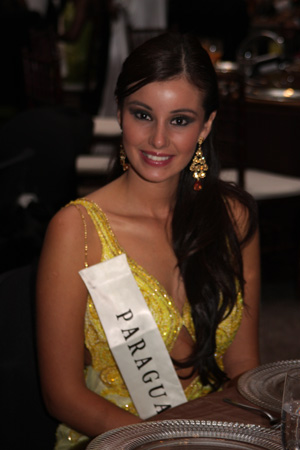
- Born: Gabriela Rejala; 1989 (age 36–37); Ñemby, Paraguay
- Beauty pageant titleholder
- Title: Miss World Paraguay 2008; Miss Earth Paraguay 2009

Gabriela Rejala is a Paraguayan model and beauty pageant titleholder who represented Paraguay at Miss World 2008 in South Africa. She also represented Paraguay in Reina Hispanoamericana 2008 in Santa Cruz, Bolivia on October 30, 2008 and placed as second runner-up. She was Top 16 semifinalist on Miss Earth 2009.

Preceded by María de la Paz Vargas	Miss World Paraguay; 2008	Succeeded by Tamara Sosa
