= Tsiweyenki =

Paraguayan indigenous leader

Tsiweyenki, also known as Gloria Elizeche, (born c. 1951) is the leader of the indigenous Maká people in Paraguay, and the widow of their former leader, Andrés Chemei.

== See also ==
- Culture of Paraguay
