= Alba Riquelme =

Paraguayan model and beauty pageant titleholder

- Born: Alba Lucía Riquelme Valenzuela; 5 February 1991 (age 35); Asunción, Paraguay
- Height: 1.79 m (5 ft 10 1/2 in)
- Beauty pageant titleholder
- Title: Miss Universo Paraguay 2011
- Hair color: Brown
- Eye color: Green
- Major competitions: Miss Beauty of the World 2010 (Top 10); Reina Hispanoamericana 2011 (3rd Runner-up); Miss Universe 2011 (Unplaced)

Alba Lucía Riquelme Valenzuela (born 5 February 1991) is a Paraguayan model and beauty pageant titleholder who was crowned Miss Universo Paraguay 2011 and represented her country in the 2011 Miss Universe pageant. She is not related to fellow Paraguayan model, Larissa Riquelme.

== Early life ==
Alba was born on 5 February 1991, in the capital city of Paraguay. Her parents are César Riquelme and Mabel Valenzuela. She has four siblings. In 2009 she finished high school at Trinity School in Luque, Greater Asunción, and then she continued her studies at Universidad Americana with a major in public relations.

== Model and beauty queen ==
Her modelling career began at age 14 when she won the Elite Model Look Paraguay 2005 contest, and went to China to represent Paraguay. She was chosen as a finalist for the Miss Hawaiian Tropic 2009 in Punta del Este, Uruguay. Also in 2009, she participated in the Yanbal Fashion Week, in Ecuador, it was the second time that the CN Models International Search 2009 were held and it was won by Alba. In May 2010, she represented Paraguay at the Miss Beauty of the World 2010 held in the People's Republic of China, she was among the Top 10 finalists.

In 2011, she participated in the Miss Paraguay 2011 contest, which was held in Asuncion, on 23 June 2011. At the end of the night Riquelme was crowned as the new Miss Universo Paraguay giving her the right to represent Paraguay at the Miss Universe held in São Paulo, Brazil. However, she was unplaced.

She also participated in the Reina Hispanoamericana 2011, where she placed as 3rd runner-up, and won the Best Hair award.

Awards and achievements
Preceded by Yohana Benítez	Miss Paraguay; 2011	Succeeded by Egni Eckert
