= Yohana Benítez =

Paraguayan beauty queen

- Born: Yohana María Belén Benítez Olmedo; February 26, 1987 (age 39)
- Beauty pageant titleholder
- Title: Miss Universo Paraguay 2010
- Hair color: Black
- Eye color: brown
- Major competition: Miss Universo Paraguay 2010

Yohana Benítez (born February 26, 1987) is a Paraguayan model and beauty pageant titleholder who was crowned Miss Universo Paraguay 2010 and represented her country at Miss Universe 2010 in Las Vegas, United States on August 23, 2010.

== About ==
Benítez studied Law at Universidad Nacional de Asunción in Paraguay's capital city, and was the winner of Miss Universo Paraguay 2010. She is also a fashion model in her country having walked the runway during Asunción Fashion Week and Asunción Alta Moda.

Preceded by Mareike Baumgarten	Miss Paraguay; 2010	Succeeded by Alba Riquelme
