= María José Maldonado =

Paraguayan singer (born 1985)

María José Maldonado Gómez
- Born: María José Maldonado Gómez; 26 October 1985 (age 40)
- Height: 5.9 1.75m
- Beauty pageant titleholder
- Hair color: Dark Brown
- Eye color: light Brown.
- Major competitions: Miss Paraguay 2007 (Winner); Miss Universe 2007 (Unplaced); Reina Hispanoamericana 2007 (1st Runner-up)

María José Maldonado Gómez (born October 26, 1985) is a Paraguayan singer, model and beauty pageant titleholder who represented Paraguay at Miss Universe 2007 pageant.

== About ==
She is a professional Attorney at Law, graduated from the National University of Asuncion (UNA) class 2009, distinguished student on the honor roll.

Maldonado was appointment Ambassador and Messenger of Peace International from Paraguay to the United Nations, in South Korea on 27 June 2010, by Mr Chungwon Choue, President of the GCS International (Goodwill, Cooperation and Service) and also President of the World Taekwondo Federation.

== Beauty pageants ==
On 17 March 2007, she was crowned Miss Universo Paraguay 2007, and represented her country in the Miss Universe 2007. The competition was held on 28 May 2007, in Mexico City, Mexico. She also represented her country in Reina Hispanoamericana 2007 held in Santa Cruz, Bolivia, and she was first runner-up "Princesa Hispanoamericana", first runner-up in Miss Aerosur, Best Costume and Miss Photogenic.

== Singing competition ==
After her participation in the 2007 Miss Universe pageant she competed in Cantando por un sueño, a singing competition in Paraguay, based on the British program It Takes Two, in November 2007 during the final show, Maria and her partner, Sebastián Castillo, were placed second in the competition.

== External links and References ==
- Article on Maria as Miss Paraguay 2007
- Photo Gallery of Miss Paraguay 2007

Awards and achievements
Preceded by Lourdes Arévalos	Miss Paraguay; 2007	Succeeded by Gianinna Rufinelli
