= Lourdes Arévalos =

Paraguayan model and beauty pageant titleholder

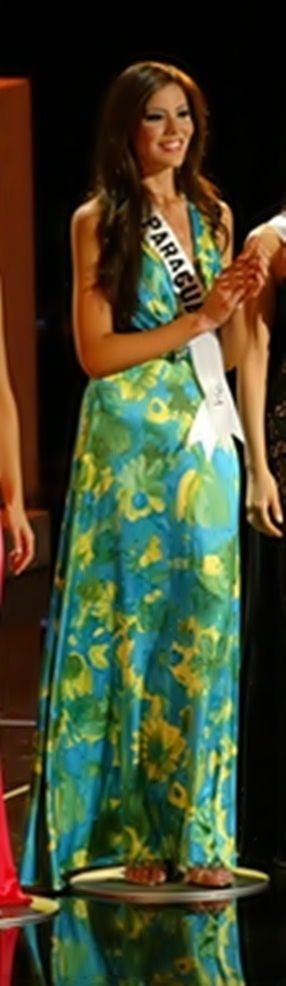
- Born: Lourdes Verónica Arévalos Elias; January 13, 1984 (age 42); San Lorenzo, Paraguay
- Height: 1.82 m (5 ft 11 1/2 in)
- Beauty pageant titleholder
- Title: Miss Universo Paraguay 2006
- Major competitions: Miss Universo Paraguay 2006 (Winner); Miss Universe 2006 (3rd runner-up); Reina Sudamericana 2006 (2nd runner-up)

Lourdes Verónica Arévalos Elias (born January 13, 1984, in San Lorenzo) is a Paraguayan model and beauty pageant titleholder who represented her country in Miss Universe 2006 held in Los Angeles, California, United States on July 23, 2006. She was third runner-up. In the same, year she represented Paraguay in the Reina Sudamericana 2006 beauty pageant and was second runner-up.

== Pageantry ==
=== Miss Universo Paraguay 2006 ===
In 2006, Arévalos won the national competition Miss Universo Paraguay 2006. she earned the right to represent Paraguay at the Miss Universe 2006 pageant.

=== Miss Universe 2006 ===
Arévalos traveled to Los Angeles, California, for the 55th edition of Miss Universe, held on July 23, 2006, at the Shrine Auditorium. She was named third runner‑up, behind first runner‑up Kurara Chibana of Japan, second runner‑up Lauriane Gilliéron of Switzerland, and winner Zuleyka Rivera of Puerto Rico. Her placement marked the highest finish for Paraguay in Miss Universe up to that time.

Awards and achievements
Preceded by (Mexico) Laura Elizondo	Miss Universe 3rd Runner-Up; 2006	Succeeded by (South Korea) Lee Ha-nui
Preceded by Karina Buttner	Miss Universe Paraguay; 2006	Succeeded by María José Maldonado
