= Egni Eckert =

Paraguayan model and beauty pageant titleholder

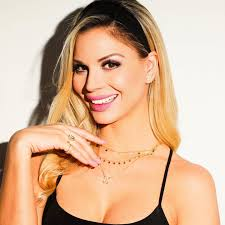
- Born: Egni Analia Almirón Eckert; October 6, 1987 (age 39); Asunción, Paraguay
- Other name: Egny
- Height: 1.83 m (6 ft 0 in)
- Beauty pageant titleholder
- Title: Miss World Paraguay 2010; Miss Universe Paraguay 2012
- Hair color: Blonde
- Eye color: Brown
- Major competitions: Miss Paraguay 2010 (Miss World Paraguay); Reina Hispanoamericana 2010 (Vicereine); Miss World 2010 (Top 25); Miss Universe Paraguay 2012 (Winner); Miss Universe 2012 (Unplaced)

Egni Analia Almirón Eckert, simply known as Egni Eckert or Egny Eckert, is a Paraguayan model and beauty pageant titleholder who represented her country in the Miss World 2010 pageant held in Sanya, China, placing among the Top 25 finalists. Egni represented Paraguay in the Reina Hispanoamericana 2010 pageant where she won the Best Body award and Virreina Title (1st runner up). In 2012 she entered the Miss Universe Paraguay pageant for the second time, and won the Miss Universo Paraguay 2012 crown. She represented Paraguay at the 2012 Miss Universe pageant.

Awards and achievements
Preceded by Tamara Sosa	Miss World Paraguay; 2010	Succeeded by Nicole Huber

Awards and achievements
Preceded by Sandra Vinces (Ecuador)	Virreina Hispanoamericana; 2010	Succeeded by María Jesús Matthei

Awards and achievements
Preceded by Alba Riquelme	Miss Universe Paraguay; 2012	Succeeded by Guadalupe González
