= Yanina González =

Paraguayan actress and model

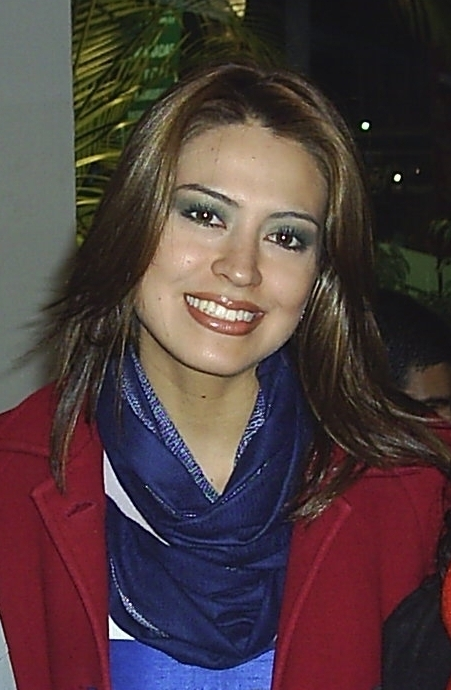
- Yanina González
- Born: Yanina Alicia González Jorgge; 6 December 1979 (age 46); Asunción, Paraguay
- Height: 1.75 m (5 ft 9 in)
- Beauty pageant titleholder
- Title: Miss Universe Paraguay 2004; Miss Earth Fire 2004
- Hair color: Brown
- Eye color: Light Brown
- Major competitions: Miss Universe Paraguay 2004; (Winner); Miss Universe 2004; (3rd Runner-Up); Miss Earth 2004; (Miss Earth – Fire)

Yanina Alicia González Jorgge (born 6 December 1979) is a Paraguayan actress, model and beauty pageant titleholder who was crowned Miss Universo Paraguay 2004 and represented her country at Miss Universe 2004 where she placed 3rd Runner-up. She studied Marketing and Advertising and has a diploma in executive and sport coaching. She also competed at Miss Earth 2004 pageant where she placed 3rd runner-up and was crowned Miss Fire.

Awards and achievements
Preceded by (Poland) Marta Matyjasik	Miss Earth - Fire; 2004	Succeeded by (Serbia and Montenegro) Jovana Marjanović
Preceded by Adriana Baum	Miss Earth Paraguay; 2004	Succeeded by Tania Domaniczky
Preceded by (Serbia and Montenegro) Sanja Papić	Miss Universe 3rd Runner-Up; 2004	Succeeded by (Mexico) Laura Elizondo
Preceded by Rosmary Benítez	Miss Paraguay; 2004	Succeeded by Karina Buttner
