= Outline of Paraguay =

Landlocked country in South America

The Flag of Paraguay

The Coat of arms of Paraguay

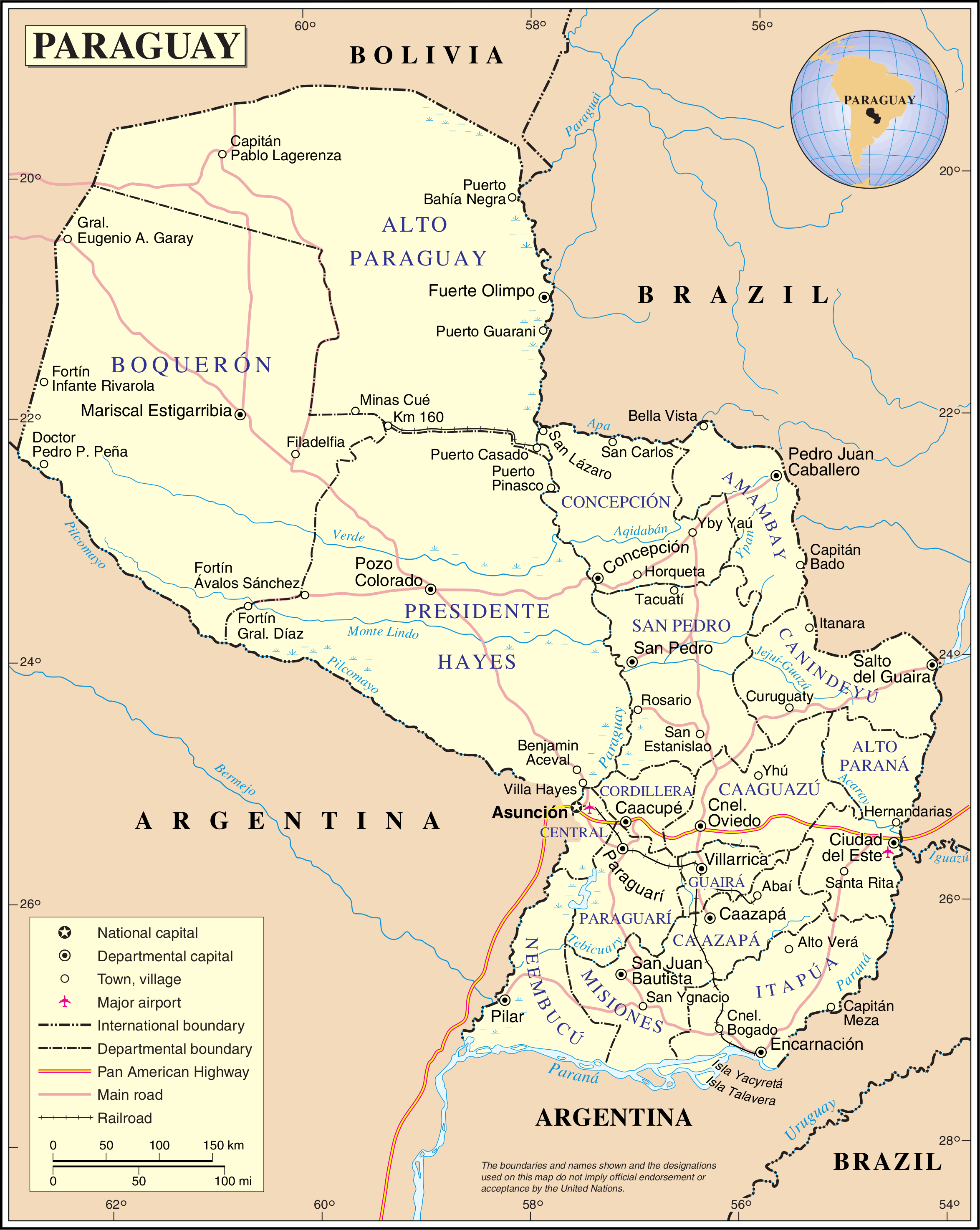
An enlargeable map of the Republic of Paraguay

The following outline is provided as an overview of and topical guide to Paraguay:

Paraguay' – one of the two landlocked countries in South America. (The other is Bolivia.) Paraguay lies on both banks of the Paraguay River, bordering Argentina to the south and southwest, Brazil to the east and northeast, and Bolivia to the northwest, and is located in the center of South America, the country is sometimes referred to as Corazón de América - Heart of (South) America along with Bolivia and Brazil.

== General reference ==
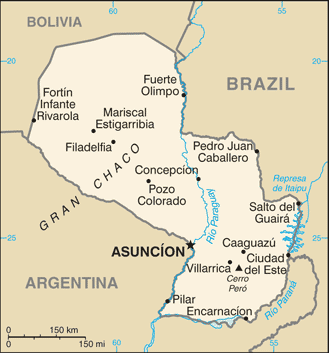
An enlargeable basic map of Paraguay

- Pronunciation:
- Common English country name: Paraguay
- Official English country name: The Republic of Paraguay
- Common endonym(s):
- Official endonym(s):
- Adjectival(s): Paraguayan
- Demonym(s): Paraguayan(s)
- Etymology: Name of Paraguay
- International rankings of Paraguay
- ISO country codes: PY, PRY, 600
- ISO region codes: See ISO 3166-2:PY
- Internet country code top-level domain: .py

== Geography of Paraguay ==
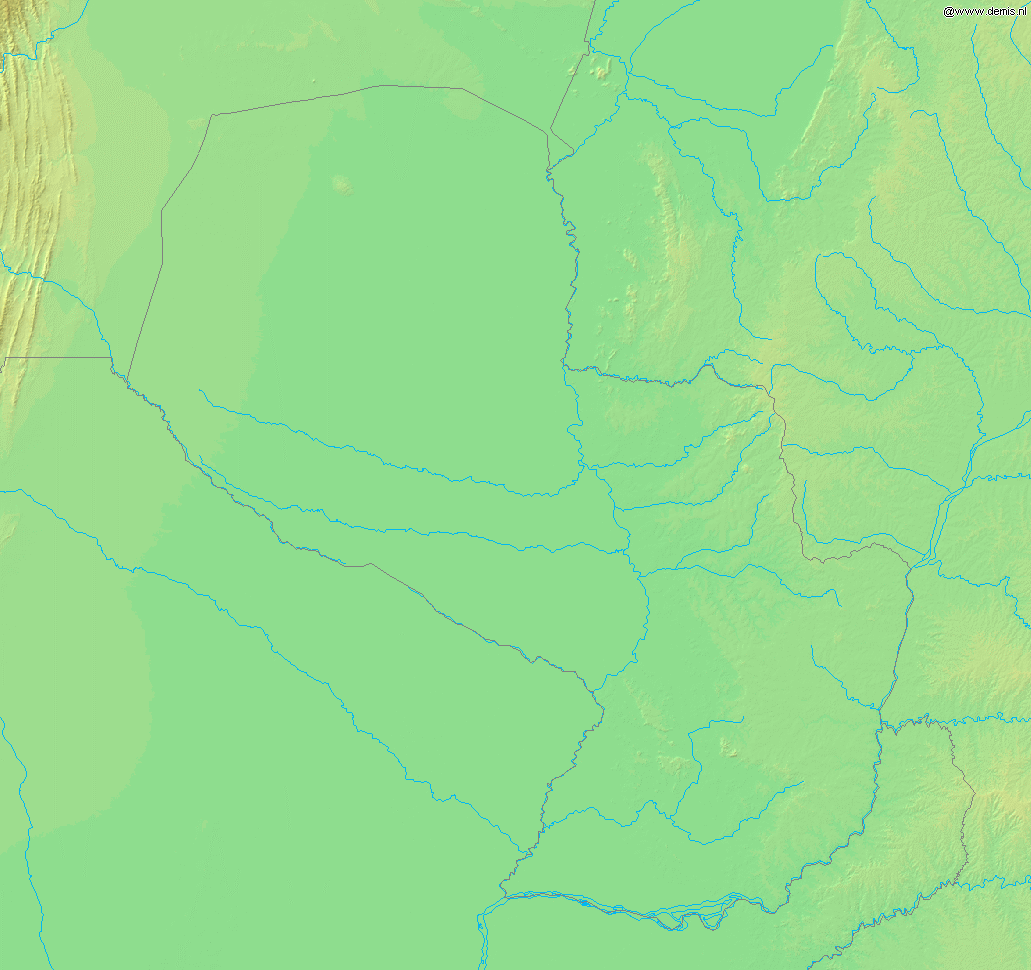
An enlargeable topographic map of Paraguay

Geography of Paraguay

- Paraguay is: a landlocked country
- Location:
  - Southern Hemisphere
  - Western Hemisphere
    - Latin America
      - South America
        - Southern Cone (definition varies as to whether Paraguay is included or not)
  - Time zone: UTC-04, October–March UTC-03
  - Extreme points of Paraguay
    - High: Cerro Peró 842 m (2,762 ft)
    - Low: Rio Paraguay 46 m (151 ft)
  - Land boundaries: 3,995 km

Argentina 1,880 km
Brazil 1,365 km
Bolivia 750 km

- Coastline: none

- Population of Paraguay: 6,127,000 - 103rd most populous country
- Area of Paraguay: 406752 km^{2}
- Atlas of Paraguay

=== Environment of Paraguay ===
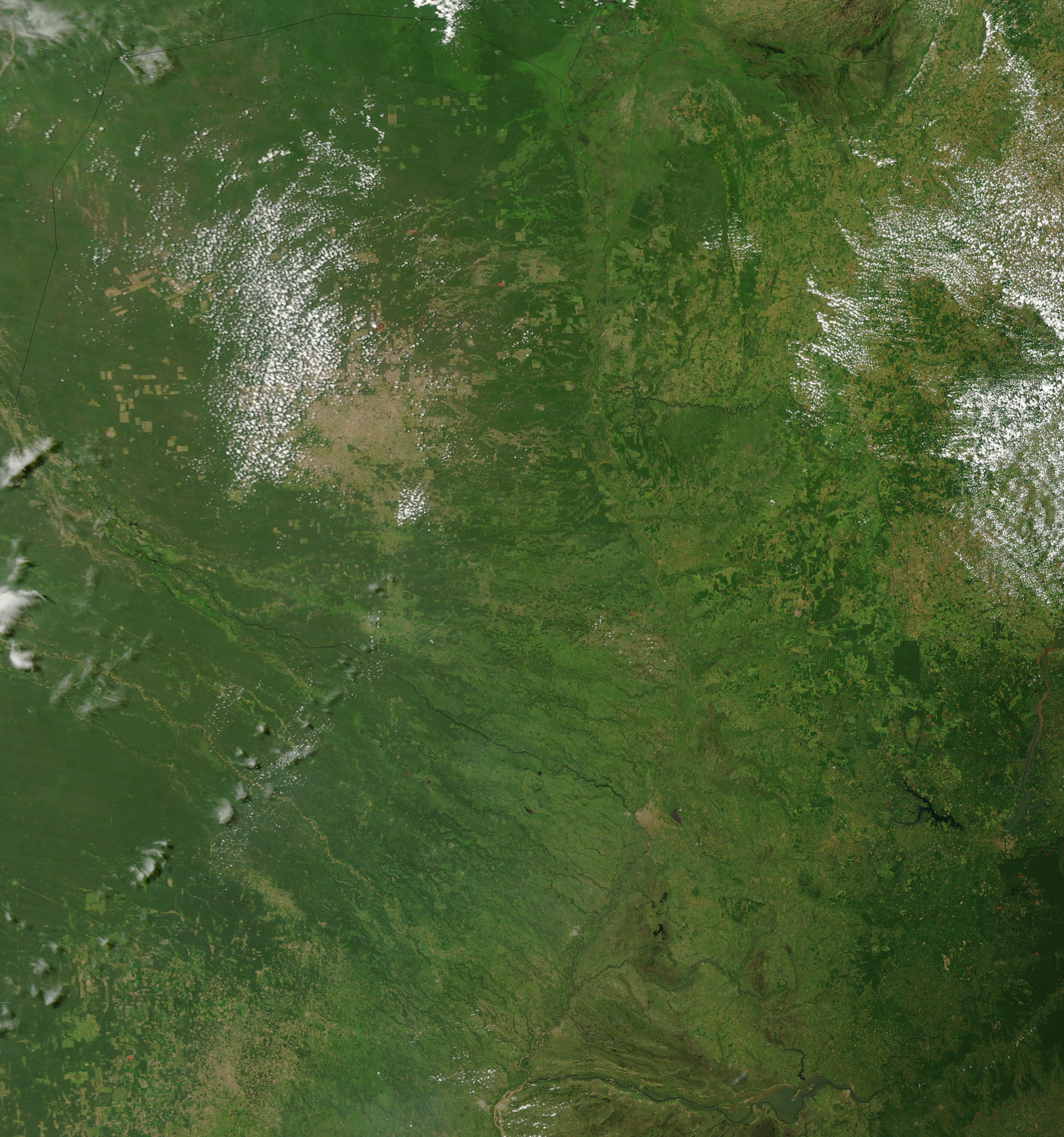
An enlargeable satellite image of Paraguay

Environment of Paraguay

- Climate of Paraguay
- Environmental issues in Paraguay
- Geology of Paraguay
- Protected areas of Paraguay
  - National parks of Paraguay
- Wildlife of Paraguay
  - Fauna of Paraguay
    - Birds of Paraguay
    - Mammals of Paraguay

==== Natural geographic features of Paraguay ====
- Islands of Paraguay
- Rivers of Paraguay
- World Heritage Sites in Paraguay

List of ecoregions in Paraguay

==== Administrative divisions of Paraguay ====
Administrative divisions of Paraguay

- Departments of Paraguay
  - Districts of Paraguay
  - Municipalities of Paraguay
- Capital of Paraguay: Asunción
- Cities of Paraguay

=== Demography of Paraguay ===
Demographics of Paraguay

== Government and politics of Paraguay ==
- Form of government:
- Capital of Paraguay: Asunción
- Elections in Paraguay
- Political parties in Paraguay

=== Branches of the government of Paraguay ===
Government of Paraguay

==== Executive branch of the government of Paraguay ====
- Head of state and head of government : President of Paraguay, Santiago Peña
- Cabinet of Paraguay

==== Legislative branch of the government of Paraguay ====
- Parliament of Paraguay (bicameral)
  - Upper house: Senate of Paraguay
  - Lower house: Chamber of Deputies of Paraguay

==== Judicial branch of the government of Paraguay ====
Court system of Paraguay

- Supreme Court of Paraguay

=== Foreign relations of Paraguay ===
Foreign relations of Paraguay

- Diplomatic missions in Paraguay
- Diplomatic missions of Paraguay

==== International organization membership ====
The Republic of Paraguay is a member of:

- Agency for the Prohibition of Nuclear Weapons in Latin America and the Caribbean (OPANAL)
- Andean Community of Nations (CAN) (associate)
- Food and Agriculture Organization (FAO)
- Group of 77 (G77)
- Inter-American Development Bank (IADB)
- International Atomic Energy Agency (IAEA)
- International Bank for Reconstruction and Development (IBRD)
- International Civil Aviation Organization (ICAO)
- International Criminal Court (ICCt)
- International Criminal Police Organization (Interpol)
- International Development Association (IDA)
- International Federation of Red Cross and Red Crescent Societies (IFRCS)
- International Finance Corporation (IFC)
- International Fund for Agricultural Development (IFAD)
- International Labour Organization (ILO)
- International Maritime Organization (IMO)
- International Monetary Fund (IMF)
- International Olympic Committee (IOC)
- International Organization for Migration (IOM)
- International Organization for Standardization (ISO) (correspondent)
- International Red Cross and Red Crescent Movement (ICRM)
- International Telecommunication Union (ITU)
- International Telecommunications Satellite Organization (ITSO)
- International Trade Union Confederation (ITUC)
- Inter-Parliamentary Union (IPU)
- Latin American Economic System (LAES)
- Latin American Integration Association (LAIA)
- Multilateral Investment Guarantee Agency (MIGA)
- Nonaligned Movement (NAM) (observer)
- Organisation for the Prohibition of Chemical Weapons (OPCW)
- Organization of American States (OAS)
- Permanent Court of Arbitration (PCA)
- Rio Group (RG)
- Southern Cone Common Market (Mercosur)
- Unión Latina
- Union of South American Nations (UNASUR)
- United Nations (UN)
- United Nations Conference on Trade and Development (UNCTAD)
- United Nations Educational, Scientific, and Cultural Organization (UNESCO)
- United Nations Industrial Development Organization (UNIDO)
- United Nations Mission for the Referendum in Western Sahara (MINURSO)
- United Nations Mission in Liberia (UNMIL)
- United Nations Mission in the Sudan (UNMIS)
- United Nations Operation in Côte d'Ivoire (UNOCI)
- United Nations Organization Mission in the Democratic Republic of the Congo (MONUC)
- United Nations Stabilization Mission in Haiti (MINUSTAH)
- Universal Postal Union (UPU)
- World Confederation of Labour (WCL)
- World Customs Organization (WCO)
- World Federation of Trade Unions (WFTU)
- World Health Organization (WHO)
- World Intellectual Property Organization (WIPO)
- World Meteorological Organization (WMO)
- World Tourism Organization (UNWTO)
- World Trade Organization (WTO)

=== Law and order in Paraguay ===
Law of Paraguay

- Cannabis in Paraguay
- Constitution of Paraguay
- Crime in Paraguay
- Human rights in Paraguay
  - LGBT rights in Paraguay
  - Freedom of religion in Paraguay
- Law enforcement in Paraguay

=== Military of Paraguay ===
Military of Paraguay

- Command
  - Commander-in-chief:
- Forces
  - Army of Paraguay
  - Navy of Paraguay: None
  - Air Force of Paraguay
- Military ranks of paraguay

=== Local government in Paraguay ===
Local government in Paraguay

== History of Paraguay ==
- Military history of Paraguay

Historic figures:

- José Gaspar Rodríguez de Francia
- Fulgencio Yegros
- Pedro Juan Caballero
- Carlos Antonio López
- Francisco Solano López
- Eliza Lynch
- José Félix Estigarribia
- Alfredo Stroessner
- Augusto Roa Bastos

== Culture of Paraguay ==
Culture of Paraguay

- Architecture of Paraguay
- Cuisine of Paraguay
- Languages of Paraguay
- Media in Paraguay
- National symbols of Paraguay
  - Coat of arms of Paraguay
  - Flag of Paraguay
  - National anthem of Paraguay
- Prostitution in Paraguay
- Public holidays in Paraguay
- Religion in Paraguay
  - Christianity in Paraguay
  - Hinduism in Paraguay
  - Islam in Paraguay
- World Heritage Sites in Paraguay

=== Art in Paraguay ===
- Art in Paraguay

- Paraguayan Indian art

- Cinema of Paraguay
- Music of Paraguay
- Television in Paraguay

=== Sports in Paraguay ===
Sports in Paraguay

- Football in Paraguay
- Paraguay at the Olympics

== Economy and infrastructure of Paraguay ==
Economy of Paraguay

- Economic rank, by nominal GDP (2007): 113th (one hundred and thirteenth)
- Agriculture in Paraguay
- Communications in Paraguay
  - Internet in Paraguay
- Companies of Paraguay
- Currency of Paraguay: Guaraní
  - ISO 4217: PYG
- Energy in Paraguay
- Health care in Paraguay
- Mining in Paraguay
- Tourism in Paraguay
- Transport in Paraguay
  - Airports in Paraguay
  - Rail transport in Paraguay
- Water supply and sanitation in Paraguay

== Education in Paraguay ==
Education in Paraguay

- List of high schools in Paraguay
- List of universities in Paraguay

== Health in Paraguay ==
Health in Paraguay

- List of hospitals in Paraguay

== See also ==
- Paraguay
- List of Paraguay-related topics
- List of international rankings
- Member state of the United Nations
- Outline of geography
- Outline of South America
