= Telecommunications in Paraguay =

Telecommunications in Paraguay are meager. Paraguay has the lowest fixed-line telephone density in South America, with 5.6 lines per 100 residents, compared with 8.7 per 100 in Bolivia, 21.9 in Brazil, and 24.9 in Argentina.

== Telephones ==
The state-owned Corporación Paraguaya de Comunicaciones (Copaco) is known for inefficiency and overstaffing. Privatization was attempted in 2002, but failed in the midst of the banking scandal.

With only 5.6 percent of the population having access to a land-line connection, the meager telephone network has resulted in rapid growth in mobile phone use.

- An extremely deprived and meager telephone service;
- Principal switching center is Asunción
- Domestic: microwave radio relay network
- International: satellite earth station - 1 Intelsat (Atlantic Ocean) in 2009
- International country code: 595
- Fixed telephone subscriptions: 364,557; 6.1% of the population in 2011
- Mobile-cellular telephone subscriptions: 6,529,053; 99.4% of the population in 2011

== Radio and television ==
As in many South American countries, radio is an important disseminator of information in Paraguay.

- Radio stations: roughly 75 commercial and community stations; one state-owned radio network in 2010
- Radios: 4.475,000 in 1997
- Television broadcast stations: 6 privately owned and one state-owned in 2010
- Televisions: 4.429,000 in 1997; 750,000 households in 2004

== Internet ==
- Country code (top level domain): .py
- Households with a computer: 22.7% in 2011
- Internet users: 1,543,715; 24% of the population in 2011 (95th in the world)
- Households with Internet access at home: 19.3% in 2011
- Internet hosts: 278,473; 64th in the world in 2010
- Fixed broadband Internet subscriptions: 28,147; 0.44% of the population in 2010
- IPv4 addresses allocated: 365,312; 5.6 per 100 inhabitants

== Censorship ==
The law provides for freedom of speech and press, and the government generally respects these rights in practice. Individuals criticize the government publicly and privately, generally without reprisal or impediment. There are no government restrictions on access to the Internet or credible reports that the government monitored e-mail or Internet chat rooms. Individuals and groups could engage in the expression of views via the Internet, including by e-mail.

=== Media crackdown following June 2012 Impeachment of Fernando Lugo ===
Following 22 June 2012 parliamentary coup that ousted President Fernando Lugo and made then Vice President, Federico Franco, the new president, the new government appears to be in the process of assuming complete control of the state-owned media and its hostility is affecting journalists with the privately owned media as well.

In what is seem as an attempt by the government to further control the media, the leader of the Paraguay Broadcasters Union (URP) has called for action against "more than 1,200 pirate radios operating in the country" which he accused of "inciting crime" on many occasions. He also asked the telecoms watchdog CONATEL to withdraw the licences of all stations implicated in what he termed illegal acts, without specifying what they were. There is tension between community radio stations, many of which were staunch opponents of 22 June coup, and the new government due to changes in the recently amended Telecommunications law that could adversely affect the future of community radio stations, many of which are poorly funded and not yet in possession of broadcasting licences. New clauses in the law place a ban on advertising on such stations, restrict their transmission range, and open the possibility of legal action against their representatives if they broadcast without a licence.

== See also ==
- Media of Paraguay
- List of internet service providers in Paraguay
- List of radio stations in Paraguay
- Telephone numbers in Paraguay
