= Mineral industry of Paraguay =

The mineral industry of Paraguay includes the production of cement, iron and steel, and petroleum derivatives. Paraguay has no known natural gas or oil reserves. To meet its crude oil and petroleum products demand, Paraguay relies completely on imports of approximately 25,400 barrels per day (4,040 m^{3}/d) (bbl/d) (2006 est.). The mining sector contributes little to the country's economy, accounting for only 0.1% of its gross domestic production (GDP).

Paraguay's tax exemptions on imports of equipment for natural gas and petroleum exploration, development, and production are expected to continue in the medium and long terms. Cement, natural gas, and petroleum investors have shown interest in the country, which could support continued economic growth and foreign direct investment (FDI) in new technologies well into the next decade.

== Production ==
In 2006, Paraguay produced mostly cement, clays, iron ore, natural gas, pig iron, and steel. Paraguay's mineral reserves and resources were unidentified.

== Structure of the mineral industry ==
The mineral industry of Paraguay mostly consists of Paraguayan state-owned firms. The structure of the country's mineral industry would, however, change, particularly in the natural gas sector, to a privately and/or joint-venture owned, government-regulated regime from one that was only government owned (Banco Central del Paraguay, 2007). FDI inflows to Mercosur increased to $25.1 billion in 2006 from $21 billion in 2005, or by 19.5%. Paraguay's FDI inflows increased to $116.6 million in 2006 from $74.6 million in 2005, which mostly reflected the high international prices of several commodities, such as cement, hydroelectric power, steel, sugar, textiles, and wood products.

== Commodities ==
=== Iron and steel ===
Paraguay produced 118,000 metric tons (t) of crude steel in 2006 compared with 101,000 t in 2005, which was an increase of 16.8%. The increase in metal prices and higher output of pig iron provided this boost to the steel sector. The country produced 126,000 t of pig iron in 2006 compared with 124,000 t in 2005, which was an increase of 1.6%.

=== Cement ===
In 2006, government-owned Industria nacional del Cemento (InC) was the only cement producer in Paraguay. In 2006, InC's cement production was about the same level as that of 2005 (550,000 t). In 2006, the national Customs department registered almost 100,000 t of imported cement; 85% of Paraguay's consumption (620,000 t) was satisfied by domestic production and 15% was imported.

In June 2006, the joint venture of three cement enterprises, Camargo Correa Cimentos S.a. and Votorantim Cimentos of Brazil and Concret-Mix Co. of Paraguay expressed interest in investing $17 million to build a cement mill in the city of Mariano roque alonso in Paraguay. The mill would have an annual production capacity of 200,000 t, which would be sold domestically and internationally. The plant is expected to meet about 25% of the future cement needs of Paraguay.

=== Natural gas ===
Paraguay has no proven natural gas reserves and no domestic production and does not consume natural gas. In June 2006, however, the governments of Bolivia and Paraguay approved a plan to construct a pipeline from southern Bolivia to Asuncion, Paraguay. The pipeline would have an initial capacity of 700 million cubic feet per day and would require an investment of about $2 billion.

Paraguay has attracted some interest from international natural gas companies, with CDS Energy S.A. (CdS) (the Paraguayan subsidiary of CDS Oil & Gas Group PLC of the United Kingdom) announcing in early 2005 that CDS had successfully completed a production test at its Independencia-1 well in the Chaco region of Paraguay.

Other companies that had signed exploration concessions with the Paraguayan government included Chaco Resources Plc, H.A. & E.R. Exploraciones, and Hidroener Consultora. Chaco had acquired two Paraguayan companies, Amerisur S.A. and Bohemia S.A., and obtained the right to approximately 4.7 million hectares held under three applications. Two of the applications covered about 2.4 million hectares, which encompassed the Curupayty and the San Pedro Blocks; the third concession was known as Canindeyu.

In August 2005, the Congress of Paraguay approved two acts that granted Chaco's subsidiary, Amerisur, two exploration concessions and one production permit for the Curupayty and the San Pedro Blocks. As a requirement of the Paraguayan legislation, Chaco was to select an area of no more than 800,000 hectares per block for its two concessions (Curupayty and San Pedro) in order to enter into a 4-year exploration phase.

Chaco's future plans for its Paraguay properties included the analysis and interpretation of the historical seismic data for all locations to produce regional structural maps of key seismic horizons and opportunities for joint venture partnerships for exploration. In 2006, CDS planned to finance its property obligations by securing additional financing or through joint-venture participation. The company also planned to continue exploration of deep Devonian gas in the Gabino Mendoza Block.

Although Paraguay has no conventional natural gas reserves, the U.S. Energy Information Administration estimates technically recoverable shale gas reserves of 75 trillion cubic feet.

=== Petroleum ===
State-owned Petróleos Paraguayos (Petropar) has a monopoly on all crude oil and petroleum product sales and imports in Paraguay. Petropar operates the country's sole refinery, the 7,500 bbl/d (1,190 m^{3}/d) Villa Elisa facility. In 2006, Paraguay's petroleum consumption amounted to 28,000 bbl/d (4,500 m^{3}/d). In September 2005, Paraguay and Venezuela discussed the possibility of building an oil refinery in Paraguay that could process Venezuela's heavy crude. This effort could help satisfy Paraguay's crude demand and Venezuela's supply to Paraguay could reach 15,000 bbl/d (2,400 m^{3}/d) of crude in the form of gasoil.

In February 2006, the Paraguayan government announced that crude oil had been discovered in the western Chaco region by CdS, but according to CdS, the reservoir was too tight to facilitate unassisted crude oil production. CdS planned to continue its exploration of shallow oil in the Emilia well, which is located within the Boqueron Block. although no hydrocarbon reserves had been proven at the Emilia prospect, it was considered the most potentially productive property of CdS with an estimated recoverable resource of 40,000,000 barrels (6,400,000 m^{3}) of oil.

Technically recoverable shale oil and condensate reserves for the country have been estimated at 3.8 billion barrels, with risked shale oil reserves being significantly higher.

== Outlook ==
Paraguay's economy is expected to continue to grow, but its GDP is likely to be highly dependent on the outcome of MErCOSur's economic stability and growth in 2007. According to the Banco Central del Paraguay (2007) and the Economic Commission for Latin America and the Caribbean (2007), leading transnational companies are interested in investing in the Paraguayan mineral industry and, in particular, in the cement, natural gas, and petroleum sectors. as an exporter of hydroelectricity, the country is poised to gain from the continued FDI inflows into its economy, which represented an increase of more than 56% in 2006 ($116.6 billion) compared with that of 2005 ($74.6 million).

The cement industry is expected to grow in 2007 if the planned construction of a new mill by the joint venture of Camargo, Concrete-Mix, and Votorantim takes place; annual production at the mill is expected to cover about 20% of Paraguay's future cement demand. The Paraguayan mineral fuels sector is set to continue its exploration activities during 2007 and beyond owing to CdS's and Chaco's continued exploration efforts.

In 2010 CIC Resources Inc., the same company that discovered the copper deposits in Chile, claims to have discovered 21 billion metric tons of titanium, which could be the biggest titanium deposit in the world, in Alto Parana near frontier with Brazil.

== See also ==
- Energy in Paraguay
