= Acaray River =

River in eastern Paraguay

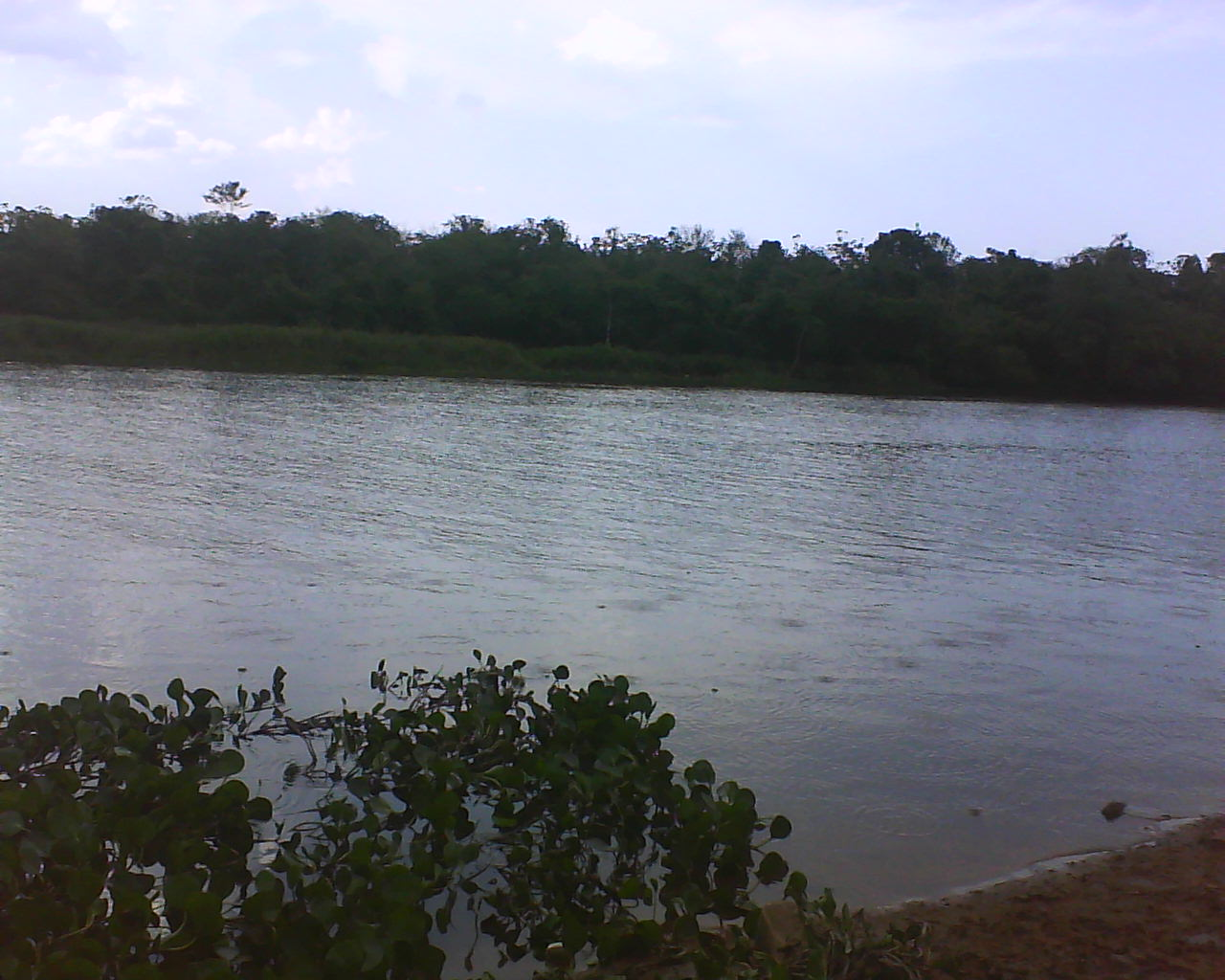
- The Acaray River between Minga Guazú and Hernandarias.

- Mouth

Location
- Country: Paraguay

Physical characteristics
- Source
  - location: Cordillera de Caaguazú
  - elevation: 220 metres (720 ft)
- Mouth
  - location: Paraná River
  - coordinates: 25°29′S 54°42′W
  - elevation: 125–130 metres (410–427 ft)
- Length: 160 kilometres (99 mi)

The Acaray River (Guarani Akaray) is a river in eastern Paraguay. It is born in the Cordillera de Caaguazú, and is joined by the Yguazú and Itakyry rivers later on. The river flows through the Caaguazú and Alto Paraná Departments, and joins the Paraná River in an area between Ciudad del Este and Hernadarias, which was later modified for the construction of the Acaray Dam. One of its main tributaries is the Yguazú River, which also has its own dam: the Yguazú Dam.

== See also ==
- List of rivers of Paraguay
