= Energy in Paraguay =

Total energy supply 2021
1. Hydropower (37.5%)
2. Oil (29.9%)
3. Biofuels and waste (32.6%)
4. Coal (0.01%)

Energy in Paraguay is primarily sourced from hydropower, with pivotal projects like the Itaipu Dam, one of the world's largest hydroelectric facilities. This reliance underscores the need for a robust infrastructure, including efficient transmission networks and distribution systems, to leverage the country's renewable resources fully.

Despite its extensive hydroelectric capacity, Paraguay faces environmental challenges, notably deforestation, exacerbated by the widespread use of firewood. This issue has spurred governmental action to promote more sustainable energy alternatives, such as biomass energy projects and efficient cooking technologies, to preserve the nation's forests.

Petróleos Paraguayos (Petropar), the state-owned enterprise, holds a monopoly over the sale and import of crude oil and petroleum products, operating Paraguay's only refinery, the 7,500 bbl/d Villa Elisa facility. This monopoly raises concerns about market competition and energy pricing, potentially impacting the broader energy sector's dynamics, including the adoption of new renewable technologies.

Total renewable energy capacity 2014–2023 (MW)
2014	2015	2016	2017	2018	2019	2020	2021	2022	2023
8,849	8,849	8,849	8,849	8,849	8,851	8,852	8,852	8,853	8,853

Under its National Development Plan 2014–2030, Paraguay aims for renewable energy, including solar and wind, to comprise 60% of its total energy consumption by 2030, while reducing fossil fuel use by 20%. This initiative is supported by policies like renewable energy subsidies and considerations for fossil fuel taxes.

Integration into the South American power market is crucial for Paraguay, enhancing regional energy trade and cooperation. This integration is anticipated to yield significant economic benefits through energy exports and bolster regional energy security. The strategic emphasis on expanding renewable energy sources is aimed not only at fulfilling environmental commitments but also at stimulating economic growth, creating jobs, and supporting industrial development. These efforts are integral to enhancing the resilience and sustainability of Paraguay's energy sector.

== Oil ==
Paraguay consumed 28,000 bbl/d (4,500 m^{3}/d) of petroleum in 2006. It does not currently produce any crude oil. In February 2006, Paraguay's Public Works Ministry announced that oil had been discovered in the western Chaco region by British oil company CDS Energy Services, though CDS stated that the reservoir was too tight to facilitate unassisted oil production.

State-owned Petróleos Paraguayos (Petropar) has a monopoly on all crude oil and petroleum product sales and imports in Paraguay. It operates Paraguay's sole refinery, the 7,500 bbl/d (1,190 m^{3}/d) Villa Elisa facility.

Like many oil-importing countries in the Western Hemisphere, Paraguay has tried to foster the development of special deals for importing crude oil and refined products from Venezuela. Paraguay, along with Uruguay, signed a deal in 2005 to receive crude oil imports from Venezuela under preferential financing terms. In December 2005, ANCAP and PdVSA, the Uruguayan and Venezuelan national oil companies, agreed to fund a study for the proposed doubling of the capacity at the La Teja plant. The project, which would cost an estimated $800 million, would also upgrade facilities at the refinery so that it could handle heavier Venezuelan crude varieties.

In 2021, oil represented 37.4% of Paraguay's total energy supply, totaling 116,461 terajoules. This figure indicates a substantial increase, with a 154% rise in oil supply from the year 2000 to 2021. This significant component of Paraguay's energy mix underscores the country's reliance on oil-based fuels, which remain essential for powering automobiles, aircraft, and ships. Despite the critical role of oil in supporting modern transportation and industry, it also poses environmental challenges due to its substantial CO_{2} emissions. Paraguay, like many other countries, is facing the complex task of balancing its dependence on oil with the urgent need to reduce its environmental impact.

== Natural gas ==
Paraguay has no proven natural gas reserves, and it neither produces nor consumes natural gas. In recent years, the country has sought to promote the consumption of natural gas as a way to decrease the use of firewood and charcoal, which has contributed to deforestation in the country. However, barriers to natural gas consumption include a lack of domestic natural gas production and the absence of import pipelines.

Paraguay has attracted some interest from international natural gas companies, with UK-based CDS Oil & Gas announcing in early 2004 that it had successfully completed a production test at its Independencia-1 well in the northwestern part of the country. Other companies that have signed exploration concessions with Paraguay's government include H.A & E.R. Exploraciones, Pilcomayo Petróleos S.A., Hidroener Consultora, Guaraní Exploration, Union Oil, Paraguay Gas, Boreal Petróleos, Aurora Petróleos and Amerisur.

Paraguay has pursued several natural gas import options. In 2001, Brazil proposed the Gas Integration Project (Gasin), a natural gas pipeline linking Argentina, Bolivia, Brazil, and Paraguay. There has not been much progress to date on the implementation of this proposal. In 2002, the Bolivian and Paraguayan governments signed a preliminary agreement allowing for the construction of a pipeline from southern Bolivia to Asuncion. In June 2006, the two governments approved a plan to move forward with the pipeline, which would have an initial capacity of 700 million cubic feet per day (20,000,000 m^{3}/d) and require an investment of at least $2 billion.

== Electricity ==
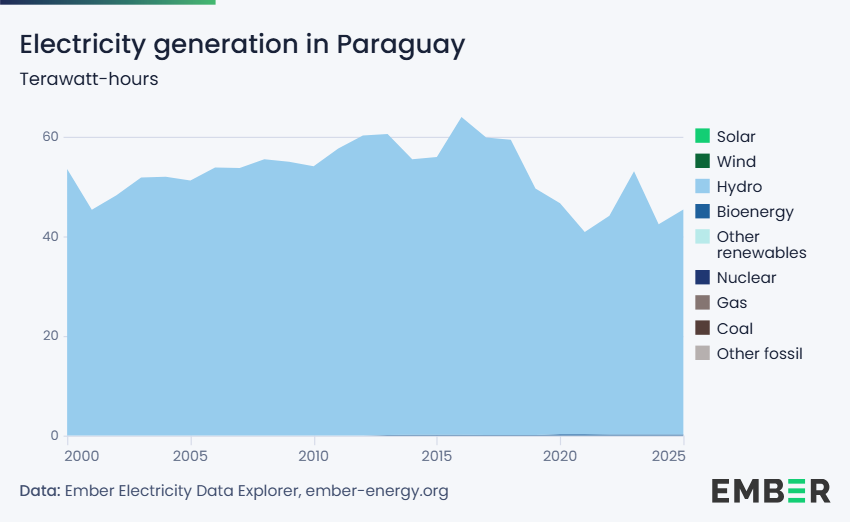
Electricity generation in Paraguay in terawatt-hours

Paraguay generated 51.8 terawatt-hours of electricity in 2004, while consuming only 3.1 TWh. Almost all of the country's electricity production comes from a single facility, the bi-national Itaipu dam. Paraguay is one of the world's largest net exporters of electric power.

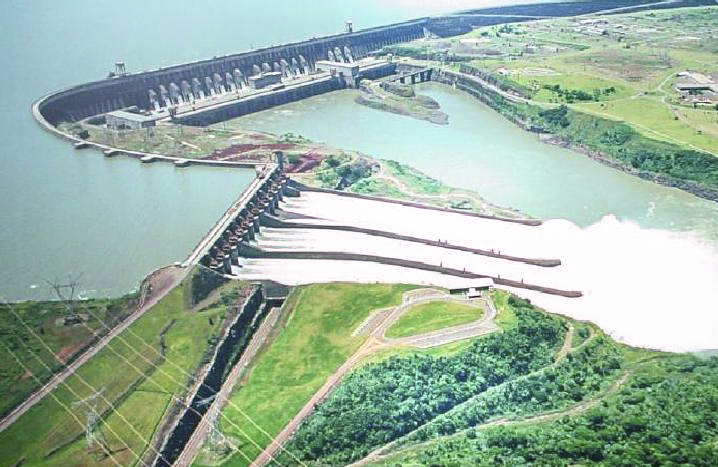
Itaipu Dam

Paraguay's state-owned utility, Administracion Nacional de Electricidad (ANDE), controls the country's entire electricity market, including generation, distribution and transmission. It operates a single hydroelectric dam, Acaray, and six thermal power plants, with total installed capacity of 220 megawatts (MW). The company is also responsible for Paraguay's share of two bi-national hydroelectric facilities (see below). ANDE operates 3,400 kilometres (2,100 mi) of transmission lines and 1,080 km (670 mi) of distribution lines. Over 92 percent of the country has electricity service.

Electricity supply, 2019 (GWh)
Generated
Acaray	979.9	1.8%
Itaipú	39,448.9	80.0%
Yacyretá	9,017.0	18.2%
Thermal	1.8	0.0%
Total supply	49,447.6	100%
Sold
Itaipú (Sale to Brazil)	24,280.2	49.1%
Yacyretá (Sale to Argentina)	7467.8	15.1%
Total sold	31,748.0	64.2%
Domestic use
Domestic use	13,229.4	26.8%
System losses
System losses	4,470.5	9.0%

Paraguay operates two hydroelectric dams in cooperation with its neighbors: Itaipu (Brazil) and Yacyreta (Argentina). The Itaipu dam was the largest hydroelectric facility in the world, before the completion of the Three Gorges Dam in China. Itaipu has 20 generators and a total installed capacity of 14,000 MW, evenly shared between Paraguay and Brazil. In 2004, Paraguay consumed 16 percent of its share of Itaipu production, exporting the rest to Brazil. Yacyreta, completed in 1999, has 20 generators and a total installed capacity of 3,100 MW. In 2014 Paraguay consumed almost 5 percent of its share of Yacyreta's production, exporting the rest to Argentina. Under the treaty to operate the Itaipú Dam, electricity from the dam allocated to Paraguay that is unused is sold to Brazil at a cheap price. In September 2006, Ente Binacional Yacyreta, the binational company responsible for operating the facility, announced that it was cancelling the planned Aña Cuá expansion of the facility.

=== List of power stations ===
Station	Location	Capacity (MW)
Itaipu Dam	25°24′30″S 54°35′21″W	14,000
Yacyretá Dam	27°28′58″S 56°43′30″W	3,100
Acaray Dam	25°27′34″S 54°37′45″W	210
Yguazú Dam	25°22′34″S 54°57′55″W	300

In 2021, Paraguay produced a total of 40,576 GWh of electricity, marking a 24% increase from the year 2000. The country has become a significant net exporter of electricity, exporting 53.5% of its total production in the same year, which represents a 54% increase in electricity exports over the same period. Per capita, the electricity consumption in Paraguay was 2.086 MWh in 2021, showing a substantial increase of 127% since 2000.

Electricity final consumption by sector, 2021
Sector	TJ	Percentage
Industry	8824	17.88%
Residential	22230	45.06%
Commercial and public services	18287	37.06%

This growth in per capita consumption highlights the rapid expansion in access to electricity and energy use within the country. In terms of final electricity consumption, the residential sector is the largest consumer, accounting for 45% of the total, followed by commercial and public services, which consume 37%. These figures underscore the importance of electricity in Paraguay's ongoing development and economic activities.

== See also ==
- Mineral industry of Paraguay
