= Villa Elisa Refinery =

Oil refinery in Paraguay

Coordinates: 25.3869172°S 57.6039085°W

- Interactive map of Villa Elisa Refinery
- Location: Villa Elisa, Paraguay

Refinery details
- Operator: Petróleos Paraguayos
- Owner: Petróleos Paraguayos
- Capacity: 7,500 barrels (1,190 m3)

Villa Elisa Refinery is an oil refinery located in Villa Elisa, 15 km (9.3 mi) from Asunción, close to the Paraguay River, and owned by the Paraguay national oil company Petróleos Paraguayos. The refinery is capable of processing 7,500 barrels (1,190 m^{3}) of crude oil per day (1,200 m^{3}/day) and produces lubricants, diesel, kerosene, naphtha and LPG.

The refining complex also has 42 tanks used to retain crude oil and refined products with a total capacity of 320,000 m^{3} and four LPG tanks with a capacity of 2,000 m^{3} each. There is also an oil terminal located on the Paraguay River that has 27 jetties and a loading and unloading capacity of 10,000 m^{3} per day, and a barge terminal used for loading and unloading of LPG.
