= Villa Elisa, Paraguay =

Villa Elisa
- City
- Parroquia Virgen del Carmen

- Location within Paraguay
- Coordinates: 25°30′27″S 57°34′21″W
- Country: Paraguay
- Department: Central
- Founded: 1938

Government
  - Intendente Municipal: Ricardo Estigarribia

Area
  - Total: 122 km^{2} (47 sq mi)
- Elevation: 116 m (381 ft)

Population (2022)
  - Total: 71,383
  - Density: 585/km^{2} (1,520/sq mi)
- Time zone: UTC-4
- Postal code: 2610
- Area code: (595) (021)
- Climate: Cfa

Villa Elisa (Spanish pronunciation: [ˈbiʎa eˈlisa]) is a city in the Central Department of Paraguay on the outskirts of Asunción. It was the only colony that was inhabited by Swedish people in Paraguay. It became part of the metropolitan area of the capital. It was founded on March 22, 1938.

== History ==
After the Paraguayan War, Paraguay was receiving European immigrants, who were given land for agricultural production and cattle breeding. Around 1890, Belgium immigrants founded the colony of Mbocayaty, later supplemented by French and Italian people around 1880 and 1890.

The inhabitants began to work in agriculture, especially in fruit production. Belgians later migrated to the properties of a Dane named Emilio Johansen. Around 1896, the city became Colonia Elisa, as an homage to his wife, Elisa Von Poleski. Elisa was of aristocratic German origin and later had a street named for her.

The first Administrative Board of Villa Elisa was created on June 21, 1899, under Johansen's direction. With the arrival of more immigrants from Scandinavia and Germany in 1900 and 1940, the population grew, requiring new institutions, since Paraguay was experiencing internal conflicts and the Chaco War with Bolivia, 1932–1935.

A petroleum refinery operated by Petróleos Paraguayos (Petropar) is located in Villa Elisa. This refinery was later transformed into an autarquic company on January 9, 1986.

== Geography ==
Villa Elisa is located 16 km from Asunción. The city borders to the north Asunción and Fernando de la Mora, to the east San Lorenzo and Ñemby, to the west Lambare, and to the south San Antonio and the Paraguay River.

Villa Elisa has 16 neighborhoods, including San Juan, Villa Bonita, Mbocayaty, Picada, Sol de América, Gloria María, Ypaty, San Miguel, Rosedal, 29 de Setiembre y 3 Bocas.

The Central Department ranges from 58 to 250 meters above sea level.

Villa Elisa has sandy soil covered by vegetation. The climate is subtropical. The maximum temperature is in the summer and it reaches 39 degrees Celsius; the minimum in winter is 1 degree. The annual median is 22.

== Government ==
The Town Hall belongs to the first category (Decree 12..192/01) . Twelve advisors comprise the Legislative power of the Town Hall, They represent the National Republican Association, or Red Party(6), Radical Liberal Party (5) and the party Patria Querida (1). The mayor is Ricardo Estigarribia, belonging to the Liberal Party.

== Culture and gastronomy ==
The local festival is celebrated on July 16 in memory of Virgin of the Carmen, the patron of the city. Masses, delicious food, and traditional games take place all over the country, including pelota tata (fire ball) toro candil, walking on fire, and yvyra syi (soap stick).

Other events include student parades, religious parades and recognition of important dates, such as Child Day, remembrance of the soldiers who fought in the Triple Alianza War, festival of Youth and other artistic shows. It was made a sub-location of the Lake Festival of Ypacaray. It is known as the folk capital of the south.

Villa Elisa, like all Paraguayan cities, enjoys typical country food such as Mbeju, Chipa Asador, pastel mandi`o, ryguasu ka`e, lampreado, butifarra, Chicharó trenzado, and Chipa so'o.

== Economy ==
It has many industries, commercial areas and services. Its agricultural activity is fruit production. A great part of the population works in the capital of the country.
