= Deforestation in Paraguay =

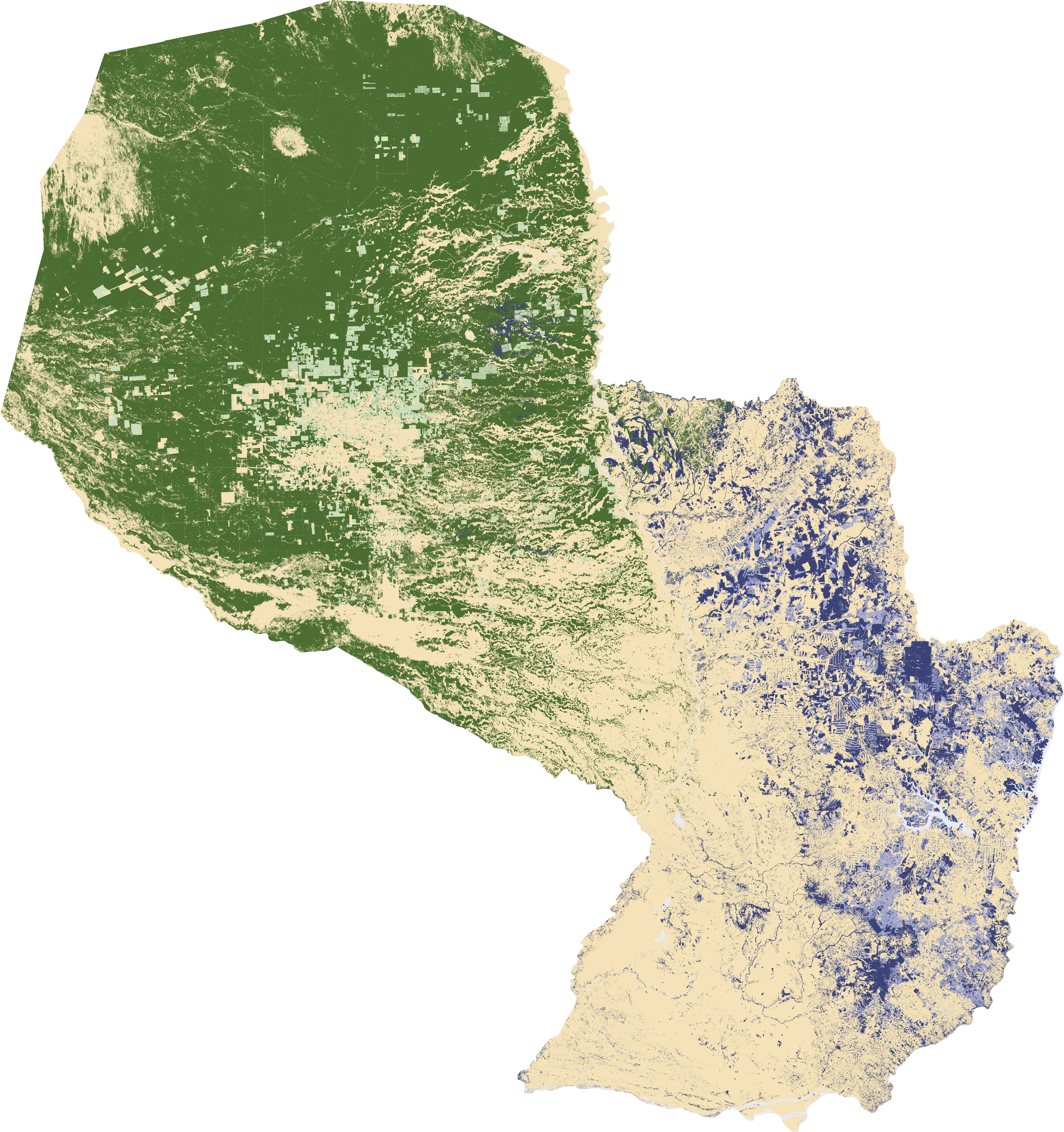
Deforestation in Paraguay, between 1990 and 2000, as per NASA. Green: Gran Chaco vegetation. Blue:Atlantic Forest vegetation. Dark colors represent the remnants in 2000, the light colors that was deforested between 1990 and 2000. Open the same image in highest resolution, then zoom in to see the difference between the light and dark colours.

The deforestation in Paraguay is the process of destruction or depletion of the forest cover in Paraguay. Between 1970 and the year 2000, Paraguay lost more than 50% of its Atlantic Forest cover. Deforestation is also advancing in the Alto Paraguay Department, where most of the forest area was already lost during the period 2007 to 2012.

According to official data by the Servicio Forestal Nacional, in the Eastern Region, in a period of 40 years, between 1945 and 1985, about 5 million hectares of forest were lost, calculated at an average of 123,000 hectares per year. In the period between the years 1968 and 1976, the amount of deforestation in the region rose to 212,000 hectares per year. in the period between 1985 and 1991, according to research by the Carrera de Ingeniería Forestal (CIF, UNA) deforestation rates were higher yet again, at a rate of approximately 300,000 hectares per year, recording the elimination of a total of approximately 2 million hectares of forest.

Between 1990 and 2000, Paraguay lost about 13 percent of its forests, including nearly 40 percent of the Atlantic Forest.

Deforestation rates in the Paraguayan Chaco tripled between 2006 and 2007.

In 2004, Law No. 2524 on Zero Deforestation (Ley de Deforestación Cero) was enacted, which prohibited deforestation in the Eastern Region of Paraguay. In 2020, the law was extended for another ten years.

Between 2001 and 2019, Paraguay was the South American country with the second highest rate of deforestation according to Global Forest Watch (GWF), behind only Brazil.

The Gran Chaco region (stretches across parts of Paraguay, Argentina, and Bolivia), home to the second largest forest in Latin America (behind only the Amazon rainforest) has one of the highest deforestation rates globally. Deforestation has been particularly widespread in Paraguay in recent years. Across all the countries, between 1985 and 2013, more than 142,000 square kilometers of the Gran Chaco's forests (equaling 20% of all forest) was replaced by croplands (38.9%) or grazing lands (61.1%). Of those grazing lands that existed in 1985, about 40% were subsequently converted to cropland.

== Causes and distribution ==
The main causes of deforestation in Paraguay are the expansion of the agricultural frontier and livestock farming. Indirect causes of deforestation include a low level of institutionalization and difficulties in implementing territorial planning schemes. Between 1987 and 2012, around 44,000 square kilometers of forests were lost in Paraguay, mainly due to the expansion of cattle farms in the western part of the country.

A significant part of deforestation occurs on illegally acquired lands. The high concentration of land ownership in large territorial areas drives the advance of the agricultural frontier and livestock farming. The Gini coefficient for the land (an indicator between 0 and 1 where 1 represents the maximum inequality), for Paraguay is 0.93, the most unequal land ownership in Latin America. This great inequality in land distribution dates back to the Triple Allicane War, with Paraguay losing more than 334,000 square kilometers to Brazil, resulting in a consolidation of an oligarchic states and the formation of large estates. An added problem is that some lands have ceased to be arable due to land degradation and massive use of agrochemicals. This problem, together with the rise in poverty drives migration to cities, where poverty belts grow. Due to the deepening of the crisis of peasant agriculture and persecution of landless peasants who make occupations, there was a higher population growth between 2008 and 2017 in cities such as Limpio and Villa Hayes. Landless peasants are involved in occupying land illegally, sometimes called invadors.

In 2023 and 2024, in the Western Region, most of the fires occurred in the Presidente Hayes Department. During the same years, in the Eastern Region, the San Pedro Department had the most fires. Reported on the 1st of October 2020, when within 24 hours, there were more than 12,000 fires raging in Paraguay, the Presidente Hayes Department was the department with the highest number of fires in Paraguay, with 8,617 different fires recorded in the last 24 hours, with the city of Villa Hayes concentrating most of them with 6,105 hotspots in the same time period.

An investigation by the NGO Earthsight in September 2020 exposed the company Cooperativa Chortitzer's role in the illegal encroachment and deforesting of 2,600 hectares within the Ayoreo Totobiegosode Natural and Cultural Heritage site. Located in the Alto Paraguay region of the Paraguayan Chaco, this territory belongs to the last indigenous group in South America living in voluntary isolation outside the Amazon. The deforestation was driven by the goal to clear land for cattle to supply the leather used in European luxury car interiors, of car companies Jaguar Land Rover and BMW.

Paraguay is Latin America’s largest marijuana producer, and this has caused severe deforestation. In October 2020 more than 5,000 forest fires were intentionally set, which the government linked to agricultural activities or marijuana cultivation.

== Anthropogenic fires and land grabs for converting the land use to agriculture ==
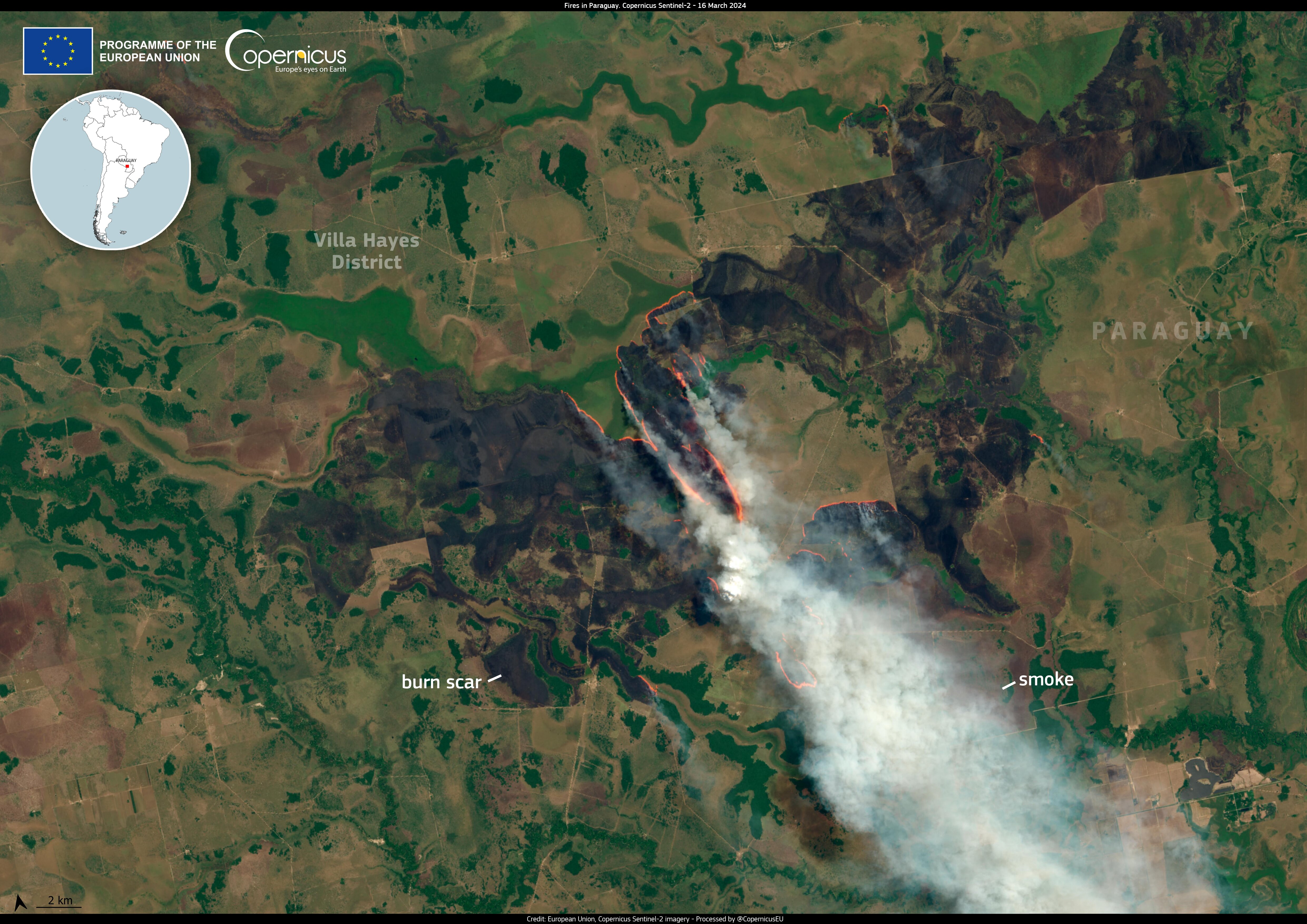
Satellite view of fires burning in Vila Hayes, Paraguay, March 20, 2024

According to data from the Instituto Forestal Nacional (INFONA), in 2019, 2,450,749 hectares were burned. In 2020, 3,494,109 hectares and in 2023, 1,119,096 hectares. The majority of the fires are caused by human activities. Anthropogenic fires are utilized by the agribusiness sector as a tool to facilitate illegal land grabbing and the expansion of the agricultural frontier. There are almost no state controls to enforce environmental and labor regulations, resulting in displacement of indigenous communities such as the Ayoreo.

Invadors, sometimes armed, for example groups who engage in cattle rustling, are named as illegally burning pastures and occupying land. In December 2025, a failed attempt to invade the 'Lucipar' ranch in the San Pedro department, resulted in the detention of 42 invadors. The group identifies itself as "Sin Tierra" / "Campesinos Sin Tierra".

On February 5, 2026, a property in Villa Hayes, which had been illegally occupied for the second time for about a week, was affected by a large fire that ultimately consumed around 500 hectares. The invadors were believed to be the only people present at the site. It is suspected that the fire was started by a group of invaders identifying themselves as "Sin Tierra" / "Campesinos Sin Tierra". The smoke from the fire reached the city of Asunción.

Since 2019 to August 2021, the Paraguayan National Police have recorded 955 private property invasions, with over 221 occurring in Asunción and 211 in the Central Department. Councilman Álvaro Grau has claimed there is a big lucrative business behind the invadors, but that the process is disguised as agrarian reform, and that the occupations also extend beyond rural areas, affecting urban farms and construction lots.

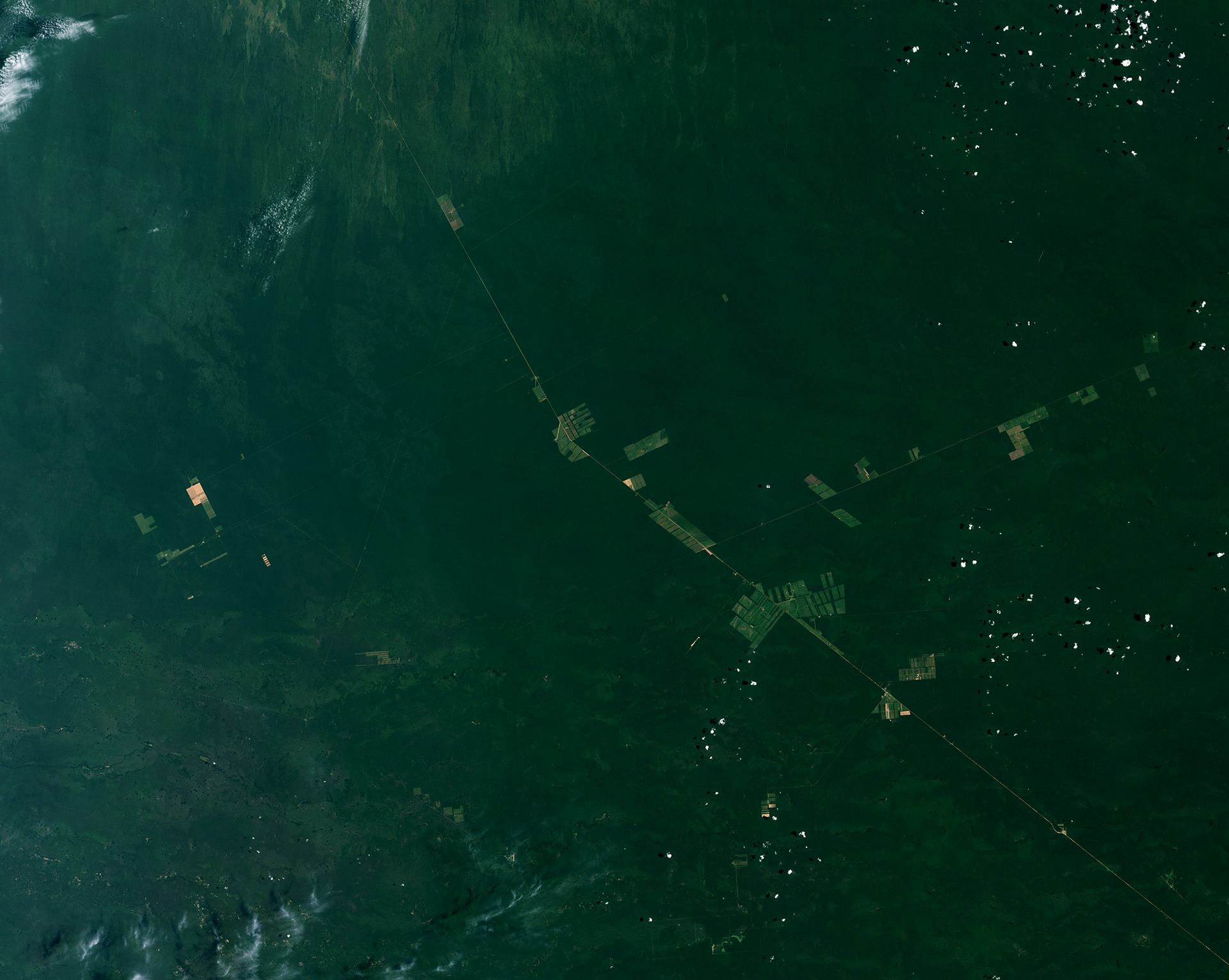
A satellite image showing the same area in the Gran Chaco, forested in 1985 (slide to the other image in this slideshow to see the same area in 2025).

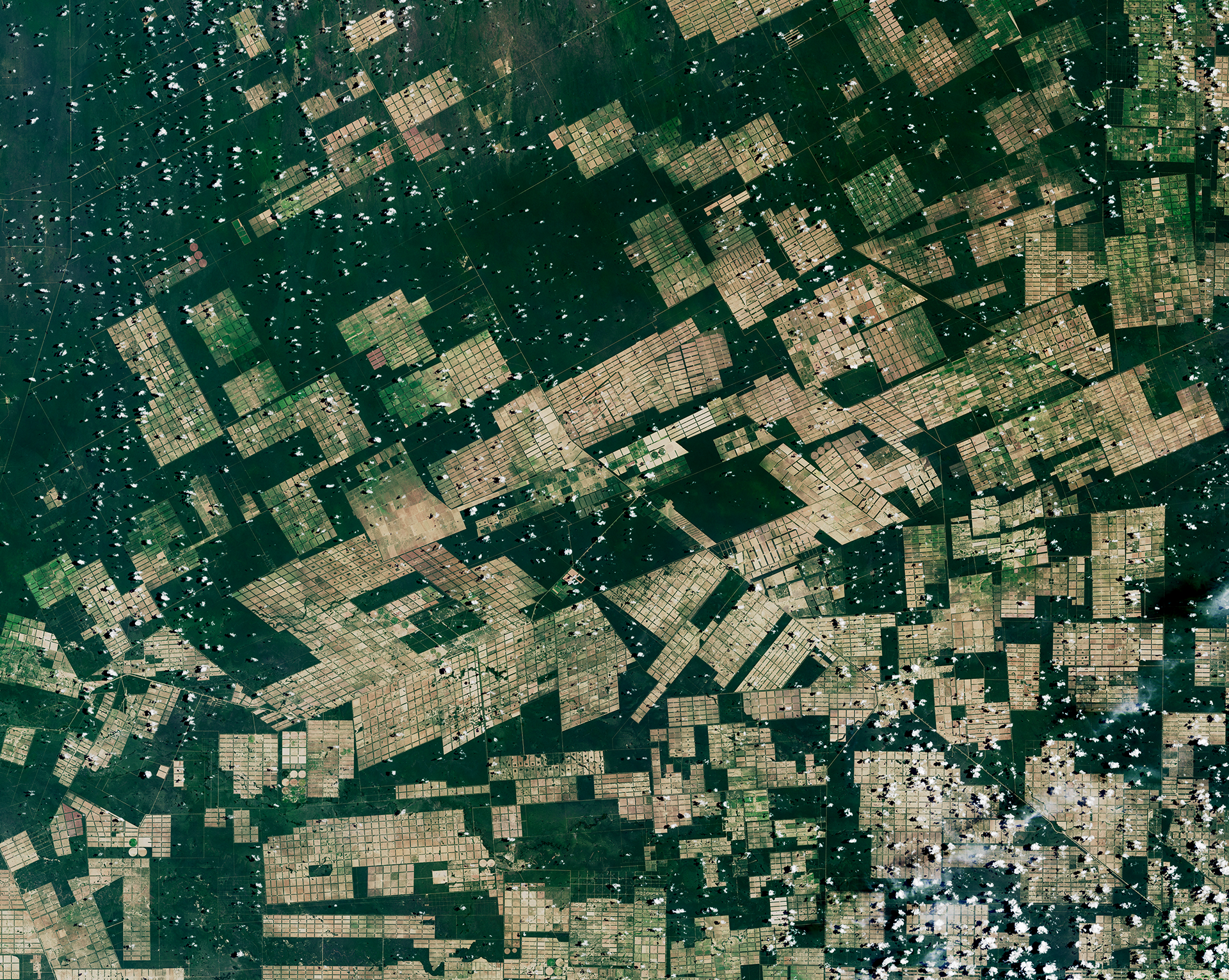
A satellite image showing the same area in the Gran Chaco, deforested in 2025 and changed in land use to agriculture (slide to the other image in this slideshow to see the same area in 1985).

== Tree cover extent and loss ==
Global Forest Watch publishes annual estimates of tree cover loss and 2000 tree cover extent derived from time-series analysis of Landsat satellite imagery in the Global Forest Change dataset. In this framework, tree cover refers to vegetation taller than 5 m (including natural forests and tree plantations), and tree cover loss is defined as the complete removal of tree cover canopy for a given year, regardless of cause.

For Paraguay, country statistics report cumulative tree cover loss of 7,218,927 ha (72,189.27 km^{2}) from 2001 to 2024 (about 29.7% of its 2000 tree cover area). For tree cover density greater than 30%, country statistics report a 2000 tree cover extent of 24,273,209 ha (242,732.09 km^{2}). The charts and table below display this data. In simple terms, the annual loss number is the area where tree cover disappeared in that year, and the extent number shows what remains of the 2000 tree cover baseline after subtracting cumulative loss. Forest regrowth is not included in the dataset.

Annual tree cover loss in Paraguay, 2001–2024. View chart definition.
Tree cover extent in 2000 minus cumulative tree cover loss in Paraguay, 2001–2024 (loss-only residual; does not account for gain). View chart definition.

Annual tree cover extent and loss
Year	Tree cover extent (km2) (Note: This residual measure does not include forest regrowth.)	Annual tree cover loss (km2)
2001	241,229.74	1,502.35
2002	239,278.56	1,951.18
2003	236,605.50	2,673.06
2004	234,132.14	2,473.36
2005	231,506.02	2,626.12
2006	230,023.46	1,482.56
2007	225,761.55	4,261.91
2008	221,998.58	3,762.97
2009	218,466.87	3,531.71
2010	214,044.08	4,422.79
2011	209,472.33	4,571.75
2012	204,370.19	5,102.14
2013	201,185.05	3,185.14
2014	197,727.67	3,457.38
2015	194,934.62	2,793.05
2016	191,736.69	3,197.93
2017	188,135.94	3,600.75
2018	185,548.24	2,587.70
2019	182,418.38	3,129.86
2020	179,985.12	2,433.26
2021	177,217.95	2,767.17
2022	175,046.52	2,171.43
2023	173,201.01	1,845.51
2024	170,542.82	2,658.19

== REDD+ reference levels and monitoring ==
Under the UNFCCC REDD+ framework, Paraguay has submitted two national forest reference emission level (FREL) packages. On the UNFCCC REDD+ Web Platform, both the 2016 and 2022 packages are listed as having assessed reference levels and reported national strategies and safeguards; a national forest monitoring system is listed as reported for the 2016 package but as "not reported" for the 2022 package.

The first assessed FREL, submitted in 2016, covered the REDD+ activity "reducing emissions from deforestation" at national scale. Using a 2000-2015 historical reference period, the modified and assessed FREL was 58,763,376.14 t CO2 eq per year, revised from 60,388,964.99 t CO2 eq per year in the original submission. The technical assessment states that the benchmark represented the annual average of CO2 emissions from gross deforestation in native forests, and included above-ground biomass, below-ground biomass and understory vegetation, while excluding deadwood, litter and soil organic carbon.

A second national FREL, submitted in 2022, again covered reducing emissions from deforestation at national scale. Using a 2012-2019 historical reference period, the modified and assessed FREL was 53,943,964.4 t CO2 eq per year, revised from 53,116,279.0 t CO2 eq per year in the original submission. The technical assessment states that it again represented annual average CO2 emissions from gross deforestation and included above-ground biomass, below-ground biomass and understory vegetation, while excluding deadwood, litter and soil organic carbon.

== See also ==
- Environmental issues in Paraguay
- Deforestation in Brazil
