= Freedom of religion in Paraguay =

Freedom of religion in Paraguay is provided for in the Constitution of Paraguay.

In 2023, the country was scored 4 out of 4 for religious freedom.

== Religious demography ==
In 2018, Latinobarómetro noted that the religious demographics of the country were as follows; Catholicism 88.3%, Protestantism 6.8%, Other Christian 0.9% and other religions 1.4%; about 2.6% had no religious beliefs.

Other groups included the Catholic Christian Apostolic National Church of Paraguay (ICCAN), the Church of Jesus Christ, Islam, Judaism, Buddhism, Mennonites, the Unification Church and Baha’is. Members of minority religious groups are concentrated in the largest cities, including Asunción, Ciudad del Este, and Encarnación.

== Legal/policy framework ==
The Catholic Church maintains an influential role in society; the country observes Christmas, Easter, Virgin of Caacupé Day, and the Founding of Asuncion as holidays.

Religious education is banned in public schools.

The Constitution provides for conscientious objection to military service, as long as this is on religious grounds.

Missionaries are required to register in the country, but can work freely. Most are from Catholic, Church of Jesus Christ, or evangelical backgrounds.

== Restrictions on and abuses of religious freedom ==
President Duarte and some of his supporters promoted intolerance toward the Catholic Church during the 2007-2008 presidential election campaign. In 2007 then-President Duarte made several discriminatory remarks against the Catholic clergy in an attempt to discredit candidate Fernando Lugo, a resigned Catholic bishop, who won the election.

Jehovah's Witnesses who refused to give permission for blood transfusions reported that authorities challenged their "right to bodily self-determination." In January 2007 police in Horqueta, Concepción Department, arrested Jehovah's Witness Pastor Juan Gill and four members of his congregation for refusing to authorize a blood transfusion for Gill's son, Magno Gill Bazan. In June 2007 a court found them innocent. In September 2007 police arrested Jehovah's Witnesses José Ortega and Asunción Bernarda Ortega Gaona for refusing to allow doctors to give their daughter blood transfusions. Doctors at the hospital administered the blood transfusion after obtaining a court order. Ten days after their arrest, the Ortegas were released from prison on bail; their case remained under investigation at the end of the period covered by this report. In 2022 there were no reports of forced blood transfusions.

In May 2007 the Supreme Court ruled that the government's expropriation in 2005 of approximately 319,000 acres (1,290 km^{2}) of land in Puerto Casado owned by Reverend Sun Myung Moon's Unification Church was unconstitutional. In August 2007 the government and the Unification Church agreed to a donation of 74,130 acres (300.0 km^{2}) for distribution to local farmers. Thereafter, the Government granted the Church access to its remaining land holdings, and the Church remains active in the country.

There are no reports of religious prisoners or detainees in 2022.

== See also ==
- Religion in Paraguay
- Roman Catholicism in Paraguay
