= Acaray Dam =

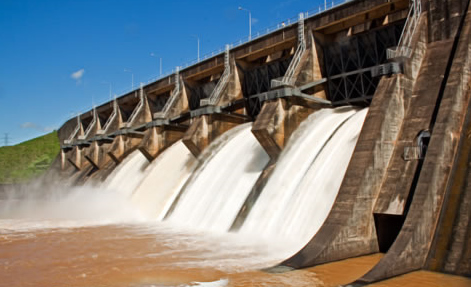
- Interactive map of Acaray Dam
- Location: Hernandarias, Paraguay
- Coordinates: 25°27′34″S 54°37′45″W
- Owner: Administracion Nacional de Electricidad

Dam and spillways
- Type of dam: Gravity dam
- Impounds: Acaray River
- Height: 185 m (607 ft)
- Length: 1,500 m (4,900 ft)
- Spillway type: 56 m^{3}/s (2,000 cu ft/s)

Power Station
- Installed capacity: 210 MW

The Acaray Dam is a hydroelectric dam situated in Hernandarias, Paraguay. It has an electrical output of 210 MW, supplying 3% of Paraguay's electricity demand.

== HVDC-back-to-back station ==
The power plant's switchyard has a HVDC back-to-back station built by Siemens in 1981. It has a power rating of 55 MW and an operating voltage of 25 kV. It converts the electrical frequency from 50 hertz to 60 hertz to supply electricity to Brazil's power grid, which operates at 60 Hz (Paraguay's power grid operates at a frequency of 50 hertz).

This back-to-back station is inoperative since 3 September 2007.

== Culture ==
It is depicted in the 50 guaranies coin in Paraguay.

== See also ==
- List of power stations in Paraguay
