= International rankings of Paraguay =

These are the international rankings of Paraguay.

== International rankings ==
Organization	Survey	Ranking
Institute for Economics and Peace	Global Peace Index	73 out of 144
United Nations Development Programme	Human Development Index	101 out of 182
Transparency International	Corruption Perceptions Index	154 out of 180
World Economic Forum	Global Competitiveness Report	124 out of 133
World Intellectual Property Organization	Global Innovation Index, 2026	109 out of 139
