= Paraguayan architecture =

Distinctive architectural style of Paraguay

The development of a distinct architectural style in Paraguay is relatively recent. This is due partially to the European influence following the colonization of the country in 1537. With the arrival of Europeans, and especially the Spanish, the architecture of the country developed with the construction of brick built cathedrals, palaces and many other European-style monuments.

== History ==
=== The legacy of colonialism 1537–1811 ===
Paraguay used to be a Spanish colony. Conquistadors were searching for gold, silver and other minerals in South America. The Spanish founded Asunción as the capital of Paraguay. With European colonization, Paraguay remained relatively underdeveloped due to a lack of extensive mineral resources. As a consequence, distinctive architectural styles and buildings did not develop before the eighteenth century. Prior to this period, most of the monuments were made with wood, although the Spanish commenced the use of stone in building churches. This activity is regarded as the first European influence over South American architecture. In 1562, natives destroyed Buenos Aires, and the Spanish fled to Asunción. The city became the center of a large Spanish colonial province comprising part of Brazil, present-day Paraguay and northeastern Argentina: the Giant Province of the Indies. In 1603 Asunción was the seat of the First Synod of Asunción, which set guidelines for the evangelization of the natives in their lingua franca, Guarani.

In 1731, an uprising under José de Antequeray y Castro was one of the first rebellions against Spanish colonial rule. The uprising failed, but it was the first sign of the independent spirit that was growing among the criollos, mestizos and natives of Paraguay. The event influenced the independence of Paraguay, which then materialised in 1811. The secret reunions between the independence leaders to plan an ambush against the Spanish Governor in Paraguay, Bernardo de Velasco were held at the home of Juana María de Lara, in downtown Asunción. On the night of 14 and 15 May the rebels succeeded and were able to force governor Velasco to surrender. Today, Lara's home is known as Casa de la Independencia (House of the Independence) and serves as a museum and historical building

=== The Francista age 1813–40 ===
In 1814, after a short period of unstable government, José Gaspar Rodrígez de Francia became a temporary dictator. During 30 years, the progress of urban architecture was slow, particularly in the case of the capital, Asuncion. The return of the dictator created an infrastructure which allowed an active construction program. This gave to the capital a new architectural design. From the architectural point of view this was a stage of technological continuity and spatial traditions for the colony. The Francista Age produced only technological innovations, which change the bearing structures of wood and masonry pillars bearing walls. The period closed with an almost total absence of public works. Among the few examples of works of the period is the council of the city of Pilar.

=== The reign of Carlos A. López 1844–62 ===
As part of its comprehensive project for the country, the president Carlos A. López started a policy of major public works, starting with the reconstruction of the city of Asuncion. This covered a number of new issues hither to unknown in the country, including the state building of schools, government offices, railway stations, docks, and arsenals. The public work of Carlos A. López, plentiful and of excellent quality, became iconic of a national project and his time. Specifically in the case of the architecture, the reign of Carlos López started the gradual imposition of a new cultural pattern that left behind colonial tradition : a pattern that would characterized as a transition towards classicism, understood as a sign of modernity, preserving certain values themselves as part of the national consciousness which was also part of the project country, as a paradigm of modernity.

From the technological point of view, this period completely left behind the wooden colonial structure, supporting and working predominantly with masonry bearing walls. This removed the "lance" structural-spatial module in use in the colony, corresponding to the maximum length of a wooden beam. It saw the introduction of new building materials, including iron, present in the spiral staircase of the president's house in Trinidad, and in the unusual glazed metal stairs of the Cabildo.

=== The Liberal period 1870–1936 ===
The architectural liberal period comes from the reconstruction of the country after the First World War, which brought a lot of European architects to Paraguay, including Italians such as Grassi, Rapetti and Pozzi. This influence of European architects resulted in a new architectural style for Paraguay and the other countries of South America. Cities like Asuncion received a new architecture which brought an improvement in the design quality and visual appeal of urban buildings. There was an approach to mix nature and architecture. This changed the approaches not just to houses and streets, but also for hospitals, churches and institutional buildings. At the beginning of the 20th century neo-colonialist architectural style appeared, such as in the church of San Roque Gonzalez.

=== Contemporary architecture 1936–2010 ===
Due to an arrival of the first professional Paraguayan architects, the urban landscape started to change. A new modern influence became visible, while still retaining a concern for the natural environment. An Art Deco style combined with an idea of green cities started to appear. Attempts were made to create a new harmony between high buildings such as villas, and the surrounding nature. Important public buildings were constructed, such as the building of IPS Herrera streets and Constitution, the building of the Ministry of Public Works and Communications, and the headquarters of the Governing Board of the NRA. Another strong influence in Paraguay comes from Brazil. The modern movement is really strong there and Brazilian architectural buildings began to be built in Paraguay. In the 1970s a radical change appeared, due to the economic « boom » produced by Itaipu. This event helped to stimulate the growth of the entrepreneurial bourgeoisie, which created a demand for a new urban residential neighborhood. The 1980s witnessed a process of degradation of the historical center and everything « old » but also a discrediting of the modern influence due to different and new expectations of the growing bourgeoisie. Since the late 1990s this aspect changed. Nowadays there is more of an appreciation of both the old and the modern architecture. Some modern heritage tends to be forgotten or abandoned.

== Architects ==
Francisco Wisner: He was born in Budapest in 1804 and he died in Asunción in 1879. He met Francisco Solano López who invited him to Paraguay, and convinced him to build the Lopez Palace which is nowadays the center of the government of Paraguay.

Carlos Colombino: He has been one of the few well-known Paraguayan architects. He was born in 1937 and died 14 May 2013. His specialty was painting. His contribution was essential for the renovation of some important cultural monuments.

Pascual Urdapilleta: He was born in Vizcaya, Spain at the end of the 18th century. He was an architect, and military Vasc of artillery. He died on 3 November 1852 in Asuncion. His body rests in La Recoleta Cemetery. An avenue in the capital, called Urdapilleta, was named after him. He designed the Cathedral of Asuncion and the restructuring of the Cabildo de Asuncion, which has become the cultural center of the Paraguayan Republic.

== Monuments ==
Downtown Gardens

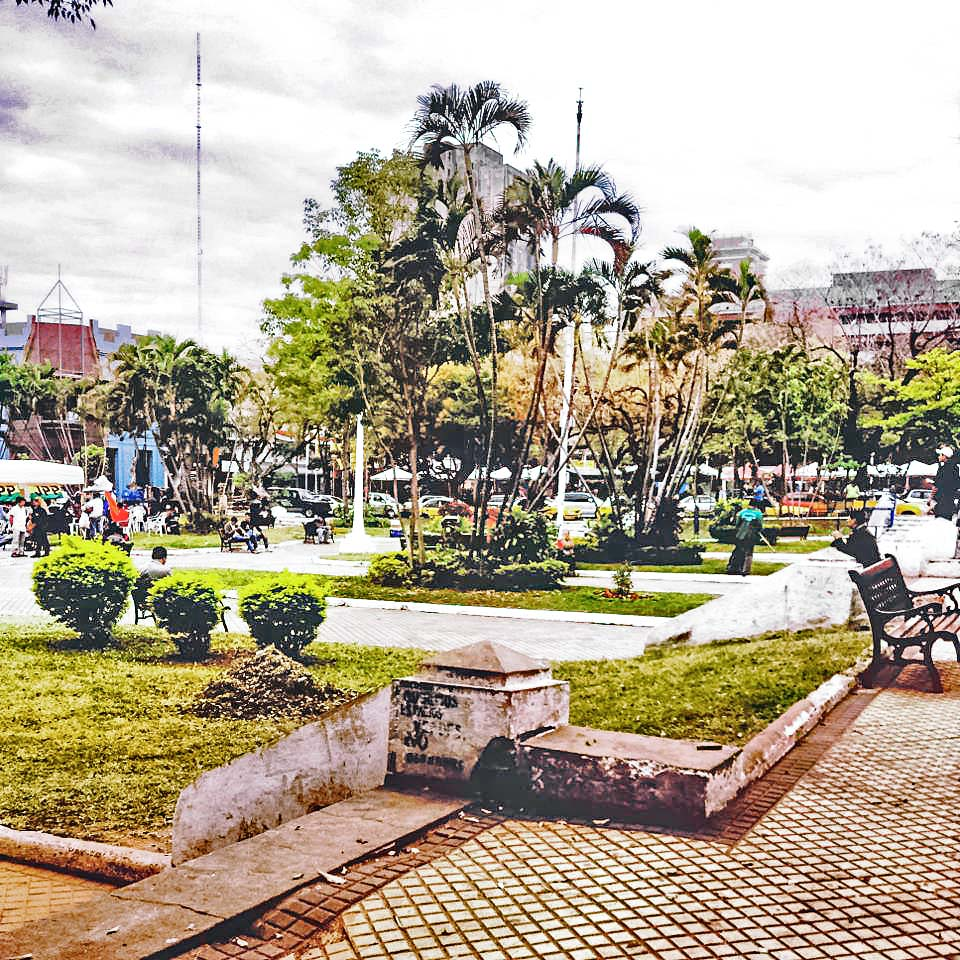
Garden of downtown

The garden of Asuncion is in the center of the city. It is the reflect of the new idea of a green city with old architecture. It is one of the most popular in Paraguay.

Asunción Governor's Palace

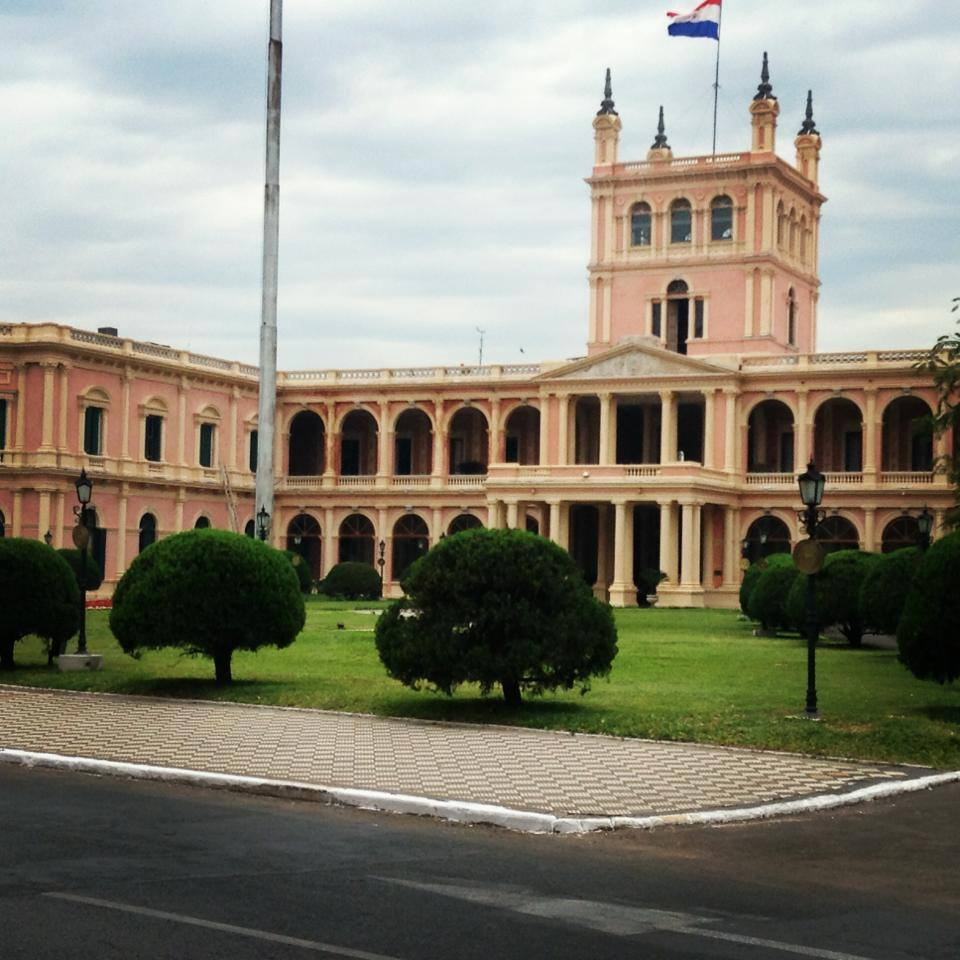
Asunción Governor's Palace

It is a palace in Asuncion, Paraguay, that serves as the workplace for the President of Paraguay, and is also the seat of the government of Paraguay. Located in the center of Asunción, looking at the bay, this building was built by order of Carlos Antonio Lopez, to serve as the residence for his son, the General Francisco Solano López. Construction began in 1857 under the direction of the English architect Alonso Taylor. The materials for the construction of the palace came from several places inside the country, stones from the quarries of Emboscada and Altos, woods and odrajes of Ñeembucú and Yaguarón, bricks of Tacumbú, iron pieces molten in Ybycuí, etc.

Asuncion's cathedral

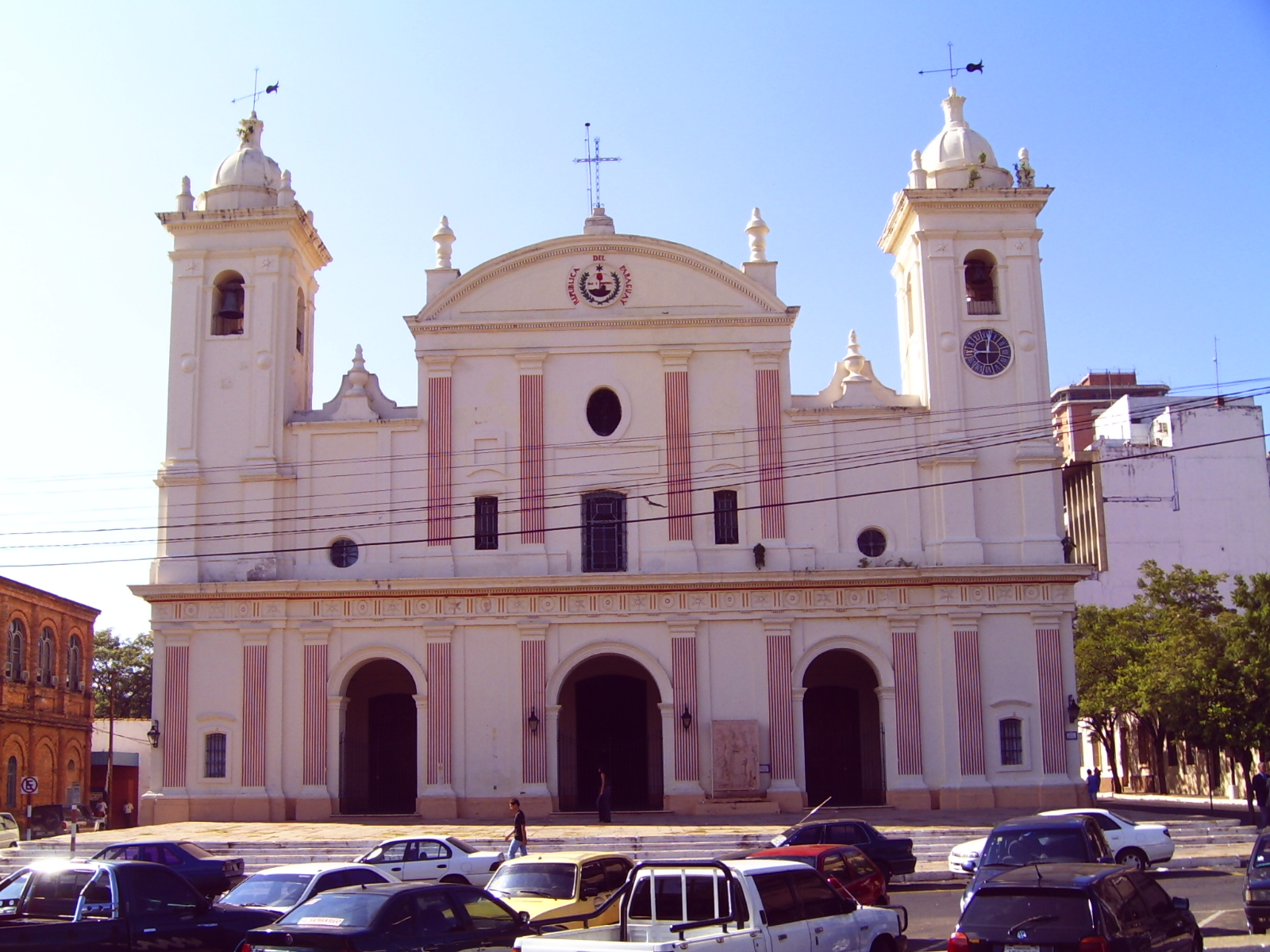
Asunción's cathedral

This cathedral has known many architectural changes after a fire in 1543 in Asuncion. Nowadays this cathedral is the center of a neighborhood in the capital.
