= Environmental issues in Paraguay =

Environmental issues in Paraguay include deforestation.

Between 1990 and 2000, Paraguay had an average deforestation rate of 1%. The rate increased between 2000 and 2005 to 1.92%. Paraguay also has a growing pollution problem. Many of the country's rivers suffer from toxic dumping. Tanneries are particularly harmful, releasing mercury and chromium into rivers and streams. Runoff from toxic chemicals used by farmers also seeps into Paraguay's waters. In the Chaco, the salination of already arid land makes farming even more difficult. Furthermore, Paraguay had a 2018 Forest Landscape Integrity Index mean score of 6.39/10, ranking it 74th globally out of 172 countries.

== See also ==
- Deforestation in Paraguay
