= Mass media in Paraguay =

Mass media in Paraguay consists of newspapers, television and radio, and the Internet has emerged as a significant form of communication since 1997. The History of Paraguay's mass media is associated with its political developments. Paraguay's media landscape is dominated by seven companies, so it is highly concentrated. Radio is the most crucial medium for accessing information. By February 2025, Paraguay has approximately 5.78 million Internet users. Facebook is the most visited social media platform in 2024. Paraguay ranked 84th out of 180 countries and territories all over the world in the 2025 World Press Freedom Index. The media has engaged in the electoral process since 1990, and political parties have used radio, television and social media to promote their propaganda.

== Overview ==
The seven main media companies in the media industry are Zuccolillo, Vierci, Domínguez Dibb, Wasmosy, Chena, Ángel González, and Rubín. They dominate the traditional media and own the majority of radio stations, newspapers and TV channels, hence, Paraguay's media landscape is considered highly concentrated. Radio is the most important medium for accessing news. The major Paraguayan radio stations are state-owned Radio Nacional del Paraguay and privately owned Radio Cardinal, Radio Nanduti, Radio Venus, and Radio Canal 100, the latter two are Asunción FM stations. In terms of Television, Paraguay TV HD is state-owned, and other main television networks are privately owned, such as NPY (Noticias Paraguay), RPC (Canal 13), Sistema Nacional de Television (Canal 9) and Telefuturo (Canal 4). The major Paraguayan news outlets include three private dailies, ABC Color, La Nacion and Ultima Hora.

== Newspaper ==
The History of Paraguay's mass media is intertwined with its political developments. It is influenced by its long history of strongman and one-party rule, geographic isolation, and population losses during wars with neighbouring countries, Argentina, Brazil, and Bolivia. In around 1700, Paraguay was the first country to have a printing press in South America, which was used for religious printing only. During the period of defense of independence from Spain in 1811, the state monopolised the mechanisms to disseminate information, no media and voices could challenge the rule of independence leader José Gaspar Rodríguez de Francia (1814–1840).

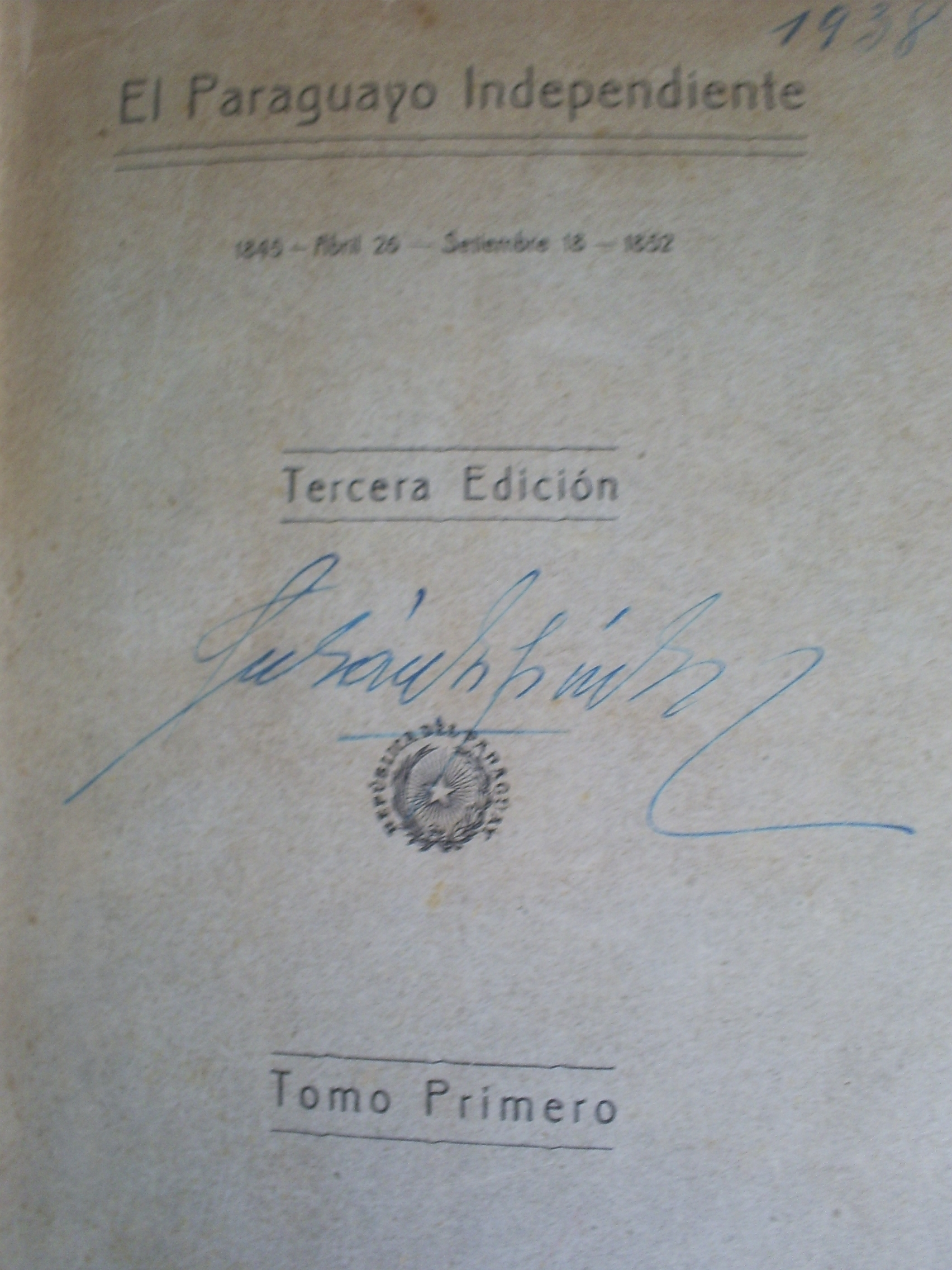
El Paraguayo Independiente cover

However, Paraguay was the last South American country to found a newspaper. During the first Paraguayan Republic (1811–1870), the nation's first newspaper, the weekly El Paraguayo Independiente, was produced by the state on 26 April 1845, the president Carlos Antonio López (1844–1862) was editor. This event marked the country's Journalist Day and the development of journalism. Several other newspapers emerged in the following years, and they were used by the government for political propaganda.

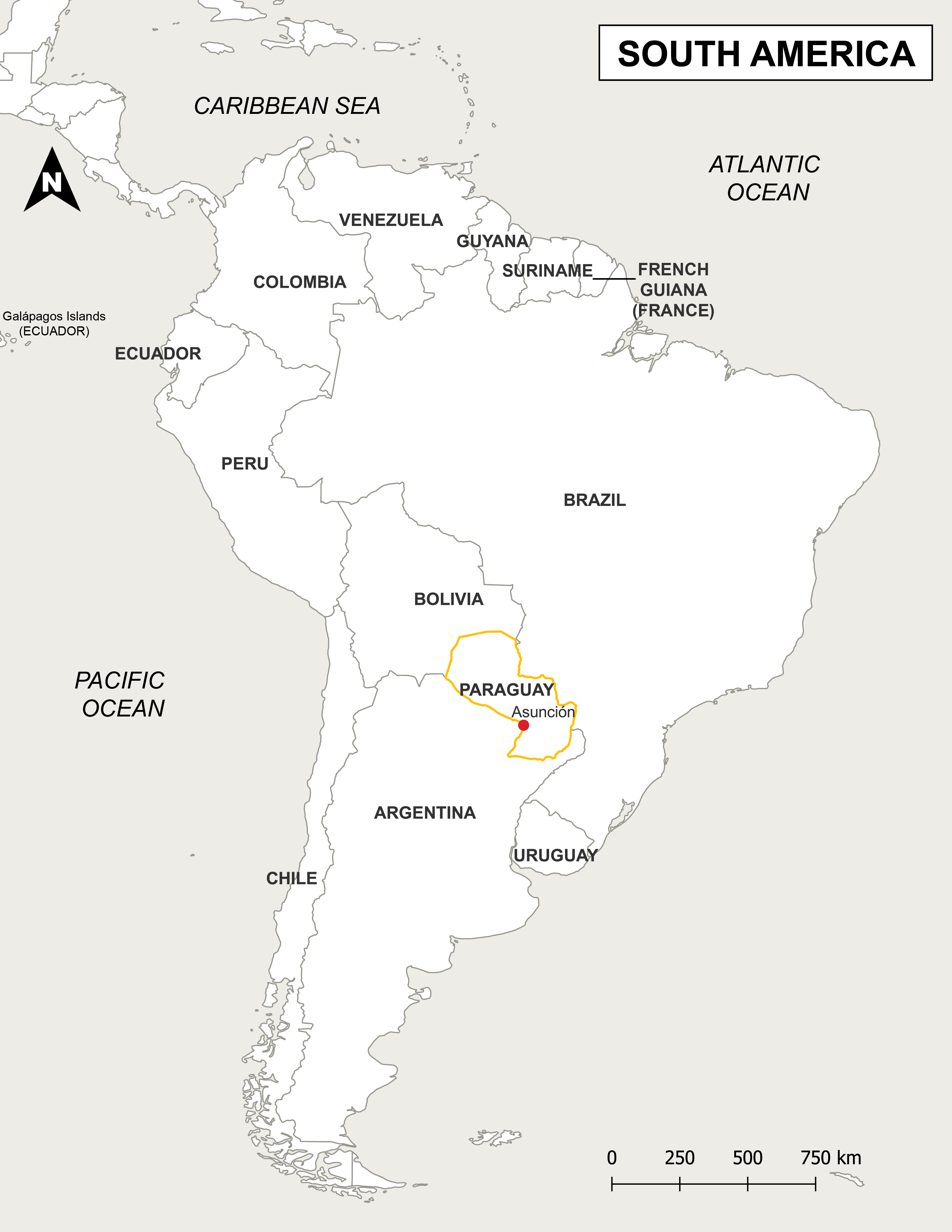
South America map, Paraguay highlighted

After the war against a unified Argentine-Brazilian-Uruguayan force (War of the Triple Alliance) from 1864 to 1870, more than half of the population had died, many Paraguayan newspapers were closed, and local news outlets disappeared; publishers from Argentina and Brazil started circulating their newspapers in Paraguay.

The Liberal Constitution of 1870 allowed the media in Paraguay to rebuild free and unrestricted journalism, although the War of the Triple Alliance still had an impact on it. The postwar period marked the beginning of the Second Paraguayan Republic (1869–1906), and new political parties and newspapers were established by the same individuals, such as José Segundo Decoud, who was the founder and editor of La Reforma, and played an important role in formation of the Partido Colorado (Colorado Party) in 1887.

By the late 19th and early 20th centuries, more newspapers such as El Artesano (October 25, 1885), El Despertar (May 1, 1906), and Bandera Roja (November 1924) included the emerging working class and labour unions. Voz del Siglo was a newspaper with feminist political ideas led by Ramona Ferreira in 1902, its creation proved a diverse perspective in news media.

Map of Chaco War between Bolivia and Paraguay

During the Chaco War with Bolivia (1932–1935), journalists from privately owned press boosted nationalism and the defense of national traditions and undermined the reputation of the Bolivian forces.

In 1941, President Higinio Morínigo (1940–1948) established the National Department for Press and Propaganda to centralise and regulate movies, literature, media, sports and propaganda. Higinio Morínigo arranged journalists loyal to his regime in major media organisations, hence making the public life views presented by newspapers in the 1940s tend to be consistent. The news media were forbidden to circulate information outside the official sphere by the Press Law, which was also called the Gag Law.

However, the Civil War of 1946-47 brought a violent crackdown on the press; the Colorado Party won the Civil War and implemented a strong censorship system on journalism. Under the dictatorship of General Alfredo Stroessner (1954–1989), the government used the media as a tool for propaganda and control; independent journalism was nearly impossible, and self-censorship was common among journalists. For example, Stroessner's government introduced the production of an official newsreel, which seemed to show what the government had done, but Stroessner was the only focus. Stroessner's regime used government-run media to monitor and control members of his government.

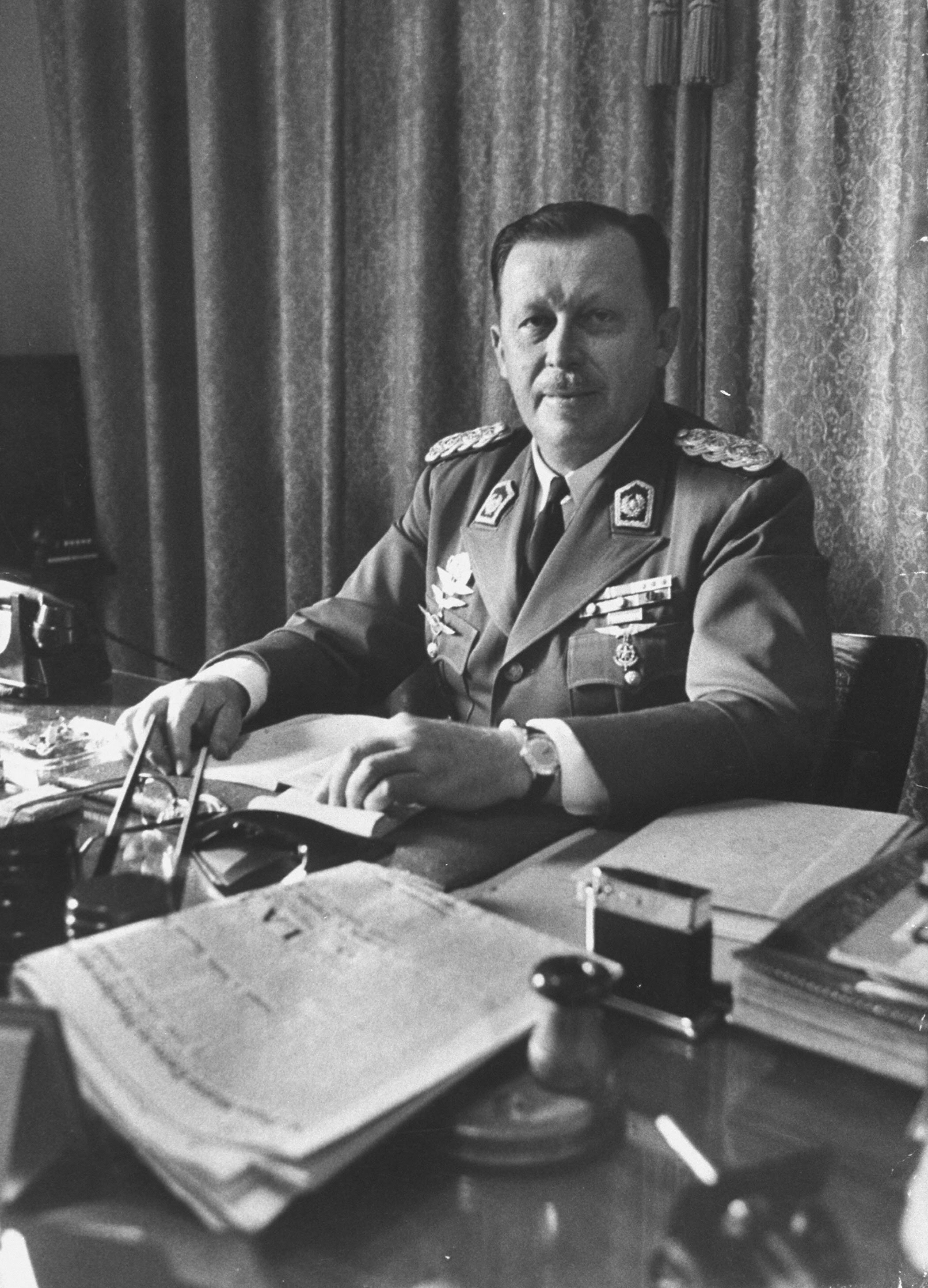
Alfredo Stroessner Matiauda (November 3, 1912–August 16, 2006) was President of Paraguay from August 15, 1954, to February 3, 1989.

In 1967, ABC Color newspaper was established and marked a new era of Paraguay's media, and it was considered the independent voice of the country. Publisher and businessman Aldo Zuccolillo brought new technology and enhanced reporters’ technical professionalism, but ABC Color newspaper was shut down in 1984 by Stroessner, due to ABC Color's critiques towards the dictator (reopened five years later). Another newspaper El Diario was then established by Stroessner's friend, Nicolas Bo.

In 2000, there were only 4.3 printed newspapers per 100 people in Paraguay. In the capital city of Paraguay, Asunción, serves as the primary market for six newspapers, including ABC Color, Crónica (Report), La Nación (The Nation), El Diario Popular (The Popular Daily), Última Hora (Last Hour) and Noticias (News).

ABC Color is owned by the Zuccolillo family, it is the most influential media entity in Paraguay, and it plays a crucial role in influencing politics and public discourse as it makes the newspaper a ubiquitous source of political information within the nation. This media outlet was closed by Stroessner in 1984 and reopened in 1989 after Stroessner fell. ABC Color newspaper had a weekly circulation of 45,000, while Ultima Hora followed with approximately 35,000 copies, and Noticias distributed around 30,000 copies on a daily basis. However, the number of newspaper readers is limited because they do not read Spanish, 60 per cent of the population can only speak Guarani which is an Aboriginal language, and the rate of newspaper per capita in Paraguay is lower than any other country in South America, there are only six different newspaper available for a population of almost seven million people.

Paraguay's Journalism education began in 1893 with the Facultad de Notarios y Escribanos Públicos, which served as the nearest form of journalism training until the early 1930s when dedicated journalism programs were officially introduced. However, even today, Paraguayan journalism schools are not particularly valued in the country among journalists and professors.

== Television ==
In Stroessner's era, when ABC Color newspaper was closed, the government controlled two Television channels, Channel 9 (Canal 9) which was owned by Stroessner's relatives, and Channel 13 (Canal 13) which was owned by a private firm regulated by the government. The establishment of Channel 9 in 1965 marked the first broadcast of television in Paraguay.

After the overthrow of the Stroessner regime in 1989, Paraguay's journalism had more freedom, but media diversity was still limited. Channel 9 was owned by the new president General Andrés Rodríguez’s daughter and son-in-law, the name was changed to National Television System.

In April 2008, the Colorado Party's 61-year rule came to an end, and former Catholic bishop Fernando Lugo Msamdes became the president, who tried to create a more diverse media system. For example, Lugo replaced the Secretariate of Social Communication with the Secretariate of Information and Communication for Development, which was made up of Education and Communication for Development, Strategic Communication, Presidential Information, and State Media.

Television is Paraguay's most popular medium, data shows that as of 2005, around 76 out of 100 households have at least one television.

In 2021, TV Pública was established, and Reporters Without Borders (RSF) claimed its style showed greater social inclusiveness.

== Radio ==
Paraguay used radio as a key tool for state-building, particularly during the Chaco War with Bolivia, the military created a radio network to broadcast their daily activities in Guarani to the whole country. Throughout the 1930s and 1940s, Paraguay made a great effort to develop radio broadcasting in order to construct an integrated country and promote Guarani. As a result, Paraguay has been considered the only Latin American country to have more radio broadcasting in Indian languages (Ayoreo and Guarani) than in Spanish.

During Stroessner's tenure, under his strict control over the media, live radio was increasingly difficult, requiring local authorities to justify their actions to the public. Radio Ñanduti, established in 1962 by journalist, broadcaster, and owner Humberto Rubín as a family-run station, faced opposition from the National Telecommunications Administration, which disrupted the station's transmissions from 1978 until its closure in 1987. Radio Ñandutí, which was targeted by Stroessner, was closed for a month in 1983 for “systematically disturbing the public peace” and “creating social chaos”.

Until 2009, Paraguay had approximately 200 radio stations that were managed by the Asociación Paraguaya de Radiodifusión (APRAP: Paraguayan Association of Radio Broadcasting) and the Administración Nacional de Telecomunicaciones (ANTEL: National Management of Telecommunications). Paraguayan people could local news and Latin music via radio stations, including Canal 100 (Channel 100), Radio Cardinal, Radio Conquistador, and Holding Radio; while Radio Nacional de Paraguay (National Radio of Paraguay) was the only public radio station for the government's propaganda.

== Internet ==
Paraguayan people gained Internet access in 1997, but to this day, approximately one in ten people can use it. Only the highly educated Paraguayans are likely to have access to the Internet. Paraguay has a lower number of Internet users and a lower Internet penetration rate than other Latin American countries. In 2007, out of 100 Paraguayan people, there were only 4.1 Internet users, 0.3 broadband subscribers and 70.7 mobile cellular subscribers.

Paraguayan people use social media as a platform to complain, express preferences and influence public decisions and policies. As of 2017, almost one million Paraguayan people use X (formerly Twitter), most of whom are younger generations aged 18 to 25 years old. Some social media users in Paraguay discuss and engage in political events such as the 2017/2018 presidential elections on X, Facebook and WhatsApp.

Among social media platforms, Facebook alone represented 81.14 per cent of mobile social media site visits in Paraguay in August 2024. According to data from Statista, as of February 2025, Paraguay had approximately 5.78 million Internet users. It was estimated that the number of households with internet access in Paraguay would rise by 0.3 million between 2024 and 2029. The number of Paraguayan people with Internet access was expected to increase by 16.9 per cent between 2024 and 2029, and to reach 97.71 per cent in 2029.

== Media Freedom ==
During the dictatorship of Stroessner, the presence of media companies associated with opposition parties was not allowed; opposition media practitioners faced persecution, imprisonment, assassination, or were forced into exile.

The 1992 Paraguayan Constitution plays an important role in safeguarding freedom of expression and press freedom, and access to public information. The governments are forbidden to shut down media companies that hold opposite opinions to the party and the policies.

Horacio Cartes won the presidential election in 2013, he was accused of discriminating against community media because the government prevented them from gaining licenses, but media organisations controlled by pro-government politicians were legalised on a large scale. Journalists who reported on demonstrations protesting Cartes were seen as threatening to his presidency and ambition for re-election, and they were intimidated and suppressed; some reporters were even killed.

In 2018, with Mario Abdo Benítez’s successful election as president, the Colorado Party continued to control Paraguay’s democracy as well as the media and communication. This government developed the Ministry of Technology and Communication to oversee the government communication, public service media and public advertising.

Like Argentina, Brazil, Costa Rica, Peru and many other Latin American countries, Paraguay offers reporters’ sources protection. As of 2003, Paraguay was one of the members that had either enacted laws pending implementation or were reviewing proposed transparency legislation.

The latest report on Paraguay's freedom was published by Freedom House in 2024. The report stated that Paraguay scored two points out of a total of four regarding the question, “Are there free and independent media?”. It explained that the biggest media organisations were owned by three companies: Zuccolillo Group, Vierci Group, and Cartes Group, which was too concentrated; so the protection of freedom of expression and the press was inconsistent and uneven. For instance, news covering corruption was censored, and the journalists were often sued, threatened and killed.

According to RSF, Paraguay ranked 84th out of 180 countries and territories all over the world in the 2025 World Press Freedom Index. The 2024 Paraguay Country Report published by the BTI claims that both private and state media are pluralistic. The mass media are still affected by ownership concentration and political parties.

== Media and Electoral Process ==
During the Stroessner years, the mass media were not seen as a propagandistic tool in the electoral process, nor mentioned in the electoral law, Estatuto Electoral. Paraguayans received a large amount of information about propaganda when they consumed media through the National Radio Network, the Noticiero Nacional in movie theatres, and the Colorado Party's broadcasting network.

In 1990, the media broke into the electoral process, as a new electoral law allowed parties and political activists to engage with the media to convey their propaganda messages to the public. The new code was reviewed and modified in 1995, but the fundamental principles established in 1990 were retained. Election media campaigning mainly focused on radio and television, the public would receive either paid campaigning funded by political parties or free advertisements distributed by the Supreme Electoral Court.

After the Internet was introduced in Paraguay, the presence of television and multimedia in election campaigning increased, as it was combined with traditional media. For example, two candidates in the 2000 Vice presidential election established personal home pages on the Internet.
