= Petróleos Paraguayos =

National oil company of Paraguay

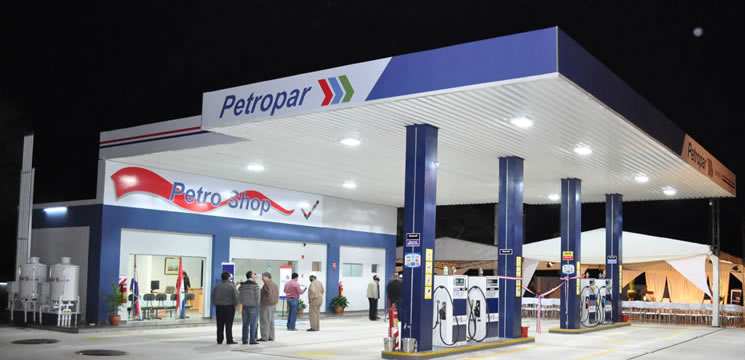
- Company type: state owned
- Industry: oil
- Founded: 1981
- Headquarters: Asunción, Paraguay
- Key people: Fleming Raúl Duarte Ramos, CEO
- Revenue: US$ 800 million (2008)
- Owner: Paraguayan Government
- Number of employees: 2,700 (2008)

Paraguayan Petroleums (Spanish: Petróleos Paraguayos or Petropar) is the Paraguayan national oil company that owns the only refinery in the country, Villa Elisa Refinery, which is located in Villa Elisa, and which has a capacity of 7,500 barrels (1,190 m^{3}), a LNG plant, a biodiesel plant and several storage facilities with a storage capacity of around 400,000 cubic metres (14,000,000 cu ft).
