= Religion in Paraguay =

Religion in Paraguay (Pew Research Center 2020)
1. Christianity (93.5%)
2. Unaffiliated (4.20%)
3. Other religions (2.30%)
Religion in Paraguay (2018 estimate)
1. Catholicism (88.3%)
2. Protestantism (6.80%)
3. Other Christian (0.90%)
4. No religion (2.60%)
5. Unanswered (0.80%)
6. Other (0.60%)

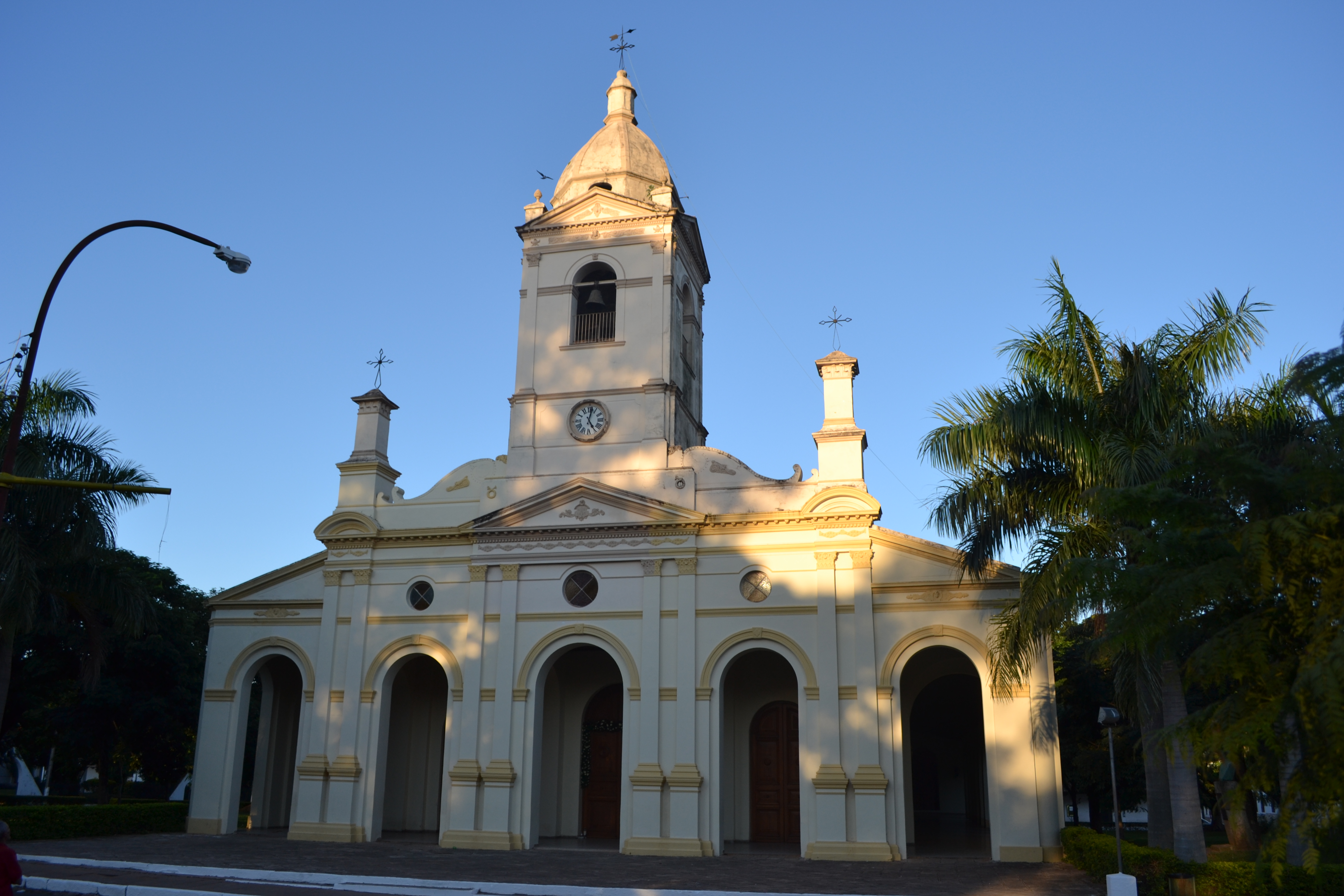
St. Claire's Cathedral in Villarrica.

Christianity is the predominant religion in Paraguay, with Catholicism being its largest denomination. Before the arrival of Spanish missionaries, the people residing in the territory of modern-day Paraguay practiced a variety of religions.

Paraguay is often classified as the most religious country in South America. However, the state is officially secular, and freedom of religion is guaranteed by its constitution.

== Current situation ==
According to article 27 of the Paraguayan Constitution of 1992, freedom of religion is recognised and there is no official religion. Relations between the State and the Catholic Church are to be based on independence, co-operation and autonomy. The independence of religious organisations is guaranteed.

As can be seen below, the majority of Paraguayans are Roman Catholic, although the percentage of Paraguayans who identify themselves as Catholic has dropped slightly. There has been a corresponding growth in the influence of Evangelical churches in recent years. There are a number of Indigenous religions and there are also Buddhist (probably due to immigration from Korea), Jewish and Muslim communities in the country.

In 2023, the country was scored 4 out of 4 for religious freedom.

== Religions in Paraguay according to 2002 and 1992 censuses ==
The 2002 census counted 5,163,198 people in Paraguay but the question about religion was meant only for those aged 10 or older, namely 3,892,603 persons.

Religions in Paraguay
Religion	Number of followers 2002	Percentage 2002	Number of followers 1992	Percentage 1992	Change 1992–2002
Catholicism	3,489,531	89.64%	2,749,888	93.24%	−3.60%
Indigenous & Catholic	223	0.01	N/A	N/A	N/A
Orthodox	25	<0.00%	N/A	N\A	N/A
Orthodox (Russian)	470	0.01%	N/A	N/A	N/A
Other Orthodox	950	0.02%	N/A	N/A	N/A
Anglicanism	1,858	0.05%	N/A	N/A	N/A
Indigenous & Anglican	29	<0.01%	N/A	N/A	N/A
Lutheran	8,849	0.23%	N/A	N/A	N/A
Presbyterian	276	0.01%	N/A	N/A	N/A
Mennonites	8,445	0.22%	N/A	N/A	N/A
Indigenous & Mennonite	8	<0.01%	N/A	N/A	N/A
Traditional Christianity* (excl. Catholicism)	21,133	0.54%	14,497	0.49%	+0.05%
Christian and Missionary Alliance	87	<0.01%	N/A	N/A	N/A
Assemblies of God	9,879	0.25%	N/A	N/A	N/A
Maranatha Baptist Church	10,355	0.27%	N/A	N/A	N/A
Centro familiar de adoración aposent.	513	0.01%	N/A	N/A	N/A
Comunidad Cristiana	1,046	0.03%	N/A	N/A	N/A
Plymouth Brethren – Open Brothers	665	0.02%	N/A	N/A	N/A
Independent	7	<0.01%	N/A	N/A	N/A
Church of God (Pentecostal)	1,550	0.04%	N/A	N/A	N/A
Church of God of Prophecy (Pentecostal)	149	<0.01%	N/A	N/A	N/A
Methodists	451	0.01%	N/A	N/A	N/A
Free Methodists	156	<0.01%	N/A	N/A	N/A
Church of the Nazarene	86	<0.01%	N/A	N/A	N/A
Neotestamentaria (Baptist)	276	0.01%	N/A	N/A	N/A
Pentecostal	8,631	0.22%	N/A	N/A	N/A
Other Evangelical	186,107	4.78%	N/A	N/A	N/A
Seventh Day Adventist	7,804	0.20%	N/A	N/A	N/A
Dios es Amor (Pentecostal)	1,290	0.03%	N/A	N/A	N/A
Universal Church of the Kingdom of God	714	0.02%	N/A	N/A	N/A
Unification Church	116	<0.01%	N/A	N/A	N/A
Church of Jesus Christ of Latter Day Saints (Mormons)	9,374	0.24%	N/A	N/A	N/A
Pueblo de Dios	12,114	0.31%	N/A	N/A	N/A
Jehovah's Witnesses	11,805	0.30%	N/A	N/A	N/A
Mount Zion Church	233	0.01%	N/A	N/A	N/A
Other pseudo-Christian groups	825	0.02%	N/A	N/A	N/A
Post-16th-Century Christian denominations**	264,233	6.79%	138,573	4.70%	+2.09%
Judaism	1,100	0.03%	952	0.03%	–
Islam	872	0.02%	1,200	0.04%	−0.02%
Hinduism (Tao)	151	<0.01%	N/A	N/A	N/A
Buddhism	2,088	0.05%	N/A	N/A	N/A
Reyukai	72	<0.01%	N/A	N/A	N/A
Shinto	30	<0.01%	N/A	N/A	N/A
Baháʼí Faith	225	0.01%	N/A	N/A	N/A
"Eastern and Cultural Religions" (excl Islam)***	2566	0.07%	2,811	0.10%	−0.03%
Rosacrucis	7	<0.01%	N/A	N/A	N/A
Spiritualists - E.C.Basilio	289	0.01%	N/A	N/A	N/A
Umbanda	54	<0.01%	N/A	N/A	N/A
Other, Spiritualist	66	<0.01%	N/A	N/A	N/A
Mentalism	164	<0.01%	N/A	N/A	N/A
Indigenous Religions	25,219	0.65	N/A	N/A	N/A
Religions not included above	1,208	0.03%	N/A	N/A	N/A
Unspecified other religion	6,139	0.16%	N/A	N/A	N/A
Religion not previously mentioned in 1992 Census****	31,668	0.81%	8,152	0.28%	+0.53%
No religion	44,334	1.14%	23,236	0.79%	+0.35%
No response	37,206	0.96%	9,790	0.33%	+0.63%
Total no. of participants	3,892,603	100%	2,949,099	100%	–

NB:

- Traditional Christianity taken to include Anglicanism, all branches of Orthodox Church, Lutheranism, Presbyterianism and the Mennonites – all branches that had emerged by the end of the 16th Century (except Catholicism)
  - Post 16th Century Christian denominations includes: Christian and Missionary Alliance, Assemblies of God, Maranatha Baptist Church, Centro familiar de adoración aposent., Comunidad Cristiana, Plymouth Brethren – Open Brothers, Independent, Church of God (Pentecostal), Church of God of Prophecy (Pentecostal), Methodism, Free Methodism, Church of the Nazarene, Neotestimentaria (Baptist), Pentecostal, Other Evangelical, Seventh Day Adventist, Dios es Amor (Pentecostal), Universal Church of the Kingdom of God, Unification Church, The Church of Jesus Christ of Latter-day Saints (Mormons), Pueblo de Dios, Jehovah's Witnesses, Mount Zion Church & Other pseudo-Christian groups
    - Eastern and Cultural Religions includes: Hinduism (Tao), Buddhism, Reyukai, Shinto & Baháʼí ****Religions not previously mentioned in the 1992 census include: Rosacrucis, Spiritualists - E.C.Basilio, Umbanda, Other, Spiritualist, Mentalism, Indigenous Religions, Religions not included above & Unspecified other religion

== Christianity ==
=== Roman Catholicism ===
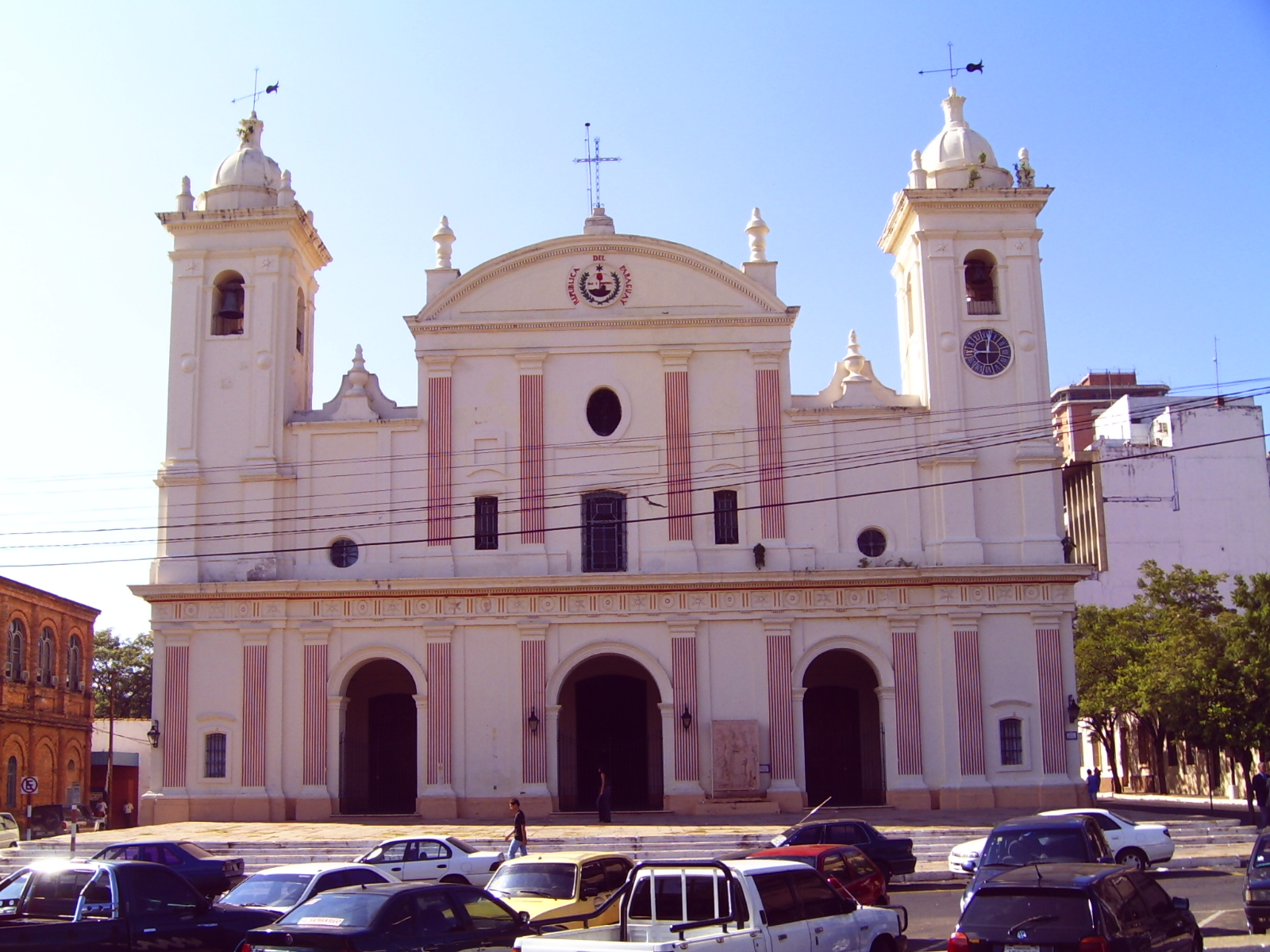
Metropolitan Cathedral of Our Lady of the Assumption in Asunción.

Catholicism has a played a major role in shaping Paraguay's culture. Catholicism has long been the most important religion in Paraguay, with the Bishopric of Asunción created in 1547. The majority of government officials are Catholics and a number of Catholic festivals are public holidays (Holy Thursday, Good Friday, Feast of The Assumption of the Virgin Mary [15 August], Feast of The Immaculate Conception [8 December] and Christmas).

Many people mark the Feast of the Immaculate Conception with a pilgrimage to Caacupé. The Basilica of Caccupe contains a statuette of Our Lady of the Miracles. Pope John Paul II visited Caacupe in 1987.

The Church maintains the Universidad Católica "Nuestra Señora de la Asunción".

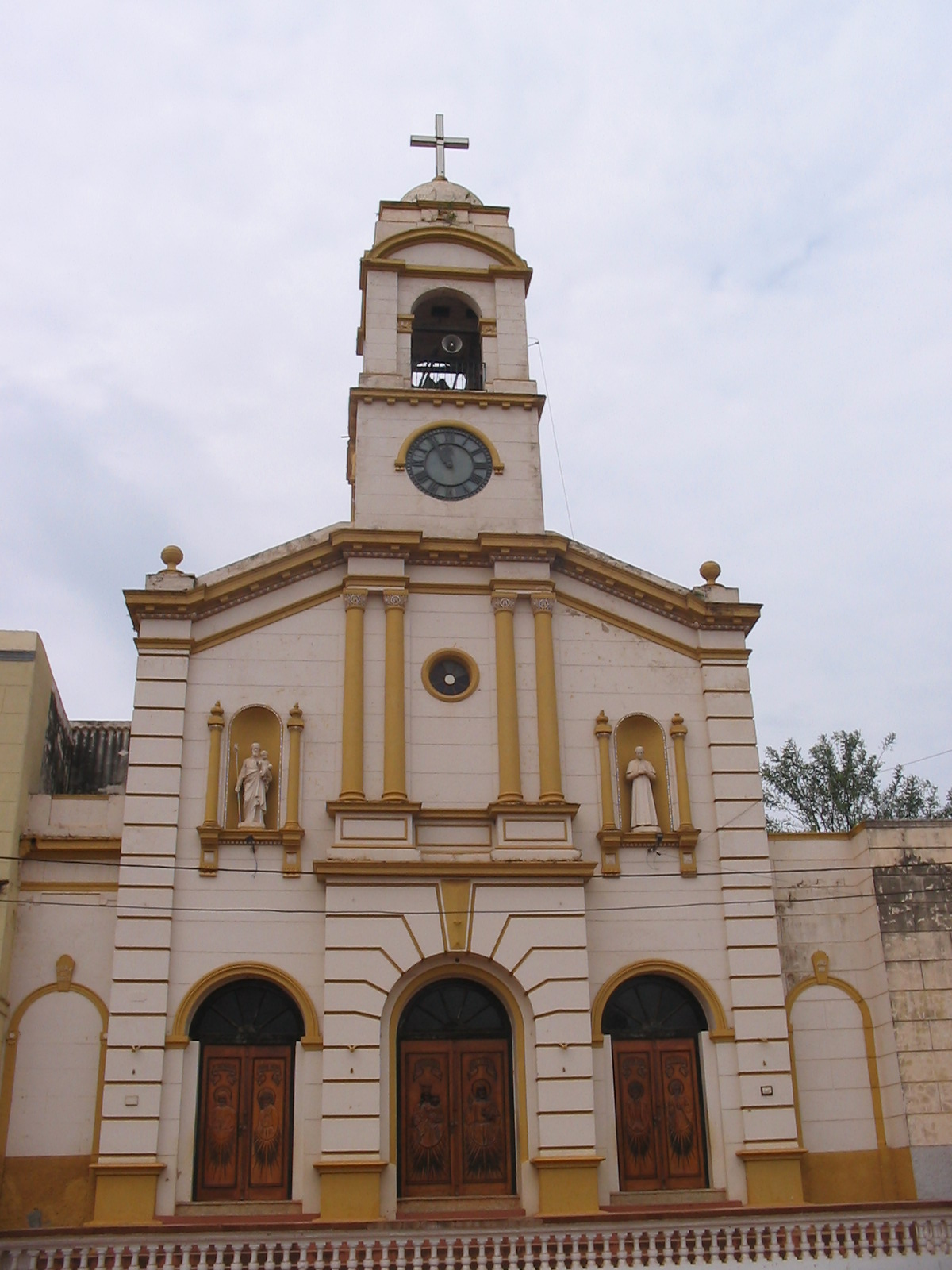
Catholic Chapel in Concepción. Christianity is the main religion in Paraguay.

=== Protestantism ===
The second largest religious affiliation in Paraguay is Protestantism, which like in North America shows a wide array of denominations. Lutherans and Mennonites are the more traditional groups which are dominated by rather recent immigrants of European ancestry and their descendants; in 2022, the Mennonite Church, estimated that they had 46,000 members. Evangelical and/or Charismatic churches have spread in recent decades mostly in the vast and long-established Mestizo population. The Bruderhof established a base in Paraguay in 1941, fleeing Nazi persecution. They left the country for North America in 1966, but returned and re-established themselves in 2010.

=== Latter Day Saints ===
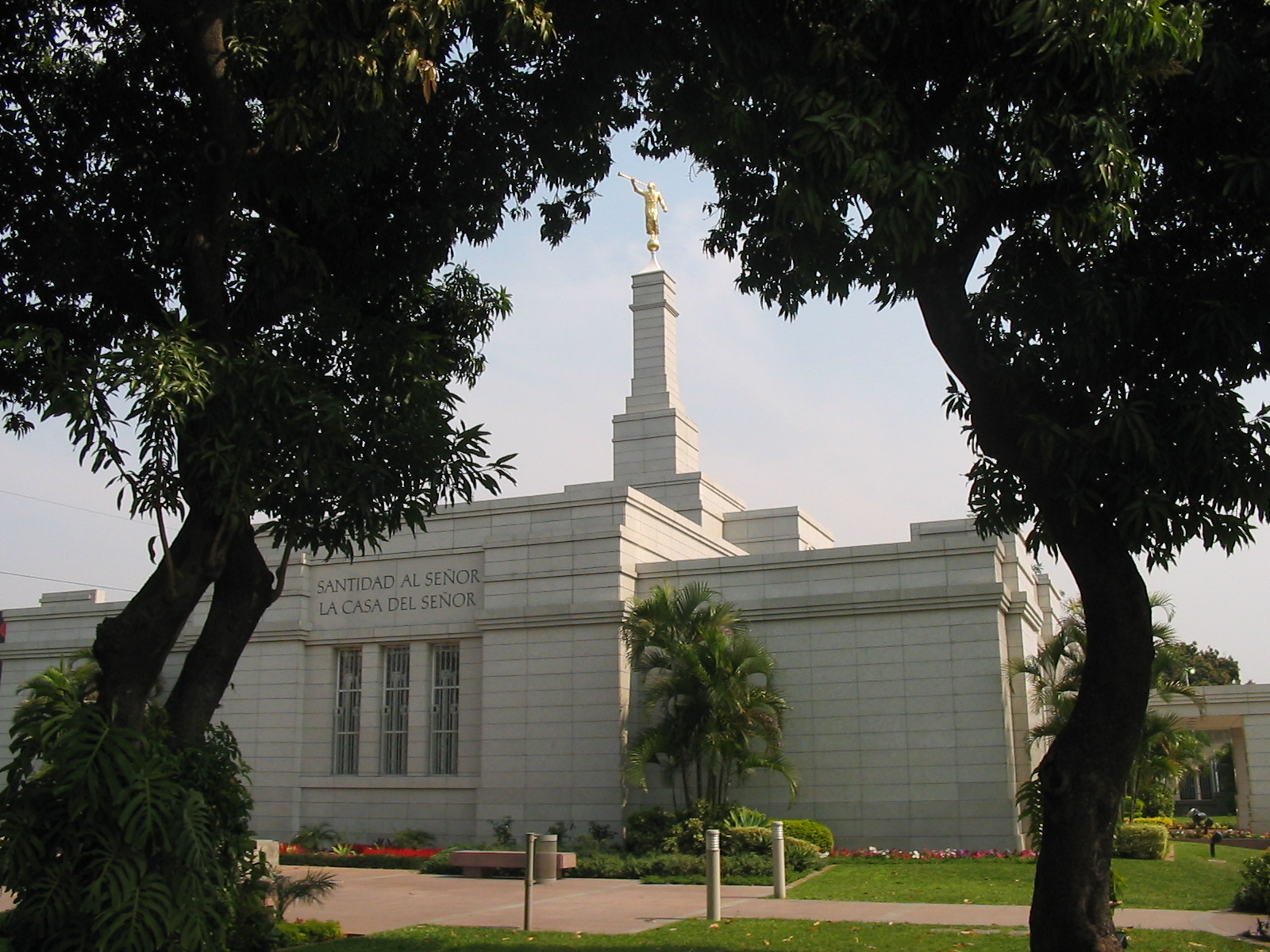
The Asunción Paraguay Temple (Mormon), opened in 2002

The Church of Jesus Christ of Latter-day Saints (LDS Church) had 9,374 adherents according to the 2002 census but more recently (2015) claims to have more than 86,000 members and 139 congregations in Paraguay.

=== Jehovah's Witnesses ===
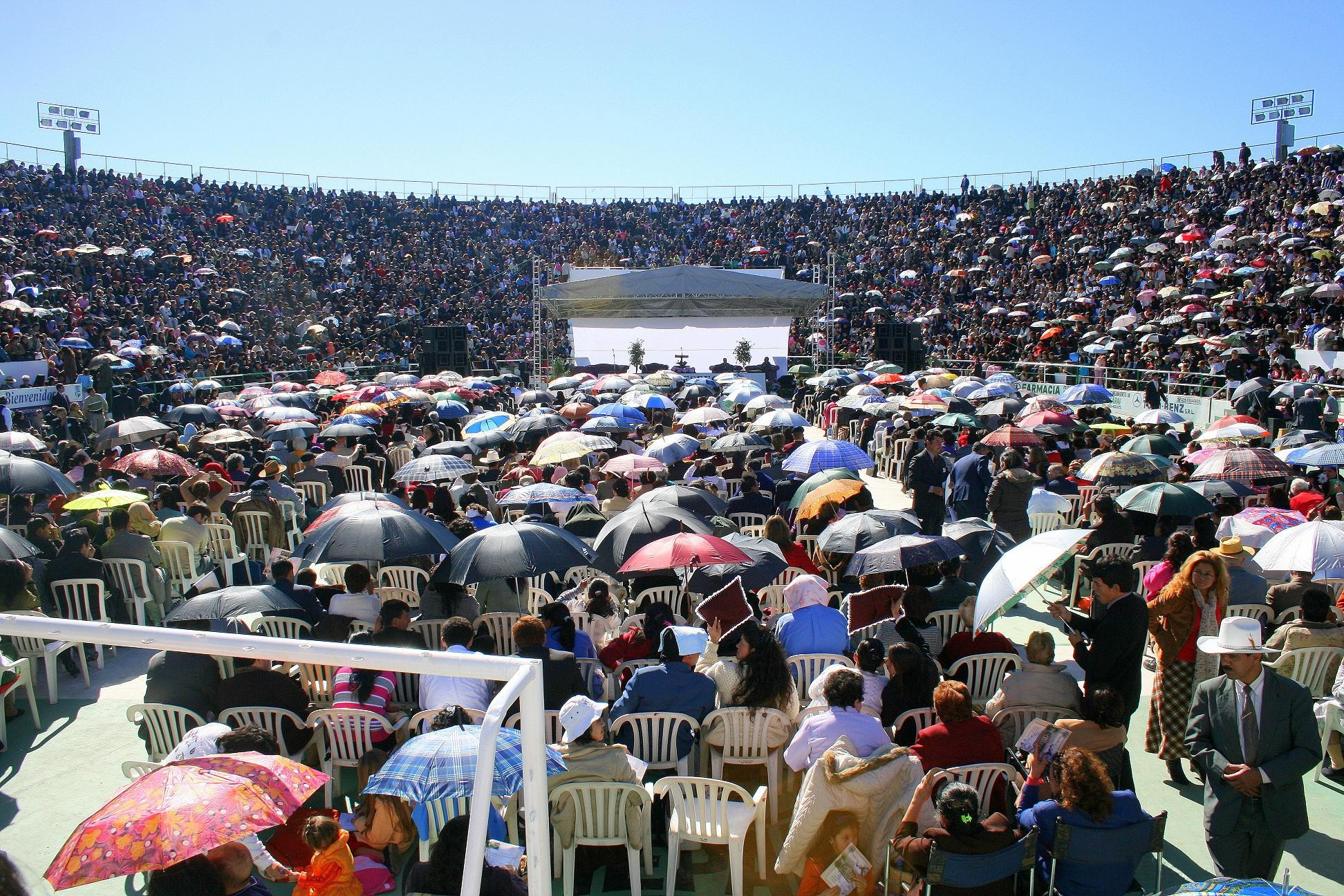
Jehovah's Witnesses in a convention on the Ypacaraí Stadium

The Jehovah's Witnesses history in Paraguay dates back to 1924 with an Argentinian missionary named Juan Muñiz. Through a government decree, dated January 3, 1979, the Government of Paraguay banned the work of Jehovah’s Witnesses in Paraguay. Legal recognition was approved on August 8, 1991. In 2020, the number of Jehovah's Witnesses was 11,051 active publishers, united in 226 congregations; 25,792 people attended annual celebration of Lord's Evening Meal in 2020.

== Buddhism ==
When Brazil decided to halt Japanese immigration in the 1930s, a Japanese land company built an agricultural settlement southeast of Asunción. Two more colonies near Encarnación followed in the 1950s; many Japanese settlers came from neighboring Bolivia. These immigrants brought Buddhism with them. Until the 1960s most retained their Buddhist faith, but since then many have converted to Christianity. In 2020, about 0.23% of the population were Buddhists.

== Judaism ==
The first synagogue in Paraguay was established in 1917 by Sephardic Jews who had emigrated from Palestine, Turkey and Greece; though there had previously been some isolated Jewish settlers from Europe.

Ashkenazi Jews from Ukraine and Poland founded the Unión Hebraica in the 1920s, while in the 1930s between 15,000 and 20,000 refugees from Germany, Austria and Czechoslovakia fled to Paraguay to escape the holocaust. Many of these later moved on to Argentina, Uruguay and Brazil. Those who remained were later joined by immigrants who were mostly survivors of the concentration camps.

Today, the Jewish community has around a 1000 members who live mainly in Asunción. There is a Jewish school Escuela Integral Estado de Israel. Asunción has three synagogues: Ashkenazi, Sephardi and Chabad and a Jewish museum.

== Islam ==
The 1992 census recorded 872 Muslims in Paraguay, 486 of which were in the Alto Paraná department, the capital of which is Ciudad del Este. There are also communities in Asunción and Itapúa (the capital of which is Encarnación). As in other parts of Latin America, many of these are descended from immigrants from Syria and Lebanon, though some may also be from Bangladesh and Pakistan.

== Baháʼí Faith ==
The Baháʼí Faith in Paraguay begins after `Abdu'l-Bahá, then head of the religion, mentioned the country in 1916. Paraguayan Maria Casati was the first to join the religion in 1939 when living in Buenos Aires. The first Baháʼí pioneer to settle in Paraguay was Elizabeth Cheney late in 1940 and the first Baháʼí Local Spiritual Assembly of Asunción was elected in 1944. By 1961 Paraguayan Baháʼís had elected the first National Spiritual Assembly and by 1963 there were 3 local assemblies plus other communities. Estimates of Baháʼís mention 5,500 (2001 report) or 10,600 (2010 report), though the state Census doesn't mention the Baháʼís.
