= La mañana de cada día =

Paraguayan morning news television show

- Genre: Morning show
- Presented by: Chiche Corte; Luchi García
- Country of origin: Paraguay
- Original languages: Spanish, Guarani
- No. of seasons: 34

Production
- Producer: Claudio Francois
- Production locations: Sajonia, Asunción
- Running time: 120 minutes

Original release
- Network: SNT
- Release: October 16, 1989 – present

La mañana de cada día (Spanish for 'the morning of every day') is a Paraguayan morning television show. It has been broadcast since October 16, 1989 on SNT. It is the longest running show on Paraguayan television.

== On-air staff ==
=== Current ===
- Chiche Corte (main host; 2020–present)
- Luchi García (main host; 2023–present)
- Edwin Storrer (sports commentator; 2019–present)
- Bruno Pont (sports commentator; 2020–present)
- Mariano López (commentator; 2023–present)

=== Former ===
- Yolanda Park (main host; 2002–2019)
- Carlos Troche (main host; 2002–2019)
- Mario Ferreiro (main host; 2002–2012)
- Gisella Cassettai (main host; 2020–2021)
- Paola Maltese (main host; 2022–2023)
- María Elsa Nuñez (commentator; 2013–2018)
- Aníbal Espínola (commentator; 2019–2023)
- Solange Encina (commentator, main host; (Note: Encina served as the main host for five days replacing Yolanda Park because she was on vacation.) 2018–2019)
- Amalia Cutillo (main host; (Note: Cutillo served as main host along with Solange Encina while Yolanda Park was on vacation.) 2019)

=== Details ===
In 2012, Mario Ferreiro left the channel to dedicate himself to his political career and was replaced by Carlos Troche.

August 31, 2018 was María Elsa Nuñez's last day on the show because she did not renew her contract, which expired that same day, as she wanted new things in her career.

On January 20, 2019, it was announced that Yolanda Park had submitted her resignation after the sports journalist of the same channel and her boyfriend Jorge "Chipi" Vera had been fired, due to the end of his contract and its non-renewal due to the absence of football commitments on the channels that year. Vera was not notified by management that he was no longer part of the SNT and Paravisión channels, therefore, Park met with the directors to make known her disagreement with the decision made. February 15, 2019 was Park's last day on the show after being on it since 2002. On December 24, 2019 it was reported that Gissella Cassettai would be joining the show in January 2020.

January 3, 2020 was Carlos Troche's last day on the show after he left it to focus on another journalistic show and was replaced by Chiche Corte.

On December 17, 2021, it was announced that Gisella Cassettai would be leaving the show to prioritize her motherhood and was replaced by Paola Maltese effective January 3, 2022.

On June 13, 2023, it was reported that Maltese resigned from the show to be the host of the fourth season of MasterChef Paraguay and was replaced by Luchi García. August 1, 2023 was the last day of Aníbal Espínola, who left the show to make way for another television project and was replaced by Mariano López.
