= ABC Television =

ABC Television most commonly refers to:

- ABC Television Network of the American Broadcasting Company, US, or
- ABC Television (Australian network), a division of the Australian Broadcasting Corporation, Australia

ABC Television or ABC television may also refer to:

== Australian TV stations ==
- ABC TV (Australian TV channel), the flagship TV station of the ABC television network of the Australian Broadcasting Corporation
- ABC Canberra (TV station), Australian capital city channel of the ABC
- ABC Australia (Asia-Pacific TV channel), an international pay TV channel

== Other countries ==
- ABC Television (Japan), Japan
- ABC Weekend TV (1956–1968), UK
- ABC Television (Nepal), a 2008 Nepali television channel
- ABC Development Corporation, former name of the TV5 Network, Philippines
- Associated Broadcasting Company, the original name of Associated Television (ATV), UK
- ABC Television-Africa, a former TV station in Sierra Leone
- ABC-TV (Paraguayan TV channel), since 2017

== See also ==
- ABC News (disambiguation)
- ABC1 (disambiguation)
- ABC-TV (disambiguation)
