= ABC-TV =

ABC-TV may refer to:

- American Broadcasting Company, a radio and television network in the US
- ABC Television (Australian TV network)
  - ABC Canberra (TV station), the ABC television station in Canberra
  - ABC TV (Australian TV channel), the Australian television channel, formerly known as ABC1
  - ABC TV Plus, the Australian digital television channel
  - ABC Australia (Southeast Asian TV channel), the former Australia Network / Australia Plus
- ABC Weekend TV, a former ITV company in the UK
- Asahi Broadcasting Corporation, a radio and television broadcaster in Osaka, Japan
- Associated Broadcasting Company:
  - A former name of TV5 Network, a radio and television network in the Philippines
  - A former name of Associated Television (ATV), a former ITV company in the UK
- ABC Television (Nepal), a television channel in Nepal
- ABC-TV (Paraguayan TV channel), a television channel in Paraguay

== See also ==
- ABC Television (disambiguation)
