= ABC-TV (Paraguayan TV channel) =

Paraguayan government digital TV channel

ABC TV
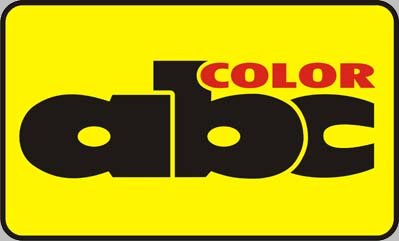
- Type: Subscription television
- Country: Paraguay
- Broadcast area: Paraguay, Latin America
- Headquarters: Yegros 745, Asunción Paraguay

Programming
- Languages: Spanish, Guaraní
- Picture format: 1080i HDTV

Ownership
- Owner: Grupo ABC Comunicaciones
- Key people: Natalia Zuccolillo

History
- Founded: 2017
- Launched: August 7, 2017; 8 years ago
- Founder: Editorial AZETA S.A.

Links
- Website: www.abc.com.py/tv

Availability

Terrestrial
- Cable television: (Paraguay); Channel 3 (Personal TV); Channel 10 and 23 (Claro TV); Channel 10 (Copaco IPTV); Channel 19 (Tigo Star) (Argentina); Channel 307 (Telecentro)

The ABC TV, or just ABC, is a television cable station network in the City of Asunción, capital of Paraguay. The content is based on local, regional and world news, culture, sports, music, variety and investigative journalism; available on cable and satellite in all Latin America. It is part of The Grupo ABC Comunicaciones along with the newspaper ABC Color, ABC Cardinal 730AM and ABC FM 98.5. The television studios are headquartered in the historic center of the city, on Yegros Street 745 & Herrera, with entrance to the TV Studios on Iturbe Street.

== History ==
It was launched in August 2017, in the midst of celebrations for the 50th anniversary of the newspaper ABC Color. To this day, it is one of the most watched news channels in Paraguayan cable and satellite due to the quality of the news, reports and investigations that are carried out, and it has reporters and journalists for its newspaper, radio and TV all across the country.

== Current programming ==
=== Monday to Friday ===
- Madrugada ABC
- La Primera Mañana
- ABC Noticias Primera
- A La Gran 730
- Cardinal Deportivo
- ABC Noticias Mediodía
- Ensiestados
- Factor Clave
- Crimen & Castigo
- ABC Noticias Central
- Peligro de Gol
- Mesa de Periodistas
- ABC Motor 360
- Enfoque Cooperativo
- Líderes

=== Saturdays ===
- Contacto Ciudadano
- No Tiene Nombre
- Enfoque Económico
- ABC Noticias Mediodía
- Cardinal Deportivo
- Poli Depo Rtivo
- Grandes Documentales
- Espacio de Tendencias
- Empresas & Empresarios TV
- ABC Rural
- Otro Level
- Pase Total
- Un mundo alucinante
- El Quincho del Rock

=== Sundays ===
- Entre Gallos y Medianoche
- ABC Rural
- Medalla Milagrosa - Mi cooperativa al día
- Empresas & Empresarios
- Música Viva
- El Quincho del Rock
- Grandes Documentales
- Espacios & Tendencias
- Pase Total
- Un mundo alucinante
- Expediente Abierto
- Periodística Mente
- EN Detalles
- Líderes

== Current journalists, TV figures and hosts ==
- Nelson Rivera
- Juan Martín Figueredo
- Rodolfo López
- Luis Martínez
- Nilda Vera
- Sara Moreno
- Javier Panza
- Enrique Vargas Peña
- Guillermo Domaniczcky
- Diego Marini
- Letizia Medina
- Ariel Palacios
- Mabel Rehnfeldt
- Pablo Guerrero
- Rubén Darío Orué
- Federico Arias
- Bruno Pont
- Daniel Chung
- Ariel Marecos
- Yennyfer Caballero
- Darío Ibarra
- Denisse Hutter
- Gladys Benítez
- Fiona Aquino
- Iván Leguizamón
- Osvaldo Cáceres
- Giuliana Tewes
- Federico Galeano Estigarribia
- Carlos Ortega
- Viviana Benítez
- Marcos Cáceres
- Edgardo Romero
- Manuel Ferreira
- Roberto Sosa
- Prince Otto
- Víctor Florentín
- Maripili Alonso
- Luis López
- Gabo Baierling
- Marta Escurra
- Magdalena Benítez
- Sergio Resquín
- Carlos Benítez

== See also ==
- Television in Paraguay
  - List of television stations in Paraguay
- Trece
- Telefuturo
- Paraguay TV
- Sistema Nacional de Televisión
- Unicanal
- Paravisión
- C9N (in spanish)
- GEN (in spanish)
- NPY (in spanish)
