= TV Cerro Corá =

- Country: Paraguay
- Broadcast area: Paraguay
- Headquarters: Asunción

Programming
- Timeshift service: Channel 9

Ownership
- Owner: Albavisión
- Key people: Carlos Delgado
- Sister channels: Paravisión, C9N, SUR Televisión Itapúa, SNT Internacional

History
- Launched: September 29, 1965; 59 years ago

Links
- Website: www.tvcerrocora.com.py

Availability

Terrestrial
- DTV: Channel 20

TV Cerro Corá is the first television station in Paraguay and is associated to the OTI. With its creation, the birth of such a medium of communication in the country takes place. It is part of the Sistema Nacional de Televisión (SNT) and is also its base station.

== History ==
=== Its beginnings ===
On September 29, 1965, Channel 9 TV Cerro Corá, of Asunción, Paraguay, began its official transmissions, after successive stages of testing. Its first program was the inauguration of its transmitting plant. The broadcast began at 19:00 hours and was narrated by the speaker Ricardo Sanabria, who in that way became the first speaker whose voice was heard in the few existing television sets. On the night of the inauguration, a documentary on the benefits of television, reported by Rodolfo Schaerer Peralta, was issued.

The antenna, the transmitter and a corridor that served as a temporary study, were on the roof of the building of the Institute of Social Security, or IPS, on the corner of Pettirossi and Constitución. Argentinean technicians trained the Paraguayan personnel.

Carlos Morínigo and Edith Victoria Ruiz Díaz, with only 16 years, were the first announcers in off (camera) to which Carmen Diaz Fares de Sanabria, Pablo R. Benítez, Vidalia Cristaldo de Delgado and Edgar Von Lucken soon joined.

In the first live commercial appeared Edith Victoria, on the roof of the building, who soon joined the reader of the first 5-minute newscast, Nelson García Ramírez. Edith was also a pioneer in children's television programs. It used a corridor of one meter of width by five meters of length, located at the end of the stairs that took to the roof.

The first program of horoscopes was carried out by a Paraguayan astrologer, who was raised after his first broadcast, because of the difficulties the driver had to speak on camera. He was replaced by Argentine coach Héctor Moyano, who said that he had done astrology studies in Buenos Aires and that he performed with the name "Karim Gestal".

In April 1966, the first formal study was enabled in an office room on the 7th floor. To the initial five-minute news produced by the Canal, where only news was read on camera, others were added that used support films: "Sucesos Paraguayos", produced by Prisciliano Sandoval and "Paraguay al día" by Alfredo Lacasa Arellano. Foreign series occupied the programming broadcast in nocturnal hours: Bat Masterson, Los Acuanautas, Lassie and Los Flintstones.

Then came the national programs and the first idols of Paraguayan television. Edith Victoria and her sister Dorita Rudy were conducting the successful "Tele Nueve Club", where an infant Manuel Cuenca was working as an assistant, only 9 years old. The first stars were born as Carmen Maida, Felicita Matosh, Sarita Rivas Crovato, Charles González Paliza. The first sports program was in charge of Jaime Arditi.

They were famous "The Show of Jacinto Herrera"; The "Jueves de Gala", with Mercedes Jané and Mario Prono, "Looking for the letter", with Carmen Maida and Rodolfo Schaerer Peralta.

After the news broadcast on the channel's roof terrace, a longer one was broadcast from the first formal study of Channel 9. They led Héctor Velázquez and Susana Ibáñez Rojas. Some news was filmed in 16mm mute film, in black and white and were reported on the images, live, from the studio. He entered as editor Víctor Bobouth Chávez, who years later conducted the "Noticiero del Mediodía", next to Flora Giménez.

=== Transmission Schedule ===
The transmission started at 17:00. He then moved at 12:00 under the leadership of brothers Arturo and Humberto Rubin, and his wife, Gloria Godoy. Also was Armando Rubin, pioneer of the teleteatros, live.

=== Videotape ===
In 1966 comes the first professional team of videotape, starting to broadcast Argentine soap operas, among them the popular "Simply Maria". Although it could already be recorded locally, the equipment of video tape was of great size, weight and electrical requirements, without being able to move of the study. Argentine telenovelas, (Desperately Living and Simply Maria) were already on the air in 1967.

=== Microwave connection ===
With the arrival of the first microwave equipment, national programs were broadcast from abroad, both live and recorded, with their subsequent broadcast.

=== First Paraguayan telenovela ===
American series, Argentine, Mexican and Brazilian telenovelas were transmitted.

The first live teleteatro was "Una noche en familia", which was broadcast in central hours in 1966. They were Mario Prono, Mercedes and Stella Maris Jané and Luis D'Oliveira, with twelve years of age.

In 1967, the Uruguayan Nelson Nelson directed several teletreatros live, in hours of the noon. They had the performance of Armando Rubin, Carla Fabri, Zuny Joy, Patricia Blasco, Juan Angel Gómez and others.

In 1978, the first telenovela was recorded in video "Magdalena de la Calle". It was recorded in natural settings such as the Ricardo Brugada Neighborhood (La Chacarita) and the Yguazú Restaurant in Asunción, in black and white. After several delays in editing, it was issued only two years later, in 1980, when several color programs were already being broadcast. The initial project of twenty chapters was reduced to 5 chapters of 60 minutes. The U-Matic videos of this production were used to record soccer matches, which disappeared this valuable testimony of the first teleteatro registered in videotape. "Magadalena de la Calle", was produced by Mercedes D'Oliveira and Eduardo Cerebello. It was directed by Silvio Martínez, with the acting director of Rudi Torga. They performed Marilyn Maciel, Miguel Angel González, Amada Gómez, Ramón Patiño, Rosaly Usedo, Ricardo Sanabria and many others.

=== Color TV ===
In 1978, the first transmissions of color image with the parties of the World-wide one of Soccer of Argentina take place.

=== Station Terrena Areguá ===
With the Earth Station of Areguá, the first satellite transmissions are received. The color transmissions are replacing those of black and white, in the beginning of the decade of 1980.

=== News ===
Miguel Ángel Rodríguez and Pelusa Rubín, as presenters, and Manuel Cuenca, in the function of reporter, participated in the traditional news program conducted by Héctor Velázquez and Susana Ibáñez Rojas, transmitted in national chain, through the microwave network of the state telephone company Antelco. Later the same thing happens with the complete programming.

=== Locutions ===
- Guillermo Reyes (1978-1992)
- Gilberto Lozana (1988-2007)
- Ángel Ferrera (1990-2009)
- Luis Carlos Pérez (1995-2011)
- Ricardo Ledesma (1996–present)
- Javier del Río (1999–present)
- Ricardo Rodas Vill (1994–present)
- Fernando Valencia (2007–present)
- Francisco Gómez Morán (2009–present)
- José Alberto Farrera (2011–present)
- Roberto Caba (2013–present)
