= ABC News =

ABC News most commonly refers to:

- ABC News (Australia), a national news service of the Australian Broadcasting Corporation
- ABC News (United States), the news-gathering and broadcasting division of the American Broadcasting Company

ABC News may also refer to:

== Broadcasting ==
=== American Broadcasting Company ===
- ABC News Live, an American streaming video news channel
- ABC News Now, a defunct American television channel
- ABC News Now (radio network), an American radio service
- ABC News Radio (United States), an American radio service

=== Australian Broadcasting Corporation ===
- ABC News Channel, the 24-hour news channel
- ABC NewsRadio (Australia), the news radio service

=== Other broadcasting ===
- ABC News (Albania)
- ABC News (Philippines), former name of News5, a Philippine news service operated by TV5
- ABC (newspaper), a Spanish daily newspaper
- ABC Color, a Paraguayan daily newspaper
  - ABC-TV (Paraguayan TV channel), TV channel owned by ABC Color
- ABC (Swedish TV programme), a former Swedish regional news programme from SVT

== Other uses ==
- ABCnews.com.co, a fake news site that spoofed the American ABC News

== See also ==
- ABC Television (disambiguation)
- ABC (disambiguation)
