= Ediciones de la Ura =

Paraguayan collective publisher

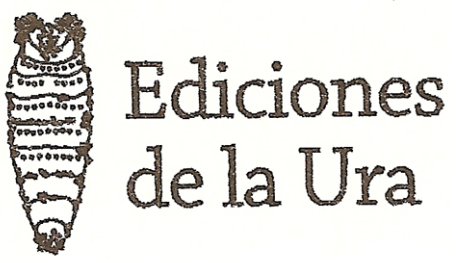
- Founded: 2000; 26 years ago
- Headquarters location: Asunción, Paraguay
- Official website: https://www.instagram.com/edicionesdelaura

Ediciones de la Ura is a Paraguayan collective publisher focused primarily on literature, but also on other forms of art.

== History ==
The publisher was born in 1997, when several independent artists from Asunción gathered in the bar Circo Bizarro, Sajonia, to talk about their art. It was officially created in 2000 with the name Ediciones de la Ura. The publisher would be called Nhanderuvuçu, after the main God in Guarani mythology, but it was renamed Dermatobia hominis, a parasitic fly that is easily mistaken for moths. It initially received help from the publisher Arandura.

== Content ==
Ediciones de la Ura focuses primarily on literature, but also produces music, videos photographs, and others. One of their most important publications was Xirú (2012), by Damián Cabrera.
