= Estadio Defensores del Chaco =

Stadium in Asunción, Paraguay

Coordinates: 25°17′31.46″S 57°39′26.57″W

- Estadio Defensores del Chaco
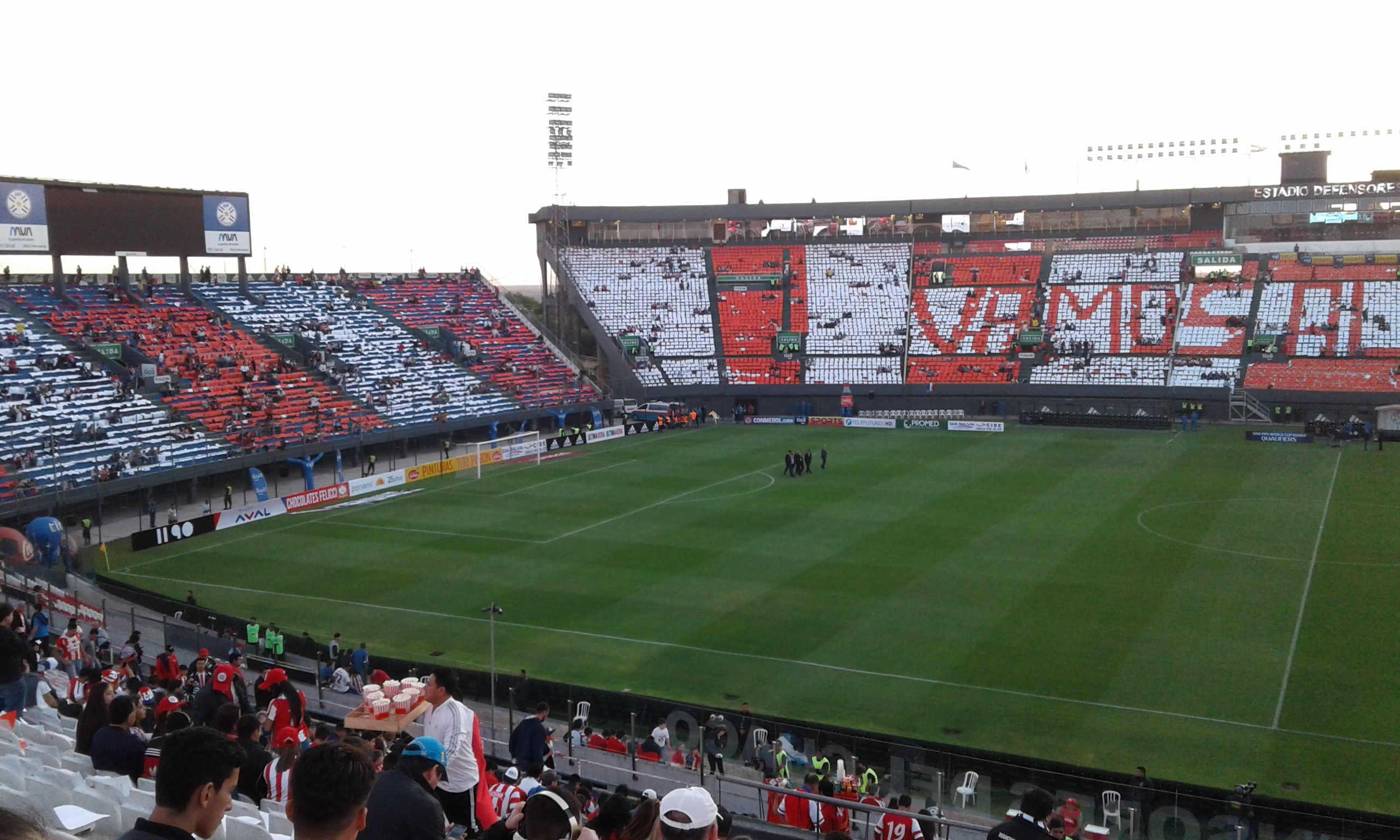
- The stadium in 2016
- Interactive map of Estadio Defensores del Chaco
- Full name: Estadio Ueno Defensores del Chaco
- Former names: Estadio de Puerto Sajonia (1917–1924, 1925–1973); Estadio Uruguay (1924); Estadio Defensores del Chaco (1973–2023)
- Location: Asunción, Paraguay
- Owner: Paraguayan Football Association
- Capacity: 34.451
- Surface: Hybrid
- Field size: 105 m × 68 m (344 ft × 223 ft)

Construction
- Opened: 1917
- Renovated: 1939; 1996; 2007; 2015

Tenants
- Paraguay national football team (1917–present); Club Guaraní; Club Olimpia; Cerro Porteño (2015–2017)

The Estadio Defensores del Chaco (Spanish pronunciation: [estaðjo defensoɾes del tʃako]; lit. 'Defenders of the Chaco Stadium', named after the Paraguayan Chaco soldiers in the Chaco War) is a multi-purpose stadium in Asunción, Paraguay. Located in the Sajonia neighbourhood, it is the owned by the Paraguayan Football Association and used mostly for football matches. In 1960, the stadium was the venue of the first final of the Copa Libertadores.

After construction the stadium had a 50,000+ capacity, however over the years the stadium has undergone remodeling in 1939, 1996 and 2007, that generally reduced it to 42,354. The stadium was again renovated in 2015, with further capacity decrease to the current 36,000 and should proceed with another process prior to 2030, restoring it to 41,186 seats.

== History ==
=== 1910s ===
In February 1916, the construction of the stadium began. In November 1917, its inauguration came as the name Stadium de Sajonia, with a game between Olimpia Asunción and Libertad, won 1-0 by the latter. In 1919, Paraguay's national team played its first game in the stadium and Faustino Casado marked Paraguay's first ever goal in the stadium.

=== 1920s ===
After Uruguay won the Olympic gold medal in football in 1924, the Paraguayan Football Association decided to rename the stadium "Uruguay" to honor the South American Nation. Later, the name was reverted to Estadio Puerto Sajonia. In August 1925, Paraguay's national team achieved its first victory in the stadium in a game against Uruguay in the Copa Bossio.

=== 1930s ===
During the Paraguay-Bolivia Chaco War, the stadium was used as a munitions depot and troop meeting arena because of its strategic location. When the war finished, the stadium began its transformation process. It was renamed with the current name Defensores del Chaco (Defenders of the Chaco) in honour of the triumphant soldiers that took part in the Chaco War between Paraguay and Bolivia.

=== 1950s ===
With the money obtained from winning the 1953 Copa América, a stand made out of cement and the orientation of the pitch changed from north to south.

=== 1960s ===
In 1960, the stadium was the venue of the first final of the Copa Libertadores, played between Olimpia Asunción and Peñarol. In 1967, the stadium inaugurated its illumination system in a friendly encounter between Paraguay and Argentina.

=== 1970s ===
In 1971, the stadium hosted the first national youth team title when Paraguay won the Torneo Juventud de América, replaced by the current South American Youth Championship. In 1972, culminated is the ampliation of the northern sector and the offices of the Asociación Paraguaya de Fútbol are moved to the stadium. In 1973, the east stand begins being constructed. In 1974, the stadium is renamed Defenders of the Chaco. In 1979, Paraguay wins the Copa América and Olimpia wins the Copa Libertadores in the stadium.

=== 1980s ===
In 1983, the stadium sees the game of mayor assistance with a crowd of 49, 095 attending the Superclásico between Cerro Porteño and Olimpia Asunción.

=== 1990s ===
In 1992, Paraguay's under-23 olympic team claimed the title of Pre-Olympic Tournament at the stadium. In 1999, the stadium was one of the main venues for the 1999 Copa América.

=== Actuality ===
The stadium is not owned by a team (it is a national stadium) and it is used primarily to host the home games of the Paraguay national football team and for international football club tournament games such as the Copa Libertadores and the Copa Sudamericana.

The new millennium brought modernization like construction of the VIP stalls, the ampliation of the boxes, stands and the installation of the Luminic LED lights.

== Tenants ==
The Paraguay national football team plays their home fixtures at the stadium during FIFA World Cup qualifiers and international friendlies.

Local clubs such as Club Libertad, Club Guaraní and Club Olimpia often play their home games at the stadium for Primera División Paraguaya, Copa Libertadores and Copa Sudamericana fixtures.

The stadium is open to the public from Monday to Friday from 8:30 to 12:00 and 14:00 to 16:00 with free access.

== Accidents and incidents ==
- 1 February 2009; two anti-riot police officers were killed and five injured when they were struck by a cement block that was part of the stadium. The cement block fell from a height of seven meters. The football match taking place during the collapse was delayed 40 minutes.

== Other events ==
Country	Artist	Date	Tour
(Sweden)	Roxette	23 April 1992	Join the Joyride! Tour
(Mexico)	Luis Miguel	3 December 1996	Tour America 1996
(Mexico)	RBD	25 April 2008	Empezar desde Cero Tour 2008
(France) (Spain) (United States) (Switzerland)	Il Divo	20 December 2011	
(United Kingdom)	Paul McCartney	17 April 2012	On the Run

== Gallery ==
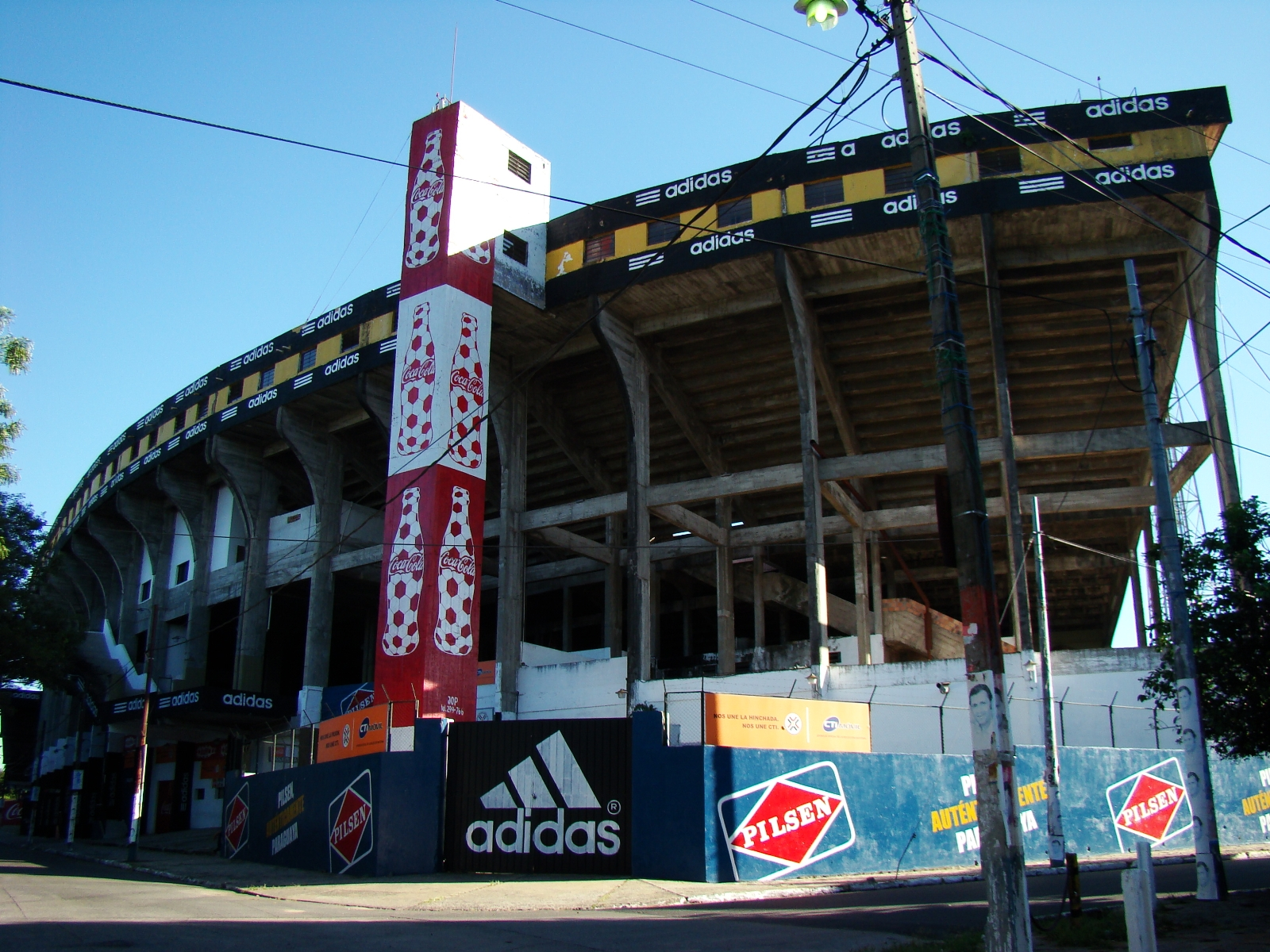
Exterior of the stadium.

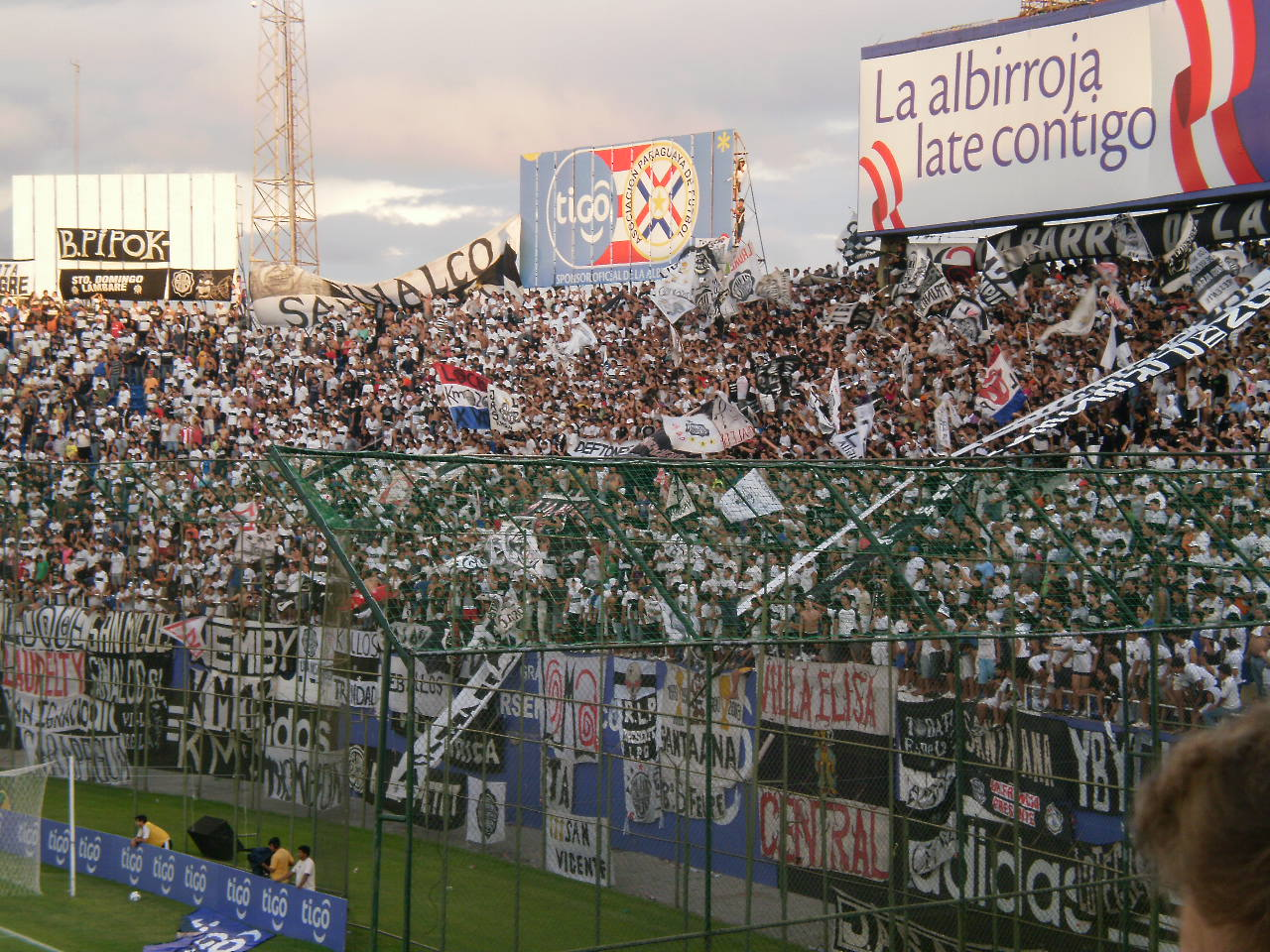
Fans of Club Olimpia Asunción.

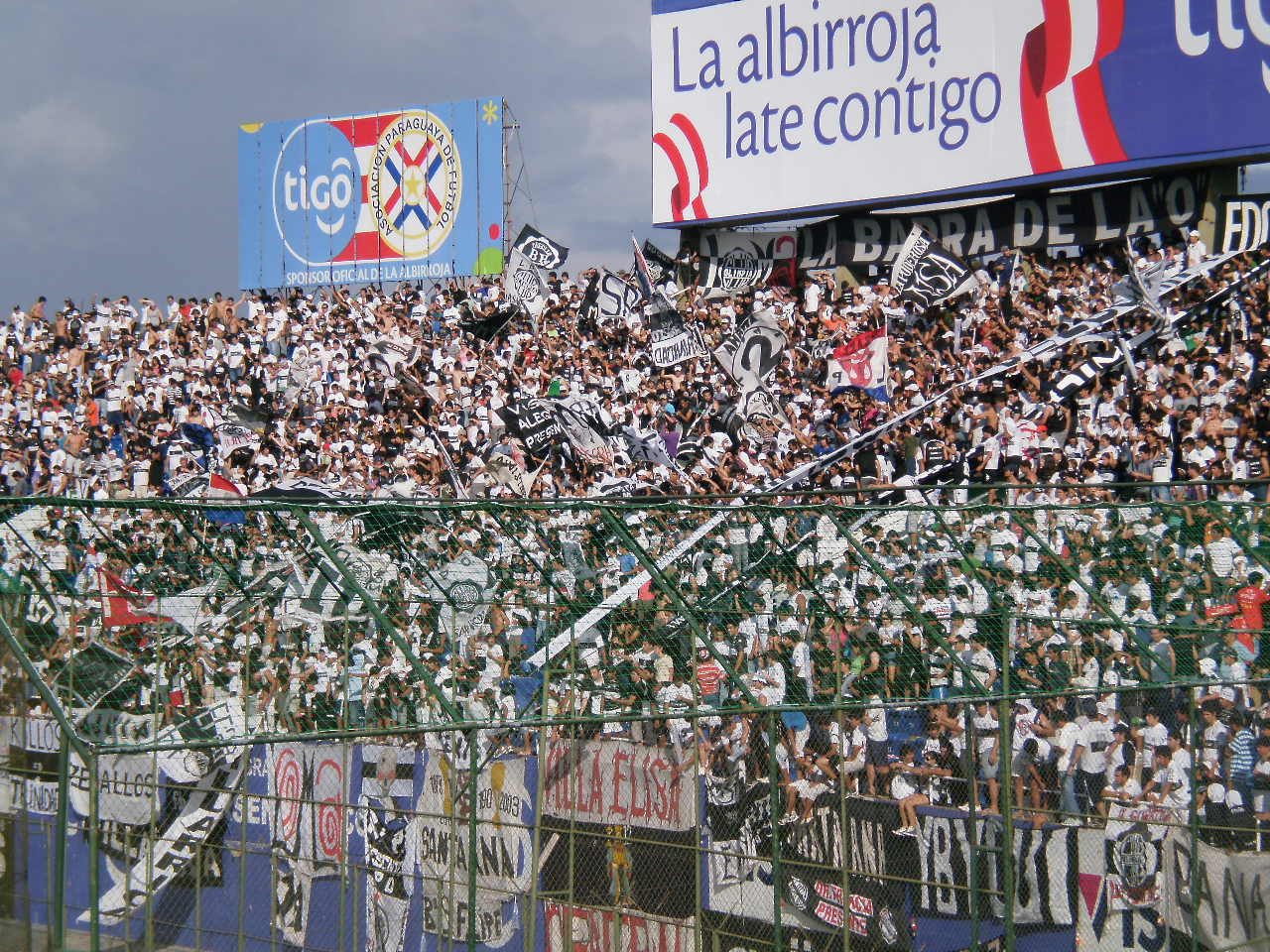
Fans of Club Olimpia Asunción.

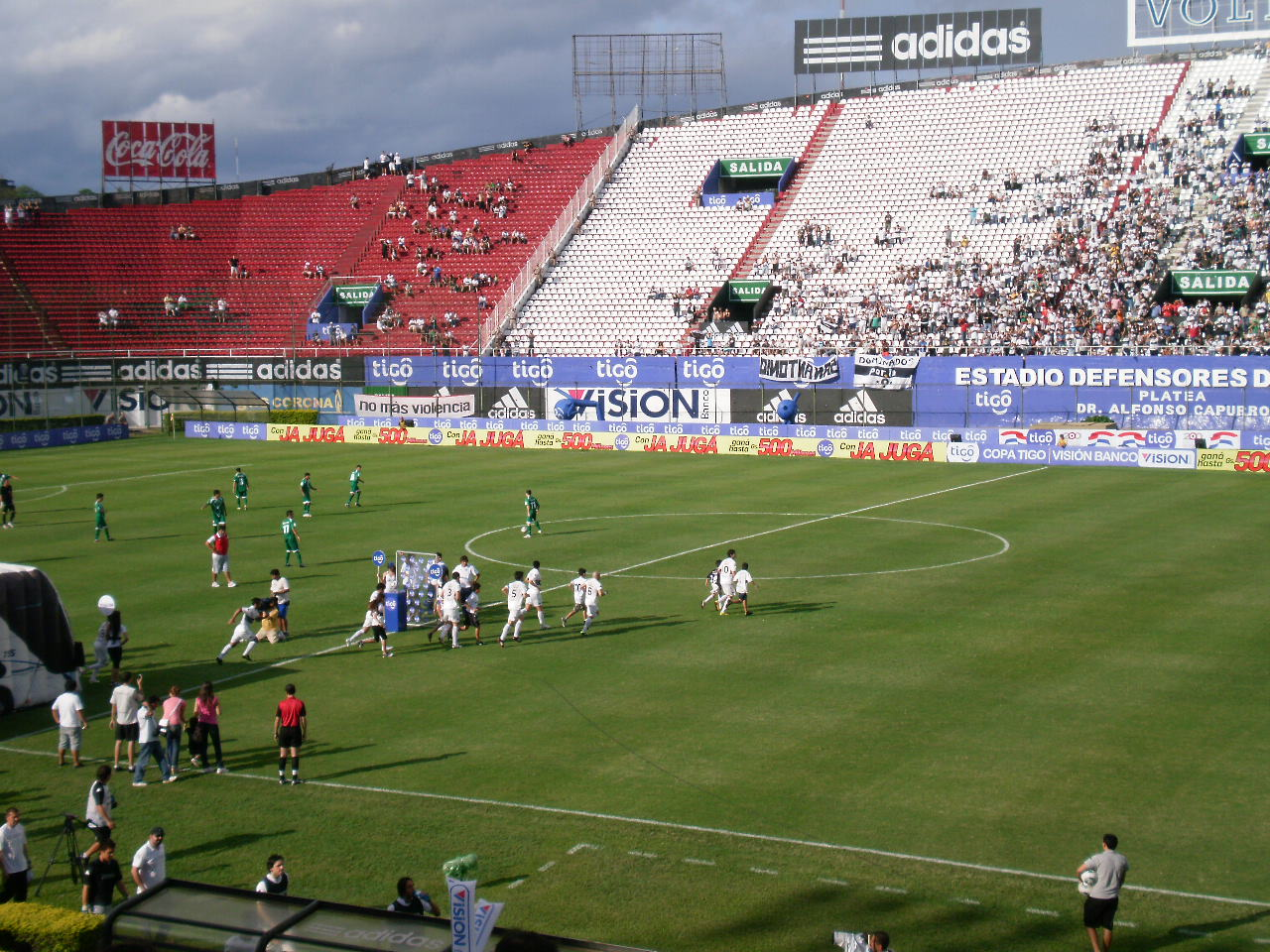
The stadium during a match between Olimpia Asunción and 3 de Febrero in 2011
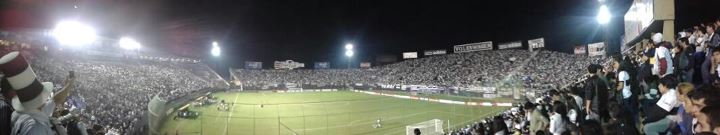

== See also ==
- List of association football stadiums by capacity
- Paraguay national football team

Preceded by Estadio Hernando Siles; La Paz	Copa América; Final Venue; 1999	Succeeded by Estadio El Campín; Bogotá
