= Paola Maltese =

Paraguayan actress, presenter and entrepreneur

- Born: Paola María Elena Maltese Mongelos; 10 January 1984 (age 42); Asunción, Paraguay
- Education: Scuola Italiana Dante Alighieri
- Occupations: Actress, presenter, entrepreneur
- Known for: MasterChef Paraguay; Universo Servilleta (2010)

Paola María Elena Maltese Mongelos, known professionally as Paola Maltese (born 10 January 1984) is a Paraguayan actress, presenter and entrepreneur. Born in Asunción, she attended the Scuola Italiana Dante Alighieri and majored in audio visual communication. As a teenager she appeared in the TV series Gonzalez vs. Bonetti, and she later landed a role in La Chuchi. On stage, she appeared in productions Sorpresas, Cinderella (La cenicienta) and Beauty and the Beast (La bella y la bestia).

Maltese is one of the presenters of the morning show Marca Latina, and a leading presenter for Radio Latina. In 2010 she featured in the film Universo Servilleta. Currently she is the host of MasterChef Paraguay.
