= Arandu Rape =

- Broadcast area: Paraguay
- Headquarters: Asunción, Paraguay

Ownership
- Owner: Ministry of Education and Culture

History
- Launched: 31 August 2009
- Closed: 2013

Arandu Rape was a Paraguayan cable television channel owned by the Ministry of Education and Culture. In addition to the TV channel, it also provided a website with its content. It closed in 2013 after debts.

== History ==
Arandu Rape started broadcasting at 7pm on 31 August 2009, initially only on Multicanal, on channel 11 of its regular cable service and channel 4 of its MMDS service (formerly TVD). Programs were produced in both official languages - Spanish and Paraguayan Guarani, and was divided in a 50/50 split between curricular and extracuriccular programs. These were broadcast in a six-hour programming wheel that changed after said wheel ran for 24 hours. The goal of the channel was to improve the education of Paraguayans, especially among poorer communities. It did not have permit from the authorities to broadcast over-the-air, and to curb the loss of its limited coverage, it was also available on bus terminals, hospital rooms and public markets. It also had a live satellite link to Escuela Básica nº 2484 of Fuerte Olimpo on launch day; though, by October, indigenous children and teachers in the area criticized delays in Fernando Lugo's promise to launch the channel locally. The launch in Fuerte Olimpo was only achieved near Christmas, when the same school that took part in the launch telecast finally received its first plasma TV set.

The channel was briefly suspended in July 2010 due to problems with its satellite uplink provided by Argentine company Ser Sat, which offered a four-month period of satellite uplink free of charge to Paraguay. The channel refused to pay a US$100,000 sum after the initial four months, which led to a dispute between the two companies that was solved, and was restored on 15 July. Earlier that year, in May, the signal in Fuerte Olimpo was blocked when government officials removed the satellite equipment for repairs that ultimately ended up inconclusive. Escuela Básica Nº 2484 director Zulma Franco criticized the measure, and that no authority informed the school of the station's cessation.

In May 2012, the channel was renamed Sarandí TV, with emphasis on children and teenagers. Part of its output would later be repeated on TV Pública Paraguay. An ABC Color columnist criticized the channel for being reliant on imported programming, and the fact that the channel was only available on cable. Under the new name, the channel was now dependent on the national public network, and had to be entirely educational "where all ideologization can be avoided".

By January 2013, the channel had reverted back to Arandu Rape and sought to recover from its precarious financial situation. The channel was presided by Ávilo Ayala since October 2012. On 20 September 2013, the government decided to end its contract with Alicante SA, which produced programs for the channel, causing an imminent closure. The closure was due to bidding problems, as the contract cost 3,5 million guaranis for cable companies for a delivery of a mere 180 hours of programming, which equaled a week in content.
