= List of television stations in Paraguay =

Television in Paraguay is most important among the country's mass media. Television programming is dominated by telenovelas, series, and news programming. Private and government-run channels coexist at the national, regional, and local levels. Cable channels are also beginning to appear, most of which are exclusive to the companies that operate them.

== Local channels ==
Sration	Channel No.	Owner	Established	Website
NPY	2	A.J. Vierci Group	2017	www.npy.com.py
Telefuturo	4	A.J. Vierci Group	1997	www.telefuturo.com.py
Paravisión	5	Albavisión	2005	www.paravision.com.py
SNT	9	Albavisión	1965	www.snt.com.py
latele	11	A.J. Vierci Group	2012	www.latele.com.py
RPC	13	JBB Group / Unicanal S.A.	1981	www.rpc.com.py
TV Pública Paraguay	14	State of Paraguay	2011	www.paraguaytv.com.py

== Others ==
- Personal Sports (Red Albirroja S.A.)
- Tigo SAT Network
- Tigo Sports (Teledeportes Paraguay S.A.)
- Tigo Max (Teledeportes Paraguay S.A)
- One Sports (Gala Producciones Paraguay S.A.)
- One Max (Gala Producciones Py S.A.)
- Tigo Movies
- Tigo Cinema & Series PPV
- Tigo Music

== See also ==
- Television in Paraguay
