= Damián Cabrera =

Paraguayan writer (born 1984)

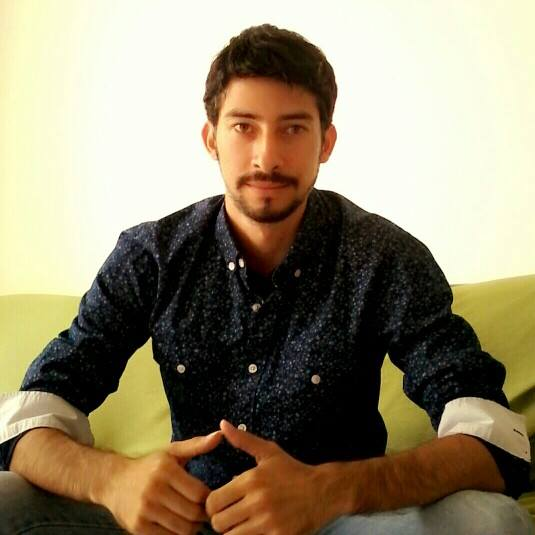
- Damián Cabrera in 2015
- Born: August 22, 1984 (age 41) Asunción, Paraguay
- Education: National University of the East; University of São Paulo

Antonio Damián Cabrera Rodríguez (born August 22, 1984, in Asunción) is a Paraguayan writer and editor.

He was the recipient of the Roque Gaona Prize in 2012 for his novel Xirú.

== Early life and education ==
Cabrera was born August 22, 1984, in Asunción, but at a young age moved to the Alto Paraná region. He completed his secondary education at the María Auxiliadora Salesian School in Minga Guazú and his higher education at the National University of the East, where he earned a bachelor's degree in literature in 2008. He later obtained a master's degree in philosophy from the University of São Paulo.

== Career ==
Cabrera published his first work in 2006, the short-story collection Sh... horas de contar... The same year, he founded the cultural magazine El Tereré.

His next book was the novel Xirú, published in 2012 by Ediciones de la Ura, with which he won the Roque Gaona Prize. In its decision, the jury described the work as "a fresco of today's Paraguay, the present with its social conflicts and invasive soy plantations coexisting with old superstitions." The plot is set in the Alto Paraná region, on the border between Paraguay and Brazil, and features four young protagonists: Gabriel, Nelson, Miguel, and César. The novel's themes include life in the Triple Frontier, its customs, cultural blending, and homosexuality.

In 2019, he published the novel Xe, which follows the story of a young man and his journeys from Asunción to Ciudad del Este, accompanied by a motorcyclist in a trip that soon turns more emotional and erotic. According to Cabrera, the title of the novel refers to the chemical element xenon and was chosen due to the popularity of xenon headlights among motorcyclists.

In 2021, he published a translation of the novel Joseph Walser’s Machine by Portuguese writer Gonçalo M. Tavares.

== Works ==
- Sh... horas de contar... (2006), short stories
- Xirú (2012), novel
- Xe (2019), novel
- Ex sylvis (2025), short stories
