= Television in Paraguay =

Television in Paraguay is most important among the country's mass media. Television programming is dominated by telenovelas, series, and news programming. Analog broadcasts are scheduled to end in phases between December 31, 2024 (in Asunción) and 2029 (when the last inland analog transmitters will be switched off).

The majority of the Paraguayan population has access to free-to-air television (over-the-air channels, mostly analog). On the other hand, pay television service (mostly digital) has increased in recent years, reaching more than 600,000 subscribers in 2018.

== History ==
Television was introduced in 1965 with the launch of TV Cerro Cora, later renamed Sistema Nacional de Televisión. Network expansion work began in 1975. SNT was the only network in Paraguay until 1981, when RPC signed on.

In 1997, Telefuturo started broadcasting. The channel initially had an agreement with Televisa to air content from its catalog.

Digital television signals started in 2011, with the launch of TV Pública Paraguay, renamed Paraguay TV in 2011. The analog signal was switched off in Asunción on December 31, 2024.

== Local channels ==
Channel	Channel no.	Owner	Established	Website
Noticias Paraguay	2	A.J. Vierci Group	2017	www.redguarani.com.py
Telefuturo	4	A.J. Vierci Group	1997	www.telefuturo.com.py
Paravisión	5	Albavisión	2004	www.paravision.com.py
SNT (Channel 9)	9	Albavisión S.A.	1965	www.snt.com.py
La Tele	11	A.J. Vierci Group	2008	www.latele.com.py
Trece	13	Javier Bernardes	1981	www.rpc.com.py
Paraguay TV	14	State of Paraguay	2011	www.paraguaytv.gov.py
Unicanal	27.2	Javier Bernardes	1989 (cable channel)	www.unicanal.com.py
TV Chaqueña	21.2	Red Chaqueña de Comunicación	2004 (cable channel)	www.rcc.com.py
América Paraguay		Grupo América	2018	www.americatv.com.py

== Most viewed channels ==
Position	Channel	Share of total viewing (%)
1	Telefuturo	20.8
2	SNT (Channel 9)	14.9
3	Latele	12.4
4	Trece/RPC	4.5
5	C9N	3.9
6	GEN	3.5
7	Paravisión	2.8
8	NPY	1.2
9	Paraguay TV	1.0
10	SUR	0.9

== See also ==
- List of television stations in Paraguay
