= Sur Televisora Itapúa =

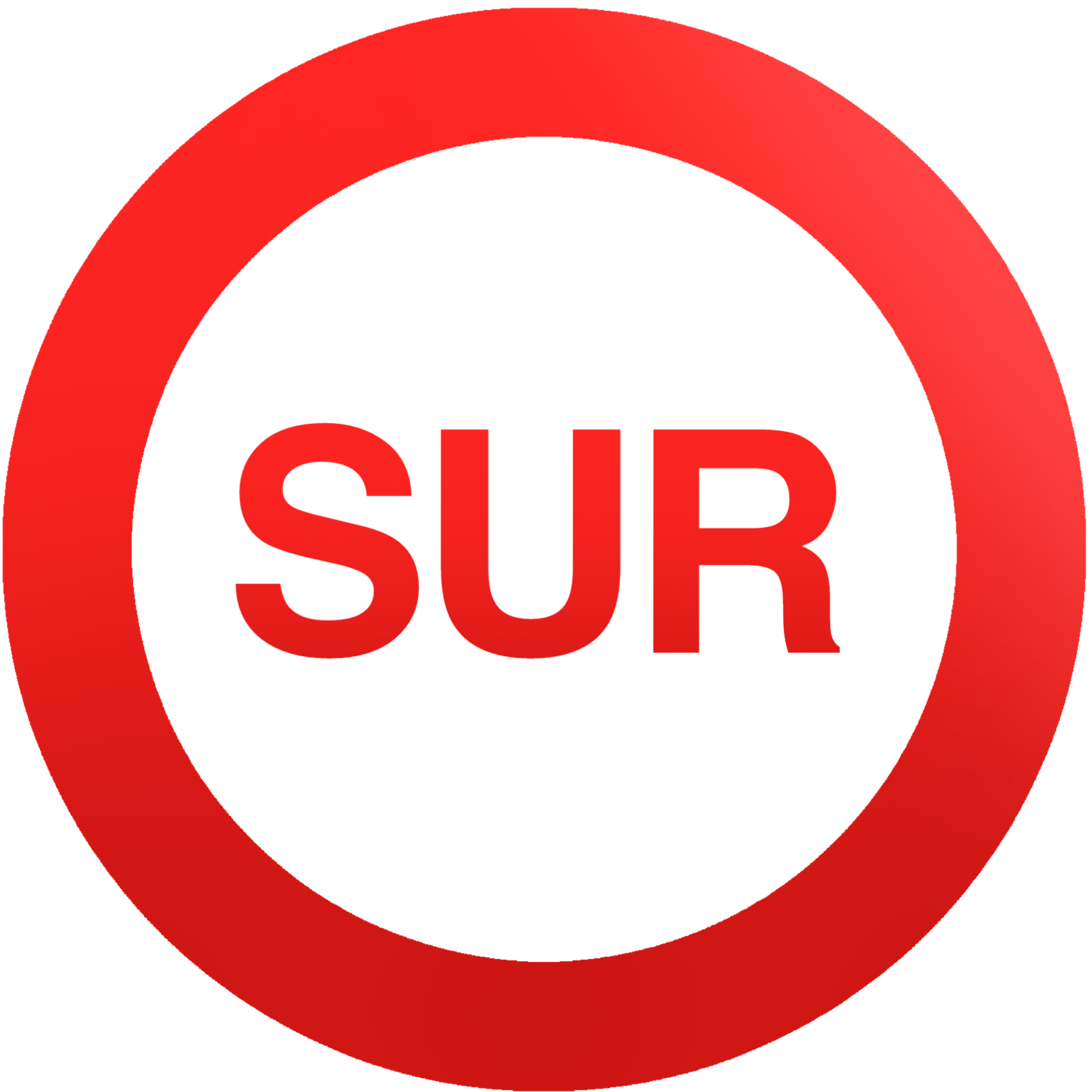
- Country: Paraguay
- Broadcast area: Paraguay
- Headquarters: Encarnación, Paraguay

Programming
- Picture format: 1080i HDTV

Ownership
- Owner: Albavisión
- Sister channels: SNT, Paravisión, C9N

History
- Launched: 3 November 1976 (affiliate of SNT)

Availability

Terrestrial
- Digital UHF (Paraguay): Channel 31.1
- Analog VHF (Paraguay) (until 2024): Channel 7 (Encarnación); Channel 10 (Asunción); Channel 10 (Fernando de la Mora); Channel 7 (Presidente Franco); Channel 11 (Ybytyruzú Hills)

Sur Televisora Itapúa, also known as Sur TV, is a Paraguayan television station located in the city of Encarnación, Itapúa. The station is a generalist outlet with national reach since 2013. For its first 37 years on air, it was a partial relayer of SNT, before becoming an independent channel within the Albavisión group.

== History ==
Work was underway in 1975 for the creation of Paraguay's first inland television station, which was under the control of channel 9 in Asunción.

TV Itapúa started broadcasting on 3 November 1976, as the first of two SNT relays that served as affiliates – the latter of which, the later Paraná TV, started in 1980 – broadcasting a VHF signal on channel 7. Until 2013, thanks to an agreement, the two SNT stations outside Asunción relayed much of the network's schedule, yet were affiliates in their own right, producing their own local programming for up to six hours each day.

Among the local programs that stood out during the SNT affiliate phase was Reporteritos, a program aimed at children, in the second half of the 2000s. In 2000, the station aired two half-hour editions of Noticiero Itapúa (7:30am and 7pm), had an hour-long morning program (Buenos Días Itapúa, from 8am) and was given a slot for rotating local programs before the evening news at 6:30pm on weekdays. Signal overspill enabled the station to be received in Misiones and Corrientes Province in Argentina. The potential sum of its viewers across its coverage area was estimated to be of 800,000 viewers.

In early August 2013, the two SNT affiliates were to be converted into two new national television channels, Televisora del Este (channel 8, Presidente Franco) and Televisora Itapúa SA (channel 7, Encarnación). Marcelo Fleitas, president of SNT, claimed that the two stations were unable to expand their coverage due to technical considerations. Moreover, SNT decided not to have affiliates outside of Asunción, unifying the capital's feed with the rest of the country, under the grounds that when the decision was taken, only Ciudad del Este was still considered a strategic location for Paraguay's economy. The president of the network, raising concerns over Albavisión controlling four television channels in Paraguay, said that SNT, Paravisión, PTV and Sur were independent channels, and that "it's wrong to say that the owner of Channel 9 now has four channels". Facing this situation SNT's national service announced that it would start broadcasting on the frequencies formerly held by the affiliates in Alto Paraná and Itapúa, whereas TVP and Sur would start broadcasting to Asunción (and nationwide) by means of Conatel decree nº. 1631/2012. This decree stipulated that Sur TV should broadcast in Asunción on channel 10 and PTV, on channel 12. Local programming on these two stations was limited, due to lack of budget.

Concerns were being raised at Conatel over the legality of these licenses mere days after the decision was taken. The issue lied in the relays the three stations wanted to build in each other's coverage areas, which did not appear in the 2011 regulations, whose primary intention was to give incentives for the installation of digital terrestrial television signals in the country. A modification was accepted to Catelpar in 2012, after a rejected petition in 2011, under the grounds that the guidelines suggested only new relay stations and not new licenses. In September, members of the Chamber of Deputies demanded an inquiry to the situation. SNT was granted channel 9 in Presidente Franco and channel 8 in Encarnación (adjacent to the existent channels), PTV was granted channel 12 in Fernando de la Mora, channel 9 in Encarnación and channel 13 in the Ybytyruzú Hills, and Sur TV, channel 10 in Fernando de la Mora, channel 7 in Presidente Franco and channel 11 in the Ybytyruzú Hills.

By mid-September, PTV and Sur TV started experimental broadcasts earlier than expected. SNT spent US$2,5 million in the overall project of setting up relay stations.

Sur TV started broadcasting as an independent service on 25 November 2013. The official launch of the reconverted service featured the presence of vice-president of Paraguay Juan Afara and notable guests from the press and political sectors, among them vice-governor of the province of Misiones Hugo Passalaqua and the channel's first director, Jorge Mateo Granada. The channel broadcast 18 hours a day, from 6am to midnight, in the new format. The channel resumed broadcasting ABC Rural, produced by ABC Color, coinciding with its 600th program. At the time, all the other television stations that carried the program were local cable channels.

The channel's oldest employee, Feliciano Espínola, left the channel due to his retirement on 31 July 2018.

A fire broke out at the channel's facilities on the morning of 21 August 2022, affecting its equipment.

In 2023, the channel held, in association with the Catholic University of Itapúa, a course for journalists in training, between October and December of that year.

== Network ==
Since 2013, Sur Televisora Itapúa has been available over-the-air in three further locations outside of Encarnación. The OTA availability of the network as of 2019 is as follows:

City	Analog callsign	Digital callsign	Analog channel	Digital channel
Presidente Franco	ZPD 497	N/A	7	N/A
Fernando de la Mora	ZPD 496	N/A	10	N/A
Ybyturuzú	ZPD 498	N/A	11	N/A
Encarnación (main station)	ZPD 907	N/A	7	N/A
