= C9N =

Paraguayan over-the-air television news network

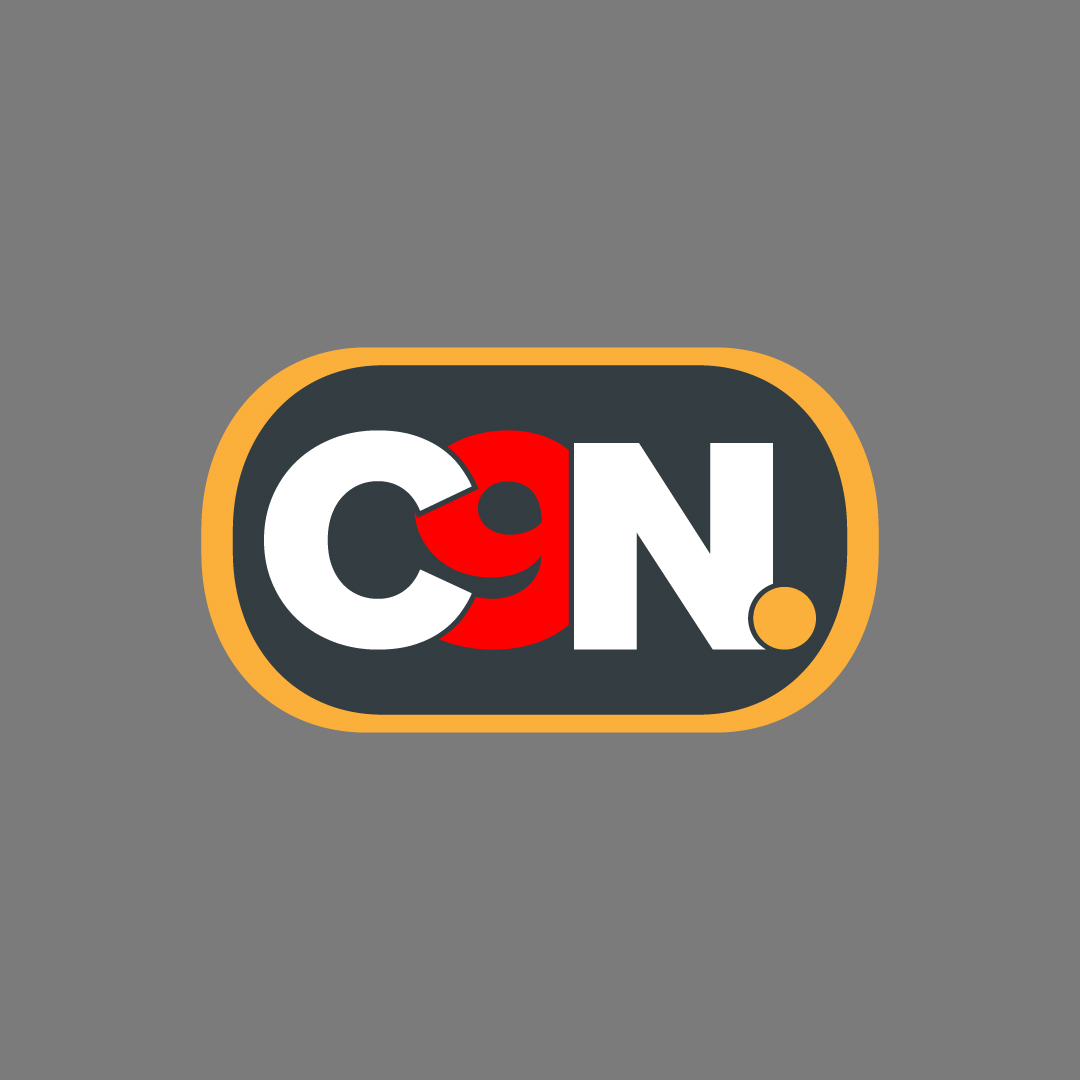
- Country: Paraguay
- Broadcast area: Paraguay
- Headquarters: Presidente Franco, Paraguay

Programming
- Picture format: 1080i HDTV

Ownership
- Owner: Albavisión
- Sister channels: SNT, Paravisión, Sur Televisora Itapúa

History
- Launched: 24 December 1979 (affiliate of SNT)

Links
- Website: www.c9n.com.py

Availability

Terrestrial
- Digital UHF (Paraguay): Channel 31.1
- Analog VHF (Paraguay) (until 2024): Channel 12 (Asunción)

C9N is a Paraguayan over-the-air news network owned by Remigio Ángel González's Albavisión conglomerate. It was an independent station from 2013 to 2017 and before, an affiliate of SNT with selected local programming.

== History ==
The station started broadcasting on December 24, 1979 as an affiliate of SNT. Until 2013, thanks to an agreement, the it and Sur Televisora Itapúa relayed much of the network's schedule, yet were affiliates in their own right, producing their own local programming for up to six hours each day.

Carlos Troche started working on this station in 1992 as a camera assistant before moving to the main Asunción station in 1993. As of 2008, the station only produced three programs, Buen día Alto Paraná, Noticiero Regional and Flash del Este.

In early August 2013, the two SNT affiliates were to be converted into two new national television channels, Televisora del Este (channel 8, Presidente Franco) and Televisora Itapúa SA (channel 7, Encarnación). Marcelo Fleitas, president of SNT, claimed that the two stations were unable to expand their coverage due to technical considerations. Moreover, SNT decided not to have affiliates outside of Asunción, unifying the capital's feed with the rest of the country, under the grounds that when the decision was taken, only Ciudad del Este was still considered a strategic location for Paraguay's economy. The president of the network, raising concerns over Albavisión controlling four television channels in Paraguay, said that SNT, Paravisión, PTV and Sur were independent channels, and that "it's wrong to say that the owner of Channel 9 now has four channels". The test broadcasts initially consisted of color bars, and the activation of the signals caused surprise among locals.

On 6 August 2013, SNT Televisora del Este pronounced itself about the conversion to a national channel, confirming industry rumors.

Concerns were being raised at Conatel over the legality of these licenses mere days after the decision was taken. The issue lied in the relays the three stations wanted to build in each other's coverage areas, which did not appear in the 2011 regulations, whose primary intention was to give incentives for the installation of digital terrestrial television signals in the country. A modification was accepted to Catelpar in 2012, after a rejected petition in 2011, under the grounds that the guidelines suggested only new relay stations and not new licenses. In September, members of the Chamber of Deputies demanded an inquiry to the situation. SNT was granted channel 9 in Presidente Franco and channel 8 in Encarnación (adjacent to the existent channels), PTV was granted channel 12 in Fernando de la Mora, channel 9 in Encarnación and channel 13 in the Ybytyruzú Hills, and Sur TV, channel 10 in Fernando de la Mora, channel 7 in Presidente Franco and channel 11 in the Ybytyruzú Hills.

The channel took the name Paraná TV in September 2013, when regular test broadcasts started. The logo used by the channel was a modified version of the one used by Peru's ATV reading PTV, which is also owned by the Albavisión conglomerate.

The channel's launch was made official on 12 November 2013, with a ceremony held at the station's headquarters in Presidente Franco.

Speaking at the 2017 edition of the La TV Que se Viene conference on 20 March 2017, Marcelo Fleitas announced the conversion of PTV into an all-news channel, C9N. The channel would continue broadcasting from its facilities in Presidente Franco, but would change its format.

On 18 April 2017, PTV was renamed C9N.
