= MasterChef Paraguay =

Paraguayan competitive cooking reality show

- Genre: Cooking; Reality show
- Created by: Franc Roddam
- Based on: MasterChef
- Directed by: Gustavo Coronel Marin
- Presented by: Paola Maltese; Mercedes Almada
- Judges: Eugenia Aquino; José Torrijos; Federico Scappini
- Narrated by: Raúl Proenza
- Country of origin: Paraguay
- Original language: Spanish
- No. of seasons: 5
- No. of episodes: 118

Production
- Executive producer: Christian Chena
- Producer: Leticia Ferreira
- Running time: 90 minutes
- Production companies: Endemol Shine Group (2018-2019); Banijay (2023-present)

Original release
- Network: Telefuturo (2018-2023); SNT (2025-present)
- Release: April 3, 2018 – present

MasterChef Paraguay is a Paraguayan competitive cooking reality show, based on the original British series of MasterChef, open to amateur and home chefs. Produced by Chena TV, it debuted on April 3, 2018 on Telefuturo.

Amateur chefs compete to become the best amateur home cook in Paraguay through challenges issued by judges Nicolás Bo, Eugenia Aquino and José Torrijos. Paola Maltese is the main host.

== Format ==
Amateur chefs were initially selected through auditions, selecting a total of two hundred competitors to the start of the televised competition. After the preliminary round, the competitors had an opportunity to prepare a signature dish for the trio of judges.

The contestants were given a limited amount of time to prep their dish, and then given five minutes before the three judges to complete the cooking and assembly of the dish, during which the judges ask about their background.

The 3 judges taste the dish, and vote "yes" or "no" to keeping the chef in the competition; 2 "yes" votes are required for the chef to move on and receive a MasterChef apron, while those that fail to do so leave the competition.

Two rounds are then used to trim the number of chefs to 18. One type of challenge has the chefs performing a routine task such as dicing onions, during which the judges will observe their technique.

Judges can advance a chef to the next round or eliminate them at any time during the challenge by taking their apron. A second type of challenge is to have the chefs invent a new dish around a staple ingredient or a theme, with the judges advancing or eliminating players based on the taste of their dishes.

In the third season, the semi-finalists competed in duels of two or three people, where they had to cook a dish with a specific topic; the winner received an apron. There was then a final last-chance cook-off to select the last participant.

Subsequently, the formal competition begins typically following a 2-event cycle that takes place over a 90-minute episode, with a chef eliminated after the second event. The events typically are: Mystery Box Challenge, Team Challenge, Elimination Test and Pressure Test.

This cycle continues until only two chefs remain. The judges then select the winner of MasterChef.

== Challenges ==
The events typically are:

- Mystery Box: Cooks are all given a box with the same ingredients and must use only those ingredients to create a dish within a fixed amount of time. The judges will taste the dishes, and then select one winner who will gain an advantage in the next test.
- Team Challenge: The cooks are taken to an off-site location and are split into 2 teams by the team captains (typically through a schoolyard pick), with the cook with the best dish in the previous test getting first pick. The teams will typically have to prepare a meal for a number of diners in a limited amount of time or engage in a "restaurant takeover or pop-up restaurant" taking the place of the staff of a particular restaurant. Diners taste both meals and vote for their favourite, causing a team to forfeit a vote if a diner does not end receiving their meal. The winning team advances, while the losing team will participate in the elimination test upon returning to the MasterChef kitchen.
- Elimination Test: The chefs are given a fixed amount of time to complete the dish. Judges evaluate all dishes based on taste and visual appeal. The judges nominate the worst two to four dishes for elimination and criticize them before telling at least one of the home cooks to place their apron on their station and "leave the MasterChef kitchen", eliminating them.
- Pressure Test: Contestants must test their knowledge and skills. The best chef will be rewarded in some way, usually with immunity, ensuring their stay in the competition one week more, or will gain an advantage in the next test.

The contestants have a certain time to perform all the tests, in which they must cook the menu and have it plated, and once finished they can not modify the dishes. The home cooks have 3 minutes to stock up on the ingredients they may need to cook from the supermarket in the indoor tests.

== Series overview ==
Season	Episodes	Premiere date	Finale date	No. of Finalists	Winner	Runner-up	Judge 1	Judge 2	Judge 3
1	20	April 3, 2018	August 7, 2018	18	María Liz Ocampos	Diego Brítez	Rodolfo Angenscheidt	Eugenia Aquino	José Torrijos
2	20	August 14, 2018	December 18, 2018	18	Nancy Talavera	Verónica Pereira	Rodolfo Angenscheidt	Eugenia Aquino	José Torrijos
3	22	April 1, 2019	August 19, 2019	21	Joaquín Alcorta	Fernando Fabio	Nicolás Bo	Eugenia Aquino	José Torrijos
4	40	August 7, 2023	December 19, 2023	22	María Marta Villalba	Shosiana Plesnar	Rodolfo Angenscheidt	Eugenia Aquino	José Torrijos

=== First Season (2018) ===
==== Top 18 ====
Contestant	Age	Residence	Occupation	Winnings	Finish	Place
María Liz Ocampos	34	Mariano Roque Alonso	Nurse	9	Episode 20	1
Diego Brítez	31	Fernando de la Mora	Merchant	11	Episode 20	2
Isabel Krause	24	Ciudad del Este	Student	6	Episode 20	3
Joseph Hsu	24	Ciudad del Este	Merchant	6	Episode 19	4
Alan Paiva	40	Caaguazú	Manager	8	Episode 18	5
Luis Rojas	32	Asunción	Merchant	4	Episode 17	6
Mauricio Machado	50	Asunción	Metrologist	1	Episode 16	7
Adriana Navratil	19	Capitán Miranda	Student	4	Episode 15	8
Arcenio Ortega	81	Lambaré	Industrial technician	2	Episode 13	9
Tania Casañas	25	Villarrica	Psychologist	0	Episode 12	10
Herminia Núñez	60	Asunción	Housewife	3	Episode 11	11
Isaac Espinosa	22	Asunción	Dustman	2	Episode 10	12
Toribia Saucedo	49	Asunción	Housewife	2	Episode 8	13
Erika Sganzella	50	Asunción	Surgeon	3	Episode 7	14
Fabián Santander	23	Asunción	Barman	1	Episode 6	15
Mercedes Pitta	20	San Lorenzo	Student	0	Episode 5	16
Evelin Giménez	34	Tobatí	Housewife	0	Episode 4	17
Renato González	26	Ciudad del Este	Manager	0	Episode 3	18

==== Elimination table ====
Place	Contestant	Episode																																							
Place	Contestant	2	3		4			5		6			7		8		9		10		11		12		13		14		15			16		17		18		19		20	
1	María Liz	IN	HIGH	IMM	IN	WIN	IMM	WIN	IMM	HIGH	WIN	IMM	IN	IMM	LOW	WIN	WIN	IMM	WIN	IMM	WIN	IMM	LOW	HIGH	ET	WIN	NC		IN	HIGH	IMM	HIGH	IMM	WIN	IMM	IN	HIGH	HIGH	LOW	HIGH	WINNER
2	Diego	IN	HIGH	IMM	IN	IN	IMM	WIN	IMM	LOW	IN	WIN	LOW	WIN	HIGH	IMM	ET	WIN	WIN	IMM	HIGH	IMM	HIGH	IMM	WIN	IMM	NC		IN	WIN	IMM	IN	HIGH	ET	WIN	IN	WIN	HIGH	WIN	WIN	RUNNER-UP
3	Isabel	IN	HIGH	IMM	IN	IN	IMM	ET	WIN	LOW	HIGH	IMM	WIN	IMM	HIGH	IMM	ET	LOW	WIN	IMM	IN	IMM	IN	IMM	WIN	IMM	NC		IN	IN	IMM	IN	IMM	WIN	IMM	IN	IN	WIN	IMM	THIRD	
4	Joseph	IN	HIGH	IMM	IN	IMM		WIN	IMM	HIGH	IN	HIGH	LOW	IN	LOW	LOW	IN	IMM	WIN	IMM	LOW	HIGH	LOW	LOW	WIN	IMM	NC		IN	LOW	WIN	WIN	IMM	WIN	IMM	IN	LOW	IN	ELIM		
5	Alan	IN	IN	WIN	IN	IN	IMM	ET	LOW	IN	HIGH	IMM	LOW	WIN	IN	IN	ET	IN	ET	WIN	LOW	WIN	WIN	IMM	WIN	IMM	NC		WIN	WIN	IMM	LOW	IN	ET	LOW	IN	ELIM				
6	Luis	IN	HIGH	IMM	IN	ET	LOW	WIN	IMM	HIGH	LOW	IN	LOW	IN	WIN	IMM	WIN	IMM	NET	IMM	LOW	LOW	HIGH	IMM	ET	LOW	NC		IN	LOW	LOW	LOW	WIN	ET	ELIM						
7	Mauricio	IN	IN	LOW	HIGH	IN	IMM	NET	IMM	IN	IN	IMM	IN	IMM	LOW	IN	ET	ELIM									IN	RET	IN	LOW	IN	LOW	ELIM								
8	Adriana	IN	WIN	IMM	HIGH	ET	IN	WIN	IMM	IN	HIGH	IMM	HIGH	IMM	IN	LOW	ET	WIN	ET	LOW	IN	HIGH	LOW	WIN	ET	HIGH	NC		IN	IN	ELIM										
9	Arcenio	IN	HIGH	IMM	IN	ET	IN	WIN	IMM	LOW	LOW	LOW	LOW	LOW	HIGH	IMM	ET	HIGH	WIN	IMM	LOW	LOW	LOW	LOW	ET	ELIM	IN	LOW													
10	Tania	IN	LOW	LOW	IN	IN	IMM	ET	IN	IN	IN	IMM	IN	IMM	IN	LOW	ET	IN	ET	IN	HIGH	IMM	IN	ELIM																	
11	Herminia	LOW	NC	WIN	LOW	NC	LOW	ET	WIN	IN	LOW	HIGH	LOW	LOW	HIGH	IMM	ET	LOW	ET	LOW	LOW	ELIM					WIN	IN													
12	Isaac	IN	HIGH	IMM	WIN	IMM		WIN	IMM	LOW	IN	LOW	IN	IMM	IN	IN	IN	IMM	ET	ELIM							LOW	NC													
13	Toribia	IN	HIGH	IMM	IN	WIN	IMM	ET	IN	WIN	IMM		IN	IMM	IN	ELIM											HIGH	LOW													
14	Erika	WIN	IMM		IN	ET	WIN	WIN	IMM	IN	IN	IMM	LOW	ELIM													HIGH	IN													
15	Fabián	WIN	IMM		IN	ET	IN	ET	LOW	IN	LOW	ELIM															LOW	NC													
16	Mercedes	IN	LOW	LOW	IN	IN	IMM	ET	ELIM																		LOW	NC													
17	Evelin	IN	IN	LOW	IN	ET	ELIM																				LOW	NC													
18	Renato	LOW	NC	ELIM																							LOW	NC													

Key

- Winner
- Runner-up
- Individual challenge winner
- Individual challenge top entry
- Individual challenge bottom entry
- Team challenge winner
- Team challenge loser
- Immunity
- Immunity extra
- Did not compete
- Saved last
- Eliminated
- Returned
- Withdrew
- Disqualified

=== Second Season (2018) ===
==== Top 18 ====
Contestant	Age	Residence	Occupation	Winnings	Finish	Place
Nancy Talavera	33	Presidente Franco	Housemaid	11	Episode 20	1
Verónica "Veró" Pereira	28	Asunción	Make-up artist	11	Episode 20	2
Fernando Ramírez	34	Asunción	Merchant	6	Episode 19	3
Tatiana Renna	42	San Lorenzo	Housewife	6	Episode 18	4
Jorgelina Salgado	27	Asunción	Insurance agent	3	Episode 17	5
Sara Cheblis	28	Asunción	Barista	4	Episode 16	6
Francisca "Kiki" Jara	61	Villa Elisa	Housewife	7	Episode 15	7
Diego Paredes	31	Asunción	Lawyer / Firefighter	3	Episode 14	8
Armando Riveros	39	Coronel Oviedo	Councilman	4	Episode 13	9
Karen Chiri	29	San Lorenzo	Craftswoman	2	Episode 11	10
Juan Marcelo Torres	32	Villa Elisa	Civil engineer	0	Episode 9	11
Joaquín Alcorta	32	Fernando de la Mora	Graphic designer	2	Episode 9	12 (WDR)
Rolando Raúl Núñez	25	Fernando de la Mora	Former football player	2	Episode 8	13
Ulises León	57	Asunción	Architect	2	Episode 7	14
Ingrid Armoa	44	Asunción	Lawyer / Radio presenter	0	Episode 6	15
Nora Sánchez	28	Fernando de la Mora	Nurse	1	Episode 5	16
Aldana Damelio	24	Asunción	Student	1	Episode 4	17
Javier Manera	30	Ciudad del Este	Merchant	0	Episode 3	18

==== Elimination table ====
Place	Contestant	Episode																																					
Place	Contestant	2	3		4		5		6			7		8		9		10		11		12		13			14		15		16		17		18		19		20
1	Nancy	IN	WIN	IMM	WIN	IMM	ET	LOW	LOW	HIGH	IMM	WIN	IMM	IN	IMM	IN	IMM	NET	IMM	WIN	IMM	NC		ET	WIN	IMM	WIN	IMM	WIN	IMM	WIN	IMM	IN	WIN	WIN	IMM	HIGH	WIN	WINNER
2	Veró	WIN	IMM		ET	WIN	WIN	IMM	IN	HIGH	IMM	ET	WIN	LOW	WIN	ET	WIN	ET	ELIM			HIGH	RET	WIN	IMM		IN	WIN	ET	WIN	ET	IN	LOW	LOW	IN	WIN	WIN	HIGH	RUNNER-UP
3	Fernando	IN	WIN	IMM	ET	LOW	IN	IMM	IN	IN	HIGH	WIN	IMM	HIGH	IMM	ET	HIGH	WIN	IMM	ET	HIGH	NC		WIN	IMM		HIGH	IMM	WIN	IMM	ET	WIN	IN	IN	LOW	LOW	IN	ELIM	
4	Tatiana	IN	HIGH	IMM	ET	LOW	ET	WIN	IN	IN	LOW	NET	IMM	LOW	WIN	IN	IMM	ET	WIN	IN	IMM	NC		ET	WIN	IMM	HIGH	IMM	ET	LOW	WIN	IMM	WIN	IMM	HIGH	ELIM			
5	Jorgelina	IN	IN	IMM	NET	IMM	ET	HIGH	IN	IN	LOW	ET	IN	WIN	IMM	IN	IMM	WIN	IMM	IN	IMM	NC		ET	NC			IN	IN	IMM	WIN	IMM	IN	ELIM					
6	Sara	IN	LOW	LOW	WIN	IMM	IN	IMM	LOW	IN	WIN	WIN	IMM	IN	IMM	ET	LOW	WIN	IMM	ET	IN	NC		ET	IN	IMM	IN	LOW	ET	LOW	ET	ELIM							
7	Kiki	IN	HIGH	IMM	WIN	WIN	WIN	IMM	HIGH	WIN	IMM	WIN	IMM	HIGH	IMM	ET	IN	WIN	IMM	ET	IN	NC		ET	LOW	WIN	HIGH	IMM	ET	ELIM									
8	Diego	IN	IN	IN	WIN	IMM	IN	IMM	HIGH	IN	IN	ET	LOW	LOW	LOW	ET	LOW	ET	IN	ET	WIN	NC		WIN	IMM		IN	ELIM											
9	Armando	IN	LOW	IN	WIN	IMM	ET	LOW	LOW	LOW	LOW	WIN	IMM	LOW	IN	IN	IMM	WIN	IMM	ET	ELIM	HIGH	RET	ET	LOW	ELIM													
10	Karen	IN	HIGH	IMM	NET	IMM	ET	LOW	IN	LOW	HIGH	WIN	IMM	LOW	IN	WIN	IMM	ET	LOW	ET	ELIM	HIGH	IN																
11	Juan	IN	LOW	LOW	ET	LOW	IN	IMM	IN	HIGH	IMM	ET	LOW	HIGH	IMM	ET	ELIM					LOW	NC																
12	Joaquín	WIN	IMM		ET	HIGH	ET	HIGH	IN	WIN	IMM	ET	HIGH	HIGH	IMM	WDR																							
13	Raúl	IN	LOW	IN	WIN	IMM	ET	IN	HIGH	HIGH	IMM	WIN	IMM	LOW	ELIM							HIGH	IN																
14	Ulises	IN	HIGH	IMM	WIN	HIGH	IN	IMM	WIN	IMM		ET	ELIM									HIGH	LOW																
15	Ingrid	IN	HIGH	IMM	ET	HIGH	IN	IMM	LOW	IN	ELIM											LOW	NC																
16	Nora	IN	LOW	LOW	WIN	IMM	ET	ELIM														HIGH	LOW																
17	Aldana	LOW	NC	WIN	ET	ELIM																																	
18	Javier	LOW	NC	ELIM																		LOW	NC																

Key

- Winner
- Runner-up
- Individual challenge winner
- Individual challenge top entry
- Individual challenge bottom entry
- Team challenge winner
- Team challenge loser
- Immunity
- Immunity extra
- Did not compete
- Saved last
- Eliminated
- Returned
- Withdrew
- Disqualified

=== Third Season (2019) ===
==== Top 21 ====
Contestant	Age	Residence	Occupation	Winnings	Finish	Place
Joaquín Alcorta	33	Fernando de la Mora	Graphic designer/Season 2 Contestant	9	Episode 22	1
Fernando Fabio	42	Asunción	Crane driver	6	Episode 22	2
Isaías Ledesma	20	Coronel Oviedo	Student	9	Episode 21	3
Ricardo Aranda	22	Villa Hayes / Limpio	Student	8	Episode 20	4
Noelia Leguizamón	38	Fernando de la Mora	Dentist	5	Episode 19	5
Juliana Sosa	22	Asunción	Student	1	Episode 18	6
Marta "Martita" Martínez	27	San Lorenzo	Musician	3	Episode 17	7
Walter Galeano	38	Mariano Roque Alonso	Night watchman	4	Episode 16	8
Andrea Vera	22	Ñemby	Housewife	4	Episode 15	9
Ross Collins	54	Asunción	University professor	4	Episode 12	10 (WDR)
Armando Costa	28	Hernandarias	Merchant	1	Episode 11	11
Demian Matos	41	Asunción	Merchant	3	Episode 10	12
Perla Orué	56	Asunción	Dressmaker	1	Episode 9	13
Laura Chamorro	26	San Lorenzo	Student	3	Episode 8	14
César Ocampos	25	Itacurubí del Rosario / Lambaré	Bartender	2	Episode 8	15 (WDR)
Ruth "Ruthy" Ubrán	26	Asunción	Nutritionist	1	Episode 7	16
Cecilia Paredes	31	Encarnación	Make-up artist	0	Episode 6	17
Carlos Pereira	38	Ciudad del Este	Stylist	0	Episode 5	18
Rita Benítez	30	Lambaré / Asunción	Make-up artist	0	Episode 4	19
Ruth González	71	Formosa / Luque	Housewife	0	Episode 3	20
Víctor Sacco	48	Asunción	Business advisor	0	Episode 3	21 (WDR)

==== Elimination table ====
Place	Contestant	Episode																																														
Place	Contestant	1	2	3		4		5		6			7		8			9		10		11		12		13			14			15		16		17			18		19			20		21		22
1	Joaquín			RET	HIGH	ET	WIN	IN	IMM	HIGH	IMM		ET	IN	HIGH	IMM		WIN	IMM	HIGH	IMM	WIN	IMM	NET	IMM	IN	HIGH	IMM	NC			LOW	WIN	LOW	HIGH	IN	WIN	IMM	ET	WIN	IN	WIN	IMM	LOW	WIN	WIN	IMM	WINNER
2	Fernando		IN	NC	IMM	IN	IMM	ET	HIGH	HIGH	WIN	IMM	ET	HIGH	IN	IMM		LOW	LOW	HIGH	IMM	IN	WIN	WIN	IMM	IN	HIGH	IMM	NC			HIGH	IMM	HIGH	IMM	IN	IN	WIN	ET	HIGH	IN	HIGH	IMM	WIN	IMM	IN	WIN	RUNNER-UP
3	Isaías	IN		NC	IMM	WIN	IMM	ET	WIN	IN	IN	IMM	ET	LOW	WIN	IMM		HIGH	IMM	WIN	IMM	LOW	LOW	ET	WIN	IN	IN	ELIM	WIN	RET	NC	HIGH	IMM	LOW	LOW	WIN	IN	LOW	ET	LOW	LOW	LOW	WIN	IN	LOW	IN	ELIM	
4	Ricardo	IN		NC	IN	WIN	IMM	WIN	IMM	IN	IN	IMM	ET	HIGH	LOW	WIN	IMM	NC	HIGH	IN	IMM	IN	LOW	ET	LOW	IN	LOW	LOW	NC			WIN	IMM	IN	WIN	IN	WIN	IMM	WIN	IMM	WIN	IMM		IN	ELIM			
5	Noelia	IN		NC	HIGH	WIN	IMM	IN	IMM	HIGH	IMM		WIN	IMM	HIGH	IMM		IN	LOW	LOW	LOW	HIGH	IMM	WIN	IMM	IN	IN	WIN	NC			IN	IMM	IN	LOW	IN	LOW	IN	WIN	IMM	IN	LOW	ELIM					
6	Juliana		IN	NC	IN	ET	LOW	IN	IMM	LOW	HIGH	IMM	ET	IMM	IN	IN	HIGH	LOW	IN	IN	LOW	HIGH	IMM	ET	HIGH	IN	IN	IN	NC			LOW	IN	WIN	IMM	IN	LOW	HIGH	ET	ELIM								
7	Martita	IN		NC	IMM	IN	IMM	ET	LOW	HIGH	IMM		WIN	IMM	IN	HIGH	IMM	IN	WIN	IN	HIGH	HIGH	IMM	ET	ELIM				HIGH	IN	RET	IN	LOW	HIGH	IMM	IN	IN	ELIM										
8	Walter	IN		NC	LOW	ET	IN	ET	LOW	WIN	IMM		WIN	IMM	IN	LOW	LOW	HIGH	IMM	IN	IMM	IN	IN	WIN	IMM	IN	WIN	IMM	NC			LOW	NC		ELIM													
9	Andrea		IN	NC	IMM	ET	LOW	WIN	IMM	HIGH	IMM		ET	LOW	LOW	LOW	WIN	IN	HIGH	IN	IN	HIGH	IMM	WIN	IMM	WIN	IMM		NC			IN	ELIM															
10	Ross		IN	NC	WIN	ET	WIN	IN	IMM	IN	LOW	LOW	WIN	IMM	IN	HIGH	IMM	HIGH	IMM	LOW	WIN	NC			WDR																							
11	Armando		IN	NC	IMM	ET	IN	ET	IN	LOW	LOW	LOW	ET	WIN	HIGH	IN	HIGH	HIGH	IMM	IN	IMM	IN	ELIM																									
12	Demian	ELIM		RET	IMM	ET	WIN	ET	HIGH	LOW	HIGH	IMM	WIN	IMM	IN	IN	LOW	LOW	LOW	IN	ELIM																											
13	Perla		IN	NC	IMM	IN	IMM	IN	IMM	IN	LOW	IN	WIN	IMM	LOW	LOW	IN	IN	ELIM										LOW	LOW	NC																	
14	Laura		IN	NC	IMM	WIN	IMM	IN	IMM	HIGH	LOW	WIN	WIN	IMM	IN	IN	ELIM												HIGH	HIGH	IN																	
15	César		IN	NC	HIGH	ET	WIN	IN	IMM	IN	LOW	HIGH	WIN	IMM	IN	HIGH	WDR																															
16	Ruthy		IN	NC	IMM	ET	WIN	IN	IMM	IN	HIGH	IMM	ET	ELIM															IN	IN	IN																	
17	Cecilia		IN	NC	IMM	ET	LOW	ET	LOW	IN	IN	ELIM																	HIGH	LOW	NC																	
18	Carlos	IN		NC	LOW	IN	IMM	ET	ELIM																				LOW	IN	HIGH																	
19	Rita		IN	NC	IMM	ET	ELIM																																									
20	Ruth		IN	NC	ELIM																								IN	LOW	NC																	
21	Víctor		IN	NC	WDR																																											

Key

- Winner
- Runner-up
- Individual challenge winner
- Individual challenge top entry
- Individual challenge bottom entry
- Team challenge winner
- Team challenge loser
- Immunity
- Immunity extra
- Did not compete
- Saved last
- Eliminated
- Returned
- Withdrew

=== Fourth Season (2023) ===
==== Top 22 ====
Contestant	Age	Residence	Occupation	Winnings	Finish	Place
María Marta "Martita" Villalba	42	Ciudad del Este	Dentist	8	Episode 40	1
Shosiana Plesnar	27	Asunción	Student	9	Episode 40	2
Santiago Canuto	43	Asunción	Sommelier	5	Episode 38	3
Sofía "Sofí" Bramante	36	Luque	Merchant	8	Episode 36	4
Leila Jazmín Encina	42	Lambaré	Merchant	4	Episode 34	5
Víctor Reyes	20	Presidente Franco	Student	3	Episode 32	6
Lucas "Lucata" Ortellado	24	Asunción	Student	2	Episode 30	7
Gabriel Colmán	46	Villa Elisa	Music producer	4	Episode 28	8
Dominga Natalia Delgadillo	30	Luque	Commercial engineer	3	Episode 26	9
Luz Urunaga	26	Presidente Franco	Petty officer	4	Episode 24	10
Víctor Hugo Maldonado	37	Quiindy	Lawyer	2	Episode 20	11
Caroline "Caro" Elizabeth Sosa	49	Caacupé	Nurse	2	Episode 18	12
Paolo Di Caterina	25	Capiatá	Merchant	1	Episode 14	13
Javier "Pipe" Ramírez	29	Luque	Student	1	Episode 12	14–15
Leonardo "Leo" Zarza	32	Villa Elisa	Stylist	1	Episode 12	14–15
Juan Duarte	33	Lambaré	Merchant	0	Episode 10	16
Claudia Romero	44	Ñemby	Nutritionist	0	Episode 10	17
Rubén Cardus	31	Asunción	Photographer	0	Episode 8	18
Carlos Rolón	31	Fernando de la Mora	Barber	0	Episode 6	19–20
Marcela Verena Peña	30	Capiatá	Doctor	0	Episode 6	19–20
Fabrizzio Valdez	22	Asunción	Employee	0	Episode 4	21–22
Yong Sing Choi	41	Asunción	Cook	0	Episode 4	21–22

==== Elimination table ====
Place	Contestant	Episode																																										
Place	Contestant	3		4	5	6	7		8	9	10	11	12	13	14	15		16	17	18	19	20	21	22	23	24	25	26		27	28	29		30	31	32	33	34	35	36	37	38	39	40
1	Martita	LOW	NC	WIN	WIN	IMM	IN	HIGH	IMM	NET	IMM	LOW	WIN	LOW	LOW	IN	IN	HIGH	IN	IN	WIN	IMM	NC		IN	HIGH	WIN	IMM		WIN	IMM	IN	LOW	HIGH	IN	LOW	IN	IN	IN	WIN	WIN	IMM	WINNER	
2	Shosiana	NC	WIN	IMM	WIN	IMM	HIGH	IMM		WIN	IMM	LOW	HIGH	HIGH	IMM	IN	IN	IN	IN	WIN	WIN	IMM	NC		IN	HIGH	HIGH	IMM		WIN	IMM	WIN	HIGH	IMM	IN	IN	IN	WIN	HIGH	LOW	HIGH	WIN	RUNNER-UP	
3	Santiago	LOW	NC	HIGH	IN	IMM	IN	HIGH	IMM	ET	HIGH	LOW	IN	LOW	LOW	IN	HIGH	IMM	LOW	LOW	WIN	IMM	NC		WIN	IMM	HIGH	IMM		LOW	WIN	HIGH	LOW	WIN	IN	HIGH	IN	HIGH	WIN	IMM	IN	ELIM		
4	Sofí	HIGH	NC	IMM	ET	WIN	HIGH	IMM		ET	LOW	IMM		IN	WIN	IN	IN	WIN	WIN	IMM	IN	IN	NC		IN	WIN	IN	WIN	IMM	IN	HIGH	IN	WIN	IMM	WIN	IMM	IN	LOW	HIGH	ELIM				
5	Jazmín	HIGH	NC	IMM	IN	IMM	LOW	LOW	HIGH	WIN	IMM	WIN	IMM	HIGH	IMM	IN	IN	ELIM					HIGH	RET	IN	IN	IN	HIGH	IMM	LOW	IN	IN	LOW	LOW	LOW	WIN	IN	ELIM						
6	Víctor	HIGH	NC	IMM	ET	LOW	LOW	IN	IMM	WIN	IMM	IMM		WIN	IMM	WIN	IMM		HIGH	IMM	LOW	LOW	NC		LOW	LOW	HIGH	IMM		HIGH	IMM	HIGH	IN	IN	LOW	ELIM								
7	Lucata	NC	LOW	LOW	IN	IMM	IN	LOW	IN	ET	HIGH	IMM		HIGH	IMM	WIN	IMM		IN	HIGH	LOW	HIGH	NC		IN	LOW	LOW	LOW	WIN	IN	LOW	LOW	IN	ELIM										
8	Gabriel	NC	HIGH	IMM	ET	IN	WIN	IMM		WIN	IMM	HIGH	IMM	IMM		IN	WIN	IMM	IN	HIGH	WIN	IMM	NC		IN	IN	LOW	HIGH	IMM	IN	ELIM													
9	Natalia	HIGH	NC	IMM	IN	IMM	IN	LOW	WIN	WIN	IMM	HIGH	IMM	LOW	LOW	IN	HIGH	IMM	IN	LOW	WIN	IMM	NC		LOW	LOW	LOW	LOW	ELIM															
10	Luz	NC	LOW	HIGH	ET	HIGH	IN	WIN	IMM	WIN	IMM	LOW	IN	LOW	WIN	IN	IN	LOW	IN	IN	IN	WIN	NC		LOW	ELIM																		
11	Hugo	NC	LOW	LOW	ET	HIGH	LOW	HIGH	IMM	ET	WIN	IMM		HIGH	IMM	IN	WIN	IMM	IN	LOW	IN	ELIM	HIGH	IN																				
12	Caro	NC	HIGH	IMM	IN	IMM	HIGH	IMM		WIN	IMM	IN	IN	IN	IN	IN	IN	LOW	LOW	ELIM			WIN	HIGH																				
13	Paolo	NC	LOW	IN	ET	IN	HIGH	IMM		WIN	IMM	LOW	HIGH	LOW	ELIM																													
14–15	Pipe	NC	WIN	IMM	ET	HIGH	IN	HIGH	IMM	ET	LOW	LOW	ELIM										HIGH	IN																				
14–15	Leo	NC	LOW	IN	ET	LOW	HIGH	IMM		ET	IN	LOW	ELIM										WIN	HIGH																				
16	Juan	LOW	NC	HIGH	IN	IMM	IN	LOW	HIGH	ET	ELIM												HIGH	LOW																				
17	Claudia	NC	HIGH	IMM	IN	IMM	LOW	LOW	LOW	ET	ELIM												IN	LOW																				
18	Rubén	HIGH	NC	IMM	IN	IMM	IN	LOW	ELIM														LOW	NC																				
19–20	Carlos	HIGH	NC	IMM	ET	ELIM																	LOW	NC																				
19–20	Verena	LOW	NC	HIGH	ET	ELIM																																						
21–22	Fabrizzio	NC	LOW	ELIM																																								
21–22	Yong	LOW	NC	ELIM																			LOW	NC																				

Key

- Winner
- Runner-up
- Individual challenge winner
- Individual challenge top entry
- Individual challenge bottom entry
- Team challenge winner
- Team challenge loser
- Immunity
- Immunity extra
- Did not compete
- Saved last
- Eliminated
- Returned
- Withdrew
- Disqualified

== MasterChef Profesionales ==
Season	Episodes	Premiere date	Finale date	No. of Finalists	Winner	Runner-up	Judge 1	Judge 2	Judge 3
1	16	September 9, 2019	December 23, 2019	18	Julián Endara	Rodrigo León	Nicolás Bo	Eugenia Aquino	José Torrijos

=== First Season (2019) ===
==== Top 18 ====
Contestant	Age	Residence	Occupation	Winnings	Finish	Place
Julián Endara	37	Asunción	Chef owner	10	Episode 16	1
Rodrigo León	25	Asunción	Chef of restaurant	5	Episode 16	2
Juan Ángel Villamayor	39	San Bernardino	Independent chef	7	Episode 15	3–4
Waldino "Waldi" Riveros	46	Luque	Executive chef	3	Episode 15	3–4
Carolina Ronquillo	31	Asunción	Chef owner	7	Episode 14	5
Walter Ferreira	39	Lambaré	Executive chef	1	Episode 13	6
Lizzi Piñánez	28	Pirayú	Independent chef	1	Episode 12	7
Pedro "Peta" Rüger	41	Asunción	Independent chef	3	Episode 11	8
Sergio Vera	23	Luque	Sous-chef of restaurant/steakhouse	2	Episode 10	9
Osvaldo Villalba	37	Asunción	Chef of restaurant	1	Episode 9	10–11
Regina Cabañas	25	Asunción	Chef of restaurant	4	Episode 9	10–11
Leticia Duarte	36	Fernando de la Mora	Chef owner	1	Episode 8	12
Gabriel "Negro" Riveros	44	Luque	Chef owner of restaurant/barbecue	0	Episode 7	13
Alexander "Alex" Cardozo	25	Asunción	Chef de cuisine	1	Episode 6	14
Karina Ruiz Díaz	35	Asunción	Chef de cuisine	1	Episode 5	15
Eduardo Caballero	35	Luque / Capiatá	Chef de cuisine	1	Episode 4	16
Juan Ávila	25	Mariano Roque Alonso	Chef owner	0	Episode 3	17–18
Pablo Mármol	42	Asunción	Chef de cuisine	0	Episode 3	17–18

==== Elimination table ====
Place	Contestant	Episode																																
Place	Contestant	1	2	3		4			5		6		7			8			9		10		11		12			13		14		15		16
1	Julián		IN	WIN	IMM	WIN	IMM		WIN	IMM	WIN	IMM	HIGH	WIN	IMM	WIN	IMM		ET	WIN	IN	LOW	IN	IN	IN	IN	WIN	WIN	IMM	IN	HIGH	IN	WIN	WINNER
2	Rodrigo	IN		ET	HIGH	IN	WIN	IMM	WIN	IMM	ET	WIN	LOW	LOW	IN	HIGH	IMM		ET	HIGH	HIGH	IMM	IN	WIN	LOW	HIGH	IMM	IN	LOW	IN	WIN	IN	HIGH	RUNNER-UP
3–4	Juan Ángel		IN	WIN	IMM	IN	WIN	IMM	WIN	IMM	ET	IN	HIGH	IN	LOW	IN	IN	WIN	IN	IMM	HIGH	IMM	IN	LOW	WIN	IN	HIGH	IN	WIN	WIN	IMM	IN	ELIM	
3–4	Waldi	IN		ET	WIN	HIGH	IMM		ET	HIGH	ET	HIGH	WIN	IMM		IN	IN	IMM	WIN	IMM	IN	IMM	HIGH	IMM	IN	LOW	LOW	IN	HIGH	LOW	LOW	IN	ELIM	
5	Carolina		IN	WIN	IMM	IN	WIN	IMM	ET	WIN	ET	IN	IN	WIN	IMM	IN	IN	IMM	ET	LOW	IN	WIN	WIN	IMM	IN	WIN	IMM	HIGH	IMM	IN	ELIM			
6	Walter		IN	ET	HIGH	IN	IN	HIGH	NET	IMM	ET	HIGH	IN	HIGH	IMM	HIGH	IMM		IN	IMM	WIN	IMM	IN	LOW	HIGH	HIGH	IMM	IN	ELIM					
7	Lizzi	IN		ET	IN	LOW	IN	IMM	ET	IN	WIN	IMM	LOW	IN	IMM	IN	IN	IN	ET	IN	LOW	HIGH	HIGH	IMM	IN	IN	ELIM							
8	Peta		IN	WIN	IMM	IN	IN	WIN	ET	IN	ET	LOW	WIN	IMM		IN	LOW	LOW	IN	IMM	LOW	LOW	LOW	ELIM										
9	Sergio		IN	ET	IN	IN	IN	LOW	ET	HIGH	ET	LOW	LOW	HIGH	IMM	IN	WIN	IMM	WIN	IMM	IN	ELIM												
10–11	Osvaldo	IN		ET	HIGH	IN	IN	IMM	WIN	IMM	ET	IN	IN	IN	HIGH	IN	LOW	HIGH	ET	ELIM														
10–11	Regina		IN	WIN	IMM	IN	IMM		WIN	IMM	ET	HIGH	LOW	IN	WIN	IN	WIN	IMM	ET	ELIM														
12	Leticia		IN	WIN	IMM	IN	IN	IMM	ET	LOW	ET	IN	LOW	LOW	LOW	IN	LOW	ELIM																
13	Negro	IN		ET	LOW	IN	IMM		NET	IMM	ET	LOW	IN	IN	ELIM																			
14	Alex		IN	WIN	IMM	IN	LOW	IN	ET	LOW	ET	ELIM																						
15	Karina		IN	WIN	IMM	IN	LOW	IN	ET	ELIM																								
16	Eduardo		IN	WIN	IMM	IN	LOW	ELIM																										
17–18	Juan		IN	ET	ELIM																													
17–18	Pablo	IN		ET	ELIM																													

Key

- Winner
- Runner-up
- Individual challenge winner
- Individual challenge top entry
- Individual challenge bottom entry
- Team challenge winner
- Team challenge loser
- Immunity
- Immunity extra
- Did not compete
- Saved last
- Eliminated
- Returned
- Withdrew
- Disqualified

== MasterChef Celebrity ==
Season	Episodes	Premiere date	Finale date	No. of Finalists	Winner	Runner-up	Judge 1	Judge 2	Judge 3
1	TBA	May 19, 2025	TBA	18	TBA	TBA	Federico Scappini	Eugenia Aquino	José Torrijos

=== First Season (2025) ===
==== Top 18 ====
(As of June 10, 2025)

Contestant	Occupation	Winnings	Finish	Place
Lourdes García	Actress	2		
Miguel "Peque" Benítez	Retired footballer	1		
Leryn Franco	Model, actress and athlete			
Albert Benítez	Comedian			
Yenny Ortega	Content creator			
Jaime Zacher	Singer	1		
Jessica Torres	Dancer and actress	1		
Bruno Sosa	Actor			
Karina Grau	Bodybuilder and nutritionist	1		
Gustavo Cabaña	Comedian			
Camila Flecha	DJ			
Mariano López	TV host and journalist			
Fátima Román	Singer			
Ramón Silva	Guaraní language professor	1		
Epifanio González	Former football referee	2		
Natalia Sosa Jovellanos	TV host and actress	1	Episode 6	16
Belén Bogado	Radio host and journalist		Episode 4	17
Ariel Delgadillo	Content creator		Episode 2	18
