= Sistema Nacional de Televisión (Paraguay) =

Paraguayan television network

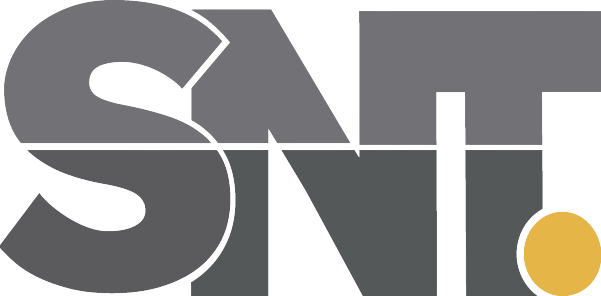
- Country: Paraguay
- Headquarters: Asunción, Paraguay

Programming
- Languages: Spanish, Guarani
- Picture format: 1080i HDTV (downscaled to 576i for the SD feed)

Ownership
- Owner: Televisora Cerro Corra S.A. (Albavisión)
- Sister channels: Paravisión, C9N, Sur Televisora Itapúa

History
- Launched: 29 September 1965 (as TV Cerro Cora)

Links
- Website: snt.com.py

Availability

Terrestrial
- Digital UHF (Paraguay): Channel 20.1 (nationwide)
- Analog VHF (Paraguay, except Asunción from 2025): See the table below

Sistema Nacional de Televisión (National Television System), simply known as SNT, is a Paraguayan television network which reaches almost the entire population of Paraguay. SNT covers almost all the Región Oriental, where approximately 97% of the population of Paraguay lives. Currently it has 16 repeaters and carries its signal on digital channel 20 nationwide.

Launched in 1965 by Carlos Moringo Delgado as Televisión Cerro Corá under the control of local politicians for much of its existence, since 1998, the channel is owned by Albavisión, one of the three main media groups operating in Paraguay, which owns three sister channels: Paravisión and two former relay stations that became independent channels in their own right, news channel C9N and regional channel Sur Televisora Itapúa. The operating company of SNT, Televisora Cerro Cora, is also a shareholder in Televideo Chile, which is one of the two companies that owns the licensee of La Red.

Most of its programming is in Spanish, however, an early morning program (Kay'uhápe, "Drinking Mate") is broadcast entirely in Guarani.

== History ==
=== Setup ===
The Paraguayan dictatorship led by Alfredo Stroessner had been studying the introduction of a television channel in the country since at least 1963. During a visit from then-president of Brazil João Goulart over the construction of the Itaipú dam, Goulart said "Will this air on Paraguayan state TV?", to which Stroessner said that there was a station, which, in reality, did not exist at the time. From this episode, Stroesser started plans to set up the country's first television station.

Another version of the same story involved Carlos Morínigo Delgado, close aide of Stroessner and founder of what would become SNT, receiving a visit from Prince Philip of the United Kingdom at Hotel Guarani, who asked the same question in March 1962. This motivated Morínigo to set up the station, after encountering Philip at Segura la Torre.

Unlike other countries, where the first television stations were set up by state companies, the service in Paraguay was being set up by a private company, which was one of the economic pillars of the regime. At the time, nobody owned a television set. Studies were being conducted abroad in Germany, France, and Argentina from September 28, 1963, with investigations and support from those countries coming to Paraguay. The company was set up by 1963 by Carlos Morinigo Delgado, with the aim of receiving help from abroad and assist in its creation. While in the Netherlands, Delgado signed an agreement with Philips to provide technical equipment.

=== Early years ===
On 30 August 1965, the first experimental signals of TV Cerro Corá were activated, with documentaries offered from foreign embassies and TV series from American distributors. On 29 September, at 7pm, the station made its official launch. The first program was the inaugural act of the channel presented by Ricardo Sanabria, where Alfredo Stroessner was present. This was followed by the first recorded item, which was about the benefits of television, narrated by Rodolfo Schaerer Peralta. The channel initially broadcast two hours a day. Its facilities were located at the Instituto de Previsión Social (IPS), one of the tallest buildings in Asunción at the time, adjacent to the area where the building's elevator machine worked. Sustained by a water tank, a tower of approximately 8 meters was erected, with an antenna on top. The station only had an ERP of 0.5kW. At the beginning, the station's canned output used telecine equipment, while commercials were just static slides. For the launch night, SNT used IPS's council meeting room, where, as of 2005, was still operational. Because the president was attending the launch, the event was simulcast on Radio Nacional del Paraguay.

Nelson García Ramírez was the station's first news presenter. At 8pm, he read the news that he had highlighted from newspaper La Tarde, and had been in Buenos Aires before to see how television stations worked. Its administrative offices were located between Independencia Nacional and 25 de Mayo, where advertising material was taken to the IPS facilities. In Charles González Paliza's first live commercial for a Philips razor, he suffered from a wound while attempting to demonstrate the product.

The first horoscope program was directed by a Paraguayan astrologer, who was removed after its first broadcast due to the difficulties the host had in speaking on camera. He was replaced by Argentine coach Héctor Moyano, who said he had studied astrology in Buenos Aires and who worked under the name Karim Gestal.

Programming at the time was mainly imported from abroad, with the daily schedule starting at 7pm and ending at midnight. The first big face of Paraguayan TV was Jacinto Herrera, who migrated from theater.

In April 1966, the station moved to a new facility. TV Cerro Cora produced a five-minute newscast in its beginnings, where the presenters read news in front of the cameras, before adding Sucesos Paraguayos, by Prisciliano Sandoval, at 9pm, and Paraguay al día (produced by Telefilm, 1968-1982), a sort of televised newsreel, with Super 8 footage, concerning mainly official acts of the government. Among initial foreign shows that were carried were Bat Masterson, Lassie, The Aquanauts and The Flintstones. That same year, videotape equipment arrived to the channel, which also enabled the broadcast of international telenovelas.

Among the first national non-news programs, the children's program Tele Nueve Club stood out, hosted by Edith Victoria, paving way for live programming. Prime time entertainment productions included The Jacinto Herrera Show which was presented by the titular actor who was having a career in Argentina; Jueves de Gala was hosted by Mercedes Jané and Mario Prono; and Buscando la letra with Carmen Maida and Rodolfo Schaerer Peralta, were some of the most popular programs. Later, the main news program Hora 20 started, airing at 8pm, hosted by Héctor Velázquez and Susana Ibáñez Rojas. In 1966, the first "live telenovela" was broadcast, which was actually a televised play: Una noche en familia, with Mario Prono, Mercedes and Stella Marys Jané and 12-year old Luis D'Oliveira.

From June 1969, the station started broadcasting at midday, with Humberto Rubín Producciones, created by the Rubín brothers (Armando, Humberto and Arturo), which combined folklore, reports and comedy segments including The Three Stooges shorts. Few people owned a television set by this period. In July 1969, the station carried the Apollo 11 moon landing. The introduction of the program implied the start of noontime broadcasts, from 12pm to 2pm.

At the beginning of its existence few people owned a television set, with viewers flocking in to households with a television set to watch movies or local comedy and sketch programs. Over time, the station gained its first 2-inch videotapes.

SNT built a new building in 1973, located at the Carlos Antonio López Park in the neighborhood of Sajonia. The location was selected in 1970, and the new facilities had a taller tower. Periodically during the dictatorship, SNT's facilities received visits from Alfredo Stroesser and his secretary Mario Abdo Benítez. Until the fall of the dictatorship in 1989, SNT was essentially a government mouthpiece. Even with the appearance of a second TV channel on channel 13 owned by a businessman with close links to the government, SNT remained in a hegemonical position. SNT was also financed by Stroessner's propaganda, even though it wasn't directly owned by the government. The station received treasury funds and had uncertainties regarding the equipment it had bought, such as filming and transmission equipment as well as outside broadcasting vans. By the mid-1970s, commercials were now shot on film, rather than being static slides.

=== Forming a network ===
The channel made its first color tests in 1978 during the World Cup held in Argentina that year, coinciding with the opening of the Aregua Satellite Earth Station, which cemented Paraguay's connections to the outside world. The satellite links also included the Spanish-produced program 300 millones, which, on one occasion, had Paraguayan guests singing in Guarani. The news operation began using portable video equipment. Gradually, by the end of the decade, SNT was making its conversion from black and white to color. Commercials were converted to color in 1980.

In 1975, SNT started working on the affiliate in Encarnación (Itapúa) on channel 7, which started the following year and in 1980, in Presidente Franco (Alto Paraná) on channel 8. The formal arrival of color television in 1979 led to an increase in the quality of the programming shown. That same year saw the arrival of Mario Ferreiro to the channel's news program Hora 20; he continued presenting news bulletins well into the 2000s. Hora 20 was fed nationwide, including in the affiliates, using Antelco's microwave network. In 1988, it carried Pope John Paul II's visit to Paraguay.

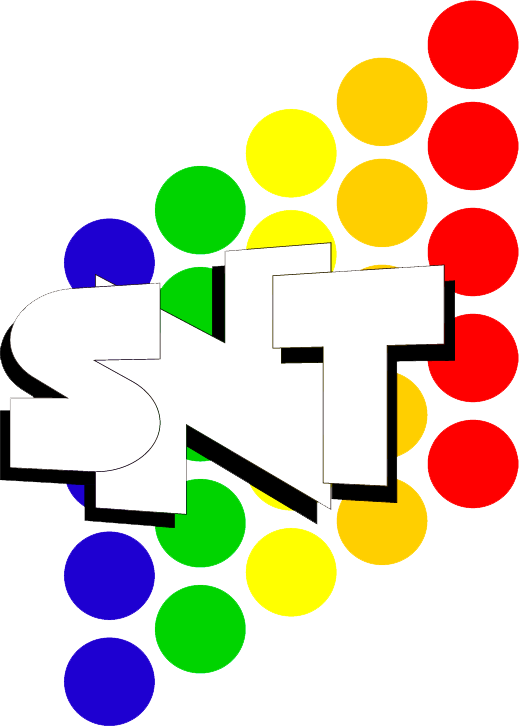
SNT's logo from 1993 to 2013.

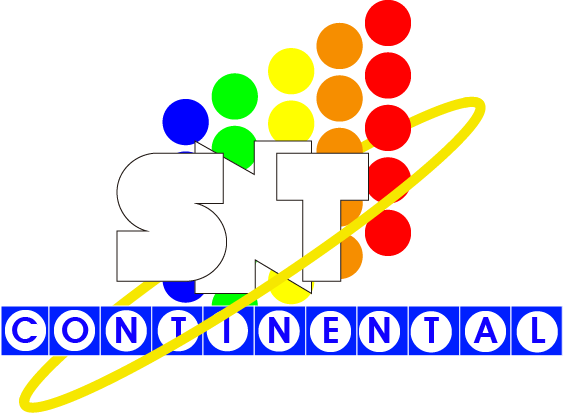
Variation of the 1993 SNT logo when the channel was branded as SNT Continental, between 1995 and 2000.

With the end of the dictatorship in 1989, network founder Carlos Morínigo Delgado mortgaged his assets and lost control of the channel. He eventually died on 17 October 1993, at the age of 83. In conjunction with the change in power, the new owner ended up becoming the family of the new president Andrés Rodríguez. SNT carried Stroessner's exile, and after the political shift, renamed its evening news program from Hora 20 to 24 Horas. La mañana de cada día also premiered around this time. In democracy, SNT's news crews were dispatched to countries such as Cuba, Russia and China, which were outlawed during the dictatorship. On June 29, 1995, the channel was renamed SNT Continental (being the first Paraguayan channel with international reach) and in the early 2000s it was renamed SNT Cerro Corá. In the 2000s, other channels were created such as Paravisión and C9N, as sister channels.

In 1995, the network premiered La venta del siglo, adapted from the American franchise Sale of the Century, produced under a barter agreement until 2000. It also aired a regional adaptation of Man O Man in 1997, produced in Argentina, which was a three-fold co-production between SNT, Canal 13 ARTEAR and SAETA TV.

A tornado knocked down SNT's transmitter on 21 March 1998 during the coverage of the 1998 Miss Paraguay pageant. None of SNT's staff was damaged. With the help of Tevedos' staff, the channel resumed its programming within less than 48 hours.

=== Under Albavisión ===
Between 1998 and 1999, the former administrations, mostly politicians, left their control over the network, ultimately selling SNT to Mexican businessman Remigio Ángel González of the Albavisión conglomerate. The sale to Albavisión also implied a massive cut in its number of journalists. In 2005, at the time the network turned 40, local programming was heavily reduced, but was open for local programming, which was subject to cost-benefit relations. The network was already in a stage of massive consolidation, in both administrative and programming vectors.

In 2003, the government demanded the dismantling of an SNT relay tower at the Carlos A. López park, over safety concerns. The 40th anniversary of the channel was marked on 29 September 2005 with a special ceremony in the channel's facilities, as well as the beginning of a special series of channel and staff memories in its morning program La mañana de cada día.

On 12 January 2011, the base of its transmitting tower was damaged by a supposedly handmade bomb, however the channel didn't interrupt its programming and nobody was made responsible for the act.

The network fired journalist Andrés Caballero on 6 January 2012, being accused of persecution by the new administration of the network.

A bomb threat affected the SNT headquarters on the morning of 23 July 2012. There was no evacuation and police investigation was underway. Said threat was later confirmed to be a false alarm.

Following the conversion of PTV and Sur TV into independent channels within the same group, SNT's Asunción feed started broadcasting in Presidente Franco and Encarnación in frequencies adjacent to the existing channels. On 12 November, an agreement was signed between SNT, Paravisión, radio stations and ABC Diario to cover the internal elections of the Colorado Party on 9 December.

In 2013, the channel adopted its current logo, with a more "solid" approach and with a logo that was less diluted in colors, as the logo used since the 90s was already deemed outdated and out of phase. SNT has been transmitting in high definition (HD) since April 2017, in a process that started with an experimental service on cable with the CONMEBOL qualifiers, which was followed by the terrestrial launch on channel 20.1.

SNT conducted its digital test broadcasts in April 2017, at a time when the network was starting plans to convert to HD. The channel picked physical channel 20.1 for its broadcasts. On 13 June 2017, it premiered Verdades Secretas.

An official app (SNT Play) featuring live streams of SNT and C9N, among other functions, was made available in September 2019. Chiche Corte, who had been with RPC in the past, rejoined SNT in January 2020, where his television career started in 1995. He joined the team of La mañana de cada día, replacing Carlos Troche.

The channel, alongside its sister outlets, started a campaign in September 2023 to broadcast the matches of the Paraguayan national football team, whose rights were with cable channel GEN. GEN on its behalf said that, unlike SNT, it had a better logistical structure and offer.

In March 2024, the station won the Top of Mind award for the most recognized TV channel in Paraguay.

MasterChef Celebrity Paraguay premiered on the channel on 19 May 2025, by initiative of independent producers Christian Chena and Gustavo Coronel.

The channel celebrated its sixtieth anniversary in September 2025; a book on its history written by Hugo Díaz and Rafael Gunsett was released in January 2026.

== Programming ==
=== News ===
- La mañana de cada día
- 24 Horas
- Pulso Urbano

=== Sports ===
- SNT Deportes

== Sports events ==
- UEFA Champions League
- Olympic Games

== Kay'uhape ==
Early morning program mainly in Guarani, talking on several general interest topics.

== Network ==
As of 2019:

City	Analog callsign	Digital callsign	Analog channel	Digital channel
Presidente Franco	ZPD 495	N/A	9	N/A
Pedro Juan Caballero	ZPD 926	ZPD 971	5	20
Asunción (main station)	ZPD 900	N/A	9	20
Mariscal Estigarribia	ZPD 679	ZPD 962	6	20
Curuquaty	ZPD 678	ZPD 961	5+	20
Salto del Guairá	ZPD 928	ZPD 973	5	20
Concepción	ZPD 927	ZPD 972	11	20
Vallemí	ZPD 983	ZPD 966	12+	20
Yby Yaú	ZPD 984	ZPD 967	13	20
Colonia Independencia	ZPD 911	ZPD 970	12	20
Encarnación	ZPD 494	ZPD 958	8	20
Maria Auxiliadora	ZPD 680	ZPD 963	10-	20
San Ignacio Misiones	ZPD 910	ZPD 969	10	20
Pilar	ZPD 909	ZPD 968	7+	20
Pozo Colorado	ZPD 682	ZPD 965	10+	20
San Estanislao	ZPD 677	ZPD 960	4-	20
Nueva Germania	ZPD 681	ZPD 964	10+	20

=== Analog-to-digital conversion ===
SNT broadcasts on physical and virtual channel 20 nationwide, instead of using its analog frequencies as virtual channels. On 31 December 2024, SNT shut down its analog signal in Asunción, in accordance with the Conatel roadmap, the first phase of the analog shutdown. On the eve of the event, SNT's Noticiero del Mediodía presented a historical retrospective of its 59-year history.

== Slogans ==
Period	Slogans
1965-September 1985	La primera televisora del Paraguay
September/October 1985	Este es el Sistema Nacional de Televisión para todo el país/Del sueño a la realidad, existen 20 años
1985-1989	Esta es la onda del Sistema, esta es la onda
1989-1990	Un show en el aire
1990-1991	25 años en el corazón de la gente
1991-1993	Imagen de un país en libertad
1993-1994	Espectacular, la nueva televisión
1994	Simplemente espectacular
1994-1995	Sensacional
1995-2000	SNT Continental, la pionera
2000-2003	La televisión independiente, sirviendo a todos
2003-2013	Televisión para todos
2013-2016	Tenemos un compromiso con el Paraguay
2016-2020	Todo el día, Toda la vida
Since 2020	El canal de todos los paraguayos

== See also ==
- Television in Paraguay
  - List of television stations in Paraguay
- Paraguay TV
