= ABC1 (disambiguation) =

ABC1 is the former name of the main television channel from the Australian Broadcasting Corporation in Australia.

ABC1 may also refer to:

- ABC1 (British and Irish TV channel), a defunct British television channel
- U.S.–British Staff Conference (ABC–1), a military plan during World War II
- ABC1, the first half of the NRS social grades used in the UK to refer to the middle classes with C2DE being the working class

== See also ==
- ABCA1, a protein which in humans is encoded by the ABCA1 gene
