= Compañía Paraguaya de Comunicaciones =

Compañía Paraguaya de Comunicaciones (COPACO), is a Paraguayan state-owned telecommunications company. It was originally founded by German interests and subsequently expropriated by the state as ANTELCO. The company was renamed in 2001.

== History ==
In 1864, under the presidency of Carlos Antonio López, the first telegraph lines were installed; in 1884, a company was set up to exploit telephone services. Up until shortly after the end of World War II, the company was private. Said company was expropriated by the state in 1947 and the new ANTELCO (Administración Nacional de Telecomunicaciones) was created. Between the 1970s and 2000, JICA was involved in assisting some of its projects.

In December 2000, the Paraguayan government decided to privatize ANTELCO with Morgan Stanley and ABN AMRO as interventors. Uruguay's Antel was also involved. In October 2001, the Paraguayan state delayed the privatization process until March 2002, alleging the "complexity of the process".

The transition from ANTELCO to COPACO was plagued by lack of human resources and lack of transparency in transferring the funds between companies.

COPACO owns the mobile telephony brand VOX, which, as of 2024, was in "technical bankruptcy". The company is financed by the Paraguayan state.
