= TV Chaqueña =

- Country: Paraguay
- Broadcast area: Paraguay
- Headquarters: Filadelfia, Paraguay

Programming
- Picture format: 1080i HDTV

Ownership
- Owner: Red Chaqueña de Comunicaciones

History
- Launched: 12 December 2006

Availability

Terrestrial
- Digital UHF (Paraguay): Channel 21.1
- Analog UHF: Channel 57 (Filadelfia)

TV Chaqueña is a Paraguayan regional commercial television station based in Filadelfia. The station is owned by Red Chaqueña de Comunicaciones, a media holding with Christian orientation, presided by pastor Juan Cruz Cellammare. The station broadcasts in Filadelfia and the neighboring area over-the-air and nationwide on certain cable operators.

== History ==
TV Chaqueña was founded on 15 September 2004 as a local filming team. The channel filmed local events and aired them on cable. Shortly afterwards, when a television license was granted to Filadelfia, the team decided to launch a full service local station to meet local interests. Full-time UHF broadcasts started in March 2007, becoming the first local television station in the Central Chaco area; relay stations in Mariscal Estigarribia and Lolita had their licenses granted in November 2008, beginning their broadcasts in September 2009. On 1 May 2009, the current Red Chaqueña de Comunicaciones holding, which includes TV Chaqueña, was founded, simultaneously, an agreement with Obedira (then-owners of Red Guaraní) was signed.

The station criticized the government's measures for the 2014 election campaign, in which local media outlets were left out. A compromise between TV Chaqueña and the local governance was reached on 19 June 2014; negotiations started as far back as December 2013 as the station was refrained from carrying certain reports in its news service.

In November 2016, national broadcasts began on Tigo Star channel 29, coinciding with the launch of new national channels.

== Network ==
As of 2019:

City	Analog callsign	Digital callsign	Analog channel	Digital channel
Filadelfia	ZPD 293	N/A	57	N/A
Neuland	ZPD 667	N/A	14	N/A
Mariscal Estigarribia	ZPD 314	N/A	43	N/A
