= Paraguay TV =

Paraguayan public TV channel

- Broadcast area: Asunción and metropolitan area
- Headquarters: Asunción, Paraguay

Programming
- Picture format: HDTV 1080i

Ownership
- Owner: SICOM (Government of Paraguay)

History
- Launched: 15 August 2011 (test broadcast); 11 December 2011 (official launch)

Availability

Terrestrial
- Digital UHF: Channel 15.1

Paraguay TV is a Paraguayan television network. It is the first television station operated by the Paraguayan government, as well as the country's first digital channel. Experimental transmissions began on 15 August 2011, and regular scheduled programming began on 11 December.

Its schedule focuses on the broadcast of state news, being the only channel in the country with more than eight hours of live programming. Currently it broadcasts in Guarani, Spanish and English.

== History ==
=== Background ===
When television was introduced to Paraguay in 1965, it was under the private initiative, even though the television channels (9 and later 13) had connections to the dictator until 1989. Paraguay was the last country in South America to open a television station owned by the government.

Shortly before the creation of SNT, João Goulart in an official visit to Paraguay told Alfredo Stroessner if Paraguay had a television station owned by the government. Stroesser said that there was such service, even though it wasn't launched yet.

Before the launch of the terrestrial public television network, the Ministry of Education and Culture set up the educational channel Arandu Rape, to cable operators, in 2009. A Paraguay-Argentine digital television production center was announced in February 2011, aiming to produce content for an all-digital public TV station, which was already on the works. On March 10, 2011, the first digital television tests took place in Asunción, with the help of NEC technicians.

=== TV Pública Paraguay (2011-2013) ===
TV Pública Paraguay was set up with foreign aid from Japan and the promise of being independent and impartial, as a public broadcaster that served the citizens and not the Executive Power, reiterating the fact that it had no links to the government. The channel was scheduled to launch on August 15 and was studying options for a terrestrial frequency on the UHF band in Asunción, in both analog and digital formats. At the time, there was no clear law for a public television station. The network was negotiating with Manuel Cuenca, who had left SNT due to a scandal the previous month, to present programs for the channel.

As part of the celebrations for the Bicentennial of the Independence of Paraguay, on May 14, 2011, the new Paraguayan state channel called "TV Pública Paraguay" was inaugurated; technologically being the most modern channel in the country, and with the aim of introducing digital terrestrial television broadcasts, using the Japanese ISDB-T standard. The station broadcast from a building owned by Copaco, the state telecommunications company. The inauguration consisted of the first step for the launch of the television project that aired on August 15 of that same year. Between August 15 and December 11 of that same year, it maintained a provisional schedule, airing promotional spots. Once the channel would start broadcasting programs, it would be from 6pm to midnight. Terrestrial coverage was limited to Asunción, on analog channel 14 and digital channel 15, both UHF, as well as on channel 2 on Cablevisión's network. The terrestrial signal reached 25 kilometers in its digital signal and 60 kilometers in its analog signal. The launch campaign was also broadcast on other channels on August 15, 2011 (the channel's launch day) at 7:56pm. The network hired chef Santiago Montañéz in August, who would return to television after eight years absent, presenting a cooking show, La Cacerola, with an October 3 premiere date. Manuel Cuenca's Fronteras was announced with recording taking place in September and premiering in October. The program would also be seen on affiliates of the Televisión América Latina network of public broadcasters. On October 29 of the same year, it had its first official broadcast, with live and direct monitoring of the XXI Ibero-American Summit held in Asunción (Paraguay), which could be seen on analog channel 14 and digital channel 14.1 and for the whole world through its Intelsat satellite.

On December 10, 2011, the second day of the meeting of State Communicators (ECOE), began with the presentation of the channel's schedule, and also announced that it will go on air with its official broadcast starting on Monday, 12 December of that year. That day, the station presented its first program, Pueblos orignarios, at 7pm. The daily schedule consisted of 4 1/2 hours of programming on weekdays (7pm to 11:30pm) and 17 on weekends (7am to 12am). In the initial phase, 24 programs were broadcast, 17 being national and 7 from other Latin American countries. Almost the entirety of the weekend line-up consisted of repeats of programs already broadcast on weeknights. The channel would gradually increase its programming offer.

Paraguay TV premiered an investigation program on June 5, 2012, La mano en el fuego. On June 7, NHK donated the station with an outside broadcast van, dubbed "Akira" in homage to Akira Kurosawa.

Marcelo Martinessi renounced from his position as president of TV Pública Paraguay on June 22, 2012. In the outcome of this event, a large protest took place outside the station's headquarters, whose claims demanded that the station would serve the people instead of the government. The government appointed Gustavo Canata as the interim director on June 23, while on June 24, the station was taken off the air for a period of 26 minutes due to programmed power cuts in the area where the headquarters were located, which was denounced as an act of censorship. On June 28, Judith Vera was appointed as the new interim director to end the strike. The effects of the strike at TV Pública Paraguay caused massive concern in the area, with disruptions in classes and windows broken by protesters. On August 23, lawyer Cristian Turrini was appointed the new director of programs.

Documentaries from Discovery Channel dubbed to the Guarani language were set to premiere on October 15, 2012. That same day, a newscast and a morning program were also scheduled to premiere, but were delayed due to obstacles in planning. These documentaries premiered on November 5.

In early November 2012, it was announced that TV Pública Paraguay would be renamed TV Nacional del Paraguay. Sports journalist Julio González Cabello was hired to present a nightly program. The plan to rename the channel was faced with some criticism. Former Minister of Communications Augusto dos Santos believed that the new name's rationale had "limited reflection" and that the rename was due to political concerns.

The channel introduced new programs on December 13, 2012, one year after the launch of the channel's regular broadcasts. It also aired the 2013 South American Youth Football Championship held in Argentina early next year.

For June 2013, three new foreign series were added, Max Steel, Monsuno and Mr. Bean. New national programs were also premiering in the months before, but the channel was pending government funding to continue doing so. At the same time, it was announced that the station, as well as the whole of the government's media outlets, were to move to the building formerly occupied by Cañas Paraguayas S.A., which had been transferred to the Paraguayan state.

=== Paraguay TV (2013-present) ===
On August 28, 2013, after the passing of a new government decree which modified an article in the decree that created TV Pública Paraguay, the network changed its name to Paraguay TV. The new name sought to strengthen the name Paraguay across all state media outlets. Paraguay TV also sought to strengthen its public image by being the only HD channel in Paraguay at the time. In October, the channel unveiled its new corporate campaign: Los ojos de un país (the eyes of a country).

Paraguay TV's signal was cut from November 28, 2013, to the morning of November 29, 2013, due to intense rain in Asunción, and water leaks in the station's headquarters.

In January 2014, Larissa Giménez Guillén became the new director of the channel. She had prior experience in the United States at Telemundo and Univisión and, in Paraguay, on Channel 13. Guillén pledge to expand the network's reach by means of partnerships between public and private companies. Anticipating moves from the private sector to launch an all-news channel, Paraguay TV started offering an eight-hour morning news block from 5:30am to 1:30pm in March 2014. During the visit of the Paraguayan president to Japan, a cultural exchange agreement was signed in Tokyo on June 25, 2014. In September 2014, it added Explosión MMA TV, with mixed martial arts fights. On November 11, 2014, it signed an agreement with TUVES Paraguay, whose service was branded as Personal TV.

The Japanese government donated a package of educational programs to Paraguay TV in May 2015. From June 10 that year, the channel was made available on Claro TV, at a national scale.

On October 9, 2015, Paraguay TV aired a livestock auction after the main news. Guillén had connections to the rural sector, justifying such a broadcast.

In December 2015, the state television station Paraguay TV was in charge of generating the signal and clean images freely and freely available for the XLIX Mercosur Summit for all national and international television media from the Confederation Convention Center. The year ended with the channel being received by two million viewers, having increased its daily number of news hours from three to twelve. That same month, it announced that it would install a relay station in Alto Paraná, with transmitting equipment provided by a Korean company. The move coincided with the fiftieth anniversary of mass Korean immigration to Paraguay.

On May 24, 2016, Paraguay TV officially announced that it would be the only over-the-air channel to broadcast all the Copa América Centenario matches, from different cities in the United States. The signal was generated by Unicanal, which gave the broadcasting rights of the matches to Paraguay TV. The terrestrial coverage of the channel was still limited at the time, prompting concerns and complaints from viewers on social media outside of the coverage area, in the regions of Central and Alto Paraná. At the time, Unicanal was still a cable channel.

In December 2016 and January 2017, in co-production with Telefuturo, the state channel was the Official Dakar Rally Channel, being the only Paraguayan channel to offer more than 100 hours of screen space dedicated exclusively to the competition. On August 21, 2017, Paraguay TV started HD broadcasts on the Tigo platform. The channel became the fourth over-the-air channel to do so (after the three largest commercial channels, SNT, RPC and Telefuturo), and sixth overall including cable channels Unicanal and Noticias PY, both of which later became OTA networks.

In July–August 2017, the channel aired a cycle of Russian movies, provided by the Russian embassy in Paraguay. A total of five movies were broadcast, one per week.

Since October 13, 2017, the channel was available on Argentina's digital terrestrial television platform on channel 22.3 nationwide through the state-owned public company Radio y Televisión Argentina SE, under an agreement between the governments of both countries. Unlike the signal available in Paraguay Within the Argentine platform, the channel broadcast in the 4: 3 aspect ratio through pan and scan, which represents a loss of image since the lateral ends are cut off so that it can fit on cathode ray tube television sets.

In March 2018, the network broadcast an animated series dubbed in Guaraní for the first time, the 2013 Franco-Indian series The New Adventures of Peter Pan, whose primary aim was to bring Guaraní to child audiences.

Since mid-July 2018, the signal relay tower in the city near Asunción, San Lorenzo, was activated on channel 15 UHF virtual 32.2 and 32.3, causing great interference throughout the capital because it interfered with the Asunción signal. which in the same way transmits on virtual UHF channel 15 15.1 and 15.2 on DTT in that country.

On August 14, 2018, the signal ceased its broadcasts on the TDA Argentina platform, leaving its place vacant and for 9 months, the channel was replaced by Mirador.

A rebrand of the identity not only of Paraguay TV, but also all of the state media outlets, was announced in March 2019. With this, the channel was positioned as a "total information" platform, with over 12 hours of news and current affairs programming daily. Priority was initially given to a restructuring of the morning schedule, whereas from April, afternoons were going to be dedicated to family, students and society.

The channel was added to Flow Paraguay's satellite service in December 2019.

Between October 1–15, 2022, it was the only Paraguayan channel to air the 2022 South American Games live.

The ceremony of the new president of Paraguay in August 2023 was broadcast entirely in Guaraní.

On March 15, 2024, it was reported that on the night of March 14, the channel went off the air due to failures in the uninterruptible power supply. The channel's website was also broken. In addition, it was added that this system would have exploded, so the entire electrical system from the generator to the channel does not perform the automatic function, leaving it without energy. According to officials from the channel, the system is "old" and, according to the Vice Minister of Communication, Alejandra Duarte Albospino, "there is no budget to acquire a new one."

== Technical information ==
Paraguay TV has been an all-digital television network since its beginning in 2011, using physical channel 15.1 instead of virtual channel 14.1.

SICOM, the licensee of Paraguay TV, only had one analog television station, its head station in Asunción, on channel 15, under the callsign ZPD 669. Its signal switched off on December 31, 2024, the first phase of the analog shutdown roadmap; Paraguay TV only had digital signals outside of Asunción, meaning that the network closed its analog transmissions.

== See also ==
- Television in Paraguay
  - List of television stations in Paraguay
