= ABC Television (Nepal) =

Nepali television channel

ABC TV Nepal
- Country: Nepal
- Broadcast area: Nepal
- Headquarters: Kathmandu, Nepal

Ownership
- Owner: A.B.C. Television Pvt. Ltd.

History
- Launched: 2008

Links
- Website: abcnepal.tv

ABC Television (Nepali: एबीसी टेलिभिजन) is a Nepali television channel established in 2008. A news channel, headquartered in Kathmandu, broadcasts in the Nepali language.

The chairman and Editor-In-Chief is Shubha Shankar Kandel, who also hosts the talk show "Outlook" on Saturday nights. He is the author of more than a dozen media and political books. Kandel is the President of Nepal Media Society (NMS).

ABC Media Group Pvt. Ltd. runs ABC Television. The channel covers a wide range of societal issues, especially those affecting marginalized people and communities. It has reporters in all major cities.

== See also ==
- ABC Television (disambiguation)
- List of Nepali television stations
