= Scuola Italiana Dante Alighieri =

Colegio Dante Alighieri
- Scuola Italiana Dante Alighieri

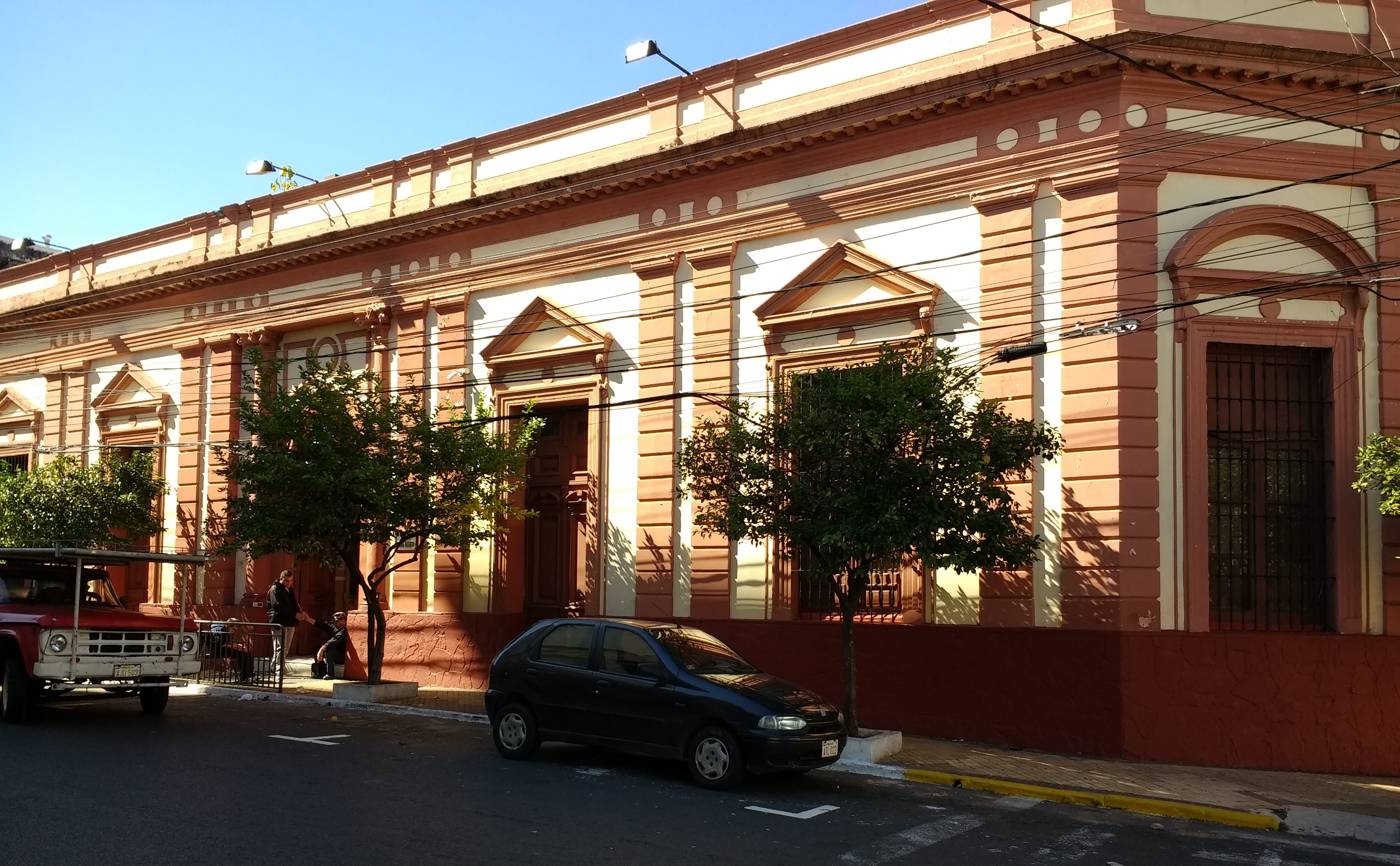

Location
- Alberdi and Humaitá; Asunción, Paraguay; 25°17′06″S 57°38′17″W

Information
- Type: Private
- Established: March 14, 1895; 131 years ago
- President: Viviana Ruggero Laurino
- Grades: KG–12
- Website: www.dante.edu.py

Scuola Italiana Dante Alighieri, better known as Colegio Dante Alighieri, is a traditional, and one of the oldest, Italian private school in Paraguay. The school is named after the famous Italian poet, Dante Alighieri.

== History ==
The school was founded in March 1895 when two Italian societies in Asunción (Società Italiana di Mutuo Soccorso and Società Femminile di Beneficienza Margherita di Savoia) decided to create a school for their descendants in the downtown area of Asunción, in the streets of 15 de Agosto and Estrella. The school was recognized by the Ministry of Education in 1909, and in 1929 the school moved to its current location in the streets of Alberdi and Humaitá, in the neighbourhood of La Encarnación. In 1981 the school inaugurated a second campus in the city of Fernando de la Mora.

== Education ==
The school offers education levels from kindergarten through grade 12 with bilingual education in Spanish and Italian.

== See also ==
- Lists of high schools in Paraguay
