= Sajonia =

Coordinates: 25°18′S 57°40′W

Sajonia is a barrio (neighbourhood) of Asunción, the capital of Paraguay. It is located next to the Paraguay River and has a population of 14,873 people. This barrio is home to different social classes, but most predominantly middle- to upper-class families. The Carlos Antonio López Avenue runs through Sajonia.

Some important sites in this barrio are the Port of Sajonia, the Club Deportivo Sajonia (a social and sports club), the Spanish Hospital, the Navy Club and the Defensores del Chaco stadium, which is used mostly for football (soccer) games but it is also used for other activities such as rock concerts.
