= Paravisión =

Paraguayan television channel

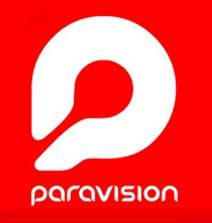
- Country: Paraguay
- Broadcast area: Paraguay
- Headquarters: Asunción

Programming
- Picture format: 1080i HDTV
- Timeshift service: ZPV-975 TV Canal 5

Ownership
- Owner: SNT (Albavisión)
- Sister channels: SNT, C9N, Sur Televisora Itapúa

History
- Launched: 7 October 2004; 21 years ago

Links
- Website: www.paravision.com.py

Availability

Terrestrial
- Digital UHF: Channel 19.1 (HD)
- Analog VHF: Channel 5 (Asunción, listings may vary)

Paravisión, sometimes known as Canal 5, is a Paraguayan free-to-air television channel owned by Albavisión which broadcasts news programs, sports, entertainment, imported TV shows, among others.

It is available on DTT in the capital city of Asunción, broadcasting on UHF channel 19 (or virtual channel 19.1) since September 2018.

== History ==
In its early months, Paravisión was operating with irregularities due to the lack of transparency from the owners, including the questionable sale of the frequency to two SNT executives. The channel initially broadcast from premises in Villa Morra, where in 2007 it had a staff of seven. By the late 2000s it had increased its coverage to all of the major urban centers. The network broadcast on the VHF band nationwide except in Encarnación where it was broadcast on a UHF frequency (14). The offices received a bomb threat on 1 October 2012. The channel relocated its offices to the Sajonia neighborhood in 2013, where its sister channel SNT is located. By then, the staff had increased to 80.
