= Santiago Peña =

President of Paraguay from 2023 to 2026

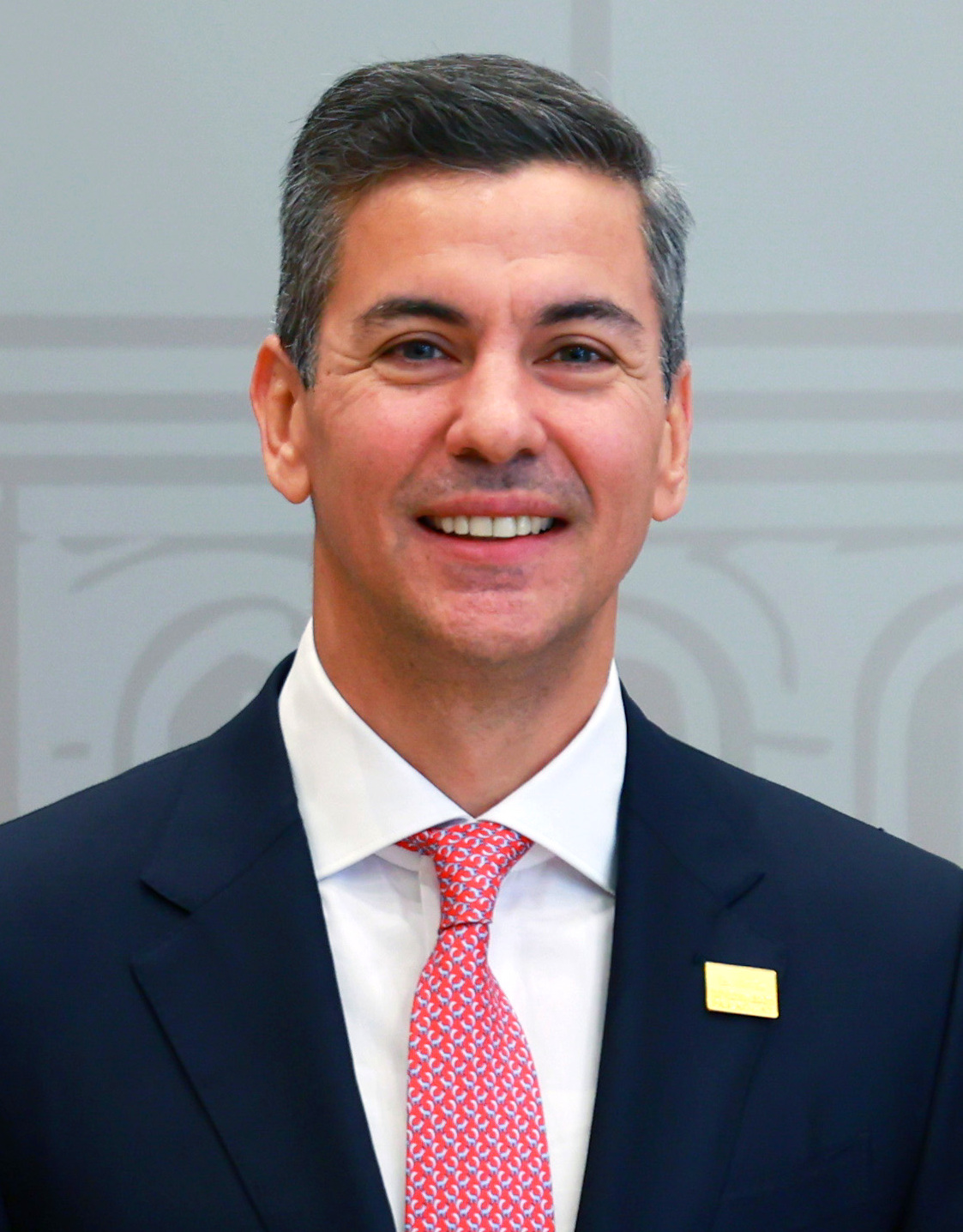
- Peña in 2026

52nd President of Paraguay
- In office 15 August 2023 – 6 November 2026
- Vice President: Pedro Alliana
- Preceded by: Mario Abdo Benítez
- Succeeded by: Pedro Alliana

President pro tempore of Mercosur
- In office 20 December 2025 – 1 July 2026
- Preceded by: Luiz Inácio Lula da Silva
- Succeeded by: Yamandú Orsi
- In office 7 December 2023 – 7 July 2024
- Preceded by: Luiz Inácio Lula da Silva
- Succeeded by: Luis Lacalle Pou

Minister of Finance
- In office 5 January 2015 – 5 June 2017
- President: Horacio Cartes
- Preceded by: Germán Rojas
- Succeeded by: Lea Giménez

Personal details
- Born: Santiago Peña Palacios; 16 November 1978 (age 48) Asunción, Paraguay
- Party: Independent
- Other political affiliations: PLRA (1996–2016); Colorado (2016–2026)
- Spouse: Leticia Ocampos (m. 1997)
- Children: 2
- Education: Catholic University of Asunción; Columbia University (MPA)
- Profession: Politician; economist
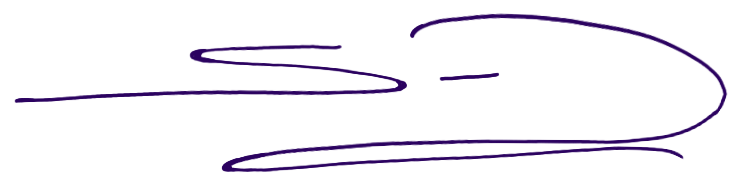
- Signature

Santiago Peña Palacios (Note: Latin American Spanish pronunciation: [sanˈtjaɣo ˈpeɲa paˈlasjos]) (born 16 November 1978) is a Paraguayan politician and economist who served as the 52nd president of Paraguay from 2023 until his arrest, dismissal, and prosecution in 2026. Peña served on leadership boards for the Central Bank of Paraguay and Banco Amambay. He taught economics at the Catholic University of Asunción.

Peña is a former member of the Board of Directors of the Central Bank of Paraguay, and former minister of Finance of Paraguay. He was a member of the Authentic Radical Liberal Party beginning in 1996, until 2016 when he joined the conservative Colorado Party. He stood as a candidate in the Colorado Party's presidential primary in 2018, where he lost to Mario Abdo Benítez, who went on to be elected president in the 2018 general election. He later won the party's nomination for president in the 2023 general election, in which he ultimately won.

His government combined economic orthodoxy, social conservatism summed up in the formula "pro-life and pro-family," and a close alignment with the United States.

Following the political and financial crisis originating after the collapse of Ueno Bank, Peña submitted his resignation on 5 November 2026. Congress failed to approve it, as the legislators of the governing party withdrew from the joint session, depriving it of a quorum. Hence, Peña still held the office of president. Later that day, the Chamber of Deputies approved the impeachment charges against him—the Senate began the trial and his defence was scheduled for 6 November 2026. On the same day, he was unanimously removed from office, convicted and placed under house arrest, with vice president Pedro Alliana succeeding him as president.

== Early life ==
Peña was born on 16 November 1978 in Asunción, Paraguay to José María Peña Nieto (a Paraguayan) and Ana María Palacios (an Argentine from Buenos Aires). He has two brothers: Manuel and Francisco Peña. Through his father's side he is a descendant of former dictator José Gaspar Rodríguez de Francia, considered to be Paraguay's founding father.

== Education ==
Peña earned a graduate degree from the Universidad Católica Nuestra Señora de la Asunción in 2001 and a Master of Public Administration in economic policy management from Columbia University School of International and Public Affairs in 2003.

== Academia ==
In 2004, Peña taught financial theory as an adjunct professor at the Catholic University of Asunción. In 2005, he became a professor of economic policy at the same institution. In addition, Peña has contributed to scholarship on monetary policy and finance. In 2017, he was invited by Roberto Izurieta to participate as a visiting professor at the Graduate School of Political Management of the George Washington University in Washington D.C., where Peña shared his experience on public administration in Paraguay. He also was the thesis advisor of Geovanny Vicente, CNN columnist and professor at Columbia University.

== Early career, Minister of Finance, and first presidential run (1999–2018) ==
Peña joined the Industrial Development Fund as an analyst in 1999 and served as an economist at the Central Bank of Paraguay from 2000 to 2009.

He was appointed as one of the four directors of the Central Bank of Paraguay in 2012, leaving his job at the IMF.

=== Ministry of Finance ===
Horacio Cartes picked Peña to replace Germán Rojas as finance minister in 2015, following Rojas's resignation on personal grounds. As Peña took office, Cartes described him as a "bright young man" who would reinvigorate Paraguay's economy in the face of low global soy prices and a slow regional export market.

As Minister of Finance in 2016 and 2017, Peña promoted the project to create the Superintendency of Retirements and Pensions.

Peña indicated, "There have already been situations of embezzlement with the case of the Pension Fund of the Binational Itaipú (Cajubi)."

The Itaipu Retirement and Pension Fund (Cajubi) and the Itaipu Workers' Union (STEIBI) opposed the project. In a joint press conference in November 2016, the two groups stated that they saw the plan as an "unconstitutional" violation, further describing the proposed legislation as "an imminent danger from a greedy person, who is looking for ways to extract money from people and who is the Minister of Finance."

On 17 May 2018, Cajubi's director and legal advisor, Adelio Dolores Aquino, presented Cajubi's position against the creation of a Superintendency on the TV Unicanal's program Sin Vueltas.

As President, Peña continued to advocate for the creation of the Superintendency of Retirement and Pensions, arguing that it was necessary to prevent problems like the Cajubi case. "At some point, we will probably also have to pay for the embezzlement of the Itaipu Retirement Fund (Cajubi), which is another case, and that's because there isn't a public entity that is constitutionally obligated to do so," he stated.

On 14 December 2023, Peña enacted Law 7253/23, creating the Superintendency of Retirements and Pensions in Paraguay.

==== Joining the Colorado Party ====
Peña joined the conservative Colorado Party on 29 October 2016, having previously been a member of the Authentic Radical Liberal Party (PLRA) for 20 years since joining at the age of 17. Peña's membership in the Colorado Party caused controversy, with reports that he only joined the party after Horacio Cartes announced his intention to dismiss members of his cabinet who were not party members. Peña released a statement stating he had joined the party due to its focus on developing Paraguay, and claimed to be the descendent of one of the party's founders, Jaime Peña. Following this, an electoral court annulled Peña's membership to the PLRA.

=== 2018 presidential election ===
In 2017, Peña ran for the Colorado Party's presidential candidacy in the 2018 general election, ultimately losing out to Mario Abdo Benítez, with Abdo Benítez winning 564,811 votes (50.93%) to Peña's 480,114 (43.29%).

Following his defeat in the Colorado Party's internal elections in 2017, Peña was elected to the board of Banco Amambay in March 2018. The bank was part of the Cartes Group, which was owned by former President of Paraguay Horacio Cartes, for whom Peña had served as minister of finance.

== Presidency (2023–2026) ==
=== Overview ===
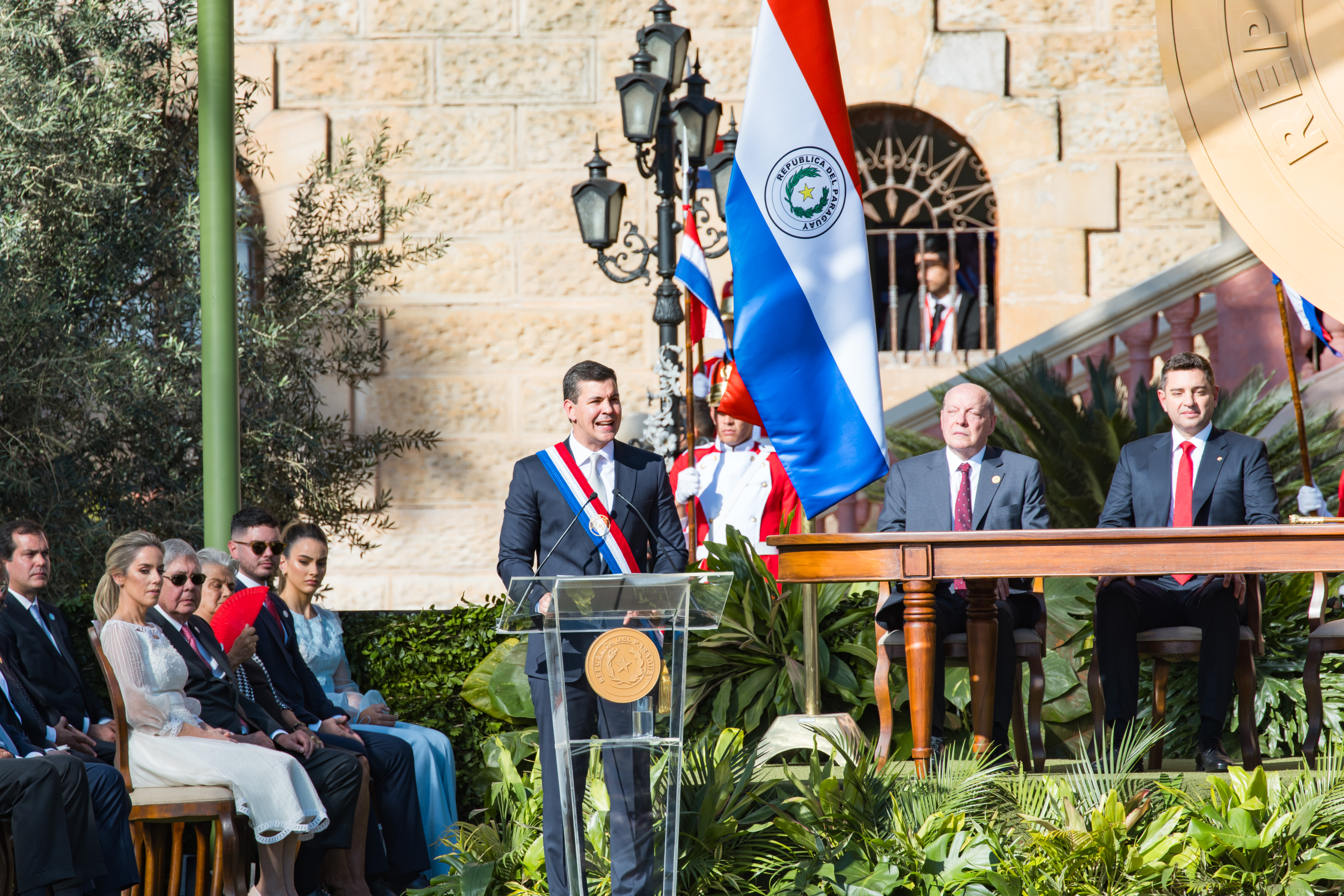
Peña on his inauguration speech on 15 August 2023

In 2022, Peña ran successfully to stand as the Colorado Party's presidential candidate; he was widely seen as the candidate most closely aligned to former president Horacio Cartes, while his opponent, Arnoldo Wiens, was aligned with Abdo Benítez. Critics of Peña have said that if elected president, Horacio Cartes would be a grey eminence and that Peña would merely act as a mouthpiece for Cartes, who is sanctioned by the U.S. as "significantly corrupt". Colorado Party politician Blanca Ovelar said Peña would end up acting as a "secretary" to Cartes if he was elected. Cartes and his supporters in Congress had previously attempted to pass a constitutional amendment to allow Cartes to run for re-election, sparking riots in the country.

Peña was elected President of the Republic of Paraguay, after winning 43.9% of the vote in the 2023 general election in April, defeating his closest rival Efraín Alegre by a difference of 15 percentage points. He was congratulated by outgoing president Mario Abdo Benítez, and presidents Luiz Inácio Lula da Silva of Brazil and Alberto Fernández of Argentina. Peña called for unity to address the economic challenges the country is currently facing. Peña was inaugurated on 15 August 2023. At 44 years old, he became Paraguay's youngest president since the restoration of democracy in 1989, surpassing Abdo Benítez, who was 46 when he assumed the role in 2018.

On 28 September 2025, protests began in Paraguay against Peña's government. Commonly described by the media as part of the Gen Z protests, they are the first mass-scale protests in the country since 2021, with the protests being inspired by the 2025 Peruvian protests.

Peña's government maintained close ties with UENO Bank S.A., a major digital lender. In November 2026, after increasing regulator scrutiny of the bank, it was found to have misdocumented its finances to the point where it was insolvent. On 3 November, Ueno Bank was ordered into resolution, and Central Bank head Carlos Carvallo—appointed by Peña, and former leader of bank's predecessor, Financiera ueno—resigned at Peña's request. On 5 November, Peña himself resigned as president; minutes later, he was unanimously impeached by the Chamber of Deputies. Lawmakers cited “conflicts of interest, regulatory manipulation, exceeding credit limits, personal enrichment, and undermining confidence in the financial system” as grounds for the impeachment. That next day the Senate voted unanimously to convict Peña, thus removing him from office. By impeaching Peña instead of accepting his resignation, the legislature stripped him of the immunity usually granted to former presidents and he was placed under house arrest pending criminal charges related to the bank's collapse.

=== Formation of the government ===
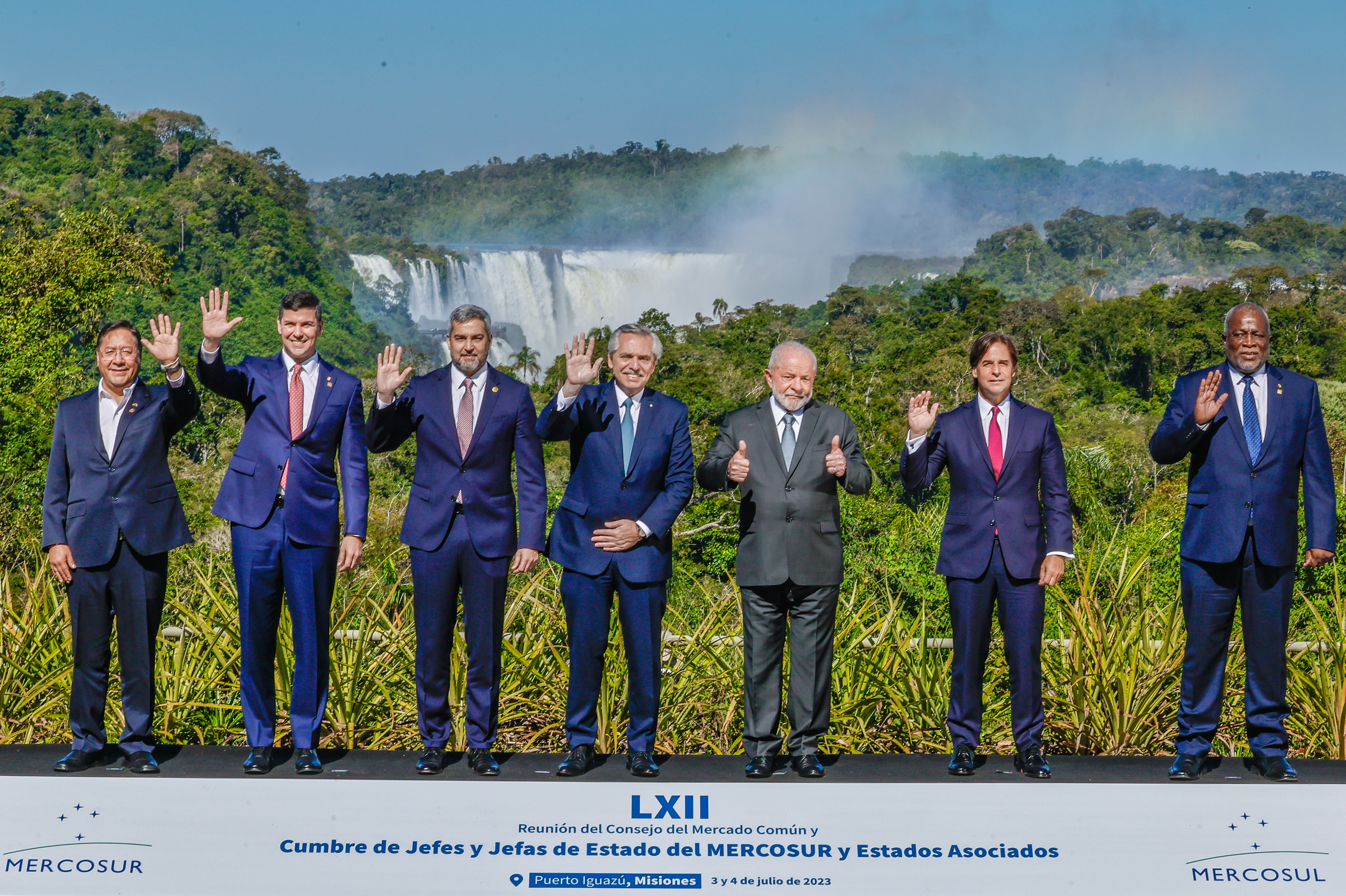
Peña and Abdo Benítez (second and third from the left) at the Mercosur summit in Puerto Iguazú (Argentina), in July 2023.

The government of Santiago Peña began on 15 August 2023 following his election as President of Paraguay. He was sworn in as president at the age of 44, becoming the youngest president of Paraguay since the restoration of democracy in 1989, surpassing Mario Abdo Benítez, who was 46 years old at the time of his inauguration. In the first days of his term, administrative reforms aimed at the reorganization of the executive branch and the centralization of state functions were promoted. One of the main changes was the creation of the Ministry of Economy and Finance, enacted on 23 August 2023. This new ministry absorbed the functions of the defunct Ministry of Finance, the Technical Secretariat for Economic and Social Development Planning (STP), and the Secretariat of the Civil Service (SFP). Carlos Fernández Valdovinos was appointed as the first minister of this institution. Likewise, the National Directorate of Tax Revenue (DNIT) was established through the merger of the Undersecretariat of State for Taxation (SET) and the National Customs Directorate (DNA).

As for the binational entities and other key institutions, Justo Zacarías Irún was appointed acting general director of Itaipu Binacional, while Luis Federico Benítez Cuevas assumed office as acting director of the Yacyretá Binational Entity (EBY). At the National Development Bank (BNF), the presidency was assigned to Manuel Ochipinti. For her part, Liliana Alcaraz was appointed minister of the Secretariat for the Prevention of Money or Asset Laundering (Seprelad).

==== Presidential cabinet ====
Peña has stated his intention for his cabinet to be composed entirely or mostly of members of the Colorado Party. The president, vice president, and the other members of the cabinet took office on 15 August 2023.

Ministries and Secretariats of the Government of Santiago Peña				
Portfolio	Officeholder	Profession	Term	Ref.
Chief of Cabinet	Lea Giménez	Economist	15 August 2023 – 12 August 2024	
Ministry of the Interior	Enrique Riera Escudero	Lawyer	15 August 2023 –	
Ministry of Economy and Finance	Carlos Gustavo Fernández Valdovinos	Economist	15 August 2023 – 2026	
Ministry of Foreign Affairs	Rubén Ramírez Lezcano	Economist and diplomat	15 August 2013 –	
Ministry of Public Health and Social Welfare	María Teresa Barán	Family physician and public health specialist	15 August 2023 –	
Ministry of Women	Cynthia Figueredo	Public accountant	15 August 2023 –	
Ministry of Justice	Ángel Ramón Barchini	Lawyer and notary	15 August 2023 –	
Ministry of Labor, Employment and Social Security	Mónica Recalde	Lawyer	15 August 2023 –	
Ministry of Public Works and Communications	Claudia Centurión	Civil engineer	15 August 2023 –	
Ministry of Agriculture and Livestock	Carlos Alcibiades Giménez Díaz	Veterinarian	15 August 2023 –	
Ministry of Industry and Commerce	Javier Giménez García de Zúñiga	Business administrator	15 August 2023 –	
Ministry of National Defense	Óscar González	Army general	15 August 2023 –	
Ministry of Education and Sciences	Luis Fernando Ramírez	Sociologist	15 August 2023 –	
Ministry of Social Development	Miguel Tadeo Rojas	Business administrator	15 August 2023 –	
Ministry of Environment and Sustainable Development	Rolando de Barros Barreto Acha	Forest engineer	15 August 2023 –	
Ministry of Urban Planning, Housing and Habitat	Juan Carlos Baruja	Civil engineer	15 August 2023 –	
Ministry of Information and Communication Technologies	Gustavo Villate	Technology entrepreneur	15 August 2023 –	
Ministry of Childhood and Adolescence	Walter Gutiérrez Cabrera	Lawyer	15 August 2023 –	
National Sports Secretariat	César Ramírez Caje	Former footballer	15 August 2023 –	
National Tourism Secretariat	Angie Duarte de Melillo	Graduate in marketing and administration	16 August 2023 –	
National Secretariat of Culture	Adriana Ortiz Semidei	Psychologist and fashion designer	15 August 2023 –	
National Secretariat for the Human Rights of Persons with Disabilities	Yody Marlene Ledesma		15 August 2023 –	
National Youth Secretariat	Florencia Taboada Evreinoff	International relations specialist and economist	15 August 2023 –	
National Anti-Drug Secretariat	Jalil Rachid	Lawyer and prosecutor	15 August 2023 –	
National Intelligence Secretariat	Marco Alcaraz	Lawyer and prosecutor	15 August 2023 –	

=== Domestic policy ===
Peña has expressed his preference for a "small state", focused on providing security, public health, and education, leaving the rest to the private sector.

==== Education ====
In February 2022, before assuming the presidency, Peña emphasized the need to turn government plans into state policies, especially in education and health. He proposed beginning a process of educational transformation in Paraguay, focusing on improving human capital as an engine of progress.

Carlos Giménez, Paraguay's minister of agriculture and livestock, stated in late February 2024 his opposition to the admission of people with "homosexual tendencies" to agricultural schools. He later apologized for "the interpretation of his statements". Santiago Peña regretted the remarks but kept him in office, without imposing sanctions.

In April 2024, Peña enacted the "Zero Hunger in Schools" law, passed by the Congress, a program that seeks to guarantee food for students in the country's public educational institutions. According to the newspaper ABC Color, the program excluded hundreds of children from special schools and inclusion support centers, leaving them without food. The Ministry of Education and Sciences (MEC) acknowledged the situation and proposed reviewing and correcting the scope of the program.

During the start of the school year in February 2025, Peña acknowledged deficiencies in school infrastructure, committing himself to improving the physical conditions of educational institutions to facilitate an adequate learning environment. He announced the construction of seventeen "large schools" in different regions of the country, intended to offer high-quality education and modern equipment, seeking to reduce school dropout and improve learning indicators. Peña expressed enthusiasm for this project and acknowledged that there were still challenges to overcome in the national education system.

In March 2025, the president highlighted the historic delivery of 430,000 school furniture items as part of the strengthening of the education system and the improvement of learning conditions. He announced the expansion of places for government scholarships, benefiting more students who passed the tests and met the established requirements.

==== Social policies and human rights ====
===== Transparency and access to public information =====
At the beginning of May 2024, Peña signed decree No. 1604, partially objecting to bill No. 7257, which amended Law No. 5282/2014 on access to public information. The veto focused on subsection "g" of article 10, which proposed the disclosure of sensitive data, such as beneficiaries of public land and government transactions. The executive argued that such publication violated the right to privacy and statistical secrecy, constituting a threat to citizens' fundamental rights. The bill was returned to the Senate for reconsideration.

===== Mass media and freedom of the press =====
During the government of Santiago Peña, the situation of the mass media and freedom of the press in Paraguay worsened, according to the Chapultepec Index of the Inter American Press Association (SIP). In 2023, Paraguay fell to position #10 in the freedom of speech ranking in Latin America, a drop from position #8 the previous year. This change led the country to be classified as "restricted" in terms of freedom of the press, instead of "low restriction".

Santiago Peña has been questioned by sectors of the press, especially by ABC Color, due to alleged conflicts of interest and use of public assets. On several occasions he responded critically, accusing media outlets of extortion and manipulation. After revelations about his stake in Ueno Holding, a company benefited during his government, he announced in April 2025 the sale of his shares. Although he signed the Declaration of Chapultepec, his relationship with the press has been tense.

==== Security and justice ====
In August 2024, Peña announced an investment of 500 million dollars to strengthen Paraguay's security and defense, with the aim of improving the operational capacity of the armed forces and the country's police forces.

On 3 December 2024, President Santiago Peña enacted Law No. 7389, establishing the "National Regime of Integrity, Transparency and Prevention of Corruption" and creating the National Anti-Corruption Council, replacing the National Anti-Corruption Secretariat. This law was presented as progress in the fight against corruption in Paraguay. However, its implementation has been questioned due to the exclusion of binational entities, such as Itaipu, from oversight by bodies such as the National Directorate of Public Procurement (DNCP) and the Office of the Comptroller General of the Republic (CGR). The lack of oversight over tenders, especially in cases of alleged overbilling in the purchase of school desks and ambulances, has generated complaints of corruption and bid rigging. In addition, the amendment of Law No. 7089 on conflicts of interest, which removed restrictions on officials owning shares in companies that operate with the state, has also been controversial. A report by the United States Department of State criticized the "rampant corruption" and lack of legal certainty in the country, making foreign investment more difficult and highlighting that much remained to be done in terms of combating impunity.

In April 2025, Peña signed Decree No. 3749, regulating Law No. 7027/2022, which raises to ₲ 7000 million the reward for information on the whereabouts of the kidnapped citizens Edelio Morínigo, Félix Urbieta, and Óscar Denis. The decree authorizes the Ministry of the Interior to make partial or total payments, depending on the quality and truthfulness of the information, through confidential funds. The rule establishes that any citizen may provide useful information, except public officials of security and justice institutions, or their relatives up to the fifth degree of consanguinity. Confidentiality of sources is guaranteed, and false information is to be reported to the Public Ministry.

==== Infrastructure and public works ====
On 10 May 2025, the Valenzuela 500 kV Interconnection Substation, considered the largest in the Paraguayan electrical system, was inaugurated. The project, carried out by the National Electricity Administration (ANDE), benefits approximately 770,000 users in Asunción, the metropolitan area, and departments such as Cordillera, Paraguarí, and Presidente Hayes. The project, with an investment of 79 million dollars financed by the Financial Fund for the Development of the River Plate Basin (Fonplata), forms part of a strategy to strengthen the National Interconnected System and advance regional energy integration. President Peña highlighted the importance of diversifying the country's energy matrix, promoting agreements with Argentina to continue the Aña Cuá works, as well as initiatives with Itaipu for the development of solar energy. He also promoted private-sector participation in electricity generation and distribution, and announced reforms to the Energy Law to facilitate that process.

=== Foreign policy ===
It is estimated that, by 15 April 2024, Peña had spent 50 of his 240 days of presidency abroad (or 20% of his presidency).

==== Trips ====
===== 2023 =====
Country	City(ies)	Date	Main reason - Activity	Photograph
United States	New York City	16–23 September	Guest at the 78th United Nations General Assembly	
Argentina	Buenos Aires	12–13 October	Attendance at a football match between the Argentina and Paraguay as part of the CONMEBOL qualifiers for the 2026 FIFA World Cup	
United States	Washington, D.C.	22–25 October	Guest at the Protocolary Session of the Permanent Council of the Organization of American States	
Uruguay	Montevideo	27 October	Meeting with President Luis Lacalle Pou	
Chile	Santiago	6–9 November	Meeting with President Gabriel Boric	
Vatican City	Vatican City	26–27 November	Meeting with Pope Francis	
Italy	Rome	27–30 November	Meeting with President Sergio Mattarella	
United Arab Emirates	Dubai	30 November – 3 December	Guest at the 2023 United Nations Climate Change Conference	
Brazil	Rio de Janeiro	7 December	Meeting with President Luiz Inácio Lula da Silva and transfer of the pro tempore presidency of Mercosur	
Argentina	Buenos Aires	8–10 December	Guest at the inauguration of President Javier Milei	

===== 2024 =====
Country	City(ies)	Date	Main reason - Activity	Photograph
Guatemala	Guatemala City	12–14 January	Guest at the inauguration of President Bernardo Arévalo	
Brazil	Brasília	15 January	Meeting with President Luiz Inácio Lula da Silva	
Argentina	Buenos Aires	14 February	Meeting with President Javier Milei	
Spain	Barcelona and Madrid	25 February – 1 March	Meeting with King Felipe VI and Prime Minister Pedro Sánchez, as well as guest at the Mobile World Congress in Barcelona	
Argentina	Buenos Aires	22–25 March	Meeting with President Javier Milei and participation in the program Almorzando con Juana	
Uruguay	Montevideo	11 April	Meeting with President Luis Lacalle Pou and FIFA president Gianni Infantino on preparations for the 2030 FIFA World Cup	
Argentina	Bariloche	18 April	Meeting with Presidents Javier Milei and Luis Lacalle Pou, of Argentina and Uruguay respectively, at a business forum	
United States	Washington, D.C. and San Francisco	14–18 May	Meeting with U.S. officials (Washington) and executives from Alphabet and Nvidia (San Francisco)	
Taiwan	Taipei	19–22 May	Guest at the inauguration of President William Lai	
United States	Miami	30 May – 1 June	Meeting with commander of U.S. Southern Command Laura Richardson and guest at the Adam Smith Center for Economic Freedom	
El Salvador	San Salvador	1 June	Guest at the inauguration of reelected President Nayib Bukele	
Bolivia	La Paz	13 June	Meeting with President Luis Arce	
Argentina	Buenos Aires	17 July	Commemoration ceremony for the 30th anniversary of the AMIA bombing	
France	Paris	23–28 July	Opening of the 2024 Summer Olympics; meeting with Albert II, Prince of Monaco, Audrey Azoulay, Gianni Infantino, Emmanuel Macron, Benjamin Netanyahu	
Dominican Republic	Santo Domingo	15–17 August	Guest at the inauguration of President Luis Abinader	
Costa Rica	San José	18–20 August	Meeting with President Rodrigo Chaves	
Uruguay	Montevideo	6 September	Guest at a football match between Paraguay and Uruguay	
Argentina	Santa Fe	7 September	Meeting with governor Maximiliano Pullaro	
United States	New York City	22–27 September	Guest at the 80th United Nations General Assembly	

===== 2026 =====
Country	City(ies)	Date	Main reason - Activity	Photograph
Taiwan	Taipei	6–10 May	State visit. Meeting with President Lai Ching-te and Vice President Hsiao Bi-khim. Received an honorary doctorate from the National Taiwan University of Science and Technology.	
Philippines	Manila	10–12 May	Official visit. Meeting with President Bongbong Marcos. First high-level visit between Paraguay and the Philippines.	

==== Relations with Argentina ====
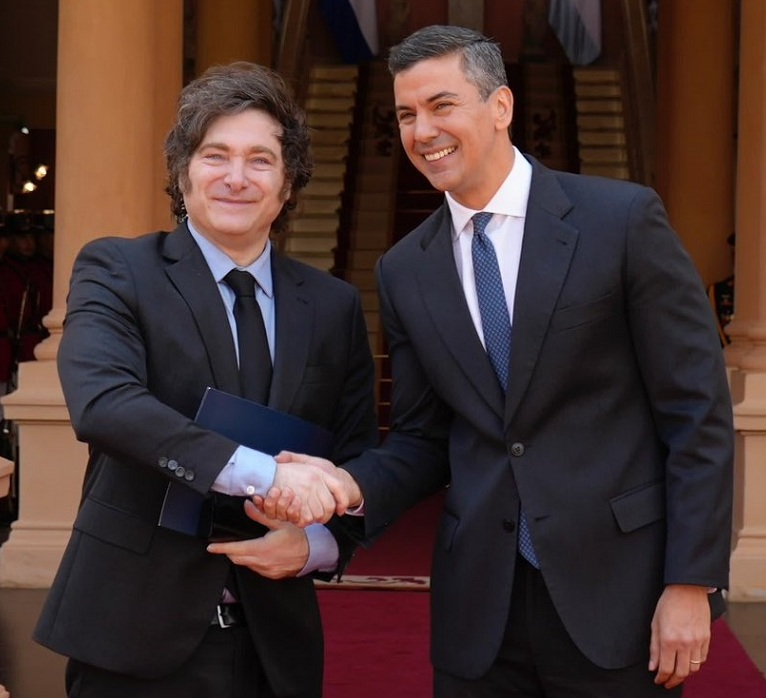
Javier Milei and Peña in April 2025

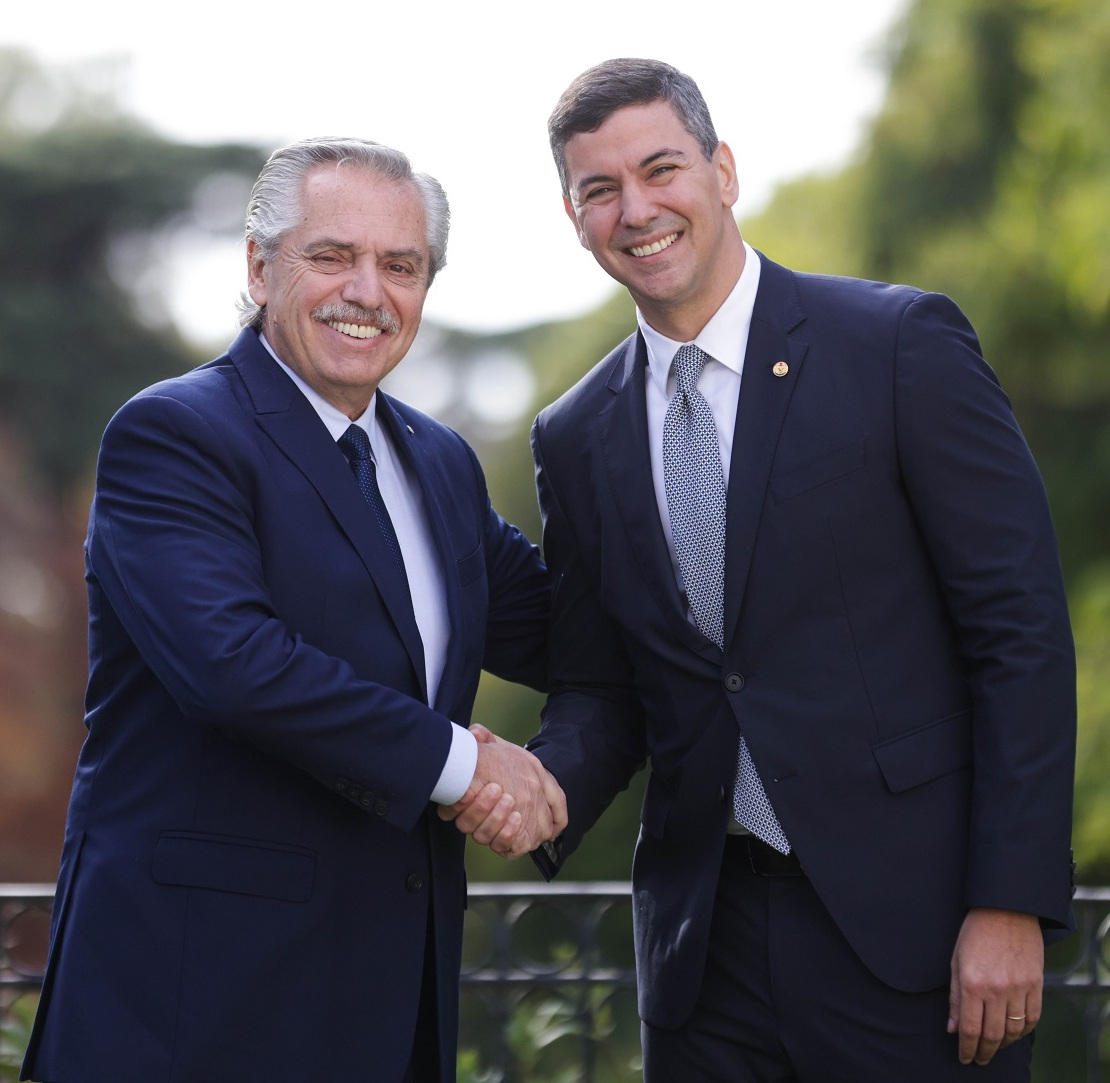
Alberto Fernández and Peña in May 2023

Peña and Javier Milei met on 9 December 2023 and agreed to "deepen" Mercosur. Peña stated that he had placed himself "at Milei's disposal" and attended his presidential inauguration in December 2023.

Paraguay's vice minister of commerce, Óscar Stark, stated on 13 December 2023 that the economic policy of the new Argentine government, which aspires to eliminate multiple exchange rates and move toward exchange-rate unification in the short term, works against the smuggler's business and is therefore favorable for Paraguay, and that "it is going to be much easier to talk than with the previous government".

==== Relations with Brazil ====
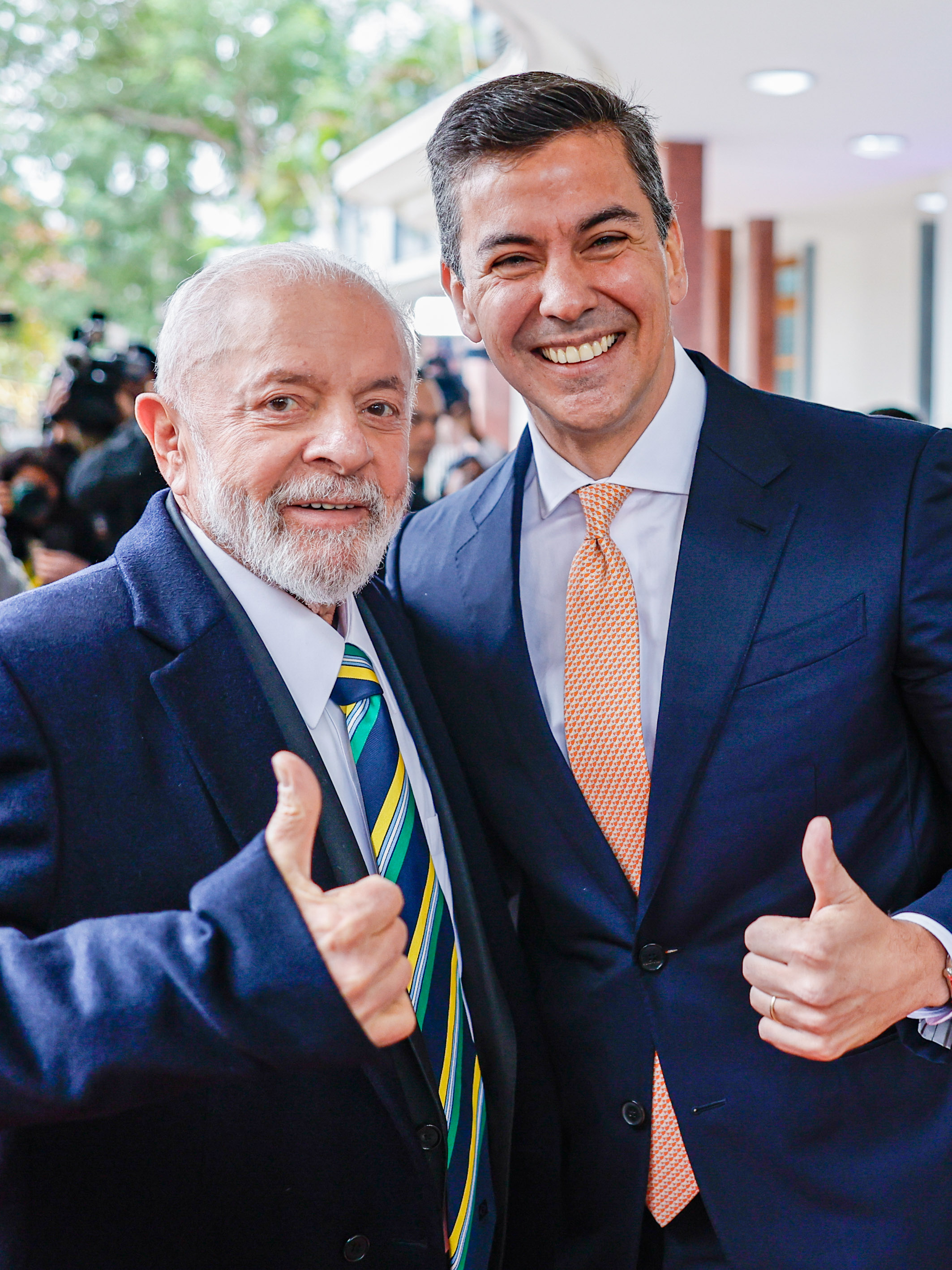
Lula da Silva and Peña in July 2024

===== Itaipu Treaty =====
Peña suspended negotiations with Brazil on the revision of Annex C of the Itaipu Treaty, alleging a supposed case of digital espionage by Brazilian authorities between 2022 and 2023. Critical sectors pointed out that the suspension favored Brazil by keeping frozen a key process to correct what they consider a historic disadvantage for Paraguay in the distribution of the benefits of hydroelectricity generated by Itaipu Binacional.

==== Relations with the United States ====
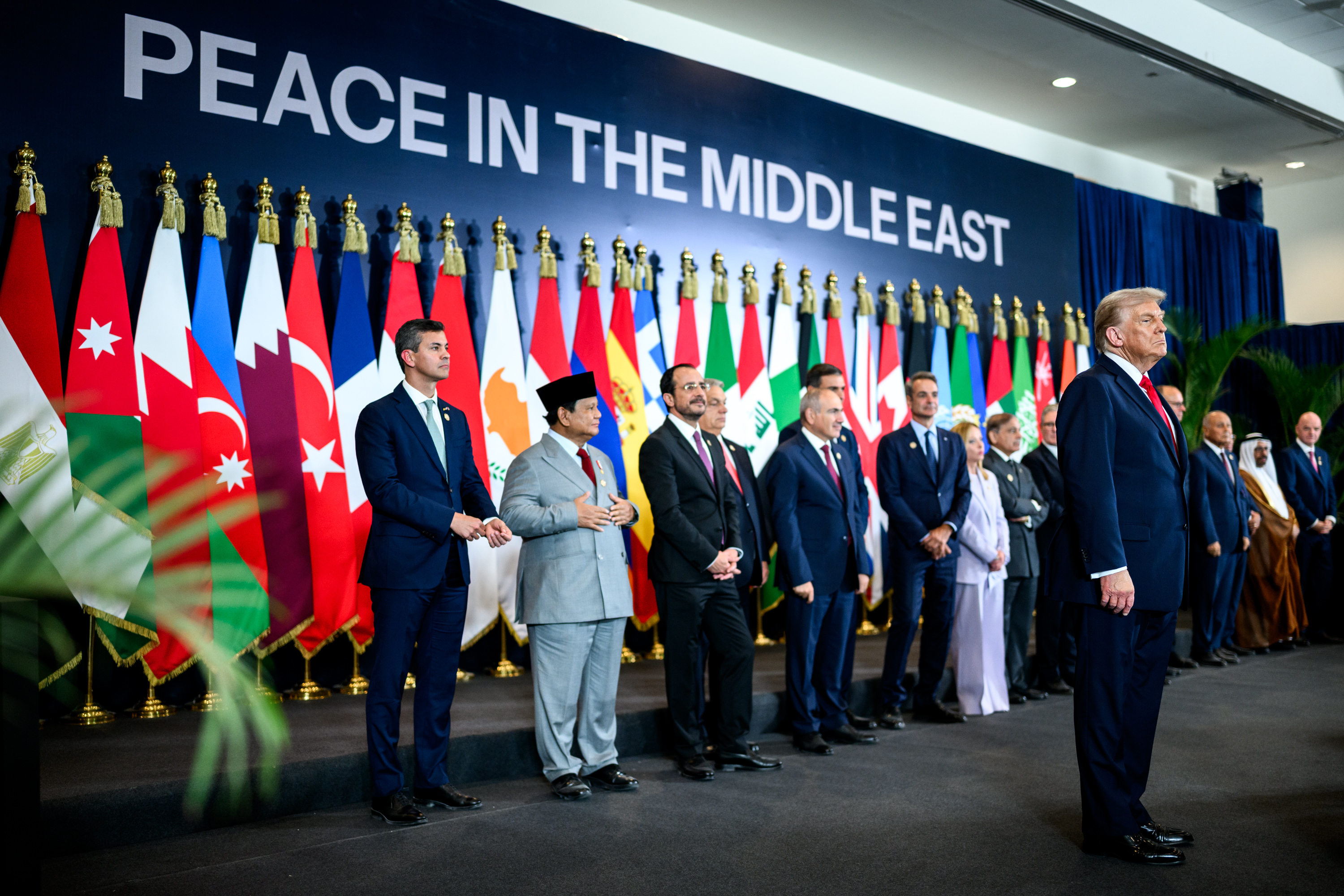
Peña (far left) together with Donald Trump (far right, center) and a group of world leaders at the Gaza peace summit in October 2025

In security matters, in June 2024 the two countries agreed on a joint investment intended to improve connectivity in rural areas through satellite internet and to strengthen national cybersecurity. The United States committed USD 3 million for connectivity and US$3.1 million for cybersecurity in the Paraguayan armed forces. Likewise, in November 2024, the Ministry of Information and Communication Technologies (MITIC) and the United States Southern Command carried out a joint review of the Paraguayan government's computer systems, detecting and mitigating vulnerabilities.

In December 2023, President Peña received General Laura Richardson, commander of United States Southern Command, with whom he discussed cooperation projects in security and the fight against organized crime.

In the commercial sphere, in September 2023 the T-FAST program was renewed until 2025 through a memorandum of understanding, with the aim of reducing non-tariff barriers to agricultural trade and streamlining export processes. Likewise, in May 2023 a cooperation agreement between the United States Department of Agriculture and Paraguay's National Customs Directorate was extended for two years in order to facilitate agricultural trade. The agreement estimated a reduction of 14% in costs and 30% in product release times.

In August 2025, the Donald Trump government signed a migration cooperation agreement with Peña's government (the "Safe Third Country" agreement), which allows asylum seekers in United States territory to process their requests for protection in Paraguay. In December of that same year, both governments signed a Status of Forces Agreement (SOFA) regulating the presence and activities of U.S. soldiers and military personnel on Paraguayan soil. Foreign minister Rubén Ramírez Lezcano confirmed that those soldiers would have immunity in Paraguay.

==== Relations with Israel ====
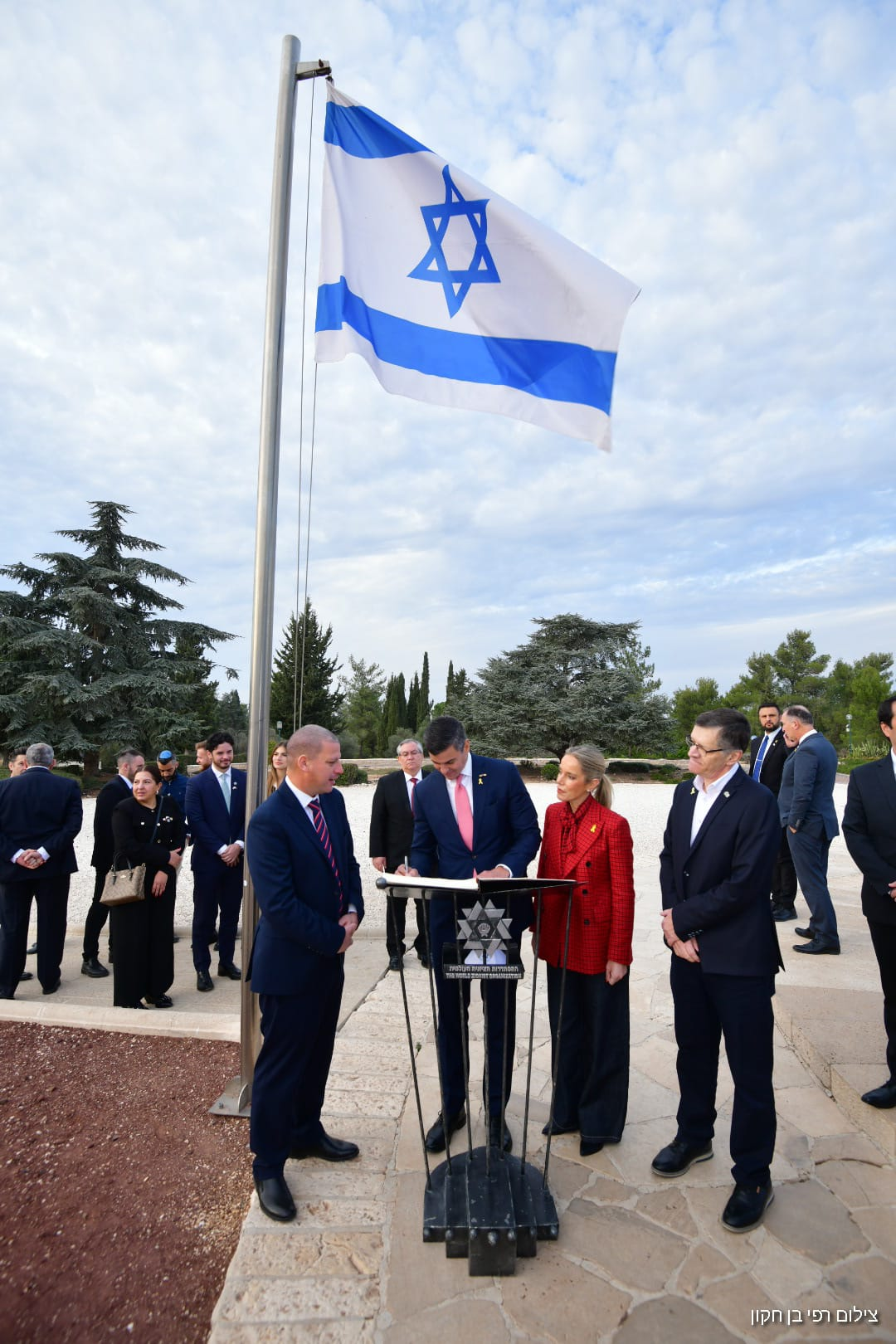
Peña at Mount Herzl in December 2024

In May 2023, Peña announced the intention to move the Paraguayan embassy in Israel from Tel Aviv to Jerusalem. That measure had previously been taken by Horacio Cartes in 2018, but reversed by Mario Abdo Benítez later that same year, causing Israel to close its embassy in Asunción. According to Paraguayan foreign minister Rubén Ramírez Lezcano, the Israeli embassy in Paraguay was expected to reopen in July 2024.

After the outbreak of the war between Israel and Gaza in October 2023, Peña's government adopted a strongly pro-Israel stance, with Paraguay abstaining or voting against several United Nations resolutions calling for a cessation of hostilities between Israel and Hamas, including a vote recognizing Palestine as a legitimate state, in which Paraguay abstained. Likewise, Paraguay opposed the South African case before the International Court of Justice against Israel, in which the former accused the latter of committing genocide in the Gaza Strip, and also opposed the intention of Karim Ahmad Khan, chief prosecutor of the International Criminal Court, to issue international arrest warrants against Israeli prime minister Benjamin Netanyahu and his defense minister Yoav Gallant, calling it "incorrect".

In public statements, Peña has argued that support for Israel goes beyond his personal view and represents, in his words, "a message from the entire Paraguayan nation", appealing to a historical and political affinity between the two countries. This policy has reinforced Paraguay's international alignment with the United States and Israel, although it has generated criticism from sectors warning of possible repercussions for relations with countries of the Arab world and the Global South.

In December 2024, Peña attended the reopening of the Paraguayan embassy in Israel in Jerusalem. Domestically, the government's stance was celebrated by figures in the ruling camp as a reaffirmation of shared democratic values, although it also prompted criticism in the Senate from opposition sectors that considered the diplomatic imbalance risky.

==== Relations with Taiwan ====
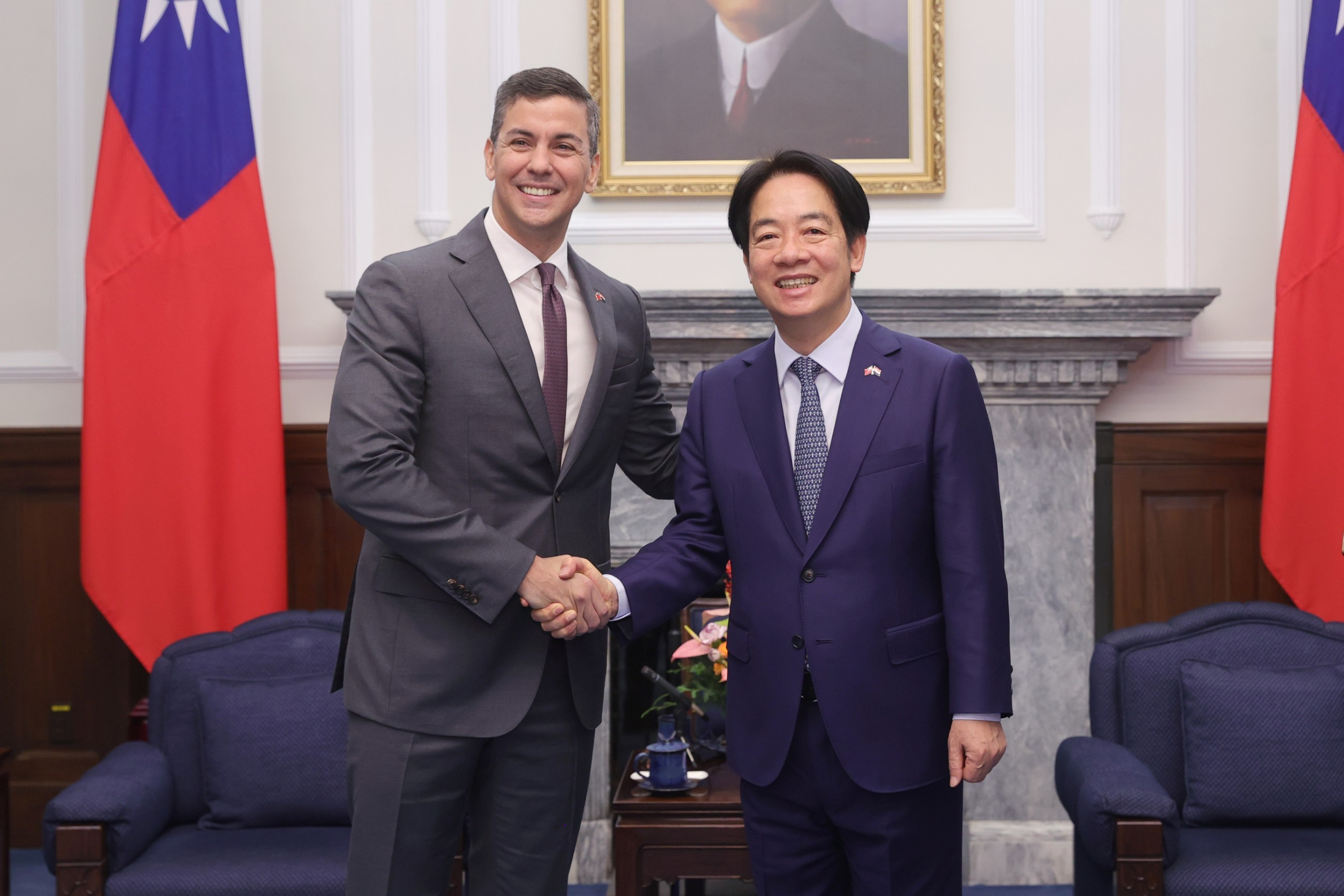
Peña with the president of the Republic of China (Taiwan), William Lai, in May 2024

In April 2025, Santiago Peña received Yu-Lin Huang, secretary-general of Taiwan's International Cooperation and Development Fund (ICDF), to strengthen bilateral cooperation, especially in technological innovation. Initiatives for the development of artificial intelligence (AI) were discussed, including the creation of a data center and the training of human talent in this field. The installation of a regional AI center in Paraguay was proposed as part of a strategy to promote technological development in the country.

==== Relations with Venezuela ====
===== Restoration of diplomatic relations =====
On 15 November 2023, Santiago Peña restored diplomatic relations with Venezuela, after the break that occurred in 2019 under the government of Mario Abdo Benítez. Peña recognized Nicolás Maduro as president, stating that Paraguay would reopen its embassy in Caracas and that Venezuela would do the same in Asunción. Peña defended the gradual resumption of relations with Venezuela, but expressed concern over the disqualification of opposition figure María Corina Machado. He justified the rapprochement as part of a regional strategy after speaking with leaders such as Lula da Silva and Gabriel Boric, assuring that Paraguay remains committed to democracy and human rights. Although he ruled out that the decision was linked to Petropar's debt to PDVSA, he acknowledged the possibility of increasing trade with Venezuela if there were guarantees of payment.

"The Bolivarian Republic of Venezuela has decided, in the full exercise of its sovereignty, to break diplomatic relations with the Republic of Paraguay and to proceed with the immediate withdrawal of its diplomatic personnel accredited in that country".
- Statement by the Venezuelan executive (c. January 2025).

Venezuela broke diplomatic relations with Paraguay on 6 January 2025 due to Santiago Peña's recognition of Edmundo González Urrutia as the winner of the election in Venezuela. Caracas considered this interference in its internal affairs and withdrew its diplomatic personnel from Asunción. In response, the Paraguayan government reaffirmed its support for González Urrutia and demanded the departure of the Venezuelan ambassador and his team within 48 hours.

==== Relations with governmental organizations ====
===== Mercosur =====
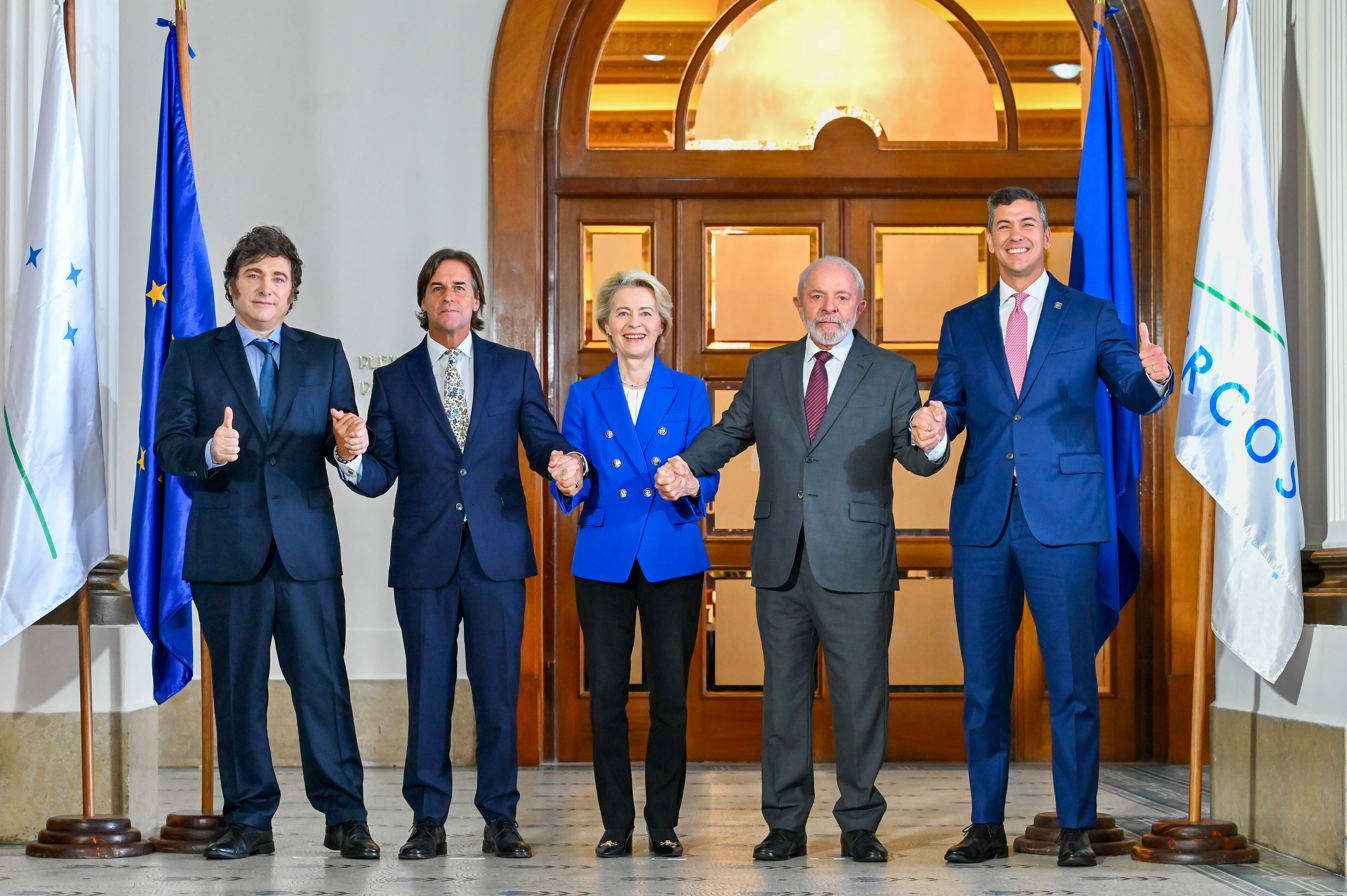
Peña together with presidents of the Mercosur countries and the president of the European Commission, Ursula von der Leyen, 6 December 2024

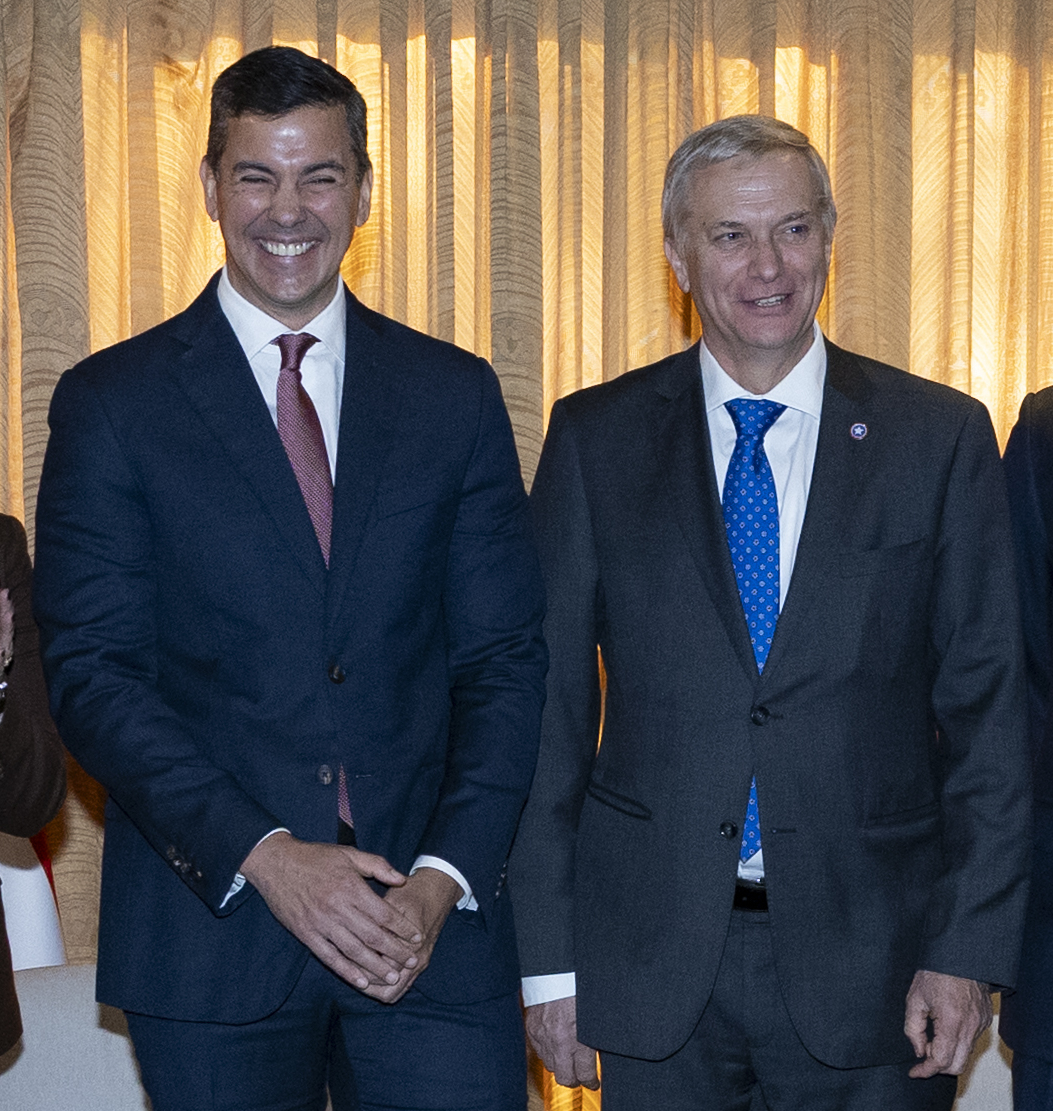
Peña together with Chilean president-elect José Antonio Kast, 2025

At the beginning of July 2024, Santiago Peña expressed his opposition to the flexibilization of Mercosur, arguing that it is more advantageous to negotiate as a bloc, and questioned Uruguay's position of moving forward with bilateral agreements. Although in the first days of his term he had shown a willingness toward extra-bloc agreements, at that time he adopted the opposite stance. Prior to the transfer of the rotating presidency of Mercosur to Uruguay, Peña pointed to the need to continue efforts to strengthen regional integration, acknowledging that the bloc is going through a period of challenges. In October 2024, Peña lowered expectations regarding an imminent trade agreement between Mercosur and the European Union, underscoring that, although the bloc has shown interest in moving toward a free trade agreement, it has not found an equivalent willingness in Europe. He described as "unacceptable" the lack of recognition by Brussels of Paraguay's sanitary certification institutions. In December of that same year, he aligned himself with the position of the president of Brazil, Luiz Inácio Lula da Silva, reaffirming that Paraguay will not support unilateral negotiations that could fragment Mercosur's cohesion.

===== OAS =====
Peña initially promoted the candidacy of his foreign minister, Rubén Ramírez Lezcano, for the General Secretariat of the Organization of American States (OAS), although it was withdrawn in March 2025 following regional support for the candidate from Suriname, Albert Ramdin. Nevertheless, the Paraguayan government has highlighted the importance of maintaining institutional ties with the United States Congress within the framework of the bilateral agenda.

===== OECD =====
During an address to Argentine businesspeople in October 2024, Peña stated that one of the principal goals of his government is for Paraguay to become a member of the Organisation for Economic Co-operation and Development (OECD). He explained that, to achieve this goal, it is essential to continue promoting development in key areas such as education and security.

== Political views ==
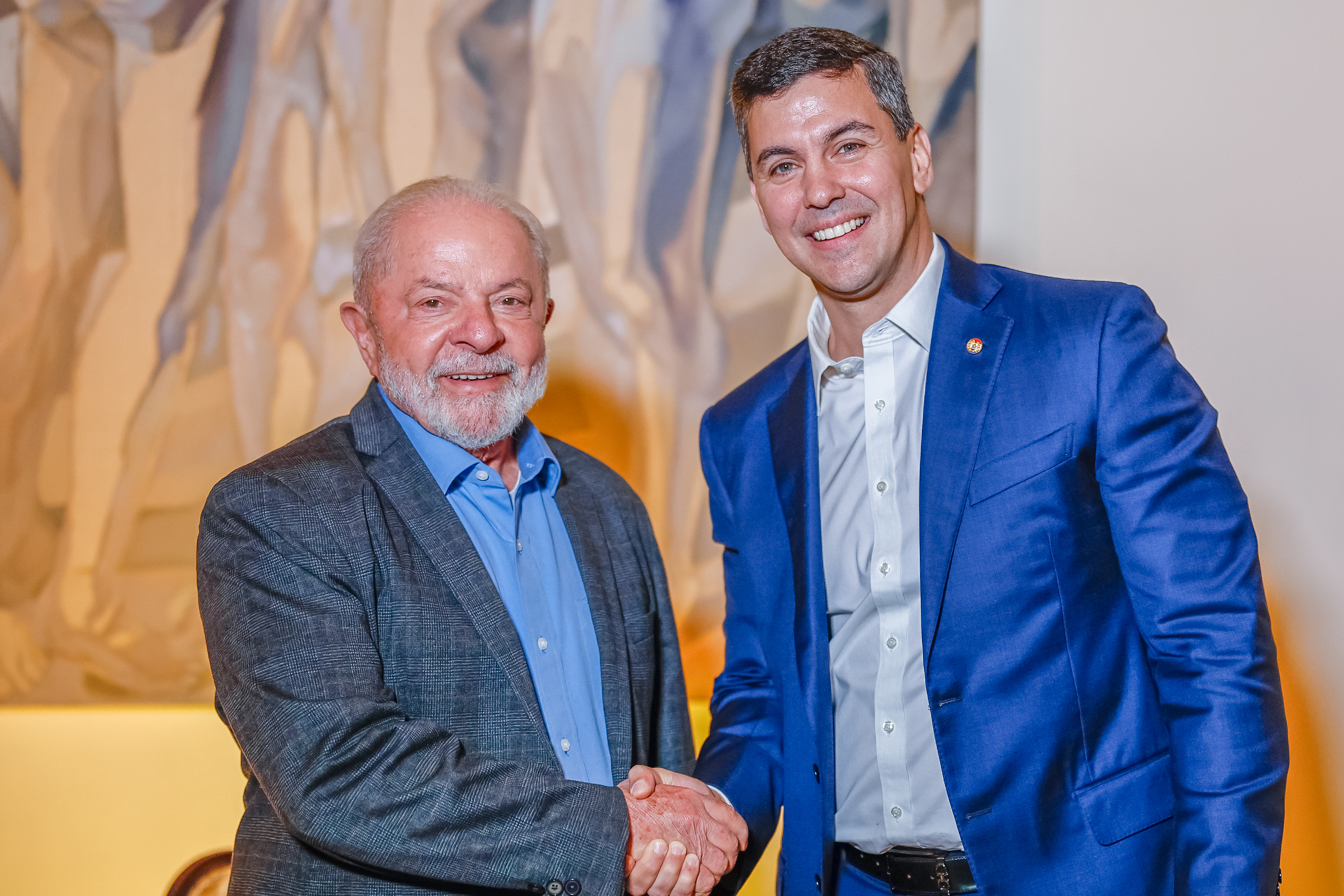
Peña with Brazilian president Lula da Silva in August 2023

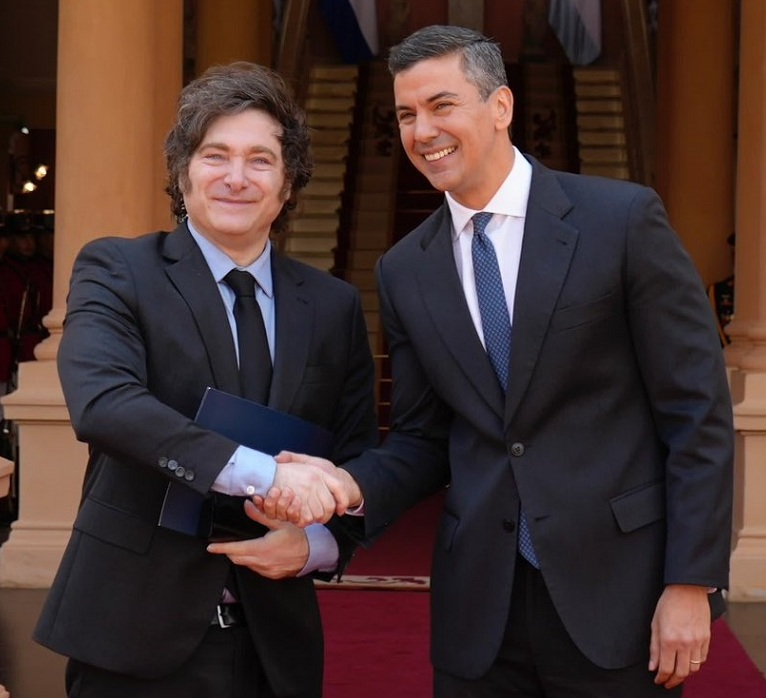
Peña with Argentine president Javier Milei in April 2025

By the time of the 2023 election, Peña was considered a conservative politician who opposed the legalization of abortion and same-sex marriage. In May 2017, however, he had stated that he was in favor of same-sex marriage, while saying in regards of abortion that he was open for it to "be discussed in a sincere environment and without prejudice". He reversed position shortly afterwards following criticism from conservative sectors. During his 2023 campaign, he promised to create 500,000 jobs. He also ruled out raising taxes.

On foreign policy, Peña pledged to maintain Paraguay's diplomatic relations with the Republic of China (Taiwan). In May 2023, Peña announced that he intended to move the Paraguayan embassy in Israel from Tel Aviv to Jerusalem after being sworn in as president; a move that was previously made by Horacio Cartes in 2018, but reversed by Mario Abdo Benítez later that year. Peña eventually attended the inauguration of the embassy in December 2024. Peña and his government expressed vocal support for Israel during the Gaza war and the Twelve-Day War, with Paraguay siding with Israel during South Africa's genocide case against Israel.

As president, Paraguay restored diplomatic relations with Venezuela in November 2023; relations were strained since 2019. Relations between the two nations were broken again in February 2025, however, after Peña recognized Edmundo González as the winner of the 2024 Venezuelan presidential election. On the 2026 United States intervention in Venezuela, Peña stated that "it can only bring good news".

In February 2023, Peña said in an interview with Folha de S.Paulo that the military dictatorship of Alfredo Stroessner had resulted in "more than 50 years of stability in Paraguay". He further asserted that Stroessner, who came to power as a result of a coup d'état, had come to a power as a result of a "political agreement". Peña's comments were criticised by opposition politicians and activists, and he was accused of trying to attract conservative and ultraconservative voters within the Colorado Party.

== Controversies ==
On 7 April 2025, Arnoldo Wiens (ANR) questioned Santiago Peña's administration, accusing him of failing to fulfill his campaign promises and of allowing a group close to the government to rapidly accumulate large fortunes. According to Wiens, the citizenry, especially in the interior of the country, has not experienced substantial improvements, and he called for greater transparency and commitment to the principles defended during the campaign.

A few days later, former deputy Édgar Acosta (PLRA) expanded the criticism, accusing the president of prioritizing his own business interests and those of his circle over the general welfare. In statements to ABC Cardinal, Acosta said that Peña had promoted changes to the Conflict of Interest Law in order to benefit his private ties, and that his name and those of his associates appear linked to various public tenders. In Acosta's view, this conduct confirmed the warnings made after Peña's election, which pointed to a government oriented toward benefiting a specific economic sector, in line with a broader strategy by cartismo to preserve its power through control of key resources.

On 21 April, the criticism intensified from the religious sphere. Bishop emeritus Mario Melanio Medina warned about the penetration of drug trafficking into state institutions and alleged that the judiciary was subordinated to illicit economic power. He accused the Colorado Party of acting in favor of private interests, contributing to social inequality and the deterioration of democratic institutions. Medina expressed concern about the lack of legal certainty, the weakness of the political opposition, and skepticism regarding the negotiations over Annex C of the Itaipu Treaty, stating that any eventual benefits would primarily favor Brazil.

Santiago Peña was criticized for his decision not to attend the funeral of Pope Francis. Peña's absence was regarded as a lack of reciprocity toward the affection shown by Francis for Paraguay, a deeply Catholic nation. Instead, Peña opted for an eleven-day trip to the United States to receive a private award.

Peña has also attracted criticism for his international trips, which have been perceived as excessive. By mid-May 2025, Peña was estimated to have made more than 40 international trips as head of state, at a cost of ₲4.000 billion (or US$585,000), and to have spent a total of 126 days outside Paraguayan territory. His supporters have defended these measures, arguing that they attract more private investment to Paraguay.

=== UENO Bank S.A. crisis and dismissal ===
On 2 November 2026, UENO Bank S.A. (a major lender in Paraguay) collapsed and was put under intervention by the Central Bank of Paraguay. The financial crisis originating afterwards, together with the alleged links of the Paraguayan government to UENO Bank S.A., set the conditions for the outbreak of a political crisis and protests which led to President Peña submitting his resignation on 5 November 2026. Congress failed to approve it as the legislators of the governing party withdrew from the joint session, depriving it of a quorum. Hence, Peña still held the office of President of the Republic of Paraguay. Later that day, the Chamber of Deputies approved the impeachment charges against him—the Senate began the trial, and his defence was scheduled for 6 November 2026. Peña requested a 72-hour extension for his defence, but it was rejected. His lawyers presented the defence before the Senate, but Peña did not appear in person. On 6 November, the Senate removed Peña from office and he was placed under house arrest. He was expelled from the Colorado Party on 11 November.

== Personal life ==
Peña married his wife, Leticia Ocampos, in 1997. They have two children, Gonzalo and Constanza. The family is Catholic. Following Peña's resignation request in 2026, his daughter Constanza posted a photograph of herself wearing a T-shirt bearing the phrase "Tax The Poor", which drew criticism from Paraguayans.

== Honours and awards ==
- Brazil:
  - São Paulo:
    - Grand Cross of the Order of Ipiranga (26 July 2023)
- Taiwan:
  - Order of Brilliant Jade (8 May 2026)

=== Awards ===
In April 2025, Peña was awarded the AJC Gesher Award from the American Jewish Committee in recognition of his support of Israel. In May 2026, he received an honorary degree from the National Taiwan University of Science and Technology.

== See also ==
- List of current heads of state and government
- List of heads of the executive by approval rating

== Notes ==
Political offices
Preceded by Germán Rojas	Minister of Finance; 2015–2017	Succeeded by Lea Giménez
Preceded by Mario Abdo Benítez	President of Paraguay; 2023–2026	Succeeded by Pedro Alliana
Party political offices
Preceded by Mario Abdo Benítez	Colorado nominee for President of Paraguay; 2023	Most recent
