= Germán Rojas =

Germán Rojas can refer to:

- Germán Rojas (politician), Paraguayan politician
- Germán Rojas (footballer) (born 1979), Spanish footballer
