= Paraguayan peso =

Former currency of Paraguay

peso paraguayo (Spanish)

Units of account
- Plural: pesos
- Subunit
- 1/100: centavo

Denominations
- Banknotes: 20, 50, 100, 200, 500, 1000 pesos
- Coins: 50 centavos, 1, 2, 5, 10 pesos

Demographics
- User(s): Paraguay

Issuance
- Central bank: Banco Central del Paraguay
- Website: www.bcp.gov.py
- This infobox shows the latest status before this currency was rendered obsolete.

The peso was the currency of Paraguay between 1856 and 1944. It replaced the real at a rate of 8 reales = 1 peso. Until 1870, the peso was subdivided into 8 reales. Paraguay then decimalized, with 100 centésimos = 1 peso. The name of the subdivision was changed to centavo in 1874. The peso was replaced in 1944 by the guaraní at a rate of one hundred to one.

== Coins ==
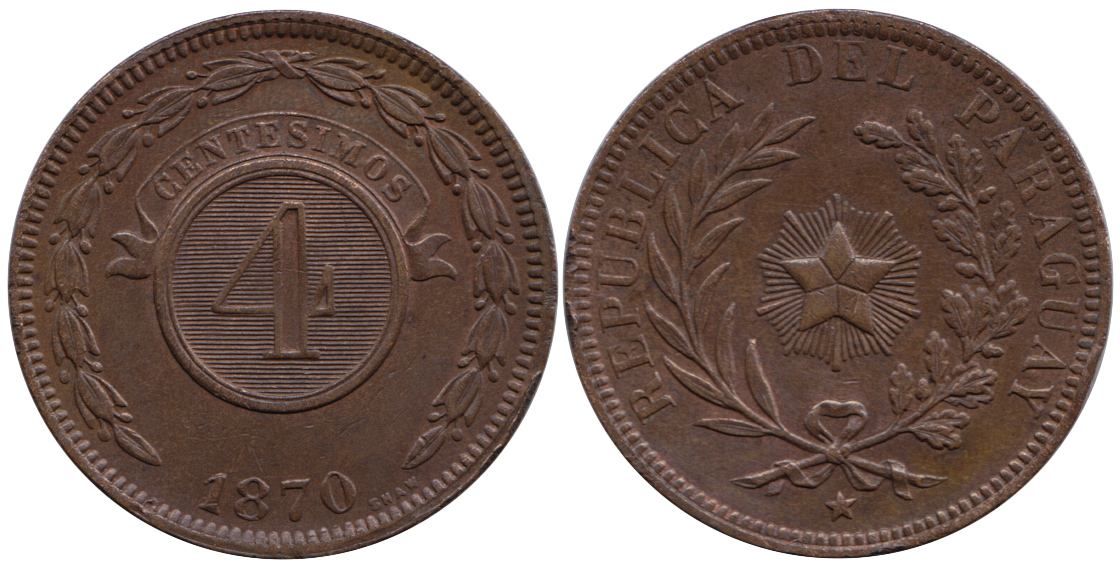
4 centesimos 1870. Copper.

In 1867, Paraguay issued its first gold coins, for 4 pesos, during the War of the Triple Alliance. Copper coins were issued in 1870 in denominations of 1, 2 and 4 centesimos, followed in 1889 by silver 1 peso. In 1900, cupro-nickel 5, 10 and 20 centavos were introduced, followed in 1925 by cupro-nickel 50 centavos and 1 and 2 pesos. In 1938, aluminium replaced cupro-nickel in these last three denominations, with cupro-nickel 5 and 10 pesos introduced the following year.

== Banknotes ==
In 1856, the National Treasury issued notes in denominations of 1/2 and 4 reales, 1 and 2 pesos. These were followed by notes for 1 and 2 reales, 3, 4, 5 and 10 pesos by 1870.

In 1870, the General Treasury took over paper money production and issued the only notes denominated in centésimos. These were for 50 centésimos. The peso notes were denominated in "peso fuerte". Notes denominated in reales were issued until 1871. In 1874, notes for 10, 20 and 50 centavos were issued, with 20 pesos notes introduced in 1875.

In 1894, The government took direct control of note issue, with a series in denominations of 50 centavos, 1, 5, 10, 20, 50 and 100 pesos. 200 and 500 pesos notes were introduced in 1899. 50 centavos and 1 peso notes were last issued in the 1916 series. 1000 pesos notes were introduced in 1923.

In 1907, the Bank of the Republic issued notes for 5, 10, 50, 100 and 1000 pesos national money which were also denominated as 50 centavos, 1, 5 and 10 pesos in gold. Private banks such as El Banco De Comercio and Lezica y Lanús issued notes in Asunción.
