= Olinda Massare de Kostianovsky =

Paraguayan historian

Olinda Massare de Kostianovsky (1939–2012) was a Paraguayan historian, best known as a historian of education and women in Paraguay. From 2010 to 2012 she was President of the Paraguayan Academy of History, the first woman to hold the position.

== Life ==
Olinda Massare de Kostianovsky was born on 25 March 1939. She gained her PhD in philosophy of education.

Massare was a professor and dean of the Faculty of Philosophy at the Universidad Nacional de Asunción. From 1990 to 1993 she was Vice Minister of Culture.

Massare also served as president of the Paraguay-Israel Cultural Institute (ICPI). She was recognized with honours by the governments of Venezuela and Ecuador.

She died on 4 December 2012.

== Works ==
- La instrucción pública en la época colonial [Public instruction in colonial times]. Asunción, 1968.
- La mujer paraguaya: su participación en la Guerra Grande [The Paraguayan woman: her participation in the Great War]. Asunción, 1970.
- 'Historia e evolución de la población en el Paraguay'. In Domingo M. Rivarola and G. Heisecke, eds., Población, urbanización y recursos humanos en el Paraguay, 2nd ed., Asunción, 1970.
- El Vice Presidente Domingo Francisco Sánchez. Asunción, 1972.
