= Xavier Technical College =

- Spanish: Colegio Tecnico Javier

Location
- Trinity, Asunción; Paraguay
- Coordinates: 25°15′55″S 57°34′48″W

Information
- Type: Private pre-school, primary and secondary school
- Religious affiliation: Catholicism
- Denomination: Jesuit
- Patron saint: Francis Xavier
- Established: 1970; 56 years ago
- Rector: Mariano Garcia
- Director: Marta Villa Escudero
- Grades: Pre-school; K-12
- Gender: Co-educational
- Enrollment: 913
- Website: www.ctj.edu.py

Xavier Technical College (Spanish: Colegio Tecnico Javier) is a private Catholic pre-school, primary and secondary school, located in Trinity, Asunción, Paraguay. The co-educational school was established by the Society of Jesus in 1970.

== Overview ==
Xavier Technical College opened in Asuncion in March 1970. Mornings saw primary school with initially 20 students in three grades, afternoons high school with 70 students, and evenings six professional courses with about 90 students enrolled.

The College has since grown to include more than nine hundred students.

== See also ==
- Catholic Church in Paraguay
- Education in Paraguay
- List of Jesuit schools
