= Lea Giménez =

121st Finance Minister of Paraguay

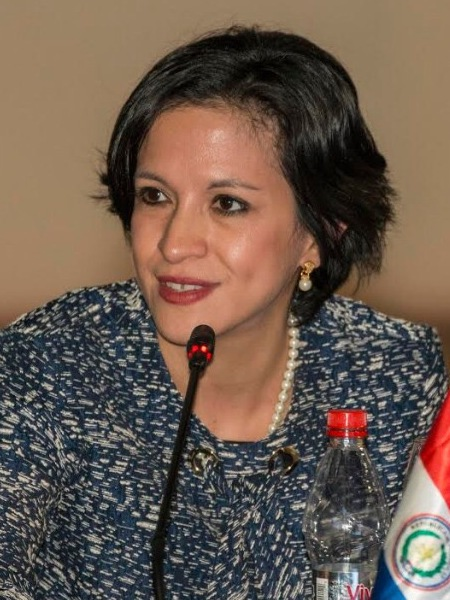
Giménez in 2017.

Lea Giménez (born 1981) is a Paraguayan economist and the former finance minister of Paraguay. She was the first woman to hold the position and the youngest person to ever hold the position of finance minister in Latin America. She currently serves as Executive Advisor to the President of the Development Bank of Latin America and the Caribbean (CAF). She has an outstanding professional career in both the public and private sectors. She has served as Secretary General and Chief of the Civil Cabinet of the Presidency of the Republic of Paraguay, and Deputy Minister of Economy, being also the first woman to hold these positions.

== Career ==
Giménez led the preparation of President Santiago Peña's government plan for the 2023-2028 period and was the Head of the Transition Team for President-elect Santiago Peña. As Chief of the Civil Cabinet of the Presidency of the Republic of Paraguay, she was responsible for coordinating, managing, and overseeing policy development, operations, and Cabinet-related decisions for the President. Additionally, she was in charge of structuring and leading the Presidency’s Management Unit, which oversees the government’s strategic and flagship projects and programs. These initiatives include the development and implementation of the National Anti-Corruption Strategy, strategic infrastructure projects, the Che Roga Pora housing program, the digitalization of the public health sector with the support of the Republic of China Taiwan, and the design and execution of key projects such as SUMAR and Zero Hunger in Schools.

As Minister of Finance, she chaired the National Economic Team and established and chaired the Technical Tax Commission of Paraguay. She also led the signing of the Multilateral Convention on Mutual Administrative Assistance in Tax Matters, positioning Paraguay as the 119th jurisdiction to adopt this instrument aimed at improving transparency and combating cross-border tax evasion. Giménez also spearheaded the development of Paraguay’s first comprehensive tax reform package, which was approved in 2019. The reform modernized the tax system, addressed tax evasion, promoted financial transparency, and generated funds for key sectors such as health, education, and infrastructure without increasing tax rates. She also led the Excellence Fund for Education in Paraguay and the National Financial Inclusion Strategy Commission.

In June 2017, President Horacio Cartes appointed Giménez as Minister of Finance.

In 2018, as Minister of Finance, Giménez spearheaded the project to create a Superintendency of Retirement and Pensions.

In May 2018, Giménez; the Minister of Labor, Guillermo Sosa; the President of the Central Bank of Paraguay (BCP), Carlos Fernández Valdovinos; and the head of the Social Security Institute (IPS), Benigno López, held a press conference explaining the urgency and necessity of having a Superintendency of Pensions and Retirement Benefits.

In August 2018, Giménez, accompanied by Benigno López, met with representatives of the Senate, indicating that the Superintendency was necessary to prevent further scams like the one involving Cajubi.

In September 2023, President Peña appointed Giménez to the Itaipu Binational Board.

She also played a strategic role as a member of the Board of Directors of the Itaipú Binational Entity during a period when Paraguay achieved an important and beneficial tariff agreement for a period of three years. Internationally, she was Division Chief of the Institutions for Development Sector at the Inter-American Development Bank, leading the agendas of Citizen Security and Justice, Public Management, State Digital Transformation, and Transparency and Integrity. In addition, she worked as an economist in the Global Poverty and Macro-Fiscal Practices at the World Bank in countries across Latin America, the Caribbean, and South Asia. She was an honorary member of the Board of Directors of the Open Contracting Partnership and an Adjunct Professor at Lehigh University.

Giménez holds a Ph.D. in Economics from Lehigh University (Pennsylvania). Her doctoral thesis ("Shocks and the Opportunities of Children") received the Elizabeth Stout Dissertation Award, given to doctoral theses considered to make unusually significant and original contributions to their field. She also has executive training from Harvard University and Columbia University. In 2022, she was included in the list of inspiring women by the World Commerce and Contracting.

== Publications ==
=== Research ===
- Chen, Cheng, Shin-Yi Chou, Lea Gimenez, and Jin-Tan Liu. 2020. The Quantity of Education and Preference for Sons: Evidence from Taiwan's Compulsory Education Reform, China Economic Review 59: 101369.
- Qian, Mengcen, Shin-Yi Chou, Lea Gimenez, and Jin-Tan Liu. 2017. The Intergenerational Transmission of Low Birth Weight and Intrauterine Growth Restriction: A Large Cross-generational Cohort Study in Taiwan, Maternal and Child Health Journal 21 (7), pp. 1512–1521.
- Gimenez, Lea, Dean Jolliffe, and Iffath Sharif. 2014. Bangladesh, a Middle Income Country by 2021: What Will It Take in terms of Poverty Reduction?, The Bangladesh Development Studies 37 (1-2).
- Gimenez, Lea, and Dean Jolliffe. 2014. Inflation for the Poor in Bangladesh: A Comparison of CPI and Household Survey Data, The Bangladesh Development Studies 37 (1-2).
- Gimenez, Lea, Shin-Yi Chou, Jin-Tan Liu, and Jin-Long Liu. 2013. Parental Loss and Children's Well-Being, The Journal of Human Resources 48 (4), pp. 1035–1071.

=== Books ===
- Giménez, Lea, Carlos Rodríguez-Castelán and Daniel Valderrama. 2015. Shared Prosperity in Colombia, in Shared Prosperity and Poverty Eradication in Latin America and the Caribbean (eds. Ed. Cord, Louise, Maria Eugenia Genoni, and Carlos Rodríguez-Castelán), pp. 99–134, Washington, D.C.: Banco Mundial.
- Giménez, Lea and Carmen Marín. 2018. Retos y Oportunidades del Sistema de Jubilaciones y Pensiones del Paraguay en Sistema Financiero Paraguayo. Construyendo sobre sólidos fundamentos paraguayos. Banco Central del Paraguay, pp. 114–147.

=== Policy notes and reports ===
- Lea Giménez, María Ana Lugo, Sandra Martínez, Humberto Colman, Juan José Galeano and Gabriela Farfán. 2017. Paraguay: Análisis del sistema fiscal y su impacto en la pobreza y la equidad, CEQ Working Paper 74, Commitment to Equity (CEQ) Institute, Tulane University.
- Giménez, Lea, Sara Hause Van Wie, Miriam Muller, Rebecca F. Shutte, Megan Z. Rounseville and Martha C. Viveros Mendoz. 2015. Enhancing Youth Skills and Economic Opportunities to Reduce Teenage Pregnancy in Colombia, Washington, D.C.: Banco Mundial.
- Giménez, Lea, Edwin St. Catherine, Jonathan Karver y Rei Odawara. 2015. The Aftermath of the 2008 Global Financial Crisis in the Eastern Caribbean - The Impact on the St. Lucia Labor Market, Washington, D.C.: Banco Mundial.
- Rodríguez-Castelán, Carlos, Lea Giménez y Tania Diaz Bazan. 2014. Colombia's 2012 Tax Reform Poverty and Social Impact Analysis, Washington, D.C.: Banco Mundial.
- Rodríguez-Castelán, Carlos, Lea Giménez y Daniel Valderrama. 2014. Chapter 2: Toward Shared Prosperity in Colombia, in Towards Sustainable Peace, Poverty Eradication, and Shared Prosperity – Colombia Policy Notes. Washington, D.C.: Banco Mundial.
- Rodríguez-Castelán, Carlos, Lea Giménez y Daniel Valderrama. 2014. Chapter 2: Hacia La Paz Sostenible, La Erradicación De La Pobreza y La Prosperidad Compartida – Notas de Política: Colombia. Washington, D.C.: Banco Mundial.
- Jolliffe, Dean, Iffath Sharif, Lea Giménez y Faizuddin Ahmed. 2013. Bangladesh - Poverty assessment: Assessing a decade of progress in reducing poverty, 2000-2010, Bangladesh Development Series no. 31, Washington, D.C.: Banco Mundial.

=== Short Articles ===
- Giménez, Lea. 2022. La política económica no es comedia de improvisación, La Nación, Paraguay.
- Giménez, Lea. 2021-2022. Varios Artículos, Revista Foco - La Nación, Paraguay.
- Giménez, Lea. 2021. A la altura de las circunstancias, Ultima Hora – Paraguay.
- Giménez, Lea. 2021. Good digitalization does not happen on its own: it requires good human decisions, Gobernarte, Washington D.C.
- Giménez, Lea and Edgardo Mosqueira. 2021. Invertir mejor no es invertir más: La importancia de una buena gestión, Gobernarte, Washington D.C.
- Giménez, Lea and Edgardo Mosqueira. 2020. Latinoamérica frente al covid-19: un nuevo contrato social, Foreign Affairs Latinoamérica, Washington D.C.
- Giménez, Lea and Roberto de Michele. 2020. La corrupción en América Latina no tiene que ser una cotidianidad, Opinión. The Washington Post, Washington D.C.
- Giménez, Lea. 2019.Instituciones fuertes, Comunidades seguras, Opinión. El País, España.
- Giménez, Lea. 2017. La macro no llega a la micro: ¿mito o realidad?, Economic Blog, Ministry of Finance Paraguay.
- Giménez, Lea and Dean Jolliffe. 2013. Bangladesh: Resilience and Long-Term Goals, End Poverty in South Asia, The World Bank Group.
- Giménez, Lea. 2012. Hard Facts on Poverty in Afghanistan, End Poverty in South Asia, The World Bank Group.
