= Paraguayan real =

Currency of Paraguay until 1856

The real was the currency of Paraguay until 1856. Initially, the Spanish colonial real circulated. This was followed, in 1813, by the Argentine real. In 1845, Paraguay began issuing its own reales. Sixteen silver reales equaled one gold escudo. In 1856, the Paraguayan peso was introduced, worth 8 reales. The real continued to circulate as the subdivision of the peso until 1870, when Paraguay decimalized.

The only coin issued for Paraguay in this currency was a copper 1/12 real piece, struck in 1845. These coins were devalued to 1/24 real in 1847.
