= Carlos Fernández Valdovinos =

Paraguayan economist (born 1965)

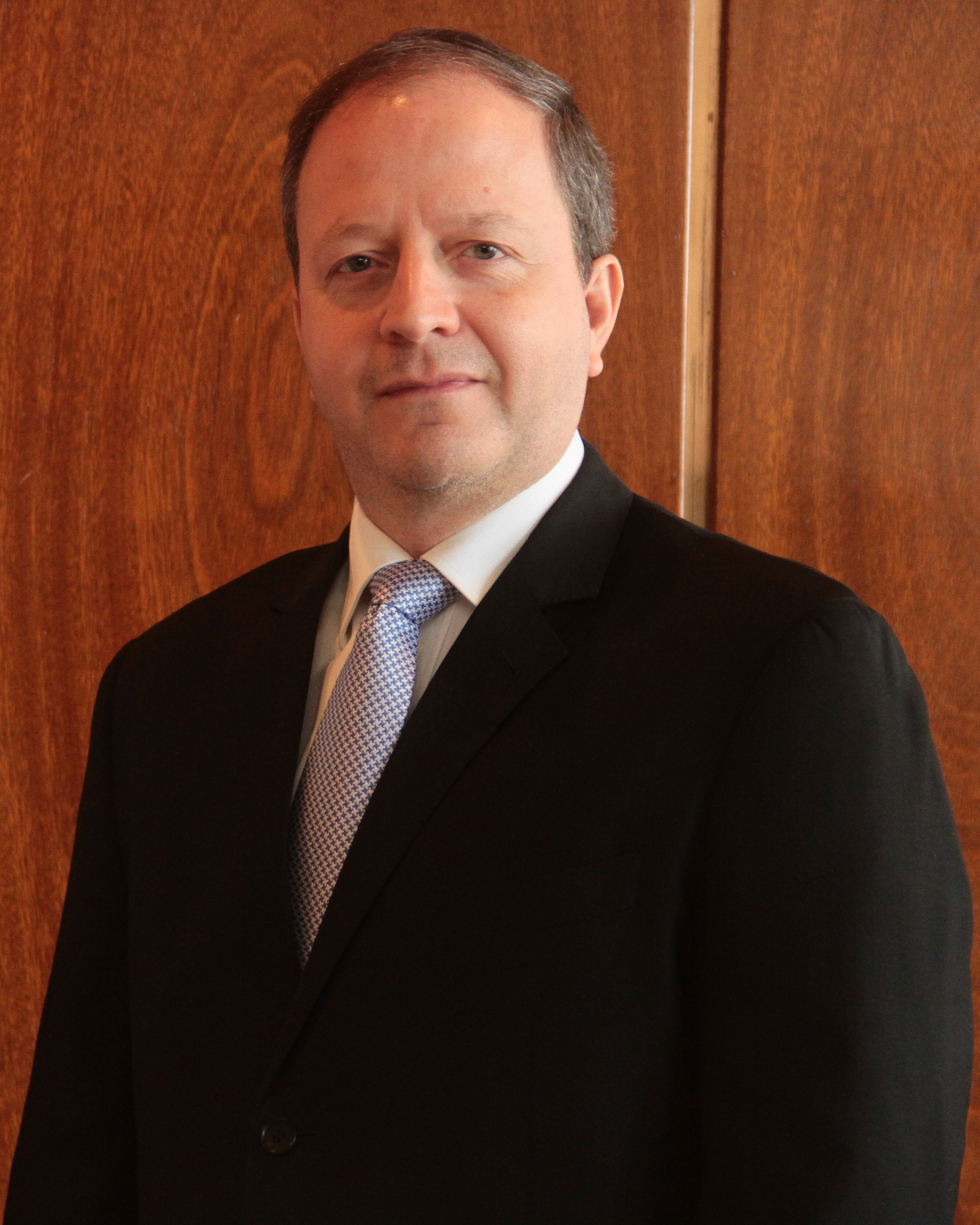
- Carlos Fernández Valdovinos in 2016

Minister of Economy and Finance
- In office 2023–2026
- President: Santiago Peña
- Preceded by: Oscar Llamosas Díaz
- Succeeded by: Oscar Lovera

President of the Central Bank of Paraguay
- In office 2013–2018
- Preceded by: Jorge Corvalán Mendoza
- Succeeded by: José Cantero Sienra

Personal details
- Born: February 9, 1965 (age 61) Asunción, Paraguay
- Education: Universidade Federal do Paraná; University of Illinois at Urbana–Champaign; University of Chicago
- Occupation: economist
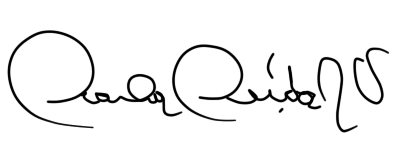
- Signature

Carlos Fernández Valdovinos (born February 9, 1965, in Asunción, Paraguay) is a Paraguayan economist. Between October 2013 and August 2018 he was the president of the Central Bank of Paraguay.

== Education ==
Fernández Valdovinos earned his degree in economics from the Universidade Federal do Paraná in 1990. He received his M.Sc. in economics from the University of Illinois at Urbana–Champaign in 1994, and his Ph.D. in economics from University of Chicago in 1999, with the presentation of the doctoral thesis "Inflation and welfare in an endogenously growing economy". Robert E. Lucas (Chairman), Larry Sjaastad, and Fernando Alvarez served as members of the evaluation committee.

== Career ==
Fernández Valdovinos began his career at the Central Bank of Paraguay as the Section Head for Monetary Programming in 1991–1992. He served as an advisor for the managing director of the Economic Research Division in 1999–2001, and was later appointed managing director of the same division in 2001 and served until 2004.

Beginning in 2004, Fernández Valdovinos transferred to the World Bank headquarters in Washington, D.C., where he served as senior economist covering Argentina until 2006. Later, he served in the International Monetary Fund (IMF) as senior economist covering the EMEA region from 2006 to 2011. Furthermore, he served as the IMF Resident Representative in Bolivia and Brazil.

In August 2013, President Horacio Cartes appointed Fernández Valdovinos as president of the Central Bank of Paraguay (BCP).

On October 3, 2013, Fernández Valdovinos was nominated to replace Jorge Corvalan as president of the Central Bank of Paraguay, until August 2018.

In October 2018, he was appointed to the Board of Directors of Banco Basa.

In May 2018, Fernández Valdovinos, as President of the BCP, the Minister of Finance, Lea Giménez, the Minister of Labor, Guillermo Sosa; and the head of the Social Security Institute (IPS), Benigno López, held a press conference explaining the urgency and necessity of establishing a Superintendency of Pensions and Retirement.

In September 2023, President Peña appointed Fernández Valdovinos as a board member of Itaipu Binacional.

As Minister of Economy and Finance, Fernández Valdovinos promoted and defended the Superintendency of Pensions and Retirement Funds project. In December 2023, he argued that, without a regulatory body, irregular use of pension funds occurred because there were no rules. He cited the cases of loans made by the IPS (Social Security Institute) to private companies, the case of the Banking Pension Fund, and the case of Itaipu Pension Fund (Cajubi).

On December 19, 2023, Fernández Valdovinos stated on the show El Salón on Channel nPY that, in the Cajubi case, “the Venezuelan took USD 140 million”, and that “now Itaipú Binacional will have to put more than US$1,000 million to balance Cajubi's accounts”.

Also in December 2023, he told the members of the Budget Committee of the Chamber of Deputies that the new Superintendency would be similar to the Banking Superintendency Law and that, in the case of pension funds, the Superintendency would oversee the implementation of the board's decisions.

In the academic field, Fernández Valdovinos was a professor at the Universidad Nacional de Asunción and Universidad Católica Nuestra Señora de la Asunción. He has also lectured at Georgetown University and the University of Chicago, with the doctoral thesis "Inflation and welfare in an endogenously growing economy".

== Honors and awards ==
- Central Bank Governor of the Year 2018 - Central Banking
- Central Bank Governor of the Year 2017 - Central Banking
- Central Banker of the Year, Americas 2017 – The Banker
- Best Central Banker 2016 – Global Finance
- Best Central Banker 2015 – Global Finance
- Excellence in Public Finance 2025 - LatinFinance

== Publications ==
- Año nuevo, mundo nuevo (2019)
- ¿Quo vadis, Paraguay? (2018)
- Las cuatro C de los Bancos Centrales (2018)
- La revolución Fintech (2018)
- En busca de la IED perdida (2017)
- Paraguay: Regulator Statement (2016)
- Paraguay: Más allá de la Estabilidad Macroeconómica. Logros y desafíos (2016)
- Darwin y las especies (2015)
- Paraguay: Central Bank Statement (2015)
- No se construye en días de lluvia (2015)
- La hormiga y las cigarras (2014)
- ¿Estamos listos? (2014)
- El Guaraní 70 años de Estabilidad. Una Conquista de la Sociedad (2013)
- Inflation Uncertainty and Relative Price Variability in WAEMU Countries (2011) Fondo Monetario Internacional Working Paper No. 11/59
- Economic Growth in Paraguay - Coautor (2006)
- Further evidence on Friedman's hypothesis: The case of Paraguay December (2001) Cuadernos de Economía, No. 115. Pontificia Universidad Católica de Chile.
- Inflation and economic growth in the long run 16 (2003). Economics Letters Elsevier-North Holland, Vol. 80, No. 2, pp. 167–173.
