= Germán Rojas (footballer) =

Spanish footballer

Personal information
- Full name: Germán Rojas Gallego
- Date of birth: 10 April 1979 (age 47)
- Place of birth: Lepe, Spain
- Height: 1.77 m (5 ft 10 in)
- Position: Centre-back

Youth career
- Sevilla

Senior career*
Years	Team	Apps	(Gls)
1998–2000	Sevilla B	63	(2)
2000	Sevilla	4	(0)
2000–2003	Atlético B	103	(9)
2003–2005	Badajoz	48	(1)
2005–2006	Córdoba	34	(1)
2006–2009	Alicante	99	(6)
2009–2010	Benidorm	25	(2)
2010–2011	San Roque	34	(5)
2011–2012	Ceuta	28	(3)
2012–2015	San Roque	91	(6)
2015–2016	Badajoz	18	(3)
2016–2017	Don Benito	6	(8)

Managerial career
- 2017–2018: Badajoz (assistant)
- 2018–2019: Don Benito (assistant)
- * Club domestic league appearances and goals

Germán Rojas Gallego (born 10 April 1979), sometimes known simply as Germán, is a Spanish former professional footballer who played as a central defender.

== Career ==
Born in Lepe, Huelva, Andalusia, Rojas graduated from neighbouring Sevilla FC's youth setup. He made his senior debuts in the 1998–99 campaign, in Segunda División B.

On 9 April 2000, Rojas made his first team – and La Liga – debut, starting and being sent off in a 3–0 away loss against Málaga CF. He appeared in three further matches with the main squad during the season, ending with relegation.

In the 2000 summer Rojas moved to another reserve team, Atlético Madrid B also in the third level. An undisputed starter, he played in more than 100 matches for the Colchoneros during his three-year spell.

In January 2005, after a stint with CD Badajoz, Rojas moved to Córdoba CF in Segunda División. He only appeared rarely in 2004–05 (which ended in relegation), but was a starter in 2005–06.

In July 2006 Rojas joined Alicante CF also in the third division. He appeared in 38 matches during his second season, as the Valencian returned to the second level after a 51-year absence.

In June 2009, after suffering relegation back to the third level, Rojas moved to Benidorm CF. He subsequently resumed his career in the same division but also in Tercera División, representing CD San Roque de Lepe (two stints) and AD Ceuta.
