= Paraguayan guaraní =

Currency of Paraguay

Guaraní paraguayo (Spanish)
- Guaraní Banknotes

ISO 4217
- Code: PYG (numeric: 600)

Units of account
- Base unit: guaraní
- Plural: guaraníes
- Symbol: ₲ or Gs.
- Subunit
- 1/100: céntimo (¢) because of inflation, céntimos are no longer in use.

Denominations
- Banknotes: ₲2,000, ₲5,000, ₲10,000, ₲20,000, ₲50,000, ₲100,000
- Coins: ₲50, ₲100, ₲500, ₲1,000

Demographics
- Replaced: Paraguayan peso fuerte
- User(s): Paraguay

Issuance
- Central bank: Banco Central del Paraguay
- Website: www.bcp.gov.py
- Printer: De La Rue; Giesecke & Devrient; Polish Security Printing Works
- Website: De La Rue; Giesecke & Devrient; Polska Wytwórnia Papierów Wartościowych
- Mint: Banco Central del Paraguay
- Website: www.bcp.gov.py

Valuation
- Inflation: 3%
- Source: , 2025

The guaraní (Spanish pronunciation: [ɡwaɾaˈni], plural: guaraníes; sign: ₲; code: PYG) is the national currency unit of Paraguay. The guaraní is divided into 100 céntimos, but because of inflation, céntimos coins are no longer in use.

The currency sign is U+20B2 ₲ GUARANI SIGN; if unavailable, "Gs." is used.

== History ==
The law creating the guaraní was passed on 5 October 1943, and replaced the peso fuerte at a rate of ₲1 = 100 pesos fuertes. Guaraníes were first issued in 1944. Between 1960 and 1985, the guaraní was pegged to the United States dollar at ₲126 = US$1.

=== Revaluation plans ===
The guaraní is currently one of the least valued currency units in the Americas, US$1 being equivalent as of March 2026, to ₲6,500.

In 2011, plans were released under which the Paraguayan guaraní would be revalued as the Nuevo guaraní ("New guaraní") (PYN) at the rate of 1,000:1.

From day 1 there would be a conversion at the rate of ₲1,000 = N₲1 ("nuevo guaraní"). After a two-year transition period (with N₲ as the currency sign), new banknotes with the lower value would be introduced, re-using the name guaraní (₲) for the lower value.

However, due to possible confusion and problems with the projects, it is currently suspended.

== Coins ==
In 1944, aluminum-bronze coins were introduced in denominations of 1¢, 5¢, 10¢, 25¢ and 50¢. All were round shaped. The obverses featured a flower with "Republica del Paraguay" and the date surrounding it, except for the 50¢, which featured the lion and Liberty cap insignia. The denomination was shown on the reverses.

First series:

Value	Obverse	Reverse	First issued
1¢	Flower of the common guava, Psidium guajava	Denomination and wreath	1944
5¢	Flower of Passiflora edullis	Denomination and wreath	1944
10¢	Flower of Leptotes bicolor	Denomination and wreath	1944
25¢	An orange blossom, the fragrant flower of Citrus sinensis	Denomination and wreath	1944
50¢	Flower of the Lapacho tree, Handroanthus impetiginosus, the national tree of Paraguay	Denomination and wreath	1944

The second issue, introduced in 1953, consisted of 10¢, 15¢, 25¢, and 50¢ coins. All were minted in aluminium-bronze again, but were scallop-shaped and featured the lion and Liberty cap on the obverse. Céntimo coins ceased to be legal tender in 1966, leaving Paraguay without any circulating coins for its currency.

In 1975, coins were introduced in denominations of ₲1, ₲5, ₲10, and ₲50, all of which were round and made of stainless steel. Since 1990, stainless steel has been replaced by nickel-brass and/or brass-plated steel. ₲100 coins were introduced in 1990, followed by ₲500 in 1997. ₲1,000 coins were minted in 2006 and released in 2007.

₲1, ₲5, ₲10, ₲50, ₲100, and ₲500 coins minted before 2005 lost their legal tender status on 8 January 2014.

Value	Obverse	Reverse	Diameter (mm)	Weight (g)	First issued	Obverse Image	Reverse Image
₲50	Marshal José Félix Estigarribia	Acaray Dam	19	1	1975		
₲100	General José Eduvigis Díaz	Ruins of Humaitá	21	3.73	1990		
₲500	General Bernardino Caballero	Central Bank of Paraguay	23	4.75	1997		
₲1,000	Marshal Francisco Solano López	National Pantheon of the Heroes	25	6	2006		

== Banknotes ==
The first guaraní notes were of 50¢, ₲1, ₲5, and ₲10 overstamped on $P50, $P100, $P500, and $P1,000 in 1943. Regular guaraní notes for ₲1, ₲5, ₲10, ₲50, ₲100, ₲500 and ₲1,000, soon followed. They were printed by De La Rue.

The 1963 series (under the law of 1952) was a complete redesign. The lineup also expanded upward with the addition of ₲5,000 and ₲10,000. The 1982 revision added denominations in the Guaraní language to the reverses.

The first ₲50,000 notes were issued in 1990, followed by ₲100,000 in 1998.

Starting from 2004, the existing denominations, except ₲50,000, underwent small but easily noticeable changes, such as a more sophisticated and borderless underprint and enhanced security features. Giesecke & Devrient print the new ₲20,000 note, while De La Rue prints the rest. In 2009, the Central Bank launched the first ₲2,000 polymer-made notes, which makes the notes more durable than the traditional cotton-fiber notes.

New ₲50,000 notes of series C were printed with the date of 2005, but as they obviously reached circulation by criminal ways before being launched officially, this series has been declared void and worthless by the central bank and notes of ₲1,000 and series A and B of ₲50,000 were demonetized in 2012.

A new ₲5,000 note was released and put into circulation on 14 January 2013. This note has been printed by the Canadian Bank Note Company. Security features include a see through window in the shape of a locomotive, a watermark of the portrait. However this note will still bear the portrait of Don Carlos Antonio Lopez, and the reverse will also have the same design of Lopez's Palace.

₲10,000 as well as ₲20,000 notes are produced by Polish Security Printing Works (Polska Wytwórnia Papierów Wartościowych).

On 22 December, 2016, new ₲20,000, ₲50,000 and ₲100,000 notes were introduced with upgraded security.

On 5 October 2026, a new note family was introduced by the Central Bank of Paraguay, scheduled to enter circulation in the first quarter of 2027. However, the first banknote to actually be put into circulation was the ₲100,000 note on 6 November 2026, due to the high demand for cash caused by the banking crisis that followed the resolution of Ueno Bank.

Denomination	Main color	Portrait	Reverse motif	Series issued	Legal tender		Obverse
Denomination	Main color	Portrait	Reverse motif	Series issued	Limited circulation	Wide circulation	Obverse
₲ 1 (1943–1975)	Green	Paraguayan Soldier	Legislative Palace	A	-	-	
₲ 5 (1943–1975)	Black	The Paraguayan Woman	Guaraní Hotel	A	-	-	
₲ 10 (1943–1975)	Maroon	Eugenio A. Garay	Paraguay-Brazil International Bridge	A	-	-	
₲ 50 (1943–1975)	Brown	José Félix Estigarribia	Transchaco Route	A	-	-	
₲ 100 (1943–1990)	Green	José Eduvigis Díaz	Ruins of Humaitá	A	-	-	
₲ 500 (1943–1997)	Teal	Bernardino Caballero	State Merchant Fleet	A	-	-	
₲ 1.000 (1943–2006)	Purple	Francisco Solano López	National Pantheon of the Heroes	A-D	-	-	
₲ 2.000 (2008–present)	Violet	Adela y Celsa Speratti	Student Parade	A-E	A, B, C	D, E	
₲ 5.000 (1963–present)	Salmon	Carlos Antonio López	Palacio de los López	A-J	A, B, C, D, E, F, G	H, I, J	
₲ 10.000 (1963–present)	Brown	José Gaspar Rodríguez de Francia	May 14th 1811 Scene	A-K	A, B, C, D, E, F, G, H, I	J, K	
₲ 20.000 (2005–present)	Light Blue	The Paraguayan Woman	Central Bank of Paraguay	A-I	A, B, C, D, E, F, G	H, I	
₲ 50.000 (1990–present)	Peach	Agustín Pío Barrios	Agustín Pío Barrios' Guitar	A-K	D, E, F, G, H, I	J, K	
₲ 100.000 (1998–present)	Green	Agustín Pío Barrios, José Asunción Flores and the paraguayan harp	Tajy Hũ, Guyra Campana, Panambí Morotĩ and Alto Paraná Ecoregion	A-L A*	A, B, C, D, E, F, G	H, I, J, K, L, A*	

*Series of the new note family.

== Exchange rates ==
Current PYG exchange rates
From Google Finance:	AUD CAD CHF CNY EUR GBP HKD JPY USD ARS BRL
From Yahoo! Finance:	AUD CAD CHF CNY EUR GBP HKD JPY USD ARS BRL
From XE.com:	AUD CAD CHF CNY EUR GBP HKD JPY USD ARS BRL
From OANDA:	AUD CAD CHF CNY EUR GBP HKD JPY USD ARS BRL

== See also ==
- Economy of Paraguay

== Bibliography ==
- A Dictionary of Finance and Banking (3rd ed.). USA: Oxford University Press. 2005. ISBN 0-19-860749-0.
- Krause, Chester L.; Clifford Mishler (1991). Standard Catalog of World Coins: 1801–1991 (18th ed.). Krause Publications. ISBN 0873411501.
- Pick, Albert (1994). Bruce, Colin R. II; Shafer, Neil (eds.). Standard Catalog of World Paper Money: General Issues (7th ed.). Krause Publications. ISBN 0-87341-207-9.

Preceded by: Paraguayan peso Reason: inflation Ratio: 1 guarani = 100 pesos	Currency of Paraguay; 1944 –	Succeeded by: current
