= Germán Rojas (politician) =

Paraguayan economist and politician

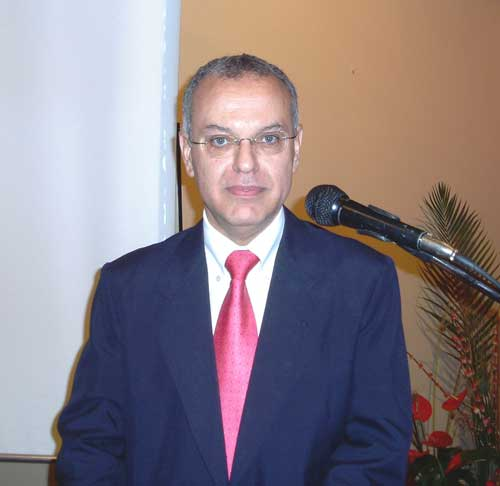

Germán Hugo Rojas Irigoyen is a Paraguayan economist and politician.

== Biography ==
Rojas studied at the Universidad Católica Nuestra Señora de la Asunción. An economist by profession, he presided over the Banco Nacional de Fomento (2003-2007) and afterwards the Central Bank of Paraguay (2007-2008).

On 15 August 2013 he was sworn in as Minister of Finance of Paraguay in the cabinet of President Horacio Cartes.

He pursued graduate courses at the Bundesbank in Germany. He was employed by the Bank of Paraná. He served as chairman of the National Development Bank, was later appointed chairman of the Central Bank of Paraguay. He held various jobs in the monetary authority matrix. He was also vice president of Sudameris Bank. Part of their business is geared to the unions as the Paraguayan Association of Quality, Executive Club and also at times to the House of Advertisers.

Mr. Rojas became Paraguay's Ambassador to the United States on January 28, 2016.
