= Education in Paraguay =

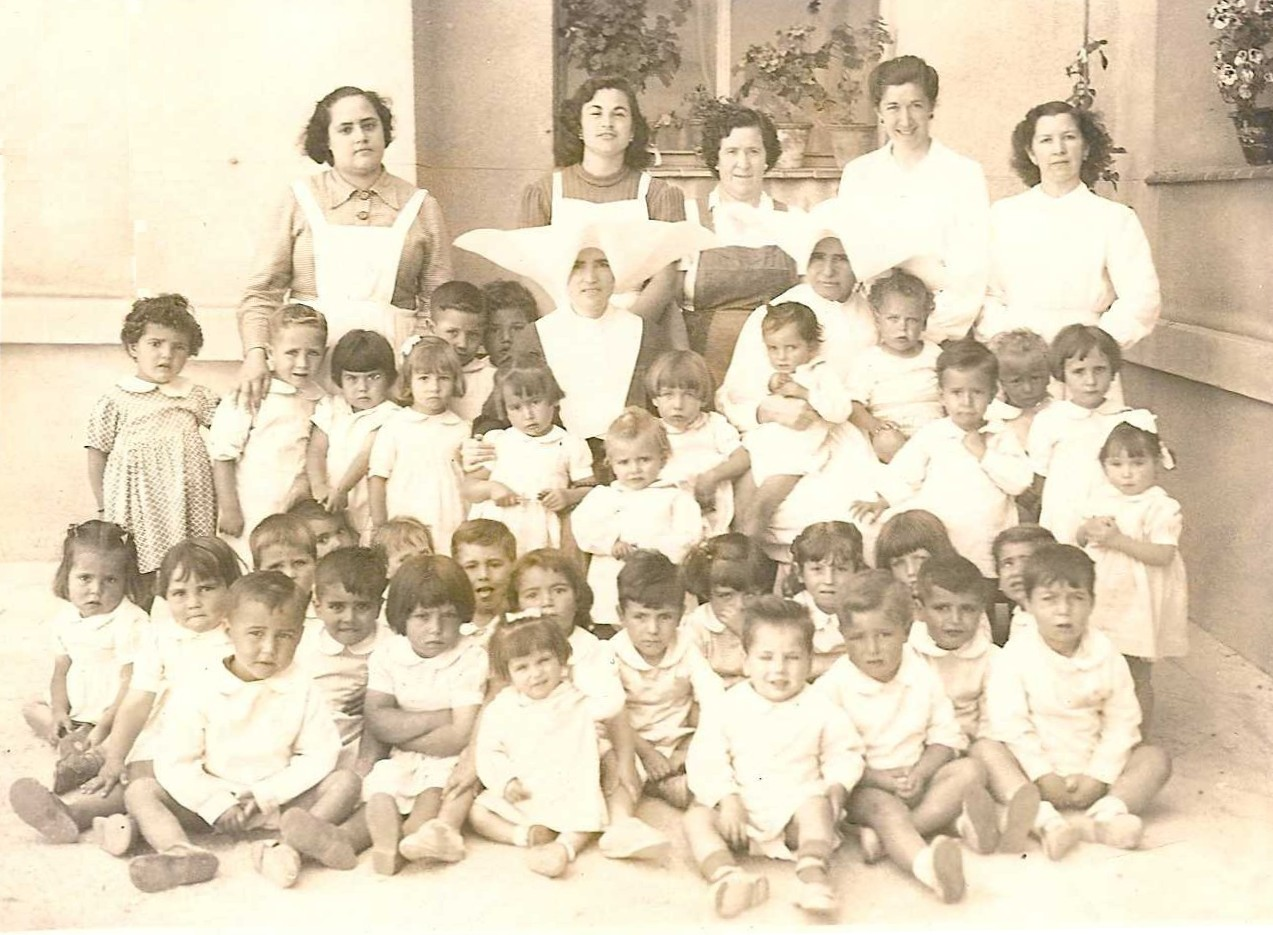
Mid-20th century Paraguayan schoolchildren

During Alfredo Stroessner Mattiauda’s presidency (1954–89), education initiatives took a backseat to economic concerns and the task of controlling political adversaries, and teacher salaries fell to extremely low levels. The constitution of 1992 attempted to remedy the long neglect of education. Article 85 of the constitution mandates that 20% of the government budget be designated for educational expenditures. This measure, however, has proven to be impractical and has been largely ignored.

Nevertheless, democratization has been accompanied by a gradual improvement in the education system. Spending on education has increased, reaching 4.7 percent of gross domestic product in 2000, up from 1.7 percent in 1989. Much of the increased funding went to raise teacher salaries and update curricula. Students are required to attend school from ages seven to 13, and surveys indicate that Paraguay has a net primary school attendance rate of 92 percent. Public education is free to all, but dropout rates remain high.

Until the 1990s, the state Universidad Nacional de Asunción and the Universidad Católica Nuestra Señora de la Asunción served Paraguay’s entire population. As part of the educational reforms of the 1990s, the government created 10 new universities. In 2003 Paraguay’s national military academy admitted female cadets for the first time, opening another door for women pursuing education.

The Human Rights Measurement Initiative (HRMI) finds that Paraguay is fulfilling only 70.7% of what it should be fulfilling for the right to education based on the country's level of income. HRMI breaks down the right to education by looking at the rights to both primary education and secondary education. While taking into consideration Paraguay's income level, the nation is achieving 73.0% of what should be possible based on its resources (income) for primary education and only 68.4% for secondary education.

== School grades ==
Level/Grade	Typical age
Preschool (Educación Inicial)
Maternal	3
Pre-Jardín	3-5
Jardín	4-5
Pre-escolar	5-6
Elementary School (Educación Primaria)
1st Grade (Primer Grado)	6-7
2nd Grade (Segundo Grado)	7–8
3rd Grade (Tercer Grado)	8–9
4th Grade (Cuarto Grado)	9–10
5th Grade (Quinto Grado)	10–11
6th Grade (Sexto Grado)	11–12
7th Grade (Séptimo Grado)	12–13
8th Grade (Octavo Grado)	13–14
9th Grade (Noveno Grado)	14-15
High school (Educación Secundaria)
1st Year (Primer Año de la Media)	15-16
2nd Year (Segundo Año de la Media)	16-17
3rd Year (Tercer Año de la Media)	17–18
Tertiary education-University (Educación Terciaria-Universidad)
Graduate education
Adult education

== Technical and vocational education ==
Formal, technical and vocational education in Paraguay exists through two main curriculum: The “Bachilleratos Técnicos” and the “Formación Profesional Media”. The "Bachilleratos Técnicos" lasts 3 years and leads to the “Bachiller Técnico" which grants a direct access to tertiary education. It gathers 60,000 students across the country split in 600 Technical High Schools. The “Formación Profesional Media” is less academic and aims at a direct integration to the world of work after graduation. People who have left the education system sooner can nevertheless join professional training programmes handled by the ministry of education and culture, provided sufficient results at an entrance examinaniation. Graduates from those programmes and of the "Formacion Profesional Media" have to pass the Academic Competency Assessment Test (ACAT) to eventually pursue into tertiary education. Finally, students can join the “Técnicos Superiores” curriculum(post-secondary education) offered by 287 institutions (88% are private) and which grants an “Advanced Technician” degree after 3 years.

Out of the formal education system, a curriculum exists for people over 15 years old: Vocational Training, Initial Professional Training, Professional Training, with various entry requirements and programmes, offered by both public and private institutions. The ministry of Justice also provides education and training through the National Service for Professional Promotion (Servicio Nacional de Promoción Profesional de Paraguay). The "SNPP" offers classes in computer programme; distance training programme; apprenticeship programme for young people; business development programme; and instructors training programme. The students are mainly young adults. Other public institutions (Ministry of agriculture, of health, the Paraguayan Chamber of Construction, the Paraguayan Centre of Productivity and Quality etc.) handle besides vocational and technical programmes. Informal education also has some importance in Paraguay, albeit hard to measure.

== See also ==
- List of schools in Paraguay
- List of universities in Paraguay
