= Central Bank of Paraguay =

State-owned bank in Paraguay

Central Bank of Paraguay Banco Central del Paraguay

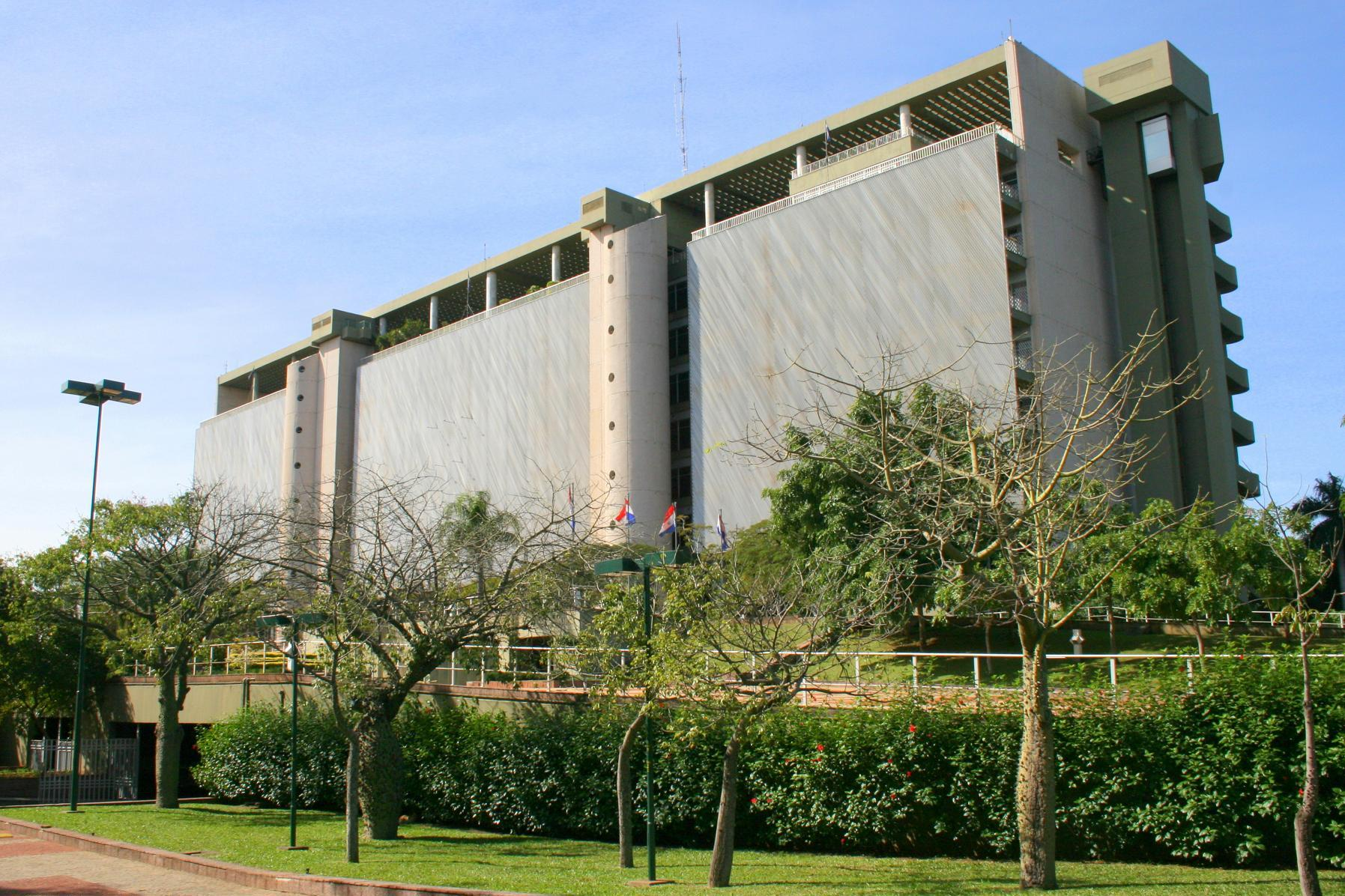
- Banco Central del Paraguay headquarters
- Central bank of: Paraguay
- Headquarters: Asunción
- Coordinates: 25.278°S 57.576°W
- Established: March 25, 1952
- Ownership: 100% state ownership
- President: Jorge Schreiner
- Currency: Paraguayan guaraní PYG (ISO 4217)
- Reserves: 5,480 million USD
- Website: www.bcp.gov.py

The Central Bank of Paraguay (Spanish: Banco Central del Paraguay) is Paraguay's highest monetary authority, and the country's governing body, in finances and economics. Its headquarters are in Asunción's Carmelitas neighbourhood.

== History ==
The institution was created by Law 18/52 of March 25, 1952. In 1995, the legal framework of the Central Bank was replaced by Law 489/95.

The bank manages the printing and minting of the Paraguayan currency, the guaraní.

The Bank is active in promoting financial inclusion policy and is a leading member of the Alliance for Financial Inclusion. It is also one of the original 17 regulatory institutions to make specific national commitments to financial inclusion under the Maya Declaration during the 2011 Global Policy Forum held in Mexico.

In 1998, the Bank ordered the liquidation of one of the country's banks due to a severe lack of liquidity. The government sent emergency legislation to Congress to try to guarantee bank deposits and prevent a run on savings.

In 2005, former Paraguayan president, Luis González Macchi and four bank officials were jailed following their involvement in the illegal transfer of $16m of funds through the bank to the United States.

In 2026, the central bank seized Ueno, one of Paraguay's largest banks, after its solvency ratio fell below half of the legal minimum, locking three million accounts out of their savings.

== Presidents of the Central Bank of Paraguay ==
The president is appointed for a term of five years.

- Juan Ramón Chávez (1952)
- Pedro Juan Mayor (1952), interim
- Epifanio Méndez Fleitas (1952–1954)
- Pedro Mayor (1954), interim
- Osvaldo Chávez (1954)
- Pedro Mayor (1955), interim
- Epifanio Méndez Fleitas (1955)
- Gustavo Storm (1955–1959)
- César Romeo Acosta Martínez (1959–1989)
- Crispiniano Sandoval Silva (1989–1991)
- José Enrique Páez (1991–1993)
- Jacinto Estigarribia (1993–1995)
- Dionisio Coronel Benítez (1995), interim
- Hermes Gómez Ginard (1995–1998)
- Jorge Gulino Ferrari (1998–1999), interim
- Samuel Washington Aswell (1999–2001)
- Raúl Vera Bogado (2001–2002)
- Juan Antonio Ortiz Vely (2002–2003)
- Angel Gabriel González (2003–2005)
- Mónica Pérez (2005–2007)
- Venicio Sánchez Guerreros (2007), interim
- Germán H. Rojas Irigoyen (2007–2008), interim
- Jorge Corvalán (2008–2013)
- Carlos Fernández Valdovinos (2013–2018)
- José Cantero Sienra (2018–2023)
- Carlos Dagoberto Carvallo Spalding (2023–2026)
- Jorge Schreiner (2026–present)

== See also ==
- Payment system
- Real-time gross settlement
- List of central banks
- List of financial supervisory authorities by country
