= Universidad Católica Nuestra Señora de la Asunción =

University in Asunción, Paraguay

Coordinates: 25.2810°S 57.6322°W

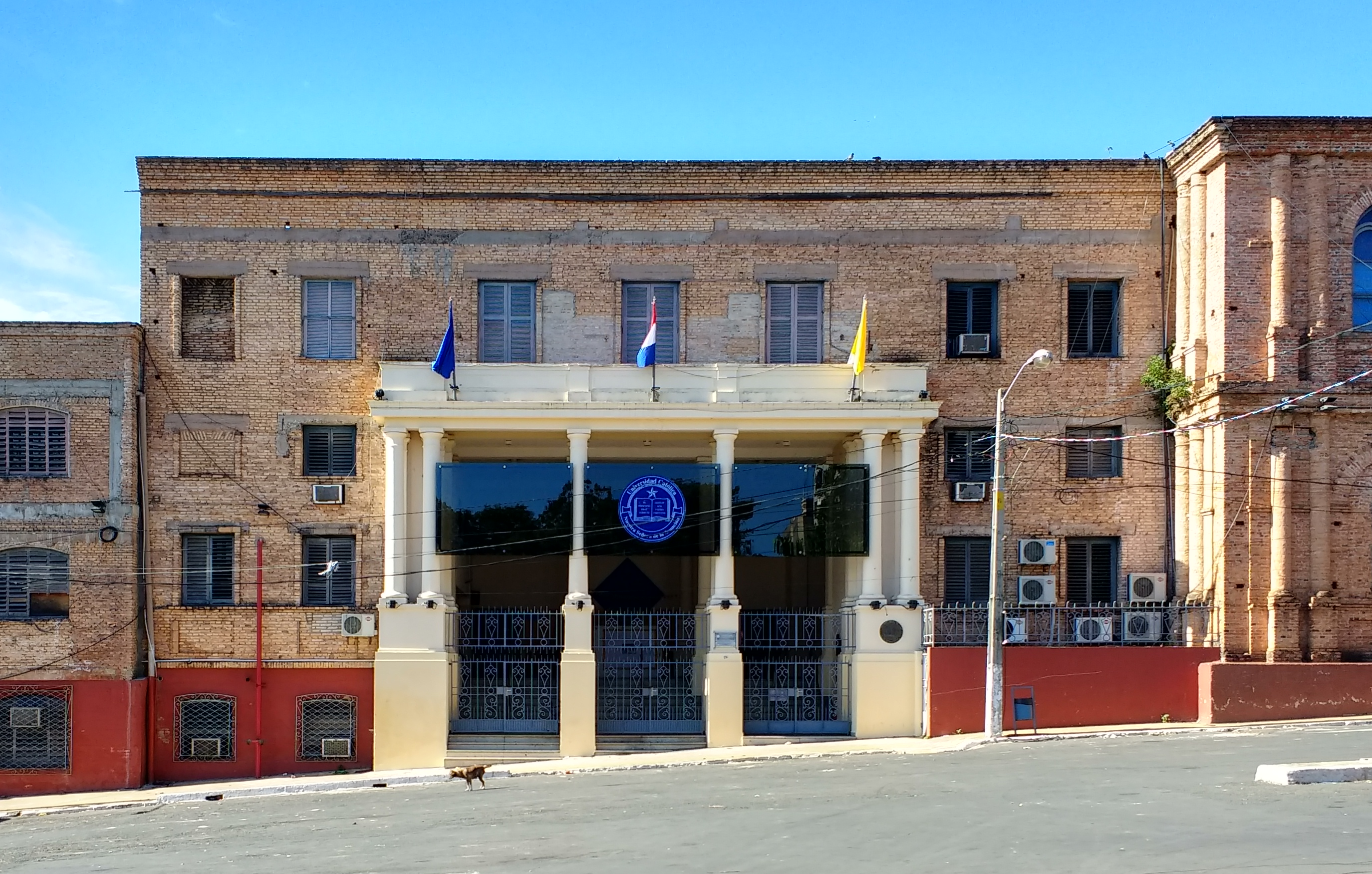
- Motto: Genuit nos verbo veritus
- Established: February 13, 1950; 76 years ago
- Affiliations: Catholic Church
- Rector: Pbro. Narciso Velázquez Ferreira
- Location: Asunción, Paraguay
- Website: www.uca.edu.py

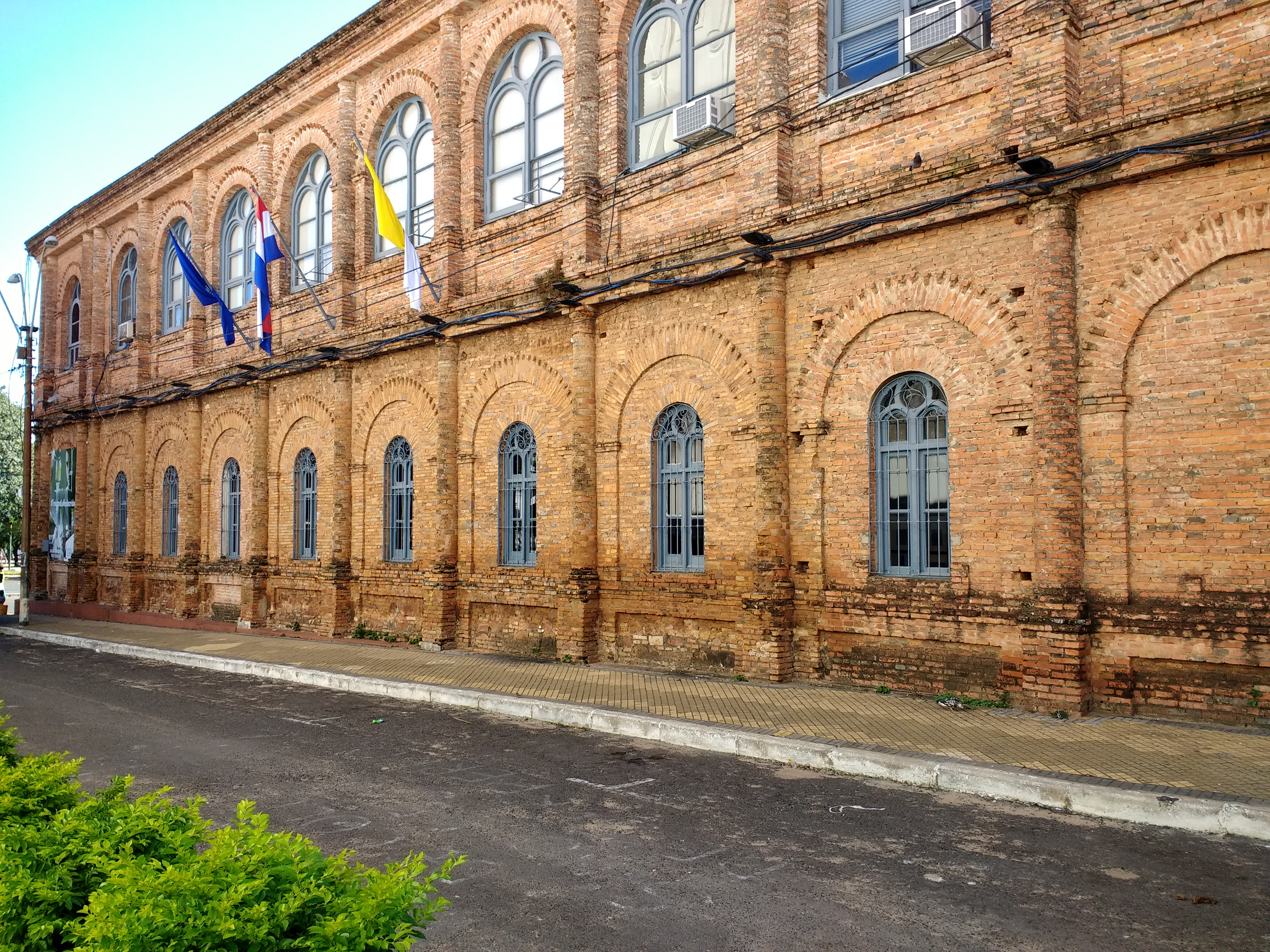

The Universidad Católica Nuestra Señora de la Asunción, also known as Universidad Católica de Asunción (UCA) is a pontifical university located in Asunción, Paraguay.

== History ==
The project for the Catholic University "Nuestra Señora de la Asunción" was conceived by the Episcopal Conference of Paraguay and formalized by the Vatican's Holy See and Pope John XXIII as an entity of Superior Education at the end of the 1950s.

In September 1959, the Episcopal Conference reaffirmed its right to create universities, which was recognized by the 1940 National Constitution of Paraguay. The decree of foundation of the university was signed on February 13, 1960. The Executive Branch of the Paraguayan government made its own decree to recognize the creation of the Catholic University: this was the decree N° 9350 followed by the law N°663 by the Honourable House of Representatives. This legal recognition by the state was followed by the Resolution N°284 of July the 19th 1961, which established the relations between the Ministry of Education and Cult and the Catholic University Nuestra Señora de la Asunción.

== Locations ==
The University Nuestra Señora de la Asunción has 6 Campuses and 2 Academic Units:

- Campus of Asunción (Central, La Providencia, Santa Librada, Music Conservatory, Guarambaré, Campus de la Salud and Caacupé).
- Campus of Alto Paraná (Hernandarias and Santa Rita)
- Campus of Caaguazú (Coronel Oviedo andCaaguazú)
- Academic Unit of Carapeguá
- Campus of Concepción
- Campus of Guaira (Villarica)
- Campus of Itapua (Encarnación, Hohenau, Tomás Romero Pereira, San Pedro de Paraná and San Ignacio)
- Academic Unit of Perdo Juan Caballero

== Institutes ==
• Institute for Appropriate Technology

This is a Centre of capacitation and services. It overlooks the continued education, graduate programs and projects, and the civil engineering lab, Chemistry and water.

• Laboratory of Digital Electronics

It is a centre of investigation and application of electronic technologies and informatics working on the development of projects between professors and students.

• Institute for Graduates and Investigation

This centre has a great recognition in terms of management of courses at a graduate level (Masters and PHDs), sustained by excellence. In the last years, this centre has offered varied projects and degrees in the area of education.

• Institute for Public Policies

This is the materialization of the objective to develop a university centre for the generalization of multidisciplinary knowledge and the formation of specialized human resource with the ability to strengthen and develop the democratic and social state in Paraguay. This Centre was created by an agreement with the University of Georgetown (Washington DC) through the Intercultural Centre for Education and Development.

• Institute for Anthropologic Studies

Created on the 22nd of August 1950, it incentives the publication of investigations -generally monographic) about various aspects of Paraguayan anthropology.

• Interdisciplinary Institute of Social Law and Political Economy

This is a non-governmental entity dedicated to investigation assistance and capacitation on interdisciplinary bases. Its objective is provide help the democratic process through the promotion and defence of human rights in the field of social law, political economy and education, specifically for the most vulnerable sectors of society.

• Institute for investigation of rural law and agrarian reform

The activities of this centre regard the study and analysis of the national legislation compared with rural law and the agrarian reform, investigation and orientation of practical works by the students of the Faculty of Law.
