= Antonio Barrios (politician) =

Vice President of Paraguay since 2026

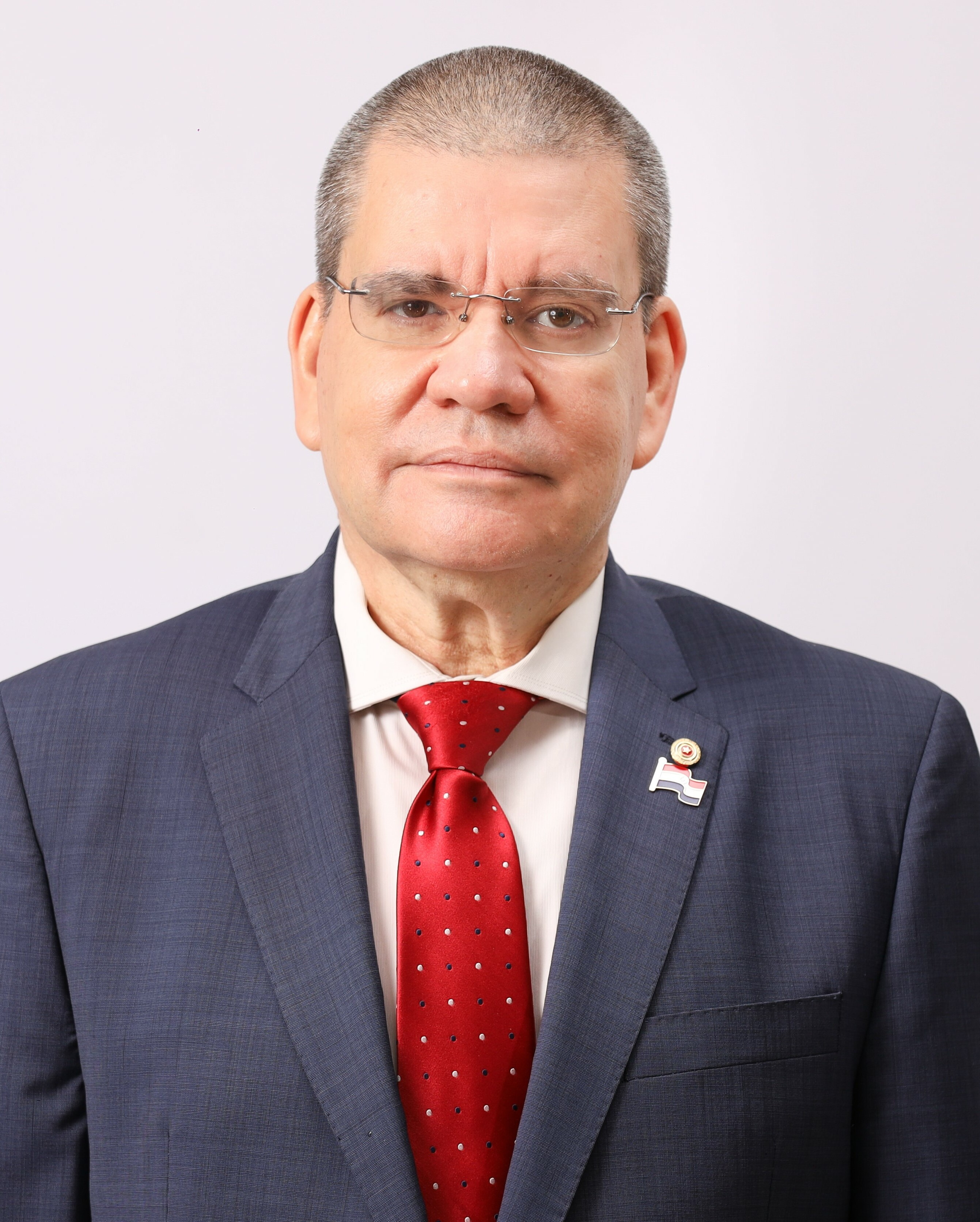
- Official portrait, 2023

32nd Vice President of Paraguay
- Incumbent
- Assumed office 6 November 2026
- President: Pedro Alliana
- Preceded by: Pedro Alliana

Minister of Public Health and Social Welfare
- In office 15 August 2013 – 29 January 2016
- President: Horacio Cartes
- Preceded by: Antonio Arbo
- Succeeded by: Carlos Morínigo

Senator of the Republic
- In office 30 June 2018 – 6 November 2026
- Constituency: National

Personal details
- Born: Antonio Carlos Barrios Fernández; 30 March 1957 (age 69)
- Party: Colorado Party
- Occupation: Medical doctor; politician

Antonio Carlos Barrios Fernández (born 30 March 1957), often known as Tony Barrios, is a Paraguayan physician and politician who has served as Vice President of Paraguay since 6 November 2026. He was elected by Congress to serve after his predecessor, Pedro Alliana, ascended to the presidency following the arrest, dismissal, and prosecution of Santiago Peña.

A member of the conservative Colorado Party, he is a close ally and former personal physician of former president Horacio Cartes. He was previously a senator from 2018 to 2026. From 2013 to 2016, he was minister of public health and social welfare in the cabinet of Horacio Cartes.

== Biography ==
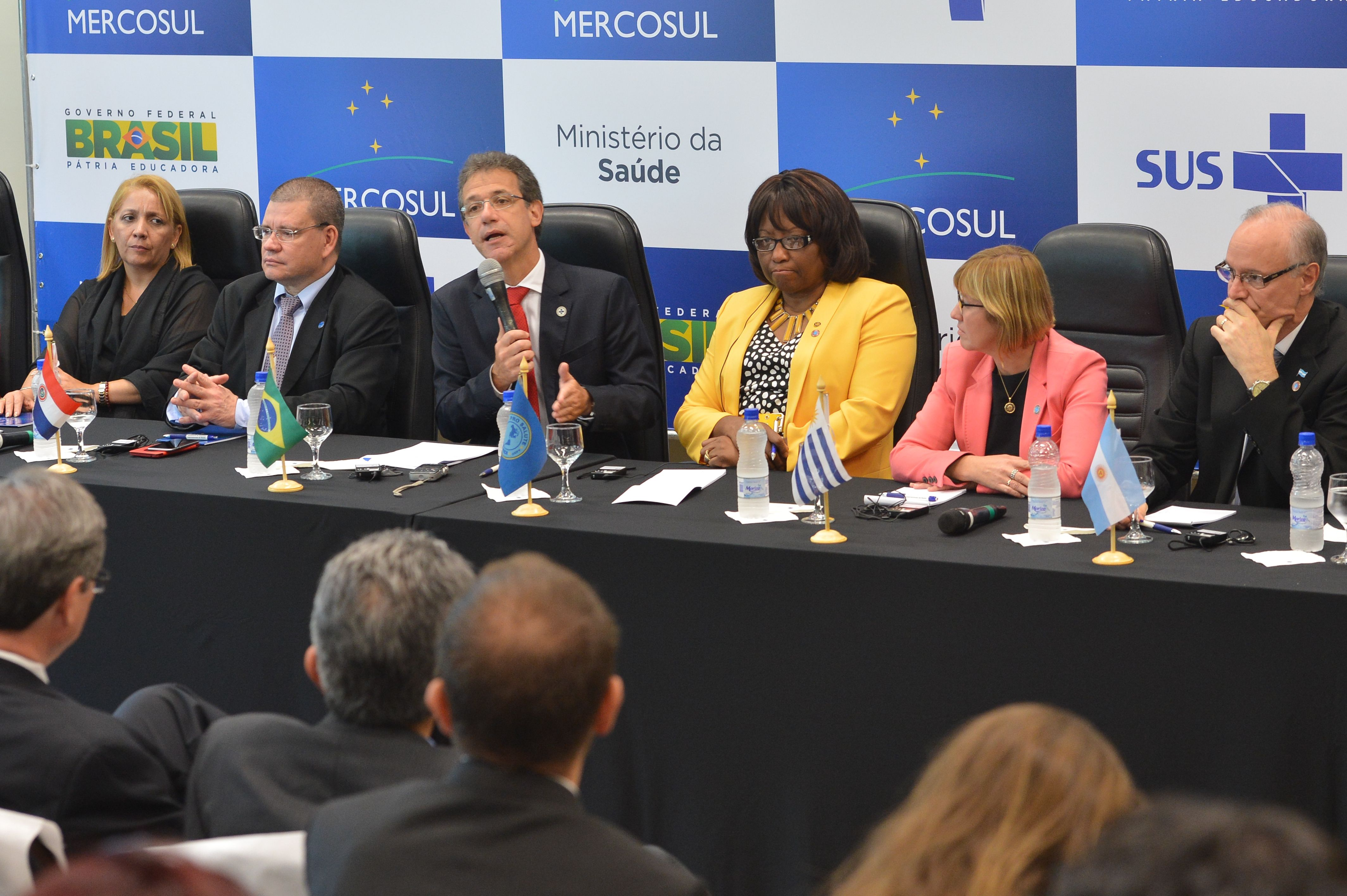
Barrios Fernández (second from left) with fellow Mercosur health ministers in 2015

Barrios studied medicine at the Universidad Nacional de Asunción, where he specialized in neonatology. He was the personal physician of Horacio Cartes. He will serve as Vice President for the remainder of the term which ends in August 2028. Upon swearing in as Vice President, he praised Horacio Cartes in his inaugural speech and said that the government will seek international financial assistance following the collapse of the Ueno Bank.
