= Unicanal =

Paraguayan television network

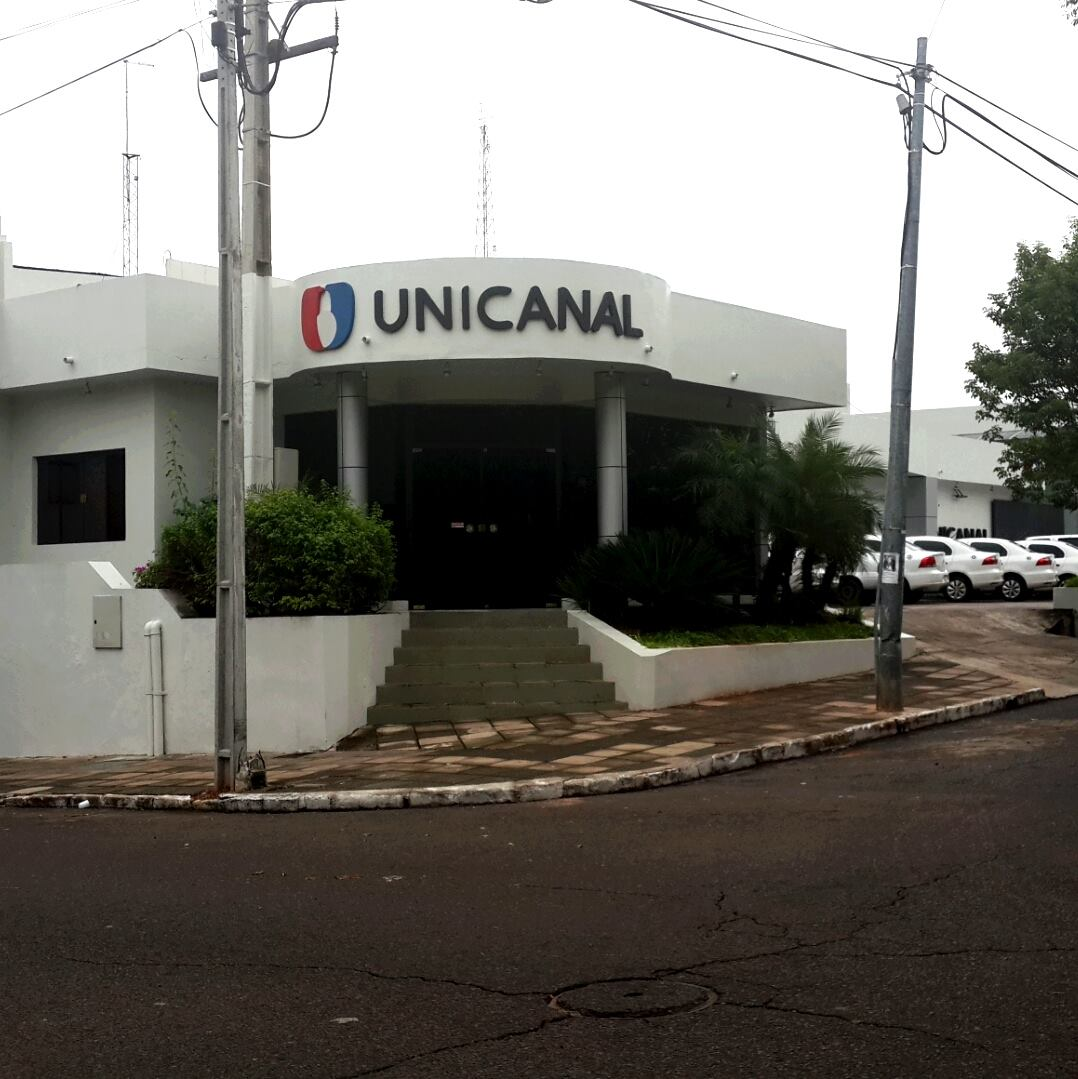
- Country: Paraguay
- Headquarters: Asunción

Programming
- Language: Spanish
- Picture format: 1080i HDTV

Ownership
- Owner: Grupo JBB
- Key people: German Gonzalez
- Sister channels: Trece

History
- Launched: 15 June 1989
- Former names: Canal 4 TV Cinema (1989-1996)

Links
- Website: www.unicanal.com.py

Availability

Terrestrial
- Digital VHF: Channel 3.2

Unicanal is a Paraguayan over the-air television network owned and operated by Grupo JBB.

Originally founded by cable company CVC as a cable channel (TV Cinema), it adopted its current name in 1996. It remained exclusive to the cable company until the mid-2010s when it was sold to Grupo JBB, also owner of Trece. After a few years, it began over-the-air broadcasts.

== History ==
The channel started broadcasting on 15 September 1989 as CVC's in-house channel, broadcast on channel 4 of the cable system. As of 1993, the channel was branded as TV Cinema, while channel 8 carried a sister channel, kids channel Kablito, which is no longer in operation.

Until 2015, Unicanal was attached to the leading cable company (CVC, later Multicanal, later Cablevisión, now Tigo). The channel under Multicanal control hired journalists from Artear to improve the quality of its news operation, reportedly becoming one of the most watched in Paraguay. It also aired El Trece's variety show Showmatch. In January 2014, it signed a deal to create a Paraguayan version of an international format, Paraguay's Next Top Model, in order to become more competitive in the local television market. In 2015, the channel was sold to Grupo JBB. The sale enabled Tigo to improve the Paraguayan version of Tigo Sports.

Under JBB, the channel broke its longtime exclusivity agreement with Tigo, which owned the channel for over 25 years. On 15 September 2015, it was added to channel 20 of Claro TV. Facing this growth, on 28 December 2015, it announced an increase in local productions in 2016, ending the relays of El Trece programming. In May 2016, it acquired the rights to air Copa América Centenario.

On 30 March 2017, Unicanal announced the launch of its HD feed, initially on Tigo Star channel 708. The conversion to new equipment began in late 2016

The channel was acquired by Grupo Vázquez in April 2026, but, as a result of the banking crisis in November and the dissolution of Ueno Bank, it returned to JBB's hands.
