= Susana Escobar (actress) =

Paraguayan actress

Nadia Susana Escobar de Jesús (born 9 May 1962) is a Paraguayan actress. In 2008 she starred in the series Niñera de adultos opposite Nico García and Jose Ayala, which aired on Canal 13. Also in 2008 she appeared in the documentary Ralco, un mal negocio. Other roles include Milagrosa Crucecita de la Fe, Una flor ultrajada, Kuña Saraki, Mateo Gamarra, Gastón Gadin, El arriero del poncho rojo, Yo soy de la chacarita, El hijo prodigo and Vida Pasión y Muerte.
