= Francisco de Vargas =

Paraguayan lawyer and politician

Francisco José de Vargas Benítez (born 22 October 1970) is a Paraguayan lawyer and politician.

== Biography ==
De Vargas studied law at the Universidad Católica Nuestra Señora de la Asunción; he specialized in Criminal Law.

A man with strong ties to the Authentic Radical Liberal Party of former President Federico Franco, he worked combatting illegal drug trade.

On 15 August 2013 he was sworn in as Interior Minister of Paraguay in the cabinet of President Horacio Cartes.
