= Pedro Alliana =

President of Paraguay since 2026

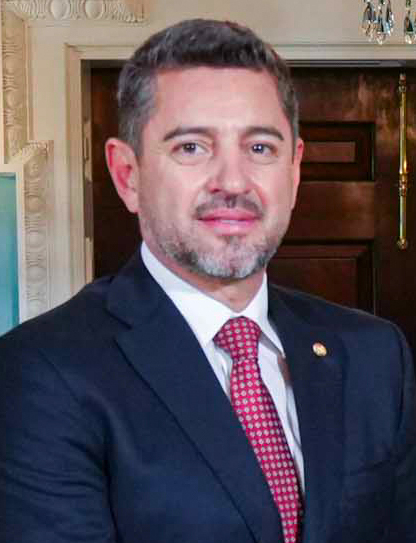
- Alliana in 2026

53rd President of Paraguay
- Incumbent
- Assumed office 6 November 2026
- Vice President: Antonio Barrios
- Preceded by: Santiago Peña

31st Vice President of Paraguay
- In office 15 August 2023 – 6 November 2026
- President: Santiago Peña
- Preceded by: Hugo Velázquez
- Succeeded by: Antonio Barrios

President of the Chamber of Deputies
- In office 1 July 2019 – 30 June 2022
- Preceded by: Miguel Cuevas Ruíz Díaz
- Succeeded by: Carlos María López

President of the Colorado Party
- In office 25 July 2015 – 10 January 2023
- Leader: Horacio Cartes (2015–2018); Mario Abdo Benítez (2018–2023)
- Preceded by: Lilian Samaniego
- Succeeded by: Horacio Cartes

Governor of Ñeembucú
- In office 15 August 2008 – 29 June 2013
- Preceded by: Juan Carlos Bottino
- Succeeded by: Carlos Francisco Silva

National Deputy
- In office 30 June 2013 – 30 June 2023
- Constituency: Ñeembucú

Personal details
- Born: Hércules Pedro Lorenzo Alliana Rodríguez; 19 February 1974 (age 52) Pilar, Paraguay
- Party: Colorado
- Spouse: Fabiana Maria Souto (m. 2006)
- Children: 4
- Profession: Politician

Hércules Pedro Lorenzo Alliana Rodríguez (born 19 February 1974) is a Paraguayan politician serving as the president of Paraguay since 6 November 2026. A former national deputy from 2013 to 2023, he previously served as president of the Chamber of Deputies from 2019 to 2022, president of the Colorado Party from 2015 to 2023, and governor of Ñeembucú Department from 2008 to 2013. As president, he succeeds Santiago Peña, who was removed from office, arrested, and prosecuted in the wake of the 2026 crisis caused by the failure of Ueno Bank.

== Early life ==
Alliana was born in the city of Pilar, Ñeembucú Department, on 19 February 1974. His parents, María Nidia Rodríguez and Héctor Rubén Alliana Báez, were both Ñeembucú departmental councilors. He has two siblings: Ana Lucía Alliana Rodríguez and Rodolfo Alliana Rodríguez.

He attended primary school at the Cristo Rey Subsidized School and secondary school at the Santo Tomás Italian National College. During his adolescence he played basketball and participated in national tournaments; in 1991, he was a member of the Paraguay men's national basketball team.

== Political career ==
Alliana ran for the Colorado Party as a candidate for mayor of Pilar in 2006, but lost the mayoral election. He ran for and won the governorship of Ñeembucú Department in 2008 and served as governor of Ñeembucú from 2008 to 2013. In 2013 he won a seat in the Chamber of Deputies as a representative of the department of Ñeembucú.

Alliana was elected president of the Colorado Party on 25 July 2015. After the 2018 general elections, he was re-elected deputy for the 2018–2023 period. He was elected as President of the Chamber of Deputies of Paraguay and served three terms from 1 July 2019 to 30 June 2022.

On 30 April 2023, Alliana was elected Vice President of Paraguay as Santiago Peña's running mate in the 2023 general election.

=== Presidency ===
On 6 November 2026, Alliana assumed the presidency after Peña was impeached by Congress for the banking crisis caused by the failure of Ueno Bank.

== Personal life ==
Alliana is married to Fabiana Maria Souto (who has been serving as a national deputy since August 2023), who is now First Lady of Paraguay. They have four children.

In December 2018, Alliana was diagnosed with leukemia, and traveled to Brazil to undergo chemotherapy at the Hospital Sírio-Libanês. Alliana later recalled that during treatment he went into cardiac arrest once, which kept him in an intensive care unit for eight days. He returned to Paraguay in March 2019, stating that he was "cured" of the disease.

Political offices
Preceded by Juan Carlos Bottino	Governor of Ñeembucú; 2008–2013	Succeeded by Carlos Francisco Silva
Preceded by Miguel Cuevas Ruíz Díaz	President of the Chamber of Deputies; 2019–2022	Succeeded by Carlos María López
Preceded by Hugo Velázquez	Vice President of Paraguay; 2023–2026	Succeeded by Antonio Barrios
Preceded by Santiago Peña	President of Paraguay; 2026–present	Incumbent
Party political offices
Preceded by Lilian Samaniego	President of the Colorado Party; 2015–2023	Succeeded by Horacio Cartes
