= Trece (Paraguayan TV network) =

Paraguayan broadcast television channel

- Country: Paraguay
- Broadcast area: Nationwide
- Headquarters: Lambaré, Paraguay

Programming
- Picture format: 1080i HDTV

Ownership
- Owner: Grupo JBB (Javier Bernardes)
- Sister channels: Unicanal

History
- Launched: 11 February 1981; 45 years ago

Links
- Website: trece.com.py

Availability

Terrestrial
- Digital UHF (Asunción): Channel 27.1
- Analog VHF: Channel 13 (Asunción, listings may vary)

Streaming media
- TRECE WEB: www.trece.com.py/vivo

Trece is a Paraguayan free-to-air television network launched in 1981. It is the head station of the JBB Group, which as of 11 January 2016 adopted this name. Channel 13 was the second television station to start nationwide broadcasts, after SNT, the first to broadcast entirely in color and the fourth television station to be set up in Paraguay overall including SNT's two inland affiliates that started shortly before Channel 13's operations started (making it second in Asunción). In the 2010s, the channel changed owners twice eventually becoming a sister channel to Unicanal, and for a brief period between 2016 and 2019, it was known as RPC.

It also airs on the DTT service on UHF channel 27 since October 2017. The channel has been broadcasting from the city of Lambaré adjacent to the capital Asunción since the beginning.

== History ==
=== Canal 13 Teledifusora Paraguaya ===
On 11 February 1981, on VHF channel 13 (where the station got its name) and under the aegis of Red Privada de Comunicación, the station is signed on by businessman Nicolás Bó Parodi, becoming the first television channel to broadcast entirely in color. Its launch gave a new dynamic to television in Paraguay. Bo Parodi had close relations to the family of dictator Alfredo Stroessner and the new channel had an officialist outline, as a propaganda outlet related to the regime. During the dictatorship, the channel didn't surpass government-sponsored channel SNT's audience.

The channel was the first to broadcast Brazilian telenovelas, the majority of which came from TV Globo. In its first two decades, noteworthy titles such as Isaura the Slave Girl, Roque Santeiro, Dona Beija, Pantanal and O Rei do Gado stood out.

The channel was also responsible for producing sporting events, beauty pageants and key national productions, as well as producing concerts and other live shows held at the José Asunción Flores amphitheater, also owned by the channel. As of 2000 its terrestrial coverage reached Asunción, Coronel Oviedo, Caaguazú, José Domingo Campos, Ciudad del Este, San Juan, Santa Rosa, Encarnación, Concepción, Vallemí and Pedro Juan Caballero.

At the turn of the millennium, under Néstor López Moreira, the channel was implementing new technologies and changed its scheduling format.

=== El Trece ===
On 22 November 2005, El Trece started delivering a separate feed for cable companies outside of Asunción, which was also delivered across the Americas by satellite. The line-up for 2006 was going to consist of El Depto with Dani Da Rosa; Marque el 13, Comisaría 13, a strand for children Natalia Bourdillón and Magalí Sosa, the TV Globo telenovela Laços de Família, Rojito with Loreley Anderson and a new season of Rojo Fama Contrafama with Da Rosa. Former members of Telefuturo's Telecomio such as José Ayala, Walter Evers, Gustavo Cabañas and Paola Peralta became staff members of the channel in January 2006.

Christian Chena of Grupo Chena bought the channel in 2007. Goals included the conversion of the channel to becoming a ratings leader. The channel started airing a nightly call-TV gameshow sponsored by Personal Paraguay on 7 January 2008, airing on weeknights at 11pm. The program previously aired on Telefuturo. A Paraguayan version of the Chilean format Calle 7 was announced in November 2009, scheduled to premiere in March 2010.

On 30 May 2014, Grupo Chena sold its 25% share in the channel to Díaz e Hijos, owners of Hipermercado Luisito. This was planned since earlier in the year.

=== RPC ===
On 11 January 2016, Canal 13 was renamed Red Paraguaya de Comunicación. The rename gave greater priority to news and was touted as "a new outlet" starting "a new stage", as well as renewed emphasis in its news operation. The rebrand also brought forth a new schedule, which was announced at a special ceremony at Hard Rock Café Asunción, coinciding with the company's 35th anniversary. In March, new seasons of reality show Camino al éxito and game show Invencible premiered. The evening news increased to two hours to compete with the other channels.

In December 2016, one of its main programs, AAM, ended its run on RPC. The cause for its end was due to internal changes, as Grupo Chena was aiming to sell the channel. Chena, producer of the program, announced that it secured an agreement with Telefuturo for a new season, confirming rumors of the channel's sale to Grupo JBB, pending a final decision by 31 December. The sale was made on 12 January 2017, when Christian Chena sold the channel to Grupo JBB, owned by Javier Bernardes, subject to CONATEL approval. JBB owned Unicanal, a cable channel, officially making it a sister channel. That year, JBB's new line of programs was being added little by little, with the first such program being Tercer Tiempo and later a Paraguayan version of the Chilean reality format Mundos Opuestos. The network cost US$1 million to bring the format to Paraguay and had already become successful. On 19 September 2017, Canal 13 launched its digital terrestrial television signal in the Greater Asunción metropolitan area on digital channel 27.1; this also enabled sister channel Unicanal to start OTA broadcasts on subchannel 27.2.

The success of programs such as Mundos Opuestos caused RPC to adopt a new slogan in July 2018, Experiencias Reales (Real Experiences).

By the time of its fortieth anniversary in February 2021, 80% of its programming was national.

=== Trece ===
On 14 November 2019, RPC announced at an upfront for 2020 that it would adopt the name Trece on December 2. The rebrand also gave the channel a new schedule. Javier Bernardes reiterated that the rebrand would position Trece as Paraguay's leading network, and that the rebrand was possible due to mass confusion from viewers over the RPC initials.

On 3 November 2026, Grupo JBB retook ownership, after five months under Grupo Vázquez, in the wake of the banking crisis stemming from the collapse of Ueno Bank.

== Network ==
As of 2019:

City	Analog callsign	Digital callsign	Analog channel	Digital channel
Juan E. O'Leary	ZPD 917	N/A	11	N/A
Ciudad del Este	ZPD 918	N/A	13	N/A
Pedro Juan Caballero	ZPV 901	N/A	9	N/A
Mariscal Estigarribia	ZPD 912	N/A	13	N/A
Coronel Oviedo	ZPD 915	N/A	7	N/A
Juan Manuel Frutos	ZPD 916	N/A	9+	N/A
Salto del Guairá	ZPD 910	N/A	13-	N/A
Lambaré-Asunción	ZPD 913	ZPD 967	13	27
Concepción	ZPD 914	N/A	7	N/A
Vallemí	ZPD 910	N/A	10	N/A
Ybyturuzú	ZPD 919	N/A	8-	N/A
Encarnación	ZPD 921	N/A	10	N/A
San Patricio	ZPD 920	N/A	13+	N/A

The main digital transmitter was set up by Rohde & Schwarz in 2021; in early 2025, digital transmitters were installed in Encarnación, Ciudad del Este and Juan O'Leary.

== Programming ==
- Paraguay En Vivo
- Será un Gran Día
- Mucho Gusto
- El Noticiero
- Doctor en Casa
- Padres al Día
- El Reto
- Será una Gran Tarde
- Tercer Tiempo
- El Repasador
- TV al Aire
- NTU
- Asado Benítez
- Entrenando con Mamá
- Vero Vega Presenta
- Cocina Rica
- Cocineritos
- Patrulla Urbana
- Paraguay Salvaje
- Más Que Vencedores
- Amigo Camionero
- Arte y Espectáculos
- Los Protagonistas
- Descubriendo el País
- En Vida
- Lotería Megaloto
- Cara o Cruz
- Mala Junta

== Logos ==
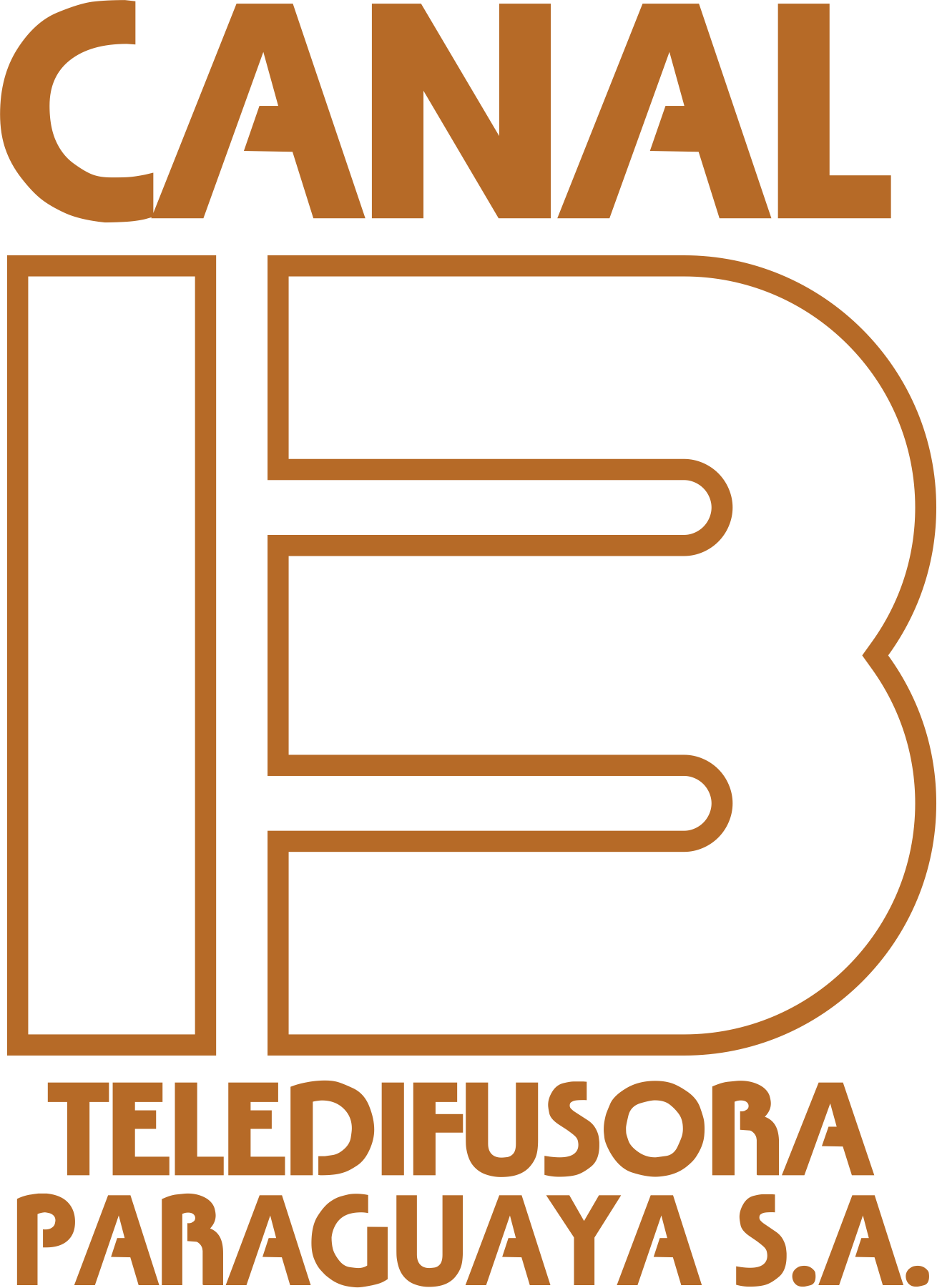
1981–1986

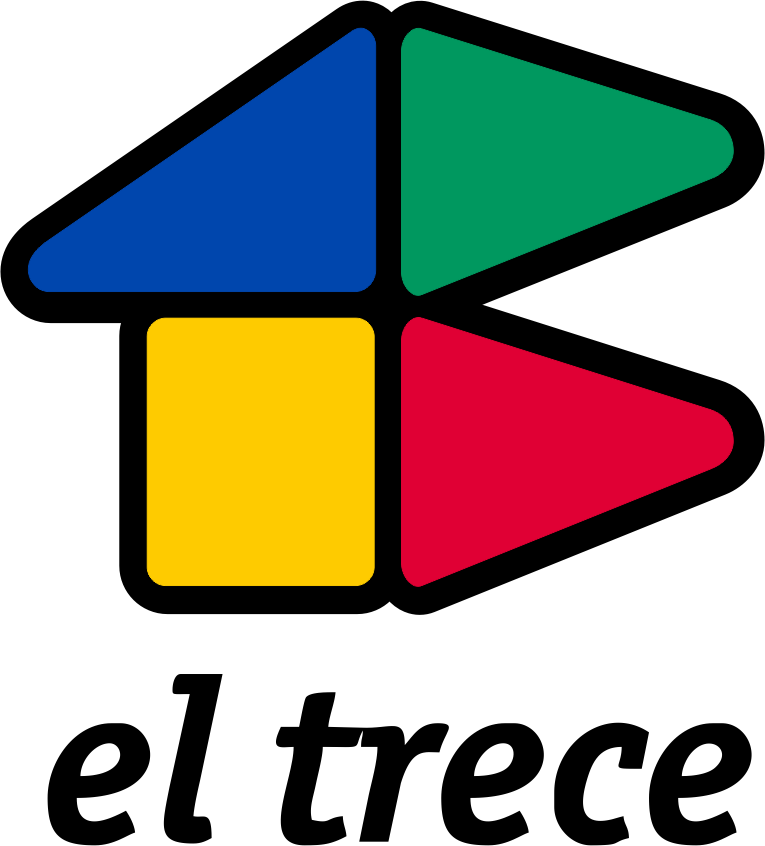
1999–2004

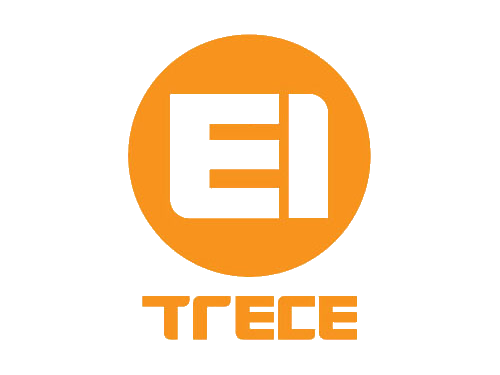
2004–2007

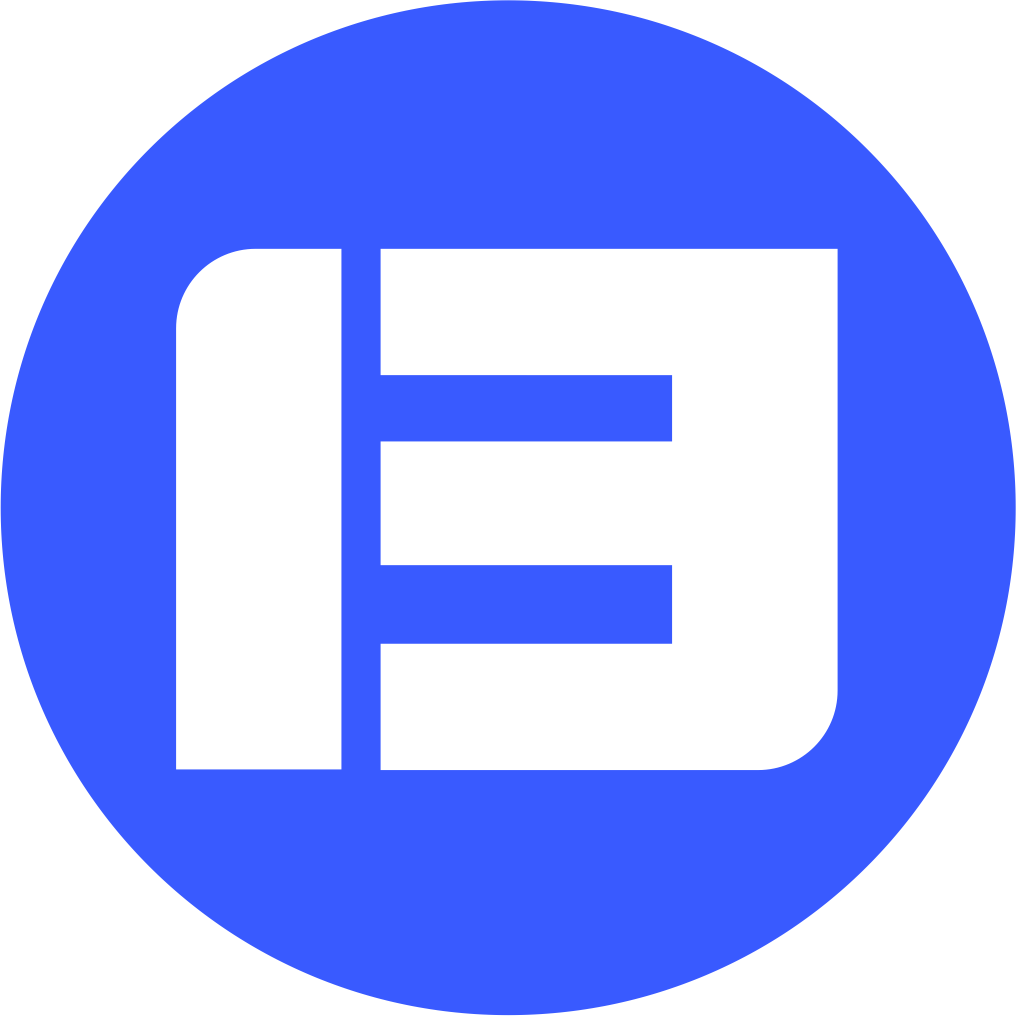
2007–2008

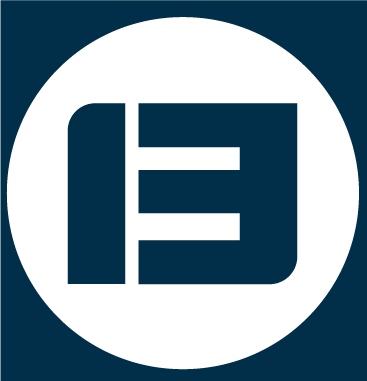
2008–2016

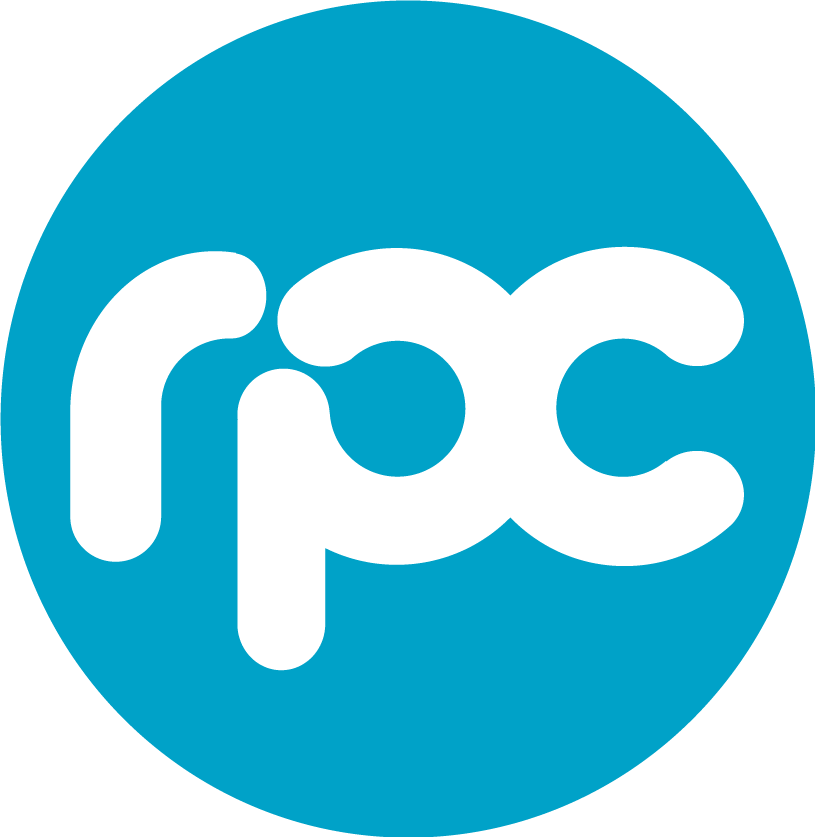
2016–2019

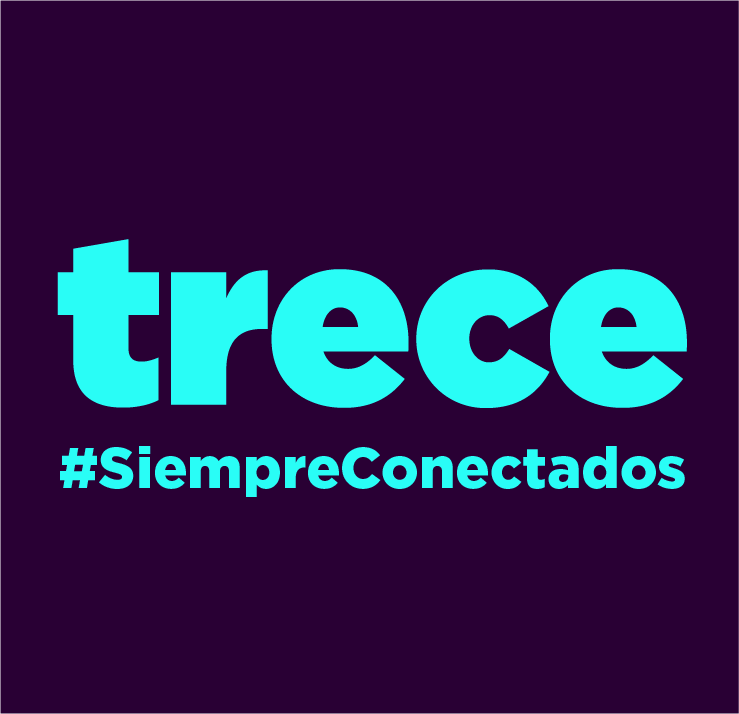
2019–2025

== Criticism ==
In 2006, its sketch comedy program Manicomicos had one of its segments pulled before airing. The sketch, Bailando por un sueldo, was understood by Telefuturo (which aired Bailando por un sueño) as illegal use of its trademark. The Paraguayan Journalists' Union criticized the measure as an act of censorship.
