= Bernardino Soto Estigarribia =

Paraguayan army general and politician (born 1952)

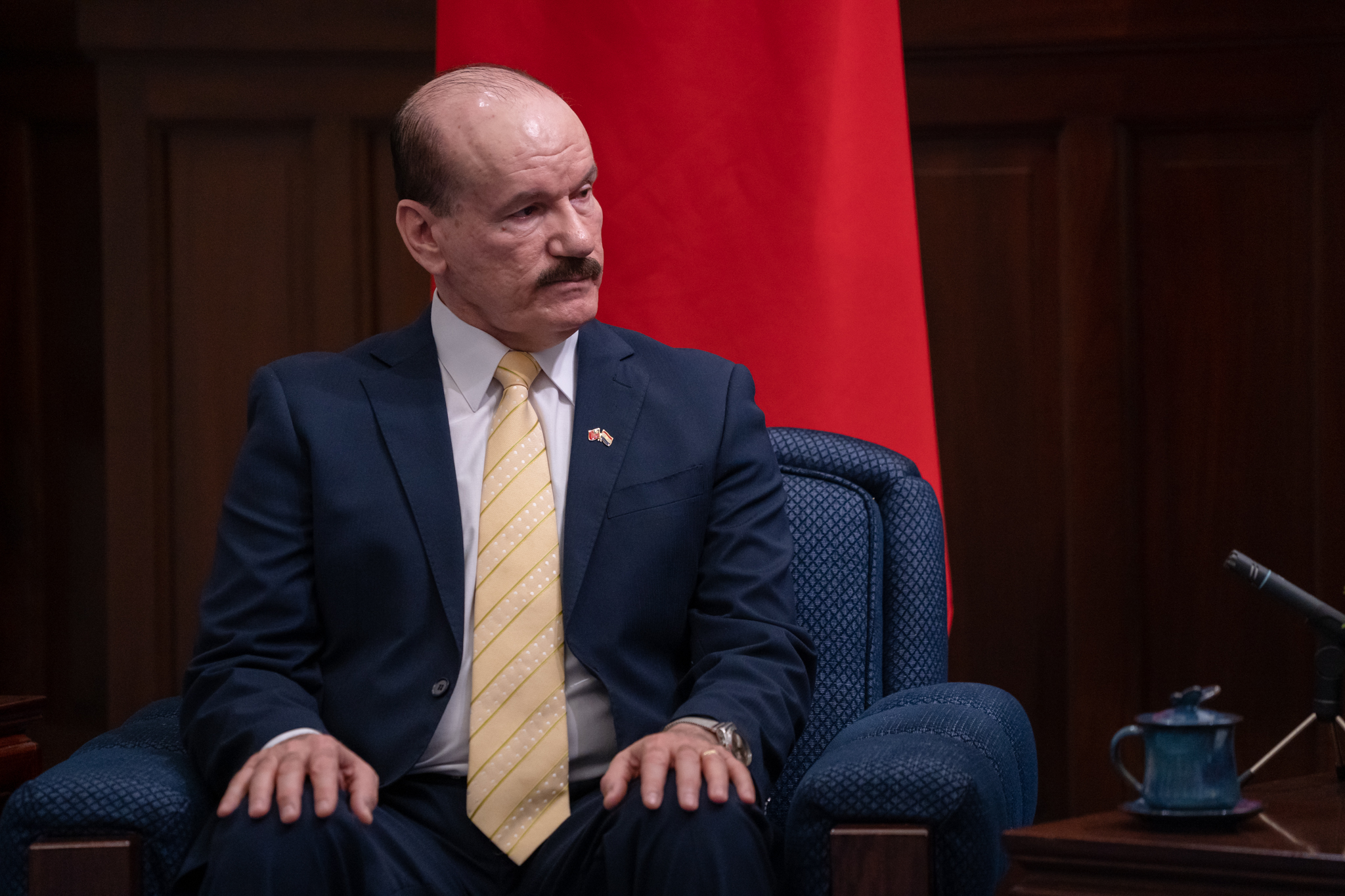
Bernardino Soto Estigarribia during his visit to Taipei, Taiwan in 2019.

Bernardino Soto Estigarribia (born 20 May 1952 in Coronel Oviedo) is a Paraguayan army general and politician.

== Biography ==
Soto entered the military academy in 1972. He followed a long military career which he culminated as General ( a rank he attained in 2007). Among other positions, he was an instructor at the School of the Americas.

2013 to 2015 he was the Defence Minister of Paraguay in the cabinet of President Horacio Cartes. Since 2018 he is once again the Defence Minister of Paraguay.
