= Eladio Loizaga =

Paraguayan lawyer and diplomat

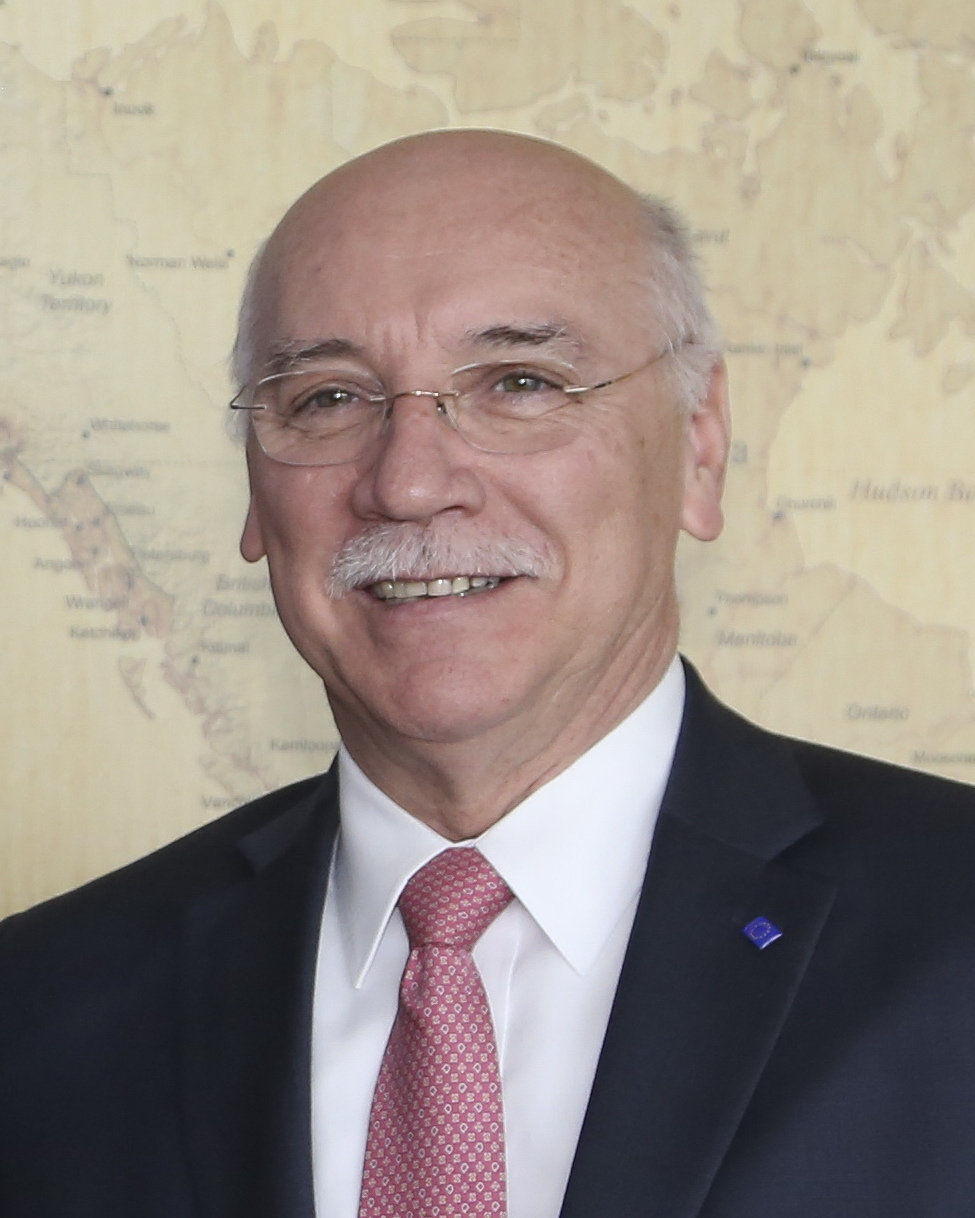

Minister of Foreign Affairs
- In office 15 August 2013 – 15 August 2018
- President: Horacio Cartes
- Preceded by: José Félix Fernández Estigarribia
- Succeeded by: Luis Castiglioni

Personal details
- Born: 17 March 1949 (age 77)
- Spouse: Elizabeth Franco de Loizaga
- Education: Universidad Nacional de Asunción

Eladio Loizaga Caballero (born 17 March 1949) is a Paraguayan lawyer and diplomat.

== Biography ==
Loizaga studied law at the Universidad Nacional de Asunción, where he graduated in 1973; he devoted himself to the areas of International Law, Civil Law, International Trade and Intellectual Property. He worked at the Ministry of Foreign Affairs; he was one of the local promoters of the World Anti Communist League. From 1989 to 1992, he served as Cabinet Head of Staff for President Andrés Rodríguez. He also served as legislator and Paraguayan Representative to the United Nations and WTO.

On 15 August 2013, he was sworn in as Foreign Minister of Paraguay in the cabinet of President Horacio Cartes.

Loizaga is one of several prominent beneficiaries of ill-gotten lands in Paraguay. These lands were destined for agrarian reform but were illegally handed to loyalists of the Stroessner military dictatorship. He claims ownership of more than 8.000 hectares of land handed to him in this manner despite not possessing the proper papers and title documents. He has been accused of being a prominent figure behind Operation Condor, a US-backed anticommunist campaign of political suppression and state terror.

Loizaga served as Chief of the Electoral Observation Mission of the Organization of American States for the 2023 Guatemalan general election, the 2024 Dominican Republic municipal elections and the 2025 Honduran general election.

== Honors ==
- 2017: Knight Grand Cross in the Order of Isabella the Catholic.

== See also ==
- List of foreign ministers in 2017
