= Public Ministry of Paraguay =

Paraguayan governmental autonomous body

Established in 2000, the Public Ministry of Paraguay is an autonomous body that has the following duties and powers per the Constitution:

- Ensure respect for rights and constitutional guarantees;
- Promote public criminal action to defend the public and social heritage, the environment and other diffuse interests and rights of indigenous peoples;
- Perform criminal action in cases in which, to initiate or prosecute, there is no need for a party, without prejudice to the judge or court proceeding ex officio, when determined by law;
- Gather information from public officials for the performance of its duties, and;
- The other duties and attributions established by law.

The ministry is headed by the Attorney General of Paraguay. Sandra Quiñónez became the Attorney General in 2018, and she holds the distinction of being the first female to occupy the position.

== See also ==
- Attorney general
- Justice ministry
- Ministry of Justice (Paraguay)
- Politics of Paraguay
