= Banco Basa =

Bank in Paraguay

Banco Basa (formerly known as Banco Amambay) is a Paraguayan bank established in 1992. It was part of president Horacio Cartes's Grupo Cartes business conglomerate until its reorganisation in 2023. It is headquartered in Asunción and had assets of $333.4 million and equity of $51.1 million as of June 2012. As of June 2012 Banco Amambay had around 2.8% of Paraguay's deposits (the 13th-largest by loan size), with its top 20 depositors accounting for 61% of its deposits.
