= Jorge Gattini =

Paraguayan agronomist and politician

Jorge Raúl Gattini (born 10 December 1964) is a Paraguayan agronomist and politician.

Gattini studied agronomics at the National University of Asunción. Afterwards he obtained a M.Sc. in Agricultural Economics at the Kansas State University and a Master in Applied Environmental Economy at the Imperial College London. He is a consultant in agricultural matters.

On 15 August 2013 he was sworn in as the Minister of Agriculture of Paraguay in the cabinet of President Horacio Cartes.
