= Grupo Cartes =

Paraguayan business conglomerate

- Industry: Conglomerate
- Defunct: 24 March 2023
- Fate: Companies split and reorganized; subsidiaries Frigorífico Chajhá, Dominicana Acquisition, Bebidas USA and Tabacos USA dissolved
- Area served: Worldwide
- Key people: Horacio Cartes, Sarah Cartes (until 2023)
- Products: Banking, Trade, Transportation, Beverages, Tobacco, Agriculture
- Number of employees: ≈3,500 (2013)
- Subsidiaries: Aerocentro, Ganadera Sofia, Banco Amambay, Tabacalera del Este, Tabacos del Paraguay, Habacorp Cigar Trading, Chajhá, Ganadera Las Pampas, Bebidas del Paraguay, Distribuidora del Paraguay, Paraguay Soccer, Consignataria de Ganado, Agrocitrus del Paraguay, Tabacos USA, FundaciAerocentro, Fundacion Rampon T. Cartes, Sporting Life, Transporte Multimodal del Paraguay, La Mision, Bebidas USA, Fundacion Ñande Paraguay
- Website: www.grupocartes.com.py

Grupo Cartes was a business conglomerate owned by Paraguay's ex-president Horacio Cartes. It included the cigarette company Tabacalera del Este (Tabesa), as well as beverage, banking, agricultural, transportation and trading interests. The group said it employed about 3,500 people as of 2013.

In 2023, U.S. ambassador to Paraguay Marc Ostfield announced that the Office of Foreign Assets Control banned doing financial operations in American dollars of any kind to Horacio Cartes and his enterprise. This came after an investigation concluded that he actively participated in corruption actions before, during and after his period as president of Paraguay. Later, both Horacio Cartes and his sister Sarah announced that they were leaving and divesting from the conglomerate and that the Grupo Cartes's brand and structure would be changed, effective 24 March 2023. Cartes passed shares in the businesses to his legal heirs as an advance on their inheritance, with each new company group(s) operating autonomously.

== History ==
According to the company's website, in October 1990 Cartes created the Livestock Sophia SA. The Tabesa cigarette company's website, states that he was one of the founders in 1994 of the cigarette company at Hernandarias, Alto Paraná along with Horacio Cartes, Jose Angel Avalos, Marcelino Zarate Riquelme, Pedro Knight and Cesar Cabral. The company is said to employ 1,150 as of 2013 and to have taken half the marketplace from Marlboro which previously dominated.

The Cuban cigar company Tabacos del Paraguay S.A. was established and in 1999 the trading company Habacorp SRL was added to support the cigar brand. Agricultural business Chajha SA and Livestock Las Pampas SA also joined the group in 1999.

In 2001 a distributor, Distribuidora del Paraguay SRL was added. It offers brands such as Pulp and Maxi sodas, juices Puro Sol and Watt's, Schneider beer, mineral water Fountain, the Full Power sports drink, energy drink and cane Battery Estrella de Oro. Agrotabacalera of Paraguay SA in Choré, a department of San Pedro, Paraguay, was added in 2002 to provide raw materials for cigarettes. In 2004 Consignataria SA (C.G.S.A.) was added. A citrus business became part of the conglomerate in 2006 with Agrocitrus of Paraguay SA. It is located in Moisés Bertoni in the Departamento de Caazapá.

Recent additions include the Sporting Life store (2009) selling sporting goods for tennis, paddle, squash and table tennis on Calle San Martin 2015 c / Molas López, Neighborhood Carmelites in Asunción and in 2009 Paraguay Multimodal Transport SA (Transporte Multimodal del Paraguay S.A.), a business logistics company. In 2010, La Misión S.A.'s three business units were added: the Paraguay Therapeutic Center with Dr. Maximum Ravenna treating obesity and other eating disorders; the restaurant Petit Bistro for service meats through Younique Goddard Catering; and Medical Spa for beauty treatment.

Cartes Group opened Bebidas USA to sell products under the name of "Planet Pulp" in the U.S.

In June 2012 Banco Amambay had around 2.8% of Paraguay's deposits (the 13th-largest by loan size), with its top 20 depositors accounting for 61% of its deposits.

Grupo Cartes had two joint ventures with Chilean Quiñenco; Bebidas del Paraguay through Compañía de las Cervecerías Unidas and Enex Paraguay through Enex. Following United States labelling of Horacio Cartes as "significantly corrupt", Quiñenco executives including Andrónico Luksic and Rodrigo Hinzpeter made a controversial visit in a private jet to the Cartes mansion to negotiate an end to the joint ventures.

== Philanthropy ==
On July 28, 2008, the Ramón T. Cartes foundation was opened, and it provided funding for the Arambe Education Center opened a year later to help serve children from poor families.

== Grupo Cartes businesses list ==
- Aerocentro
- Ganadera Sofia
- Banco Amambay
- Tabacalera del Este
- Tabacos del Paraguay
- Habacorp Cigar Trading
- Chajhá
- Ganadera Las Pampas
- Bebidas del Paraguay
- Distribuidora del Paraguay
- Paraguay Soccer
- Consignataria de Ganado
- Agrocitrus del Paraguay
- Tabacos USA
- Fundacion Rampon T Cartes (philanthropic)
- Sporting Life
- Transporte Multimodal del Paraguay
- La Mision
- Bebidas USA
- Fundacion Ñande Paraguay
- Multimedia Group
- Popular 103.1
- Montecarlo 100.9
- HEi 91.9, TV and Tropicalia
