= Sandra Quiñónez =

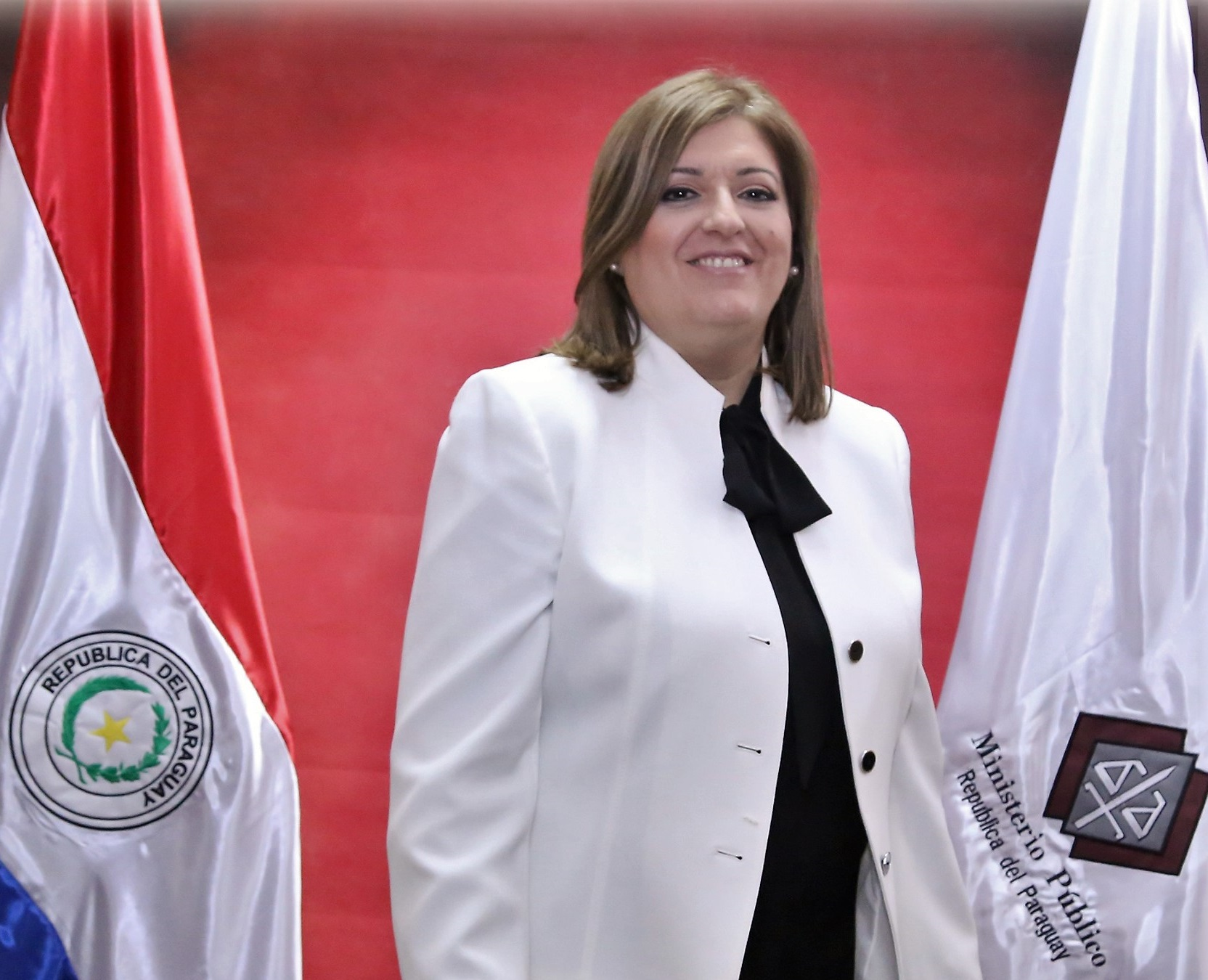

Attorney General of Paraguay
- Incumbent
- Assumed office 8 March 2018
- President: Mario Abdo Benítez
- Preceded by: Javier Díaz Verón

Personal details
- Born: 4 November 1968 (age 56); Asunción, Paraguay

Sandra Raquel Quiñónez Astigarraga (born 4 November 1968) is a Paraguayan jurist and politician who currently serves as Attorney General of Paraguay since 8 March 2018. She is the first woman to appointed to the post. Prior to her appointment, she served as a fiscal assistant and as a criminal prosecutor, serving the public function for twenty-four years.

== Early life and education ==
Born in Asunción, Quiñónez studied at the Colegio Inmaculado Corazón de María. She later studied at the Faculty of Law and Social Sciences of the Universidad Nacional de Asunción.

== Career ==
Quiñónez served as a prosecutor from 1994 to 2000 and as a criminal prosecutor from 2000 to 2018, serving in the public service for twenty-four years. In her efforts as a prosecutor, she gained prominence with her achievements, in which 100% of the oral trials that she has carried out have resulted in conviction.

As part of the anti-kidnapping prosecutor's office, the prosecutor gained prominence thanks to her intervention in high-profile cases. The first of these was that of María Edith Bordón de Debernardi, such as the case of the murder of journalist Pablo Medina and his assistant Antonia Almada, the kidnapping and murder of Cecilia Cubas, daughter of the former President of Paraguay, Raúl Cubas Grau and the kidnappings of Luis Lindstrom and Fidel Zavala among others. She was also in charge of the investigation of the case of Argentine Íbar Pérez Corradi, which ended in his arrest.
