= Marta Lafuente =

Paraguayan psychologist and politician (1968–2022)

Marta Justina Lafuente (16 March 1968 – 2 June 2022) was a Paraguayan psychologist and politician.

== Biography ==
Lafuente studied psychology at the Universidad Católica Nuestra Señora de la Asunción, an institution where she also worked as a lecturer and scholar.

On 15 August 2013 she was sworn in as Minister of Education and Culture of Paraguay in the cabinet of President Horacio Cartes. Following wide student mobilizations, she announced her resignation on 5 May 2016.

She died on 2 June 2022, at the age of 54.
