= Tabacalera del Este =

- Trade name: Tabesa
- Industry: Tobacco
- Founded: 1994 in Hernandárias, Alto Paraná, Paraguay
- Founder: Horacio Cartes; Jose Angel Avalos; Marcelino Zarate Riquelme; Pedro Knight; Cesar Cabral
- Headquarters: Hernandárias, Alto Paraná, Paraguay
- Area served: Paraguay, potentially other markets via smuggling
- Key people: Horacio Cartes
- Products: Cigarettes
- Brands: Palermo, TE, San Marino, Kentucky
- Owner: Previously Horacio Cartes (part of Grupo Cartes)
- Number of employees: 1,150
- Parent: Grupo Cartes (until 2023 reorganization)

Tabacalera del Este, also referred to as Tabesa, is Paraguay's largest cigarette manufacturer. It was bought by Horacio Cartes and was part of the president's business empire (Grupo Cartes) until it was reorganised in 2023.

== History ==
According to the company's website, Tabesa was established in 1994 at Hernandárias, Alto Paraná by Horacio Cartes, Jose Angel Avalos, Marcelino Zarate Riquelme, Pedro Knight and Cesar Cabral. Brands include Palermo, TE, San Marino and Kentucky. The company is said to employ 1,150 and to have taken half the marketplace from Marlboro which previously dominated.

The Palermo brand is sold in some part of the U.S.

== Cigarette smuggling ==
According to a 2009 report from the Center for Public Integrity, the company's products are widely sold in part of a vast cigarette smuggling operation into Brazil and Argentina. Roque Fabiano Silveira is the most famous person associated with the smuggling business.

== See also ==
- Tobacco industry
- List of multinational corporations
