= Sheila Abed =

Paraguayan lawyer and politician

Sheila Raquel Abed de Zavala is a Paraguayan lawyer and politician.

== Biography ==
Abed studied law at the National University of Asunción; afterwards she obtained a Master in Environmental Law at the Université de Limoges. She has experience in environmental topics in the framework of the United Nations.

On 15 August 2013 she was sworn in as Minister of Justice and Labor of Paraguay in the cabinet of President Horacio Cartes. In April 2020, alongside international affairs experts Claudia S. de Windt and Maria Amparo Alba, Abed founded the Inter-American Institute on Justice and Sustainability (IIJS) in the city of Washington, D.C., in United States of America where the organization has its headquarters.
