= Horacio Cartes =

President of Paraguay from 2013 to 2018

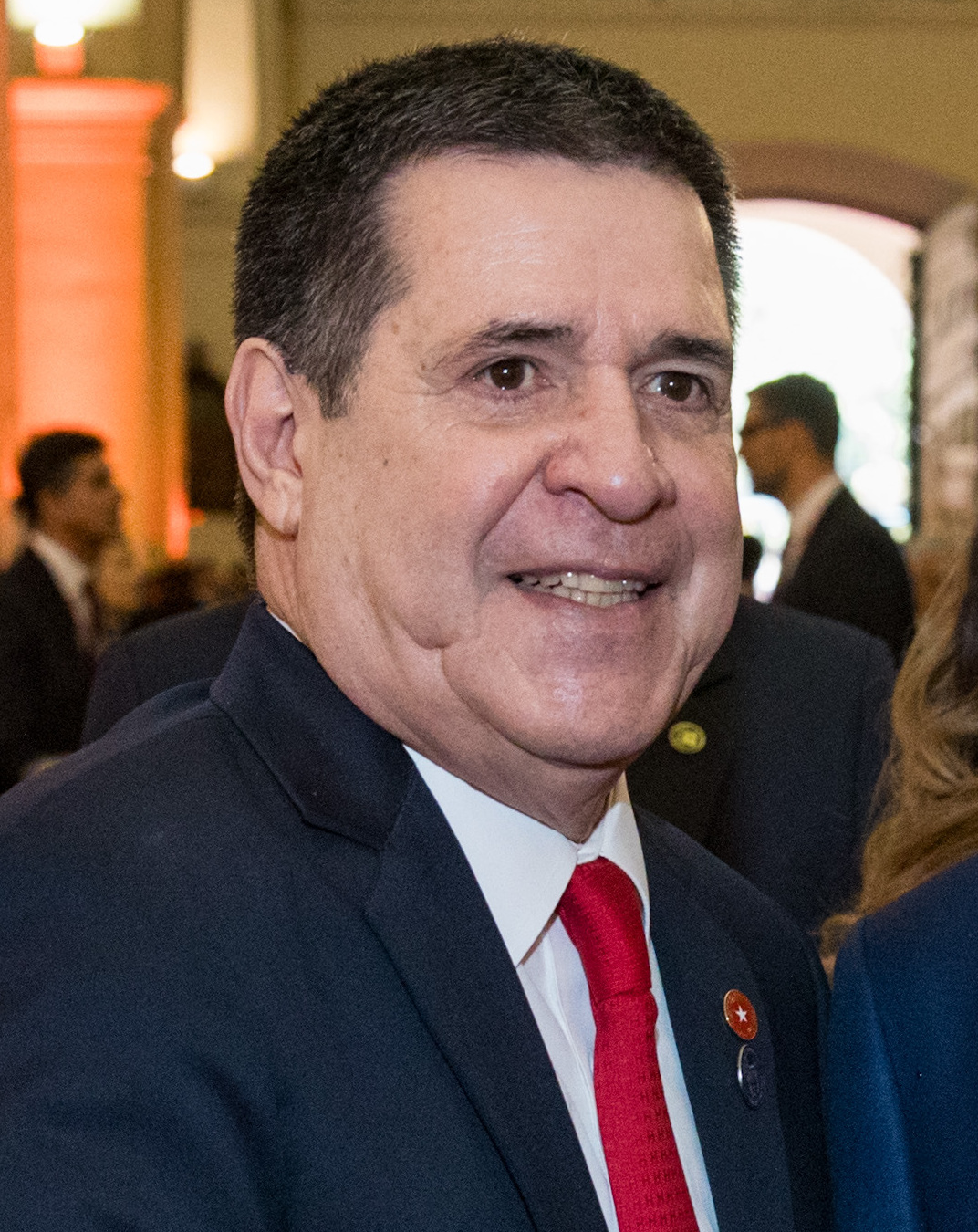
- Cartes in 2023

50th President of Paraguay
- In office 15 August 2013 – 15 August 2018
- Vice President: Juan Afara Maciel (2013–2018) (Note: Office vacant from 11 April 2018 to 9 May 2018.); Alicia Pucheta (May–Aug 2018)
- Preceded by: Federico Franco
- Succeeded by: Mario Abdo Benítez

President of the Colorado Party
- Incumbent
- Assumed office 10 January 2023
- Leader: Mario Abdo Benítez (Jan–Aug 2023); Santiago Peña (2023–2026); Pedro Alliana (2026-present)
- Preceded by: Pedro Alliana

Personal details
- Born: Horacio Manuel Cartes Jara; 5 July 1956 (age 70) Asunción, Paraguay
- Party: Colorado (since 2009)
- Spouse: María Montaña (m. 1985; div. 2005)
- Children: 3
- Relatives: Juan Antonio Jara (great-grandfather)
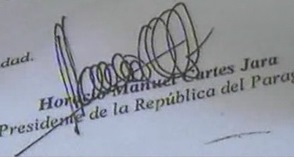
- Signature

Horacio Manuel Cartes Jara (Spanish pronunciation: [oˈɾasjo maˈnwel ˈkaɾtes ˈxaɾa]; born 5 July 1956) is a Paraguayan politician and businessman who is serving as president of the Colorado Party since 2023, having previously served as president of Paraguay from 2013 to 2018.

Cartes owned about two dozen businesses in his Grupo Cartes conglomerate until he left the conglomerate in 2023, including tobacco, soft drinks, meat production, and banking. He was president of Club Libertad football club from 2001 until 2012, and president of the national team inside the Paraguayan Football Association during the 2010 FIFA World Cup qualification. A 2021 affidavit made by Cartes showed that his net worth was $490 million (or ₲3.6 trillion), making him one of Paraguay's wealthiest people. Cartes's politics and influence led to the creation of a political movement known as Cartismo, of which he is the central figure, which has influenced the direction of the Colorado Party and Paraguayan politics at large.

Between 2022 and 2025, he was classified as "significantly corrupt" and as a result subsequently subjected to economic sanctions by the United States, which accuses him of involvement in transnational crime and terrorist organizations. Donald Trump suspended these sanctions after returning to power in 2025.

== Business career ==
Cartes' father was the owner of a Cessna aircraft franchise holding company and the young Horacio studied aviation mechanics in the United States. At the age of 19, he started a currency exchange business which grew into the Banco Amambay. Over the following years, Cartes bought or helped establish 25 companies including Tabesa, the country's biggest cigarette manufacturer, and a major fruit juice bottling company.

In 1986, Cartes spent 60 days in jail during a currency fraud investigation. He was accused of making millions of dollars by obtaining a central bank loan at a preferential exchange rate and then moving it through his money exchange business before buying farm equipment in the U.S. The case was eventually dropped.

In 1989, Cartes was again jailed on charges of currency fraud for seven months. He was eventually cleared by a court.

In 2000, the anti-drug police seized a plane carrying cocaine and marijuana on his ranch. He claimed that the plane had made an emergency landing, that he had no involvement with the drug trade and that he opposed the legalization of narcotics.

Cartes' name appears in the Offshore leaks files in connection with a Cook Islands financial entity linked to Cartes' Paraguayan bank Banco Amambay. A classified WikiLeaks cable from 2010 mentioned Cartes as the focus of a money laundering investigation by the DEA.

== Early political career ==
Until 2008, Cartes was uninvolved in politics and was not registered as a voter. He joined the conservative Colorado Party in 2009 and said he wanted to counter the swing to the left in Latin American politics. He became known as an efficient politician uncompromised by his party's past support of the military dictatorship of Alfredo Stroessner, who ruled until 1989.

In regards to allegation of his connections to the drug trade, as well as being targeted by the DEA, he said during his presidential campaign: "I wouldn't want to be president if I had ties to drug traffickers. Go to the courts and check. There's nothing, not a single charge against me."

== President of Paraguay ==
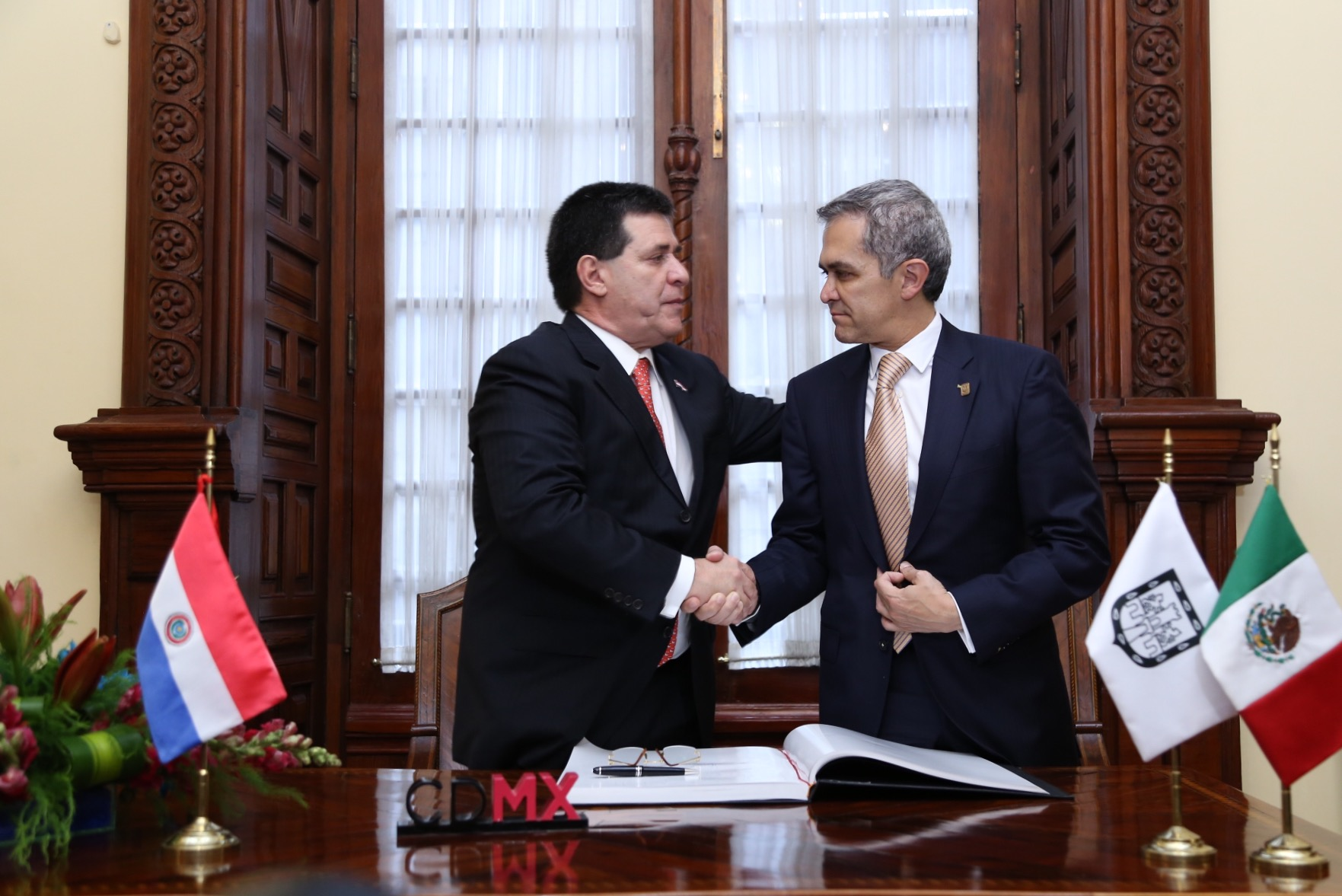
Ceremony of “Distinguished Guest” to Cartes in Mexico in August 2016

=== Election ===
Cartes was the Colorado candidate at the 2013 presidential election. The BBC suggested that his convincing points during his campaign were the promises to raise private capital to upgrade the country's infrastructure, to modernise its public enterprises, to attract international investments, and job creation. On 21 April 2013, he was elected President of Paraguay with 45.80% of the votes. When he took office on 15 August, it marked only the second time in the country's 202 years of independence that a ruling party peacefully transferred power to the opposition.

In regards to the impeachment of Lugo and the negative reception the country was given in the aftermath by Latin American leaders, Cartes defended the legality of the impeachment and said that Paraguay should not withdraw from Mercosur, pointing to the economic benefits of the common market and freedom of trade.

He was sworn in on August 15, 2013, and used his inaugural address to declare a war on poverty in Paraguay. His inauguration was attended by fellow conservative South American, Chilean President Sebastián Piñera, as well as Argentina's Cristina Fernández de Kirchner, Peru's Ollanta Humala, Brazil's Dilma Rousseff, Uruguay's José Mujica and Taiwan's Ma Ying-jeou.

=== Cabinet ===
Cartes announced his cabinet in August 2013 upon being sworn in. He selected mainly technocratic candidates for the positions.

Portfolio	Minister	Term	
Vice President	Juan Afara		
Minister of Finance	Germán Rojas	August 2013 – January 2015	
Minister of Finance	Santiago Peña	January 2015 – June 2017	
Minister of Finance	Lea Giménez	June 2017 – August 2018	
Minister of Foreign Relations	Eladio Loizaga		
Minister of National Defense	Gen. Bernardino Soto Estigarribia	August 2013 – November 2015	
Minister of National Defense	Diógenes Martínez	November 2015 –	
Minister of the Interior	Francisco de Vargas	August 2013 – November 2016	
Minister of the Interior	Tadeo Rojas	November 2016 – April 2017	
Minister of the Interior	Lorenzo Darío Lezcano	April 2017 –	mainly as a consequence of the violent repression of protesters by the police on 31 March 2017.
Minister of Industry and Commerce	Gustavo Leite		
Minister of Agriculture and Livestock	Jorge Gattini		
Minister of Public Works and Communications	Ramón Jiménez Gaona		a former Olympic athlete
Minister of Housing and Habitat	Soledad Núñez	October 2014 – 2018	
Minister of Health and Social Welfare	Dr. Antonio Barrios		Cartes' personal physician
Minister of Education and Science	Marta Lafuente	August 2013 – May 2016	Lafuente resigned in May 2016,
Minister of Education and Science	Enrique Riera Escudero	May 2016 –	
Minister of Justice	Sheila Abed	August 2013 – January 2016	
Minister of Justice	Carla Bacigalupo	January 2016 – July 2016	
Minister of Justice	Ever Martínez	July 2016 –	
Minister of Labor, Employment, and Social Security	Guillermo Sosa		
Minister of Women	Ana María Baiardi		
Sports Secretary	Víctor Pecci		

=== Education ===
In 2015, massive student protests occurred in Paraguay. The demand of students was a better quality of education, demanding an increase in the education budget to reach 7% of the national GDP as requested by UNESCO; at the time education spending represented 3.9% of GDP and was one of the lowest in the region.

=== Foreign relations ===
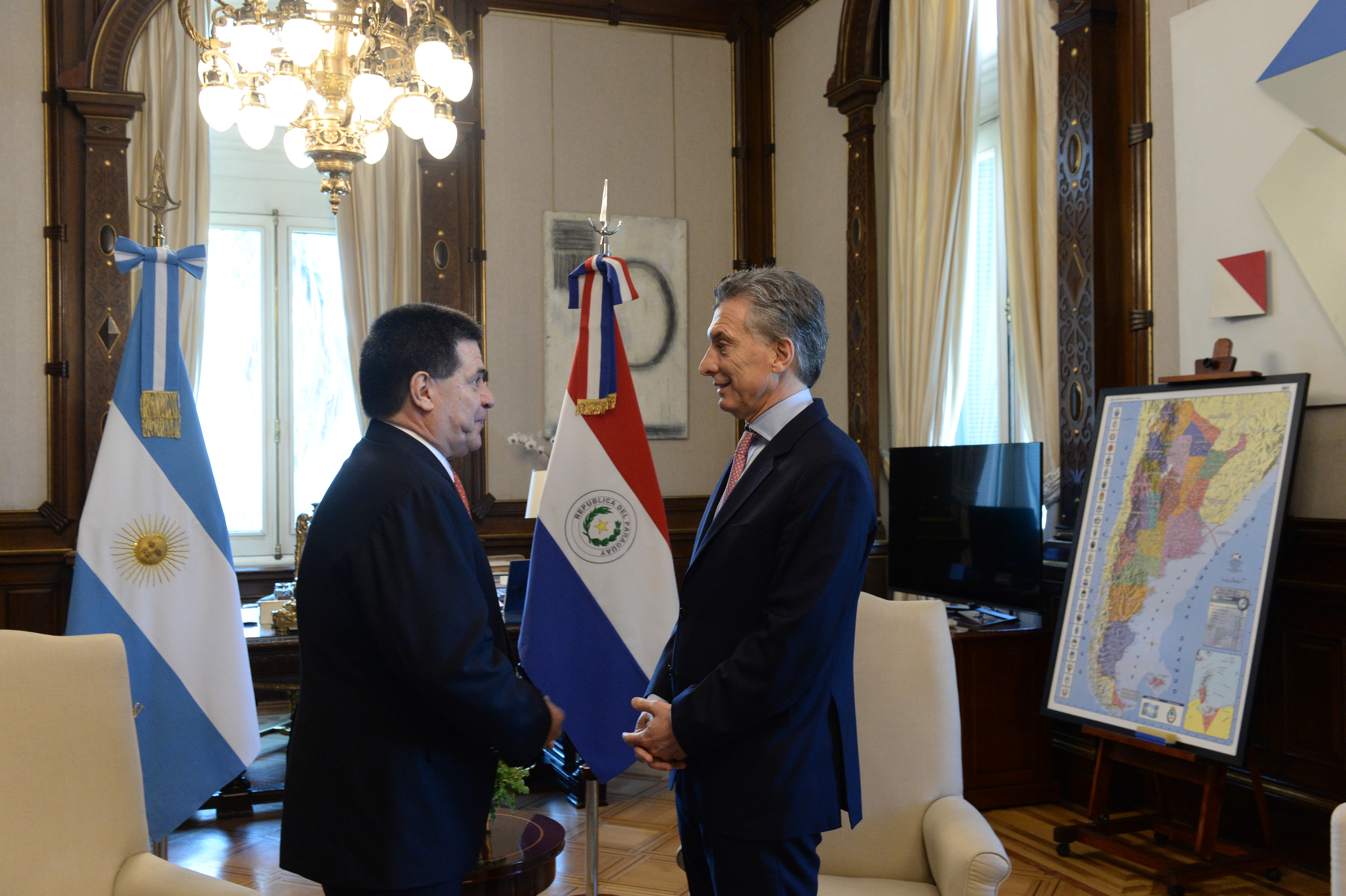
Cartes met with President of Argentina Mauricio Macri in Casa Rosada in September 2016.

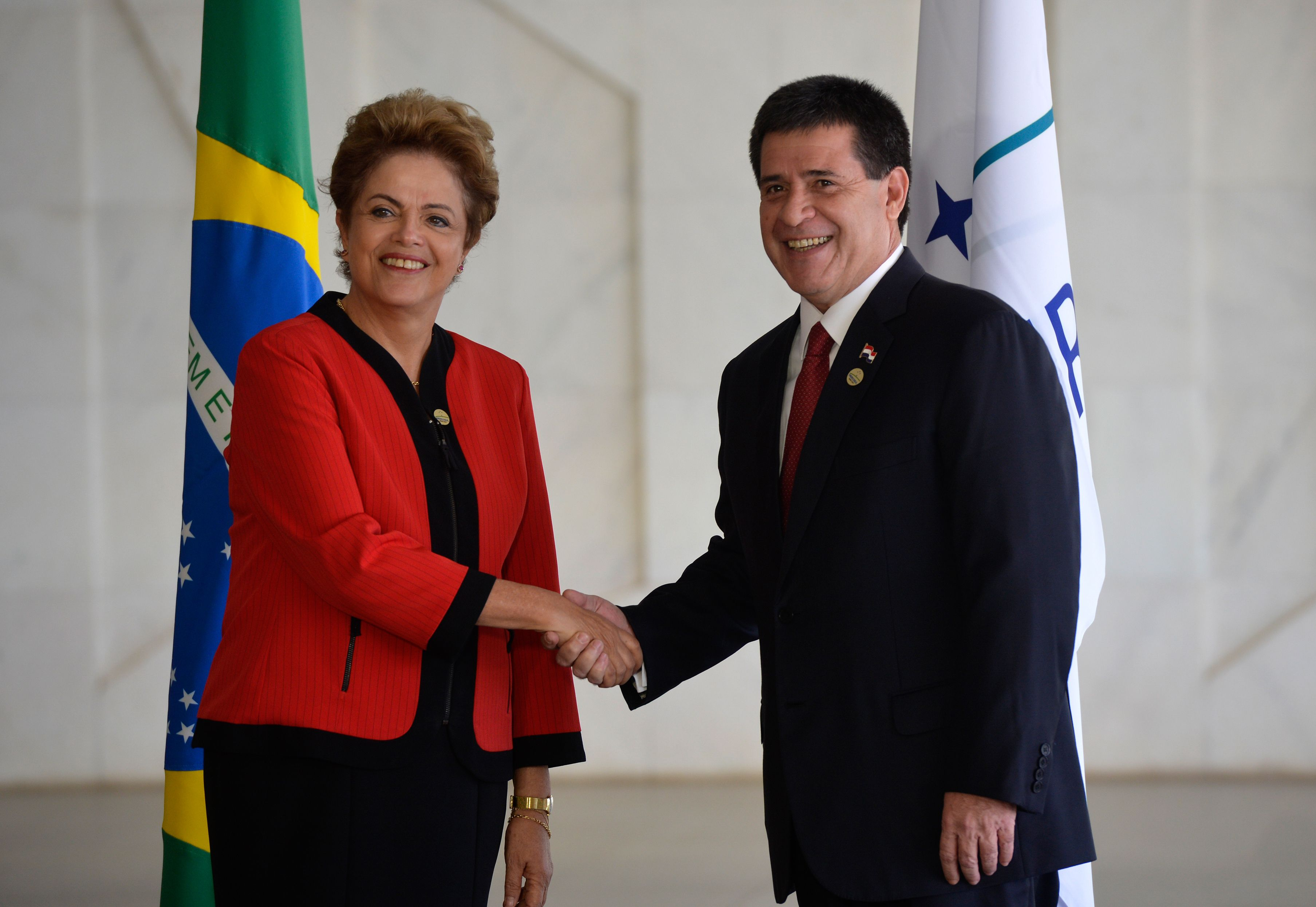
Cortes with President of Brazil Dilma Rousseff

On May 21, 2018, the Paraguayan embassy moved to Jerusalem, becoming the third country in the world to recognize the city as the diplomatic capital of Israel. However, Cartes's successor Mario Abdo Benítez reversed the decision on September 5, 2018.

=== Promotion of regulatory reforms ===
During his term, the executive branch promoted the creation of a Superintendency of Retirement and Pensions.

In September 2014, Cartes appointed Benigno López as head of the Social Security Institute (IPS), in April 2017, Guillermo Sosa as Minister of Labor, and in June 2017, Lea Giménez as Minister of Finance.

In July 2017, Guillermo Sosa stated that this position would ensure the safekeeping of the funds, protecting them from possible “cases of fraud, such as what happened with the funds of the Itaipu Pension Fund (Cajubi).”

In September 2017, Benigno López insisted that a regulator like the Superintendency was necessary to safeguard investments, citing, for example, the losses of the Itaipu Pension and Retirement Fund (Cajubi) that occurred when no such body existed.

Benigno López, in 2011, when he was Director of the Central Bank of Paraguay (BCP), had already indicated that the Cajubi financial scandal was similar to the emblematic case of the Paraguayan banks Union and Oriental that had erupted a decade earlier during the administration of President Luis Angel González Macchi.

In May 2018, the Minister of Finance, Lea Giménez; the Minister of Labor, Guillermo Sosa; the President of the Central Bank of Paraguay (BCP), Carlos Fernández Valdovinos; and the head of the Social Security Institute (IPS), Benigno López, held a press conference explaining the urgency and necessity of having a Superintendency of Pensions and Retirement.

In August 2018, Benigno López, accompanied by Lea Giménez, met with representatives of the Senate, stating that the Superintendency was necessary to prevent further scams like the Cajubi case.

=== Reelection attempt ===
The current constitution limits the president to a single five-year term. In late 2016 and early 2017, Cartes and his supporters in Congress attempted to pass a constitutional amendment to run for re-election, a move described by the opposition as "a coup". On 31 March 2017, a series of protests erupted after supporters of the amendment in the Senate voted for the amendment during a secret session in a closed office rather than on the Senate floor, during which demonstrators set fire to the Congress building. Several people were reported injured, including one protester who was killed after being hit by a shotgun blast by police, and one lower-house deputy who had to undergo surgery after being injured by rubber bullets. On 17 April, Cartes announced that he would not run for a second presidential term even if the amendment passed. On 26 April, the Chamber of Deputies rejected the proposed constitutional amendment for presidential re-election. In a June 2019 interview with the Financial Times, when asked about the amendment, Cartes said, "If you ask me today if it was a mistake, yes it was because it created an unnecessary climate."

=== Resignation attempt ===
In the 2018 Paraguayan general election, Cartes, while still President, ran for a full Senate seat, which was perceived as an attempt of extending his political influence past his presidency, and was elected. New Senators would be sworn in on 30 June 2018, six weeks before Cartes's presidential term was scheduled to end, thus the need for Cartes to leave office before the expiration of his term, as the constitution states officials can not hold two offices concurrently. Consequently, on 28 May 2018, Cartes offered his resignation as president, which would have to be agreed to by Congress. Legislators were opposed to Cartes resigning and taking up the seat, stating it was unconstitutional. The opposition, as well as dissidents within Cartes' own Colorado Party, successfully blocked Cartes's resignation, boycotting the vote, hence preventing a quorum from being present for a vote on the resignation. Cartes withdrew his bid to resign and be sworn in as a senator on 26 June 2018 after not receiving enough political support to carry through his plans.

== Designation as "significantly corrupt" by the U.S. ==
On 22 July 2022, Antony J. Blinken, Secretary of State of the United States, announced that —

The United States is designating former Paraguayan President Horacio Manuel Cartes Jara for his involvement in significant corruption. Former President Cartes obstructed a major international investigation into transnational crime in order to protect himself and his criminal associate from potential prosecution and political damage. These actions undermined the stability of Paraguay’s democratic institutions by contributing to public perception of corruption and impunity within the office of the Paraguayan President. Additionally, these actions enabled and perpetuated Cartes’s recently documented involvement with foreign terrorist organizations and other U.S.-designated entities which undermines the security of the United States against transnational crime and terrorism and threatens regional stability.

This public designation is made under Section 7031(c) of the Department of State, Foreign Operations, and Related Programs Appropriations Act, 2022. The Department is also designating Cartes’s adult children Juan Pablo Cartes Montaña, Sofía Cartes Montaña, and María Sol Cartes Montaña.

These designations reaffirm the commitment of the United States to combat corruption, which harms the public interest, hampers countries’ economic prosperity, and curtails the ability of governments to respond effectively to the needs of their people. The United States continues to stand with all Paraguayans in support of democracy and the rule of law and will continue to promote accountability for those who abuse public power for personal gain.

On 26 January 2023, the United States announced further sanctions against Cartes, prohibiting him to do business with U.S. companies or have access to U.S. banks under the Magnitsky Act sanctions program. Four Cartes companies operating in the United States are also blocked from accessing the country's financial system under the Specially Designated Nationals and Blocked Persons List (SDN List) managed by the Office of Foreign Assets Control (OFAC): Tabacos USA, Bebidas USA, Dominicana Acquisition and Frigorífico Chajha. On 31 March, it was announced that Tabacalera del Este S.A. (Tabesa), another Cartes company (of which Tabacos USA was its U.S. branch) was also added to the SDN List.

On 24 March 2023. Cartes announced that, as a result of the sanctions, he was leaving the Grupo Cartes conglomerate, citing that many jobs were in risk and hoped that his separation to the group wouldn't "risk" the well-being of the Grupo Cartes's workers's families. Grupo Cartes later announced that Cartes's sister Sarah was also leaving the conglomerate and that the brand itself would be discontinued.

In October 2025, the US State Department announced the lifting of sanctions on Cartes, saying that the sanctions were no longer in the interests of the United States. Cartes thanked President Trump, while current President Santiago Peña, an ally of Cartes, also extended his gratitude to the US government. It is still unclear if the travel ban was included in the decision.

== Controversial statements ==
Leading to the 2013 presidential election, Cartes made controversial statements on the LGBT community, comparing it to "monkeys". He also said he would "shoot myself in the bollocks" if he were to discover a son who wanted to marry another man.

On 10 August 2018, when asked by a journalist about his response to a series of citizen protests on Yacyretá Dam deals and congressmen with pending criminal cases, Cartes responded "rubber bullets". Cartes later apologized for the remark, stating, "I want to express my apologies to the young people for the published expressions. I always encouraged them to express themselves and my goal is the peace of all Paraguayans".

== Awards and honors ==
- Taiwan: Order of Brilliant Jade with Grand Cordon (October 2014)
- Chile: Collar of the Order of Merit (2016)
- Brazil: Grand Collar of the Order of the Southern Cross (17 February 2017)
- Portugal: Grand Collar of the Order of Prince Henry (10 May 2017)

== Notes ==
Party political offices
Preceded by Blanca Ovelar	Colorado Party nominee for President of Paraguay; 2013	Succeeded by Mario Abdo Benítez
Preceded by Pedro Alliana	President of the Colorado Party; 2023–present	Incumbent
Political offices
Preceded by Federico Franco	President of Paraguay; 2013–2018	Succeeded by Mario Abdo Benítez
