= Gustavo Leite =

Paraguayan businessman and politician

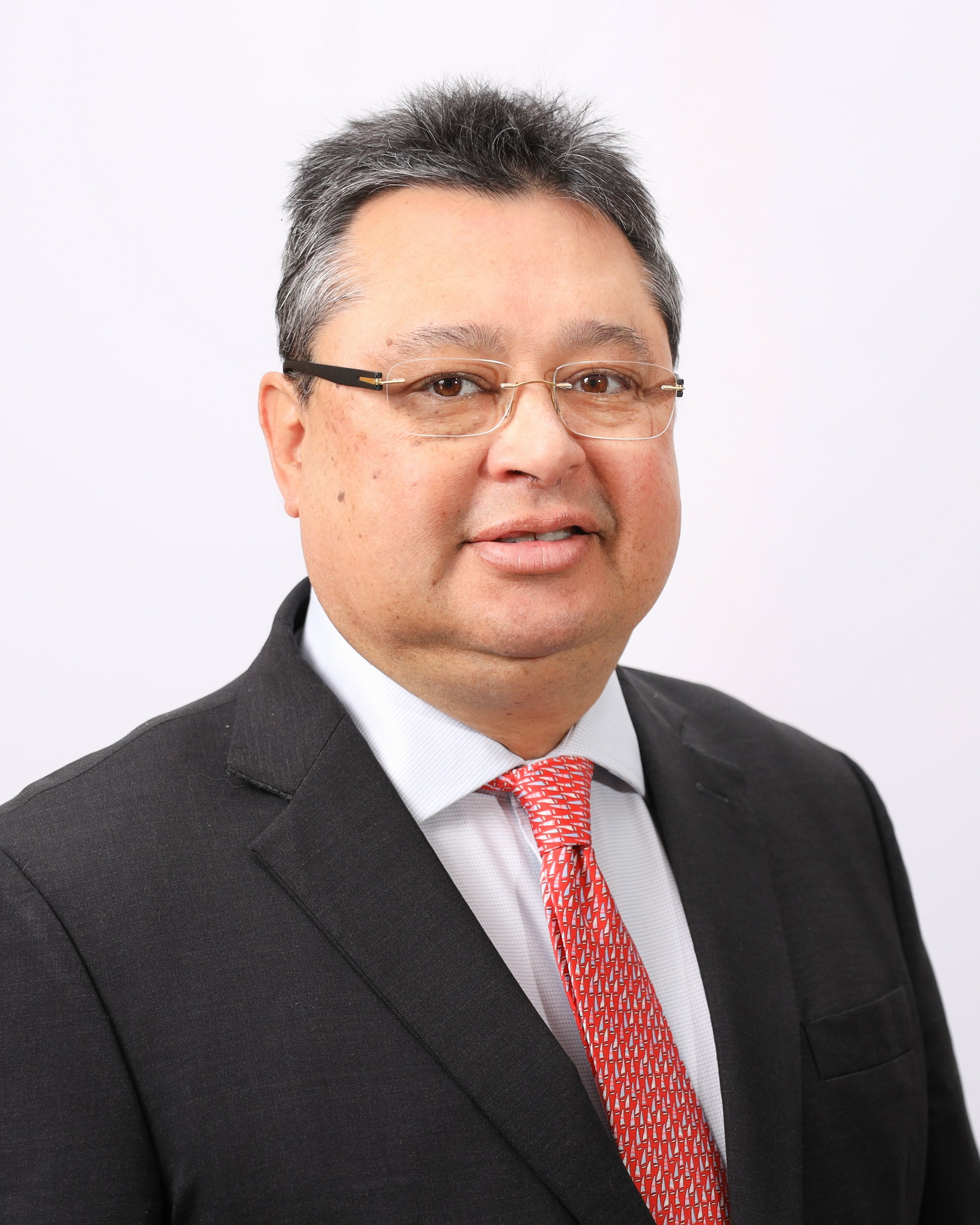
- Official portrait, 2023

Ambassador of Paraguay to the United States
- Incumbent
- Assumed office 24 July 2025
- President: Santiago Peña

Senator of Paraguay
- In office 30 June 2023 – 23 July 2025

Minister of Industry and Commerce
- In office 15 August 2013 – 15 August 2018
- President: Horacio Cartes
- Preceded by: Diego Zavala
- Succeeded by: Liz Cramer

Personal details
- Born: Gustavo Alfredo Leite Gusinky; February 28, 1962 (age 64)
- Party: Colorado Party
- Spouse: Paola Serrati
- Occupation: Businessman; politician

Gustavo Alfredo Leite Gusinky (born 28 February 1962) is a Paraguayan businessman and politician, currently serving as Paraguay's ambassador to the U.S. since 2023.

== Biography ==
Leite studied Business Administration at the University of California, Irvine (Major in Finance, Minor in Economics) and also at the Chapman University; he obtained a Master in International Marketing at the Scottish Marketing School, University of Strathclyde, in 1988.

Leite served as Planning Minister during the presidency of Raúl Cubas Grau (1998–1999).

On 15 August 2013 he was sworn in as Minister of Industry and Commerce of Paraguay in the cabinet of President Horacio Cartes. During his stint as Minister of Industry and Commerce he was accused of requesting a $500,000 bribe from a meat processing plant businessman.
