= Claudia S. de Windt =

Dominican environmental lawyer and political scientist

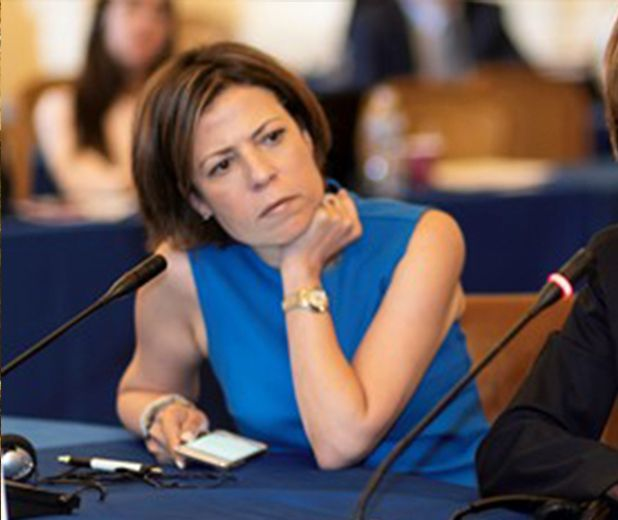

Executive Director of the Inter-American Institute of Justice and Sustainability
- Incumbent
- Assumed office June 2019

Head of the Environmental Law, Policy, and Good Governance Section of the Organization of American States
- In office 2008 – August 2018

Personal details
- Born: Santo Domingo, Dominican Republic
- Education: Universidad Iberoamericana; American University; Harvard Law School
- Occupation: Lawyer
- Website: www.ii-js.org/leadership/claudiadewindt/

Claudia Sofia de Windt Vicente is a Dominican international environmental lawyer and political scientist.

== Early life and education ==
Claudia S. de Windt was born in Santo Domingo, Dominican Republic. Her grandfather, Admiral César de Windt Lavandier, inspired her interest in nature. She studied law at the Universidad Iberoamericana (UNIBE), earned a master's degree in international legal studies from the Washington College of Law, and a certificate in negotiation from Harvard Law School.

She was granted her license to practice law in the Dominican Republic in June 2000.

== Career ==
In 2001, de Windt began working at the Department of Sustainable Development and the Secretariat for Multidimensional Security of the Organization of American States (OAS), directing initiatives for legislative reform, justice, sustainability, environmental law, and its relationship to human rights in the Americas. She has worked on proposals for business standards and practices to ensure sustainability without losing sight of mitigating climate change.

She made oral arguments regarding the request of the Republic of Colombia for an advisory opinion of the Inter-American Court of Human Rights on the interpretation of various articles of the American Convention on Human Rights, addressing its environmental implications and ramifications.

At OAS, she was head of the Environmental Law, Policy, and Good Governance section, and a principal specialist in environmental security and justice. As a senior adviser, she led various political processes and negotiations on sustainability at the multilateral and hemispheric level.

De Windt has co-authored several legislative proposals in the Americas, including the General Environmental Law of the Dominican Republic and its regulations. In 2015, she was part of the Environment Commission that worked on updating Mexico's environmental legal framework at the Federal Senate level. This work continued in other countries in the region, such as Brazil. She has been involved in policy processes and negotiations on sustainability, both in the Inter-American system and the United Nations.

During the COVID-19 pandemic, de Windt proposed solutions from environmental law to address pandemics in the Americas, collaborating with the World Commission on Environmental Law (WCEL), including the launch of its first webinar in Spanish.

In April 2020, together with former Paraguayan Justice Minister Sheila Abed and Ecuadorian environmental expert María Amparo Albán, de Windt founded the Inter-American Institute of Justice and Sustainability (IIJS), an organization based in Washington, D.C., with a presence in several cities in the Americas. She was appointed its executive director on World Environment Day, 5 June 2020.

De Windt is an adjunct professor at American University's Washington College of Law.

== Recognition ==
- In November 2015, de Windt was recognized by the OAS Permanent Council for her ongoing work and commitment to the issue of climate change.
- In June 2016, she was recognized by the OAS Permanent Council for her invaluable support and diligent efforts as an advisor to the Presidency during the negotiation process of the organization's 46th General Assembly.
- In January 2020, she was named a visiting scholar by the Environmental Law Institute
