= Ministry of Justice (Paraguay) =

The Ministry of Justice of Paraguay came into existence in January 2014 when the Ministry of Justice and Labor (which was established in August 1948) was divided into two separate entities. The ministry is responsible for administering the National Penitentiary System and the Civil Registry of Persons, and take the necessary steps to strengthen its role as an interlocutor between the Executive Branch and the Judicial Branch. The ministry aims to provide Paraguay with Legal security and safeguard human rights. The ministry aims to reform the justice system, coordinate with civil society organizations and public institutions, and improve and adapt justice services and shelter homes for the disadvantaged.

== List of ministers (1994-present)* ==
=== Minister of Justice and Labor ===
- Juan Manuel Morales (1994-1996)
- Sebastion Gonzalez Insfran (1996-1998)
- Angel Ramon Campos Vargas (1998-1999)
- Silvio Ferreira (1999-2002)
- Diego Abente Brun (2002)
- Jose Angel Burro (2002-2003)
- Juan Dario Monges (2003-2005)
- Derlis Cespedes (2005-2008)
- Blas Llano (2008-2009)
- Humberto Blasco (2009-2013)
- Sheila Abed (2013-2014)

=== Minister of Justice ===
- Sheila Raquel Abed de Zavala (2014-2016)
- Carla Bacigalupi (2016-2017)
- Ever Luís María Martínez Fernández (2017-present)

*The year range was chosen to reflect the twenty years of history that preceded the separation of the entities in 2014. As mentioned above, the Ministry of Justice and Labor originated in 1948.

== See also ==
- Justice ministry
- Politics of Paraguay
- Public Ministry of Paraguay
