= Cabinet of Paraguay =

The Cabinet of Paraguay is composed of twelve cabinet ministers. Each is appointed by the President of Paraguay, and serves as the head of a particular executive department.

== The Cabinet ==
=== 2024 Cabinet ===
As of 2024, the cabinet of Paraguay was mainly composed of members from the Colorado Party. They featured a range of portfolios aimed at addressing the nation's economic, social, and political landscape. While the precise list of twelve members might vary slightly based on how secretariats and key advisors are counted alongside core ministries, the government generally includes ministries responsible for areas such as the Interior, Economy and Finance, Foreign Relations, Public Health Justice, Public Works, and National Defense, among others. These officials are tasked with implementing the government's agenda, which includes commitments to fiscal stability, economic growth, and social protection programs, though challenges such as widespread corruption and the influence of organized crime persist in the political environment.

=== References ===
- "Paraguay: Freedom in the World 2024 Country Report." Freedom House, 2024. https://freedomhouse.org/country/paraguay/freedom-world/2024

Portfolio	Minister
President of the Republic	Santiago Peña
Chief of the Cabinet	Lea Giménez
Minister of the Interior	Enrique Riera Escudero
Minister of Economy and Finance	Carlos Gustavo Fernández Valdovinos
Minister of Foreign Relations	Rubén Ramírez Lezcano
Minister of Public Health and Social Welfare	María Teresa Barán
Minister of Women	Cynthia Figueredo
Minister of Justice	Ángel Ramón Barchini
Minister of Labor, Employment, and Social Security	Mónica Recalde
Minister of Public Works and Communications	Claudia Centurión
Minister of Agriculture and Livestock	Carlos Alcibiades Giménez Díaz
Minister of Industry and Commerce	Javier Giménez García de Zúñiga
Minister of National Defense	Óscar González
Minister of Education and Science	Luis Fernando Ramírez
Minister of Social Development	Miguel Tadeo Rojas
Minister of Environment and Sustainable Development	Rolando de Barros Barreto Acha
Minister of Urbanism, Housing, and Habitat	Juan Carlos Baruja
Minister of Information and Communication Technology	Gustavo Villate
Minister of Childhood and Adolescence	Walter Gutiérrez
Minister of the National Secretariat of Sports	César Ramírez Caje
Minister of the National Secretariat of Tourism	Angie Duarte de Melillo
Minister of the National Secretariat of Culture	Adriana Ortiz Semidei
Minister of the National Secretariat for Human Rights and Persons with Disabilities	Yody Marlene Ledesma
Minister of the National Secretariat of Youth	Florencia Taboada Evreinoff
Minister of the National Anti-Drug Secretariat	Jalil Rachid
Minister of the National Secretariat of Intelligence	Marco Alcaraz

== Past Cabinets ==
=== 2013 Cabinet ===
Portfolio	Minister
President of the Republic	Mario Abdo Benítez
Minister of Foreign Affairs	Eladio Loizaga
Minister of Finance	Santiago Peña
Minister of National Defence	Diógenes Martínez
Interior Minister	Tadeo Rojas
Minister of Industry and Commerce	Gustavo Leite
Minister of Agriculture	Juan Carlos Baruja
Minister of Public Works and Communications	Ramón Jiménez Gaona
Minister of Public Health and Social Welfare	Julio Daniel Mazzoleni
Minister of Education and Culture	Enrique Riera Escudero
Minister of Justice and Labor	Carla Bacigalupo
Minister for Women	Ana María Baiardi
Minister of Labor	Guillermo Sosa
