= 2026 Paraguay banking crisis =

Economic and political crisis

- President Santiago Peña (pictured in 2023), who was impeached and removed from power as a result of the crisis
- Date: 3 November 2026 – present (2 weeks)
- Location: Paraguay (with minor effects in Argentina)
- Caused by: Insolvency of Ueno Bank caused by illicit related-party lending, regulatory forbearance, and resolution order
- Status: Ongoing
- Result: Peña removed from office, stripped of lifetime senatorial immunity, and arrested; Resignation and criminal indictment of Carlos Carvallo as president of the Central Bank of Paraguay; Arrest orders issued for 27 corporate officers and executives of Grupo Vázquez and Ueno Bank; Asset freeze across around 3 million retail accounts

The 2026 Paraguay banking crisis is an ongoing financial and political crisis in Paraguay, triggered by the regulatory intervention and shutdown of Ueno Bank, the country's largest digital financial institution. The lender's collapse froze the liquid balances of approximately three million retail depositors, and endangered more than US$800 million in public and pension funds.

The crisis caused protests, strikes, and political unrest. On 6 November 2026, the Senate removed President Santiago Peña from office and revoked his constitutional immunity, while Vice President Pedro Alliana assumed the presidency. Peña was subsequently arrested alongside Central Bank President Carlos Carvallo on corruption and financial misconduct charges.

== Background ==
Ueno (stylised in lowercase) were founded as El Comercio (English: The Commerce), a financial advisory firm, in 1976. In 2021, Grupo Vázquez SAE bought a controlling stake in the company, and El Comercio was renamed Financiera Ueno, with Carlos Cavallo Spalding appointed president of the company. Over the following two years, the company gravitated towards a fintech model. In late 2023, the Central Bank of Paraguay (BCP) granted the entity a full commercial banking license. The bank rapidly scaled through digital-first onboarding, widespread incentives, low-barrier accounts, and high-profile sponsorships, including the Paraguay national football team.

In 2024, the BCP approved Ueno's acquisition of Visión Banco, a mid-sized traditional lender with distressed assets. Following this transaction, Ueno grew to become the sixth-largest bank in Paraguay by total assets; as of 30 September, Ueno had around 3 million clients, equivalent to about 63% of Paraguay's adult population, and had an 8% share of systematic bank loans. S&P Global Ratings rated it a long-term credit rating of BB, with a stable outlook. As late as 30 September 2026, the bank reported a regulatory solvency ratio of 13.8%, and on 30 October it announced a US$100 million capitalization plan.

Substantial state exposure amplified the bank's domestic importance. By August 2026, government agencies and pension entities deposited around 4.8 trillion guaraní (around US$850 million) of state money into Ueno. This made Ueno the second-largest holder of state funds, behind the state-owned Banco Nacional de Fomento (BNF). The holdings included roughly US$380 million belonging to public pension entities.

The expansion took place amid serious conflicts of interest. In March 2019, Santiago Peña acquired preferred Class K shares in Credicentro S.A.E.C.A. (which rebranded and merged into Ueno Holding S.A.E.C.A. under Grupo Vázquez). By March 2025 their value grew to 6.144 billion guaraníes, around US$1 million. He maintained his holdings after assuming the presidency, holding around a 1.58% equity stake in Ueno Holding S.A.E.C.A. Facing public scrutiny, Peña announced the sale and divestment on 4 April 2025. In addition, Carlos Carvallo Spalding served as president of Ueno until 2023, when Peña appointed him head of the Central Bank of Paraguay. Under Carvallo's tenure, oversight of Ueno was repeatedly challenged by opposition lawmakers, though official investigations were routinely dismissed by the executive branch.

== Collapse of Ueno ==
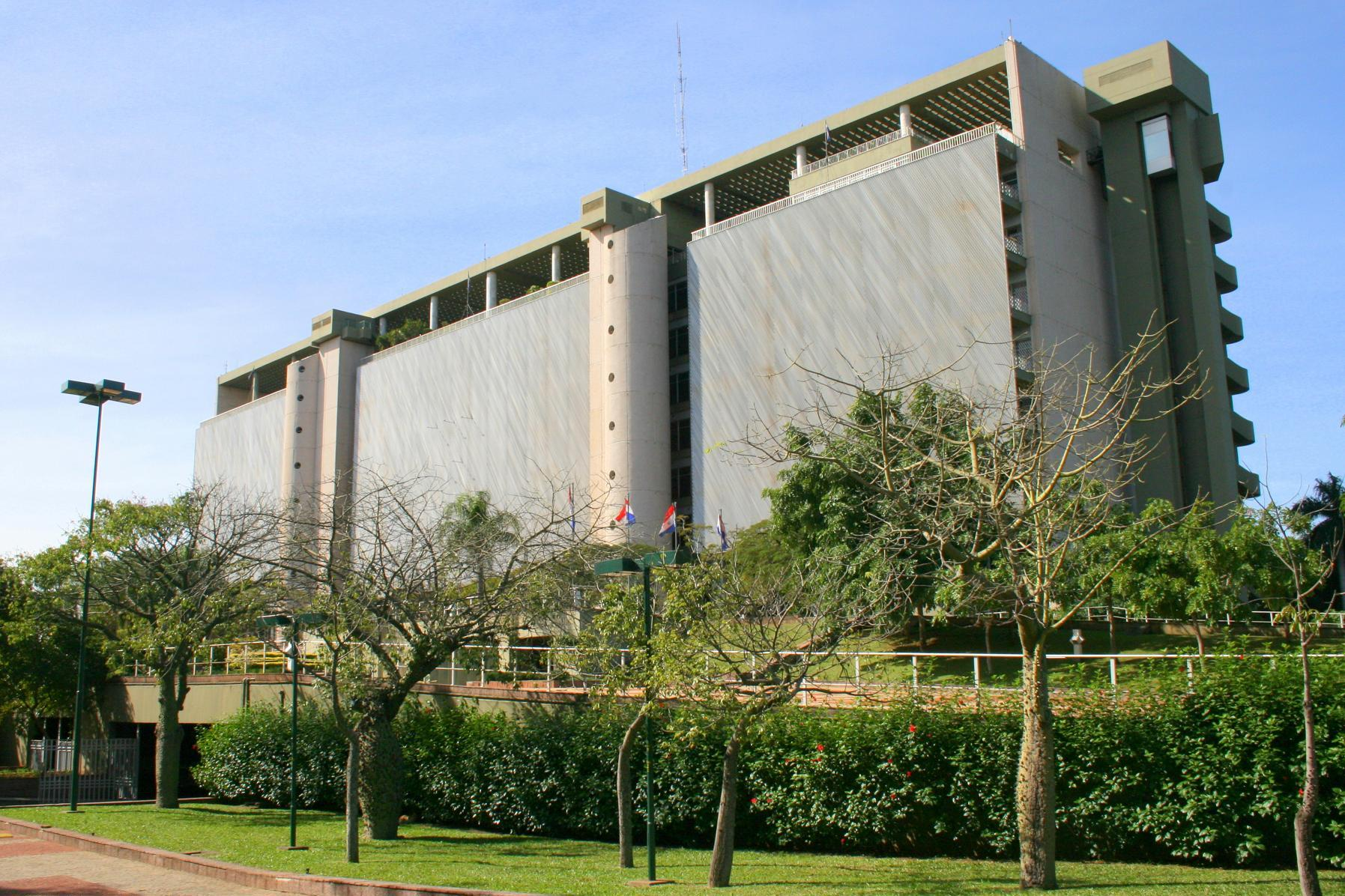
The Central Bank of Paraguay (pictured in 2010)

Suggestions of mismanagement first arose in July 2026, when Paraguayan media conglomerate Grupo ABC reported that Ueno were claiming solvency figures of PYG4.2 billion (roughly US$700,000) despite only registering PYG2.2 billion in assets at the end of 2025. Around the same time, ABC also reported that Ueno had been exceeding the legal deposit limits of pension funds since February 2025. In August, Ueno released a statement threatening legal action against Grupo ABC for what it claimed were "inaccurate statements".

Regulators within the Central Bank of Paraguay (BCP) had detected irregularities in Ueno's financial statements in the months leading up to November 2026, and inspectors uncovered that – between 2025 and 2026 – Ueno had extended between US$140–150 million in high-risk loans to companies linked to its controlling shareholder, Grupo Vázquez. A private 31-page report from the BCP was presented to the nations' Senate in October 2026 by Senate president Basilio Núñez concerning irregularities at four banks, including Ueno, leading to politicians from both the sitting Colorado Party and opposition groups demanding that the BCP open an investigation into Ueno. Peña criticised the presentation of the document, citing concerns over potential economic instability, whilst Ueno questioned the authenticity and origin of the document in a public statement.

On October 30th, Carmen Marín resigned from the BCP's board of directors over a leaked memorandum related to transactional irregularities from July 2026, paving the way for the BCP to open an administrative review into Ueno's operational practices two days later. When auditing adjusted for non-performing related-party assets, Ueno's actual solvency ratio was determined to be 5.56%, less than half the legal minimum of 12%. Due to these discoveries, at 03:24 PYST (UTC−03:00) on 3 November 2026, the BCP announced on X (formerly Twitter) that they voted unanimously to revoke Ueno's operation authority and put Ueno into resolution. The shutdown took effect overnight, and Ueno's mobile application and payment gateways went offline, locking depositors out of their primary liquid funds. The freeze also resulted in 7,000 employees across the wider Grupo Vázquez conglomerate losing their jobs overnight.

Paraguay's National Deposit Guarantee provides deposit insurance for balances up to 75 times the minimum monthly wage per depositor (around 121 million guaraníes, or between US$16,000 and $19,800). While the BCP noted that 97% of individual accounts are fully covered by deposit insurance, credit agency Moody's estimated that only around 30% to 35% of the total aggregate volume of Ueno's deposits were insured. The remaining uninsured capital included around US$800 million in public balances, including US$380 million of pension reserves covering over 32,000 retirees.

On 3 November, hundreds of account holders clustered outside of closed bank branches in cities such as Asunción, Ciudad del Este, and Encarnación. Over the following days, thousands of people protested at locations such as Peña's Asunción private residence and the National Congress and Plaza de Armas in Asunción. Protestors burned an image depicting Peña and erected burning barricades. Carvallo resigned from his position at the BCP shortly after at Peña's request, whilst the national judiciary sought the arrest of eight Ueno executives including Francisco Miguel Vázquez, the chairman of Grupo Vázquez SAE. Ricardo Estigarribia from the rival Authentic Radical Liberal Party called for the impeachment of Peña and his vice president Pedro Alliana.

On 5 November, the BCP announced emergency measures. Depositors with existing secondary bank accounts had their Ueno balances migrated to their secondary account, and customers who only had Ueno accounts had new accounts provisionally established through assigned commercial banks such as the BNF and Banco Familiar. On 7 November, the BCP said that 1.2 million customers had begun receiving partial or full reimbursements, or had their funds rerouted to stable partner banks.

On 7 November, major public education unions, representing over 40,000 educators, called an indefinite national strike. The unions demanded the guaranteed restitution of funds to the civil servants' pension fund and the Social Security Institute, as well as increased education funding in the 2027 national budget. The same day, Paraguay's Ministry of Social Development announced the emergency suspension of the state-run Zero Hunger feeding program across multiple cities.

About a week after the collapse, the BCP confirmed that it had disbursed nearly PYG4 billion through deposit insurance to over 1.5 million accounts, with the BCP's new president Jorge Schreiner suggesting that US$600 million in healthy assets could be transferred to other banks. At the same time, concerns began to emerge about what would happen to biometric data held by Ueno, including fingerprints and face scans of both customers and patrons of Ueno-sponsored events and venues, with Schreiner stating that Grupo Vázquez were primarily "database administrators".

== Impeachment of Santiago Peña ==
The financial collapse caused a severe political backlash. Facing political unrest, Central Bank President Carlos Carvallo resigned on 3 November 2026.

On 5 November, Peña announced his intent to resign, stating that he did so with the "stability of our country, social peace, and the need to preserve our public institutions", and the peace of mind of the Paraguayans as his priorities. However, his resignation was rejected by legislators, and the Chamber of Deputies later voted unanimously to instead approve impeachment proceedings against Peña. Citing a pattern of conflicts of interest and cover-ups tied to his past ownership of Ueno, and misuse of pension funds, lawmakers argued that permitting a voluntary resignation would allow Peña to automatically assume the constitutional seat of senator for life (senador vitalicio), allowing for lifetime immunity against criminal indictment.

The Chamber of Deputies voted 78–0 in an emergency session to reject the resignation and approve articles of impeachment. The trial moved immediately to the Senate. After rejecting Peña's request for a 72-hour recess by 39–3, the Senate voted 44–0 on 6 November to remove Peña from office on charges of breach of trust and administration for personal gain, stripping him of the constitutional lifetime senator status. However, the Chamber rejected impeaching Vice President Pedro Alliana in a 48–30 vote.

Alliana was sworn in as president the same evening. Peña became the second president in modern Paraguayan history to be removed from office via impeachment, following the 2012 impeachment of Fernando Lugo. Congress appointed Antonio Barrios, a senator from the Colorado Party, as the new vice president shortly after Alliana's ascension to the presidency.

Within hours of Peña's removal, the Attorney General's Office proceeded with criminal warrants. On the night of 6 November 2026, prosecutors ordered his arrest. Later that evening, armed police units arrived at Peña's private residence in Asunción, placing him under house arrest. Peña surrendered peacefully while crowds celebrated outside.

On 7 November, lead prosecutor Nancy Salomón charged Peña and Carvallo with breach of trust and administration of personal gain, citing the channeling of public capital into Ueno. Carvallo was also detained and faced additional counts of falsifying public regulatory instruments.

Judge Humberto Otazú ordered Peña to be placed under detention at a military facility. Formal charges were also announced for 27 executives and business figures, including arrest warrants for Miguel Vázquez, CEO of Ueno Bank, and Ueno Bank President Juan Manuel Gustale, along with freezes on multiple corporate and personal equity accounts.

On 8 November, public prosecutors conducted raids on Peña's luxury estate in San Bernardino, uncovering a hidden wall inside the property. In addition, police raided the private residence of Carvallo. A cell phone that Peña had access to while in detention was also found and seized. Authorities seized multiple luxury vehicles, private airplanes, and a yacht. Peña's San Bernardino house was reported to cost around 7.7 billion guaraníes (US $1.3 million) to build, and prosecution alleged Peña financed the construction using loans from Ueno Bank. The monthly loan payments exceeded his official presidential salary by around sixfold.

On 9 November, President Alliana nominated Jorge Schreiner to lead the central bank, awaiting congressional approval.

Paraguayan sovereign bond spreads increased by 30 basis points, with the guaraní depreciating over 8% against the US dollar since Ueno's intervention.
