= Ueno Bank =

Paraguayan bank

Ueno Bank S.A.
- Type: Sociedad anónima (S.A.)
- Founded: 1976 (Commercial finance); 1981 (CrediCentro); 2021 (as ueno holding SAECA); 2023 (as bank)
- Defunct: 3 November 2026; 18 days ago
- Fate: Failed; held in receivership by the Central Bank of Paraguay
- Headquarters: Asunción, Paraguay
- Website: ueno.com.py

Ueno Bank ([ˈweno]), legally Ueno Bank S.A., was a Paraguayan bank headquartered in Asunción. It operated primarily through digital payment platforms and originated from the consolidation of financial institutions with roots dating back to 1976. In November 2023, it obtained a banking license from the Central Bank of Paraguay, and in 2024 it absorbed Visión Banco, significantly expanding its customer base. By June 2026, it reported approximately 2.94 million customers, over 60% of Paraguay's adult population. The institution also maintained sponsorship agreements with major Paraguayan sporting organizations, including the Paraguayan Football Association, as well as cultural and social initiatives.

On 3 November 2026, the Central Bank of Paraguay initiated resolution proceedings for Ueno Bank after determining that its solvency ratio had fallen below half of the required minimum. Sparking a nationwide banking crisis, the measure restricted customers' access to their deposited funds and was followed by the resignation and arrest of Central Bank president Carlos Carvallo. Also, Ueno bank executives were arrested. Three days later, Paraguayan president Santiago Peña (who was a former shareholder of the bank) was removed from office and arrested.

== History ==
=== Financiera El Comercio, CrediCentro, and ueno holding SAECA (1976–2022) ===
Financiera El Comercio was founded in 1976.

CrediCentro was founded in 1981 at Mercado 4 by Víctor Hugo Vázquez. On 6 September 2021, in a transaction approved by the Board of Directors of the Central Bank of Paraguay, Grupo Vázquez acquired a 65% stake in Financiera El Comercio. On July 23, 2021, it merged the entity with CrediCentro. Subsequently, on December 20, 2021, El Comercio was renamed ueno holding SAECA.

In 2021, Carlos Carvallo Spalding assumed the role of president of the entity, a position he held until 2023.

=== Ueno Bank (2023–2026) ===
In November 2023, after meeting the requirements of the Central Bank of Paraguay, the entity obtained a license to operate as a bank and adopted the name Ueno Bank S.A.

In 2024, it acquired Visión Banco, which was integrated into its operational structure. Following this transaction, the institution expanded its customer base and surpassed one million active credit cards.

On 14 August 2025, the institution was the victim of a data leak involving approximately 250,000 customers, with the information published on a dark web forum. The bank's president, Juan Manuel Gustale, denied the veracity of the information and pointed to inconsistencies in the published data. The case was subsequently investigated by the Central Bank of Paraguay.

In December 2025, the entity announced the addition of OTP Bank as a shareholder following an investment of 30 million US dollars.

In March 2026, it issued bonds totaling $350 million on the New York Stock Exchange.

== Collapse (2026) ==
After absorbing Vision Bank, Ueno Bank S.A. became the bank with the largest client portfolio in the country. As of June 2026, it reported 2.94 million customers, equivalent to about 63% of the adult population, and was one of the four systemic banks in the country. It operated primarily through digital payment platforms.

The bank also managed public funds. At the end of August 2026, it held approximately 4.8 trillion guaraní (850 million dollars) of state money, behind only the National Development Bank. The bank was linked to Ueno Holding, of which Santiago Peña was a shareholder until 2025.

In the previous months, the bank was under scrutiny. Bloomberg reported that its bonds due in 2031 were trading below 90 cents amid regulatory surveillance and was preparing measures to bolster its capital. The state and IPS funds in the bank exceeded their effective wealth.

On 3 November 2026, the Central Bank of Paraguay initiated resolution proceedings for Ueno Bank, after determining that its solvency ratio had fallen below fifty percent (50%) of the required minimum—a result of adjustments made to its financial statements during the regularization process. Consequently, customers of the institution lost access to their deposited funds until further notice, in accordance with Law No. 2334/03. The president of the Central Bank of Paraguay, Carlos Carvallo, submitted his resignation, while the Public Prosecutor's Office ordered the arrest of the executives of the intervened bank. On 6 November, Paraguayan President Santiago Peña was impeached, removed from office, and arrested.

== Sponsorship ==
Prior to its collapse, Ueno Bank maintained sponsorship agreements with companies, clubs, federations, and sporting, cultural, and social events in Paraguay.

=== Football ===
Ueno Bank served as the primary sponsor of the Paraguayan Football Association (APF), with its brand featured in the names of competitions and the Estadio Defensores del Chaco. It also signed agreements with local clubs such as Club Olimpia, Cerro Porteño, Club Guaraní, and Sportivo Luqueño, which included stadium naming rights and the implementation of digital payment systems at events.

=== Other sports ===
The bank served as a strategic partner to the Paraguayan Olympic Committee (COP) and as a sponsor of the Paraguayan delegation in international competitions. It also maintained agreements with the National Sports Secretariat (SND) and was presented as the main sponsor of the 2025 Junior Pan American Games, held in Asunción. Furthermore, it sponsored the "Corrida Solidaria" (Solidarity Run) organized by the Dequení Foundation.

=== Auto racing ===
It was the main sponsor of the Rally del Paraguay—a round of the World Rally Championship (WRC)—for its 2025 and 2026 editions. The 2025 edition received recognition from the Fédération Internationale de l'Automobile (FIA). Following the bank's collapse, the rally organizers announced that they would seek a new sponsor. Additionally, it provided direct financial sponsorship to professional Paraguayan racing drivers, including Joshua Dürksen and Diego Domínguez Jr.

=== Culture and social actions ===
It maintained partnerships with Aldeas Infantiles SOS Paraguay and the SUMMA Network, focused on children's education and labor inclusion. In the entertainment sector, it entered into a partnership with the production company G5pro.

== Politics ==
In 2025, Ueno Bank financed the first Conservative Political Action Conference (CPAC) in Paraguay.
