= Politics of Paraguay =

Politics of Paraguay takes place in a framework of a presidential representative democratic republic. The National Constitution mandates a separation of powers in three branches. Executive power is exercised solely by the President. Legislative power is vested in the two chambers of the National Congress. The Judiciary power is vested on Tribunals and Courts of Civil Law and a nine-member Supreme Court of Justice, all of them independent of the executive and the legislature.

Historically, Paraguay has been characterized by civil wars, coups and authoritarianism. Paraguay was for several decades under dictatorial rule by Alfredo Stroessner and his Colorado Party until he was ousted from power in 1989, which set off a democratization process.

Since 1989, there has been an expansion of civil and political liberties, as well as elections at presidential, congressional, and municipal levels. However, the democratization process has been limited due to the firm control of the Colorado Party on the Paraguay state. The Colorado Party retains power through clientelistic practices. Corruption is widespread in Paraguay. The Economist Intelligence Unit rated Paraguay a "flawed democracy" in 2023. After having been rated a "flawed democracy" for 1 year, the Economist Intelligence Unit (EIU) returned Paraguay's rating to "hybrid regime" in 2024.

== Executive branch ==
Main office-holders
Office	Name	Party	Since
President	Pedro Alliana	Colorado Party	5 November 2026

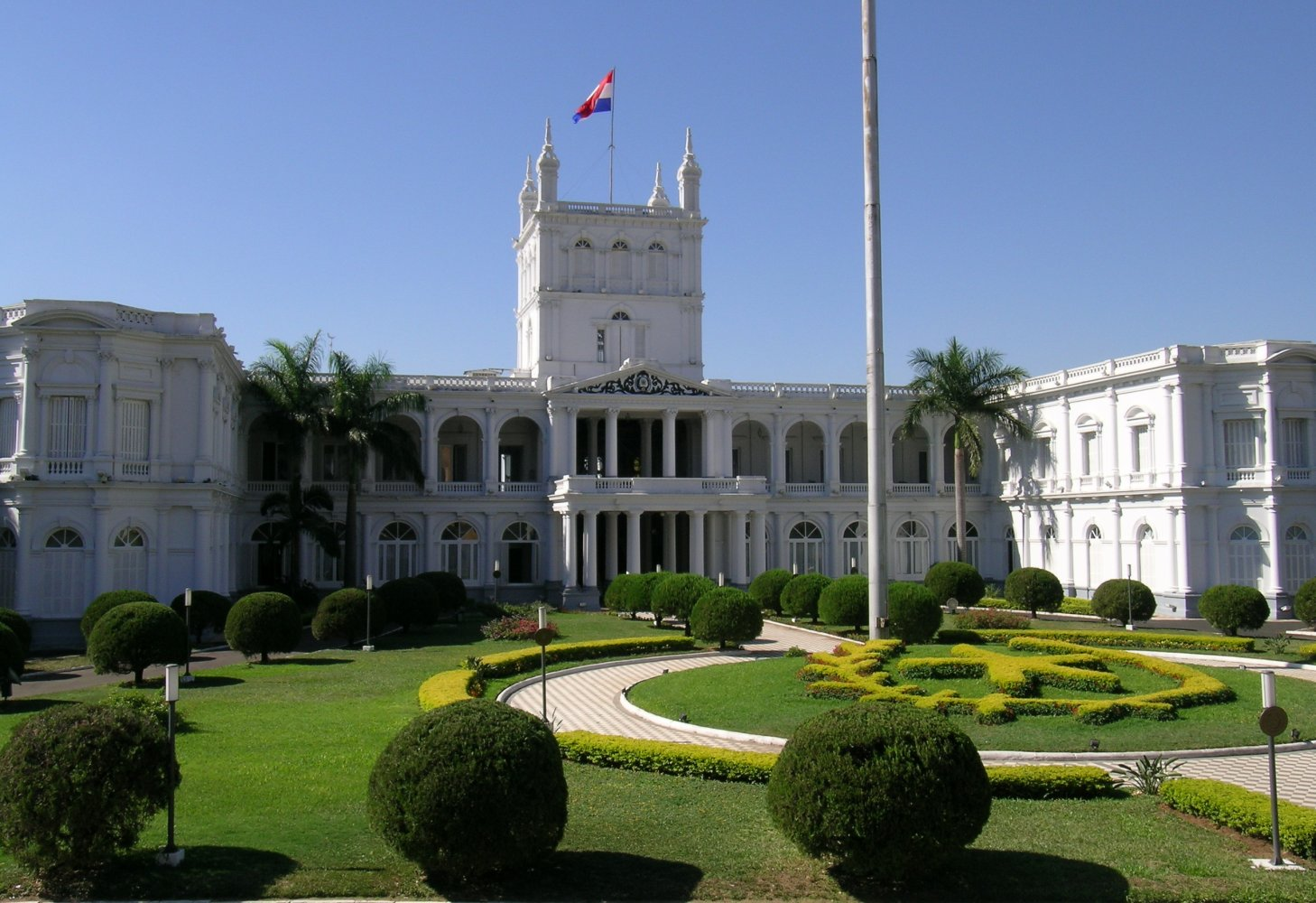
Palacio de los López

The president, popularly elected for one 5-year term with no chance of re-elections, appoints a cabinet. The president nominates the Council of Ministers. The presidential elections of 2008 were won by Fernando Lugo, a Roman Catholic bishop whose ministerial duties have been suspended on his request by the Holy See. It was the first time in 61 years that the Colorado Party lost a presidential election in Paraguay, and only a second time that a leftist served as president after 1936–37, and the first time one was ever freely elected. In 2013, Lugo was removed from office through the process of impeachment. This action was widely hailed as a coup d'état by heads of state throughout Latin America, with leaders from nations such as Argentina and Ecuador announcing they would refuse to recognize his successor as the legitimate President of Paraguay.

In May 2023, Santiago Peña of the long-ruling Colorado Party, won the presidential election to succeed Mario Abdo as the next President of Paraguay. On 15 August 2023, Santiago Peña was sworn in as Paraguay's new president.

The workplace of the President of Paraguay is the Palacio de los López, in Asunción. The Presidential Residence is Mburuvichá Roga, also in Asunción. Once presidents leave office, they are granted by the Constitution the speaking-but-non-voting position of Senator for life.

=== Office of the First Lady ===
In Paraguay, the post of the First Lady of Paraguay is official.

== Legislative branch ==
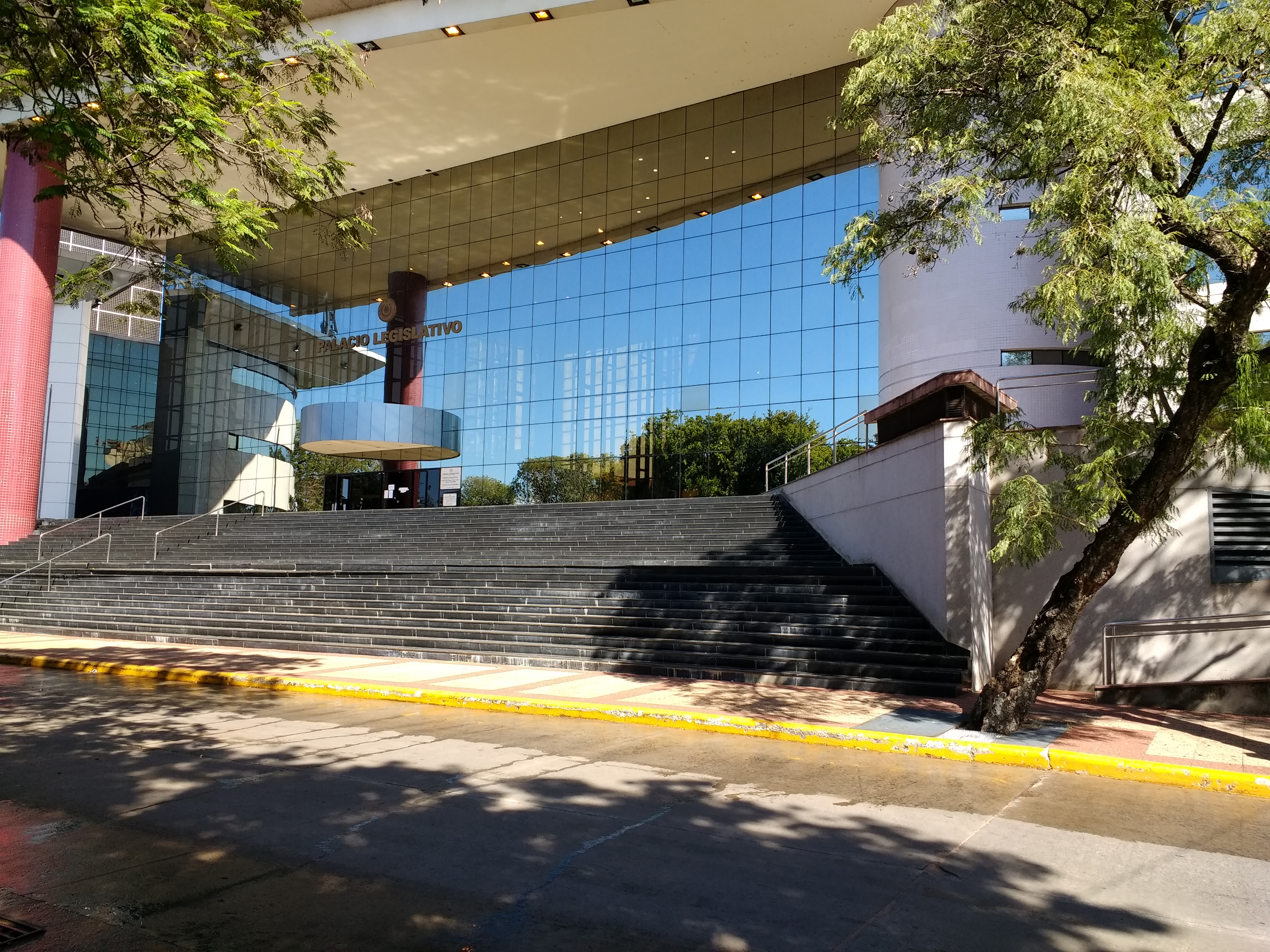
Congress of Paraguay

The National Congress (Congreso Nacional) has two chambers. The Chamber of Deputies (Cámara de Diputados) has 80 members, elected for a five-year term by proportional representation. The Chamber of Senators (Cámara de Senadores) has 45 members, elected for a five-year term by proportional representation.

== Political parties and elections ==
=== Latest elections ===
==== President ====
Candidate	Party	Votes	%
Mario Abdo Benítez	Colorado Party	1,206,067	48.96
Efraín Alegre	Great Renewed National Alliance	1,110,464	45.08
Juan Bautista Ybáñez	Paraguay Green Party	84,045	3.41
Jaro Anzoátegui	National Artists' Movement	15,490	0.63
Atanasio Galeano	Popular Patriotic Movement Party	9,908	0.40
Ramón Ernesto Benítez	Patriotic Reserve Movement	9,361	0.38
Pedro Almada	Broad Front Party	8,590	0.35
Efraín Enríquez	National Sovereign Movement	7,291	0.30
Celino Ferreira	Movimiento Civico Nacional Unamonos	6,295	0.26
Justo Germán Ortega	Heirs Democratic Socialist Party	5,930	0.24
Total		2,463,441	100.00
Valid votes		2,463,441	94.82
Invalid votes		71,924	2.77
Blank votes		62,624	2.41
Total votes		2,597,989	100.00
Registered voters/turnout		4,241,507	61.25
Source: TSJE

==== Senate ====
Party	Votes	%	Seats	+/–
Colorado Party	766,841	32.52	17	–2
Authentic Radical Liberal Party	570,205	24.18	13	0
Guasú Front	279,008	11.83	6	+1
Beloved Fatherland Party	159,625	6.77	3	+3
Hagamos Party	105,375	4.47	2	New
Progressive Democratic Party	86,216	3.66	2	–1
National Crusade Movement	58,409	2.48	1	New
National Union of Ethical Citizens	49,889	2.12	1	–1
Green Party	37,812	1.60	0	0
We are Paraguay	34,623	1.47	0	New
National Encounter Party	30,365	1.29	0	–1
Plurinational Indigenous Political Movement	25,785	1.09	0	New
Christian Democratic Party	16,619	0.70	0	New
Secure Paraguay	15,005	0.64	0	New
Party of the Movement for Socialism	14,773	0.63	0	New
Patriotic Reserve Movement	14,397	0.61	0	New
Revolutionary Febrerista Party	14,332	0.61	0	0
Kuña Pyrenda Movement	9,795	0.42	0	0
Civic Compromise	9,542	0.40	0	New
Concertación Nacional Avancemos País	9,478	0.40	0	New
Party of the A	8,934	0.38	0	New
All for Paraguay United Movement	7,269	0.31	0	New
National Artists' Movement	6,775	0.29	0	New
Us	5,948	0.25	0	New
Heirs Democratic Socialist Party	5,275	0.22	0	New
National Political Sovereignty Movement	5,065	0.21	0	New
Movimiento Civico Nacional Unamonos	5,040	0.21	0	New
Broad Front Party	3,403	0.14	0	New
Union and Equality Political Movement	2,500	0.11	0	New
Total	2,358,303	100.00	45	0
Valid votes	2,358,303	91.11		
Invalid votes	92,716	3.58		
Blank votes	137,277	5.30		
Total votes	2,588,296	100.00		
Registered voters/turnout	4,241,507	61.02		
Source: TSJE

==== Chamber of Deputies ====
Party	Votes	%	Seats	+/–
Colorado Party	927,183	39.10	42	–2
Authentic Radical Liberal Party	420,821	17.74	17	–
Great Renewed National Alliance	286,513	12.08	13	–
Beloved Fatherland Party	105,765	4.46	3	+2
Hagamos Party	75,601	3.19	2	New
National Encounter Party	75,514	3.18	2	0
National Union of Ethical Citizens	65,593	2.77	0	–2
Guasú Front	42,891	1.81	0	–1
Green Party	42,053	1.77	0	0
National Crusade Movement	33,417	1.41	1	New
Progressive Democratic Party	27,932	1.18	0	0
Christian Democratic Party	26,783	1.13	0	New
Civic Compromise	21,651	0.91	0	New
Broad Front Party	20,594	0.87	0	New
We are Paraguay	18,060	0.76	0	New
Concertación Nacional Avancemos País	16,070	0.68	0	New
Revolutionary Febrerista Party	15,169	0.64	0	New
National Artists' Movement	11,727	0.49	0	New
Youth Party	10,871	0.46	0	0
Us	10,816	0.46	0	New
Secure Paraguay	9,651	0.41	0	New
Patriotic Reserve Movement	9,648	0.41	0	New
Civic Participation Party	9,567	0.40	0	New
Party of the A	9,043	0.38	0	New
Heirs Democratic Socialist Party	8,832	0.37	0	New
Itapua for All Alliance	8,683	0.37	0	New
Plurinational Indigenous Political Movement	8,094	0.34	0	New
Movimiento Civico Nacional Unamonos	7,241	0.31	0	New
Party of the Movement for Socialism	6,207	0.26	0	New
All for Paraguay United Movement	5,871	0.25	0	New
Ganar Alliance	5,476	0.23	0	–
Party of the Patriotic Popular Movement	5,147	0.22	0	New
National Political Sovereignty Movement	4,457	0.19	0	New
Let's Continue Building Alliance	4,183	0.18	0	New
Union and Equality Political Movement	3,775	0.16	0	New
Itapuense Front Alliance	3,036	0.13	0	New
Concertación por Vos	2,407	0.10	0	New
Party of Popular Unity	1,329	0.06	0	New
Tekojoja People's Movement	1,046	0.04	0	New
Movimiento Politico Civico Nacional Unamonos	949	0.04	0	New
All for Ñeembucu	772	0.03	0	New
Mbarete Independent Political Movement	595	0.03	0	New
Teete Patriotic Front Party	574	0.02	0	New
Total	2,371,607	100.00	80	0
Valid votes	2,371,607	91.84		
Invalid votes	78,457	3.04		
Blank votes	132,296	5.12		
Total votes	2,582,360	100.00		
Registered voters/turnout	4,241,507	60.88		
Source: TSJE

== Judicial branch ==
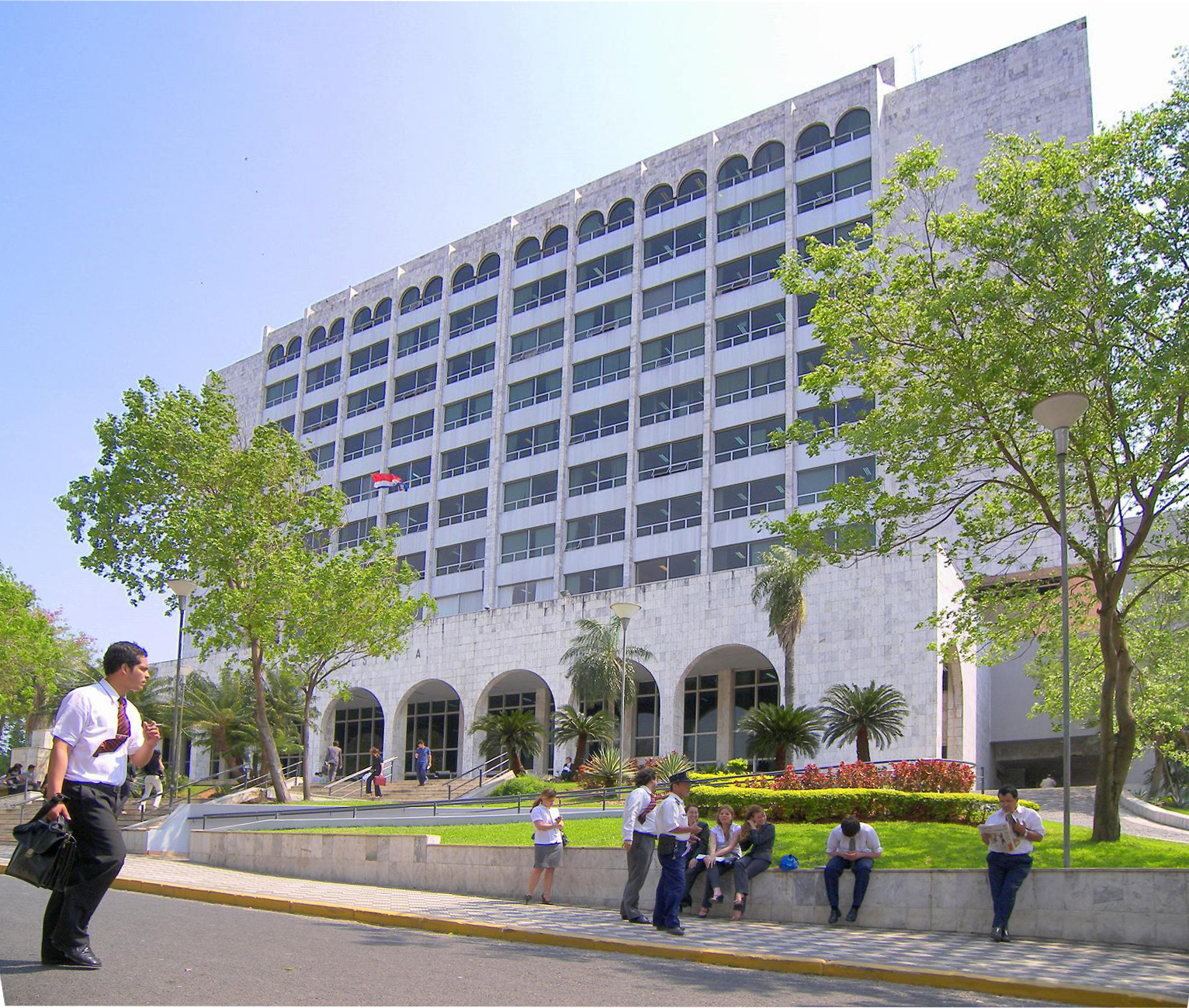
Supreme Court of Paraguay

Paraguay's highest court is the Supreme Court of Paraguay.

== Administrative divisions ==
The Constitution of Paraguay states "The law will regulate the various areas in which these officials and employees can provide their services, including the judicial, the diplomatic and consular professions, the areas of scientific and technological research, civil services, military and police. This will not preclude others. " Each of Paraguay's 17 departments is headed by a popularly elected governor. Paraguay is divided in 17 departments (departamentos, singular – departamento) and one capital city; Alto Paraguay, Alto Paraná, Amambay, Asunción (city), Boquerón, Caaguazú, Caazapá, Canindeyú, Concepción, Cordillera, Guairá, Itapúa, Ñeembucú, Paraguarí, Presidente Hayes, San Pedro.

== See also ==
- El Stronato
