= 2017 Paraguayan crisis =

2017 Paraguay crisis
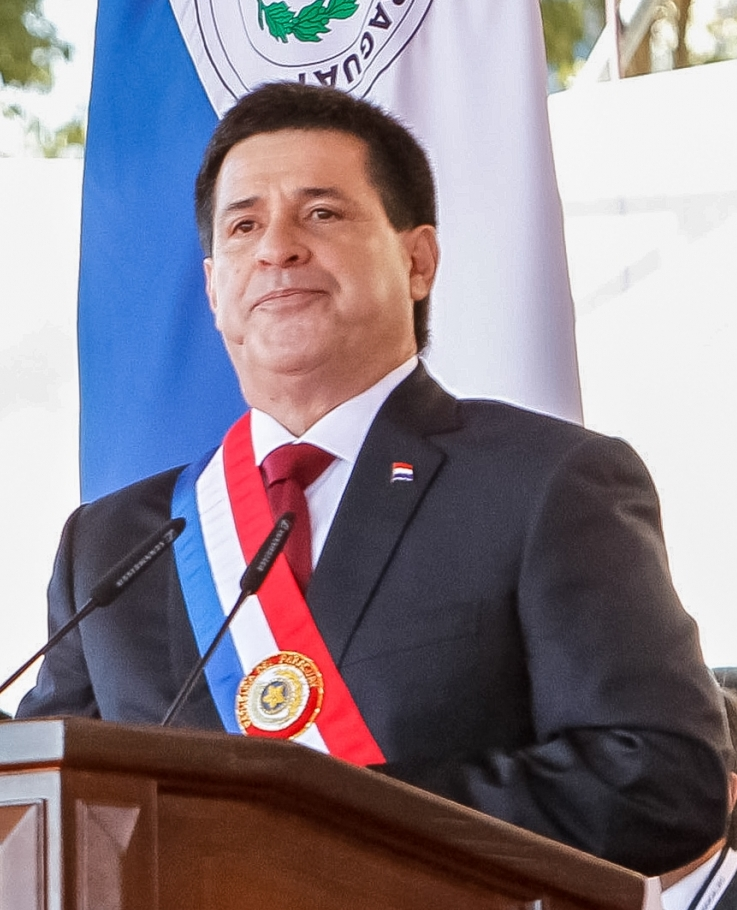
- A constitutional amendment that would have allowed President of Paraguay Horacio Cartes to run for re-election led to the crisis
- Date: 31 March 2017 – 26 April 2017
- Location: Asunción, Paraguay
- Caused by: Signing of bill allowing presidential re-election
- Goals: Overturn bill allowing presidential re-election
- Result: Bill allowing presidential re-election is overturned; President Horacio Cartes abandons any possible candidacy for a second presidential term

Parties
| Government of Paraguay: National Republican Association – Colorado Party | (Paraguay) Protesters Supported by: Authentic Radical Liberal Party |

Lead figures
| Horacio Cartes | Roberto Acevedo |

Casualties
- Deaths: 1
- Injuries: 30+
- Arrested: 211

On 31 March 2017, a series of protests began in Paraguay, during which demonstrators set fire to the Congress building. The demonstrations occurred in response to a constitutional amendment that would permit President Horacio Cartes to run for re-election, a move described by the opposition as "a coup". One protester was killed in Paraguay's capital, Asunción, after being hit by a shotgun blast by police. Several protesters, politicians and journalists, as well as police, were reported injured, including one lower-house deputy who had to undergo surgery after being injured by rubber bullets. On 17 April, President Cartes announced that he was resigning from any possible candidacy for a second presidential term. On 26 April, the Chamber of Deputies of Paraguay rejected the proposed constitutional amendment for presidential re-election.

== Background ==
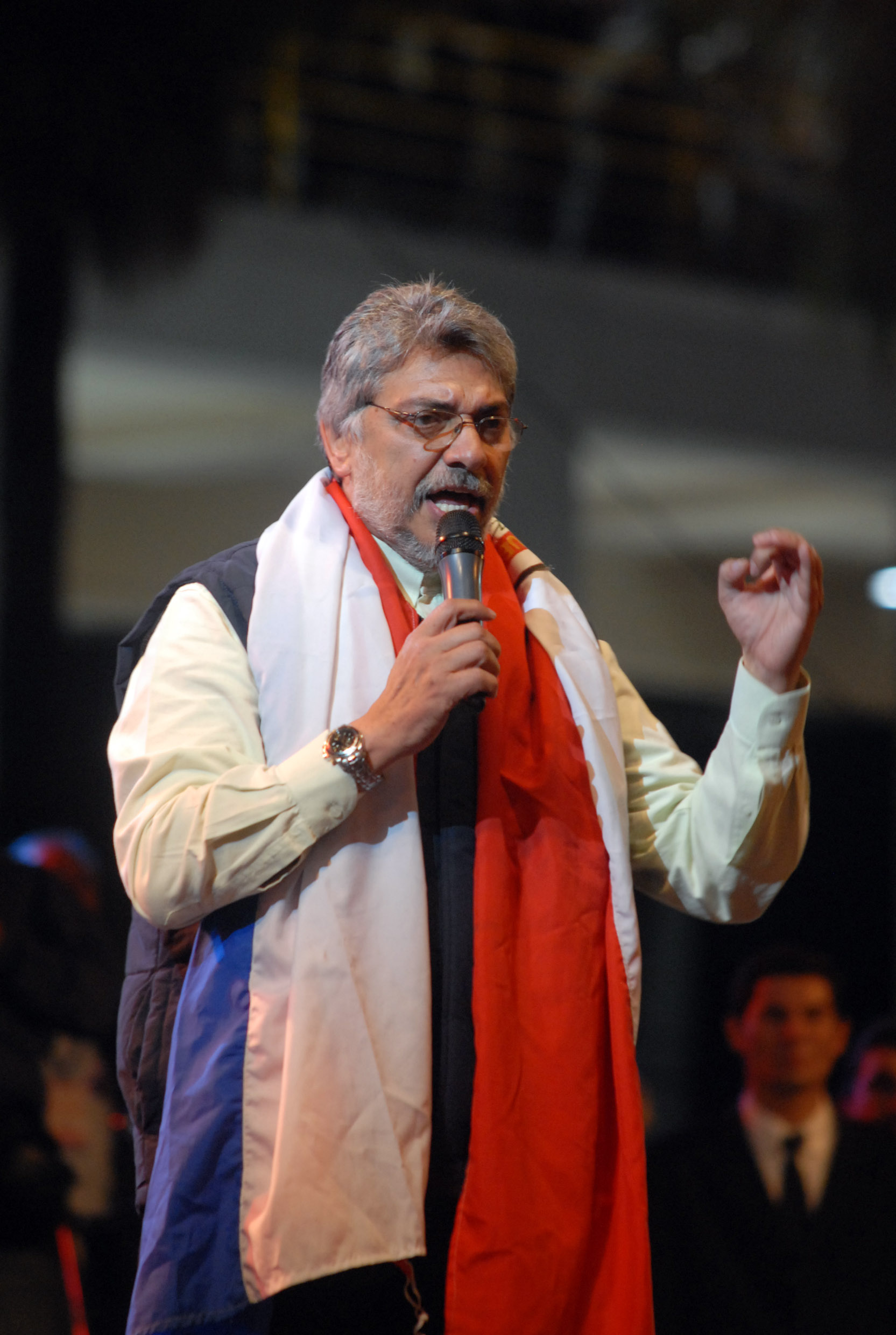
Former president of Paraguay Fernando Lugo. As Senator, Lugo and his Guasú Front alliance supported the amendment

The 1992 Constitution limits the President of Paraguay to a single five-year term in office with no possibility of re-election, even if it is nonsuccessive. The proposed amendment would have allowed those previously elected as president to run again for re-election. A previous vote on the measure was rejected in August 2016. The norms of the Congress established that the subject could not be treated again until after a year. However, in the last week of March, the ruling legislators managed to amend the regulations and bring the initiative to the Senate for approval. The proposed constitutional amendment would have allowed presidents and vice presidents to run for a second term, whether successive or separated. This amendment would have allowed then-president Horacio Cartes and former president Fernando Lugo to run for a second five-year term. In either case, a president would have had to leave office for good at the end of the second term.

In order for the amendment to be ratified, it needed to pass in the lower house, on paper a likely outcome in a chamber where the Colorado Party controlled 44 of 80 seats. This would then be followed by a national referendum. Senate President Roberto Acevedo of the opposition Authentic Radical Liberal Party filed an appeal with the Supreme Court, arguing that the vote violated Senate rules.

The ban on any sort of re-election for the president dates to the aftermath of the military dictatorship of Alfredo Stroessner, which extended between 1954 and 1989. The Stroessner administration, of the Colorado Party, was one of the longest and most repressive in Latin American history. His rule left more than 400 missing, more than 18,000 tortured and more than 20,000 exiles, according to data published in 2008 by the Paraguayan Truth and Justice Commission. However, following Stroessner's fall and exile, the Colorado Party continued to win elections and completed over six consecutive decades in power, until in 2008, center-left Fernando Lugo, of the Guasu Front, won the elections. Lugo was dismissed after an impeachment in 2012, and in 2013, the Colorado Party returned to the government with Cartes.

On 28 March, a discussion in the Congress ended with shouts in the corridors of the Legislative Palace of Asunción between left-wing senators and conservatives of the Colorado Party that were divided into two factions: government officials, who support the re-election of Cartes, and dissidents, who reject it. The Congress by then had been completely surrounded by policemen: truck-based water cannons and hundreds of anti-riot troops prevented the passage of the people. Hundreds of Paraguayans, including dissident deputies, senators and Paraguayan political leaders, demonstrated until the early hours of the morning of 29 March 2017 in downtown Asunción against the approval of the presidential re-election project.

A closed-session Senate vote on the amendment was scheduled for 31 March 2017. This also coincided with a meeting of the Inter-American Development Bank in Asunción, which brought thousands of foreign business people and government officials to the Paraguayan capital. The measure by senators for the governing Colorado Party, which needed 23 members' support to pass in the 45-member assembly, passed with 25 votes.

== Protests ==
After the Senate vote, protests broke out in Asunción against the legislation. Desirée Masi, leader of the opposition Progressive Democratic Party stated, "A coup has been carried out. We will resist and we invite the people to resist with us." During the protests, the windows were broken and Congress was set on fire by protesters. Fencing surrounding the compound was also removed. Police used water cannons, tear gas and rubber bullets to disperse the demonstrators.

Twenty-five-year-old Rodrigo Quintana, leader of Liberal Youth, the young wing of the main opposition Authentic Radical Liberal Party (PLRA) in the district of La Colmena, Paraguarí Department, died after being seriously wounded with a shotgun blast on the torso by a police officer after police stormed the PLRA headquarters. The President of the Liberal Party Efraín Alegre confirmed the death. The moment of the police storming the party's headquarters was captured in a closed-circuit video.

As in Asunción, in the early hours of 1 April 2017, Ciudad del Este was the scene of police repression against anti-amendment protesters who congregated at the head of the Friendship Bridge. At least 12 people were detained. About 1:00 a.m., mounted police and special operations agents began the clearance of the border crossing, firing at protesters. The shootings lasted for about an hour, leaving many wounded with rubber bullets. The citizens rushed to the shopping centers, trying to take refuge from the shots, and some were taken from those places to be apprehended. Among the injured was a photographer of a local newspaper.

In the early hours of 1 April 2017, members of the mounted group of the National Police of Paraguay attacked the headquarters of the ABC Color newspaper with both rubber and live ammunition. The main door of the newspaper's headquarters was destroyed by a rubber bullet shot and the glass shards wounded two employees.

== Reactions ==
=== International ===
==== Governments ====
- Argentina: With harangues in Guarani, Paraguayans living in Buenos Aires demonstrated in front of the Paraguayan embassy in Argentina on the afternoon of 1 April 2017. The main reason for the mobilization was indignation at the death of Quintana, and they requested the resignation of the President of Paraguay. The Foreign Ministry issued a statement in which he "regrets the acts of violence" and hopes that "President Cartes will allow for its full clarification and the determination of the corresponding responsibilities."
- Bolivia: President Evo Morales denounced the inaction of the Secretary General of the Organization of American States (OAS), Luis Almagro, in the political crisis unleashed in Paraguay. "Paraguayan Congress convulses its people. Mr. Luis Almagro, Secretary General of the OAS, now, will there be Democratic Charter for Paraguay?" wrote Morales in his Twitter account.
- United States: The United States embassy condemned the acts of violence and the Congress of Paraguay's fire started by citizens, and called on the Government and all parties involved to work together in a transparent way to solve the problems that triggered the disturbances.
- Spain: Paraguayans residing in Spain congregated at the Paraguayan Consulate in Barcelona, raising voices against the "outrage" in the Senate and the events that occurred on the night of 31 March. Several Paraguayan citizens staged a demonstration on 2 April 2017 in front of the Paraguayan Consulate in Madrid, Spain, against the amendment. They demanded justice for the death of Quintana.
- Vatican City: On 2 April 2017, Pope Francis asked to avoid "all violence" and advocated seeking "political solutions" in Venezuela and Paraguay, whose political situations he alluded to after the Angelus prayer.
- Uruguay: Two political parties of Uruguay, the Broad Front and the National Party, pronounced on the events occurred in the Congress of Paraguay expressing their concern for the Paraguayan political situation, expressed condolences for the death of Quintana and requested that political differences be resolved through dialogue. The Uruguayan Government expressed "great concern" at the violence in Paraguay during protests.

==== Supranational bodies ====
- Organization of American States: The General Secretary of the Organization of American States (OAS), Luis Almagro, called Paraguay's political forces to broker peace and urged the government to investigate the death of Quintana. The Secretary General criticized the actions of people who broke into Congress as the "bloody reaction of the police forces that resulted in the death of an activist and youth leader of the opposition."
- Inter-American Development Bank: The Annual Meeting of the Inter-American Development Bank (IDB) kicked off formally in Paraguay with an agenda focused on economic integration and climate change, the same day the protest began. "I want to join the call for peace and dialogue," said IDB President Luis Alberto Moreno at a press conference at the headquarters of the Paraguayan Olympic Committee, where the meeting took place. The IDB promised to provide its support, solidarity and support to Paraguay. The president of the entity clarified that they will remain a vital partner of Paraguay as they did six decades ago and will continue to do so for much longer, "betting on the enormous potential of the country."

=== Domestic ===
Former President of Paraguay Federico Franco blamed Cartes for the political crisis in the country. Franco, who took office in 2012 after the removal of Lugo following Lugo's impeachment and was himself succeeded by Cartes, said that the president "has to withdraw this amendment immediately" to lower the tension in the country and aspire to continue in his position. Franco also held Cartes responsible for the death of Quintana.

The Governor of the Presidente Hayes Department Antonio Saldívar condemned and lamented "the terrible act of the security organisms" that killed Quintana. He also urged the authorities to seek solutions in accordance with the law.

The Intendant of Asunción, Mario Ferreiro, requested that the constitutional amendment be withdrawn from the congress.

The Bishop of Caacupé, Monsignor Claudio Giménez, blamed the three powers of the Paraguayan state of political crisis, expressing his concern about the situation of the country as a result of the political crisis and regretted that "the lust for power and incoherence could overcome." In the Sunday mass in the Catholic church of the city of Acahay, the pastor Elamidio Sandoval questioned the last events registered in the country because of the "ambition" of re-electionists. Sandoval asked those responsible "to change course and stop generating robberies and deaths and to act with patriotism."

The Paraguayan Evangelical community issued a statement condemning the violent acts that took place. They also rejected conduct that violates the national Constitution.

Conversely, President Cartes released a statement on Twitter, in response to the protests: "Democracy is not conquered or defended with violence and you can be sure this government will continue to put its best effort into maintaining order in the republic. We must not allow a few barbarians to destroy the peace, tranquility and general wellbeing of the Paraguayan people." He accused the media and a "political group" of the excesses that occurred in the vicinities and within the Congress of Paraguay.

Colorado Party President Pedro Alliana called the party's Executive Committee to a meeting for an "analysis of events that occurred on 31 March in the National Congress." The objective was to address what happened in Asunción after the confrontation between demonstrators and police officers, in addition to the subsequent death of Quintana. Much like President Cartes, the Colorado Party blamed opposition politicians and the media for the protests in the Congress, the subsequent acts of violence, and the death of Quintana. Alliana read a statement that mentions that they mourn the death of a young Paraguayan, and demand the clarification of the facts and punishment of those responsible. The statement also expresses its support for Horacio Cartes and his government. After reading the statement, Alliana said that the Colorado Party would continue with its plan to approve the constitutional amendment. Colorado Party Senator and former president of the Colorado Party Lilian Samaniego also stated that the Colorado Party would continue with its plan to approve the constitutional amendment.

Paraguayan Foreign Minister Eladio Loizaga said that "democracy is firmer than ever" despite the attack on Congress in Asunción and defended the legality of the constitutional amendment and indicated that it was a violent group that does not understand that it is democracy that caused the events that caused the fire of the congress. These statements were made in Buenos Aires at a Mercosur meeting.

Former President of Paraguay and Senator Fernando Lugo issued a statement via YouTube where he criticized the events in Congress, appealed for peace and made a nod to the referendum. In the video he did not touch the subject of the homicide of Quintana.

== Aftermath ==
Paraguay's Interior Ministry took upon the investigation of Quintana's death. Gustavo Florentín, Deputy Chief of the anti-riot force of the National Police of Paraguay, confessed to accidentally shooting Quintana. In his defense, he claimed that the shotgun was accidentally fired in a struggle. Paraguay's Interior Minister Tadeo Rojas stated that "[his] position is available to the President of the Republic." On 1 April, President Cartes dismissed Interior Minister Rojas and Commander of the National Police Críspulo Sotelo after the death of Quintana. Lorenzo Lezcano was confirmed as the new Interior Minister, while Police Chief Luis Carlos Rojas was appointed as the new Commander of the National Police.

The Authentic Radical Liberal Party announced the filing of an impeachment petition against President Cartes after the incidents in the mobilization as a result of the approval of the constitutional amendment, blaming him and the senators who approved the proposed constitutional amendment of the events that took place at the Congress of Paraguay. The impeachment request was supposed be presented by the Liberal legislators in the Chamber of Deputies.

The lower house vote on the constitutional amendment set for 1 April was postponed due to the violence on the protests. The Senate and the Chamber of Deputies ruled to suspend activities due to danger of collapse of the Congress building. The Paraguayan congress did not work again until 5 April 2017.

A total of 211 people were arrested after the protests against the constitutional amendment of presidential re-election, of which 90 were released after giving a statement before a competent authority.

A large crowd reunited at the funeral of Quintana on 2 April 2017. After the wake in the party headquarters, the coffin was transferred to his hometown, La Colmena, where he was buried. In a press conference, the Liberal authorities announced that they would not rest until justice is done.

In social networking services, it was launched a campaign called "#NO", which rejects the constitutional amendment and re-election. Users criticize the acting of the political class and what they considered violations of existing laws as well as constitutional principles.

President Cartes called in a televised message to a dialogue table between the presidents of the political parties "with parliamentary representation" of the two Chambers of Congress, as well as representatives of the Executive and the High Hierarchy of the Paraguayan Catholic Church to discuss the situation and seek a solution to the political crisis. The Paraguayan opposition, led by the PLRA, said that the conditions for a dialogue with the ruling party are not provided, unless specific points are fulfilled.

On 3 April 2017, hundreds of protesters demonstrated in the Plaza de Armas near the Paraguayan Congress, demanding the withdrawal of the constitutional amendment proposed by the Colorado Party, while also denouncing the violence that occurred on 31 March. They also collected signatures for a petition calling for the annulment of the constitutional amendment request. Students gathered in the Plaza de las Américas of Asunción to march to Mburuvicha Róga, the official residence of the President of Paraguay. The objective was truncated by police as the place is of restricted access. On 5 April, a student assembly took place in Itacurubí del Rosario, San Pedro Department, where, despite heavy rain, they expressed their rejection of the proposed constitutional amendment promoted by Cartes' supporters. On 7 April, secondary students from various institutions in another city of San Pedro, San Estanislao, also concentrated in Mariscal López Park to repudiate the constitutional amendment.

A group of citizens placed a plaque in one of the pillars of a new "super viaduct" located between the avenues Madame Lynch and Aviadores del Chaco in Asunción to "name" it in honor of Quintana. The "super viaduct" was inaugurated on 31 March, at the same time that the protests in front of the Congress took place.

Hundreds of Paraguayan citizens took to the streets of several cities in the interior of the country simultaneously to raise their voice of protest against the constitutional amendment that plans to implement the presidential reelection. Members of the Authentic Radical Liberal Party (PLRA) demonstrated peacefully by closing roads en route to Yasy Cañy, Canindeyú Department.

Paraguayan singer Andrea Valobra decided not to act in front of President Cartes as part of the Assembly of the Inter-American Development Bank (IDB) that is being held in Asunción. Through a statement on social media, the singer said she could not ignore what happened in the country.

The Club Olimpia association football team of Paraguay showed a banner before a Paraguayan Primera División match game against Club Sol de América that said "QEPD Rodrigo Quitana" ("R.I.P. Rodrigo Quintana") and asked for peace in Paraguay. The authorities of the Paraguayan Football Association later announced that they planned to sanction the club for violating the rules of competition, which aroused criticism from the Paraguayan public.

Paraguayan citizens also engaged in escraches, a type of manifestation in which a group of activists goes to the address or workplace of someone to whom they want to denounce or rebuke, by going to the residences of Paraguayan senators and deputies to criticize their performance in the Paraguayan Congress regarding the implementation of the presidential re-election project. Many legislators have been surprised in parks and shopping malls where people have spontaneously shown up to express their disgust and discontent for the support to the constitutional amendment. Incidents such as these included the escrache of a senator when making a walk in a park, and an escrache in front of Lugo's residence in Lambaré.

On 17 April 2017, President Cartes announced through a note sent to the metropolitan archbishop of the Archdiocese of Asunción, Monsignor Edmundo Valenzuela, that he would not run for a second term even if the amendment passed. Senate President Acevedo argued that the only way to believe the declarations of President Cartes was for the pro-government deputies to archive the draft bill. Despite President Cartes' statements, on 19 April, 44 deputies from the lower house of the Congress of Paraguay voted in favor of continuing to give legal course to the constitutional amendment of presidential reelection, which was reported to have aroused complaints among Paraguayan citizens in social networks.

On 26 April 2017, the Chamber of Deputies of Paraguay rejected the constitutional amendment for presidential re-election. The legislative initiative was shelved by 78 votes in favor and one abstention. After the vote in the legislative body, hundreds of people gathered in the Plaza de Armas opposite the Congress, where they followed the session around a giant screen, and celebrated the result as "a victory of the people."
