= 2013 Paraguayan general election =

- 21 April 2013
- Presidential election
- Turnout: 68.52% (▲3.04pp)
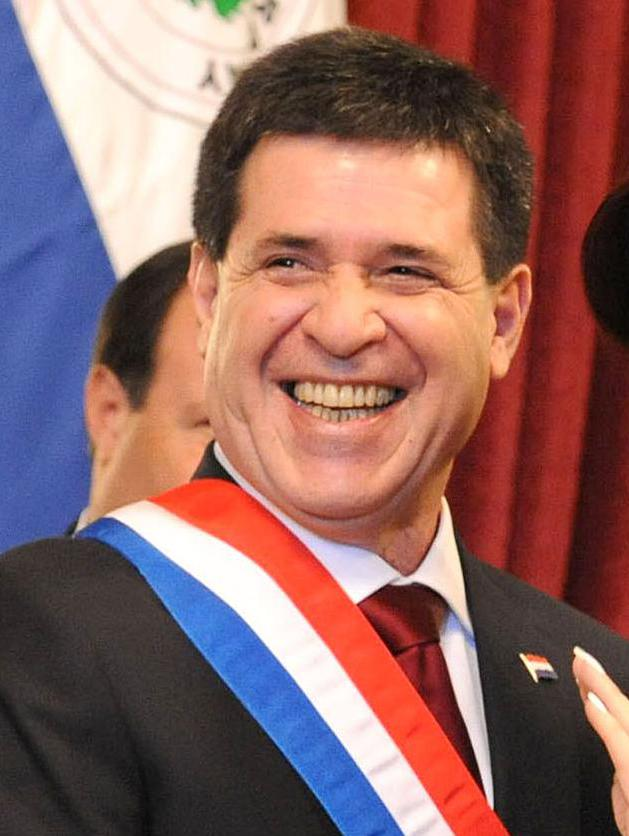

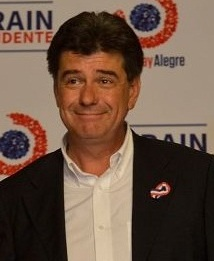

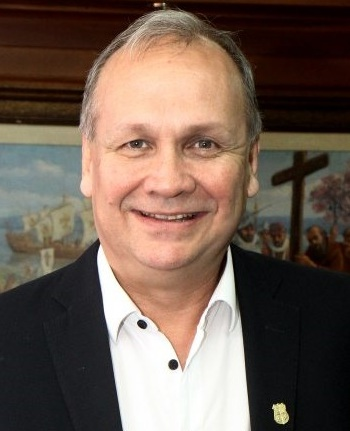
Candidate	Horacio Cartes	Efraín Alegre	Mario Ferreiro
Party	Colorado	PLRA	Avanza País
Alliance	–	Paraguay Alegre	–
Running mate	Juan Afara	Rafael Filizzola	Cynthia Brizuela Speratti
Popular vote	1,104,169	889,451	141,716
Percentage	48.48%	39.05%	6.22%
- Results by department
President before election
Federico Franco
PLRA
Elected President
Horacio Cartes
Colorado
- Chamber of Deputies
- All 80 seats in the Chamber of Deputies; 41 seats needed for a majority
Party	Leader	Vote %	Seats	+/–
Colorado	Lilian Samaniego	40.99	44	+14
PLRA	Ramón Gomez Verlangieri	29.25	27	0
UNACE	Carmelo Banitez	6.58	2	−13
Guasú Front	Fernando Lugo	5.46	1	New
PEN		4.84	2	+2
Avanza País	Mario Ferreiro	3.78	2	New
PPQ	Roberto Campos	2.84	1	−2
APC		0.70	1	New
This lists parties that won seats. See the complete results below.
- Senate
- All 45 seats in the Senate; 23 seats needed for a majority
Party	Vote %	Seats	+/–
Colorado	38.50	19	+4
PLRA	26.17	13	−1
Guasú Front	10.60	5	New
PDP	6.44	3	+2
Avanza País	5.21	2	New
UNACE	4.03	2	−7
PEN	3.49	1	+1
This lists parties that won seats. See the complete results below.

General elections were held in Paraguay on 21 April 2013. They resulted in a victory for the Colorado Party, which had ruled the country for 60 years before losing power in 2008. The presidential elections were won by the Colorado Party's Horacio Cartes, who defeated Efraín Alegre of the Paraguay Alegre alliance. The Colorado Party also won the most seats in the Senate and Chamber of Deputies.

== Background ==
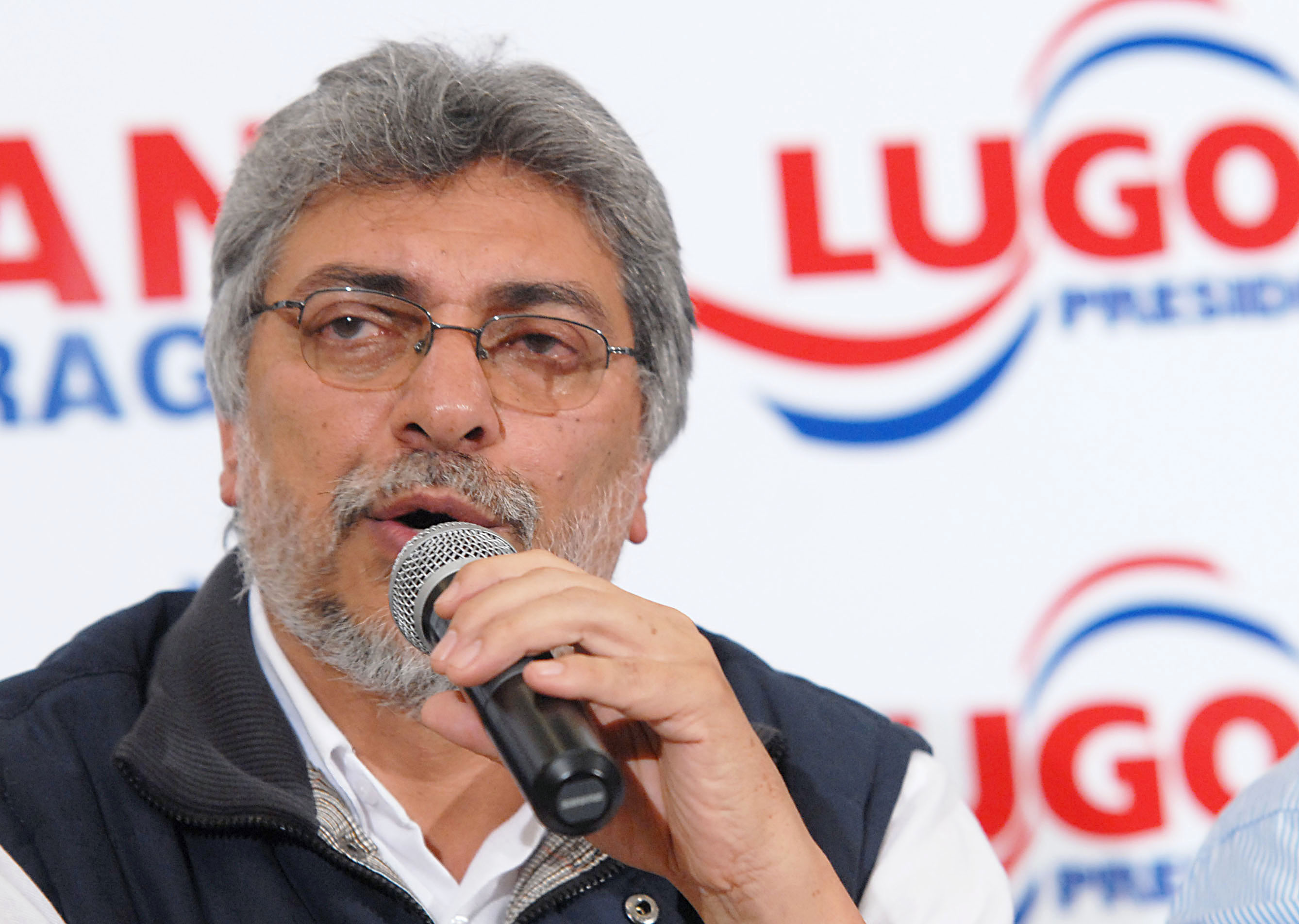
Former President Lugo, impeached in June 2012

In the previous general elections in 2008 Fernando Lugo was elected President. However, he was controversially impeached and removed from office in a 48-hour period in June 2012, following an eviction at a farm that led to the death of six police and eleven farmers. Lugo was replaced by his vice-president Federico Franco. Following the impeachment, Paraguay was suspended from Mercosur and Unasur, who denounced the impeachment as a Congressional coup.

Franco was barred from running for a full term in 2013. The Constitution of Paraguay does not allow a president to run for reelection, even if he serves a partial term.

== Candidates ==
Eleven candidates contested the presidential election:

Presidential candidate	Vice-presidential candidate	Party
Efraín Alegre	Rafael Filizzola	Paraguay Alegre^{[a]}
Ricardo Almada	Librada Martinez	White Party
Eduardo Arce	Gloria Bareiro	Workers' Party
Aníbal Carrillo	Rafael Aguayo	Guasú Front^{[b]}
Miguel Carrizosa	Arsenio Ocampos	Beloved Fatherland Party
Horacio Cartes	Juan Afara	Colorado Party
Roberto Ferreira	Luis Vallejos	Paraguayan Humanist Party
Mario Ferreiro	Cynthia Brizuela	Forward Country^{[c]}
Atanasio Galeano	Digno Valdez	Partido Patria Libre
Lino César Oviedo Sánchez	Luis Villamayor	National Union of Ethical Citizens
Lilian Soto	Maguiorina Balbuena	Kuña Pyrenda

Coalitions formed for the election included the:

^{c} Forward Country (Avanza País), a centre-left alliance including, amongst others, the Revolutionary Febrerista Party and the Christian Democratic Party.

^{b} Frente Guasú, a left-wing alliance including, amongst others, the Party for a Country of Solidarity and the Paraguayan Communist Party.

^{a} Paraguay Alegre (lit. Happy Paraguay, alluding to their candidate's name), a centrist alliance including, amongst others, the Authentic Radical Liberal Party, the Democratic Progressive Party and the National Encounter Party.

On the night of 2 February 2013, Lino Oviedo Silva, the candidate of the right-wing National Union of Ethical Citizens, died in a helicopter accident near Puerto Antequera, in the Chaco region. His death was confirmed the following day, when the national police rescue team found the three burnt corpses of Oviedo, the plane's pilot, and a bodyguard. His candidacy was taken over by his nephew Lino Oviedo Sánchez.

== Campaign ==
Reporters without Borders said in April 2013 that "Paraguay continues to be a dangerous country for journalists, in part because of the links between politics and organized crime, which were widely criticized during the campaign." It noted that two television stations (the public TV Pública and private Canal 9 SNT) had refused to air a Frente Guasú campaign ad highlighting the role of candidates Cartes and Alegre in the impeachment of Fernando Lugo.

During the campaign Cartes made homophobic statements, comparing homosexuals to monkeys and saying he would shoot himself in the testicles if his son turned out to be gay.

== Opinion polls ==
Agency/Source	Date	Horacio Cartes	Efrain Alegre	Mario Ferreiro	Lino Oviedo Sánchez	Aníbal Carrillo	Miguel Carrizosa	Lilian Soto	Eduardo Arce	None	"Don't know"/No answer
Asisa	26 Feb 2013	29.3%	22.1%	19.8%	7.1%	3.2%	2.5%	1.6%	-	-	13.7%
Ati Snead	28 Feb 2013	36.7%	37.1%	5.6%	?	2.8%	?	?	?	?	?
First	15 Mar 2013	37.3%	30.3%	9.5%	3.1%	1.9%	3.2%	0.7%	0.4%	0.4%	13.2%
GEO	15 Mar 2013	36.8%	35.6%	7.7%	6.8%	6.1%	1.0%	0.3%	-	0.6%	5.1%
Grau	21 Mar 2013	42.7%	29.2%	9.6%	6.2%	2.7%	0.5%	0.2%	-	1.1%	7.8%
First	4 Apr 2013	37.6%	31.7%	10.9%	7.1%	1.9%	3.0%	0.2%	-	0.3%	7.3%
Taka	5 Apr 2013	41.7%	27.5%	12.1%	3.1%	2.9%	5.7%	-	-	1.2%	5.9%
Ati Snead	5 Apr 2013	36.4	37.9%	8.5%	4.0%	2.7%	3.0%	-	-	-	6.0%
Grau	11 Apr 2013	45.3%	31.2%	8.6%	2.5%	2.9%	0.9%	0.1%	-	2.2%	6.4%
GEO	11 Apr 2013	34.8%	36.7%	9.9%	1.6%	?	?	?	?	?	8.9%

== Results ==
=== President ===
Candidate	Party	Votes	%
Horacio Cartes	Colorado Party	1,104,169	48.48
Efraín Alegre	Authentic Radical Liberal Party	889,451	39.05
Mario Ferreiro	Avanza País	141,716	6.22
Aníbal Carrillo	Guasú Front	79,573	3.49
Miguel Carrizosa	Beloved Fatherland Party	27,026	1.19
Lino César Oviedo Sánchez	National Union of Ethical Citizens	19,416	0.85
Roberto Ferreira	Paraguayan Humanist Party	4,264	0.19
Lilian Soto	Kuña Pyrenda Movement	3,925	0.17
Eduardo Arce	Workers' Party	3,011	0.13
Ricardo Almada	National Christian Union	2,767	0.12
Atanasio Galeano	Partido Patria Libre	2,416	0.11
Total		2,277,734	100.00
Valid votes		2,277,734	94.53
Invalid/blank votes		131,703	5.47
Total votes		2,409,437	100.00
Registered voters/turnout		3,516,275	68.52
Source: Justicia Electoral

=== Senate ===
Party	Votes	%	Seats	+/–
Colorado Party	865,206	38.50	19	+4
Authentic Radical Liberal Party	588,054	26.17	13	–1
Guasú Front	238,313	10.60	5	+4
Progressive Democratic Party	144,691	6.44	3	+2
Avanza País	117,056	5.21	2	+2
National Union of Ethical Citizens	90,640	4.03	2	–7
National Encounter Party	78,460	3.49	1	+1
Beloved Fatherland Party	45,168	2.01	0	–4
Youth Party – Young Force	28,129	1.25	0	New
Social Democrat Party	7,768	0.35	0	New
Independent Constitutionalist Movement	7,509	0.33	0	New
30 August Movement	7,460	0.33	0	New
Kuña Pyrenda	5,416	0.24	0	New
People in Action Movement	3,673	0.16	0	New
United Democratic Movement for Victory	3,662	0.16	0	New
Paraguayan Humanist Party	3,484	0.16	0	0
Workers' Party	2,840	0.13	0	0
Partido Patria Libre	2,322	0.10	0	New
Participative Independent Democratic Movement	2,007	0.09	0	New
National Christian Union	1,961	0.09	0	0
Institutional Independent Movement	1,917	0.09	0	New
Green Party	1,541	0.07	0	New
Total	2,247,277	100.00	45	0
Valid votes	2,247,277	93.36		
Invalid/blank votes	159,889	6.64		
Total votes	2,407,166	100.00		
Registered voters/turnout	3,516,275	68.46		
Source: Supreme Electoral Justice Tribunal of Paraguay

==== Elected Senators ====
Name	Political Party	Political Alliance
Adolfo Marcelino Ferreira Sanabria	Revolutionary Febrerista Party	Avanza País
Arnaldo Euclides Giuzzio Benítez	Democratic Progressive Party	Democratic Progressive Party
Arnoldo Wiens Durksen	Colorado Party	Colorado Party
Blanca Beatriz Fonseca Legal	Authentic Radical Liberal Party	Authentic Radical Liberal Party
Blanca Margarita Ovelar de Duarte	Colorado Party	Colorado Party
Blas Antonio Llano Ramos	Authentic Radical Liberal Party	Authentic Radical Liberal Party
Carlos Alberto Amarilla Cañete	Authentic Radical Liberal Party	Authentic Radical Liberal Party
Carlos Alberto Filizzola Pallarés	Party for a Country of Solidarity	Guasú Front
Carlos Núñez Agüero	Colorado Party	Colorado Party
Derlis Ariel Alejandro Osorio Nunes	Colorado Party	Colorado Party
Desirée Graciela Masi Jara	Democratic Progressive Party	Democratic Progressive Party
Eduardo Romalino Petta San Martín	National Encounter Party	National Encounter Party
Emilia Patricia Alfaro de Franco	Authentic Radical Liberal Party	Authentic Radical Liberal Party
Enrique Fausto Bacchetta Chiriani	Colorado Party	Colorado Party
Enzo Cardozo Jiménez	Authentic Radical Liberal Party	Authentic Radical Liberal Party
Esperanza Martínez de Portillo	Party of Citizen Participation	Guasú Front
Fernando Alberto Silva Facetti	Authentic Radical Liberal Party	Authentic Radical Liberal Party
Fernando Armindo Lugo Méndez	Independent	Guasú Front
Gustavo Javier Alfonso González	Colorado Party	Colorado Party
Jorge Antonio Oviedo Matto	National Union of Ethical Citizens	National Union of Ethical Citizens
José Manuel Bóbeda Melgarejo	National Union of Ethical Citizens	National Union of Ethical Citizens
Juan Carlos Román Galaverna Delvalle	Colorado Party	Colorado Party
Juan Darío Monges Espínola	Colorado Party	Colorado Party
Julio Antonio Quiñónez Daiub	Colorado Party	Colorado Party
Julio César Ramón Franco Gómez	Authentic Radical Liberal Party	Authentic Radical Liberal Party
Julio César Velázquez Tillería	Colorado Party	Colorado Party
Lilian Graciela Samaniego González	Colorado Party	Colorado Party
Luis Alberto Castiglioni Soria	Colorado Party	Colorado Party
Luis Alberto Cayetano Wagner Lezcano	Authentic Radical Liberal Party	Authentic Radical Liberal Party
María Blanca Lila Mignarro de González	Authentic Radical Liberal Party	Authentic Radical Liberal Party
Mario Abdo Benítez	Colorado Party	Colorado Party
Miguel Abdón Saguier Carmona	Authentic Radical Liberal Party	Authentic Radical Liberal Party
Miguel Ángel Ignacio López Perito	April 20 Movement	Avanza País
Mirta Leonor Gusinky de Cubas	Colorado Party	Colorado Party
Nelson Darío Aguinagalde Gallinar	Colorado Party	Colorado Party
Óscar Alberto González Daher	Colorado Party	Colorado Party
Óscar Hugo Richer Florentín	Popular Socialist Convergence Party	Guasú Front
Óscar Rubén Salomón Fernández	Colorado Party	Colorado Party
Pedro Arthuro Santa Cruz Insaurralde	Democratic Progressive Party	Democratic Progressive Party
Ramón Gómez Verlangieri	Authentic Radical Liberal Party	Authentic Radical Liberal Party
Roberto Ramón Acevedo Quevedo	Authentic Radical Liberal Party	Authentic Radical Liberal Party
Silvio Adalberto Ovelar Benítez	Colorado Party	Colorado Party
Sixto Pereira Galeano	Tekojoja People's Party	Guasú Front
Víctor Alcides Bogado González	Colorado Party	Colorado Party
Zulma Ramona Gómez Cáceres	Authentic Radical Liberal Party	Authentic Radical Liberal Party

Source: Justicia Electoral

=== Chamber of Deputies ===
Party	Votes	%	Seats	+/–
Colorado Party	919,625	40.99	44	+14
Authentic Radical Liberal Party	656,301	29.25	27	0
National Union of Ethical Citizens	147,534	6.58	2	–13
Guasú Front	122,440	5.46	1	+1
National Encounter Party	108,662	4.84	2	+2
Avanza País	84,826	3.78	2	+2
Beloved Fatherland Party	63,662	2.84	1	–2
Progressive Democratic Party	30,579	1.36	0	–1
Youth Party	28,543	1.27	0	New
Chaqueña Passion Alliance	15,656	0.70	1	–
Civic Awakening Movement	9,661	0.43	0	New
Kuña Pyrenda	8,153	0.36	0	New
30 August Movement	7,080	0.32	0	New
Social Democrat Party	7,062	0.31	0	New
Independent Constitutionalist Movement	5,063	0.23	0	New
Paraguayan Humanist Party	4,225	0.19	0	0
People in Action Movement	3,107	0.14	0	New
United Democratic Movement for Victory	2,702	0.12	0	New
National Christian Union	2,677	0.12	0	0
Citizens in Power Action Movement	2,017	0.09	0	New
Participative Independent Democratic Movement	1,905	0.08	0	New
Green Party	1,826	0.08	0	New
Concertacion todos por Concepcion	1,822	0.08	0	New
Partido Patria Libre	1,625	0.07	0	New
Alianza Alto Paraguay Alegre	1,597	0.07	0	New
Institutional Independent Movement	1,575	0.07	0	New
Workers' Party	1,338	0.06	0	0
Movimiento Propuesta por la Soberania Nacional	783	0.03	0	New
Moviemiento para el Pueblo Encarnacion	656	0.03	0	New
Liberal Party	579	0.03	0	New
Another Paraguay Movement	251	0.01	0	New
Workers' Regional Movement	189	0.01	0	New
Total	2,243,721	100.00	80	0
Valid votes	2,243,721	93.50		
Invalid/blank votes	155,905	6.50		
Total votes	2,399,626	100.00		
Registered voters/turnout	3,516,275	68.24		
Source: Supreme Electoral Justice Tribunal of Paraguay

==== Elected Deputies ====
Name	Political Party	Political Alliance	Department
Agustín Amado Florentín Cabral	Authentic Radical Liberal Party	Authentic Radical Liberal Party	Cordillera
Alsimio Casco Ayala	Colorado Party	Colorado Party	Concepción
Andrés Retamozo Ortiz	Colorado Party	Colorado Party	Alto Paraná
Antonio Gustavo Cardozo	Authentic Radical Liberal Party	Authentic Radical Liberal Party	Alto Paraná
Asa Javier González Ortiz	Authentic Radical Liberal Party	Authentic Radical Liberal Party	Misiones
Atilio Penayo Ortega	Colorado Party	Colorado Party	Central
Bernardo Villalba Cardozo	Colorado Party	Colorado Party	Concepción
Blanca Marina Vargas de Caballero	Colorado Party	Colorado Party	Alto Paraná
Carlos Alberto Núñez Salinas	Colorado Party	Colorado Party	Central
Carlos Antonio Portillo Verón	Authentic Radical Liberal Party	Authentic Radical Liberal Party	Alto Paraná
Carlos Manuel Maggi Rolón	Colorado Party	Colorado Party	San Pedro
Celso Kennedy Bogado	Authentic Radical Liberal Party	Authentic Radical Liberal Party	Caaguazú
Celso Maldonado Duarte	Authentic Radical Liberal Party	Authentic Radical Liberal Party	Central
Celso Troche Álvarez	Colorado Party	Colorado Party	Caazapá
César Ariel Oviedo Verdún	National Union of Ethical Citizens	National Union of Ethical Citizens	Central
Clemente Ramón Barrios Monges	Colorado Party	Colorado Party	Paraguarí
Concepción Quintana López	Colorado Party	Colorado Party	Alto Paraná
Cornelius Sawatzky Sawatzky	Colorado Party	Colorado Party	Boquerón
Cynthia Elizabeth Tarragó Díaz	Colorado Party	Colorado Party	Distrito Capital
Dany Edgar Xavier Durand Espínola	Colorado Party	Colorado Party	Distrito Capital
Del Pilar Eva Medina de Paredes	Colorado Party	Colorado Party	Central
Dionisio Oswaldo Amarilla Guirland	Authentic Radical Liberal Party	Authentic Radical Liberal Party	Central
Eber Osvaldo Ovelar Benítez	Colorado Party	Colorado Party	Caaguazú
Edgar Acosta Alcaráz	Authentic Radical Liberal Party	Authentic Radical Liberal Party	Central
Edgar Isaac Ortiz Riveros	Authentic Radical Liberal Party	Authentic Radical Liberal Party	Itapúa
Elio Cabral González	Colorado Party	Colorado Party	Alto Paraná
Enrique Antonio Concepción Buzarquis Cáceres	Authentic Radical Liberal Party	Authentic Radical Liberal Party	Caaguazú
Enrique Javier Pereira Thalmann	Colorado Party	Colorado Party	Central
Esmérita Sánchez de Da Silva	Authentic Radical Liberal Party	Authentic Radical Liberal Party	Caaguazú
Eusebio Alvarenga Martínez	Authentic Radical Liberal Party	Authentic Radical Liberal Party	Guairá
Fabiola Elvira Oviedo Melgarejo	National Union of Ethical Citizens	National Union of Ethical Citizens	Distrito Capital
Félix Fernando Ortellado Zorrilla	Colorado Party	Colorado Party	Guairá
Freddy Tadeo D’Ecclesiis Giménez	Colorado Party	Colorado Party	San Pedro
Héctor Lucio Lesme Delgado	Authentic Radical Liberal Party	Authentic Radical Liberal Party	Central
Hércules Pedro Lorenzo Alliana Rodríguez	Colorado Party	Colorado Party	Ñeembucú
Horacio Víctor Carísimo Ocampo	Authentic Radical Liberal Party	Authentic Radical Liberal Party	Itapúa
Hugo Adalberto Velázquez Moreno	Colorado Party	Colorado Party	Central
Hugo Leandro Rubín Godoy	National Encounter Party	National Encounter Party	Central
Jorge Ignacio Baruja Fernández	Colorado Party	Colorado Party	Paraguarí
Jorge Ramón Ávalos Mariño	Authentic Radical Liberal Party	Authentic Radical Liberal Party	Paraguarí
José Domingo Adorno Mazacotte	Colorado Party	Colorado Party	Alto Paraguay
José Gregorio Ledesma Narváez	Authentic Radical Liberal Party	Authentic Radical Liberal Party	San Pedro
José María Ibáñez Benítez	Colorado Party	Colorado Party	Central
Juan Bartolomé Ramírez Brizuela	Authentic Radical Liberal Party	Authentic Radical Liberal Party	Amambay
Julio Enrique Mineur de Witte	Authentic Radical Liberal Party	Chaqueña Passion Alliance	Presidente Hayes
Juan Félix Bogado Tatter	Authentic Radical Liberal Party	Authentic Radical Liberal Party	Distrito Capital
Julio Javier Ríos Bogado	Colorado Party	Colorado Party	Distrito Capital
Karina Andrea Rodríguez Carámbula	Movement for Socialism Party	Avanza País	Distrito Capital
Luis Alberto Larré del Puerto	Colorado Party	Colorado Party	Itapúa
Marcial Lezcano Paredes	Colorado Party	Colorado Party	Amambay
María Cristina Villalba López	Colorado Party	Colorado Party	Canindeyú
María Nimia Carísimo Sosa	Authentic Radical Liberal Party	Authentic Radical Liberal Party	Central
María Rocío Casco Arce	Movement for Socialism Party	Avanza País	Central
Mario Duilio Casco González	Colorado Party	Colorado Party	Itapúa
Mario Walberto Soto Estigarribia	Colorado Party	Colorado Party	Caaguazú
Miguel Ángel del Puerto Silva	Colorado Party	Colorado Party	Caaguazú
Miguel Tadeo Rojas Meza	Colorado Party	Colorado Party	Central
Mirta Ramona Mendoza Díaz	Authentic Radical Liberal Party	Authentic Radical Liberal Party	Concepción
Nazario Tomás Rojas Salvioni	Colorado Party	Colorado Party	Cordillera
Néstor Fabián Ferrer Miranda	Colorado Party	Colorado Party	Central
Olga Beatriz Ferreira de López	Beloved Fatherland Party	Beloved Fatherland Party	Distrito Capital
Olimpio Rojas Villalba	Authentic Radical Liberal Party	Authentic Radical Liberal Party	Caazapá
Óscar Luis Tuma Bogado	Colorado Party	Colorado Party	Distrito Capital
Óscar Venancio Núñez Giménez	Colorado Party	Colorado Party	Presidente Hayes
Pablino Acasio Rodríguez Aria	Colorado Party	Colorado Party	Misiones
Pastor Alberto Vera Bejarano	Authentic Radical Liberal Party	Authentic Radical Liberal Party	San Pedro
Pedro David Britos Espínola	Colorado Party	Colorado Party	Guairá
Pedro Milciades Duré Argüello	Authentic Radical Liberal Party	Authentic Radical Liberal Party	Cordillera
Perla Teresa Beatriz Acosta de Vázquez	Colorado Party	Colorado Party	San Pedro
Purificación Morel Alfonso	Colorado Party	Colorado Party	Canindeyú
Ramón Duarte Jiménez	Popular Unity Party	Guasú Front	Itapúa
Ramón Romero Roa	Colorado Party	Colorado Party	Alto Paraná
Ricardo González Escobar	National Encounter Party	National Encounter Party	Central
Salustiano Salinas Montanía	Authentic Radical Liberal Party	Authentic Radical Liberal Party	Central
Sergio Roberto Rojas Sosa	Authentic Radical Liberal Party	Authentic Radical Liberal Party	Central
Tomás Fidelino Rivas Benítez	Colorado Party	Colorado Party	Paraguarí
Víctor Luis González Segovia	Colorado Party	Colorado Party	Cordillera
Víctor Óscar González Drakeford	Authentic Radical Liberal Party	Authentic Radical Liberal Party	Alto Paraná
Víctor Ríos Ojeda	Authentic Radical Liberal Party	Authentic Radical Liberal Party	Ñeembucú
Walter Enrique Harms Céspedes	Colorado Party	Colorado Party	Itapúa

Source: Justicia Electoral

== Reactions ==
The defeated candidate Alegre conceded to Cartes a short time after preliminary results were announced. Argentine president Cristina Fernández de Kirchner congratulated the Paraguayan people, describing the election as "exemplary" and announced her endorsement of a re-admission of the country to the Mercosur community. José Mujica, the president of Uruguay, congratulated Cartes as well and invited him to the Mercosur summit that is to take place in his country in June. The European Union's high representative for foreign affairs, Catherine Ashton lauded the high turn-out, orderly and calm conduct of the election. Among the first felicitators was also Venezuelan president Nicolás Maduro.
