= Rocío Casco =

Paraguayan politician and women's rights activist

María Rocío Casco Arce is a Paraguayan politician and women's rights activist. A member of the Chamber of Deputies of Paraguay from 2013 to 2018, she introduced the bill concerning women's rights in domestic violence in 2016.

== Life ==
Before entering congress, Casco was a city councillor in Asunción. She is a member of the Movement to Socialism Party (Partido Movimiento al Socialismo, PMAS), which entered into a centre-left governing alliance in Paraguay under president Fernando Lugo. Following Lugo's impeachment and the installment of Federico Franco as president, Casco announced the formation of the Frente Nacional por la Defensa de la Democracia (National Front for the Defence of Democracy, FNDD), a coalition that considered the impeachment a "parliamentary coup" and rejected Franco's government.

In the 2013 Paraguayan general election PMAS joined the centre-left Avanza País political alliance, and Casco was elected to the Chamber of Deputies of Paraguay. She failed to achieve re-electionin the 2018 Paraguayan general election.

In 2020 she distanced herself from the financial dealings of Camilo Soares in financing Avanza País, calling Camilo "a scammer and a liar".

== Works ==
- 'The Paraguayan left and the challenges of the new government', in Birgit Daiber, ed., The Left in Government: Latin America and Europe Compared, Rosa Luxemburg Foundation, 2010, pp.95-103
