= 2018 Paraguayan general election =

- 22 April 2018
- Presidential election
- Turnout: 61.25% (▼7.27pp)
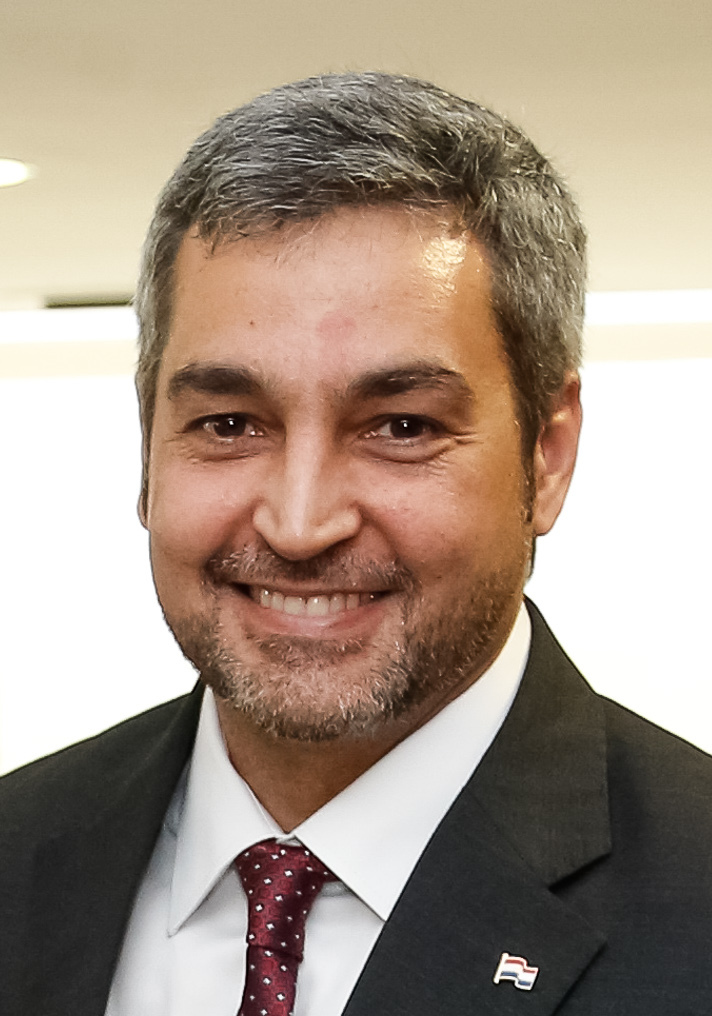

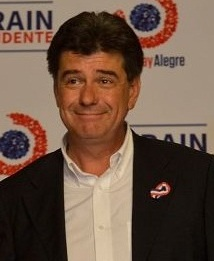
Candidate	Mario Abdo Benítez	Efraín Alegre
Party	Colorado	PLRA
Alliance	–	GANAR
Running mate	Hugo Velázquez	Leo Rubin
Popular vote	1,206,067	1,110,464
Percentage	48.96%	45.08%
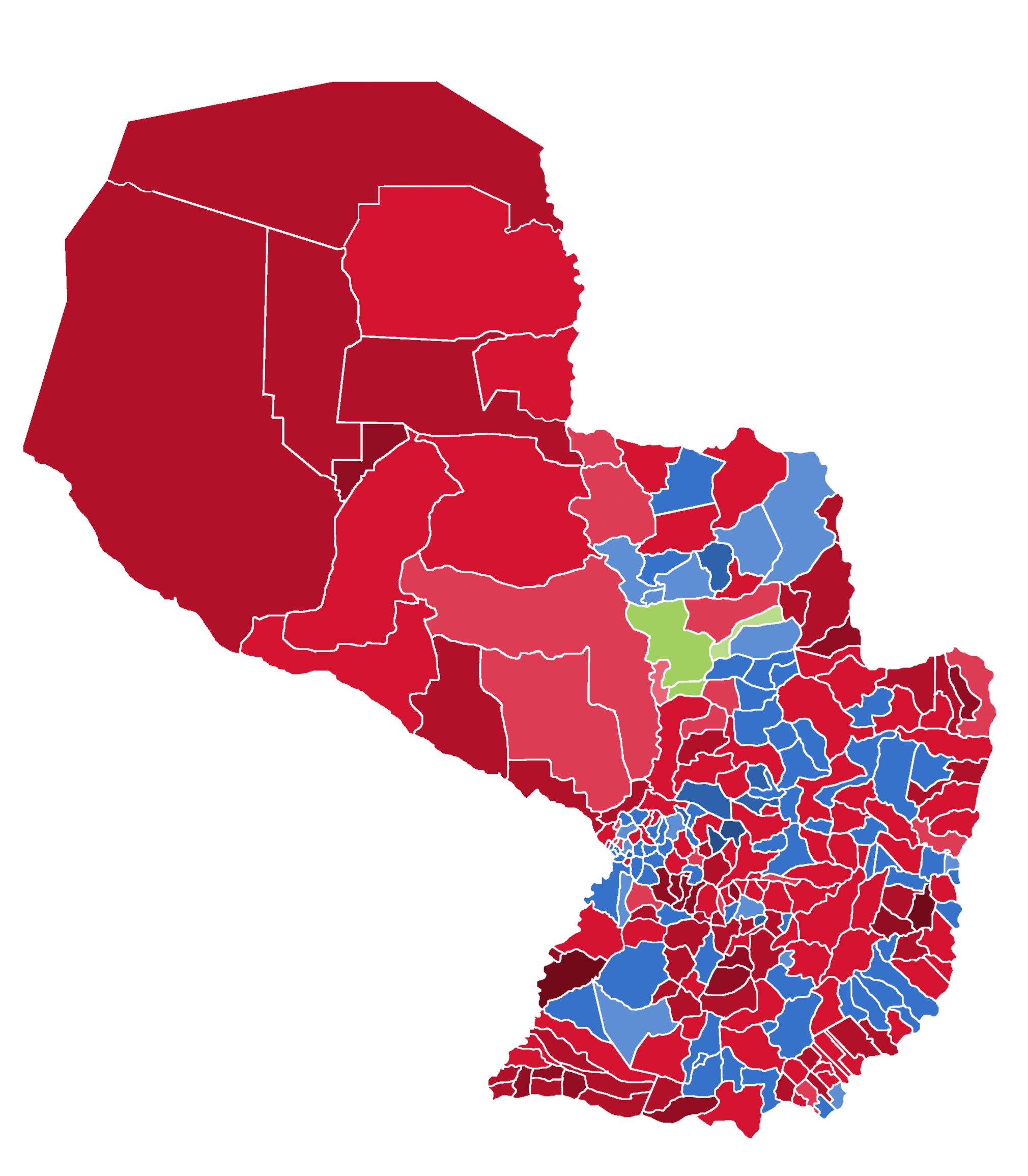
President before election
Horacio Cartes
Colorado
Elected President
Mario Abdo Benítez
Colorado
- Chamber of Deputies
- All 80 seats in the Chamber of Deputies; 41 seats needed for a majority
Party	Vote %	Seats	+/–
Colorado	39.10	42	−2
PLRA	17.74	17	−10
GANAR	12.08	13	New
PPQ	4.46	3	+2
Hagamos	3.19	2	New
PEN	3.18	2	0
MCN	1.41	1	New
This lists parties that won seats. See the complete results below.
- Senate
- All 45 seats in the Senate; 23 seats needed for a majority
Party	Vote %	Seats	+/–
Colorado	32.52	17	−2
PLRA	24.18	13	0
Guasú Front	11.83	6	+1
PPQ	6.77	3	+3
Hagamos	4.47	2	New
PDP	3.66	2	−1
MCN	2.48	1	New
UNACE	2.12	1	−1
This lists parties that won seats. See the complete results below.

General elections were held in Paraguay on 22 April 2018. President Horacio Cartes and Vice-President Juan Afara of the Colorado Party were not eligible for re-election. The presidential elections were won by the Colorado Party's Mario Abdo Benítez, who defeated Efraín Alegre of the GANAR alliance. The Colorado Party also won the most seats in the Senate and Chamber of Deputies. The new President and Vice-President took office on 15 August 2018 and left office in August 2023.

== Electoral system ==
The President of Paraguay is elected in one round of voting by plurality. The 80 members of the Chamber of Deputies are elected by closed list proportional representation in 18 multi-member constituencies based on the departments. The 45 members of the Senate are elected from a single national constituency using closed list proportional representation.

== Opinion polls ==
Polling firm	Date	Sample size	ANR-PC	GANAR	Other/None	Don't know/ No answer	Margin of error
ABC Color	6 April 2018	Unknown	51.9%	35.8%	–	–	–
La República	March 2018	1,300	42.2%	46.3%	3.5%	8.0%	–

== Results ==
=== President ===
Candidate	Party	Votes	%
Mario Abdo Benítez	Colorado Party	1,206,067	48.96
Efraín Alegre	Great Renewed National Alliance	1,110,464	45.08
Juan Bautista Ybáñez	Paraguay Green Party	84,045	3.41
Jaro Anzoátegui	National Artists' Movement	15,490	0.63
Atanasio Galeano	Popular Patriotic Movement Party	9,908	0.40
Ramón Ernesto Benítez	Patriotic Reserve Movement	9,361	0.38
Pedro Almada	Broad Front Party	8,590	0.35
Efraín Enríquez	National Sovereign Movement	7,291	0.30
Celino Ferreira	Movimiento Civico Nacional Unamonos	6,295	0.26
Justo Germán Ortega	Heirs Democratic Socialist Party	5,930	0.24
Total		2,463,441	100.00
Valid votes		2,463,441	94.82
Invalid votes		71,924	2.77
Blank votes		62,624	2.41
Total votes		2,597,989	100.00
Registered voters/turnout		4,241,507	61.25
Source: TSJE

=== Senate ===
Party	Votes	%	Seats	+/–
Colorado Party	766,841	32.52	17	–2
Authentic Radical Liberal Party	570,205	24.18	13	0
Guasú Front	279,008	11.83	6	+1
Beloved Fatherland Party	159,625	6.77	3	+3
Hagamos Party	105,375	4.47	2	New
Progressive Democratic Party	86,216	3.66	2	–1
National Crusade Movement	58,409	2.48	1	New
National Union of Ethical Citizens	49,889	2.12	1	–1
Green Party	37,812	1.60	0	0
We are Paraguay	34,623	1.47	0	New
National Encounter Party	30,365	1.29	0	–1
Plurinational Indigenous Political Movement	25,785	1.09	0	New
Christian Democratic Party	16,619	0.70	0	New
Secure Paraguay	15,005	0.64	0	New
Party of the Movement for Socialism	14,773	0.63	0	New
Patriotic Reserve Movement	14,397	0.61	0	New
Revolutionary Febrerista Party	14,332	0.61	0	0
Kuña Pyrenda Movement	9,795	0.42	0	0
Civic Compromise	9,542	0.40	0	New
Concertación Nacional Avancemos País	9,478	0.40	0	New
Party of the A	8,934	0.38	0	New
All for Paraguay United Movement	7,269	0.31	0	New
National Artists' Movement	6,775	0.29	0	New
Us	5,948	0.25	0	New
Heirs Democratic Socialist Party	5,275	0.22	0	New
National Political Sovereignty Movement	5,065	0.21	0	New
Movimiento Civico Nacional Unamonos	5,040	0.21	0	New
Broad Front Party	3,403	0.14	0	New
Union and Equality Political Movement	2,500	0.11	0	New
Total	2,358,303	100.00	45	0
Valid votes	2,358,303	91.11		
Invalid votes	92,716	3.58		
Blank votes	137,277	5.30		
Total votes	2,588,296	100.00		
Registered voters/turnout	4,241,507	61.02		
Source: TSJE

==== Elected Senators ====
Name	Party	Alliance
Agustín Amado Florentín Cabral	Authentic Radical Liberal Party	Authentic Radical Liberal Party
Antonio Carlos Barrios Fernández	Colorado Party	Colorado Party
Blanca Margarita Ovelar de Duarte	Colorado Party	Colorado Party
Blas Antonio Llano Ramos	Authentic Radical Liberal Party	Authentic Radical Liberal Party
Blas Lanzoni Achinelli	Authentic Radical Liberal Party	Authentic Radical Liberal Party
Carlos Alberto Filizzola Pallarés	Party for a Country of Solidarity	Guasú Front
Carlos Leopoldo Gómez Zelada Brugada	Authentic Radical Liberal Party	Authentic Radical Liberal Party
Derlis Ariel Alejandro Osorio Nunes	Colorado Party	Colorado Party
Desirée Graciela Masi Jara	Democratic Progressive Party	Democratic Progressive Party
Dionisio Oswaldo Amarilla Guirlland	Authentic Radical Liberal Party	Authentic Radical Liberal Party
Enrique Fausto Bacchetta Chiriani	Colorado Party	Colorado Party
Enrique Salyn Concepción Buzarquis Cáceres	Authentic Radical Liberal Party	Authentic Radical Liberal Party
Ernesto Javier Zacarías Irún	Colorado Party	Colorado Party
Esperanza Martínez de Portillo	Party of Citizen Participation	Guasú Front
Fernando Alberto Silva Facetti	Authentic Radical Liberal Party	Authentic Radical Liberal Party
Fernando Armindo Lugo Méndez	Independent	Guasú Front
Fidel Santiago Zavala Serrati	Beloved Fatherland Party	Beloved Fatherland Party
Georgia María Arrúa de Dolinsky	Beloved Fatherland Party	Beloved Fatherland Party
Gilberto Antonio Apuril Santiviago	Hagamos Political Party	Hagamos Political Party
Hermelinda Alvarenga de Ortega	Authentic Radical Liberal Party	Authentic Radical Liberal Party
Horacio Manuel Cartes Jara	Colorado Party	Colorado Party
Jorge Antonio Oviedo Matto	National Union of Ethical Citizens	National Union of Ethical Citizens
Jorge Osvaldo Querey Rojas	Party for a Country of Solidarity	Guasú Front
José Gregorio Ledesma Narváez	Authentic Radical Liberal Party	Authentic Radical Liberal Party
Juan Bartolomé Ramírez Brizuela	Authentic Radical Liberal Party	Authentic Radical Liberal Party
Juan Carlos Román Galaverna Delvalle	Colorado Party	Colorado Party
Juan Darío Monges Espínola	Colorado Party	Colorado Party
Juan Eudes Afara Maciel	Colorado Party	Colorado Party
Lilian Graciela Samaniego González	Colorado Party	Colorado Party
Luis Alberto Castiglioni Soria	Colorado Party	Colorado Party
María Eugenia Beatriz Bajac de Penner	Authentic Radical Liberal Party	Authentic Radical Liberal Party
Óscar Alberto González Daher	Colorado Party	Colorado Party
Óscar Hugo Richer Florentín	Popular Socialist Convergence Party	Guasú Front
Óscar Nicanor Duarte Frutos	Colorado Party	Colorado Party
Óscar Rubén Salomón Fernández	Colorado Party	Colorado Party
Paraguayo Antonio Cubas Colomés	National Crusade Movement	National Crusade Movement
Patrick Paul Kemper Thiede	Hagamos Political Party	Hagamos Political Party
Pedro Arthuro Santa Cruz Insaurralde	Democratic Progressive Party	Democratic Progressive Party
Sergio Daniel Godoy Codas	Colorado Party	Colorado Party
Silvio Adalberto Ovelar Benítez	Colorado Party	Colorado Party
Sixto Pereira Galeano	Tekojoja People's Party	Guasú Front
Stephan Rasmussen González	Beloved Fatherland Party	Beloved Fatherland Party
Víctor Alcides Bogado González	Colorado Party	Colorado Party
Víctor Ríos Ojeda	Authentic Radical Liberal Party	Authentic Radical Liberal Party
Zulma Ramona Gómez Cáceres	Authentic Radical Liberal Party	Authentic Radical Liberal Party

Source: ABC Color

=== Chamber of Deputies ===
Results by department

Party	Votes	%	Seats	+/–
Colorado Party	927,183	39.10	42	–2
Authentic Radical Liberal Party	420,821	17.74	17	–
Great Renewed National Alliance	286,513	12.08	13	–
Beloved Fatherland Party	105,765	4.46	3	+2
Hagamos Party	75,601	3.19	2	New
National Encounter Party	75,514	3.18	2	0
National Union of Ethical Citizens	65,593	2.77	0	–2
Guasú Front	42,891	1.81	0	–1
Green Party	42,053	1.77	0	0
National Crusade Movement	33,417	1.41	1	New
Progressive Democratic Party	27,932	1.18	0	0
Christian Democratic Party	26,783	1.13	0	New
Civic Compromise	21,651	0.91	0	New
Broad Front Party	20,594	0.87	0	New
We are Paraguay	18,060	0.76	0	New
Concertación Nacional Avancemos País	16,070	0.68	0	New
Revolutionary Febrerista Party	15,169	0.64	0	New
National Artists' Movement	11,727	0.49	0	New
Youth Party	10,871	0.46	0	0
Us	10,816	0.46	0	New
Secure Paraguay	9,651	0.41	0	New
Patriotic Reserve Movement	9,648	0.41	0	New
Civic Participation Party	9,567	0.40	0	New
Party of the A	9,043	0.38	0	New
Heirs Democratic Socialist Party	8,832	0.37	0	New
Itapua for All Alliance	8,683	0.37	0	New
Plurinational Indigenous Political Movement	8,094	0.34	0	New
Movimiento Civico Nacional Unamonos	7,241	0.31	0	New
Party of the Movement for Socialism	6,207	0.26	0	New
All for Paraguay United Movement	5,871	0.25	0	New
Ganar Alliance	5,476	0.23	0	–
Party of the Patriotic Popular Movement	5,147	0.22	0	New
National Political Sovereignty Movement	4,457	0.19	0	New
Let's Continue Building Alliance	4,183	0.18	0	New
Union and Equality Political Movement	3,775	0.16	0	New
Itapuense Front Alliance	3,036	0.13	0	New
Concertación por Vos	2,407	0.10	0	New
Party of Popular Unity	1,329	0.06	0	New
Tekojoja People's Movement	1,046	0.04	0	New
Movimiento Politico Civico Nacional Unamonos	949	0.04	0	New
All for Ñeembucu	772	0.03	0	New
Mbarete Independent Political Movement	595	0.03	0	New
Teete Patriotic Front Party	574	0.02	0	New
Total	2,371,607	100.00	80	0
Valid votes	2,371,607	91.84		
Invalid votes	78,457	3.04		
Blank votes	132,296	5.12		
Total votes	2,582,360	100.00		
Registered voters/turnout	4,241,507	60.88		
Source: TSJE

=== Departmental Governors ===
Department	Elected governor	Party	Votes	%
Concepción	Edgar Idalino López Ruíz	Liberal	43.881	49.78
San Pedro	Carlos Alcibiades Giménez Díaz	Colorado	56,493	39.66
Cordillera	Hugo Alberto Fleitas Ovelar	Liberal	58,998	45.10
Guairá	Juan Carlos Vera Báez	Colorado	50,115	58.26
Caaguazú	Alejo Rios Medina	GANAR	88,651	46.17
Caazapá	Pedro Alejandro Díaz Verón	Colorado	30.638	49.32
Itapúa	Juan Alberto Schmalko Palacios	Colorado	87,441	44.38
Misiones	Carlos María Arrechea Ortiz	Colorado	29,364	48.28
Paraguarí	Juan Carlos Baruja Fernandez	Colorado	49,416	46.10
Alto Paraná	Roberto Luis González Vaesken	Colorado	104,539	37.47
Central	Hugo Javier González Alegre	Colorado	314,314	43.99
Ñeembucú	Luis Federico Benitez Cuevas	Colorado	20,881	47.89
Amambay	Ronald Enrique Acevedo Quevedo	Liberal	31,119	47.95
Canindeyú	César Ramírez Caje	Colorado	36,516	53.16
Presidente Hayes	Rubén Antonio Roussillon Blaires	Colorado	13,710	32.37
Alto Paraguay	José Domingo Adorno Mazacotte	Colorado	3,910	50.16
Boquerón	Dario Rafael Medina Velázquez	Colorado	9,051	49.40
