= Chaqueña Passion Alliance =

Political alliance in Paraguay

The Chaqueña Passion Alliance (Spanish: Alianza Pasión Chaqueña) is a political alliance in Paraguay.

== History ==
The alliance was formed for the 2013 general elections. Led by the National Encounter Party, it also included the Authentic Radical Liberal Party, the Beloved Fatherland Party and the Democratic Progressive Party.

The alliance won a single seat in the Chamber of Deputies, taken by Julio Mineur.
