= 1991 Paraguayan Constitutional Assembly election =

- 1 December 1991
- All 198 seats in the Constitutional Assembly; 100 seats needed for a majority
Party	Vote %	Seats
Colorado Party	55.1	122
Authentic Radical Liberal Party	27.0	55
Constitution for All	11.0	19
Revolutionary Febrerista Party	1.2	1
Christian Democratic Party	0.9	1
This lists parties that won seats. See the complete results below.

Constitutional Assembly elections were held in Paraguay on 1 December 1991. The result was a victory for the Colorado Party, which won 122 of the 198 seats. Voter turnout was 51.7%.

Following the elections, a new constitution was promulgated in 1992. It reintroduced the position of Vice President and allowed for the President to be elected by a plurality of the vote. It also limited the President to a single five-year term, with no possibility of re-election even if the incumbent had only served a partial term. This provision meant that incumbent Andrés Rodríguez would have had to leave office in 1993 even without his promise to not run for a full term.

== Electoral system ==
The 198 members of the Constituent Assembly were elected by closed list proportional representation with seats allocated using the D'Hondt method at two levels:

- 140 members from a national list
- 58 members from 16 multi-member constituencies of between two and nine seats corresponding to the Departments of Paraguay (except for the three Departments of the Chaco region, which were grouped into one district) and the Capital District

== Results ==
Party	Votes	%	Seats
Colorado Party	409,730	55.1	122
Authentic Radical Liberal Party	201,040	27.0	55
Constitution for All	81,860	11.0	19
Revolutionary Febrerista Party	9,094	1.2	1
Christian Democratic Party	6,548	0.9	1
Workers' Party		0.6	0
Paraguayan Humanist Party		0.5	0
People, Nation and Solidarity		0.1	0
Total			198
Total votes	743,546	–	
Registered voters/turnout	1,438,543	51.69	
Source: Nohlen, TSJE
