= Paraguayan Humanist Party =

Political party in Paraguay

- President: Gabriela Schvartzman
- Founded: 1985
- Dissolved: 2017
- Headquarters: Asunción
- Ideology: Humanism
- Political position: Left-wing
- International affiliation: Humanist International

The Paraguayan Humanist Party (Spanish: Partido Humanista Paraguayo, PHP) was a political party in Paraguay.

== History ==
The party was established in 1985, but was not legalised until the overthrow of the Stroessner regime in 1989. In the elections that year it received just 0.1% of the national vote and failed to win a seat. In the 1991 Constitutional Assembly elections its vote share rose to 0.5%, but it failed to win a seat again. For the 1993 elections the party ran in an alliance with the Christian Democratic Party named the Social Democratic Coalition, but remained seatless. It did not contest the 1998 elections, but entered a candidate (Ricardo Buman) in the vice presidential election in 2000. Buman finished third out of three candidates with just 1.5% of the vote. In the 2003 general elections the party won 0.2% of the vote in the Congressional elections, remaining seatless.

In 2008 the party formed a coalition with several other small leftist parties to create the Patriotic Alliance for Change. In the 2008 general elections the coalition received 10% of the vote and won four seats in the Chamber of Deputies and one seat in the Senate. The party's leader, Fernando Lugo, was elected President of Paraguay in the same elections. However, Lugo was impeached and removed from office in 2012, which led to the party's decline in popularity. In the 2013 general elections the party received only 3% of the vote and failed to win a seat. Since then, the party has struggled to regain its former political influence and has not won any seats in subsequent elections.
