= Lilian Samaniego =

Paraguayan politician

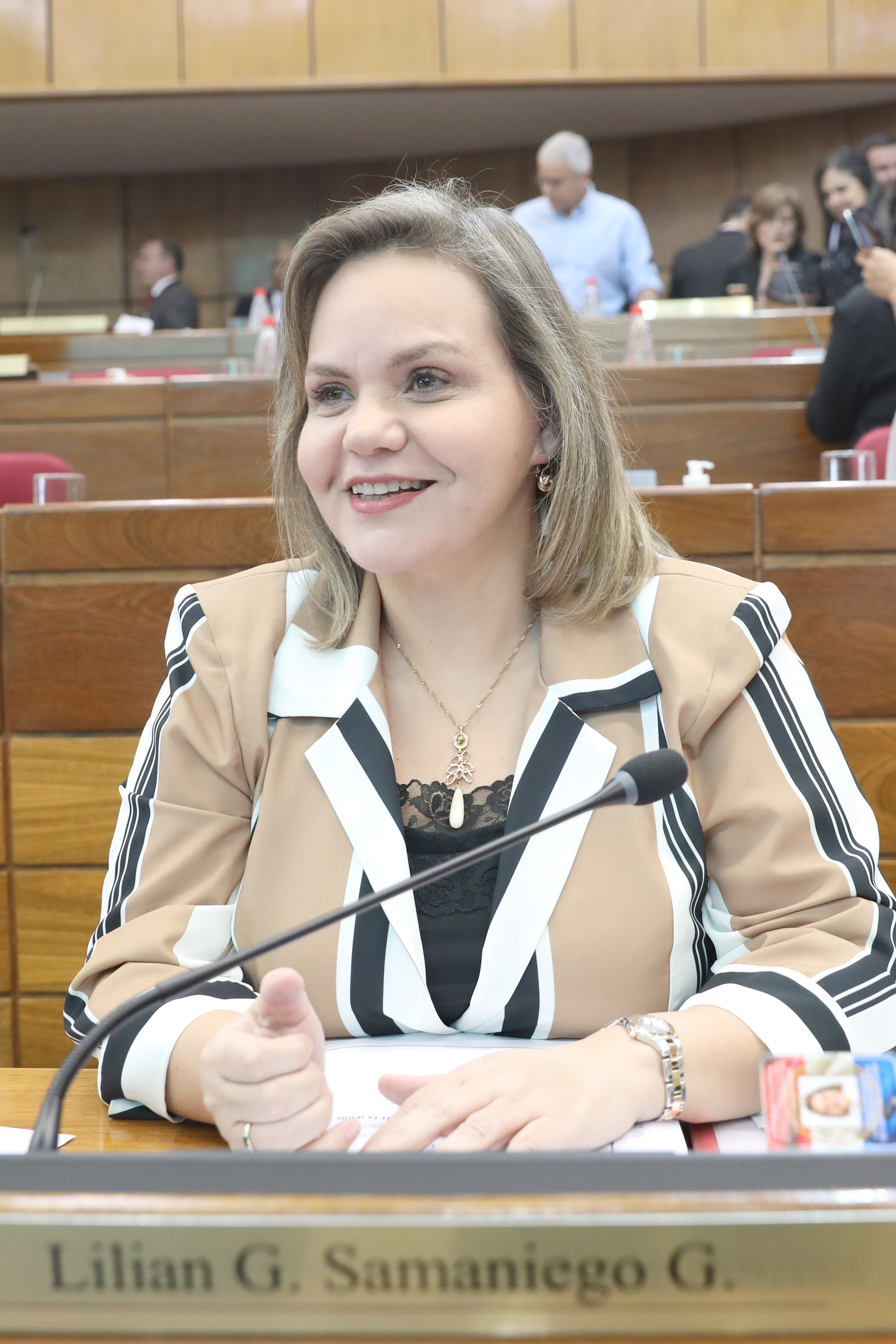
- Samaniego in 2019

Senator of Paraguay
- Incumbent
- Assumed office 16 November 2004

President of the Colorado Party
- In office 19 November 2008 – 25 July 2015
- Preceded by: José Alberto Alderete
- Succeeded by: Pedro Alliana

Personal details
- Born: Lilian Graciela Samaniego González; 25 February 1965 (age 61) Asunción, Paraguay
- Party: Colorado Party
- Relatives: Arnaldo Samaniego (brother)
- Education: Universidad Nacional de Asunción
- Occupation: Pharmaceutical chemist; politician

Lilian Graciela Samaniego González (born 25 February 1965) is a Paraguayan pharmaceutical chemist and politician. A member of the Colorado Party, she has been a member of the Senate for Asunción since 2004. She was president of the Colorado Party from 2008 to 2015, the first woman to hold the role.

== Biography ==
Lilian Samaniego was born on 25 February 1965, in San Vicente, a neighborhood of Asunción, to parents Ignacio E. Samaniego and Elisa González de Samaniego, recognized leaders of the ANR. She has two brothers – Arnaldo, who was mayor of Asunción from 2010 to 2015, and Gustavo.

She completed her primary and secondary studies at the Cristo Rey de Asunción School, from which she graduated as a Bachelor of Science and Letters in 1983.

She entered the Universidad Nacional de Asunción, and in 1987 she graduated from the Faculty of Chemical Sciences with the degree of pharmaceutical chemist.

She completed postgraduate studies in the United States, Europe, and the Mercosur countries.

== Pharmaceutical theft case ==
On 14 July 1998, while Samaniego was working as head of the healthcare campus of the Social Security Institute (IPS), police arrested several people in connection with a cache of prescription medications seized in Asunción. These were marked "exclusive use of IPS" and valued at approximately 800 million guaraní (US$290,000). Samaniego was investigated as a possible conspirator, and lost her position, but charges against her were later dropped. About one year later, she was re-appointed as head of the pharmaceutical unit by IPS chief Darío Filártiga, who was also a political advisor to Horacio Cartes.

== Political career ==
Lilian Samaniego joined the Colorado Party on 24 March 1982, where she was very active, holding various positions as a delegate, proxy, political secretary of the governing board, and president of the women's central commission.

She has been part of some of the party's internal movements, such as the United Colorado Movement, the Republican Participation Movement, and the Colorado Vanguard Movement. She was expelled from the latter in 2008 due to dissatisfaction with a deal she had reached with former President Nicanor Duarte.

=== President of the ANR-PC ===
Samaniego was elected first vice president of the ANR by more than two thirds of the governing board, and immediately assumed the interim presidency of the party on 16 September 2008. She took over in the midst of an internal crisis, after a major loss in that year's general election, where opposition candidate Fernando Lugo triumphed and ended more than 60 years of Colorado governments. She led her party to a resurgence in the 2010 municipal elections, leaving it well positioned to return to power in 2013 with the election of Horacio Cartes.

She was ratified in her position as president in the internal elections of 13 March 2011, becoming the first woman to be elected to the position in the party's 124-year history.

=== Senator ===
Samaniego was elected as alternate senator for Asunción in 2003, and took over as titular senator in 2004. She was reelected in 2008, 2013, and 2018. She is president of the body's Equity and Gender Commission. As Senator, she was one of the main promoters in Congress of a constitutional amendment that would have allowed the President of Paraguay to run for reelection, which was seen as done at the behest of then-President Horacio Cartes, which led to the 2017 Paraguayan crisis.

== Personal life ==
In November 2026, she was in a motorcycle accident in Asunción on a Costanera. Her family confirmed she was not in danger.
