= Avanza País (Paraguay) =

- Founded: 2013
- Political position: Centre-left to left-wing
- Chamber of Deputies: 2 / 80
- Senate: 2 / 45

Avanza País (lit. Forward Country) is a centre-left political alliance in Paraguay.

== History ==
The alliance was formed for the 2013 general elections as a breakaway from the Guasú Front, and consisted of the Revolutionary Febrerista Party, the Movement for Socialism, the Christian Democratic Party, the Tekopyahú Paraguay Party, the 20 April Movement and Democratic Unity for Victory.

It put forward television host Mario Ferreiro as its candidate for president, with Ferreiro finishing in third place. The alliance won two seats in the Chamber of Deputies and two in the Senate.
