= Contessi =

Contessi is an Italian surname. Notable people with the surname include:

- Luigi Contessi (1894–1967), Italian gymnast
- Pablo Contessi (died 2016), Paraguayan doctor and politician
