= Avanza País =

Avanza País may refer to:

- Go on Country, a Peruvian political party
- Avanza País, a Paraguayan political alliance
