= Lino César Oviedo Sánchez =

Paraguayan politician

Lino César Oviedo Sánchez is a Paraguayan politician. He is a member of the Senate of Paraguay for the National Union of Ethical Citizens (UNACE) since 2008. He is the nephew of Lino César Oviedo Silva, usually known as Lino Oviedo; the elder Oviedo was the former leader of UNACE, and a divisive political figure in Paraguay.

Oviedo Sánchez became the presidential candidate of UNACE in the April 2013 elections when his uncle Oviedo Silva was killed in a helicopter accident on 2 February 2013. He ended up receiving only 0.8% of the vote.
