= Aníbal Carrillo =

Paraguayan politician

Personal details
- Political party: Frente Guasú

Aníbal Carrillo Iramain is a Paraguayan politician who was the presidential candidate of the Frente Guasú in the April 2013 elections. Frente Guasú is a left-wing coalition led by the previous election's winner and impeached president Fernando Lugo. Carrillo obtained 3.32% of the vote.
