= Authentic Radical Liberal Party =

Political party in Paraguay

Authentic Radical Liberal Party Partido Liberal Radical Auténtico
- Abbreviation: PLRA
- President: Alcides Riveros
- Founded: 23 September 1977; 49 years ago
- Split from: Radical Liberal Party
- Headquarters: Iturbe 936 c/ Manuel Domínguez, Asunción
- Youth wing: Authentic Radical Liberal Youth
- Membership (2022): 1,548,023
- Ideology: Liberalism; Progressivism
- Political position: Centre to centre-left
- National affiliation: Concertación
- International affiliation: Liberal International
- Chamber of Deputies: 22 / 80
- Senate: 7 / 45
- Governors: 2 / 17

Party flag

Website
- www.plra.org.py

The Authentic Radical Liberal Party (Spanish: Partido Liberal Radical Auténtico or PLRA) is a liberal and radical political party in Paraguay. The party is a full member of Liberal International. The liberales, as they are known, are the leading opposition to the dominant conservative National Republican Association – Colorado Party (ANR-PC). They have taken this position since the end of the Alfredo Stroessner dictatorship in 1989. They are the political successors of the Liberal Party, which traces its history back to 10 July 1887.

The party was formed by Domingo Laíno, Carmen Casco de Lara Castro, Carlos Alberto González, Miguel Ángel Martínez Yaryes, and others on 23 September 1977, in opposition to the Constitutional Amendment of 1977 which imposed no term limits to the re-election of the Paraguayan president. The PLRA remained officially unrecognized from its foundation in 1978 until the overthrow of Alfredo Stroessner. During this time, PLRA activists suffered continual harassment.

In the presidential elections of 2008, the party achieved victory over the Colorado Party for the first time in 61 years through a political alliance headed by leftist Fernando Lugo and composed by other left-wing political parties. At the 2008 legislative elections, the party won 26 seats in the Chamber of Deputies and 14 seats in the Senate. They were approximately tied with the Colorados in the number of seats won in the Chamber of Deputies and the Senate.

Following the June 2012 impeachment of Fernando Lugo, which the PLRA spearheaded, the governing alliance fell apart, and Vice-President Federico Franco took over the presidency, thus exercising the first all-PLRA government in Paraguay. The PLRA has remained in opposition since 2013. As one of Paraguay’s two traditional parties, the PLRA is notable for its lack of a clear political program, which is a reflection of its division into personalist factions, dominated by networks of national and local caudillos.

== Electoral history ==
=== Presidential elections ===
Election	Party candidate	Votes	%	Result
1989	Domingo Laíno	241,829	20.98%	Lost ✗
1993	Domingo Laíno	357,164	33.20%	Lost ✗
1998^{[a]}	Domingo Laíno	703,379	43.88%	Lost ✗
2003	Julio César Franco	370,348	24.7%	Lost ✗
2008^{[b]}	Supported Fernando Lugo (PDC)	766,502	42.40%	Elected ✓
2013^{[c]}	Efraín Alegre	889,451	39.05%	Lost ✗
2018^{[d]}	Efraín Alegre	1,110,464	45.08%	Lost ✗
2023^{[e]}	Efraín Alegre	830,842	28.25%	Lost ✗

=== Vice presidential election ===
Election	Party candidate	Votes	%	Result
2000	Julio César Franco	597,431	49.6%	Elected ✓

=== Chamber of Deputies elections ===
Election	Votes	%	Seats	+/–
1989	229,329	20.2%	21 / 72	▲21
1993	414,208	36.8%	33 / 80	▲12
1998^{[a]}	681,917	42.8%	35 / 80	▼7
2003	379,066	25.7%	21 / 80	▼14
2008	500,040	28.27%	27 / 80	▲6
2013	656,301	29.25%	27 / 80	Steady
2018	420,821	17.74%	17 / 80	▼10
2023 (Note: Run as part of the National Coalition for a New Paraguay.)	779,282	27.46%	23 / 80	▲6

=== Senate elections ===
Election	Votes	%	Seats	+/–
1993	409,728	36.2%	17 / 45	▲17
1998^{[a]}	661,764	42.1%	20 / 45	▼5
2003	374,854	25.4%	12 / 45	▼8
2008	507,413	28.92%	14 / 45	▲2
2013	588,054	26.17%	13 / 45	▼1
2018	570,205	24.18%	13 / 45	Steady
2023	701,547	24.35%	12 / 45	▼1

==== Notes ====
^{a} PLRA contested the 1998 elections as a member of the Democratic Alliance electoral coalition along with the National Encounter Party.

^{b} PLRA contested the 2008 elections as a member of the Patriotic Alliance for Change electoral coalition along with the Febrerista Revolutionary Party, the National Encounter Party, the Party for a Country of Solidarity, the Christian Democratic Party, and the Progressive Democratic Party, among others.

^{c} PLRA contested the 2013 elections as a member of the Paraguay Alegre electoral coalition along with the Progressive Democratic Party and the National Encounter Party, among others.

^{d} PLRA contested the 2018 elections as a member of the Great Renewed National Alliance electoral coalition along with the Revolutionary Febrerista Party, the Progressive Democratic Party, and the Guasú Front, among others.

^{e} PLRA contested the 2023 elections as a member of the Concertación electoral coalition along with the Guasú Front, the Beloved Fatherland Party, the National Encounter Party, the Hagamos Party, the Progressive Democratic Party, the Revolutionary Febrerista Party, and the Christian Democratic Party, among others.

== See also ==
- List of liberal parties
- Liberal democracy
- Liberalism and radicalism in Paraguay
- List of polítical parties in Paraguay
