= National Union of Ethical Citizens =

Political party in Paraguay

National Union of Ethical Citizens Unión Nacional de Ciudadanos Éticos
- President: Jorge Oviedo Matto
- Founder: Lino Oviedo
- Founded: September 17, 2002; 24 years ago
- Split from: Colorado Party
- Headquarters: San Lorenzo
- Ideology: Nationalism; Conservatism; Right-wing populism
- Political position: Right-wing to far-right
- Chamber of Deputies: 0 / 80
- Senate: 0 / 45

Website
- www.unace.org.py

The National Union of Ethical Citizens (Spanish: Unión Nacional de Ciudadanos Éticos, UNACE) is a right-wing populist political party in Paraguay.

== History ==
The party was established in 2002, although its predecessor, the Unión Nacional de Colorados Éticos, was founded in 1996 as a faction within the ruling Colorado party. It first contested national elections in 2003, when it won 10 seats in the Chamber of Deputies and seven in the Senate, becoming the joint-third largest party. Its candidate in the presidential election, Guillermo Sánchez, finished fourth with 13.9% of the vote.

In January 2008, Lino Oviedo, who was released from prison in September 2007, was nominated unopposed as the party's presidential candidate for the April elections. In the elections the party won 15 seats in the Chamber and nine in the Senate, whilst Oviedo finished third with 22.8% of the vote.

== Electoral history ==
=== Presidential elections ===
Election	Party candidate	Votes	%	Result
2003	Guillermo Sánchez Guffanti	208,391	13.90%	Lost ✗
2008	Lino Oviedo	411,034	22.74%	Lost ✗
2013	Lino César Oviedo Sánchez	19,416	0.85%	Lost ✗

=== Chamber of Deputies elections ===
Election	Votes	%	Seats	+/–
2003	216,803	14.7%	10 / 80	▲10
2008	330,754	18.70%	15 / 80	▲5
2013	147,534	6.58%	2 / 80	▼13
2018	65,593	2.77%	0 / 80	▼2

=== Senate elections ===
Election	Votes	%	Seats	+/–
2003	211,078	14.3%	7 / 45	▲7
2008	336,763	19.20%	9 / 45	▲2
2013	90,640	4.03%	2 / 45	▼7
2018	49,889	2.12%	1 / 45	▼1
