= Pablo Contessi =

Paraguayan doctor and politician

Pablo "Chiqui" Contessi Pérez (? – January 23, 2016) was a Paraguayan doctor and politician. He served as the governor of Presidente Hayes Department from 2013 until his death in office on January 23, 2016.

Contessi left the Colorado Party (ANR) in 2013. A surgeon by profession, Contessi was elected Governor of Presidente Hayes Department on April 21, 2013, as a member of the Chaqueña Passion Alliance.

Governor Contessi was killed in a car accident on January 23, 2016. The van in which Contessi was traveling in overturned in the accident. The accident took place in the village of Buzarquis, which is located between Joel Estigarribia and Neuland Colony, in neighboring Boquerón department in the Chaco. He was survived by his wife, Doña Celeste Picco.

Contessi was buried in a cemetery in Villa Hayes, the capital of Presidente Hayes. The departmental government declared three days of mourning.
