= Ramón Romero Roa =

Paraguayan politician (1966–2021)

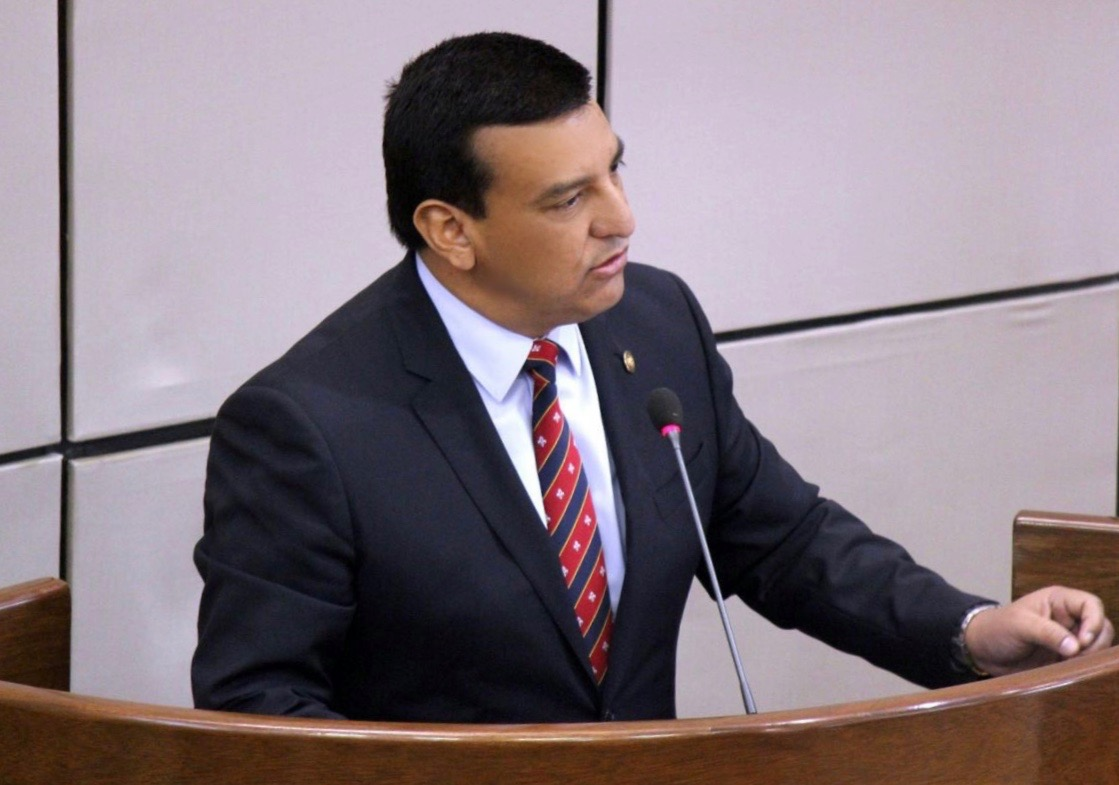
Romero Roa in 2016

Ramón Romero Roa (3 April 1966 – 23 June 2021) was a Paraguayan politician.

== Biography ==
He was born in Minga Guazú, and served as a member of the Chamber of Deputies of Paraguay from 2013 till his death from COVID-19 on 23 June 2021 in Asunción during the COVID-19 pandemic in Paraguay.
