= Mario Ferreiro =

Paraguayan television host and politician

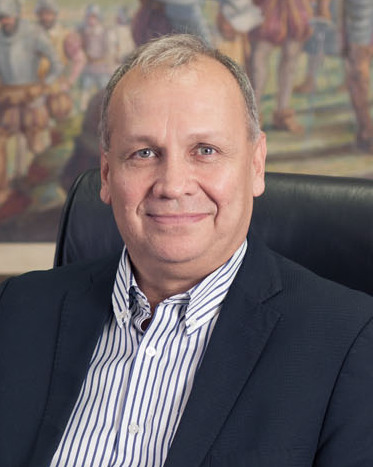
- Ferreiro in 2015

Mayor of Asunción
- In office December 19, 2015 – December 20, 2019
- Preceded by: Arnaldo Samaniego
- Succeeded by: Óscar Rodríguez

Personal details
- Born: May 30, 1959 (age 67) Asunción, Paraguay
- Party: Avanza País
- Education: Universidad Nacional de Asunción

Mario Aníbal Ferreiro Sanabria (born May 30, 1959) is a Paraguayan television host and politician. He was the presidential candidate of the centre-left coalition Avanza País in the April 2013 elections and received 5.88% of the vote.

He was intendant of City of Asunción, capital of Paraguay, from 2015 to 2019.

His parents were Revolutionary Febrerista Party members. He studied at the Universidad Nacional de Asunción and also in the United States. He became a radio and newspaper journalist in 1979 and a television host in 1980. He has hosted TV programs on SNT such as La mañana de cada día (2003–2012) and 24 Horas. He has also published several books of short stories and jokes.
