= Enzo Cardozo Jiménez =

Paraguayan politician

Enzo Cardozo Jimenez is the Paraguayan Minister of Agriculture and Livestock under President Fernando Lugo.

In 2015, corruption charges were filed against Jimenez. In 2022, Jimenez was convicted of fraud and breach of trust. In 2025, Jimenez's conviction was upheld and he was transferred to prison to serve a ten year sentence.
