= Impeachment of Fernando Lugo =

2012 removal of Paraguayan President Fernando Lugo by the Congress of Paraguay

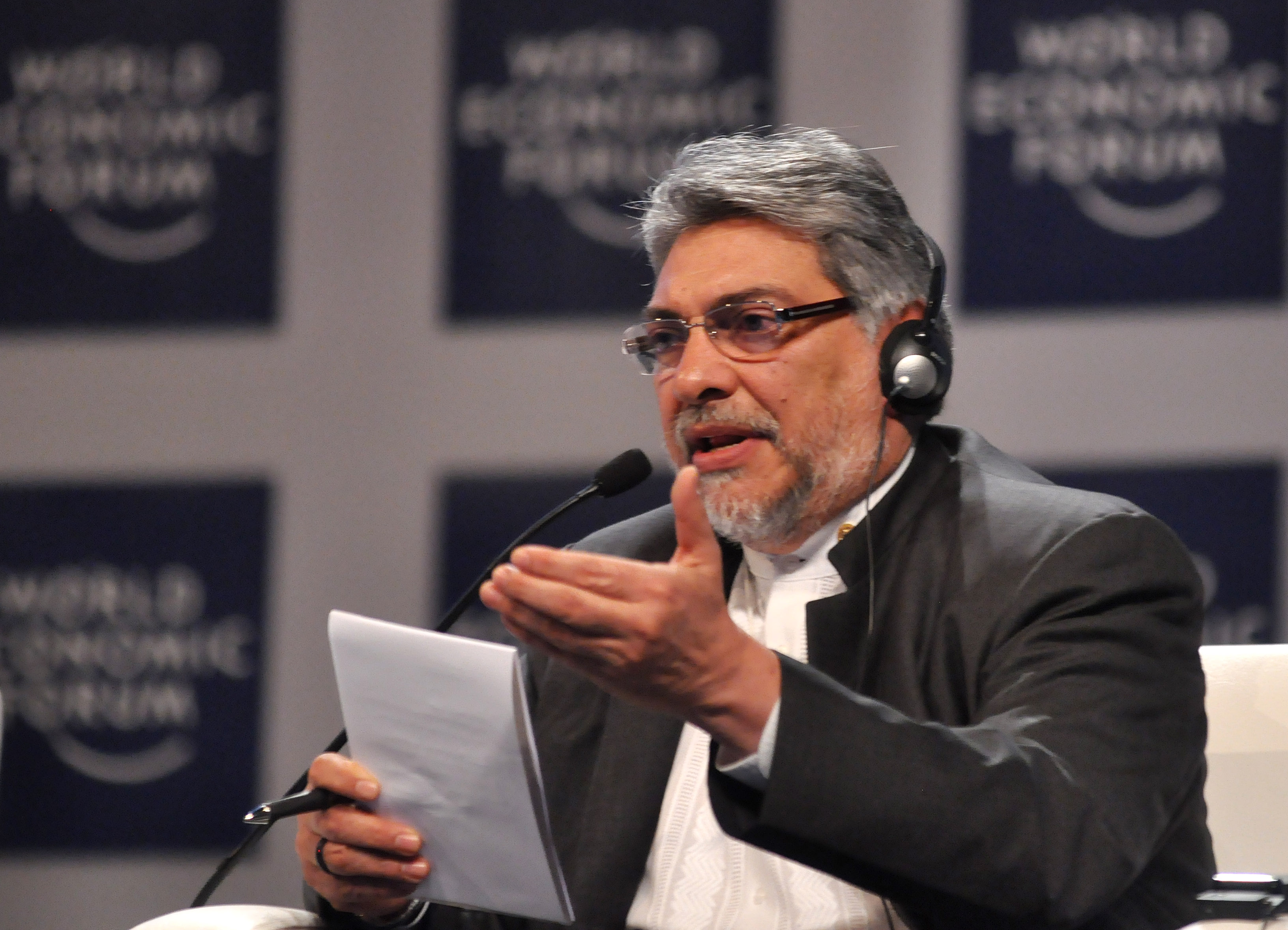
- Fernando Lugo in 2010
- Accused: Fernando Lugo, 48th President of Paraguay
- Date: 21–22 June 2012
- Outcome: No impeachment trial held: President Lugo found guilty of violating the constitution of Paraguay and immediately removed from office; Vice President Federico Franco becomes president for the remainder of Lugo's term; New presidential election held in April 2013

Congressional votes

Voting in the Chamber of Deputies (21 June 2012)
- Accusation: Resolution to impeach
- Votes in favor: 76 / 80 (95%)
- Votes against: 1 / 80 (1%)
- Result: Resolution approved

Voting in the Senate (22 June 2012)
- Accusation: Resolution to convict
- Votes in favor: 39 / 45 (87%)
- Votes against: 4 / 45 (9%)
- Result: Lugo convicted

Fernando Lugo, elected President of Paraguay in 2008, was impeached and removed from office by the Congress of Paraguay in June 2012. On 21 June the Chamber of Deputies voted 76 to 1 to impeach Lugo, and the Senate removed him from office the following day, by 39 votes to 4, resulting in Vice President Federico Franco, who had broken with Lugo, becoming President. Lugo contends he was denied due process because he did not have enough time to prepare a defense. A number of Latin American governments declared the proceeding was effectively a coup d'état. Lugo himself formally accepted the impeachment, but called it a "parliamentary coup".

== Background ==
The election of Lugo to the presidency in 2008 broke a 61-year period in office for the Colorado Party (ANR-PC). Lugo was aided by the presence of Federico Franco of the traditional opposition Authentic Radical Liberal Party (PLRA) on the ticket as its vice presidential candidate. Lugo's electoral coalition, the Patriotic Alliance for Change (APC), was able to elect him as President (gaining 42.3% of the vote, against the second-placed Colorado candidate's 31.8%). However the Liberals and Colorados retained a majority of both houses of Congress. The Liberal Party, initially a member of the Alliance, withdrew in 2009, leaving the Alliance with just a handful of Congressional seats.

In mid-May 2012 around 150 landless farmers occupied the Campos Morombi belonging to ex-Colorado Senator Blas Riquelme. The farmers said the land, in Curuguaty in the eastern Canindeyú Department, had been taken illegally during the dictatorship of Alfredo Stroessner. On 15 June 2012 a police operation to evict landless farmers, enforcing a court order obtained by Riquelme, led to the death of 6 police officers and 11 farmers. The eviction involved over 300 police evicting over 150 farmers; according to the BBC, "the eviction escalated into violence and the farmers opened fire on the police." The GEO chief and deputy had approached the farmers for dialogue without arms drawn, not expecting violence, and were both shot in the head. Some suspected the involvement of the Paraguayan People’s Army. On 16 June Lugo accepted the resignation of his interior minister Carlos Filizzola and of National Police chief General Paulino Rojas. On 16 June former National General Counsel Rubén Candia Amarilla, a controversial figure from the Colorado Party, took over the Ministry of Interior. Immediately, the PLRA (Partido Liberal Radical Auténtico, or Authentic Radical Liberal party) requested the dismissal of Candia Amarilla and the new National Police chief Arnaldo Sanabria, who led the police operation that ended in the deaths of the farmers in Curuguaty. On 19 June "Emilio Camacho, auditor of the Paraguayan Land Institute (INDERT), confirmed that Blas Riquelme did not have the title to the 2,000 hectares." On 20 June Lugo announced a special commission to investigate the incident.

== Impeachment ==
On 21 June, the Chamber of Deputies launched proceedings to impeach Lugo under Article 225 of the Constitution of Paraguay.

The Chamber cited the 15 June incident as well as insecurity, nepotism and a controversial land purchase to vote 76 to 1 to impeach Lugo on 21 June 2012. The Senate took up the case the next day. The impeachment was attended by a delegation of Foreign Affairs ministers from the other nations of the Union of South American Nations. The vote ended with 39 votes for Lugo's removal and four for his continuity, which removed Lugo from office and made Vice President Federico Franco (who had broken with Lugo earlier) the new president of Paraguay. Lugo announced that he would denounce the case to the Inter-American Court of Human Rights, stating that the time to prepare a legal defence, just two hours, may be unconstitutional.

The impeachment was endorsed by the Supreme Court of Paraguay and by the country's electoral court on 25 June. The next day, Lugo stated that while he still believed his impeachment amounted to a coup, nothing short of a "miraculous" reversal of course by Congress would allow him to regain office. Short of that, he said, "all my legal possibilities ended yesterday ... Legally there is no other way to reverse this situation." The electoral court declared that Lugo had been duly removed from office under Article 225, and that Federico Franco had correctly succeeded as President under Article 234.

=== Voting result in the Congress of Paraguay ===
Chamber of Deputies vote on initiating impeachment proceedings against President Fernando Lugo.
| Ballot | 21 June 2012 |
|---|---|
| Required majority | 54 out of 80 (67.50%) |
| Yes | 76 / 80 |
| No | 1 / 80 |
| Abstentions | 0 / 80 |
| Absentees | 3 / 80 |

Chamber of Senators vote on removing President Fernando Lugo from office.
| Ballot | 22 June 2012 |
|---|---|
| Required majority | 30 out of 45 (66.67%) |
| Yes | 39 / 45 |
| No | 4 / 45 |
| Abstentions | 0 / 130 |
| Absentees | 2 / 45 |

== Reactions ==
The presidents of Paraguay's neighbouring countries rejected Lugo's removal from office, and compared it to a coup d'état. Brazilian president Dilma Rousseff proposed suspending Paraguay's membership in Mercosur and the Union of South American Nations. Cristina Fernández de Kirchner of Argentina, Evo Morales of Bolivia, Rafael Correa of Ecuador and Leonel Fernández of the Dominican Republic announced that they would not recognize Franco as president. Condemnation also came from more rightist governments in the region, such as Mexico, Colombia and Chile. Lugo's removal drew comparisons to the ousting of Honduras's Manuel Zelaya in 2009; like the ousting of Lugo, it was defended as legal and constitutional while being denounced as unethical, having ulterior motives, and a coup across the Western Hemisphere's political spectrum.

Bolivarian Alliance for the Americas (ALBA) countries issued a joint statement condemning the events as a coup, and a number of countries (ALBA members Bolivia, Cuba, Venezuela and Ecuador, as well as non-members Brazil, Argentina, Chile, Colombia, Peru, Mexico) withdrew their ambassadors to Paraguay. Mercosur suspended Paraguay, and Ecuador has said it may invoke UNASUR's democratic clause, which could lead to the expulsion of Paraguay from both bodies.

The Inter-American Commission on Human Rights issued a statement on 23 June declaring "unacceptable the speed with which the impeachment of the constitutional and democratically elected President was conducted. Considering that it was a process for the removal of a Head of State, it is highly questionable that this could be done within 24 hours while still respecting the due process guarantees necessary for an impartial trial. The Commission considers that the procedure that was followed affects the rule of law."

On 26 June Reporters without Borders raised concerns about possible censorship of TV Pública Paraguay following the impeachment trial.

In contrast, some Uruguayan opposition politicians and analysts regarded the impeachment as lawful under the Paraguayan constitution, such as Juan Carlos Doyenart, Julio María Sanguinetti and Sergio Abreu.

== See also ==
- Impeachment of Dilma Rousseff
