= Beloved Fatherland Party =

Political party in Paraguay

Beloved Fatherland Party Partido Patria Querida
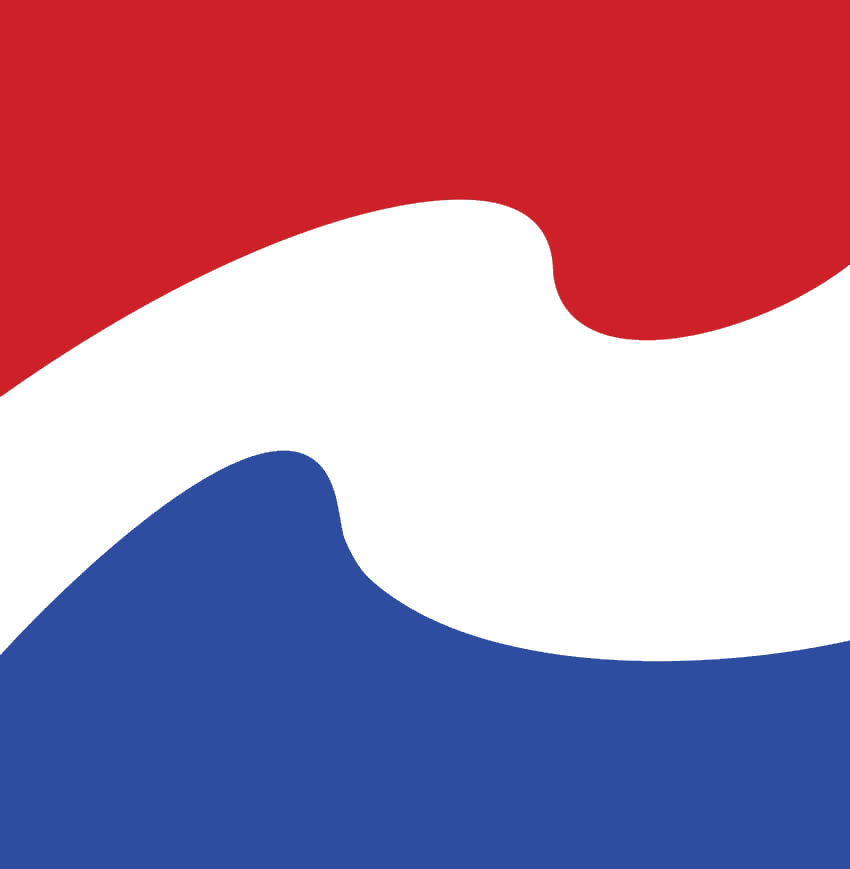
- Abbreviation: PPQ
- Leader: Stephan Rasmussen
- Founded: 26 December 2001
- Registered: 4 March 2004
- Headquarters: Padre Cardozo 469, Asunción, Paraguay
- Ideology: Conservative liberalism Civic nationalism
- Political position: Centre to centre-right
- Chamber of Deputies: 1 / 80
- Senate: 1 / 45

Website
- www.patriaquerida.org

The Beloved Fatherland Party (Spanish: Partido Patria Querida, PPQ) is a political party in Paraguay.

== History ==
Established in 2001, the party first contested national elections in 2003, when it won 10 seats in the Chamber of Deputies and seven in the Senate, becoming the joint third-largest party. Its presidential candidate Pedro Fadul received 21.9% of the popular vote.

In the 2008 elections it was reduced to three seats in the Chamber and four in the Senate, whilst Fadul won 2.5% of the vote in the presidential election. In the elections five years later, the party's seat share was reduced to one seat in the Chamber and none in the Senate, while the party's presidential candidate Miguel Carrizosa received 1.1% of the vote in the presidential election. In the 2018 elections, the party secured three seats in both the Senate and the Chamber of Deputies.
