= Constitution of Paraguay =

Overview of history and contents of Paraguay's constitution

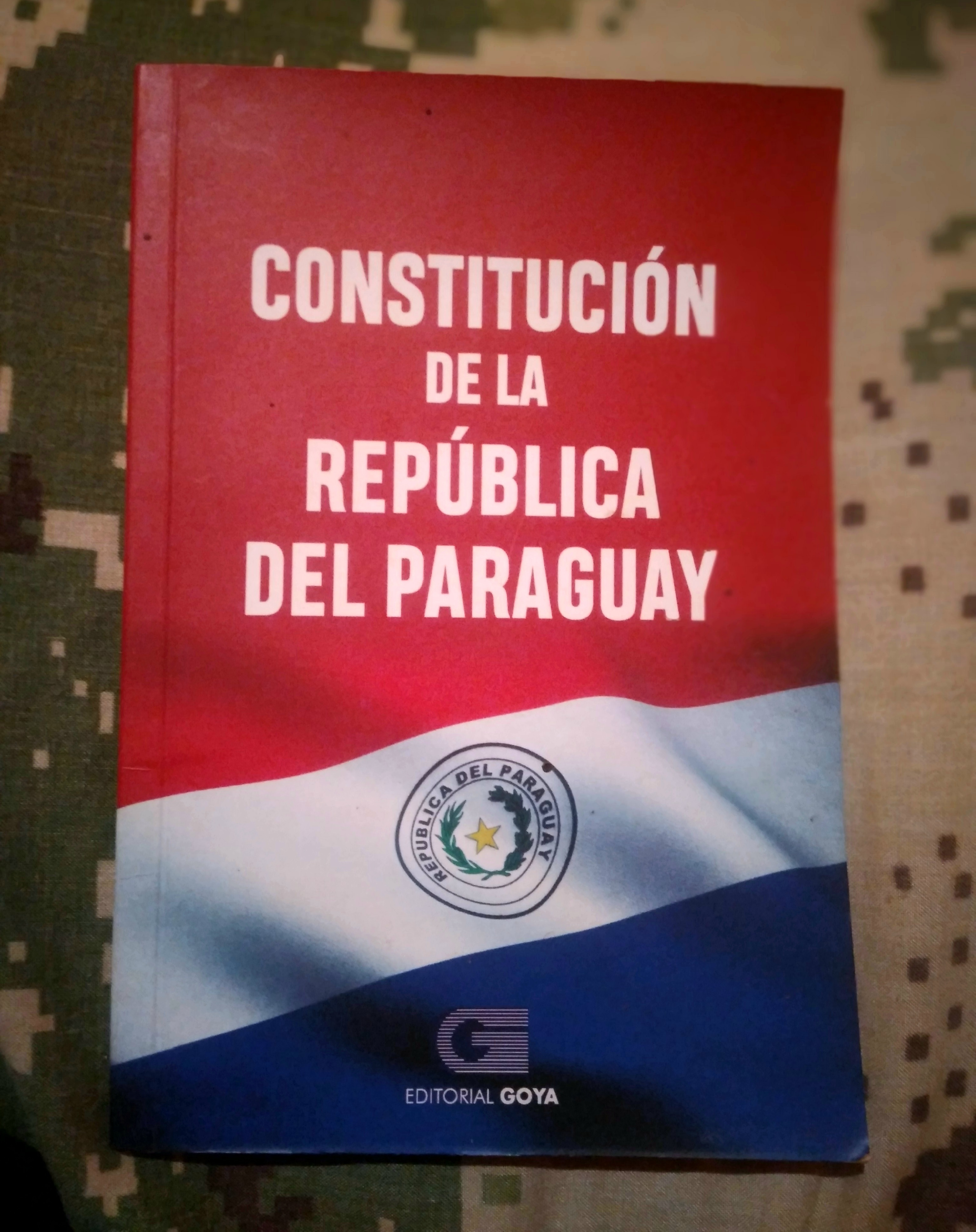
Copy of the Constitution of the Republic of Paraguay of 1992 by Editorial Goya (2021).

The Republic of Paraguay is governed under the constitution of 1992, which is the country's sixth since independence from Spain in 1811.

== Independence ==
The recorded history of Paraguay began in 1516 with the failed expedition of Juan Díaz de Solís to the Río de la Plata estuary, which divides Argentina and Uruguay. After further voyages of conquest, Paraguay became another of Spain's South American colonies. Paraguay finally gained its independence from Spain in 1811, and wrote their first constitution after.

== Constitutional Governmental Regulations of 1813 ==
The Constitutional Governmental Regulations, approved by the Congress of Paraguay two years after its independence from Spain in October 1813. The Constitutional Governmental Regulations contained seventeen articles, providing for a government by headed by two consuls, José Gaspar Rodríguez de Francia and Fulgencio Yegros. The framers also provided for a legislature of 1,000 representatives. Recognizing the importance of the military in the embattled country, the framers gave each consul the rank of brigadier general and divided the armed forces and arsenals equally between them. However within ten years of adoption the Constitutional Governmental Regulations, both Consul Yegros and the Paraguayan legislature had been eliminated and Francia ruled directly until his death in 1840.

== Constitution of 1844 ==
In 1841 Francia's successor, Carlos Antonio López, asked the legislature to revise the Constitutional Governmental Regulations. Three years later, a new constitution granted López powers as broad as those Francia had used to govern. Congress could make and interpret the laws, but only the President could order that they be promulgated and enforced. The constitution placed no restrictions on the powers of the president, beyond limiting his term of office to ten years. There was no mention of the word liberty in the entire text. Congress subsequently made López president for life. He died in 1862 after 22 years of rule. His son, Francisco Solano López, ruled under this constitution as well.

== Constitution of 1870 ==
At the end of the disastrous Paraguayan War (1865–1870), elections were held in July 1870 for a constituent assembly. The assembly adopted a new constitution in November 1870, which, with amendments, remained in force for seventy years. The constitution shared similarities to the Argentine constitution of 1853 and the Chilean constitution of 1833.

The constitution was based on principles of popular sovereignty, separation of powers, and a bicameral legislature consisting of a Senate and a Chamber of Representatives. Although its tenor was more democratic than the two previous constitutions, extensive power over the government and society in general remained in the hands of the president.

The constitution specified that an executive was elected to serve by an electoral college for four-year terms. A term limit was set, prohibiting a president from serving two consecutive terms. The constitution established a bicameral legislature with 13 senators and 20 deputies. Every two years, half the deputies were up for election and a third of the senators.

== Constitution of 1940 ==
On February 18, 1940 President José Felix Estigarribia responded to a political stalemate by dissolving Congress and assuming emergency powers. To dramatize his government's desire for change, he scrapped the 1870 constitution and promulgated a new one on July 10, 1940. It was based on the 1937 Brazilian constitution which had established the Estado Novo regime. The new constitution was a severely authoritarian document that reflected Estigarribia's concern for stability and power. It provided for an extremely powerful state, with sweeping powers vested in the executive. The president now was chosen in direct elections for a term of five years, and was eligible for a second term. He could intervene in the economy, control the press, suppress private groups, suspend individual liberties, and take exceptional actions for the good of the state. He also had the power to declare a state of siege, which allowed him to suspend civil liberties in either the entire country or a portion of it for 90 days. The Senate was abolished and a unicameral Chamber of Representatives reduced in power. A new advisory Council of State was created, modeled on the experience of corporatist Italy and Portugal, to represent group interests including business, farmers, bankers, the military, and the Roman Catholic Church. The military was entrusted with responsibility to safeguard the Constitution. On August 4, 1940 a referendum approved this constitution.

== Constitution of 1967 ==
After taking power in 1954, President Alfredo Stroessner governed for the next thirteen years under the constitution of 1940. A Constituent Assembly elected in 1967 drafted a new constitution that went into force later that year. It maintained the overall authoritarian character of the 1940 document, including the broad powers vested in the president. Nevertheless, it reinstated the Senate and renamed the lower house the Chamber of Deputies. In addition, the assembly allowed the president to be reelected for another two terms beginning in 1968.

The constitution of 1967 contained a preamble, eleven chapters with 231 articles, and a final chapter of transitory provisions. The first chapter contains eleven "fundamental statements" defining a wide variety of topics, including the political system (a unitary republic with a representative democratic government), the official languages (Spanish and Guaraní), and the official religion of Roman Catholicism. The next two chapters dealt with territory, civil divisions, nationality, and citizenship. Chapter four contained a number of general provisions, such as statements prohibiting the use of dictatorial powers, requiring public officials to act in accordance with the constitution, and entrusted national defense and public order to the armed forces and police, respectively.

Chapter five, with seventy-nine articles, was by far the longest section of the constitution, and deals in considerable detail with the rights of the population. This chapter purportedly guaranteed the population extensive liberty and freedom before the law without discrimination. In addition to the comprehensive individual rights, spelled out in thirty-three articles, there are sections covering social, economic, labor, and political rights. For example, Article 111 stipulates that "The suffrage is the right, duty, and public function of the voter... Its exercise will be obligatory within the limits to be established by law, and nobody could advocate or recommend electoral abstention." The formation of political parties was also guaranteed, although parties advocating the destruction of the republican regime or the multiparty representative democratic system are not permitted. This chapter also specified five obligations of citizens, including obedience to the constitution and laws, defense of the country, and employment in legal activities.

In practice, however, these rights were largely ignored, as Stroessner ruled under a state of siege for only a few short breaks from 1954 to 1987. This power, carried over from the 1940 constitution, allowed the president to suspend constitutional freedoms for up to 90 days in either all or part of the country. Within five days of declaring a state of siege, the president was required to notify Congress of his reasons for doing so, the rights being restricted, and the portion(s) of the country where it applied. Stroessner had declared a state of siege soon after taking office, and had it renewed every 90 days. Although the state of siege technically only applied to Asunción after 1970, the courts held that anyone charged with security offenses could be brought to the capital and tried under the state-of-siege provisions—even if the offense occurred elsewhere. Thus, despite the constitutional ban on exercising dictatorial powers, Stroessner ruled under what amounted to martial law for most of his tenure.

Chapter six identified agrarian reform as one of the fundamental factors for the achievement of rural well-being. It also called for the adoption of equitable systems of land distribution and ownership. Colonization was protected as an official program involving not only citizens but also foreigners.

Chapters seven through ten concerned the composition, selection, and functions of the legislature, executive, judiciary, and attorney general, respectively. Chapter eleven discussed provisions for amending or rewriting the constitution. The final chapter contained transitory articles. The most important of these stated that, for purposes of eligibility and re-eligibility of the president, only those terms that would be completed after the presidential term that expired on August 15, 1968 counted. The only constitutional amendment, that of March 25, 1977, modified this article to allow the president to run for an unlimited number of five-year terms.

== Constitution of 1992 ==
Stroessner was overthrown in a 1989 coup led by one of his longtime confidants, Andrés Rodríguez. Per the provisions of the 1967 Constitution, Rodríguez assumed power as interim president and was elected later that year to serve the balance of Stroessner's eighth term. The constitution required new elections if a president dies or resigns less than two years into a term, and only then for the balance of the term.

Rodriguez governed for three years under the 1967 Constitution. That document was replaced with a much more democratic constitution in 1992. It provides for a division of government powers among three branches.

While the presidency remained the key institution, its powers were significantly reduced in response to the abuses of the past. The president is limited to a single five-year term, with no possibility of reelection even if it is non-successive. No one who has held the office, even for a partial term, is allowed to run or serve again.

The presidency was hedged about with the first meaningful system of checks and balances the country had ever seen. For instance, Congress acquired the power to impeach and remove the president and state ministers; there had been no such provision in the 1967 constitution.

The president also lost the power to appoint and dismiss judges and dissolve the legislature at will, and also lost his previous control over government spending.

The ban on any sort of presidential reelection has become so entrenched that protests ensued in 2017 when the legislature deliberated an amendment that would have allowed a president to run for a second five-year term, even if it is nonconsecutive. Had it passed, a president would have to leave office for good at the end of the second term. The amendment would have cleared the way for incumbent Horacio Cartes to run for reelection the following year. The Constitution establishes that any modifications to a president's term should occur via a reform and not an amendment. However, the opposition to the planned amendment was so fierce that Cartes ultimately gave up any plans to run again, and the amendment was defeated.

== See also ==
- 1991 Paraguayan Constitutional Assembly election
