= Guasú Front =

Electoral alliance in Paraguay

Guasú Front Frente Guasú
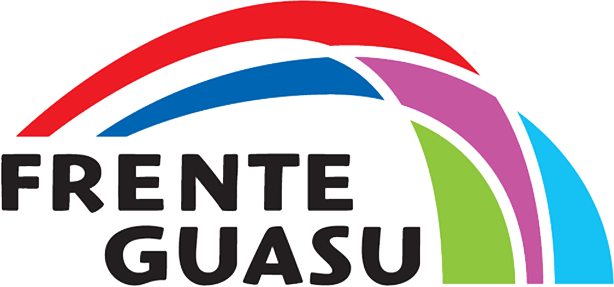
- Leader: Fernando Lugo
- President: Carlos Filizzola
- Founded: 20 March 2010
- Merger of: APC; Unitary Space – People's Congress
- Headquarters: Asunción
- Ideology: Socialism; Democratic socialism Socialism of the 21st century Left-wing nationalism Factions: Communism; Marxism–Leninism
- Political position: Centre-left to left-wing Factions: Far-left
- National affiliation: Great Renewed National Alliance; Concertación
- Regional affiliation: São Paulo Forum
- International affiliation: Sovintern; SI; PA
- Colours: Violet
- Chamber of Deputies: 0 / 80
- Senate: 1 / 45

Website
- www.frenteguasu.org.py

The Guasú Front (Spanish: Frente Guasú; Guasú being the Guarani word for "big", "large" or "great") or Frente Guasu Alliance is a democratic socialist electoral alliance in Paraguay for the general election in 2013. It was formed in 2010 by a merger of the centre-left Patriotic Alliance for Change and the left-wing Unitary Space – People's Congress. It consists of eleven parties, including the Party for a Country of Solidarity, the Tekojoja People's Party. It is led by impeached former president Fernando Lugo, who also ran as a senatorial candidate. Its presidential candidate was Aníbal Carrillo.

== Electoral history ==
=== Presidential elections ===
Election	Party candidate	Votes	%	Result
2013	Aníbal Carrillo	79,573	3.49%	Lost ✗

=== Chamber of Deputies elections ===
Election	Votes	%	Seats	+/–
2013	122,440	5.46%	1 / 80	▲1
2018	42,891	1.81%	0 / 80	▼1
2023	33,257	1.17%	0 / 80	-

=== Senate elections ===
Election	Votes	%	Seats	+/–
2013	238,313	10.60%	5 / 45	▲5
2018	279,008	11.83%	6 / 45	▲1
2023	60,774	2.11%	1 / 45	▼5
