= Christian Democratic Party (Paraguay) =

Political party in Paraguay

Christian Democratic Party Partido Demócrata Cristiano
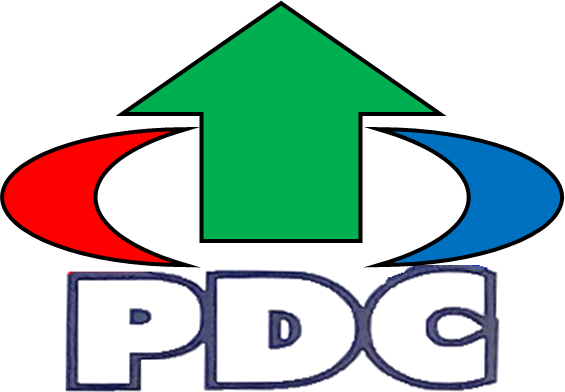
- Founded: 15 May 1960
- Ideology: Christian democracy
- Political position: Centre-left
- National affiliation: Concertación
- Regional affiliation: Christian Democrat Organization of America
- International affiliation: Centrist Democrat International

Website
- www.pdc.org.py

The Christian Democratic Party (Spanish: Partido Demócrata Cristiano, PDC) is a political party in Paraguay.

== History ==
The party was established in May 1960 and was one of the parties that renounced violence as a means of toppling the Stroessner regime. However, the party did not contest a national election until Stroessner was overthrown in 1989. In the general elections later that year it received 1% of the vote, but failed to win a seat. It won a single seat in the 1991 Constitutional Assembly election, and in the 1993 general elections ran as part of the Social Democratic Coalition with the Paraguayan Humanist Party, but failed to win a seat. It again failed to win a seat in the 1998 elections, and the 2003 elections saw its vote share drop to just 0.2% in the Senate elections and 0.1% in the Chamber of Deputies election. For the 2008 elections it was part of the Patriotic Alliance for Change, which won two seats.
