= Senate of Paraguay =

Upper house of the Paraguayan Congress

Chamber of Senators Cámara de Senadores

Type
- Type: Upper house of the Congress of Paraguay

History
- Founded: 1870

Leadership
- President of the Senate: Basilio Núñez, ANR since 30 June 2024

Structure
- Seats: 45
- Political groups: Government (24): ANR-PC (24); Opposition (21): PLRA (7); PCN (2); Independent (6); FG (1); PPQ (1); PPH (1); PDP (1); PEN (1); CDN (1)

Elections
- Voting system: Proportional representation
- Last election: 30 April 2023

Meeting place
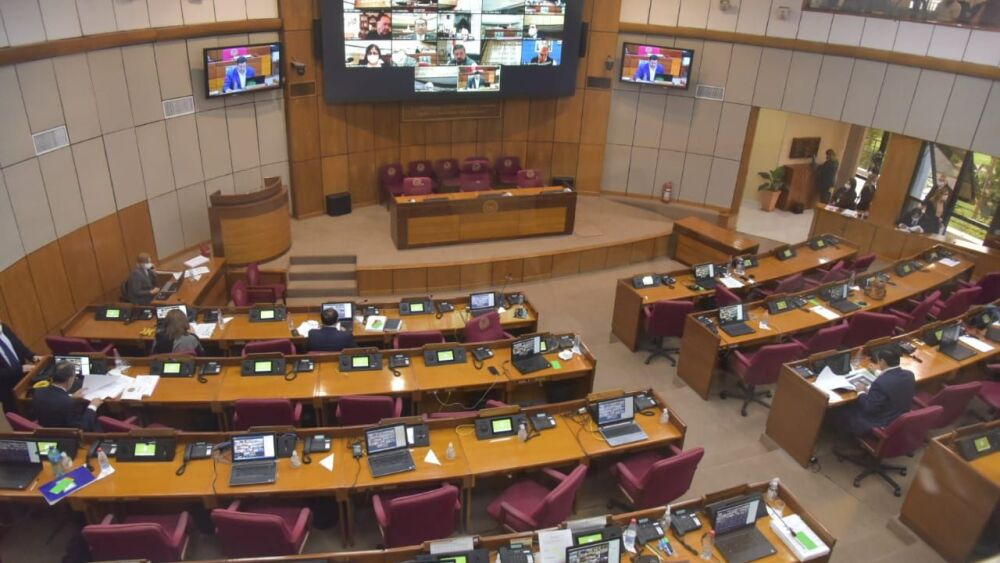

Website
- Chamber of Senators

The Chamber of Senators of Paraguay (Cámara de Senadores), the upper house of the National Congress, has 45 members, elected for a five-year term by proportional representation.

The Paraguayan bicameral legislature, which included the Senate, was formed in 1870. The Senate was abolished in 1940 and recreated in 1967.

== See also ==
- List of presidents of the Senate of Paraguay
