= First Lady of Paraguay =

Wife of the President of Paraguay

- Flag of Paraguay
- Incumbent; Fabiana Maria Souto since 6 November 2026
- Style: Madam
- Residence: Mburuvicha Róga

First Lady of Paraguay (Spanish: Primera Dama de Paraguay), also called First Lady of the Nation (Spanish: Primera Dama de la Nación), is the official post of the wife (or designated person) of the president of Paraguay. The official workplace of the Paraguayan first lady is Mburuvicha Róga. The current first lady of Paraguay is Fabiana Maria Souto, wife of former Vice president Pedro Alliana, who succeeded to the presidency on 6 November 2026.

== Structure ==
According to Paraguayan law, the Office of the First Lady of the Nation depends structurally and financially on the presidency of the republic. The first lady exercises her duties through the REPADEH (Red Paraguaya para el Desarrollo Humano) Foundation, focused mainly in social and health affairs.

With the exception of a 14-month period between 2012–2013, Paraguay did not have a president's wife as First Lady for a decade, between 2008 and 2018. As Fernando Lugo, who was elected President in 2008, was unmarried, he designated his elder sister, Mercedes Lugo, as First Lady. After Lugo was impeached and succeeded by Federico Franco, Franco's wife Emilia Alfaro de Franco assumed the post; however, Franco's successor, Horacio Cartes, one day after assuming the presidency, ended the title of First Lady instead of handing it to his estranged wife, María Montaña de Cartes.

== Partial list of first ladies ==
Portrait	First Lady	Tenure begins	Tenure ends	President of Paraguay	Notes
	Juana Pabla Carrillo	1844	1862	Carlos Antonio López	
	Eliza Lynch	1862	1869	Francisco Solano López	
	Clara Recalde	1870	1870	Facundo Machaín	
	Vacant	1870	1871	Cirilo Antonio Rivarola	
	Ercilia Bogado	1871	1874	Salvador Jovellanos	
	María Concepción Díaz de Bedoya	1874	1877	Juan Bautista Gill	
	Etelvina Trinidad Mercedes Velilla	1877	1878	Higinio Uriarte	
	Atanasia Escato	1878	1880	Cándido Bareiro	
	María Concepción Díaz de Bedoya	1880	1886	Bernardino Caballero	
	Ramona Ignacia Garcete	1886	1890	Patricio Escobar	
	Rosa Peña Guanes	1890	1894	Juan Gualberto González	
	Ramona Bareiro Caballero	1894	1894	Marcos Morínigo	
	Casiana Isasi	1894	1898	Juan Bautista Egusquiza	
	Josefina Rivarola	1898	1902	Emilio Aceval	
	Margarita Salomoni	1902	1902	Andrés Héctor Carvallo	
	Josefa Rojas	1902	1904	Juan Antonio Escurra	
	Regina Corti Onetto	1904	1905	Juan Bautista Gaona	
	Marcelina Allende	1905	1906	Cecilio Báez	
	María del Carmen de la Mora Isasi	1906 – 1908	1908	Benigno Ferreira	
	Adela da Fontoura Lima	1908	1910	Emiliano González Navero	
	Emilia Victoria Alfaro	1910	1911	Manuel Gondra	
	Vacant	August 15, 1916	June 5, 1919	Manuel Franco {unmarried)	
	Silvia Ester Heisecke	August 16, 1937	August 15, 1939	Félix Paiva	
	Julia Miranda Cueto	August 15, 1939	September 7, 1940	José Félix Estigarribia	
	Dolores Ferrari	September 7, 1940	June 3, 1948	Higinio Morínigo	
	Escolástica Patiño (deceased prior to presidency)	September 11, 1949	May 8, 1954	Federico Chávez (widowed)	
	Lilia Isabel Arza	May 4, 1954	August 15, 1954	Tomás Romero Pereira	
	Ligia Stroessner	August 15, 1954	February 3, 1989	Alfredo Stroessner	
	Nélida Reig Castellanos	February 3, 1989	August 15, 1993	Andrés Rodríguez Pedotti	
	María Teresa Carrasco	August 15, 1993	August 15, 1998	Juan Carlos Wasmosy	
	Mirtha Leonor Gusinky	August 15, 1998	March 29, 1999	Raúl Cubas Grau	
	Susana Galli Romañach	March 29, 1999	August 15, 2003	Luis Ángel González Macchi	
	Gloria Penayo	August 15, 2003	August 15, 2008	Nicanor Duarte Frutos	
	Vacant	August 15, 2008	June 22, 2012	Fernando Lugo	
	Emilia Alfaro	June 22, 2012	August 15, 2013	Federico Franco	
	Vacant	August 15, 2013	August 15, 2018	Horacio Cartes	
	Silvana López Moreira	August 15, 2018	August 15, 2023	Mario Abdo Benítez	
	Leticia Ocampos	August 15, 2023	November 6, 2026	Santiago Peña	
	Fabiana Maria Souto	November 6, 2026		Pedro Alliana	
