= Paraguay–Taiwan relations =

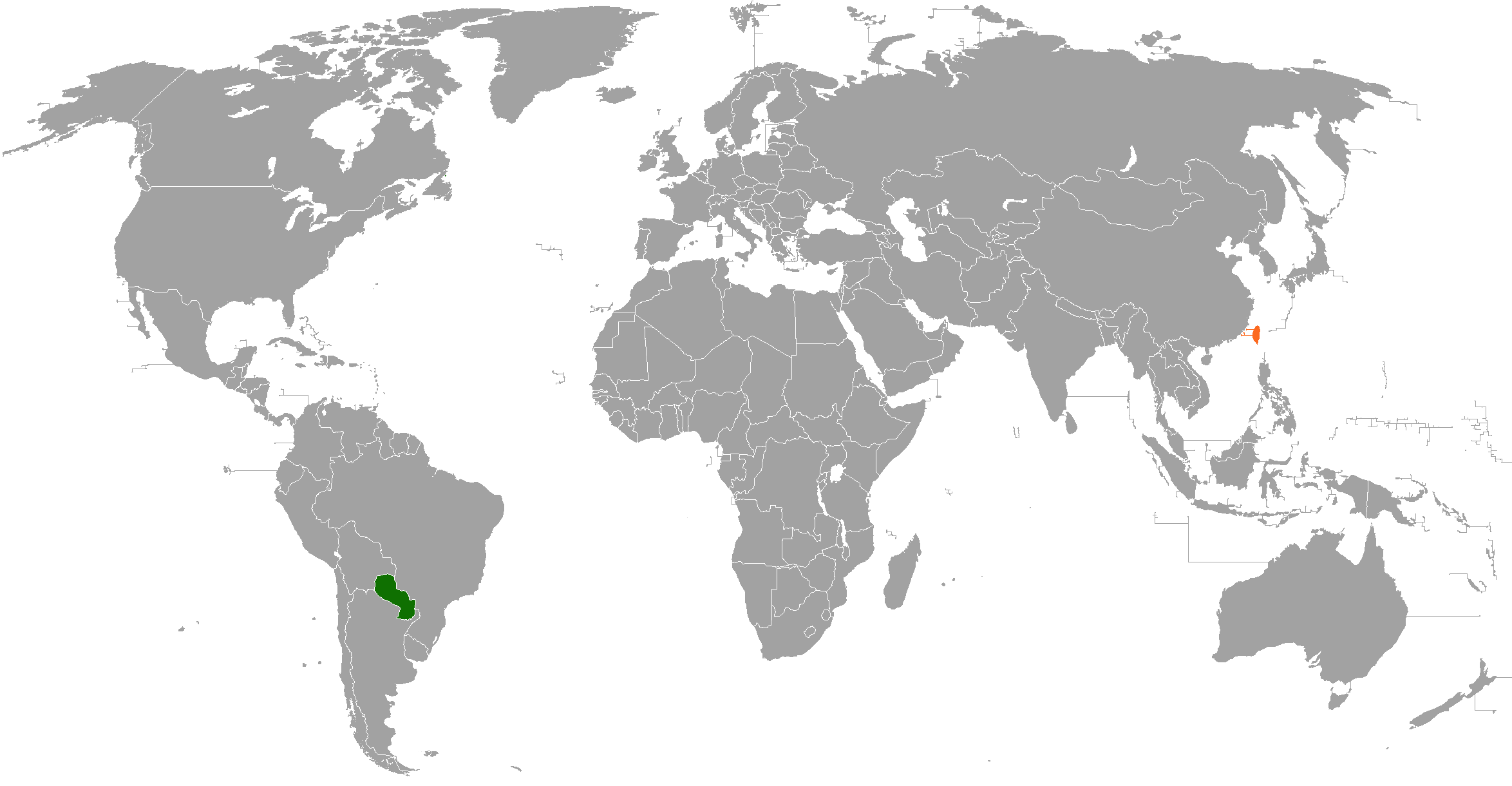

- Paraguay: Taiwan

The Republic of Paraguay and the Republic of China (Taiwan) established diplomatic relations on 8 July 1957.

Paraguay does not conform to the one China principle and is one of the 12 countries in the world (and the only one in South America). Paraguay has had an embassy in Taipei since 1999.

The two are antipodes of each other. The ROC is the second state in Asia (after Japan) to have diplomatic relations with Paraguay. In public media, the relationship between the two countries has been described as a historic friendship. Paraguay's relationship with Taiwan endured principally because of donations and loans; this method is criticized by governmental leaders for suspected corruption.

== History ==
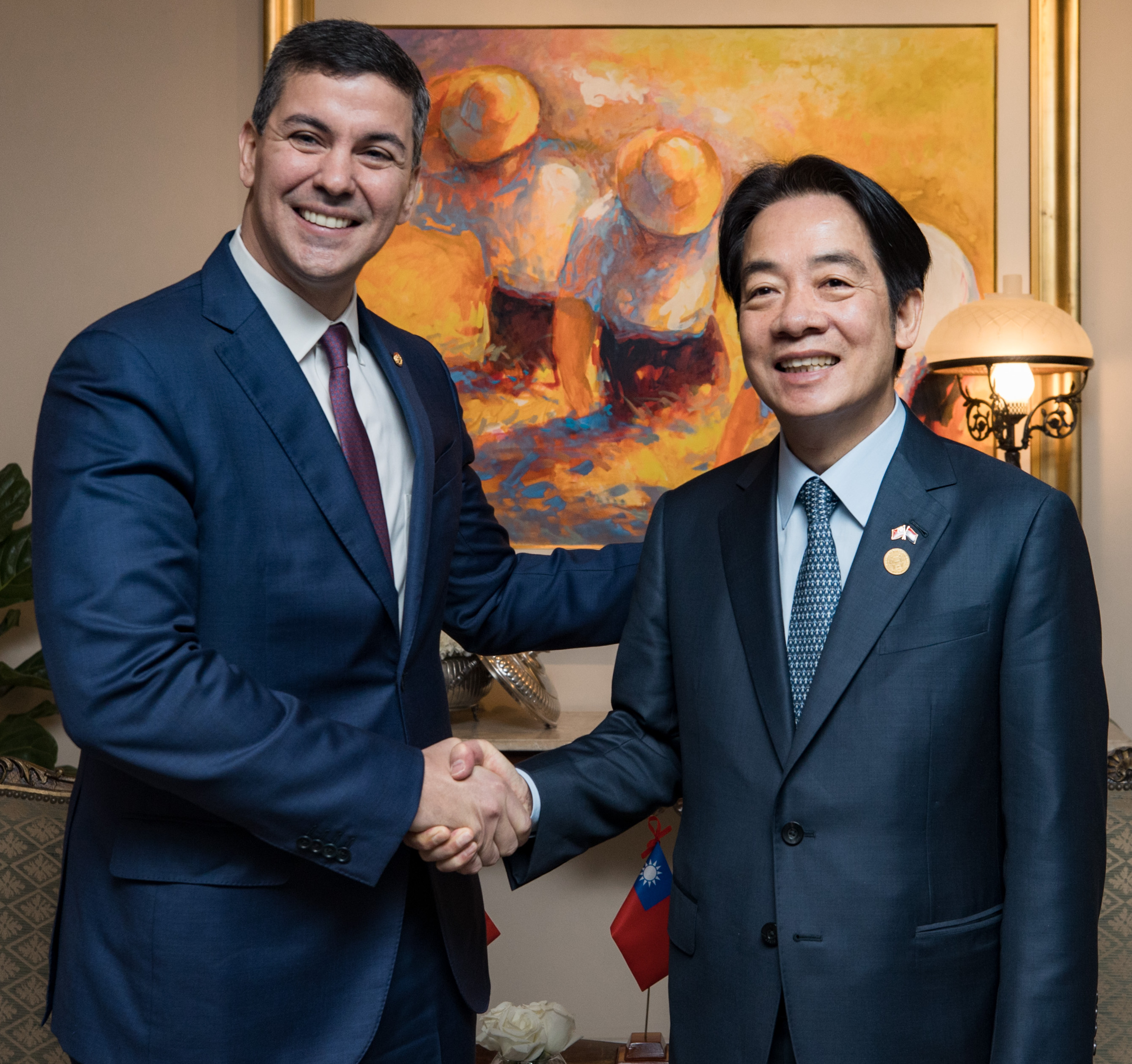
President of Paraguay Santiago Peña and then-Vice President of the ROC William Lai in Asunción, August 2023

The governments of Paraguay and the Republic of China established diplomatic relations on July 8, 1957, as the sole legal government of China. Over the following decades, the two governments signed the Cultural Convention (1961), Treaty of Friendship (1968), and Conventions of Tourism and Investments (1975). When Paraguay and Taiwan began relations, Alfredo Stroessner ordered the construction of a statue of Taiwanese leader Chiang Kai-Shek as a showing of friendship.

The partnership between the anti-communist governments of General Alfredo Stroessner and Generalissimo Chiang Kai-shek was quite natural. Many Paraguayan officers went for training in Fu Hsing Kang College in Taiwan.

The ousting of Stroessner in 1989, and his successor Andrés Rodríguez's reinventing himself as a democratically elected president, were immediately followed by invitations from the People's Republic of China to switch diplomatic recognition. However, the experienced general and politician Wang Sheng who happened to serve as Taiwan's ambassador at the time, and his diplomatic staff, were able to convince the Paraguayans that continuing the relationship with ROC, and thus keeping Taiwan's development assistance and access to Taiwan's markets, would be more advantageous for Paraguay. As the ROC Commercial Attaché at Asunción, Tseng Cheng-te, explained later, "I tried constantly to figure out what we could buy from them. It was very difficult, because they have nothing to offer".

=== 1990s ===
Taiwan (ROC) provided assistance to Paraguay on a number of economic development projects throughout the 1990s, and has extended large loans to Paraguay; as of early 2009, Taiwan's government was offering payment deferral on a $400 million outstanding loan.

The bilateral relationship has been increasingly affected by China's economic growth and its rigid approach to the One China Policy. The People's Republic of China is a major buyer of Paraguay's major exports, especially soy and beef. It has also made large investments in those sectors, directly affecting the Paraguayan economy. This has led to increasingly prominent debates within Paraguay over recognition policy. "While commercial ties increase, China may be gaining other forms of leverage over Paraguay; pro-China rumblings surfaced in late 2019 largely from meat producers whose market can be curtailed through phytosanitary regulations."

=== 2000s ===
Paraguay's UN General Assembly sessions for the return of the Republic of China into the United Nations' Organization. However, in the fall of 2008, the recently elected Paraguayan president Fernando Lugo (whose inauguration, just a few days previously, had been attended by Taiwan's Ma Ying-jeou) announced that his country would not do so at the 63rd annuals session of the General Assembly.

=== 2010s ===
In 2010, when Paraguay president Fernando Lugo planned to establish diplomatic relations with China, it meant that it had to break with Taiwan. Lugo already commented in 2008 that existed an intense commercial relation, even without a China Embassy in Paraguay. In 2010, this though lead to China not wishing to recognize Paraguay's relationship with Taiwan and leaving Paraguay to choose between one of the two countries.

Under President Mario Abdo Benítez, in office since August 2018, Paraguay has emphasized a pro-Taiwan policy while also seeking commercial opportunities with the PRC. "He has emphasized a desire to expand commercial relations with PRC, 'always respecting our historic friendship with Taiwan'."

In 2018, Paraguay was the last South American country that still recognised Taiwan.

=== 2020s ===
In May 2021, Paraguay was one of 15 countries that maintained diplomatic relations with Taiwan.

In the 2020s, Taiwan helped Paraguay set up an artificial breeding operation for pacu.

In January 2023, Efrain Alegre, presidential candidate for the 2023 Paraguayan general election, told Reuters that in case he wins the election in April, Paraguay would cut Taiwan ties and open relations with China, hoping to boost Paraguay's soy and beef exports. Incumbent Santiago Peña won by a comfortable margin, reassuring the Taiwanese that their ongoing bilateral relations were not imperiled.

In December 2024, Paraguay declared a Chinese envoy persona non grata for allegedly interfering in internal affairs in attempting to get Paraguay to break relations with Taiwan. Taiwan has also accused Chinese firm Huawei of spying on its diplomats in Paraguay.

== Economic relations ==
Taiwan is a major customer of Paraguayan beef and pork products, with 88 percent of exported pork in 2025 going to Taiwan, alongside being the second largest market for Paraguyan beef exported in 2025.

Both countries are constructing the "Taiwan-Paraguay Smart Technology Park" in Ciudad del Este, with focus on productions of an electric bus and textiles.

In 2004, Taiwan and Paraguay attempted to negotiate a free trade agreement, but the effort to obtain approval from Paraguay's MERCOSUR's partners (none of which has diplomatic relations with Taiwan) made the process difficult. Since 27 February 2018, the free trade agreement has entered into effect.

== Educational relations ==
Both countries maintain a university in Paraguay, the Polytechnic University Taiwan - Paraguay. Established in 2018, the university focuses on technical higher education. In 2025, construction began on a new campus with a capacity for a thousand students.

== Contestation within Paraguay ==
In recent years, the bilateral relationship has been the subject of growing contention in Paraguay. Long and Urdinez note that the PRC's growth increased Paraguay's opportunity costs, especially in the form of lost loans and investments from mainland China during the commodities boom. However, Taiwan continued to enjoy support from many Paraguayan policymakers. In response to arguments that recognizing the People's Republic was economically necessary, "Key Paraguayan elites have proactively pushed back against the idea that a change in recognition is inevitable or beneficial." On April 17, 2020, in the midst of the COVID-19 pandemic, a group of Paraguayan senators advanced a bill to urge the president to shift Paraguay's recognition of China from Taipei to Beijing. The proposal was defeated 25–16. Proponents argued that the PRC would provide greater medical aid to Paraguay, something the ROC contested by increasing its own provision of assistance after declaring that they would suspend relations between the countries. The vote followed growing political pressure within Paraguay, especially from ranchers seeking greater access to the Chinese market for their beef exports.

== High level visits ==
=== Visits from Paraguay (after 1987/01) ===
Heads of state	Name (date of visit)	Notes
President of Paraguay
President of Paraguay	President Andrés Rodríguez Pedotti (1990/05)	
President of Paraguay	President Luis Ángel González Macchi (1999/09, 2002/08)	
President of Paraguay	President Óscar Nicanor Duarte Frutos (2004/05, 2007/10)	
President of Paraguay	President Fernando Armindo Lugo Méndez (2011/03, 2012/05)	
President of Paraguay	President Federico Franco (2013/05)	
President of Paraguay	President Horacio Manuel Cartes Jara (2014/10, 2016/05)	
	President Santiago Peña Palacios (2023/07, 2024/05)	
President of the Senate of Paraguay / President of the Chamber of Deputies of Paraguay
President of the Senate of Paraguay / President of the Chamber of Deputies of Paraguay	President of Deputies of Paraguay 丁尼斯 (1988/06)	
President of the Senate of Paraguay / President of the Chamber of Deputies of Paraguay	President of Chamber of Deputies of Paraguay 艾吉諾 (1988/06)	
President of the Senate of Paraguay / President of the Chamber of Deputies of Paraguay	President of Chamber of Deputies of Paraguay José Antonio Moreno Ruffinelli (1993/04)	
President of the Senate of Paraguay / President of the Chamber of Deputies of Paraguay	President of Chamber of Senators of Paraguay Miguel Abdon Saguler (1997/01)	
President of the Senate of Paraguay / President of the Chamber of Deputies of Paraguay	President of Chamber of Deputies of Paraguay Efraín Alegre (1999/08)	
President of the Senate of Paraguay / President of the Chamber of Deputies of Paraguay	President of Chamber of Deputies of Paraguay Candido Vera Bejarano (2001/01)	
President of the Senate of Paraguay / President of the Chamber of Deputies of Paraguay	President of Chamber of Deputies of Paraguay Juan Roque Galeano Villalba (2002/03)	
President of the Senate of Paraguay / President of the Chamber of Deputies of Paraguay	President of Chamber of Deputies of Paraguay Juan Dario Monges Espinola (2002/03)	
President of the Senate of Paraguay / President of the Chamber of Deputies of Paraguay	President of Chamber of Deputies of Paraguay Oscar Gonzalez Daher (2003/03)	
President of the Senate of Paraguay / President of the Chamber of Deputies of Paraguay	President of Chamber of Deputies of Paraguay Benjamin Maciel Pasotti (2003/11)	
President of the Senate of Paraguay / President of the Chamber of Deputies of Paraguay	President of Chamber of Deputies of Paraguay Carlos Mateo Balmelli (2004/02)	
President of the Senate of Paraguay / President of the Chamber of Deputies of Paraguay	President of Chamber of Deputies of Paraguay Óscar Rubén Salomón (2005/01)	
President of the Senate of Paraguay / President of the Chamber of Deputies of Paraguay	President of Chamber of Senatorsof Paraguay Miguel Carrizosa Galiano (2005/01)	
President of the Senate of Paraguay / President of the Chamber of Deputies of Paraguay	President of Chamber of Senatorsof Paraguay Carlos Alberto Filizzola Pallarés (2006/01)	
President of the Senate of Paraguay / President of the Chamber of Deputies of Paraguay	President of Chamber of Deputies of Paraguay Víctor Alcides Bogado González (2006/03, 2007/01, 2010/11, 2012/02, 2013/01, 2013/05)	
President of the Senate of Paraguay / President of the Chamber of Deputies of Paraguay	President of Chamber of Senatorsof Paraguay Enrique Gonzalez Quintana (2009/01)	
President of the Senate of Paraguay / President of the Chamber of Deputies of Paraguay	President of Chamber of Deputies of Paraguay Enrique Salyn Buzarquis Cáceres (2009/02)	
President of the Senate of Paraguay / President of the Chamber of Deputies of Paraguay	President of Chamber of Deputies of Paraguay César Ariel Oviedo Verdún (2010/03)	
President of the Senate of Paraguay / President of the Chamber of Deputies of Paraguay	President of Chamber of Senatorsof Paraguay Julio César Velázquez Tillería (2014/01)	
President of the Senate of Paraguay / President of the Chamber of Deputies of Paraguay	President of Chamber of Deputies of Paraguay Juan Bartolomé Ramírez (2014/02)	
President of the Senate of Paraguay / President of the Chamber of Deputies of Paraguay	President of Chamber of Deputies of Paraguay Hugo Velázquez Moreno (2014/11, 2015/09)	
President of the Senate of Paraguay / President of the Chamber of Deputies of Paraguay	President of Chamber of Senatorsof Paraguay Mario Abdo Benítez (2016/01)	
President of the Senate of Paraguay / President of the Chamber of Deputies of Paraguay	President of Chamber of Senatorsof Paraguay Roberto Acevedo Quevedo (2017/05)	

=== Visits from Republic of China (after 1987/01) ===
Head of state	Name (date of visit)	Notes
President of the Republic of China
President of the Republic of China	President Lee Teng-hui (September 1997)	
President of the Republic of China	President Chen Shui-bian (May 2001, May 2006)	
President of the Republic of China	President Ma Ying-jeou (August 2008, August 2013)	
President of the Republic of China	President Tsai Ing-wen (June 2016, August 2018)	
President of the Executive Yuan of the Republic of China
President of the Executive Yuan of the Republic of China	Premier Yu Kuo-hwa (August 1988)	
President of Control Yuan of the Republic of China		
President of Control Yuan of the Republic of China	President of Control Yuan Chen Li-an (August 1993)	

== Resident diplomatic missions ==
of Paraguay in Taiwan

- Taipei (Embassy)

of Taiwan in Paraguay

- Asunción (Embassy)
- Ciudad del Este (Consulate-General)

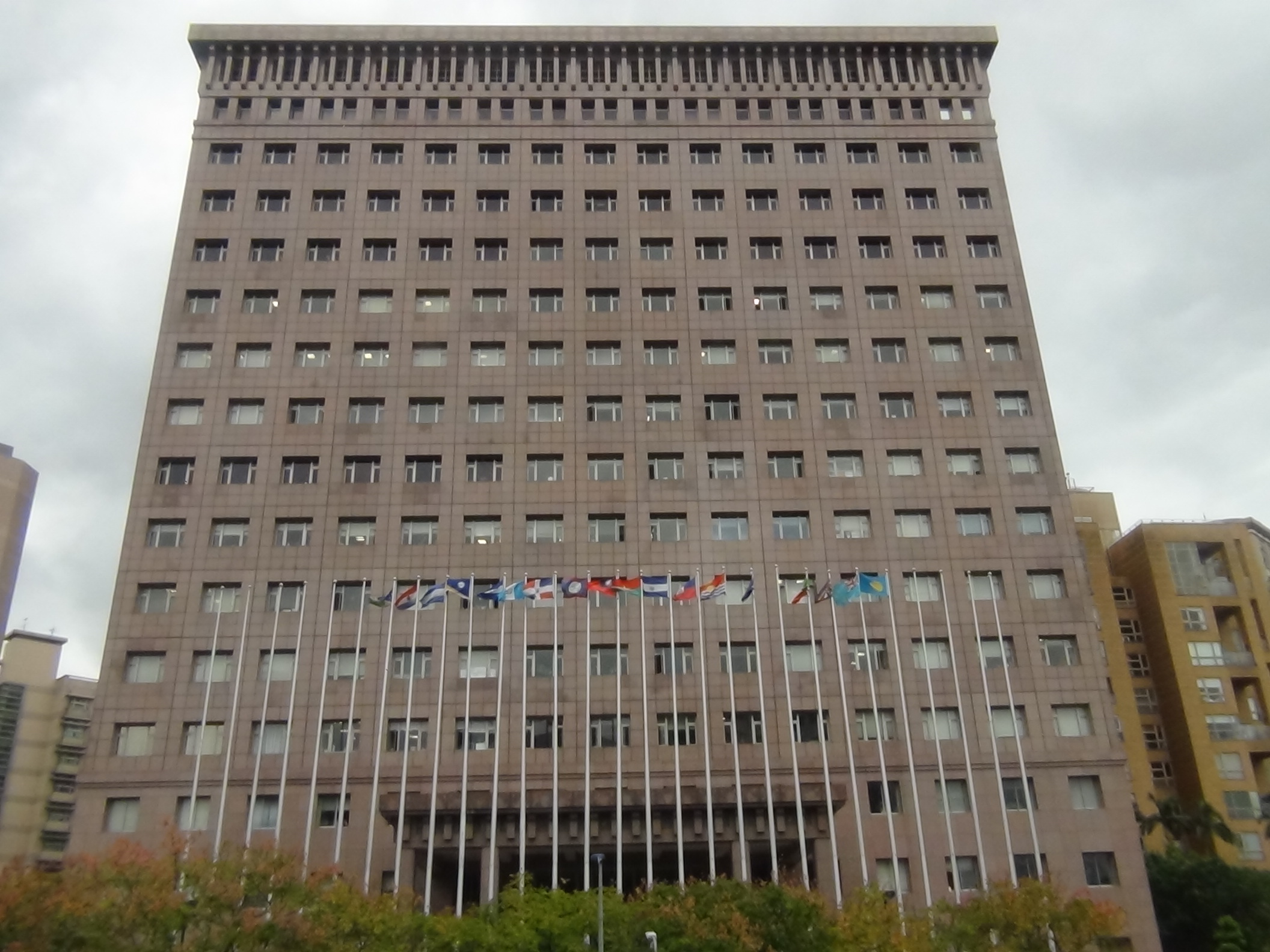
Building hosting the Embassy of Paraguay in Taipei

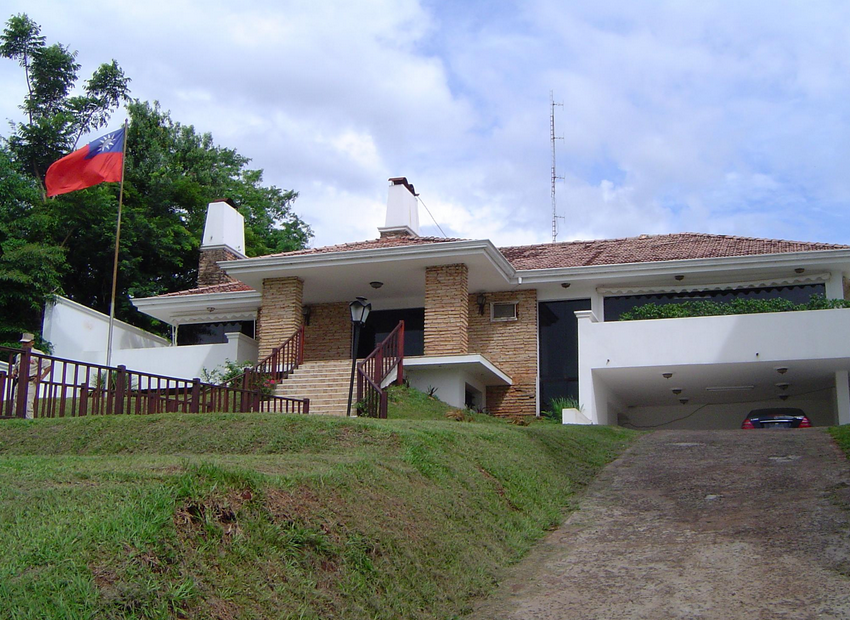
Consulate-General of Taiwan in Ciudad del Este

== See also ==
- Foreign relations of Paraguay
- Foreign relations of Taiwan
