= Palacio de los López =

Building and seat of government in Paraguay

- Óga Guasu Los López pegua (Guarani)
- The López Presidential Palace in Asunción

- Location within Paraguay
- Alternative names: Palace of the López

General information
- Location: Asunción, Paraguay
- Coordinates: 25°16′39.49″S 57°38′15.25″W
- Completed: 1867

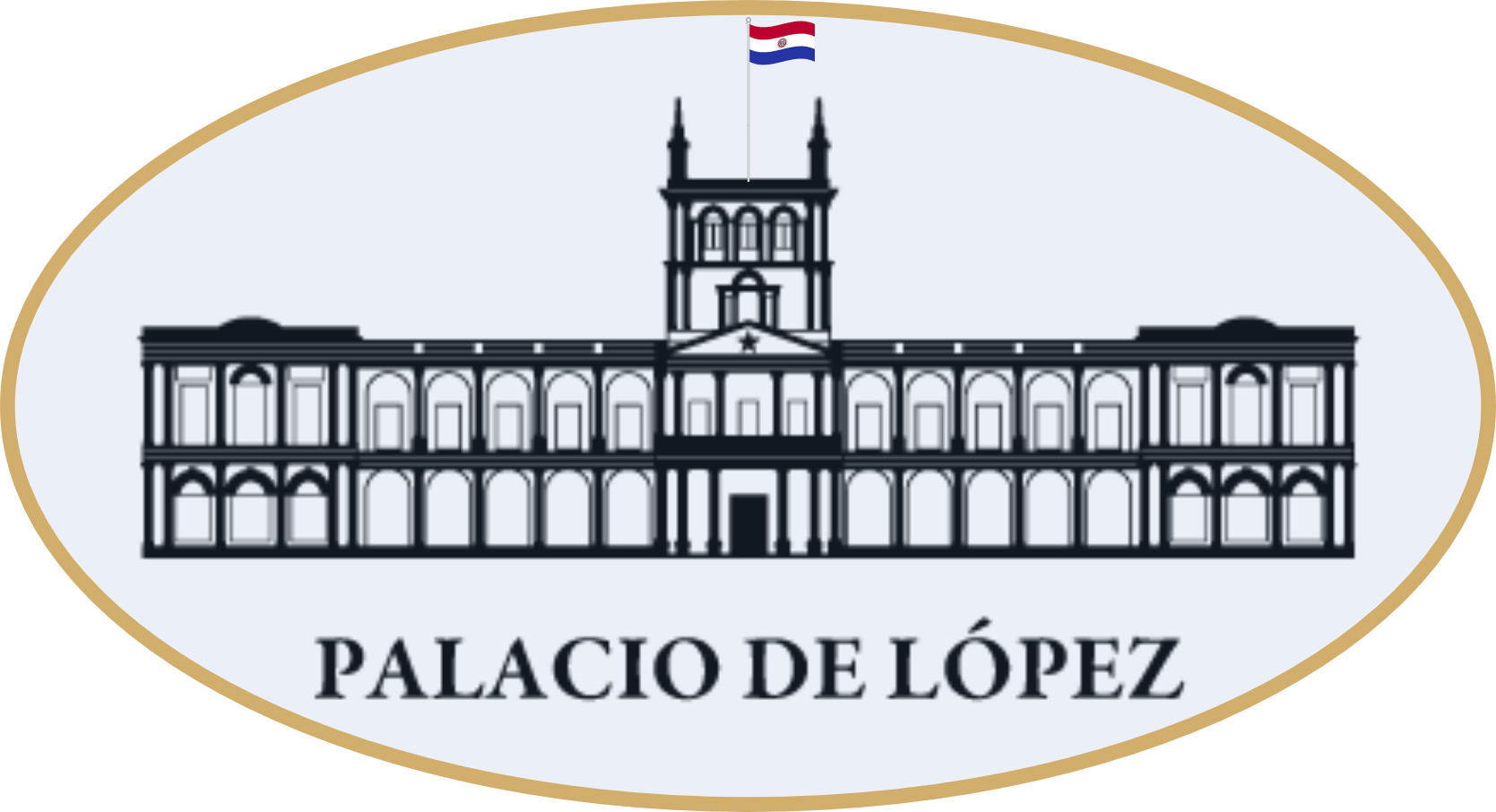
Logo.

Palacio de los López (Spanish for Palace of the López; Guarani: Óga Guasu Los López pegua), officially titled Palacio de Gobierno (Palace of Government) is a neoclassical manor in Asunción, Paraguay, that serves as a workplace for the President of Paraguay, and as the seat of the government of Paraguay. The president does not reside in the palace, and is instead housed at Mburuvicha Róga (Guarani for House of the Chief), some 2.5 km to the southeast.

Located in the center of Asunción, overlooking Asunción Bay, Palacio de los López was built by order of Carlos Antonio López, the first Paraguyan head of state to hold the title of President, per the constitution of 1844. The dictator envisioned a López dynasty, and he intended for the palace to house his son and designated successor, General Francisco Solano López, which gives rise to the palace's name. Ultimately, Solano López never resided there.

Construction of the palace began in 1857 under the direction of the English architect Alonso Taylor, and was substantially completed by 1867. The War of the Triple Alliance compelled Solano López to seek refuge with the government in Ñeembucú. Brazilian and Argentine forces sacked Asunción in January 1869, damaging the palace's exterior and looting ornaments and furniture. The allies housed troops there throughout their seven-year occupation of Paraguay, leaving the building derelict by 1876.

President Juan Gualberto González, on taking office in 1890, strove to restore the palace and complete what had been left undone in 1867, but a coup halted his progress. Juan Bautista Egusquiza finally finished the work in 1894 and became the first head of state to establish his administration and residence there. The palace remained the official residence of the president until the mid-20th century. November 1942 saw the move to Mburuvicha Róga by decree of President Higinio Morínigo.

Palacio de los López continued on as the seat of government throughout the latter 20th century under the despotic rule of President Alfredo Stroessner, until the restoration of democracy in 1989. No president since that time has served for longer than a single five-year term, and presidential reelection (even in non-consecutive terms) is today strictly prohibited by constitutional reforms ratified in 1992. The building is kept brightly illuminated at night, showing off its color and architectural features.
