= List of presidents of the Senate of Paraguay =

The president of the Senate of Paraguay is the presiding officer in the Senate of Paraguay. The president is elected by the Senate of Paraguay for one-year term.

== Presidents 1870 - 1940 ==
Name	Took office	Left office	Notes
Juan León Corvalán	? - April 1871	May 1871 - ?	
José Mateo Collar	? - June 1871	August 1871	
Juan León Corvalán	August 1871	September 1871 - ?	
Salvador Jovellanos	8 December 1871	18 December 1871	
Juan Bautista Gill	18 December 1871	8 March 1872	
Juan J. Brizuela	8 March 1872	3 April 1872	
Juan A. Roa	3 April 1872	22 May 1872	
Miguel Palacios	22 May 1872	November 1872 - ?	
Wenceslao Velilla	? - April 1873	November 1875 - ?	
Higinio Uriarte	? - February 1876	April 1877	
José Falcón	? - May 1877	November 1878	
Adolfo Saguier	25 November 1878	8 September 1880	
José Toribio Iturburú	? - April 1881	July 1881 - ?	
Eusebio Bedoya	? - August 1881	October 1882	
Benito Escauriza	October 1882	November 1882	
Juan Antonio Jara	25 November 1882	25 November 1886	
José del Rosario Miranda	25 November 1886	25 November 1890	
Marcos Morínigo	25 November 1890	9 June 1894	
Patricio Escobar	9 June 1894	July 1894	
Bernardino Caballero	July 1894	November 1894	
Facundo Ynsfrán	25 November 1894	25 November 1898	
Andrés Héctor Carvallo	25 November 1898	9 January 1902	
Bernardino Caballero / Patricio Escobar	9 January 1902	25 November 1902	
Manuel Domínguez	25 November 1902	19 December 1904	
G. Benítez	19 December 1904	January 1905 - ?	
Antonio Taboada	? - April 1905	April 1905 - ?	
José Segundo Decoud	? - May 1905	November 1905 - ?	
Juan A. Aponte	? - December 1905	December 1905 - ?	
José Segundo Decoud / Antonio Taboada	? - April 1906	November 1906	
Emiliano González Navero	25 November 1906	4 July 1908	
Víctor M. Soler	? - January 1909	February 1909 - ?	
Héctor Velázquez	? - April 1909	April 1909	
Víctor M. Soler	April 1909	May 1909 - ?	
Juan Bautista Gaona	? - June 1909	January 1911	
Liberato Marcial Rojas	? - February 1911	July 1911	
Fernando A. Carreras	July 1911	October 1911 - ?	
Daniel Codas	? - January 1912	January 1912 - ?	
Pedro Bobadilla	15 August 1912	15 August 1916	
José Pedro Montero	15 August 1916	6 June 1919	
Gualberto Cardús Huerta	6 June 1919	July 1919 - ?	
Eduardo Schaerer	? - August 1919	January 1920 - ?	
Gerónimo Zubizarreta	? - April 1920	April 1920 - ?	
Eduardo Schaerer	? - May 1920	August 1920	
Félix Paiva	15 August 1920	29 October 1921	
Emiliano González Navero	? - May 1922	August 1922 - ?	
Belisario Rivarola	? - October 1923	December 1923 - ?	
Emiliano González Navero	? - May 1924	August 1924	
Manuel Burgos	15 August 1924	15 August 1928	
Emiliano González Navero	15 August 1928	25 October 1931	
Eusebio Ayala	25 October 1931	28 January 1932	
Emiliano González Navero	28 January 1932	15 August 1932	
Raúl Casal Ribeiro	15 August 1932	19 February 1936	
Justo Prieto	? - February 1939	June 1939 -	
Luis Alberto Riart	15 August 1939	18 February 1940	

== Presidents after 1968 ==
Below is a list of office-holders from 1968:

Name	Took office	Left office	Notes
Juan Ramón Chávez	1 April 1968	30 June 1988	
Ezequiel González Alsina	1 July 1988	6 February 1989	
Alberto Nogués	10 May 1989	30 June 1990	
Waldino Ramón Lovera	1 July 1990	30 June 1991	
Gustavo Díaz de Vivar	1 July 1991	30 June 1993	2 terms
Evelio Fernández Arévalos	1 July 1993	30 June 1995	2 terms
Milciades Rafael Casabianca	1 July 1995	30 June 1996	
Miguel Abdón Saguier	1 July 1996	30 June 1997	
Rodrigo Campos Servera	1 July 1997	30 June 1998	
Luis Ángel González Macchi	1 July 1998	28 March 1999	
Juan Carlos Galaverna Delvalle	28 March 1999	30 June 2000	
Juan Roque Galeano Villalba	1 July 2000	30 June 2002	2 terms
Juan Carlos Galaverna Delvalle	1 July 2002	30 June 2003	
Carlos Mateo Balmelli	1 July 2003	30 June 2004	
Miguel Carrizosa	1 July 2004	30 June 2005	
Carlos Filizzola	1 July 2005	30 June 2006	
Enrique González Quintana	1 July 2006	30 June 2007	
Miguel Abdón Saguier Carmona	1 July 2007	30 June 2008	
Enrique González Quintana	1 July 2008	30 June 2009	
Miguel Garrizosa Galiano	1 July 2009	30 June 2010	
Óscar Alberto González Daher	1 July 2010	30 June 2011	
Jorge Antonio Oviedo Matto	1 July 2011	30 June 2012	
Alfredo Luis Jaeggli Caballero	1 July 2012	30 June 2013	
Julio César Velázquez Tillería	1 July 2013	30 June 2014	
Blas Antonio Llano Ramos	1 July 2014	30 June 2015	
Mario Abdo Benítez	1 July 2015	30 June 2016	
Roberto Ramón Acevedo Quevedo	1 July 2016	30 June 2017	
Fernando Armindo Lugo Méndez	1 July 2017	30 June 2018	
Silvio Adalberto Ovelar Benítez	1 July 2018	30 June 2019	
Blas Antonio Llano Ramos	1 July 2019	30 June 2020	
Óscar Rubén Salomón	1 July 2020	30 June 2023	3 terms
Silvio Adalberto Ovelar Benítez	1 July 2023	1 July 2024	
Basilio Gustavo Núñez Giménez	1 July 2024	Incumbent	
