= Silvio Ovelar =

Paraguayan politician (born 1967)

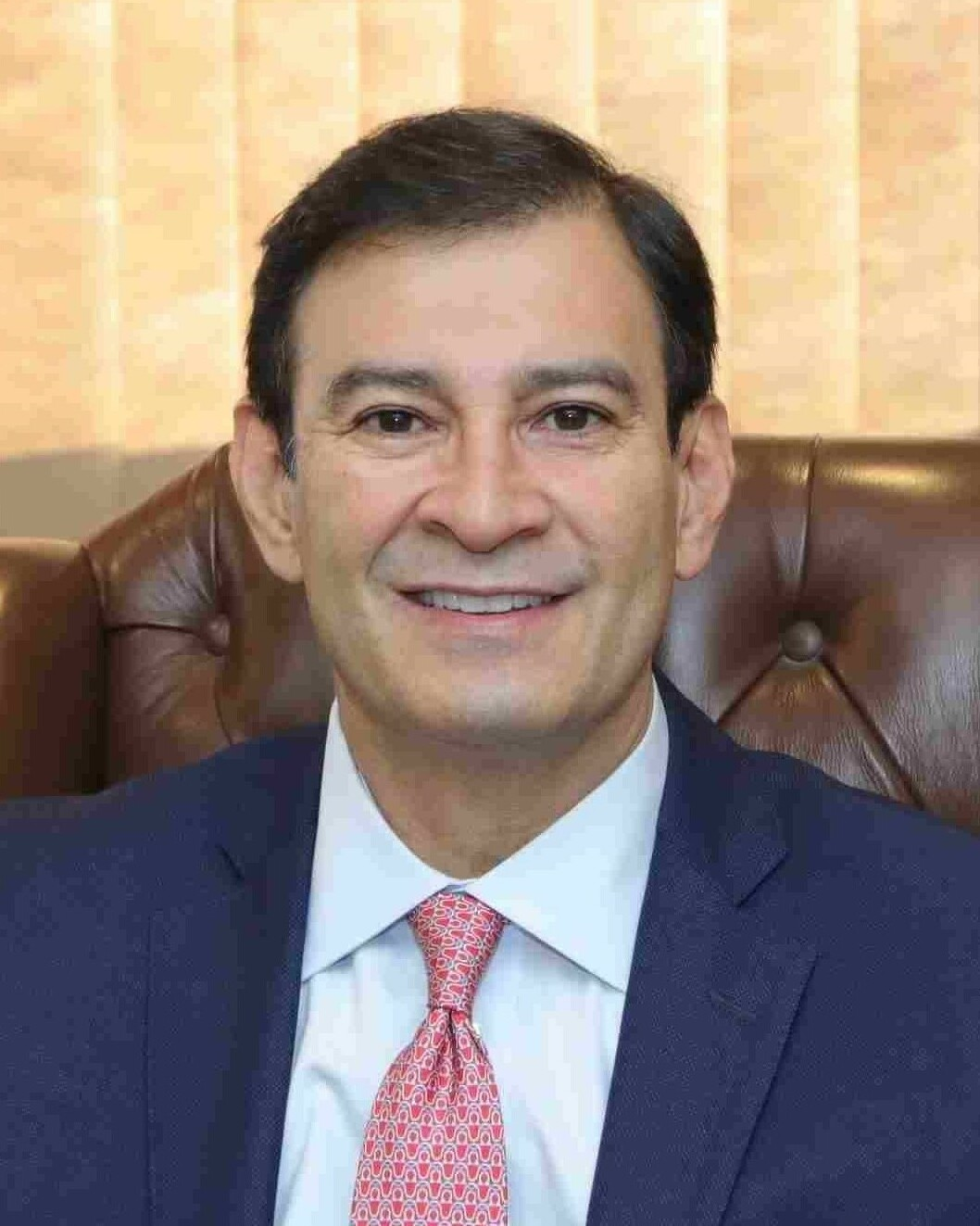
- Official portrait, 2023

Senator of Paraguay
- Incumbent
- Assumed office 5 August 2004

President of the Senate of Paraguay
- In office 30 June 2023 – 30 June 2024
- President: Mario Abdo Benítez; Santiago Peña
- Preceded by: Oscar Salomón
- Succeeded by: Basilio Núñez
- In office 30 June 2018 – 30 June 2019
- President: Horacio Cartes; Mario Abdo Benítez
- Preceded by: Fernando Lugo

Executive Minister-Secretary of Social Action
- In office 15 August 2003 – 3 August 2004
- President: Nicanor Duarte
- Preceded by: Aurelio Varela
- Succeeded by: María Ester Jiménez

Governor of Caaguazú
- In office 15 August 1998 – 15 August 2003
- Preceded by: Mario Soto
- Succeeded by: Enzo Vera

Personal details
- Born: Silvio Adalberto Ovelar Benítez; 20 November 1967 (age 58) Coronel Oviedo, Caaguazú, Paraguay
- Party: Colorado
- Spouse: Iris Magnolia Mendoza
- Children: 3
- Education: Catholic University of Asunción (BA)
- Occupation: Political scientist; politician

Silvio Adalberto "Beto" Ovelar Benítez (born 20 November 1967) is a Paraguayan politician who has served as senator since 2004. A member of the Colorado Party aligned with Horacio Cartes, he has served as president of the Senate from 2023 to 2024 and from 2018 to 2019.

Ovelar previously served as governor of Caaguazú from 1998 to 2003.

== Early life ==
=== Family ===
Silvio Adalberto Ovelar Benítez was born on 20 November 1967 in Coronel Oviedo, Caaguazú, to Silvio Ovelar Sr. and Hermelinda Benítez. He has five siblings: Gustavo, Robert, Hugo, Eber and Mariela.

Ovelar has three children and is currently married to Iris Magnolia Mendoza, a lawyer. His son with his ex-wife Lidia Alicia Ayala, Alejandro, has been the subject of controversy, being accused of benefiting from nepotism.

=== Education ===
Ovelar studied political science at the Catholic University of Asunción. He also studied law there, but did not graduate.

== Political career ==
Ovelar started his political career at an early age, being elected president of the Colorado Youth in 1992. In 1994, he was elected president of one of the seccionales (local headquarters of the Colorado Party) of Coronel Oviedo, his hometown.

In 1998, Ovelar was elected governor of Caaguazú, serving until his term expired in 2003.

=== Senator (2004-) ===
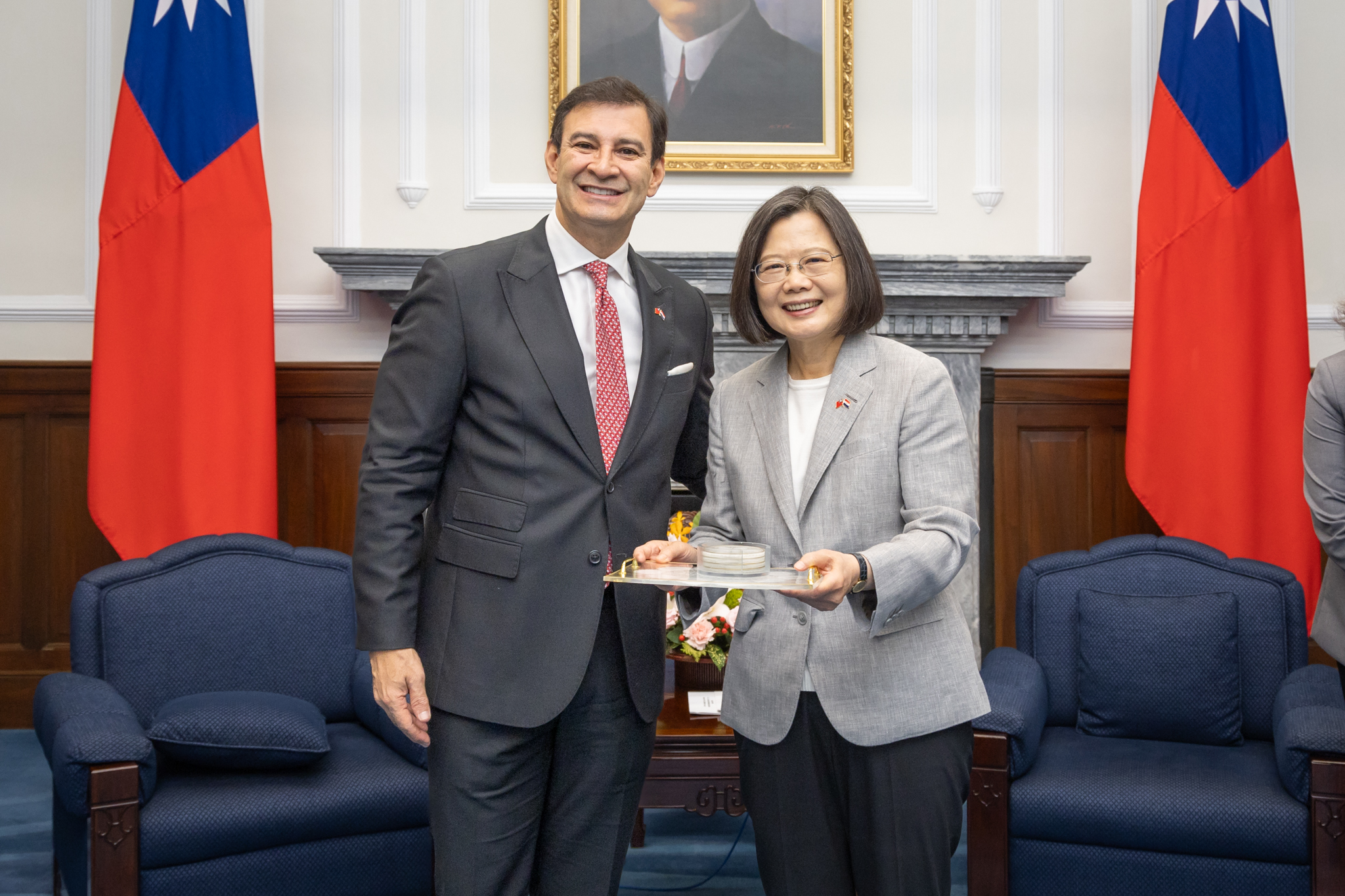
Ovelar alongside Taiwanese President Tsai Ing-wen in 2024.

In 2003, after his term as governor of Caaguazú ended, Ovelar was appointed substitute senator. A year later, in 2004, Ovelar officially became a senator, filling the vacant seat of Ana María Figueredo, who resigned. Ovelar was elected to a term of his own in 2008.

During his 2013 electoral campaign he was filmed buying votes from Colorado party voters and "renting" identity cards from Liberal party voters. After being reelected in 2013 and 2018, Ovelar was elected by his peers to the office of president of the Senate, succeeding Fernando Lugo. Ovelar held the office until 2019, when he was replaced by Blas Llano. After being reelected again in 2023, Ovelar was once again elected by his peers to the presidency of the Senate, office he currently holds.
