= Leticia Ocampos =

First Lady of Paraguay (2023–2026)

First Lady of Paraguay
- In role 15 August 2023 – 6 November 2026
- President: Santiago Peña
- Preceded by: Silvana López Moreira
- Succeeded by: Fabiana Maria Souto

Personal details
- Born: Leticia Ocampos Villate; 2 July 1980 (age 46) Asunción, Paraguay
- Spouse: Santiago Peña (m. 1997)
- Children: 2
- Occupation: Architect

Leticia Ocampos Villate (born 2 July 1980) is a Paraguayan architect and former First Lady of Paraguay. She is married to Santiago Peña, who was the president of Paraguay from 2023 to 2026.

== Biography ==
Ocampos was born into an upper-middle-class home and always lived with her parents Teresa Villate Garcete and Carlos Ocampos Zelada.

She married Santiago Peña in 1997, when she was 17 years old. At the age of 18 she had her first child and years later her daughter was born. She studied classical dance until she traveled with her husband to New York to study a master's degree at Columbia University, where they lived for two years. Upon their return, she worked at her father's construction company.

She is a Catholic and describes herself as a follower of Padre Pio, and together with her husband they go to church every Sunday.

Ocampos has been very active on social media since her husband's entry into politics, sharing pictures with her husband in political campaigns and with her children.

In her photos, Ocampos is seen dressed usually in Paraguayan traditional clothes, with prints and touches of ñandutí.

She accompanied her husband to and often gave speeches at political rallies. In one particular political rally, Ocampos promised that she would give priority to the family, assuring that her husband would "guarantee education, health and decent work for all."

At the inauguration of her husband, he used a Bible that was gifted to them on their wedding day in 1997 for his swearing-in, describing it as a symbol of the union that both will have during the government that would begin.

Honorary titles
Preceded by Silvana López Moreira	First Lady of Paraguay; 2023–2026	Succeeded by Fabiana Maria Souto
