= Nelly Reig Castellanos =

First Lady of Paraguay (1929–2021)

First Lady of Paraguay
- In office 3 February 1989 – 15 August 1993
- President: Andrés Rodríguez
- Preceded by: Ligia Stroessner
- Succeeded by: María Teresa Carrasco

Personal details
- Born: Nélida Reig Castellanos; 3 March 1929 Paraguay
- Died: 15 May 2021 (aged 92) Asunción, Paraguay
- Spouse: Andrés Rodríguez (m. 1949; died 1997)
- Children: Dolly Rodriguez Reig; Mirtha Rodriguez Reig; Martha Rodriguez Reig

Nélida "Nelly" Reig Castellanos de Rodríguez, also known as Ña Nelly, (3 March 1929 – 15 May 2021) was the First Lady of Paraguay from February 1989 to August 1992 during the presidency of her husband, Andrés Rodríguez, who overthrew the Alfredo Stroessner dictatorship in the 1989 Paraguayan coup d'état. Reig was the Paraguay's first First Lady during the transition to democracy following the end of El Stronato.

== Biography ==
Reig was born in Paraguay on 3 March 1929. Her mother was Paraguayan, while her father was Spanish. Reig was known as "Ña Nelly" to family and friends.

She met her future husband, Andrés Rodríguez, a Paraguayan Army officer, when she was 18 years old. She accompanied him during the Paraguayan Civil War of 1947. The couple married in 1949 and had three daughters namely Dolly, Mirtha and Martha. One of their daughters, Martha, later married Alfredo Stroessner Mora, the son of Paraguayan dictator, President Alfredo Stroessner.

In 1989, Reig's husband, General Andrés Rodríguez led a coup, which ousted the 35-year dictatorship of Alfredo Stroessner. Rodríguez assumed the presidency, making Nelly Reig Castellanos first lady during the democratic transition. She served in the role from 1989 until 1992. Former President died in 1997.

Reig received an award in 2011 to mark the 22nd anniversary of the 1989 Paraguayan coup d'état and the end of the Stroessner dictatorship. Perhaps surprisingly, Reig expressed dissatisfaction in the country's democratic governance at the time, saying that the democratic administrations that succeeded her husband were disappointing "...because it is not what we expected."

In May 2021, Reig was hospitalized in the intensive care unit of Centro Medico La Costa in Asunción due to pre-existing health conditions. She was not diagnosed with COVID-19, according to news reports. Her condition continued to deteriorate. Nelly Reig Castellanos died shortly after her release at her home in the Carmelitas neighborhood (Las Lomas) neighborhood of Asunción in the early hours of 15 May 2021, at the age of 92.

Reig's viewing was held at her home in Carmelitas, the Nuestra Señora del Carmen church in Asunción, and San Raphael, in accordance with COVID-19 restrictions at the time. Her funeral was held in the Recoleta neighborhood of Asunción.
