= Silvana López Moreira =

First Lady of Paraguay (2018–2023)

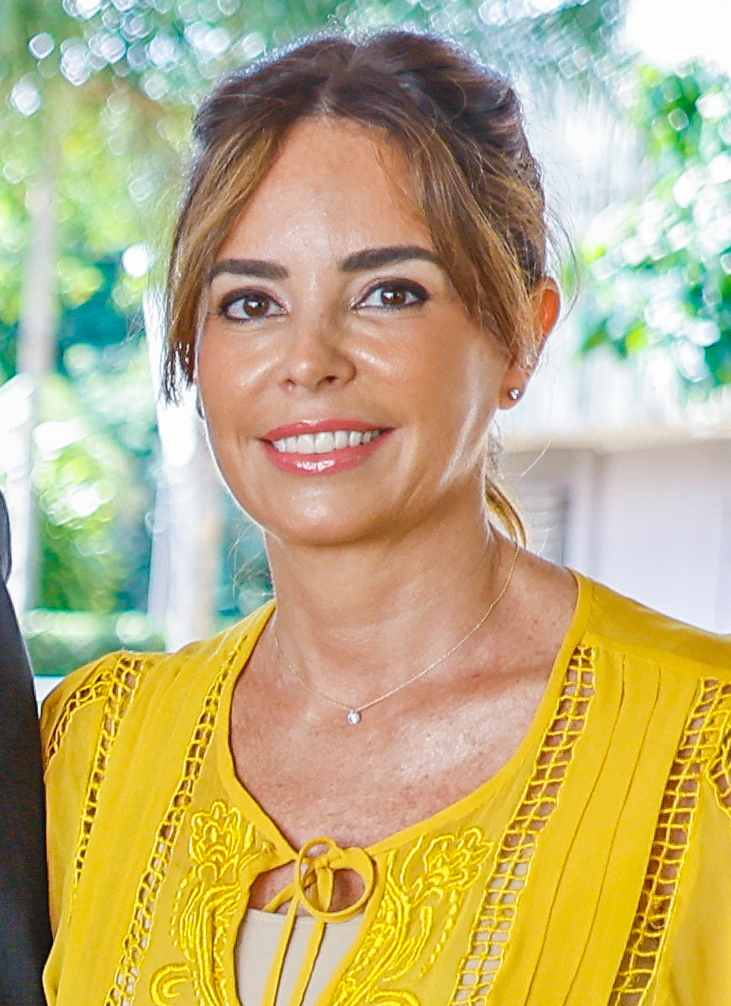
- López Moreira in 2023

First Lady of Paraguay
- In office 15 August 2018 – 15 August 2023
- President: Mario Abdo Benítez
- Preceded by: Emilia Alfaro (2013)
- Succeeded by: Leticia Ocampos

Personal details
- Born: Silvana López Moreira Bó; 31 January 1974 (age 52) Asunción, Paraguay
- Spouse(s): José Félix Ugarte (divorced) Mario Abdo Benítez (m. 2007)
- Children: 4
- Parent(s): Néstor López Moreira; Rossana Bó

Silvana López Moreira Bó (born 31 January 1974) is a former First Lady of Paraguay, from 15 August 2018 to 15 August 2023, due to her marriage to President Mario Abdo Benítez. With López Moreira, the office of First Lady was reopened in Paraguay after a vacant period, since the previous President, Horacio Cartes, ordered its closure due to being divorced.

== Personal life ==
Silvana López Moreira comes from a wealthy family, daughter of Néstor López Moreira and Rossana Bó. López Moreira's maternal grandfather is businessman Nicolás Bó, who amassed his fortune during the regime of the late Paraguayan dictator Alfredo Stroessner, and owned media companies and various other businesses. López Moreira's first cousin, model Gabriela Bó, had a brief marriage with Mexican singer Cristian Castro.

López Moreira's first marriage was to wealthy cattle rancher José Félix Ugarte (circa 1990s), with whom she had three children, two sons and a daughter. In 2007, she married politician and later President of Paraguay Mario Abdo Benítez. He was her teenage sweetheart when both attended the San Andrés High School in Asunción. They have a son.

López Moreira had a sister who, alongside her husband and their three children, died in the 2021 Surfside condominium collapse.

== Education ==
López Moreira studied at the San Andrés High School in Asunción, and her university studies were carried out at the Polytechnic and Artistic University of Paraguay, where she obtained a degree in Public Relations. She also obtained a degree in Marketing, at the Universidad Americana.

== First Lady of Paraguay ==
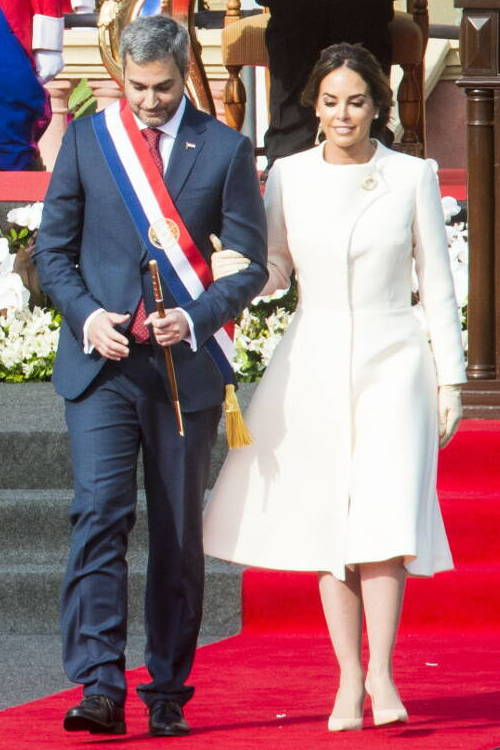
López Moreira alongside her husband Mario Abdo Benítez during his inauguration

López Moreira was noted for her fashion sense during her husband's inauguration, wearing a dress made out of ñandutí (a typical handmade fabric of Paraguay), embroidered by weavers from Itauguá, a city known for its production of the fabric. Spanish magazine ¡Hola! reported that on Paraguayan newspapers, ABC Color compared her to Jacqueline Kennedy Onassis and Michelle Obama, and Última Hora considered her appearance "impeccable", while ¡Hola! itself compared López Moreira's appearance to Juliana Awada, wife of Argentine President Mauricio Macri. Other media also compared her to Queen Letizia of Spain, with Spanish newspaper El Mundo referring to her, on occasion of a November 2022 visit to Spain alongside her husband, as "the Paraguayan Letizia".

In February 2019, it was informed that López Moreira had contracted dengue fever during the 2019–2020 dengue fever epidemic, after her husband, President Adbo Benítez, had been infected the previous month.

In July 2020, it was announced that López Moreira would debut as a television presenter in a television program aimed to support entrepreneurs during the COVID-19 pandemic in Paraguay, named Aikuaa ("I know" in Guarani language), to be broadcast on the state-run public broadcasting channel Paraguay TV, as well as on social media.

Honorary titles
Preceded by Emilia Alfaro	First Lady of Paraguay; 2018–2023	Succeeded by Leticia Ocampos
