= Juan Gualberto González =

President of Paraguay (1851–1912)

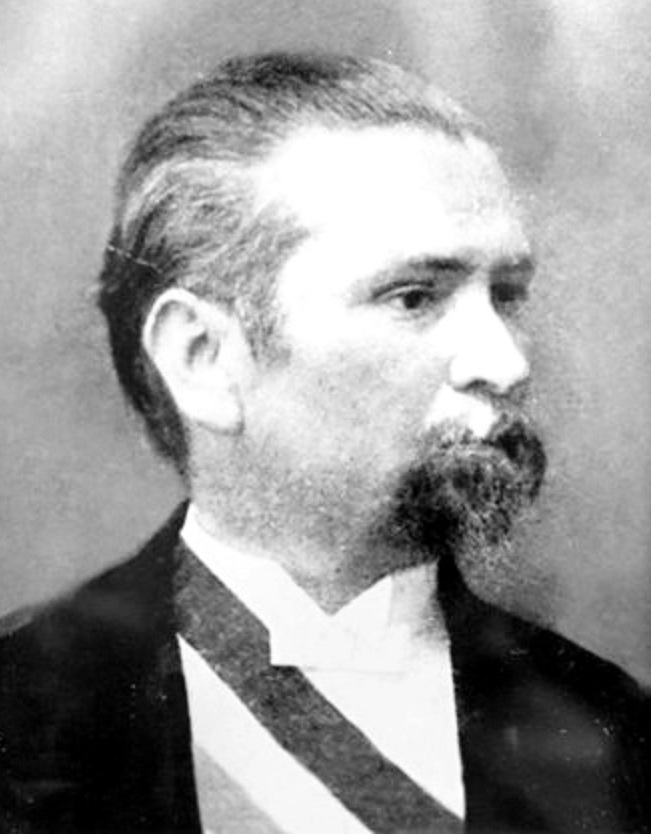
- Portrait, 1890

11th President of Paraguay
- In office November 25, 1890 – June 9, 1894
- Vice President: Marcos Morínigo
- Preceded by: Patricio Escobar
- Succeeded by: Marcos Morínigo

Personal details
- Born: July 12, 1851 Asunción, Paraguay
- Died: July 30, 1912 (age 61) Asunción, Paraguay
- Party: Colorado
- Spouse: Rosa Peña Guanes

Juan Gualberto González (July 12, 1851 – July 30, 1912) was the President of Paraguay and served from 1890 until his forced resignation in 1894.

== Life ==
Juan Gualberto González was born in Asunción on July 12, 1851. He married with teacher Rosa Peña Guanez, daughter of Rosario Guanes and Manuel Pedro Peña.

When the War of the Triple Alliance took place, he offered his services and joined the Health Department in the Army. He was taken prisoner, along with Juan Bautista Gill, and enlisted in the army of the allies. He returned to Asunción in 1869, two years later he joined the masonry, in the Paraguayan Union Lodge No. 30. After some time he became one of the founders of the Supreme Council Grade 33, this institution extolled him in this position on July 8, 1895, with Eleuterio Correo, Antonio Taboada and Cecilio Báez. He died in Asunción, on July 30, 1912.

== Presidency ==
He was President of the republic between November 25, 1890 and June 9, 1894. The Vice-President was Marcos Morínigo and his cabinet had: José Tomás Sosa, as Minister of the Department of Interior, Venancio V. López (grandson of Carlos Antonio López and nephew of Marshal López) in the Foreign Office, José Segundo Decoud in Treasury; Benjamín Aceval in the Justice Department and General Juan B. Egusquiza in War and Navy.

During his government the banking crisis that the previous administration declared became bigger. The Office of Direct Contribution (Real Estate Taxes) was created and also the Municipality of Asunción. The Bishop Pedro Juan Aponte died. The Practical School of Agriculture, the Palace of Government was inaugurated with a great exposition in commemoration of the Fourth Centenary of the America's Discovery; the building of the Public Jail was finished, also the building of the Caridad Hospital and the Mercantile Bank was created. On October 18, 1891 a coup against his government failed but left a precedent in Paraguayan history. In 1891 he left Ex-Chancellor Colonel Juan Crisóstomo Centurión with plenipotentiary power in front of the governments of the United Kingdom, France and Spain; that year the diplomatic mission of the Bolivian representative Mariano Baptista failed.

In 1892 the first military scholarships were granted and a Practical School of Agriculture was created. In October of the same year started to operate the Law of Secondary and Superior Education, which was very important at the time. In May 1893 the Faculty of Notaries and Public Court Clerks. On July 16 the first Doctors in Law and Social Sciences graduated in a solemn ceremony, they were: Emeterio González, Cecilio Báez and Gaspar J. Villamayor, the sponsor was Ramón Zubizarreta.

On April 2, 1891 Facundo Insfrán was appointed Minister of the Justice Department in place of Benjamín Aceval. The Argentine Code of Commerce was adopted in Paraguay, the Palace of López was repaired, many new colonies were founded and 1723 immigrants arrived. The train tracks reached Pirapó in August 1891, close to Yuty and the public spending was about 314,615.23 pesos. There were 292 schools with 18,944 students. The national budget was settled in 1,226,000.00 pesos for 1893.

José Segundo Decoud was appointed as Paraguayan representative in Uruguay and Brazil, César Gondra in the Vatican and Juan Durán y Cuervo in Spain.

The newspapers: "La Democracia" (The Democracy) and "El Independiente" (The Independent) were created in 1891, "La República" (The Republic), "La Libertad" (The Liberty), "El Pueblo" (The People), "El Centinela" (The Guard) and "La Patria" (The Fatherland).

== Deposition ==
González was supposed to give power to his brother-in-law José Segundo Decoud, but on the morning of June 9, 1894, because of political disagreements, a delegation that included Rufino Mazó, Eusebio Mongelós and Rufino Careaga came to his office and in the name of General Egusquiza asked him to resign. When González refused, he was taken to the army barracks, where Egusquiza and General Caballero awaited him. González refused quitting again, but the Congress ended up giving the presidency to Vice-President Marcos Morínigo.

== Political career ==
He was adjutant in the Health Department during the War of Paraguay against the Triple Alliance. He was magistrate and President of the Chamber of Deputies. On June 26, 1869 he became founder member of the "Club del Pueblo". In 1872 he was examining magistrate in commerce. In 1873 he was named Public Defender. In 1887 he was a founding member of the "Asociación Nacional Republicana" (Republican National Association). He was President of the Council of Public Credits and was in charge of the Justice Department.

Political offices
Preceded by Patricio Escobar	President of Paraguay; 1890–1894	Succeeded by Marcos Moríñigo
