= Las Lomas (Asunción) =

- Barrio
- Interactive map of Las Lomas
- Country: Paraguay
- City: Asunción

Las Lomas (also known as Carmelitas) is a neighbourhood (barrio) of Asunción, Paraguay.
