= Oscar Salomón (politician) =

Paraguayan politician

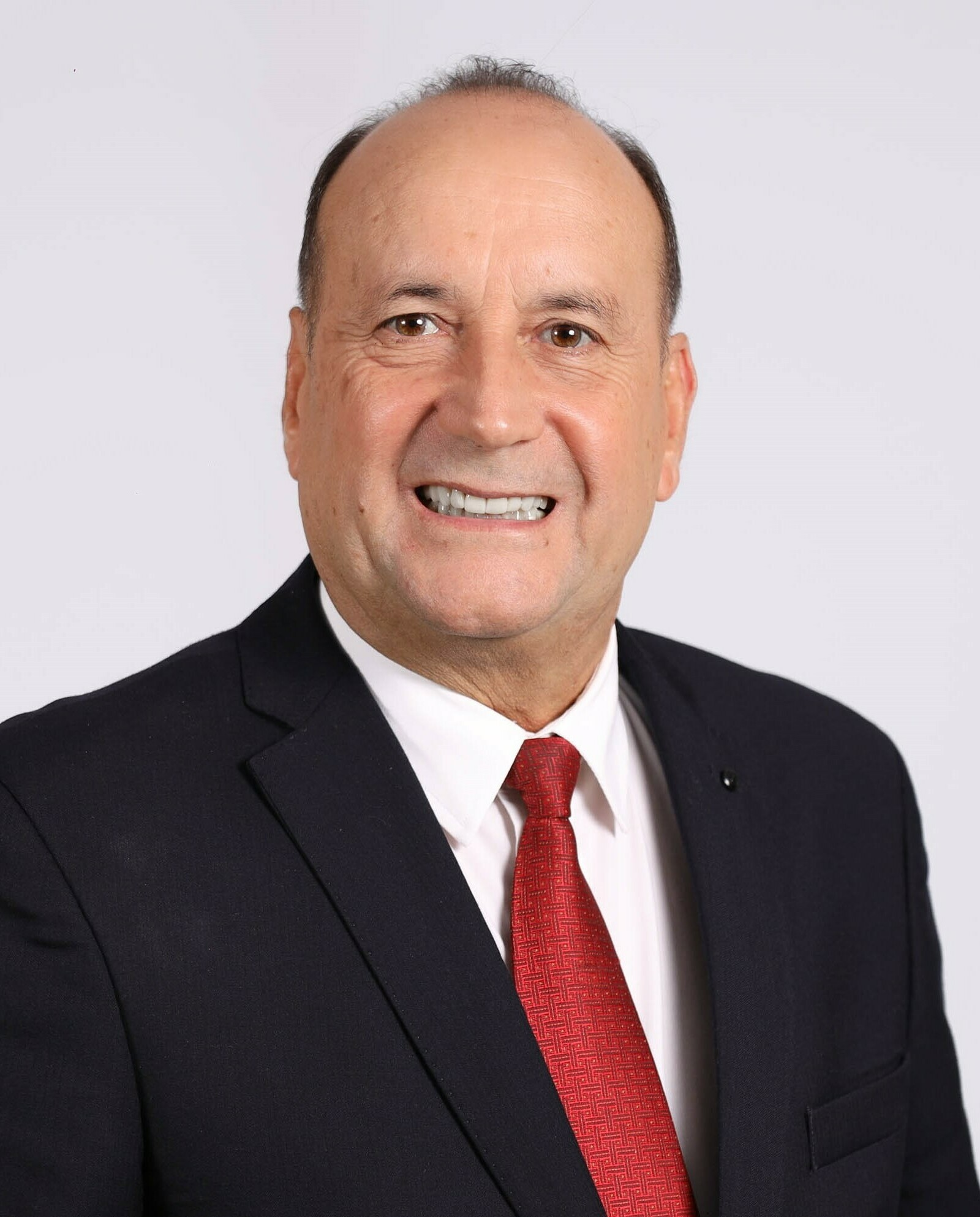
- Official portrait, 2023

Senator of Paraguay
- Incumbent
- Assumed office 30 June 2013

President of the Senate of Paraguay
- In office 1 July 2020 – 30 June 2023
- Preceded by: Blas Llano
- Succeeded by: Silvio Ovelar

Personal details
- Born: Oscar Rubén Salomón Fernández; June 3, 1957 (age 68)
- Party: Colorado Party
- Spouse: Gloria Núñez
- Children: 4
- Occupation: Businessman; politician
- Nickname: Cachito

Oscar Rubén Salomón Fernández is Paraguayan businessman and politician, currently serving as senator since 2013.

He previously served as President of the Senate of Paraguay from 2020 to 2023.

== Personal life ==
He was born on 3 June 1957 and he served as a member of the Senate of Paraguay from 2013 to 2023. He is a member of Colorado Party. He was a member of the Chamber of Deputies of Paraguay three terms 1993–1998, 1998-2003 and 2003–2008. He was also President of the Chamber of Deputies of Paraguay from 2004 to 2005 and from 2007 to 2008.
