= Mburuvicha Róga =

Building in Asunción, Paraguay

Coordinates: 25.2931°S 57.6011°W

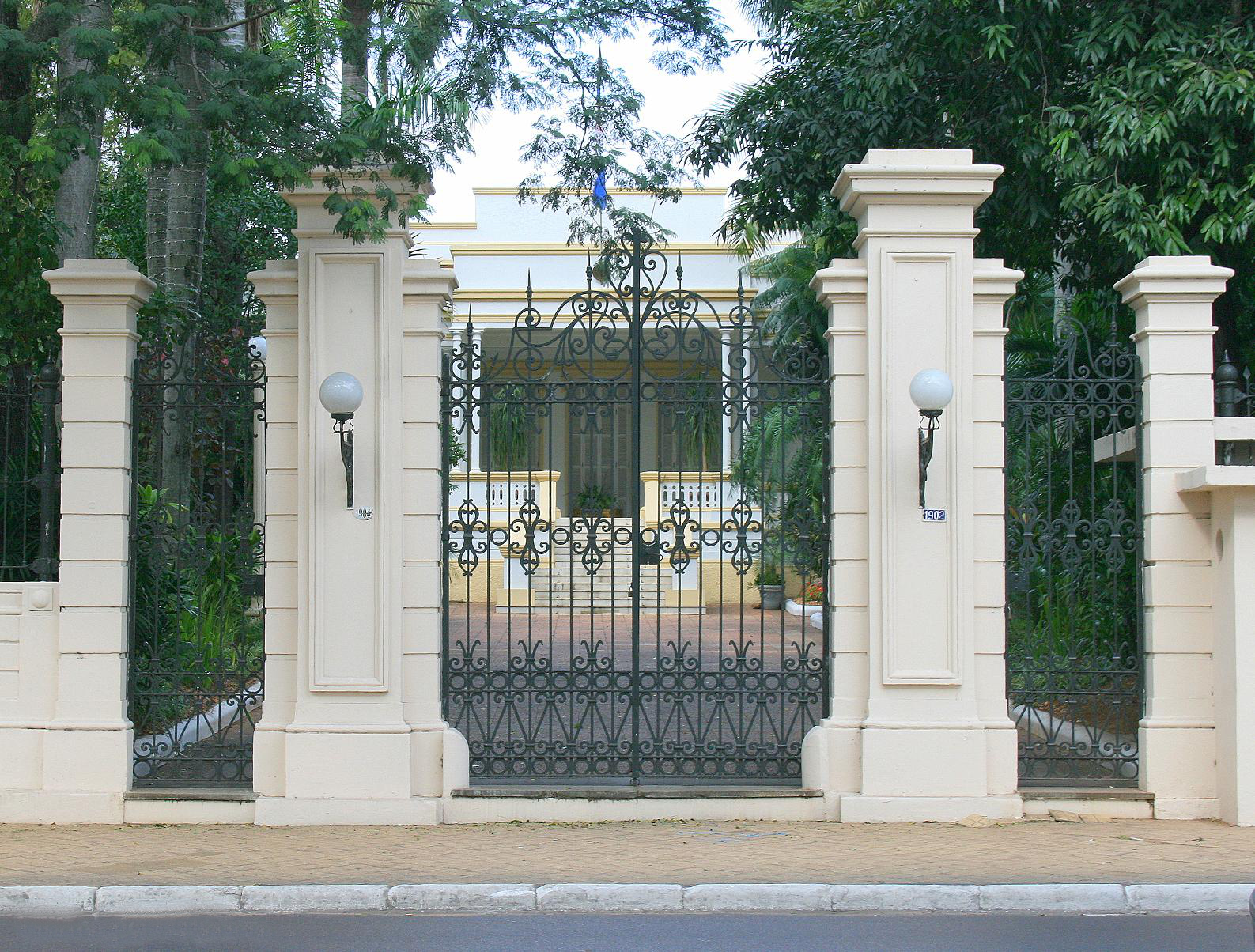
Mburuvicha Róga palace as seen from outside one of its main entrances

Mburuvicha Róga (Guarani, lit. 'House of the Chief') is a building in Asunción, Paraguay. It serves as the official residence for the President and First Lady of Paraguay, and is also the official headquarters of the Office of the First Lady of the Nation.

The complex was built in 1930, and it is composed of the house along 20 hectares of gardens.

The original expression referred to the house of a Guaraní chief. Later, the name was adapted to mean the house of the President of the Republic. As Mburuvicha means "chief", the expression could be expanded to mean the house of the highest official in a particular social setting.
