= Carlos Mateo Balmelli =

Paraguayan politician (born 1961)

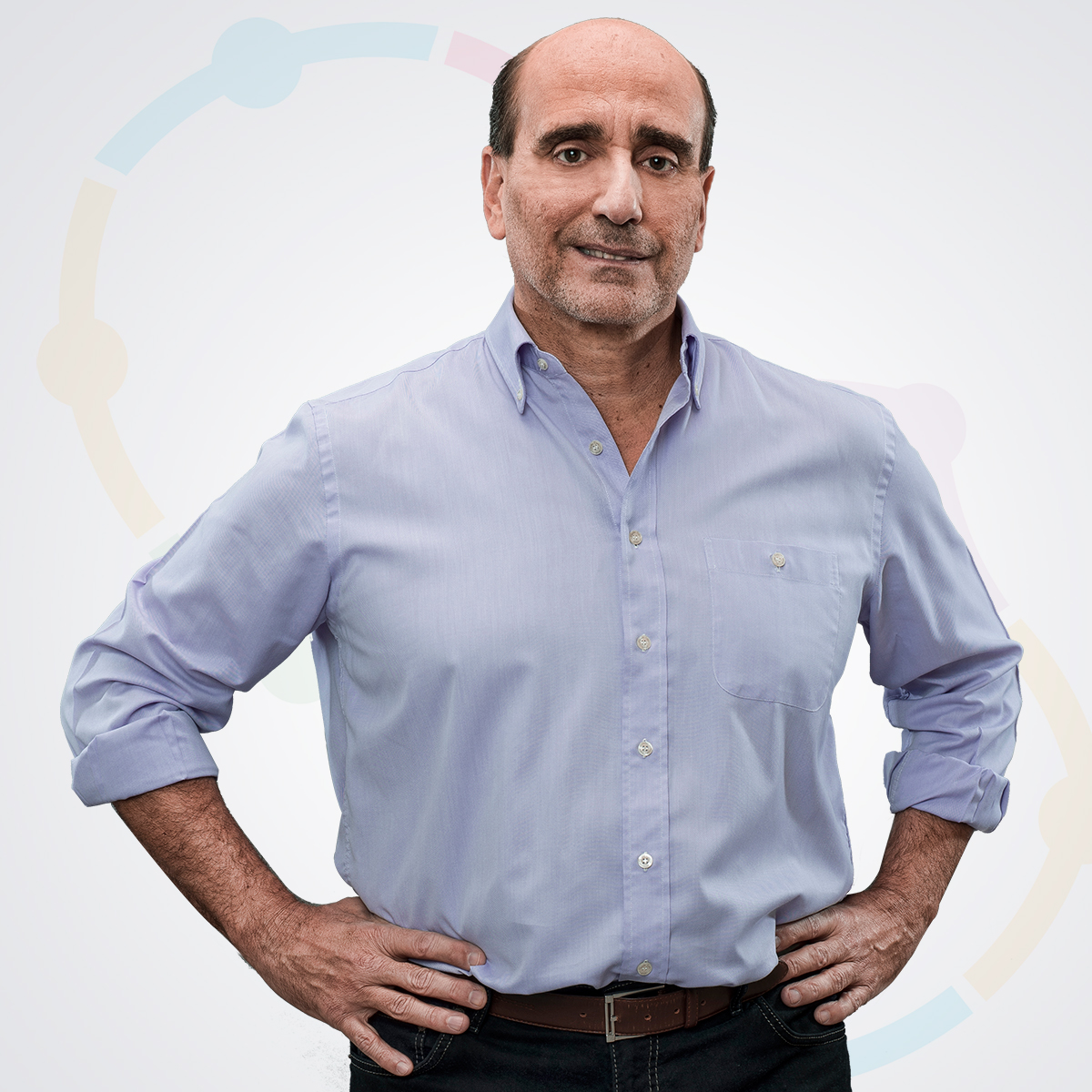
Carlos Mateo Balmelli in 2017

Carlos Mateo Balmelli (born 9 January 1961 in Asunción) was a Paraguayan politician, who is the former President of the Senate of Paraguay. He belongs to the Authentic Radical Liberal Party.
