= José del Rosario Miranda =

Paraguayan politician (1832–1903)

José del Rosario Miranda Roa
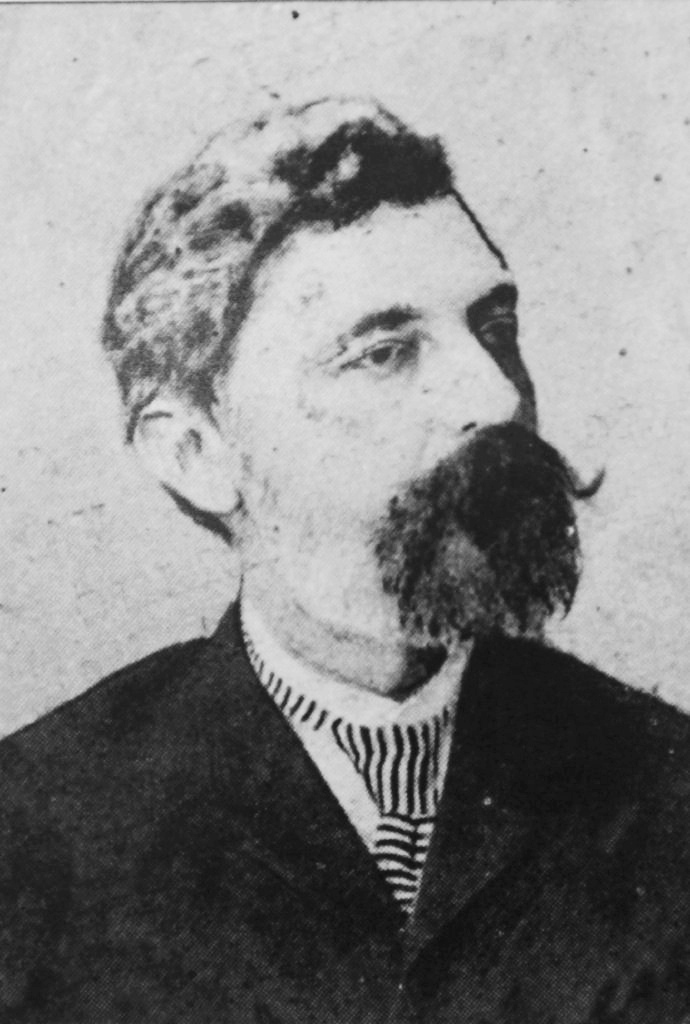

Vice President of Paraguay
- In office 25 November 1886 – 25 November 1890
- President: Patricio Escobar
- Preceded by: Juan Antonio Jara
- Succeeded by: Marcos Morínigo

Personal details
- Born: 1832 Caraguatay, Paraguay
- Died: 26 May 1903 (aged 70–71)
- Party: Colorado

José del Rosario Miranda Roa (1832 - 26 May 1903) was a Paraguayan politician and Vice President of Paraguay between 1886 and 1890 from Colorado party.

Miranda joined in the army and participated in the War of Triple Alliance. In the postwar period, he was one of the protagonists of the national reconstruction. He was elected to constituent assembly and later presided over the judiciary of Paraguay.

Miranda held ministerial positions in the government of President Salvador Jovellanos (War and Navy, Foreign Relations, Justice, Worship and Public Instruction); He also acted in diplomacy for the final arrangement of peace and border treaties with Argentina, and as a representative to the Holy See. He was also a member of the Congress and chaired the Chamber of Deputies.

Miranda was elected as Vice President of Paraguay for the tern 1886-1890 as a running mate of Patricio Escobar. Later he was elected to the Senate of Paraguay. He died on 26 May 1903.
