= Patricio Escobar =

President of Paraguay (1843–1912)

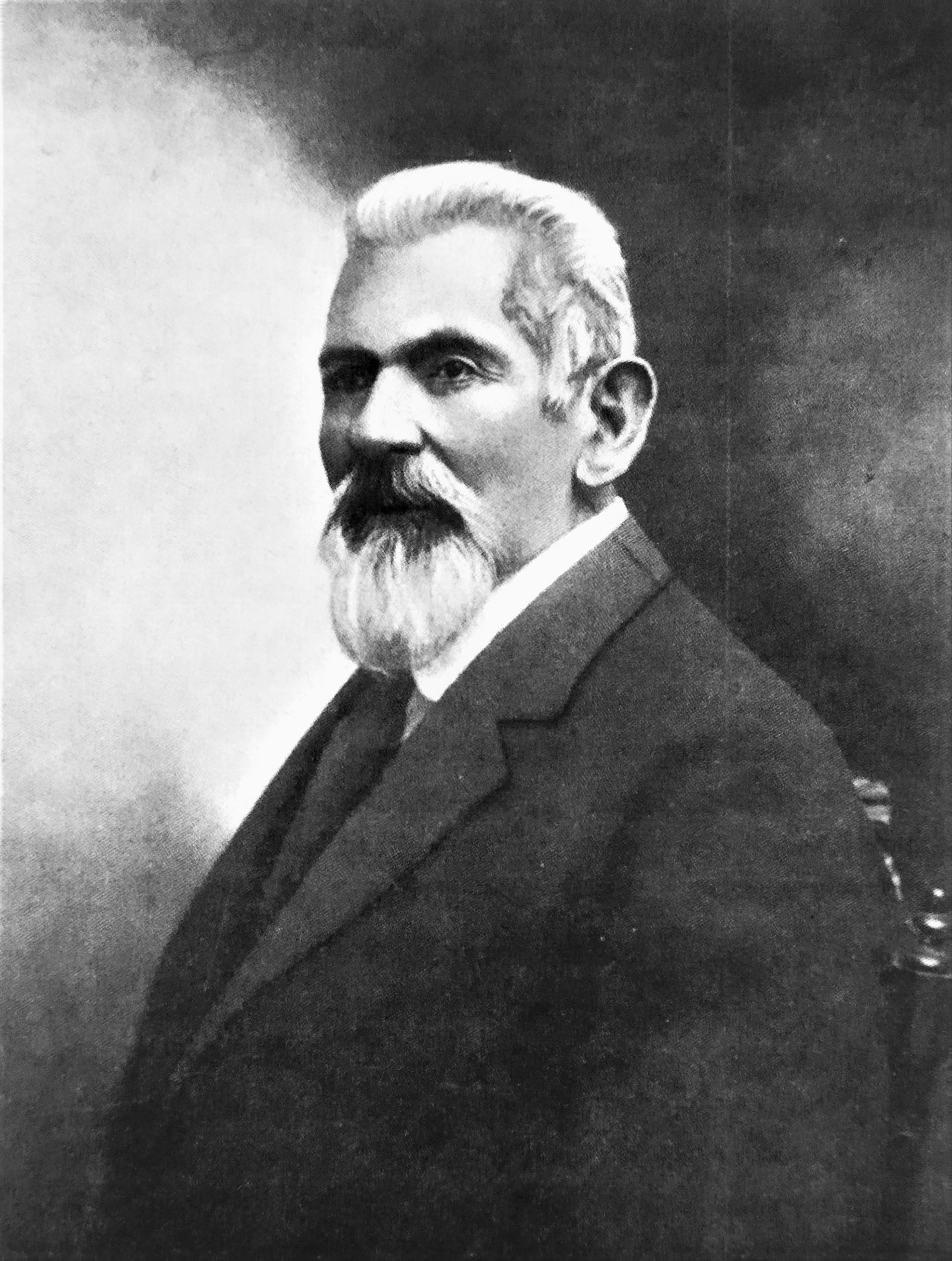

10th President of Paraguay
- In office 25 November 1886 – 25 November 1890
- Vice President: José del Rosario Miranda
- Preceded by: Bernardino Caballero
- Succeeded by: Juan Gualberto González

Personal details
- Born: 17 March 1843 San José de los Arroyos, Paraguay
- Died: 19 April 1912 (aged 69) Asunción, Paraguay
- Party: Colorado

Patricio Escobar (March 17, 1843 – April 19, 1912) was President of Paraguay between November 25, 1886, and November 25, 1890.

== His life ==
Escobar was born in San José de los Arroyos on March 17, 1843. His parents were José Escobar and Ana Bella Cáceres. He was first married with Ignacia Garcete, and later in his life with Estalación E. General Escobar was a hero in the War of Paraguay against the Triple Alliance.

He was inducted as a private in the Cerro León mustering ground, later joining the Infantry Battalion No. 36. He was promoted to first officer in May 1866 and second lieutenant after the battle in Curupayty. He was adjutant of Marshal López in 1867 in the Headquarters of Paso Pucú. He was made a Colonel before the Battle of Cerro Corá. He was assigned difficult missions because of his calm demeanour and caution.

His body reflected his actions in war, since he was covered in scars. He was imprisoned by the enemies, but after being freed he went back immediately to the army. During his government, Salvador Jovellanos promoted Escobar to Brigadier General on July 16, 1874 and Juan B. Gill promoted him to Major General, on July 6, 1876.

== His government ==
Escobar assumed the presidency on November 25, 1886. He started his government with three military men and two civilians. His vice-president was José del Rosario Miranda and his cabinet was formed by Agustín Cañete, Higinio Uriarte and José Tomás Sosa in Treasury; Juan Antonio Meza and Manuel A. Maciel in the Department of Interior, Manuel A. Maciel and César Gondra in the Justice Department; Pedro Duarte in War and Navy; and Benjamín Aceval, José Segundo Decoud, Juan Crisóstomo Centurión and José Tomás Sosa in the State Department.

During his government the Democratic Center, the Liberal Party (Blue) and the Colorado Party (Red) were founded. On October 24, 1887 the National Council of Education was created. Was enacted the law of obligatory primary education, the Paraguayan teacher Atanasio Riera, graduated in Corrientes and writer of “Primera memoria sobre Educación común” (First memories about Common Education), returned to the country. That same year the treaty Aceval-Tamayo, with Bolivia was signed, the Agricultural Bank and the Official Newspaper were created.

On July 20, 1888 the Law School was re-opened and on September 11 the professor, writer and Argentine ex-president Domingo Faustino Sarmiento, who collaborated in the creation of new educative plans, died. In 1890 Adela and Celsa Speratti returned to the country after their exile and organized the School of Teachers.

General Escobar gave special importance to the development of education as a sign of progress for the country. On September 24, 1889 the National University was founded and two years before that the National Library. Paraguay participated in the First International American Conference, organized in Washington, and the Bank of Paraguay was created. The law that established the purposes and conditions of the secondary teaching was approved and public schools were created in Villa Rica, Encarnación, Pilar and Concepción. The rail tracks were extended from Paraguarí to Villa Rica, hiring the Company Patri, Travassos and Cía. for the purpose; later the work was given to an English company. Electricity was also installed in the country for the first time.

He served as President of the Senate in 1894 and in 1902. He died in his home on April 19, 1912.

Political offices
Preceded by Bernardino Caballero	President of Paraguay; 1886–1890	Succeeded by Juan Gualberto González
