= Facundo Ynsfrán =

Paraguayan politician (1860–1902)

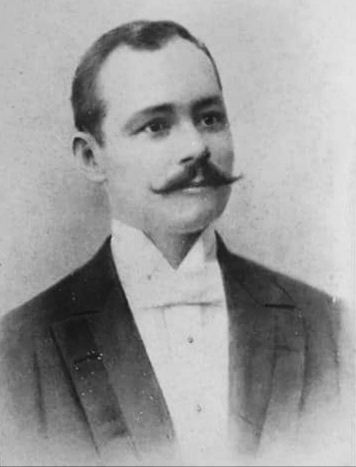

8th Vice President of Paraguay
- In office 25 November 1894 – 25 November 1898
- President: Juan Bautista Egusquiza
- Preceded by: Marcos Morínigo
- Succeeded by: Andrés Héctor Carvallo

Personal details
- Born: Facundo Ynsfrán Caballero; 27 November 1860
- Died: 9 January 1902 (aged 41)
- Party: Colorado Party

Dr. Facundo Ynsfrán Caballero (27 November 1860 – 9 January 1902) was Vice President of Paraguay from 1894 to 1898. He had previously served in Congress and founded Paraguay's School of Medicine. He was killed during an anti-Aceval tumult in Parliament on 9 January 1902.

Political offices
Preceded by Marcos Morínigo	Vice President of Paraguay; 1894–1898	Succeeded by Andrés Héctor Carvallo
