= Mario Abdo Benítez =

President of Paraguay from 2018 to 2023

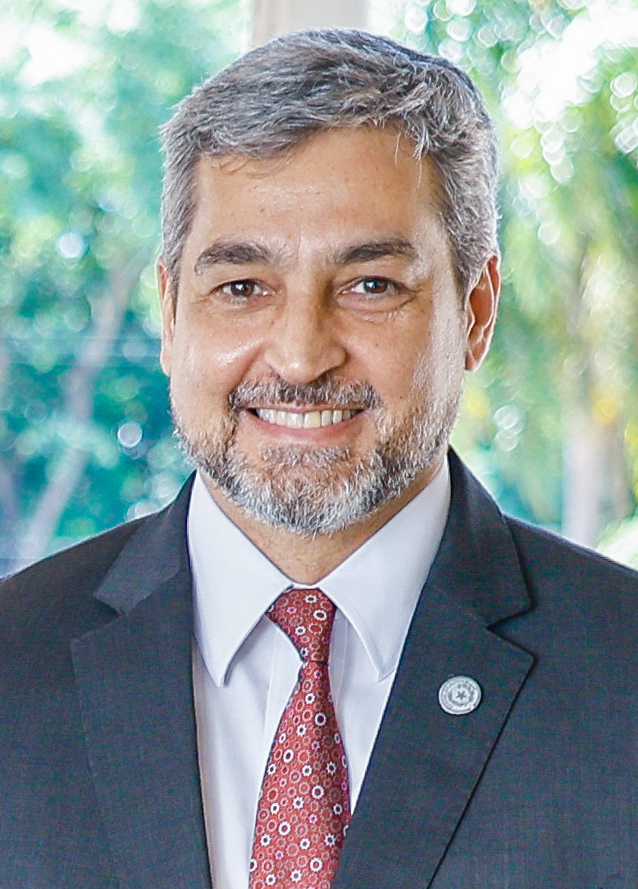
- Abdo Benítez in 2023

51st President of Paraguay
- In office 15 August 2018 – 15 August 2023
- Vice President: Hugo Velázquez
- Preceded by: Horacio Cartes
- Succeeded by: Santiago Peña

President of the Senate of Paraguay
- In office 1 July 2015 – 30 June 2016
- Preceded by: Blas Llano
- Succeeded by: Roberto Acevedo Penedo

Senator of the Republic
- Life Tenure
- Assumed office 15 August 2023 Serving with Juan Carlos Wasmosy
- Constituency: President of Paraguay
- In office 1 July 2013 – 1 March 2018
- Constituency: National Direct Election

Personal details
- Born: 10 November 1971 (age 55) Asunción, Paraguay
- Party: Colorado
- Spouse(s): Fátima Díaz (divorced) Silvana López Moreira (m. 2007)
- Children: 3
- Education: Post University
- Nickname: Marito

Military service
- Branch/service: Armed Forces of Paraguay; Paraguayan Air Force
- Years of service: 1989–early 1990s
- Rank: Second lieutenant

Mario Abdo Benítez (Spanish pronunciation: [ˈmaɾjo ˈaβðo‿βeˈnites]; born 10 November 1971) is a Paraguayan politician who served as the 51st president of Paraguay from 2018 to 2023. He was previously a senator and served as president of the Senate of Paraguay from 2015 to 2016.

== Early life and education ==
Abdo Benítez was born in Asunción on 10 November 1971 and is the son of Ruth Benítez Perrier and Mario Abdo Benítez Sr. His father's ancestry is Lebanese. His father one of the four so-called "Cuatrinomio de Oro" (the Golden Four) politicians who were deemed to be closest to then-President Alfredo Stroessner, who ruled Paraguay for 35 years.

At 16 years old, Abdo Benítez moved to the United States. He then completed his university studies at Teikyo Post University in Waterbury, Connecticut, obtaining a degree in marketing. Upon completion of his secondary schooling in 1989 he joined the Paraguayan Armed Forces, obtaining the rank of Second Lieutenant of Reserve Aviation and in turn was appointed by the Air Force Command as a paratrooper.

== Early political career ==
His first steps in politics were in 2005 as a member of the Republican National Reconstruction movement. He was later a member of the Peace and Progress movement and won the Vice Presidency of the Colorado Party in 2005. In June 2015, he was elected president of the Senate of Paraguay.

Abdo Benítez has faced criticism for his relationship with the military dictatorship of Alfredo Stroessner, as his father was Stroessner's private secretary. When Stroessner died in 2006, Abdo Benítez was one of the pallbearers at his funeral in Brasília, and Abdo Benítez later proposed that the Governing Board of the Colorado Party pay tribute to Stroessner. The fortune Abdo Benítez owns was inherited from his father, who after the fall of the dictatorship was prosecuted for illicit enrichment, but the case was eventually dismissed. Abdo Benítez has stated that while he believes that Stroessner "did a lot for the country", he also clarified that he does not condone the violations of human rights, torture and persecution committed during the regime.

== Presidency ==
=== Election ===
In December 2017, Abdo Benítez won the Colorado Party presidential primaries by defeating former Minister of Finance Santiago Peña with 564,811 votes (50.93%) to 480,114 (43.29%). In April 2018, Abdo Benítez won the 2018 elections by defeating Efraín Alegre, with 46.46% of the votes to Alegre's 42.73%. At 46 years of age Benítez became, by a mere month's margin to Nicanor Duarte, the youngest President of Paraguay since Alfredo Stroessner, at 41, assumed power in 1954.

Abdo Benítez was inaugurated as president on August 15, 2018. His predecessor Horacio Cartes, with whom he was in conflict, was not present at the ceremony.

=== Domestic policy ===
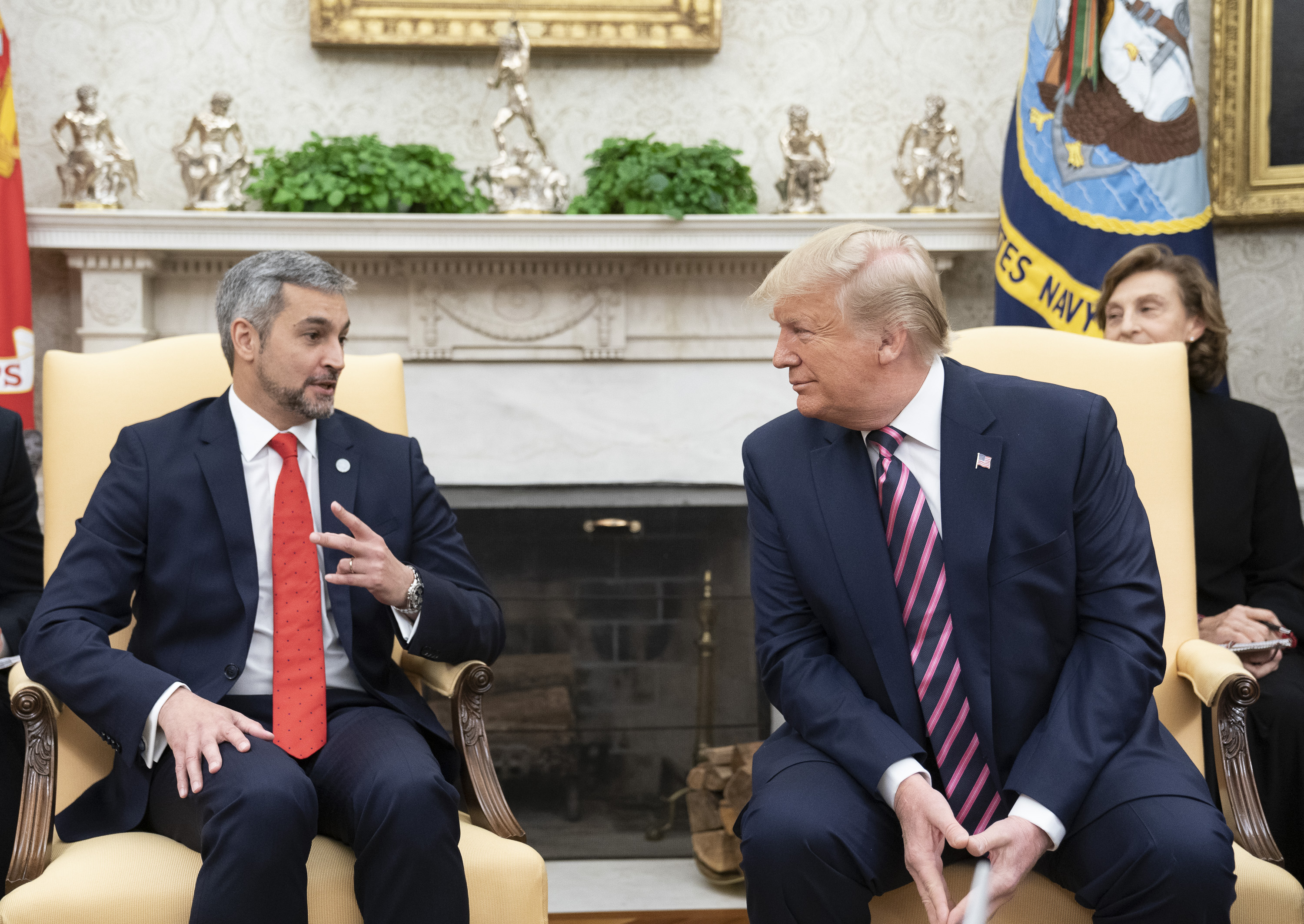
Then-U.S. President Donald Trump meets with Paraguayan President Abdo Benítez in December 2019.

He supported the reform of the judicial system, considered corrupt. Like his opponent at the elections, Efraín Alegre, he opposes the legalization of abortion and same-sex marriage, though he stated to be "open" to a "debate" on abortion.

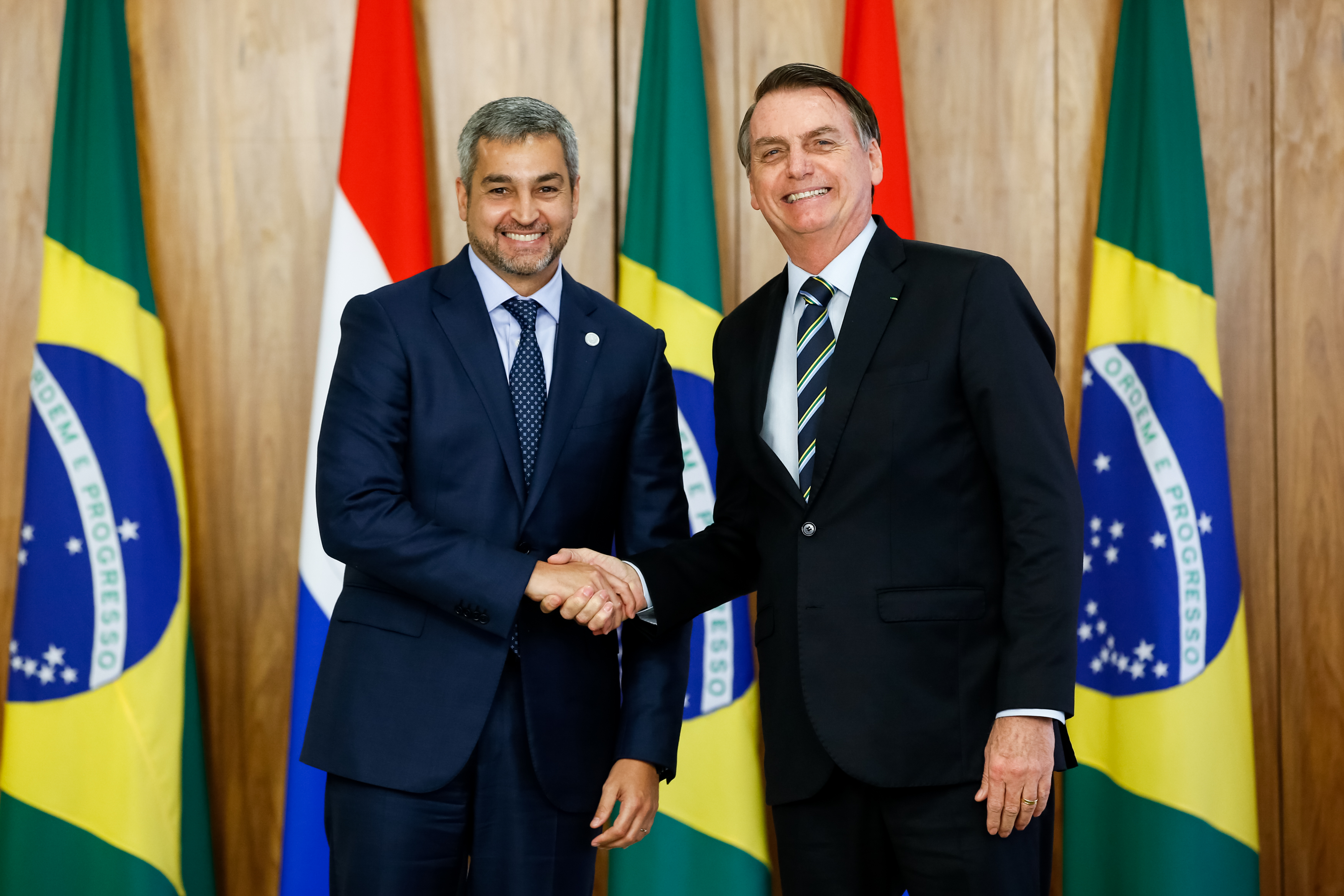
Abdo with President of Brazil Jair Bolsonaro.

In mid-2019, he faced the possibility of an impeachment procedure for having signed an agreement with Brazilian President Jair Bolsonaro on the Itaipu Dam, which was considered to be clearly unfavourable for Paraguay. He finally had this agreement cancelled, defusing the impeachment process.

On economic issues, Abdo Benitez's government continues the policy pursued for a century in favor of large landowners. Abdo Benitez's government designed a tax reform that was approved by Congress in September 2019. In 2019, the Paraguayan economy went into recession.

One year after taking office, the government has experienced a high rate of disapproval of its management (69.3% in August 2019). As a result, the phrase "Desastre ko Marito" (a mixture of Guarani and Spanish roughly meaning "Marito is a disaster") became widespread in use, spawning merchandising. Abdo Benítez has jokingly referenced the phrase on occasion.

In June 2022, 81% of those polled rated President Mario Abdo Benitez negatively. On the other hand, some 70% of those polled believe that Paraguay "needs profound changes", 19% think that Paraguay needs stability and 9% that the country needs moderate changes.

=== Foreign policy ===
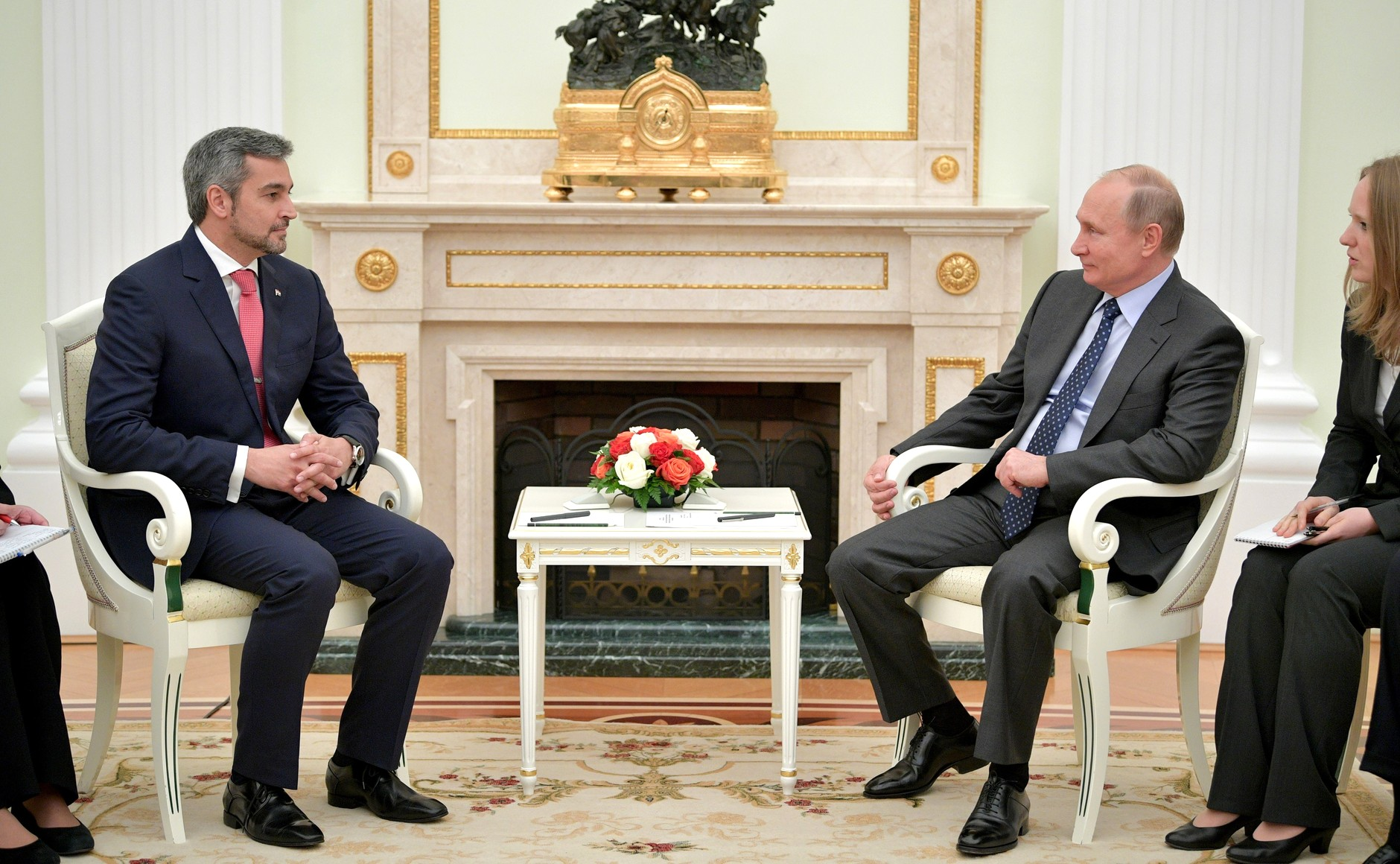
Russian President Vladimir Putin meets with then-President-elect of Paraguay Abdo Benítez in June 2018.

In September 2018, he annulled the decision of his predecessor to transfer the Paraguayan embassy from Tel Aviv to Jerusalem, stating that he had not been consulted, and declared that he had taken this decision believing it to "contribute to the intensification of regional and international diplomatic efforts in the goal of achieving an enlarged, just and lasting peace in the Middle East". This decision led to tensions with the Israeli government, which responded by closing its embassy in Paraguay.

In January 2019, he broke off diplomatic relations with Venezuela and recognized Venezuelan opposition leader and National Assembly President Juan Guaidó as President of the country. He received Guaidó at the presidential palace in Asunción.

=== Cajubi ===
Regarding the so-called “theft of the century,” in October 2018, Benitez declared in official media that the Itaipu Binational Pension and Retirement Fund (Cajubi) had managed to seize assets in Canada valued at 21.6 million Canadian dollars (approximately US$17 million), through a favorable ruling from a civil court in Ontario, Canada.

Benitez stated that this is an essential message in line with the new climate of zero impunity and zero corruption in the government. He also asserted, “Foreigners cannot come and seize our assets and get away with it. We will continue until we recover almost all of our funds.”

The president of Cajubi, Julio Romero, accompanied by other directors of Itaipu and Cajubi, after they meet with President Benítez and the Director General of Itaipu, José Alberto Alderete, at the Palacio de López, announced in a press conference that Cajubi had managed to seize US$17 million (21.6 million Canadian dollars) from Eduardo García Obregón (Eduardo García) and others defended in the civil lawsuit.

Romero said, “Cajubi will proceed with the seizure of the assets and property already located in Canada, the United States, and Guatemala, without ruling out tracing them in other countries, until the greatest possible amount is recovered.”

Romero also noted, “We know they have assets in companies in several countries, mansions, and even luxury cars. We have specialized personnel working to recover every last cent.” He also indicated that the institution has an actuarial deficit, suggesting it will face problems by 2025, making it urgent to recover the lost assets.

On June 19, 2019, the Chamber of Deputies, through Resolution 758 (File D-1952264), requested that the president of Cajubi, Julio Romero, hand over the documents and information related to the “heist of the century.”

Romero responded via letter E/PR//0094/2019 dated August 14, 2019, stating that “Cajubi is not a public body or entity subject to compliance with the Law above.”

In March 2020, the Minister of Finance, Benigno López (appointed by President Benítez), promoted the creation of a Superintendency of Pensions and Retirement Benefits.

López told the media: "In this way, contributions to pension funds will be monitored by a competent technical body, which will ensure that these savings are respected and preserved over time, preventing a repeat of cases like Cajubi, which resulted in losses of $130 million. The benefit is for people who have their life savings there, who will now have someone to carry out the necessary oversight".

In May 2021, the Minister of Foreign Affairs (appointed by President Benítez), Euclides Acevedo, met with the British Ambassador to Paraguay, Ramin Navai, to follow up on the extradition request for London residents Marcelo Barone and Elisabel Vasquez, in connection with US$40 million from the Cajubi investments—"the heist of the century."

=== Public perception ===
In August 2019, upon the completion of the first year of his term, empirical records from the Center for Research and Socioeconomic Studies (CIES) indicated that 69.3% of respondents expressed an unfavorable evaluation of his government administration.

In June 2022, according to citizen perception data published by the Latin American Strategic Center for Geopolitics (CELAG), 81% of respondents rated Abdo Benítez's presidential image negatively. Likewise, 70.3% stated that the country required profound structural transformations; 19.4% favored maintaining conditions of stability, while 9.5% considered moderate changes to be appropriate.

== Personal life ==
His first marriage was to Fátima María Díaz, with whom he had two sons. Following their divorce, he married Silvana López Moreira, with whom he has one son.

== Honours ==
Benítez was awarded the Order of Brilliant Jade with Grand Cordon by President of the Republic of China Tsai Ing-wen on 8 October 2018. During the ceremony, Tsai mentioned the role that Benítez's father held in the Stroessner government, which established bilateral relations. Also he was awarded the Order of Merit of the Italian Republic with Grand Cordon by the President of the Italian Republic on 19 January 2023.

=== Foreign ===
- Taiwan:
  - Grand Cordon of the Order of Brilliant Jade - 2018
- Bolivia:
  - Grand Collar of the Order of the Condor of the Andes - 2019
- Colombia:
  - Grand Collar of the Order of Boyaca - 2022
- Italy:
  - Knight Grand Cross with Collar of the Order of Merit of the Italian Republic - 2023

Political offices
| Preceded by Blas Llano | President of the Senate; 2015–2016 | Succeeded by Roberto Acevedo Penedo |
| Preceded by Horacio Cartes | President of Paraguay; 2018–2023 | Succeeded by Santiago Peña |
Party political offices
| Preceded by Horacio Cartes | Colorado Party nominee for President of Paraguay; 2018 | Succeeded by Santiago Peña |
