= Emilio Aceval =

Emilio Aceval Marín
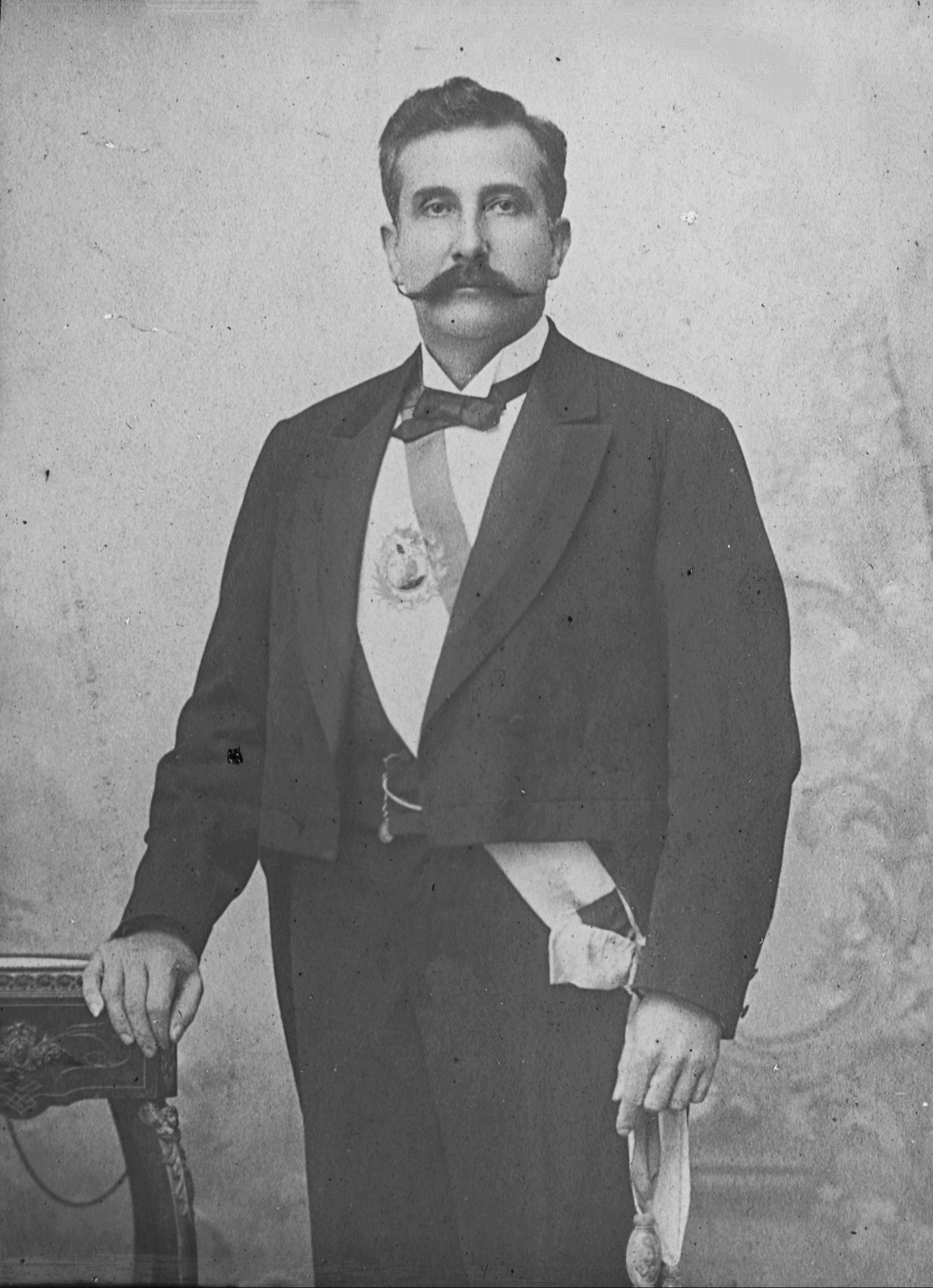
- Official portrait, 1898

14th President of Paraguay
- In office November 25, 1898 – January 9, 1902
- Vice President: Don Hector Carvallo
- Preceded by: Juan Bautista Egusquiza
- Succeeded by: Andrés Héctor Carvallo

Personal details
- Born: October 16, 1853 Asunción, Paraguay
- Died: April 15, 1931 (aged 77) Asunción, Paraguay
- Party: Colorado
- Spouse(s): Adelina Díaz de Bedoya, in second marriage, Mrs. Josefina Rivarola.

Emilio Aceval Marín (October 16, 1853 – April 15, 1931) was President of Paraguay from 1898 to 1902. He was a member of the Colorado Party.

== Biography ==
Aceval's parents were Don Leonardo Aceval and Monica Marín. He studied under Fidel Maíz. Upon the outbreak of the war against the Triple Alliance, he joined the Army at age 13 as a child soldier. He was injured at Pirayú and then fought at Acosta Ñu, where he served as a sergeant major. Days later, he was taken prisoner in the Battle of Curuguaty.

At the end of the war, Aceval moved with his relatives to Corrientes and then to Buenos Aires, where he resumed his studies at National Central College. He studied engineering in the postwar period, but had to stop because of a serious illness. After his recovery, he made a long trip to Europe and the United States, returning in 1881 to become a landowner and farmer. He also served as Minister of Finance and was War and Navy Minister during the government of General Egusquiza, and was a member of the Colorado Party.

== Presidency ==
He was President of the Republic from November 25, 1898 to January 9, 1902. His cabinet was formed by: José P. Urdapilleta, Finance; José Segundo Decoud in Foreign Affairs, Guillermo de los Rios in the Interior; José Zacarías Caminos, Venancio Víctor López, Gerónimo Pereira Cazal, and Pedro José Tomás Bobadilla, Justice, Worship and Public Instruction, and Colonel Juan Antonio Escurra in War and Navy.

During the government of President Aceval, the National Council on Education, the Directorate General of Schools, and the National Council of Hygiene were created, as well as an Internal Revenue Service, and settled colonies of immigrants, especially Italians. Paraguay also participated in the International Exhibition of Philadelphia during Aceval's presidency, and went through an epidemic of bubonic plague, which led to the creation of the Bacteriological Office.

A relapse in the political situation caused serious conflicts reflected in Congress. On January 9, 1902, a military revolutionary committee forced Aceval to resign. Congress decided to appoint as his successor, vice president, Don Héctor Carballo. Aceval's removal has been characterized as a military coup.

He died in Asunción on April 15, 1931.

== Notes ==
Political offices
| Preceded by Juan Bautista Egusquiza | President of Paraguay; 1898–1902 | Succeeded by Andrés Héctor Carvallo |
