= Marcos Morínigo =

Paraguayan politician (1848-1901)

Marcos Antonio Morínigo
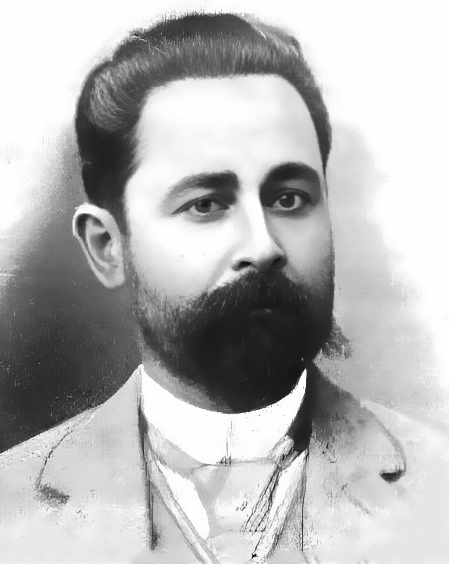

12th President of Paraguay
- In office 9 June 1894 – 25 November 1894
- Vice President: Vacant
- Preceded by: Juan Gualberto González
- Succeeded by: Juan Bautista Egusquiza

7th Vice President of Paraguay
- In office 25 November 1890 – 9 June 1894
- President: Juan Gualberto González
- Preceded by: José del Rosario Miranda
- Succeeded by: Facundo Ynsfrán

Personal details
- Born: Marcos Antonio Morínigo Fleytas; 8 October 1848 Quyquyhó, Paraguay
- Died: 13 July 1901 (aged 52) Asunción, Paraguay
- Party: Colorado Party
- Spouse: Ramona Bareiro Caballero
- Children: 6
- Occupation: Politician

Marcos Antonio Morínigo Fleytas (8 October 1848 – 13 July 1901) was a Paraguayan politician who served as President of Paraguay in 1894.

He was born in 1848 in Quyquyho, Paraguarí. In 1881, he was elected for his first term in the Chamber of Deputies, a post he held for more than nine years.

In 1887, Morinigo participated in founding the Colorado Party and was elected Vice President of Paraguay in 1890 (alongside President Juan Gualberto González). After González was sacked, he became president on June 8, 1894, until the legal end of the term on November 25, 1894. Morinigo was elected senator in 1895. He died 1901 in Asunción.

Political offices
Preceded by José del Rosario Miranda	Vice President of Paraguay; 1890–1894	Succeeded by Facundo Ynsfrán
Preceded by Juan Gualberto González	President of Paraguay; 1894	Succeeded by Juan Bautista Egusquiza
