= Ñandutí =

Traditional Paraguayan lace

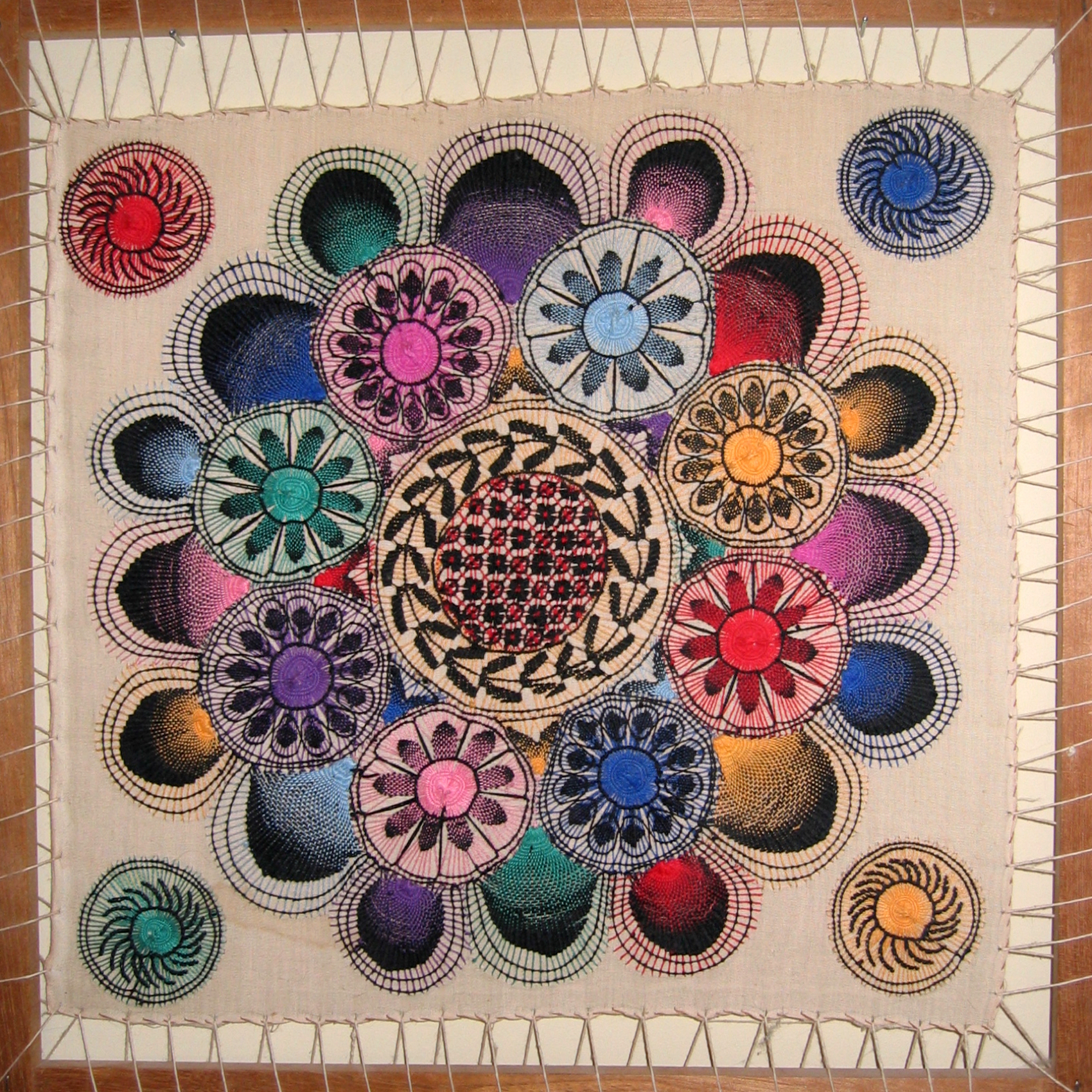
- Ñandutí: The flower in the spider's web from Asunción Paraguay
- Type: Lace
- Material: Cotton or silk
- Production method: Needle lace
- Production process: Handicraft
- Place of origin: Paraguay

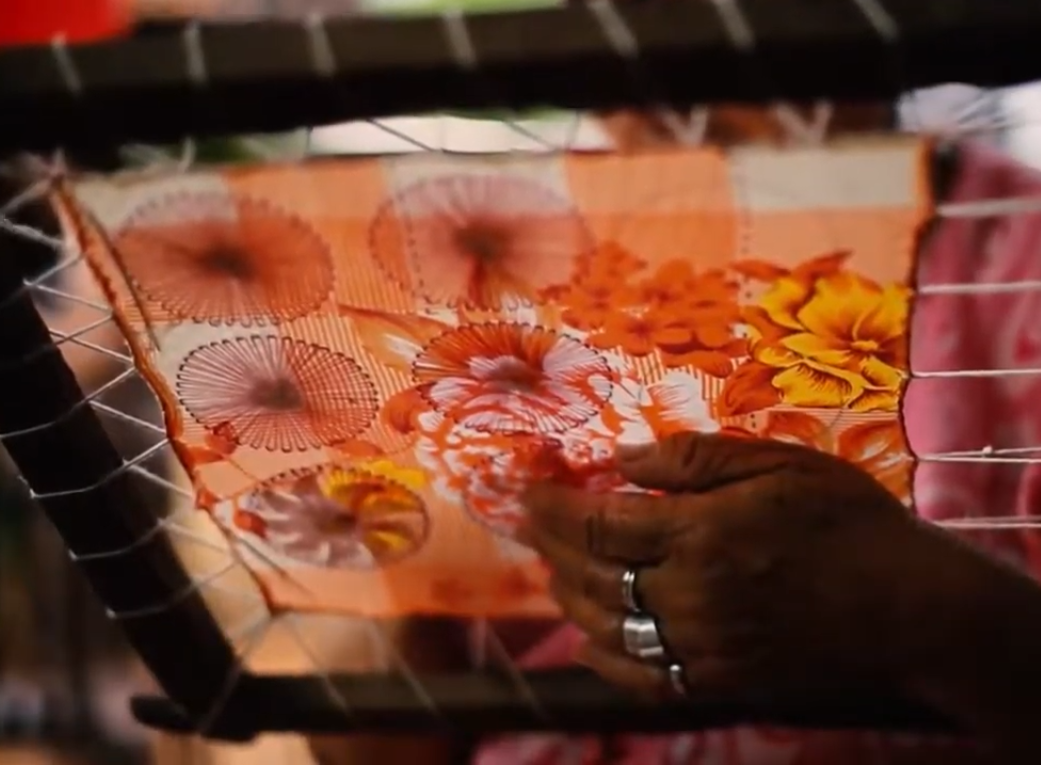
Ñandutí

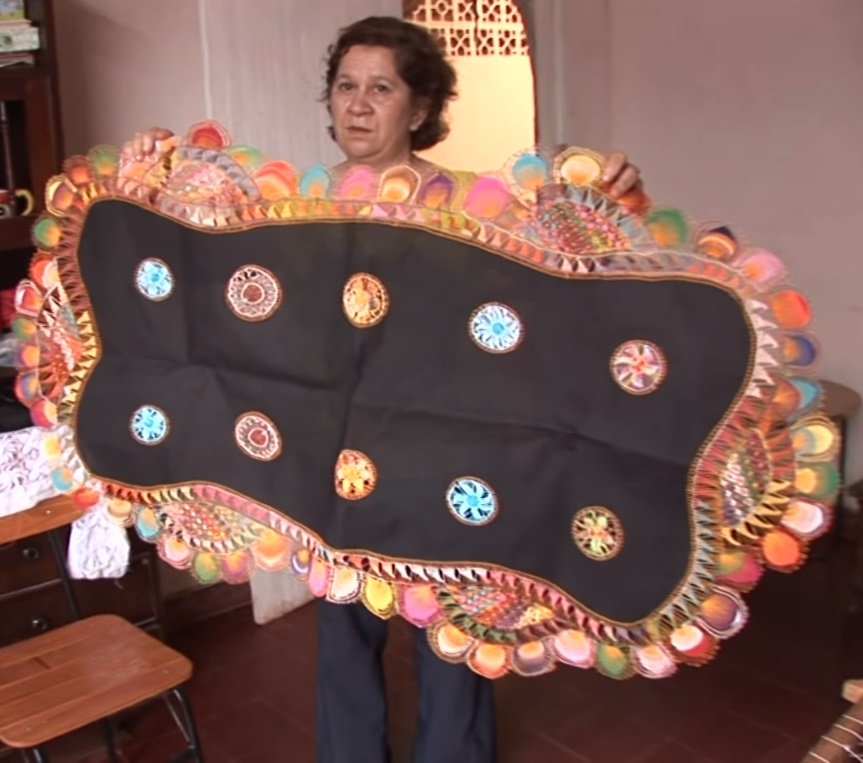
Paraguayan woman displays ñandutí lace

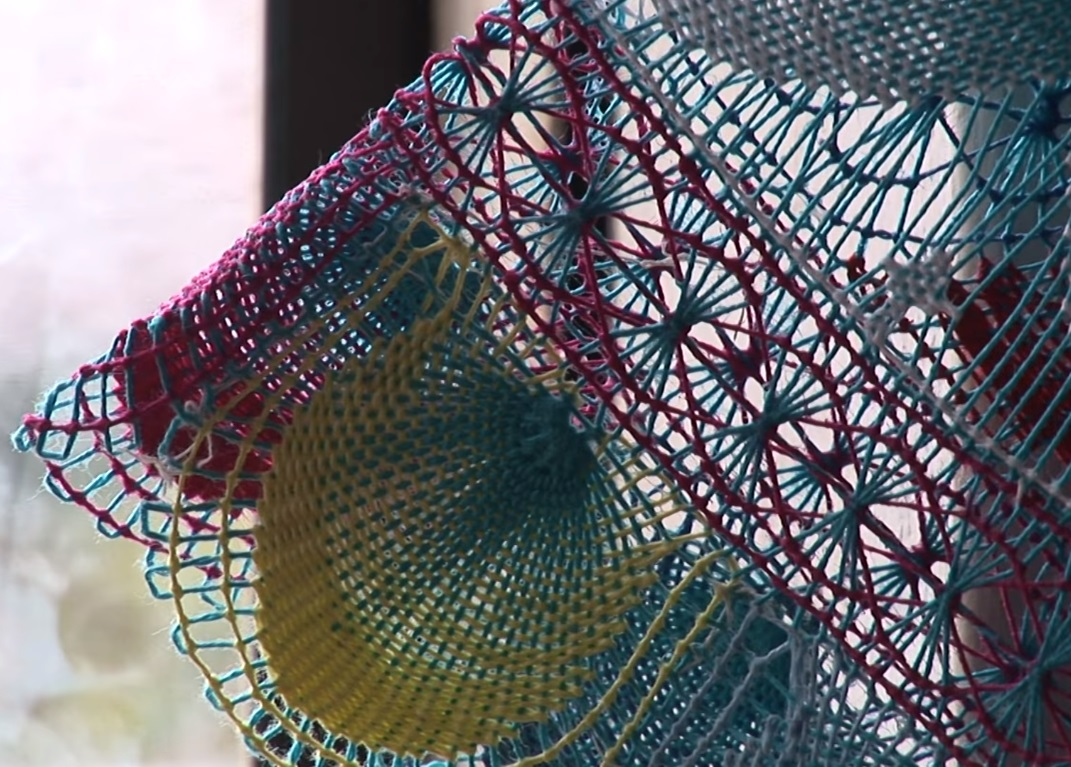
Ñandutí detail

Ñandutí is a traditional Paraguayan lace. The name means "spider web" in Guaraní, the official, indigenous language of Paraguay.

The lace is worked on fabric which is stretched tightly in a frame. The pattern is drawn on the fabric and the threads, which go to-and-fro across the circular motif and are either taken through running stitches worked along the pattern lines or stitched directly through the fabric. When finished, the motifs are released by either cutting the running stitches or cutting away the backing fabric. While single motifs can be worked like this, it is more usual to work the whole item as one piece - the pattern for the complete mat or collar is drawn on the fabric and the wheels are linked together as the radial threads are laid down.

== Technique ==
Ñandutí is woven with a needle and threads of cotton or silk. Its most notable characteristic is a matrix of squares, rectangles, or circles, usually about 2 inches (5 cm) across, with a radiating warp.

To make ñandutí a quadrangular frame of adequate size is needed according to the piece being made. The four sides of the frame are tied to each other at the corners with twine. On this frame a piece of fabric will be stretched, also with twine, to support the needlework.

The lacemaker recognizes three stages in the making of ñandutí, each identified by the object she uses: a pencil, a needle, and a pair of scissors. With the pencil she traces a design previously drawn on a piece of paper, which she puts under the fabric that is stretched on the frame. The needle stage begins when the lacemaker starts building the warp (armaje) of the first disc. Following the outline of the circle, a stitch is made at the top and one at the bottom exactly on the diameter, working clockwise. From 120 to 150 rays per disc are thus stretched. From that moment on, no other stitches will be attached on the fabric. Once the warp has been laid out, the lacemaker will make two rounds of darning stitches around the center of the disc to firmly fasten the threads of the rays that have been superimposed on each other.

The center thus formed is called the “apyte”. If the lacemaker intends to make only one large flower or a star motif within a disc, she will form the petals or points of the star starting from that center. If she is going to use any other motif, she will divide the warp laid out in three more or less equal parts, using an approximate calculation rather than an exact measurement. At the end of the first third part of the disc she will make one, two, or a maximum of three concentric circles. This process is known as “filleting”, since it is made with a stitch called “fillet”. It is the knot stitch, and is used for tying together two threads of the warp.

It is on this radiated, filleted warp, that is, on the second-third of the disc, that she will lace the decorative motifs that she calls “dechados”, distributing them as she pleases. For this process she will only use two stitches: the darning stitch (tejido) or woven stitch, and fillet or knot stitch. Once a motif is completed, the lacemaker will again make one or two concentric circles at the edge of the disc, so as to give it a neat, reinforced finish. Once she finished ornamenting the first disc, the rest of them is made in the same way.

This completes the needle stage. The lacemaker then turns the frame around so that the back of the work is facing upward, and the scissors stage begins. With a pair of scissors she cuts the fabric between the stitches made in it to support the rays of each disc, except at the edge of the piece. Using the tip of the scissors and following the outline of each circle, she will remove or draw out the small pieces of fabric that were left holding on to the stitches of the rays.

== Bibliography ==
- González, Gustavo (1967). Ñandutí. Asunción: Artes Gráficas Zamphirópolos.
- Sanjurjo, Annick (1978). Ñandutí: The flower in the spider's web. Organization of American States. ASIN B00072UZOC.
- Sanjurjo, Annick. Ñandutí, Encaje del Paraguay [Ñandutí, Lace of Paraguay] (in Spanish). Southern Cross Press. ISBN 978-0-9633827-3-3.
