= Juan Bautista Egusquiza =

13th President of Paraguay

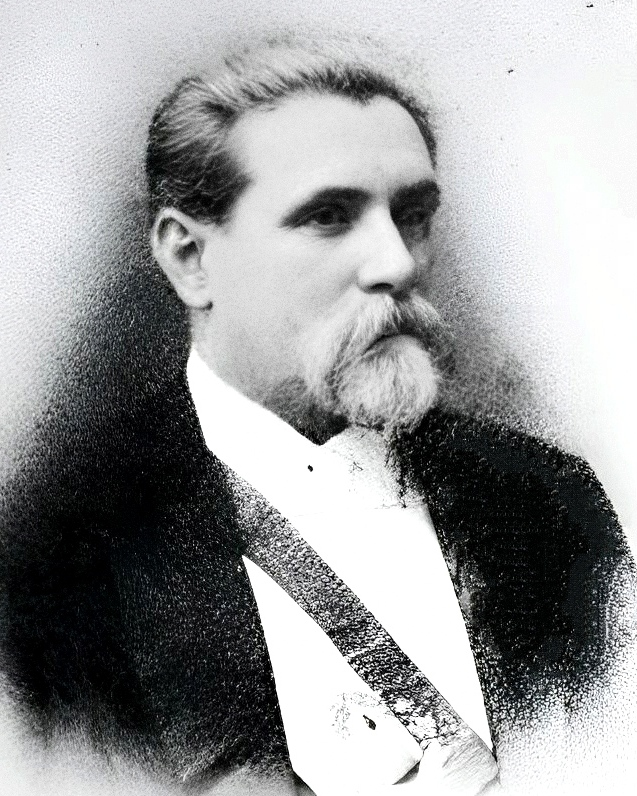
- Egusquiza in 1897

13th President of Paraguay
- In office 25 November 1894 – 25 November 1898
- Vice President: Facundo Ynsfrán
- Preceded by: Marcos Morínigo
- Succeeded by: Emilio Aceval

Personal details
- Born: Juan Bautista Egusquiza Isasi; 25 August 1845 Asunción, Paraguay
- Died: 24 August 1902 (aged 56) Asunción, Paraguay
- Party: Colorado Party
- Spouse: Casiana Isasi
- Education: Colegio Nacional de Buenos Aires

Juan Bautista Egusquiza Isasi (25 August 1845 – 24 August 1902) was a Paraguayan military officer and politician who served as the 13th president of Paraguay from 1894 to 1898.

Political offices
Preceded by Marcos Morínigo	President of Paraguay; 1894–1898	Succeeded by Emilio Aceval
