= List of political parties in Paraguay =

This article lists political parties in Paraguay. Paraguay was a one-party dominant state with the Colorado Party until the 2008 Paraguayan general election when the opposition, Patriotic Alliance for Change, won the presidency.

== Parties ==
=== Parliamentary parties ===
Party	Abbr.	Est.	Ideology	Leader	Senators	Deputies
Colorado Party; Partido Colorado	ANR-PC	1887	National conservatism; Neoliberalism; Populism	Horacio Cartes	17 / 45	42 / 80
Authentic Radical Liberal Party; Partido Liberal Radical Auténtico	PLRA	1887	Liberalism; Radicalism	Efraín Alegre	13 / 45	17 / 80
Guasú Front; Frente Guasú	FG	2010	Democratic socialism; Left-wing populism	Carlos Filizzola	6 / 45	0 / 80
Beloved Fatherland Party; Partido Patria Querida	PPQ	2002	Conservative liberalism; Civic nationalism	Pedro Fadul	3 / 45	3 / 80
Progressive Democratic Party; Partido Democrático Progresista	PDP	2007	Social democracy; Democratic socialism	Desirée Masi	2 / 45	0 / 80
National Crusade Party	PCN	2020	Right-wing populism	Paraguayo Cubas	2 / 45	4 / 80
National Union of Ethical Citizens; Unión Nacional de Ciudadanos Éticos	UNACE	2002	Nationalism; Conservatism	Jorge Oviedo Matto	1 / 45	0 / 80
Great Renewed National Alliance; Gran Alianza Nacional Renovada	GANAR	2017	Social liberalism; Progressivism	Carlos Mateo Balmelli	0 / 45	10 / 80
National Encounter Party; Partido Encuentro Nacional	PEN	1991	Social democracy; Social liberalism	Fernando Camacho	0 / 45	2 / 80

=== Coalitions ===
- Country Forward (Avanza Pais, AP)

=== Other parties ===
- Christian Democratic Party (Partido Demócrata Cristiano)
- Paraguayan Communist Party (Partido Comunista Paraguayo)
- Party for a Country of Solidarity (Partido País Solidario)
- Revolutionary Socialist Party (Partido Socialista Revolucionario)
- Workers' Party (Partido de los Trabajadores)
- Revolutionary Febrerista Party (Partido Revolucionario Febrerista)

== Former parties ==
The Paraguayan Liberal Party fought with the Colorado Party for dominance of the country during the first half of the 20th century. By the end of the Alfredo Stroessner regime the Liberal Party of Paraguay no longer existed, but its political successor, the Authentic Radical Liberal Party, is now the second largest political party in the country.

== See also ==
- Politics of Paraguay
- Lists of political parties
- Liberalism and radicalism in Paraguay
