= SITRANDE =

- Founded: April 1, 1990
- Location: Paraguay
- Key people: Juan B. Orué, general secretary
- Affiliations: CUT-A, FETRASEP, ICEM
- Website: www.facebook.com/SitrandeOficial.

SITRANDE, short for Sindicato de Trabajadores de la ANDE ('ANDE Workers Trade Union'), is a trade union of employees of ANDE (the National Electricity Administration) in Paraguay. In 2023, Adolfo Villalba is the elected general secretary of the union. The slogan of SITRANDE is 'la Fuerza de la Unidad' ('The Force of Unity').

== Affiliations ==
SITRANDE was one of the unions that broke away from Central Unitaria de Trabajadores (CUT) in 1998, and formed the new trade union centre CUT-A. SITRANDE is a member of the International Federation of Chemical, Energy, Mine and General Workers' Unions. SITRANDE is also affiliated to FETRASEP, the national Federation of Energy Sector Workers (Federación de Trabajadores del Sector Energía del Paraguay, founded in 2005). FETRASEP in turn is affiliated to Public Services International. SITRANDE played an important role in organizing cooperation between energy sector unions in the Mercosur region in the latter half of the 1990s, leading to the foundation of COSSEM (Energy Sector Trade Union Commission of Mercosur). SITRANDE is also a member of the Latin American and Caribbean Federation of Energy Sector Workers. SITRANDE forms part of the civil society coalition Alliance for the Defense of Freedom of Expression and the Right to Information.

SITRANDE opposes privatizations in the energy sector. The union took part in the general strike against privatizations organized in 2002. SITRANDE played a prominent part in the FETRASEP campaign for hydroelectrical sovereignty, which lasted from December 2006 and April 2007. The demands raised in the campaign, regarding Paraguayan demands on the Itaipú hydroelectric plant, would become a central theme of the 2008 election campaign (which resulted in the election of Fernando Lugo as president). The organization supported the campaign for energy sovereignty of president Lugo.

== History ==
Trade unions had been banned from the public sector during the Alfredo Stroessner regime. A strike had been organized at the Acaray Dam in February 1990. SITRANDE was founded on April 1, 1990. The founding meeting was held in the hall of the bank workers union FETRABAN on Calle Pettirossi in Asunción. SITRANDE was the first public sector trade union founded in Paraguay after the fall of Stroessner. At the time of its founding SITRANDE had around 800 members, in different parts of the country.

However, neither the new government nor ANDE as an institution was willing to recognize SITRANDE. In the struggle for legal recognition SITRANDE raised the slogan Rodas Rodas rodará y SITRANDE quedará (a reference to the then director of ANDE, Zoilo Rodas Rodas).

On August 27, 1991 SITRANDE organized an Extraordinary General Assembly. The meeting decided to call a strike. The attendees, more than 700 workers, then took out a procession on the streets of Asunción. The SITRANDE strike lasted five days.

During its early period SITRANDE took part in electoral politics. The union supported the candidature of Dr. Carlos Filizzola (the first elected mayor of Asunción).

In 1993 the first Collective Bargaining Agreement was signed in the public sector, after which the role of SITRANDE changed significantly.

In 2000 SITRANDE organized a 37-day strike.

== Vacation home ==
SITRANDE maintains a vacation site, some 50 kilometers from Asunción, for its members.

== Bibliography ==
- Coronel Prosman, Jorge (ed.). 20 años de lucha - haciendo historia. Asunción: Arandurã Editorial, 2010
