= Guillermo Caballero Vargas =

Paraguayan politician and businessman (1943–2025)

- Born: Guillermo Bernardino Caballero Vargas; 1 December 1943; Asunción, Paraguay
- Died: 25 May 2025 (aged 81)
- Occupations: Politician; businessman
- Political party: National Encounter Party

Guillermo Bernardino Caballero Vargas (1 December 1943 – 25 May 2025) was a Paraguayan politician and businessman. He was the founder of the National Encounter Party (PEN), under which he ran for president of Paraguay in the 1993 Paraguayan general election.

== Early years and family ==
Guillermo Caballero Vargas was born on 1 December 1943, in Asunción. Political activity was part of his family: his father, Carlos Caballero Gatti, was president of the Revolutionary Febrerista Party (PRF) and also a candidate for president of Paraguay for the same party, in 1968. He was the grandson of Marcos Caballero Codas, a Liberal political leader and member of the 1911 Triumvirate of Paraguay, with Adolfo Aponte and Mario Usher. He was also the great-grandson of Bernardino Caballero, founder of the Colorado Party and president from 1880 to 1886.

== Career ==
=== Political career ===
Caballero Vargas founded the National Encounter Party (PEN) in 1991 and ran in the 1993 Paraguayan general election with María Victoria Brusquetti as vice-presidential candidate, in alliance with the Febrerista Revolutionary Party and the Christian Democratic Party, among others. In the elections, Caballero Vargas obtained 23% of the votes, finishing in third place behind Domingo Laíno, for the Authentic Radical Liberal Party (PLRA), and the elected president, Juan Carlos Wasmosy, for the National Republican Association (ANR), aka the Colorado Party. As a result, his party represented the third political force in the country at that time, and as such his influence and positions were described as key to the democratic transition in Paraguay.

Later, he was part of the Gobierno de Unidad Nacional ("National Unity Government") during the presidency of Luis González Macchi until 2003, being Minister of Industry and Commerce during that period. In 2008, the PEN supported the candidacy of Fernando Lugo for the presidency, who won the election that year and ended Colorado Party government after more than 60 years of uninterrupted power.

In his later years, he was critical of Paraguayan politics in general, stating in a 2024 interview that he had distanced himself from political activity because it was "frustrating" due to the deterioration of the country's political class. He singled out Congress as "a contest of the inept" who had "used [it] as a source of illicit enrichment." He asserted that Horacio Cartes and his political movement exercised a cacicazgo that had taken over political institutions, which was "not healthy for the country." He also stated that the Paraguayan political opposition needed to make compromises to have a chance to succeed in the future.

=== Business career ===
Aside from his political career, Caballero Vargas was also recognized for his work as a businessman in the industrial sector, as he was president of Manufacturas Pilar S.A., as well as in the livestock sector.

== Death ==
Caballero Vargas died on 25 May 2025, at the age of 81.
