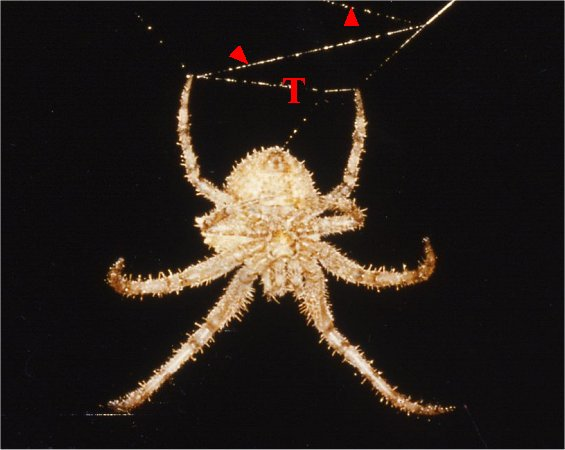
- Kaira alba

Scientific classification
- Kingdom: Animalia
- Phylum: Arthropoda
- Subphylum: Chelicerata
- Class: Arachnida
- Order: Araneae
- Infraorder: Araneomorphae
- Family: Araneidae
- Genus: Kaira; O. Pickard-Cambridge, 1889

Type species
- K. gibberosa O. Pickard-Cambridge, 1890

Species
- 17, see text

Synonyms
- Macpos Mello-Leitão, 1940; Pronarachne Mello-Leitão, 1937

= Kaira (spider) =

Frilled orbweavers

Genus of spiders

Kaira, sometimes called frilled orbweavers, is a mostly neotropical genus of orb-weaver spiders first described by O. Pickard-Cambridge in 1889. It includes sixteen described species that occur from South America up to the southern and eastern USA. It is presumably related to Aculepeira, Amazonepeira and Metepeira.

They spin small webs from which they hang upside down and attract male moths that fly into a basket formed by their legs. They use a moth pheromone for this, which resembles the one used by the bolas spiders of the genus Mastophora. Though they belong to the same family, the two genera are not closely related, so this is likely an example of convergent evolution.

All species are pale yellow-white with scattered, small, white, brown and black random spots, or in some species transverse bands. Females have a body length of about 4 to 10 millimetres (0.16 to 0.39 in). Males are less than half the size of females and less pigmented.

Kaira specimens are uncommon in arachnologist collections, and the females of different species are difficult to separate. Females and immatures can be confused with species of the not closely related genus Pozonia.

== Behavior ==
When a fly was put into a jar containing a K. alba, the female dropped from the underside of the lid on what seemed a single thread about 12 mm (0.47 in) long and hung there until the fly blundered into her. Then she clamped her legs around it and killed it. Instead of constructing orb webs, they construct a small trapezoidal web, containing two triangular zigzags of threads, which is remade every twenty minutes. The spider then hangs upside-down by the fourth leg on the lower and shorter parallel edge of the trapezoid, which is spread by the other legs. When a moth flies into the basket formed by the spider's legs, it is clasped and bitten, and later wrapped in araneid-like fashion. The moth is then hung from a trapeze line between the last legs of the spider, which resumes the hunting posture. As many as eight moths can be caught in this way before the spider starts feeding. A microscopical study of astounding silk glands was done to explain attraction and capture of preys (external link)

== Species ==
As of November 2026 it contains seventeen species:

- Kaira alba (Hentz, 1850) – USA, Mexico
- Kaira altiventer O. Pickard-Cambridge, 1889 – USA to Brazil
- Kaira candidissima (Mello-Leitão, 1941) – Argentina
- Kaira cobimcha Levi, 1993 – Brazil
- Kaira conica Gerschman & Schiapelli, 1948 – Brazil, Argentina
- Kaira dianae Levi, 1993 – Peru
- Kaira echinus (Simon, 1897) – Brazil, Argentina
- Kaira electa (Keyserling, 1883) – Brazil
- Kaira erwini Levi, 1993 – Peru
- Kaira gibberosa O. Pickard-Cambridge, 1890 – Mexico to Brazil
- Kaira hiteae Levi, 1977 – USA
- Kaira levii Alayón, 1993 – Cuba
- Kaira mbywangiae Pett & Pai-Gibson, 2024 – Paraguay
- Kaira sabino Levi, 1977 – USA
- Kaira sexta (Chamberlin, 1916) – Guatemala to Brazil
- Kaira shinguito Levi, 1993 – Peru
- Kaira tulua Levi, 1993 – Colombia
