= Filizzola =

Filizzola is an Italian surname. Notable people with the surname include:

- Carlos Filizzola (born 1959), Paraguayan politician
- Maximiliano Filizzola (born 1996), Argentine rugby union player
- Rafael Filizzola (born 1968), Paraguayan politician
