= Partido Patria Libre =

Political party in Paraguay

Free Fatherland Party Partido Patria Libre
- Founded: 3 February 1990
- Headquarters: Asunción
- Armed wing: EPP (until 2005)
- Ideology: Communism; Marxism–Leninism; Guevarism; Foco theory; Socialist patriotism; Anti-imperialism; Revolutionary socialism
- Political position: Far-left
- International affiliation: Foro de São Paulo

Party flag

Partido Patria Libre (lit. Free Homeland Party, PPL) is a far-left Marxist–Leninist communist party in Paraguay. It defines its goals as "Marxist–Leninist, socialist patriotist, and anti-imperialist."

== History ==
The PPL was founded by former activists of the Popular Democratic Movement (MDP) on 3 February 1990, under the name Corriente Patria Libre (lit. Free Homeland Current). In February 1992, it was renamed Movimiento Patria Libre (Free Homeland Movement). It acquired its current name in December 2002 after the movement was officially registered as a political party.

The PPL has strong roots in the movement for left regroupment and led the United Left (Paraguay) (IU) alliance, which also included the Workers' Party (PT), the Socialist Revolutionary Nucleus (NRS), the April 19 Indigenous Movement (M-19 Abril), and the Paraguayan Socialist Party (PSP). The Paraguayan Communist Party (PCP) withdrew from IU in 2003.

In the 2003 presidential elections, Tomás Zayas of the United Left received about 0.3 percent of the vote (4,550 total votes). In the 2003 legislative elections, PPL candidates won 1.1% of the vote in the Chamber of Deputies and 1% of the vote in the Senate. Neither result was significant enough to win any seats. The party did not participate in the 2008 general elections, but contested the 2013 elections, in which it received around 0.1% of the vote, again failing to win any seats.

== Ideology ==
The PPL platform calls for, among other things,

- the consolidation of national independence, including political and economic independence
- the abolition of repressive laws and decrees;
- protection of freedom of thought, freedom of political organization, freedom of association, freedom of expression, freedom of the press, and the right to strike;
- an end to impunity for past human rights violations;
- a national plan for economic development directed by the state;
- wide-ranging agrarian reform;
- a national plan for health, education, and housing;
- the eradication of all forms of discrimination and oppression;
- full participation of women in the political, economic, and social spheres;
- special attention to the needs of children, seniors, and the disabled;
- the preservation of the environment and wise exploitation of natural resources;
- the eventual political and economic integration of Latin America based on socialist principles.
