= National Encounter Party =

Political party in Paraguay

National Encounter Party Partido Encuentro Nacional
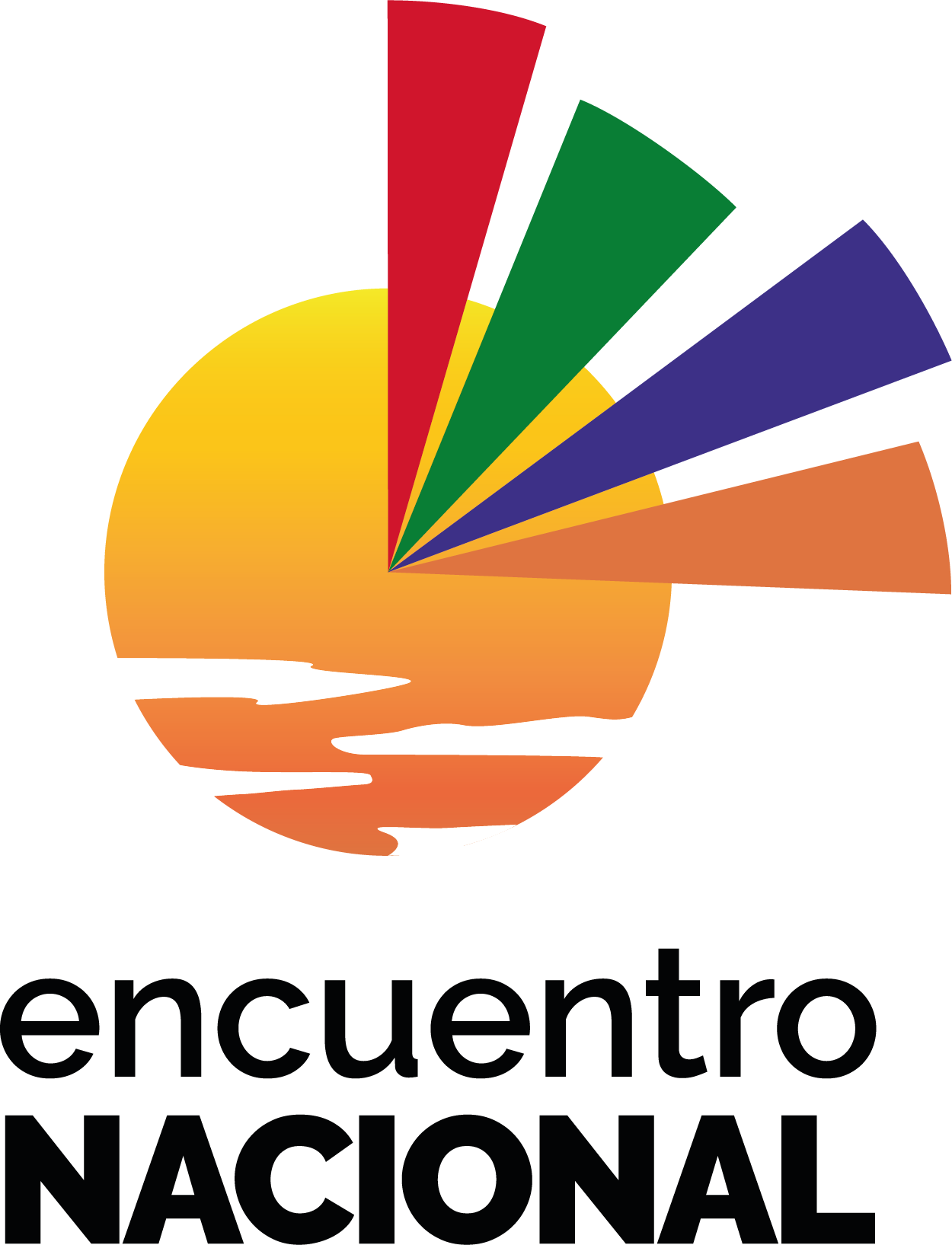
- Abbreviation: PEN
- President: Gloria Portillo
- Founder: Guillermo Caballero
- Founded: 26 October 1991
- Headquarters: Asunción
- Ideology: Social democracy Third Way
- Political position: Centre-left
- National affiliation: Concertación
- Chamber of Deputies: 1 / 80
- Senate: 1 / 45

Website
- www.encuentronacional.org.py

The National Encounter Party (Spanish: Partido Encuentro Nacional, PEN) is a political party in Paraguay.

== History ==
The National Encounter Movement was established on 26 October 1991. Prior to the 1993 elections the National Encounter Party was established as a coalition of the Revolutionary Febrerista Party, the Christian Democratic Party, Asuncion for All and a breakaway faction of the Colorado Party. The elections saw the party receive 17.9% of the national vote, becoming the country's third largest party with nine seats in the Chamber of Deputies and eight in the Senate. Together with the Authentic Radical Liberal Party (PLRA), it held a majority in the Chamber of Deputies opposed to the ruling Colorado Party. Its candidate in the presidential election, Guillermo Caballero Vargas, received 24.1% of the vote. Their candidate for the vice-presidency, María Victoria Brusquetti, was the first ever woman to run for the position.

For the 1998 general elections the party formed an alliance with the PLRA named the Democratic Alliance, with the party's president, Carlos Filizzola, providing the alliance's vice-presidential candidate. However, the PEN was reduced to eight seats in the Chamber and seven in the Senate as the Colorado Party regained their majority in both houses, and the alliance's presidential candidate, Domingo Laino finished second with 43.9% of the vote. In 2000 Filizzola, who had been the party's president from April 1996 to March 1999, led his Movimiento Participación Amplia, Integración Solidaridad (PAIS) faction out of the party to form the Party for a Country of Solidarity.

By the 2003 elections support for the party had dwindled, and it won only one seat in the Senate and none in the Chamber of Deputies, whilst its presidential candidate, Diego Abente Brun received just 0.6% of the vote. For the 2008 elections the party joined the Patriotic Alliance for Change, which won two seats in the Chamber.

== Electoral history ==
=== Presidential elections ===
Election	Party candidate	Votes	%	Result
1993	Guillermo Caballero Vargas	262,407	24.39%	Lost ✗
1998	Supported Domingo Laíno (PLRA)	703,379	43.88%	Lost ✗
2003	Diego Abente Brun	8,745	0.58%	Lost ✗
2008	Supported Fernando Lugo (PDC)	766,502	42.40%	Elected ✓

=== Chamber of Deputies elections ===
Election	Votes	%	Seats	+/–
1993	199,053	17.7%	9 / 80	▲9
1998	681,917 (as part of Democratic Alliance)	42.8%	35 / 80	▲26
2003	39,372	2.7%	0 / 80	▼35
2008	14,227	0.80%	0 / 80	Steady
2013	108,662	4.84%	2 / 80	▲2
2018	75,514	3.18%	2 / 80	Steady

=== Senate elections ===
Election	Votes	%	Seats	+/–
1993	203,213	17.9%	8 / 80	▲8
1998	661,764 (as part of Democratic Alliance)	42.1%	20 / 45	▲12
2003	31,212	2.1%	1 / 45	▼19
2008	20,843	1.19%	0 / 45	Steady
2013	78,460	3.49%	1 / 45	▲1
2018	30,365	1.29%	0 / 45	▼1

==== Notes ====
The Democratic Alliance was an alliance of the Authentic Radical Liberal Party and the National Encounter Party

== Bibliography ==
- Dieter Nohlen (2005). Elections in the America: A Data Handbook - Volume 2 South America. Oxford University Press. ISBN 978-0-19-928358-3.
