= ANDE (Paraguay) =

Operator of Paraguay's national electricity grid

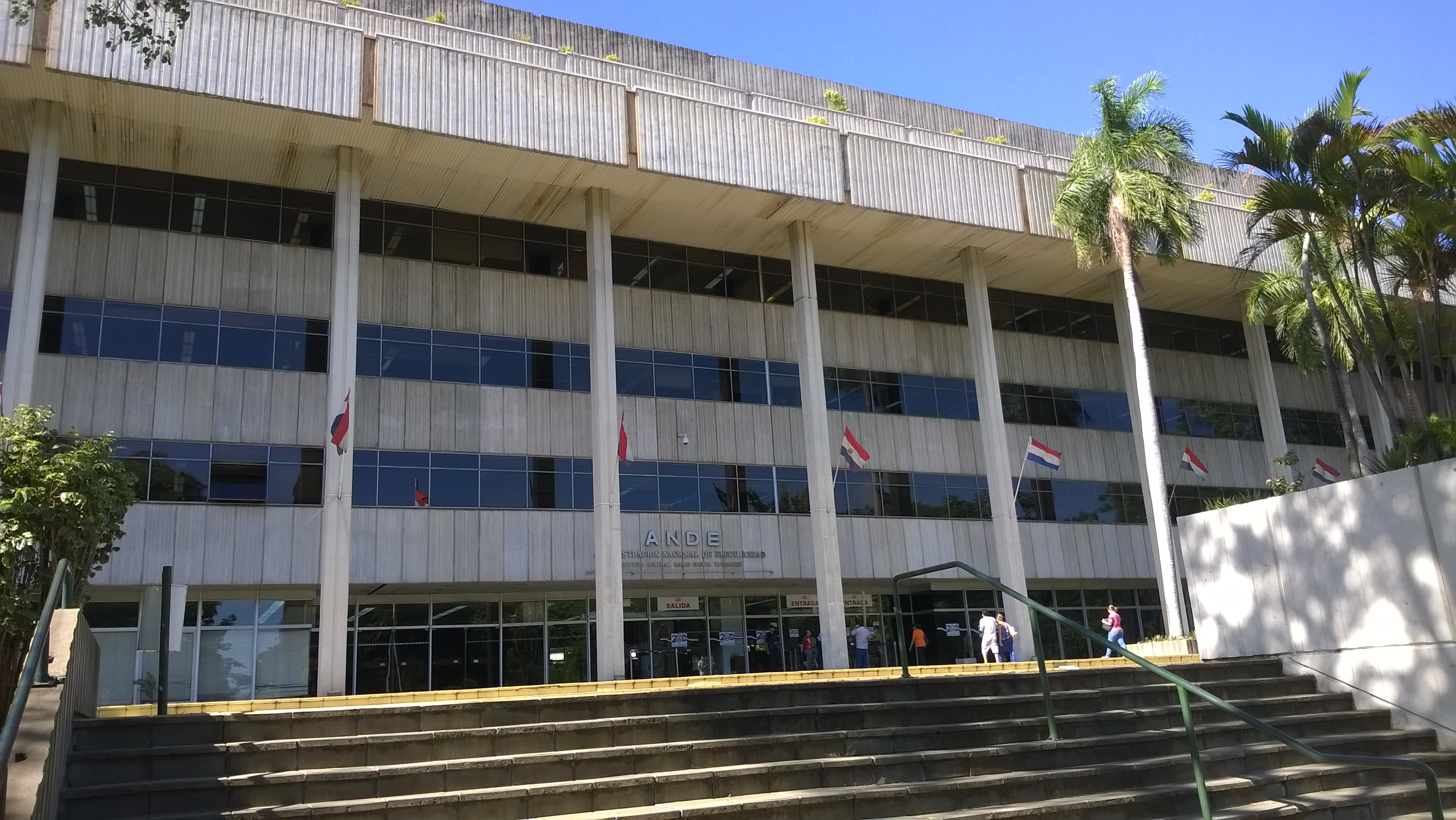
Head office

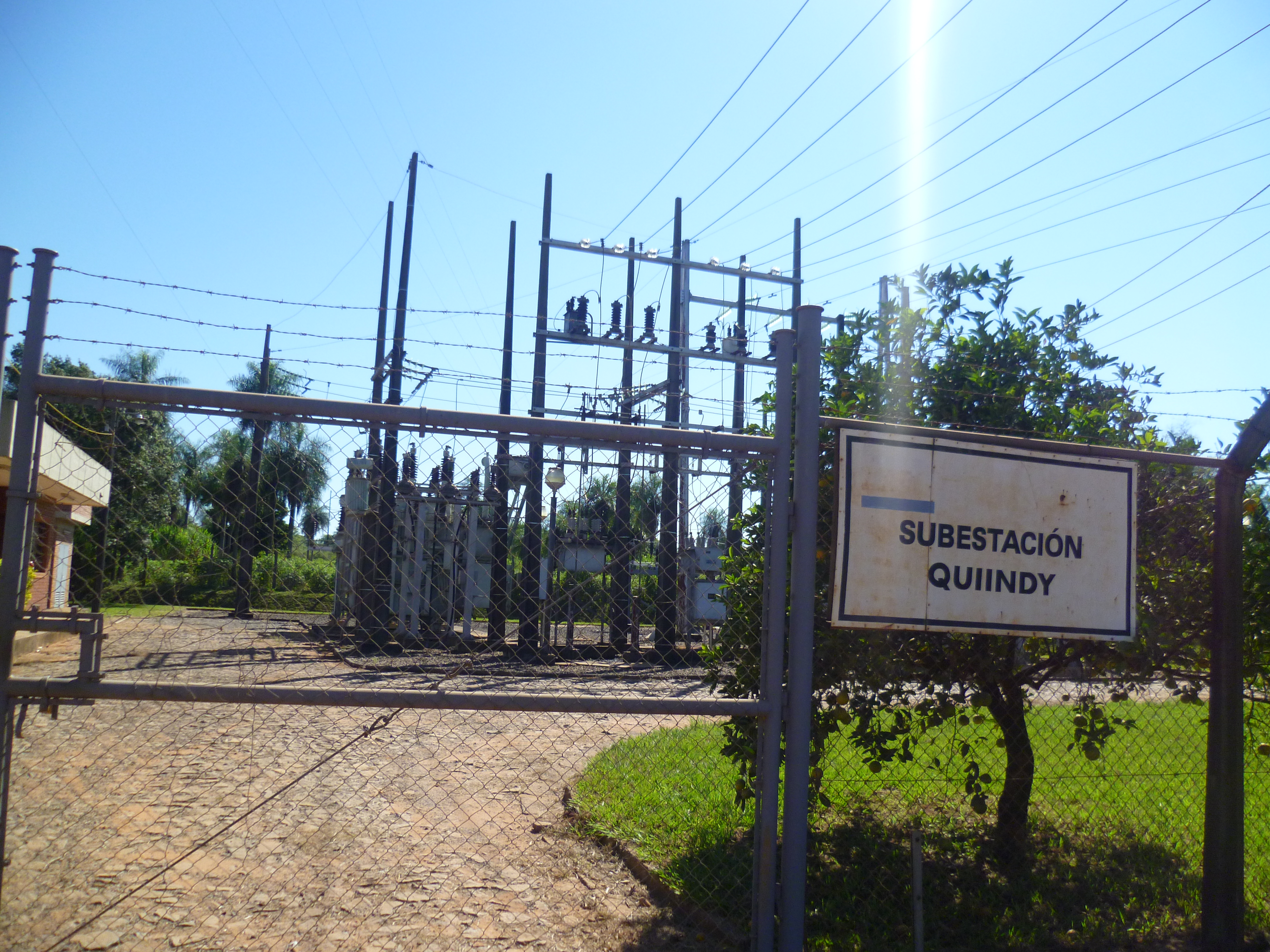
Substation

Administración Nacional de Electricidad (ANDE) is the operator of Paraguay's national electricity grid. They are responsible for the generation, transmission and distribution of energy in Paraguay and have monopoly on these services.

ANDE is an autonomous and decentralized public administration institution, of unlimited duration, with legal status and its own assets. It will be subject to common civil and commercial provisions, in everything that does not contravene the rules contained in Law No. 966 and its subsequent expansion.

== History ==
It was formed on 29 March 1949, as an autonomous state entity with its own legal status

== See also ==
- SITRANDE
