= Central Unitaria de Trabajadores =

Central Unitaria de Trabajadores may refer to:

- Central Union of Workers, a trade union in Colombia
- Central Unitaria de Trabajadores (Paraguay)
- Unified Workers' Centre, a trade union in Chile
