= Augusto Dos Santos =

Paraguayan politician

Augusto dos Santos was the Paraguayan Minister of Communications under President Fernando Lugo.
