= National Christian Union =

The National Christian Union (Spanish: Unión Nacional Cristiana), also known as the White Party (Spanish: Partido Blanco, PB), was a political party in Paraguay.

== History ==
The party was established on 15 May 1987. It contested the 1998 general elections. Its candidate in the presidential elections, Gustavo Bader Ibáñez, received just 0.3% of the vote. However, the party finished third in the Senate elections and won one seat.

The party did not contest the 2003 elections, but returned in the 2008 elections. It did not nominate a presidential candaidate, but received 0.11% of the vote in the Senate election and 0.06% of the vote in the Chamber of Deputies election, failing to win a seat. In the 2013 elections the party nominated Ricardo Almada as its presidential candidate. Almada finished tenth out of eleven candidates with 0.12% of the vote. The party received 0.09% of the vote in the Senate elections and 0.12% in the Chamber election, again failing to win a seat.
