= Great Renewed National Alliance =

Political coalition in Paraguay

Great Renewed National Alliance Gran Alianza Nacional Renovada
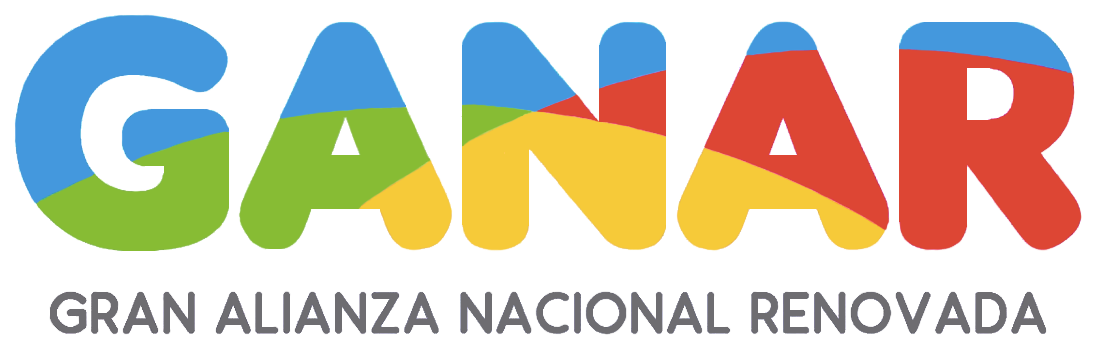
- Founded: 29 September 2017
- Dissolved: 21 May 2018
- Preceded by: Patriotic Alliance for Change (2008)
- Succeeded by: Concertación
- Headquarters: Asunción
- Ideology: Social liberalism Social democracy Democratic socialism Progressivism
- Political position: Centre-left
- Chamber of Deputies: 10 / 80
- Governors: 1 / 17
- Junta Departamental: 48 / 246

Great Renewed National Alliance (Spanish: Gran Alianza Nacional Renovada), also known as GANAR Alliance (Spanish: Alianza GANAR) or by its acronym GANAR (literally "WIN"), is a political coalition of opposition parties, formed in 2017 in Paraguay by members of the Authentic Radical Liberal Party, the Revolutionary Febrerista Party, the Progressive Democratic Party, the Guasú Front, and others. In the 2018 general elections, it was number 5 on the voting list, and supported Efraín Alegre of the PLRA and Leonardo Rubín of the Guasú Front for president and vice president, respectively.

The campaign leader of the Alliance was the liberal Carlos Mateo Balmelli, who was a past rival of Alegre in the PLRA internal elections.
