= Liberalism and radicalism in Paraguay =

Overview of liberal and radical parties with substantial support in Paraguay

This article gives an overview of liberalism and radicalism in Paraguay. It is limited to liberal and radical parties with substantial support, mainly proved by having had a representation in parliament. The sign ⇒ means a reference to another party in that scheme. For inclusion in this scheme it isn't necessary so that parties labeled themselves as a liberal party.

== Introduction ==
Organized liberalism existed in Paraguay since 1870 and is still one of the dominant political forces, though it has not been in government for long time. The Authentic Radical Liberal Party (Partido Liberal Radical Auténtico, member LI) is a left of center liberal party.

== The timeline ==
=== From Great Club of the People to Authentic Radical Liberal Party ===
- 1870: In resistance to the dictator Francisco Solano López liberals form the Great Club of the People (Gran Club del Pueblo)
- 1877: The party is banned.
- 1887: The party is revived as the Democratic Club (Club Democrático), later that year renamed into the Liberal Party (Partido Liberal), led by Cecilio Báez. The party is in power from 1904 until 1936 and from 1939 until 1940.
- 1942: The party is banned, but factions remained active in the illegality.
- 1961: The factions reunited, but a conservative faction formed the Renewal Movement of the Liberal Party (since 1967 Liberal Party).
- 1967: The party is renamed Radical Liberal Party (Partido Liberal Radical).
- 1977: The majority of the party led by Domingo Laino formed the Unified Liberal Party (Partido Liberal Unificado) together with dissidents of the Liberal Party. The Radical Liberal Party continues as a puppet party of the regime.
- 1978: The party is reorganized into the Authentic Radical Liberal Party (Partido Liberal Radical Auténtico).
- 1990: The party absorbed the Liberal Party and the Radical Liberal Party.

== See also ==
- History of Paraguay
- Politics of Paraguay
- List of political parties in Paraguay
