= Kaira mbywangiae =

Scientific classification
- Domain: Eukaryota
- Kingdom: Animalia
- Phylum: Arthropoda
- Subphylum: Chelicerata
- Class: Arachnida
- Order: Araneae
- Infraorder: Araneomorphae
- Family: Araneidae
- Genus: Kaira
- Species: K. mbywangiae

Binomial name
- Kaira mbywangiae Pett & Pai-Gibson, 2024

Species of spider

Kaira mbywangiae is a species of orb-weaver spider found in Southern Paraguay.

== Description ==
Kaira mbywangiae has very distinct tubercles that can be used to identify the species. It has three areas with humps on the abdomen. Each hump has around 1–4 tubercles. Laterally, there are three folds, each with tubercles. The eyes all have a black ring around them. The carapace is beige with darker spots. The abdomen is beige, brown, and has black patches.

== Etymology ==
The specific epithet "mbywangiae" is a tribute to Margarita Mbywangi.
