= Alejandro Hamed =

Paraguayan politician (1934–2023)

Alejandro Hamed Franco

Minister of Foreign Affairs of Paraguay
- In office 2008–2009
- President: Fernando Lugo
- Preceded by: Rubén Ramírez Lezcano
- Succeeded by: Héctor Lacognata

Personal details
- Born: 26 February 1934 Asunción, Paraguay
- Died: 24 April 2023 (aged 89) Montevideo, Uruguay
- Profession: Politician

Alejandro Hamed Franco (26 February 1934 – 24 April 2023) was a Paraguayan politician who was appointed foreign minister by President Fernando Lugo, a term he served between 2008 and 2009. At the time of his death he was nominated to become the next Paraguayan ambassador to Uruguay.

== Biography ==
Alejandro Hamed was born on 26 February 1934. He was of Syrian origin.

Hamed died on 24 April 2023, at the age of 89.

== Political career ==
In 2008, he was controversially appointed as the Minister of Foreign Affairs of Paraguay by incoming president Fernando Lugo. The United States had him on a blacklist from entering the US or flying on American aircraft. After leaving the post in 2009, he was ambassador to Venezuela. As of 2010, he was nominated to become the ambassador to Uruguay.

=== Foreign policy ===
Hamed was said to have "expressed sympathy" for Hugo Chávez, and been an advocate of the Palestinian cause (a move that caused consternation in the United States).

During his tenure as foreign minister, there were concerns that Paraguay would break ties with Taiwan in favour of China, this was controversial because Paraguay was the only country in South America to recognise Taiwan.

During a visit to Jordan, he discussed with his counterpart the Middle East process. He has also visited Qatar. During a visit to Iran, he told his counterpart that Paraguay was willing to make "mature economic, industrial and agricultural cooperation with Iran." He also said Paraguay would support Venezuela's entry into Mercosur. After Barack Obama's inauguration as US president he said Lugo hoped ties with the US would be secure, particularly in the economic field.

Hamed also signed an agreement with the US ambassador to Paraguay, Liliana Ayalde, to amend the Narcotics and Money Laundering Agreement. The new agreement would be used to combat drug trafficking with the US offering US$253,000.

Preceded by Rubén Ramírez Lezcano	Paraguayan Minister of Foreign Affairs; 2008–2009	Succeeded by Héctor Lacognata
