= Federico Acuña =

Federico Acuña may refer to:

- Federico Acuña (footballer) (born 1985), Paraguayan footballer
- Federico Acuña (politician), Paraguayan politician
