= Citizen's Force Movement =

The Citizen's Force Movement (Spanish: Movimiento Fuerza Ciudadana, MFC) was a political party in Paraguay. The party contested the 2003 general elections, receiving 0.5% of the vote for the Senate and Chamber of Deputies but failing to win a seat.
