= Héctor Lacognata =

Paraguayan physician, politician and diplomat (1962–2023)

Minister of Foreign Affairs of Paraguay
- In office 2009–2011

Member of the Chamber of Deputies of Paraguay
- In office 2003–2008

Member of the Mercosur Parliament
- In office 2008–2013

Personal details
- Born: Héctor Ricardo Lacognata Zaragoza; 6 September 1962
- Died: 27 May 2023 (aged 60) La Paz, Bolivia
- Party: Beloved Fatherland Party
- Profession: Physician

Héctor Ricardo Lacognata Zaragoza (6 September 1962 – 27 May 2023) was a Paraguayan physician, politician, and diplomat who served as Minister of Foreign Affairs of Paraguay from 2009 to 2011. He was also a member of the Chamber of Deputies of Paraguay and later represented the country in the Mercosur Parliament. He was affiliated with the Beloved Fatherland Party and held elected office from 2003 to 2008, then moved into regional and diplomatic roles. After serving as foreign minister during the presidency of Fernando Lugo, he was appointed Paraguay’s ambassador to Bolivia in 2019.

== Career ==
Lacognata trained as a medical doctor and specialised in paediatrics and paediatric intensive care.

He later entered politics as a member of the Beloved Fatherland Party and served in the Chamber of Deputies from 2003 to 2008. He subsequently represented Paraguay in the Mercosur Parliament from 2008 to 2013.

During Fernando Lugo's presidency, Lacognata was appointed Minister of Foreign Affairs, serving from 2009 to 2011.

In 2019, he was appointed Paraguay’s ambassador to Bolivia by President Mario Abdo Benítez. He later served as minister at the Paraguayan embassy in La Paz, acting as the second-ranking official in the diplomatic mission.

== Death ==
Lacognata died on 27 May 2023 at the age of 60 in La Paz, where he was residing in a hotel while on diplomatic duty. He was found unresponsive in his hotel room, and medical personnel determined that he had died several hours before being discovered.

The exact cause of death was not immediately confirmed, although it was believed to be related to pre-existing health conditions, including cancer and diabetes. Paraguayan authorities coordinated with his family regarding the repatriation of his remains.

Following his death, the Senate of Paraguay observed a minute of silence in his memory.
