= María Victoria Brusquetti =

Paraguayan activist and politician (born c.1940)

María Victoria Brusquetti (born c.1940) is a Paraguayan activist and politician. She stood as vice-presidential candidate on behalf of the National Encounter Party (Partido Encuentro Nacional) in the 1993 Paraguayan general election, making her the first woman to be a candidate for Vice President of Paraguay.

Brusquetti was a leader of Catholic lay workers, a "long-time organizer from the Catholic grass-roots movement". On 27 November 1992 Guillermo Caballero Vargas, leader of the National Encounter independent movement, selected her to be his running-mate in the 1993 Presidential elections.
