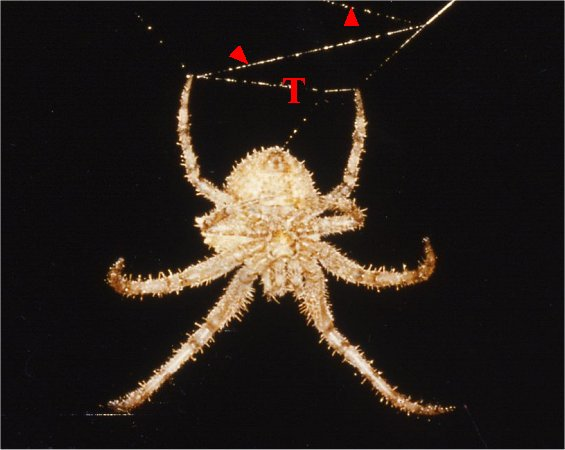

Scientific classification
- Kingdom: Animalia
- Phylum: Arthropoda
- Subphylum: Chelicerata
- Class: Arachnida
- Order: Araneae
- Infraorder: Araneomorphae
- Family: Araneidae
- Genus: Kaira
- Species: K. alba

Binomial name
- Kaira alba (Hentz, 1850)

= Kaira alba =

Species of spider

Kaira alba, the pale frilled orbweaver, is a species of orb weaver in the family Araneidae. It is found in the US and Mexico.
