= Federico Acuña (politician) =

Paraguayan politician

Interior Minister of Paraguay
- In office 17 June 2011 – 25 August 2011
- Preceded by: Rafael Filizzola
- Succeeded by: Carlos Filizzola

Personal details
- Born: San Pedro del Paraná

Federico Acuña Araújo is a Paraguayan politician. He briefly served as Interior Minister under President Fernando Lugo in 2011, from 17 June to 25 August. He had previously been Chief of the National Police from 19 August 2008 to 24 November 2008.

== Biography ==
He was born in San Pedro del Paraná. In 2009, he was accused by former Interior Minister Rafael Filizzola of turning a blind eye to corruption during his tenure as Police Chief.
