= Workers' Party (Paraguay) =

Political party in Paraguay

Workers' Party Partido de los Trabajadores
- President: Ñeco Balbuena
- Founded: 19 March 1989
- Headquarters: Hernandarias 890, Asunción, Paraguay
- Ideology: Trotskyism
- Political position: Far-left

The Workers' Party (Spanish: Partido de los Trabajadores, PT) is a Trotskyist political party in Paraguay.

== History ==
The party was established on 19 March 1989. It first contested national elections in 1991, when it received 0.6% of the vote in the Constitutional Assembly elections, finishing sixth but failing to win a seat. It again failed to win a seat in the 1993 general elections, in which its candidate for president, Eduardo Arce, finished fourth with 0.2%. The party did not contest the 1998 or 2003 elections, but had a candidate in 2008 presidential elections. However, party candidate, Julio López finished last with just 0.1% of the vote.
