= National Renewal Movement (Paraguay) =

Political party in Paraguay

The National Renewal Movement (Spanish: Movimiento de Renovación Nacional, MORENA) was an evangelical Christian political party in Paraguay.

It contested the 1998 general elections, although it only nominated Chamber of Deputies candidates in Asunción and Central Department. It finished fourth in both the Senate and Chamber of Deputies elections with 1.5% and 1.1% of the vote, but failed to win a seat in either. The party did not contest any further elections.
