= Kaira altiventer =

Scientific classification
- Domain: Eukaryota
- Kingdom: Animalia
- Phylum: Arthropoda
- Subphylum: Chelicerata
- Class: Arachnida
- Order: Araneae
- Infraorder: Araneomorphae
- Family: Araneidae
- Genus: Kaira
- Species: K. altiventer

Binomial name
- Kaira altiventer O. P.-Cambridge, 1889

Species of spider

Kaira altiventer is a species of orb weaver in the family of spiders known as Araneidae. It is found in a range from the United States to Brazil.
