= Luis Bareiro Spaini =

Paraguayan Minister of National Defense

Luis Bareiro Spaini served as a Paraguayan Minister of National Defense under President Fernando Lugo until 2010. He is rumored to be planning a run for president.
