= Carlos Filizzola =

Paraguayan politician (born 1959)

Carlos Filizzola OL
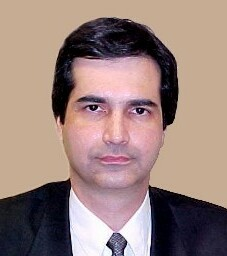
- Official portrait, 2003

Senator of Paraguay
- In office 15 June 2012 – 30 June 2023
- In office 30 June 2003 – 26 August 2011

Interior Minister of Paraguay
- In office 26 August 2011 – 15 June 2012
- Preceded by: Federico Acuña
- Succeeded by: Rubén Candia Amarilla

President of the Senate of Paraguay
- In office 1 July 2005 – 30 June 2006
- Preceded by: Miguel Carrizosa
- Succeeded by: Enrique González Quintana

Mayor of Asunción
- In office 26 June 1991 – 17 December 1996
- Preceded by: José Luis Alder
- Succeeded by: Martin Burt

Personal details
- Born: Carlos Alberto Filizzola Pallarés; 24 July 1959 (age 67) Asunción, Paraguay
- Party: Party for a Country of Solidarity (since 2000)
- Other political affiliations: Guasú Front (since 2010); National Encounter Party (1996–2000); Asunción for Everyone (1991–1996)
- Children: 3
- Parents: Francisco Filizzola; Alba Pallarés
- Relatives: Rafael Filizzola (cousin)
- Education: Universidad Nacional de Asunción
- Occupation: Medical doctor; union leader; politician
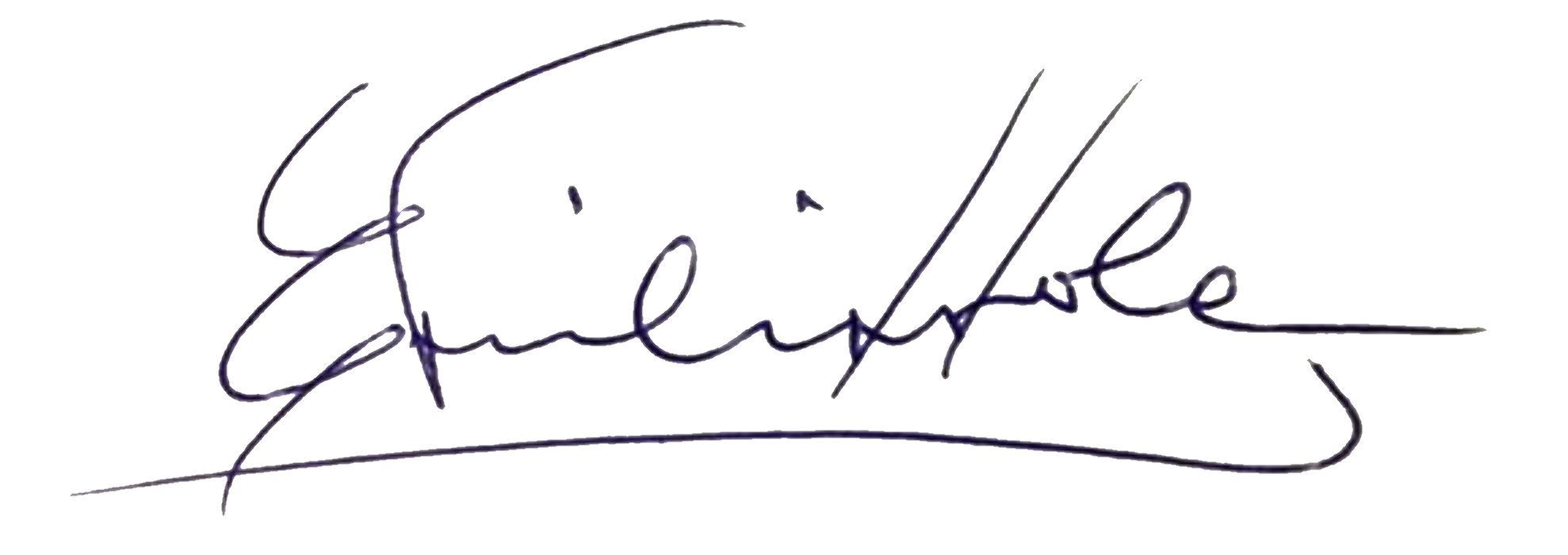
- Signature

Carlos Alberto Filizzola Pallarés (born 24 July 1959) is a Paraguayan physician, labor unionist and politician who served as mayor of Asunción from 1991 to 1996, being the first one to be democratically elected. He later served four terms as senator, from 2003 to 2011 and again from 2012 to 2023, having been appointed Minister of the Interior in the meantime, under the presidency of Fernando Lugo. He was also the President of the Senate from 2005 to 2006 and the running mate of Domingo Laíno in the 1998 presidential election.

Born into a wealthy family with links to Alfredo Stroessner, Filizzola came to oppose the dictatorship, first as a student leader and later through unions, organizing protests such as the Clinicazo of 1986.

A self-described socialist, Filizzola was one of the main faces of the Paraguayan left during his political career. He was president of the National Encounter Party from 1996 to 1999, a big tent party where he had his own leftist faction. In 2000 that faction broke off, founding Filizzola's very own Party for a Country of Solidarity.

== Early life ==
=== Family ===
Carlos Alberto FIlizzola Pallarés was born in Asunción, on 24 July 1959, to Francisco Filizzola and Alba Pallarés. From his father's side he is of Italian ancestry. His cousin, Rafael Filizzola, is also a politician.

In 1980, Francisco Filizzola received around ten thousand acres of public land from Alfredo Stroessner. Carlos, who opposed the dictatorship, opted to give back the lands after inheriting them.

Filizzola had two sons with his first wife and later a daughter with his domestic partner, the model Paola Colmán.

=== Education ===
He attended the private Ghoette School, where he was elected president of the student council in 1977.

He is a medical doctor, having graduated from the Universidad Nacional de Asunción in 1985. There he also served as president of the student council, from 1984 to 1985, as well as president of the medical students union, from 1982 to 1984. From these positions he actively opposed the dictatorship, that had by then entered a phase of steep decline.

=== Union career ===
In the late 1980s Filizzola opposed the dictatorship of Alfredo Stroessner as a union leader. He served as president of the Medics Association of the Hospital de Clínicas from 1986 to 1988. From this position he led the Clinicazo, a large protest against the increasingly weak regime.

After the fall of Stroessner, Filizzola served as Assistant Secretary General of the Central Unitaria de Trabajadores from its creation in 1989 until his election as mayor in 1991.

== Political career ==
=== Mayor of Asunción (1991-1996) ===
==== 1991 mayoral election ====
Up until 1990, all mayors of all cities in Paraguay were appointed by the president. The first municipal elections in Paraguayan history were held on 26 May 1991, resulting in the election of Carlos FIlizzola, of the Asunción for Everyone Movement, elected mayor of Asunción, the nation's capital. He won 34% of the vote, beating the colorado Juan Manuel Morales (27%), the liberal Félix "Pon" Bogado Gondra (20%) and the febrerista Euclides Acevedo (10%). Filizzola became the first democratically elected mayor of Asunción, as well as the first leftist one.

==== Removal of the monument to Alfredo Stroessner ====
One of Filizzola's first deeds as mayor was to order the removal of the statue of Alfredo Stroessner situated in the monument atop Lambaré Hill. Filizzola argued that the statue was illegal, since according to Law 2719/90 the Government could not erect monuments of living people (at the time Stroessner was alive, exiled in Brasilia).

The toppling was difficult, since the statue was large and heavy. This eventually attracted a lot of news reporters and onlookers, which then attracted Stroessner supporters, opposed to the toppling. Eventually the commotion led to President Andrés Rodríguez, who couped Stroessner, calling Filizzola to pause the removal and discuss the matter with him. In the morning of 8 October, Filizzola gave a press conference outside the Palacio de López, communicating that the president approved of the removal, and that he apologized for interrupting it. Later that day the statue was cut off at foot level, tied by the neck and brought down with a crane. Several people climbed on top of the statue, which was lying on the floor, to dance and celebrate.

The statue was given to artist Carlos Colombino, who used it to make a sculpture in honor of the victims of the dictatorship, which was inaugurated in 1995 and is currently in the Park of the Disappeared.

==== Infrastructure works ====
Cultural centers were inaugurated, such as the Manzana de la Rivera and the Paraguayan-Japanese Cultural Center. He implemented the use of concrete for road paving, seeking to improve the quality and durability of the streets. Among his works are also the Franja Costera for the zones of Asunción prone to flooding and the Environmental Development Plan of Asunción.

His most controversial work, which is remembered to this day, was the renovation of Democracy Square, a large public space located in downtown Asunción, built in the 1960s. The renovation saw the removal of most of its vegetation and the large fountain that sat in the middle. This was made in order to build a parking lot, which was meant to solve the city's problems related to parking, it didn't. The renovation was unveiled on 21 April 1995 in a ceremony led by Filizzola and President Juan Carlos Wasmosy, who praised it. Public opinion turned sharply against Filizzola's renovation, which remains controversial.

==== Other works ====
He supported cultural demonstrations and the creation of comisiones vecinales. Furthermore, during his administration the number of public officials doubled, from 2,200 to 4,400, which led Filizzola being accused of filling the municipality with members of Asunción for Everyone. The increase in bureaucrats can also be due to the creation of more municipal departments, such as the Environmental Department.

During his mayoralty, Filizzola was elected a member of the World Economic Forum, advisory member of the board of directors of the Ibero-American Organization of Intermunicipal Cooperation and executive secretary of the Mercociudades Organization. He was also vice president of the Paraguayan Organization of Intermunicipal Cooperation (OPACI) from 1994 to 1996 and president of the Association of Municipalities of the Metropolitan Area (AMUAM) in 1995 and 1996.

=== 1998 vice presidential campaign ===
In 1996, Filizzola became the president of the National Encounter Party, this made him the head of the third largest force in Paraguayan politics at the time. That same year he formed his own faction within the party, called Participación Amplia, Integración Solidaridad (PAIS).

In 1998, Filizzola formed an alliance with the liberals, becoming the running mate of Domingo Laíno, who was running for president for a third consecutive time. Laíno lost once again, this time to Raúl Cubas and Luis María Argaña, who united the Colorado Party under one ticket.

In March 1999, Filizzola was replaced as president of the National Encounter Party by Euclides Acevedo.

=== Senator (2003-2011) ===
In 2000, Filizzola left the National Encounter Party, taking his faction with him to form his own party, the Party for a Country of Solidarity. In 2003 Filizzola was elected Senator, along with José Morínigo Alcaraz, giving his party two seats in the Senate. In 2008 he was reelected for a second term, the same year Fernando Lugo became the first leftist elected president.

In 2010, Filizzola was one of the founders of the Guasú Front, a coalition of political parties created to unite the scattered Paraguayan left and support President Lugo without the need of the liberals. Filizzola was initially chosen by the Guasú Front as their candidate for mayor of Asunción in the 2010 municipal elections, however, out of fear of losing his seat in the Senate, they replaced him with Ricardo Canese.

=== Minister of the Interior (2011-2012) ===
On 26 August 2011, President Fernando Lugo appointed Filizzola Minister of the Interior, replacing his cousin Rafael Filizzola. Filizzola's seat in the Senate was taken by Samuel García Paniagua.

Filizzola served as Interior Minister in a uniquely turbulent time, marked by increasingly violent clashes between landowners and landless farmers who occupied lands that were taken away from them by the Stroessner regime. The violence reached its peak on 15 June 2012, when a confrontation killed six police officers and eleven occupiers, this came to be known as the Curuguaty Massacre. The events of Curuguaty led to a political crisis, were both Lugo and Filizzola were kicked out of office by the Congress through impeachment. Filizzola went back to his seat in the Senate.

=== Senator (2012-2023) ===
In 2013, Filizzola was elected for a third term in the Senate, this time as a member of the Guasú Front and no longer an ally of the liberals. That election also brought Horacio Cartes to power.

In March 2017, the Guasú Front, including Filizzola, allied with President Horacio Cartes and his faction of the Colorado Party to pass a constitutional amendment that would allow the president to run for a second term. The Guasú Front did this so Lugo could run in the 2018 election, even if it could backfire by giving Cartes five more years in office. The amendment was extremely controversial, since reelection was intentionally banned by the constitution, written in 1992, out of fear of another dictatorship like that of Stroessner, who was president for eight terms. Hundreds of protestors, furious at the cartistas and the Guasú Front, demanded the amendment be stopped, eventually burning down part of the Congress. After weeks of violence throughout April, which included the death of an unarmed civilian at the hands of police, the crisis ended when Cartes gave up and announced he would no longer seek reelection. FIlizzola, however, maintains his position to this day, claiming the process was legal and democratic, blaming the violence on those opposed to the amendment.

In 2018 Filizzola won a fourth term. He then ran for a fifth term in the 2023 general election, but lost, ending his decades-long career in the Senate.
