= San Solano =

Village in Paraguay

Coordinates: 26°56′41.6″S 56°44′8.9″W

San Solano is a small rural village that is located in the San Pedro del Paraná district, Itapúa department in Paraguay. It is the hometown of former Paraguayan president Fernando Armindo Lugo Méndez.
