= Amazonepeira =

Scientific classification
- Kingdom: Animalia
- Phylum: Arthropoda
- Subphylum: Chelicerata
- Class: Arachnida
- Order: Araneae
- Infraorder: Araneomorphae
- Family: Araneidae
- Genus: Amazonepeira; Levi, 1989

Type species
- A. herrera Levi, 1989

Species
- 5, see text

Genus of spiders

Amazonepeira is a genus of South American orb-weaver spiders first described by Herbert Walter Levi in 1989.

== Species ==
As of November 2026 it contains five species:

- Amazonepeira beno Levi, 1994 – Ecuador, Brazil, Suriname
- Amazonepeira callaria (Levi, 1991) – Peru, Bolivia, Brazil
- Amazonepeira herrera Levi, 1989 – Peru, Brazil
- Amazonepeira manaus Levi, 1994 – Brazil
- Amazonepeira masaka Levi, 1994 – Ecuador, Brazil.
