= Margarita Mbywangi =

Paraguayan politician

Margarita Mbywangi (born 1962) is a Paraguayan politician and an Aché indigenous leader, who was appointed the Minister of Indigenous Affairs in Paraguay in 2008.

== About ==
Mbywangi was born in 1962 and has three children. Mbywangi's main goals have focused on gaining indigenous land rights, protecting Paraguay's forested lands, and improving indigenous peoples' access to potable water, food and health care. Margarita is also a skilled poet and was quoted by BBC as saying "For an Indian the forest represents 'his mother, his life, his present and future'".

On August 18, 2008, Paraguayan President Fernando Lugo named Margarita Mbywangi, a member of the Aché indigenous group of eastern Paraguay, as Minister of Indigenous Affairs, the first indigenous person to hold such a position in Paraguay.

According to various news sources, at the age of four she was captured in the jungle near the Aché community of Chupapou and was sold several times into forced labour to families of hacienda owners. She was sent to school, so she learned to read and write, and in 2008 was studying for a high school diploma.

The mother-of-three promised to meet with those who opposed her appointment, and in order to ease their concerns, she said "We are immediately going to help colleagues from different communities who are experiencing a difficult situation due to lack of potable water, food and clothing."
