= Rafael Filizzola =

Paraguayan politician (born 1968)

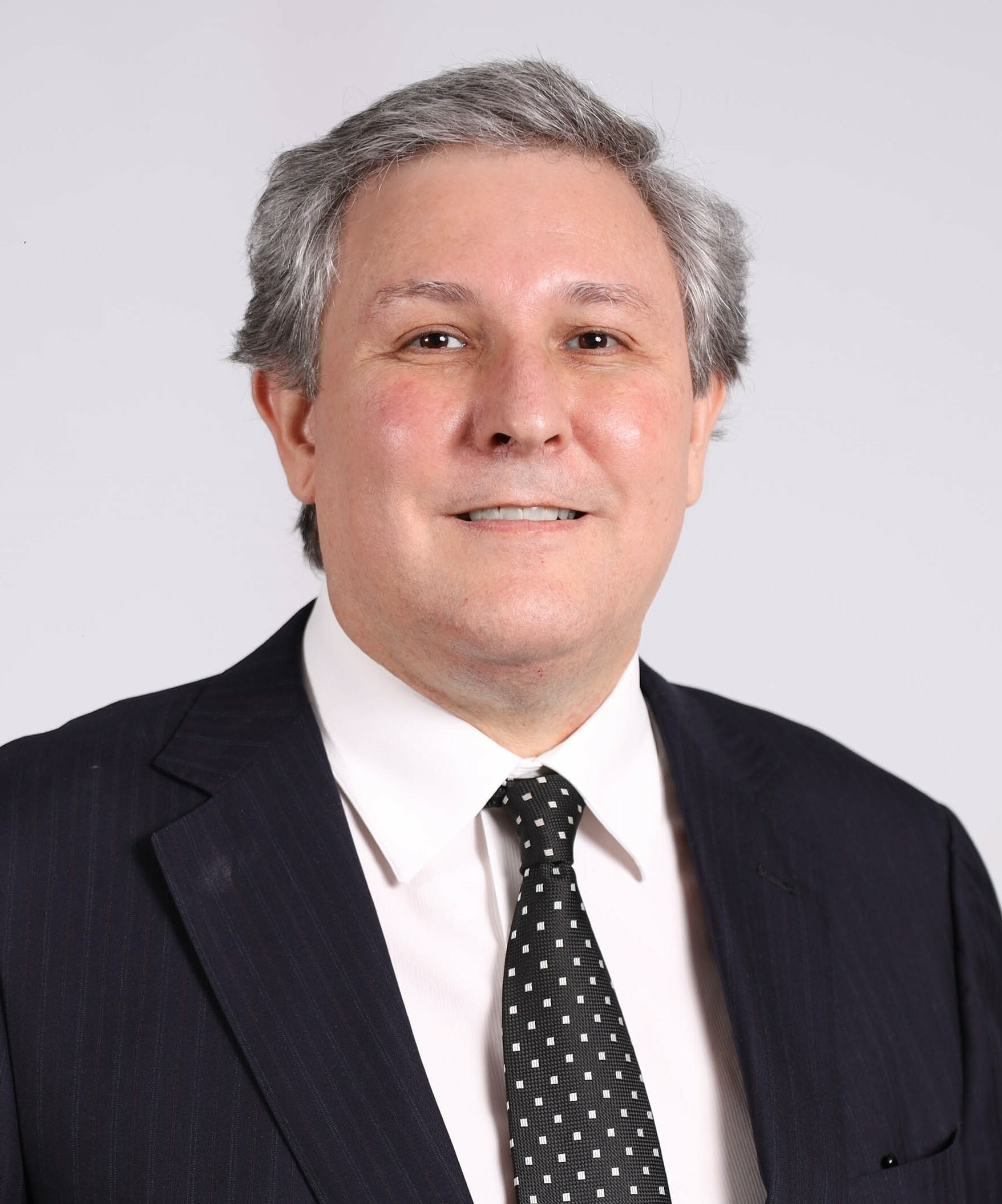
- Official portrait, 2023

Senator of Paraguay
- Incumbent
- Assumed office 30 June 2023

Interior Minister of Paraguay
- In office August 15, 2008 – 16 June 2011
- President: Fernando Lugo
- Preceded by: Libio Florentín
- Succeeded by: Federico Acuña

National Deputy of Paraguay from Asunción
- In office 30 June 1998 – 30 June 2008

Personal details
- Born: Rafael Augusto Filizzola Serra; 16 February 1968 (age 58) Asunción, Paraguay
- Party: Democratic Progressive Party
- Spouse: Desirée Masi (m. 1996)
- Children: 2

Rafael Augusto Filizzola Serra (born 16 February 1968) is a Paraguayan politician, currently serving as senator since 2023.

He previously served as the Paraguayan interior minister under President Fernando Lugo, from 2008 to 2011. He was a member of the Chamber of Deputies of Paraguay from 1998 to 2008, and elected to the Senate of Paraguay in 2008, although he was not sworn in, having resigned his seat in order to become interior minister.

In 2007, Filizzola and his wife, Desirée Masi, founded their own political party, the Democratic Progressive Party.

In 2009, he accused Federico Acuña (who in 2011 would become his successor), of turning a blind eye to corruption during Acuña's period in office in 2008 as National Police Chief.

Filizzola is the cousin of Carlos Filizzola, also a Paraguayan politician.
