= 2003 Paraguayan general election =

← 1998	27 April 2003	2008 →
- President
- Turnout: 64.29% (▲3.57pp)
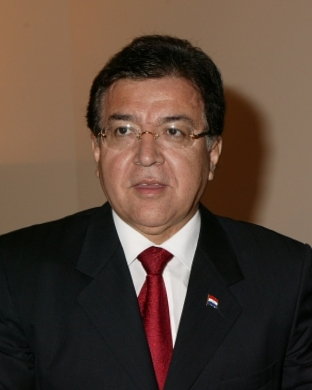

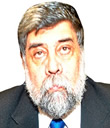

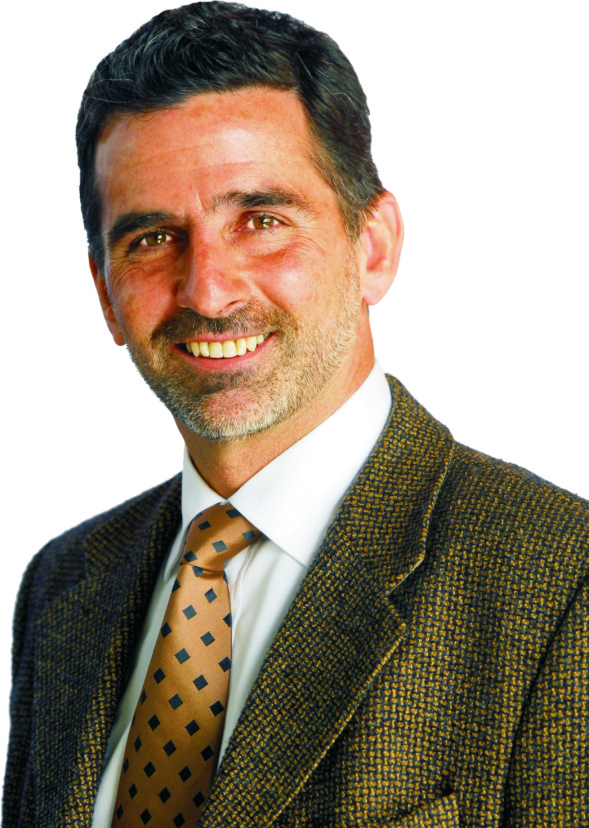
Candidate	Nicanor Duarte	Julio César Franco
Party	Colorado	PLRA
Popular vote	574,232	370,348
Percentage	38.30%	24.70%
Candidate	Pedro Fadul	Guillermo Sánchez Guffanti
Party	PPQ	UNACE
Popular vote	328,916	208,391
Percentage	21.94%	13.90%
- Results by department
President before election
Luis Ángel González Macchi
Colorado
President-elect
Nicanor Duarte
Colorado
- Chamber of Deputies
- All 80 seats in the Chamber of Deputies; 41 seats needed for a majority
Party	Leader	Vote %	Seats	+/–
Colorado	Nicanor Duarte	35.27	37	−8
PLRA	Julio César Franco	25.67	21	−5
PPQ	Pedro Fadul	15.29	10	New
UNACE	Guillermo Sánchez Guffanti	14.68	10	New
PPS	Diego Abente Brun	3.34	2	New
This lists parties that won seats. See the complete results below.
- Senate
- All 45 seats in the Senate; 23 seats needed for a majority
Party	Vote %	Seats	+/–
Colorado	34.44	16	−8
PLRA	25.39	12	−1
PPQ	15.90	7	New
UNACE	14.30	7	New
PEN	2.11	1	−6
This lists parties that won seats. See the complete results below.

General elections were held in Paraguay on 27 April 2003. The presidential elections were won by Nicanor Duarte of the Colorado Party, who received 38% of the vote. In the Congressional elections, the Colorado Party won 37 of the 80 seats in the Chamber of Deputies and 16 of the 45 seats in the Senate. Voter turnout was 64%.

== Results ==
=== President ===
Candidate	Party	Votes	%
Nicanor Duarte	Colorado Party	574,232	38.30
Julio César Franco	Authentic Radical Liberal Party	370,348	24.70
Pedro Fadul	Beloved Fatherland Party	328,916	21.94
Guillermo Sánchez Guffanti	National Union of Ethical Citizens	208,391	13.90
Diego Abente Brun	National Encounter Party	8,745	0.58
Tomás Zayas Roa	Partido Patria Libre	4,559	0.30
Pedro Almada Galeano	Broad Front Party	1,443	0.10
Guillermo Gustavo Hellmers Weiler	Independent Democratic Force	1,370	0.09
Teresa Notario	Paraguayan Humanist Party	1,196	0.08
Total		1,499,200	100.00
Valid votes		1,499,200	96.96
Invalid/blank votes		46,992	3.04
Total votes		1,546,192	100.00
Registered voters/turnout		2,405,108	64.29
Source: Justicia Electoral

=== Senate ===
Party	Votes	%	Seats	+/–
Colorado Party	508,506	34.44	16	–8
Authentic Radical Liberal Party	374,854	25.39	12	–1
Beloved Fatherland Party	234,748	15.90	7	New
National Union of Ethical Citizens	211,078	14.30	7	New
Party for a Country of Solidarity	67,462	4.57	0	New
National Encounter Party	31,212	2.11	1	–6
Partido Patria Libre	16,151	1.09	0	New
Revolutionary Febrerista Party	10,202	0.69	0	New
Citizen's Force Movement	6,766	0.46	0	New
Independent Party in Action	3,791	0.26	0	New
Paraguayan Humanist Party	3,515	0.24	0	New
Christian Democratic Party	3,010	0.20	0	0
Broad Front Party	2,828	0.19	0	New
Independent Democratic Force	2,284	0.15	0	New
Total	1,476,407	100.00	43	0
Valid votes	1,476,407	95.61		
Invalid/blank votes	67,815	4.39		
Total votes	1,544,222	100.00		
Registered voters/turnout	2,405,108	64.21		
Source: Nohlen

=== Chamber of Deputies ===
Results by department

Party	Votes	%	Seats	+/–
Colorado Party	520,761	35.27	37	–8
Authentic Radical Liberal Party	379,066	25.67	21	–5
Beloved Fatherland Party	225,811	15.29	10	New
National Union of Ethical Citizens	216,803	14.68	10	New
Party for a Country of Solidarity	49,280	3.34	2	New
National Encounter Party	39,372	2.67	0	–9
Partido Patria Libre	16,480	1.12	0	New
Revolutionary Febrerista Party	11,542	0.78	0	New
Citizen's Force Movement	6,749	0.46	0	New
Paraguayan Humanist Party	2,867	0.19	0	New
Broad Front Party	2,670	0.18	0	New
Independent Party in Action	1,978	0.13	0	New
Christian Democratic Party	1,927	0.13	0	0
Independent Democratic Force	1,302	0.09	0	New
Total	1,476,608	100.00	80	0
Valid votes	1,476,608	95.75		
Invalid/blank votes	65,564	4.25		
Total votes	1,542,172	100.00		
Registered voters/turnout	2,405,108	64.12		
Source: Nohlen
