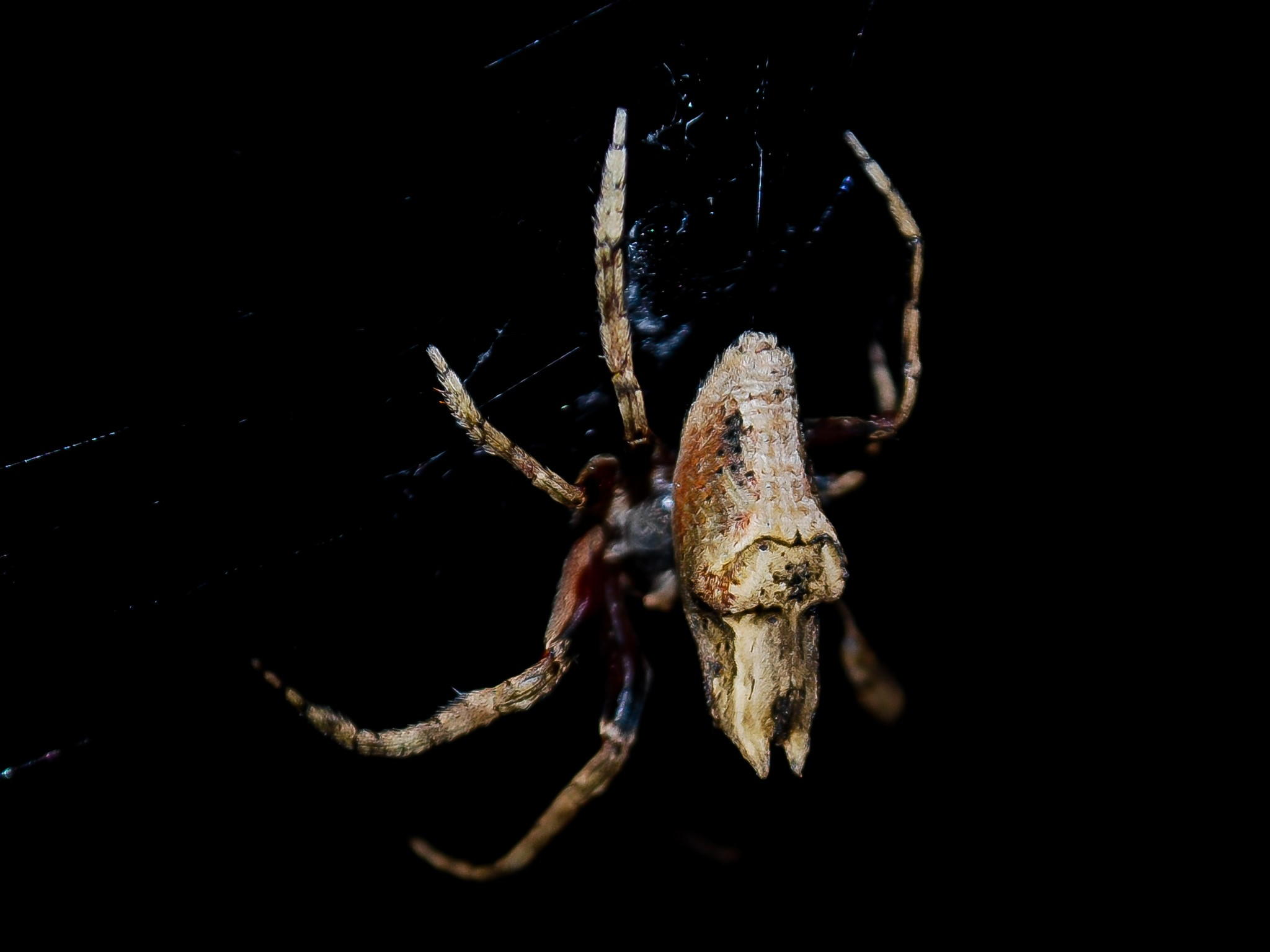
- Pozonia bacillifera

Scientific classification
- Domain: Eukaryota
- Kingdom: Animalia
- Phylum: Arthropoda
- Subphylum: Chelicerata
- Class: Arachnida
- Order: Araneae
- Infraorder: Araneomorphae
- Family: Araneidae
- Genus: Pozonia; Schenkel, 1953

Species
- 5, see text

= Pozonia =

Genus of spiders

Pozonia is a genus of orb-weaver spiders first described by E. Schenkel in 1953.

== Species ==
As of April 2019 it contains five species:

- Pozonia andujari Alayón, 2007 – Hispaniola
- Pozonia bacillifera (Simon, 1897) – Trinidad to Paraguay
- Pozonia balam Estrada-Alvarez, 2015 – Mexico
- Pozonia dromedaria (O. Pickard-Cambridge, 1893) – Mexico to Panama
- Pozonia nigroventris (Bryant, 1936) – Mexico to Panama, Cuba, Jamaica
