= 1998 Paraguayan general election =

← 1993	10 May 1998	2003 →
- Presidential election
- Turnout: 80.54% (▲11.18pp)
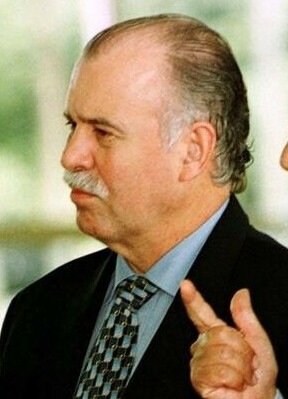

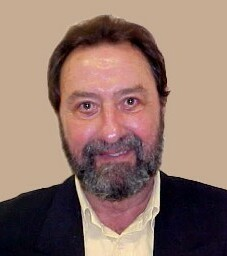
Candidate	Raúl Cubas Grau	Domingo Laíno
Party	Colorado	DA (PLRA–PEN)
Popular vote	887,196	703,379
Percentage	55.35%	43.88%
- Results by department
President before election
Juan Carlos Wasmosy
Colorado
President-elect
Raúl Cubas Grau
Colorado
- Chamber of Deputies
- All 80 seats in the Chamber of Deputies; 41 seats needed for a majority
Party	Leader	Vote %	Seats	+/–
Colorado	Raúl Cubas Grau	53.78	45	+7
AD (PLRA–PEN)	Domingo Laíno	42.77	35	−7
This lists parties that won seats. See the complete results below.
- Senate
- All 45 seats in the Senate; 23 seats needed for a majority
Party	Vote %	Seats	+/–
Colorado	51.74	24	+4
AD (PLRA–PEN)	42.10	20	−5
PB	2.3	1	New
This lists parties that won seats. See the complete results below.

General elections were held in Paraguay on 10 May 1998. Incumbent Juan Carlos Wasmosy could not run again, as the constitution limits the president to a single five-year term with no possibility of re-election.

The presidential elections were won by Raúl Cubas Grau of the Colorado Party, who received 55% of the vote. In the Congressional elections, the Colorado Party won 45 of the 80 seats in the Chamber of Deputies and 24 of the 45 seats in the Senate, defeating the Democratic Alliance formed by the Authentic Radical Liberal Party and the National Encounter Party. Voter turnout was 80.5%.

To date, this is the only time since the restoration of democracy in Paraguay that a presidential candidate has been elected with a majority of the vote.

== Results ==
=== President ===
Candidate	Party	Votes	%
Raúl Cubas Grau	Colorado Party	887,196	55.35
Domingo Laíno	Democratic Alliance (PLRA–PEN)	703,379	43.88
Luis Alberto Campos Doria	Revolutionary Febrerista Party	8,139	0.51
Gustavo Bader Ibáñez	National Christian Union	4,192	0.26
Total		1,602,906	100.00
Valid votes		1,602,906	97.10
Invalid/blank votes		47,819	2.90
Total votes		1,650,725	100.00
Registered voters/turnout		2,049,449	80.54
Source: Justicia Electoral

=== Senate ===
Party	Votes	%	Seats	+/–
Colorado Party	813,287	51.74	24	+4
Democratic Alliance (PLRA–PEN)	661,764	42.10	20	–5
National Christian Union	36,424	2.32	1	New
National Renewal Movement	23,844	1.52	0	New
Christian Democratic Party	19,891	1.27	0	New
Revolutionary Febrerista Party	16,667	1.06	0	New
Total	1,571,877	100.00	45	0
Valid votes	1,571,877	95.33		
Invalid/blank votes	77,003	4.67		
Total votes	1,648,880	100.00		
Registered voters/turnout	2,049,449	80.45		
Source: Nohle

=== Chamber of Deputies ===
Party	Votes	%	Seats	+/–
Colorado Party	857,473	53.78	45	+7
Democratic Alliance (PLRA–PEN)	681,917	42.77	35	–7
Revolutionary Febrerista Party	20,121	1.26	0	New
National Renewal Movement	16,863	1.06	0	New
Christian Democratic Party	9,249	0.58	0	New
National Christian Union	8,791	0.55	0	New
Total	1,594,414	100.00	80	0
Valid votes	1,594,414	96.67		
Invalid/blank votes	55,005	3.33		
Total votes	1,649,419	100.00		
Registered voters/turnout	2,049,449	80.48		
Source: Nohlen
