= Patriotic Alliance for Change =

Electoral alliance in Paraguay

Patriotic Alliance For Change Alianza Patriótica para el Cambio
- Leader: Fernando Lugo
- Founded: 2007
- Dissolved: 2010
- Succeeded by: Guasú Front
- Headquarters: Asunción
- Ideology: Social democracy Democratic socialism Progressivism
- Political position: Centre-left

The Patriotic Alliance for Change (Spanish: Alianza Patriótica por el Cambio, APC) was a Paraguayan electoral alliance.

Its candidate in the 2008 election was Fernando Lugo, who won the election.

== Composition ==
Its members included:

- Febrerista Revolutionary Party
- National Encounter Party
- Party for a Country of Solidarity
- Christian Democratic Party
- Movement for Socialism
- Broad Front

Former members, at the time of the 2008 election:

- Authentic Radical Liberal Party
- Progressive Democratic Party
