= Progressive Democratic Party (Paraguay) =

Political party in Paraguay

Progressive Democratic Party Partido Democrático Progresista
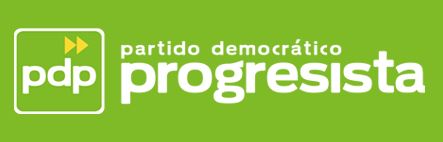
- Leader: Desirée Masi
- Founded: 2007
- Split from: Party for a Country of Solidarity
- Headquarters: Asunción, Paraguay
- Ideology: Democratic socialism Social democracy
- Political position: Centre-left
- National affiliation: Concertación
- International affiliation: Socialist International
- Chamber of Deputies: 0 / 80
- Senate: 1 / 45

Website
- www.pdp.org.py

The Progressive Democratic Party (Spanish: Partido Democrático Progresista) is a Paraguayan political party created in 2007, split from the Party for a Country of Solidarity.

In the 2008 Paraguayan general election it won one seat in the Chamber of Deputies of Paraguay and one in the Senate of Paraguay. In the 2008 elections it was part of the Patriotic Alliance for Change electoral coalition, and had a representative, Rafael Filizzola, appointed interior minister. It withdrew from the governing coalition in early 2009, although it continued to participate as an observer, and to support the Lugo presidency. Filizzola remained interior minister until mid-2011, when Lugo asked him to resign.
