= Party for a Country of Solidarity =

Political party in Paraguay

Solidary Country Party Partido País Solidario
- Leader: Carlos Filizzola Pallarés
- Founded: 2000
- Split from: National Encounter Party
- Headquarters: San José street, Asunción, Paraguay
- Youth wing: Solidary Country Youth
- Ideology: Democratic socialism Social democracy
- Political position: Centre-left to left-wing
- National affiliation: Concertación
- Regional affiliation: São Paulo Forum
- International affiliation: Progressive Alliance
- Chamber of Deputies: 1 / 80
- Senate: 0 / 45

Website
- www.paissolidario.org.py

The Party for a Country of Solidarity (Spanish: Partido País Solidario, PPS) is a political party in Paraguay. It was formed in 2000 when a faction of the National Encounter Party led by Carlos Filizzola broke away to create a new party.

== History ==
The party originated in 1996 as a faction of the National Encounter Party, the Movimiento Participación Amplia, Integración Solidaridad (PAIS). In 2000 Filizzola, who had been the National Encounter Party's President from April 1996 to March 1999, led the faction out of the National Encounter Party to form the Party for a Country of Solidarity.

The party first contested national elections in 2003, when it won two seats in the Chamber of Deputies with 3.3% of the vote. For the 2008 elections it was part of the Patriotic Alliance for Change, which won two seats.
