= Central Unitaria de Trabajadores (Paraguay) =

Trade union centre in Paraguay

CUT
- Central Unitaria de Trabajadores
- Founded: 1989
- Headquarters: Asunción, Paraguay
- Location: Paraguay
- Key people: Alan Flores, president Jorge Alavarenga, secretary general
- Affiliations: ITUC
- Website: www.cut.org.py

The Central Unitaria de Trabajadores (CUT) is a national trade union center in Paraguay. It was founded in 1989 and is affiliated with the International Trade Union Confederation.
