= Fernando Lugo =

48th President of Paraguay (2008–2012)

Fernando Lugo (Note: Fernando Lugo cannot use the honorific prefix "His Excellency" for he was removed from office via impeachment, losing that honour as well as the "Senador Vitalicio" position.)
- Lugo in 2009

48th President of Paraguay
- In office 15 August 2008 – 22 June 2012
- Vice President: Federico Franco
- Preceded by: Nicanor Duarte
- Succeeded by: Federico Franco

President pro tempore of the Union of South American Nations
- In office 29 October 2011 – 22 June 2012
- Preceded by: Bharrat Jagdeo
- Succeeded by: Ollanta Humala

President of the Senate of Paraguay
- In office 30 June 2017 – 30 June 2018
- Preceded by: Robert Acevedo
- Succeeded by: Silvio Ovelar

Senator of Paraguay
- In office 30 June 2013 – 30 June 2023

Personal details
- Born: Fernando Armindo Lugo Méndez; 30 May 1951 (age 75) San Solano, Paraguay
- Party: Frente Guasú (since 2010)
- Other political affiliations: Christian Democratic Party (2007–2010); Patriotic Alliance for Change (2007–2010)
- Education: Catholic University of Our Lady of Asuncion; Pontifical Gregorian University
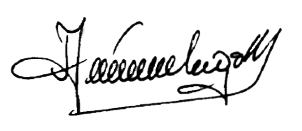
- Signature
- Bishop of San Pedro
- Church: Roman Catholic Church
- Diocese: Diocese of San Pedro
- In office: 5 March 1994 – 11 January 2005
- Predecessor: Oscar Páez Garcete
- Successor: Adalberto Martínez Flores

Orders
- Ordination: 15 August 1977
- Consecration: 17 April 1994 by Jose Sebastian Laboa
- Laicized: 30 June 2008

Fernando Armindo Lugo Méndez (Note: Spanish pronunciation: [feɾˈnando aɾˈmindo ˈluɣo ˈmendes]) (born 30 May 1951) is a Paraguayan politician and former Catholic bishop who was President of Paraguay from 2008 to 2012. Previously, he was a Roman Catholic priest and bishop, serving as Bishop of the Diocese of San Pedro from 1994 to 2005. He was elected as president in 2008, an election that ended 61 years of rule by the Colorado Party, and the Vatican permitted his reversion to lay status to serve as president.

In 2012, he was removed from office through a controversial impeachment process that neighboring countries deemed a coup d'état. He was elected to the Senate of Paraguay in the 2013 and 2018 general elections but failed to win reelection in the 2023 Paraguayan general election.

== Early life ==
Fernando Armindo Lugo Méndez was born on 30 May 1951 in San Solano. He received his basic education at a religious school in Encarnación, and sold snacks on the streets.

Lugo's family was not particularly religious; by his own account, he never saw his father set foot in a church.

== Priesthood ==
Lugo returned to Paraguay in 1982, and after a year, was sent to Rome for further academic studies. Lugo came back to Paraguay in 1987, two years before the Stroessner dictatorship's fall. Lugo was ordained a bishop on 17 April 1994, and received charge of the nation's poorest diocese, in the San Pedro diocese.

Lugo resigned as ordinary of the Diocese of San Pedro on 11 January 2005. He had requested laicization to run for office. However, the Holy See rejected the request on the grounds that bishops could not undergo laicization, and also denied him the requested canonical permission to run for civil elected office. However, after Lugo won the presidential election, the Church granted him lay status on 30 June 2008.

== Political career ==
Without doubt it is possible to resurrect a country like Paraguay. We are people of hope, of faith, and I won't be the one killing that hope of the people. I do believe we will resurrect this country, a country deeply drowned in misery, poverty and discrimination. Because I do believe Paraguay could be different. I do not lack faith in this flock. Where there is a scream coming from the poor people, where there is sweat, where people are shoeless, we will be there. Because in such people there is a resurrection; if that exists there, then there is resurrection for Paraguay.

— Fernando Lugo

Lugo jumped to the national arena by backing peasant claims for better land distribution. During 2006, opinion polls published by ABC Color newspaper showed him as a possible choice for the opposition's presidential candidacy. Known as "the bishop of the poor", Lugo was seen in subsequent months as the most serious threat to the dominance of the Colorado Party on Paraguayan politics. Although he said he found the presidency of Hugo Chávez in Venezuela interesting, he made a point to distance himself from leftist leaders in Latin America, focusing more on social inequality in Paraguay. On 23 February 2007, a Prensa Latina article noted that the Paraguayan Interior Ministry offered Lugo protection because of the death threats he received during the course of his political activities.

=== Presidential candidacy ===
According to a poll in February 2007, he was the leading contender in the April 2008 presidential election, with more than 37% of the voters' intention. On 29 October 2007, he registered as member of the small Christian Democratic Party of Paraguay (CDP), which allowed him to file as a candidate.

The CDP became the core of the Patriotic Alliance for Change, a coalition of more than a dozen opposition parties and social movements which backed Lugo for President. Federico Franco of the Authentic Radical Liberal Party, Paraguay's largest opposition party, was the candidate for vice president.

The legality of Lugo's candidacy was questioned, because Article 235 of the Constitution forbids clerics of any religious denomination to hold elective office, and Pope Benedict XVI had rejected Lugo's resignation from the priesthood. However, on 16 November 2007, President Nicanor Duarte Frutos (also Chairman of the Colorado Party) announced that the Party would not object to Lugo's candidacy, In July 2008, the Pope granted Lugo permission to be reverted to lay status, rendering the question moot.

=== President ===
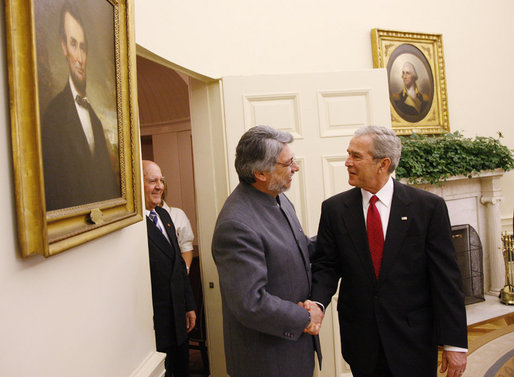
Lugo with U.S. president George W. Bush on 2008.

On 20 April 2008, Lugo won the election by a margin of 10%, gaining a 42.3% vote share. The Colorado Party candidate, Blanca Ovelar, acknowledged that Lugo had an unassailable lead and conceded the race that same night at about 9 pm local time. Two hours later, President Duarte acknowledged that the Colorados had lost an election for the first time in 61 years. Lugo's swearing in marked the first time in Paraguay's history (the country gained independence in 1811) that a ruling party peacefully surrendered power to an elected member from the opposition. He became Paraguay's second leftist president (the first being Rafael Franco, who served from 1936 to 1937), and the first to be freely elected.

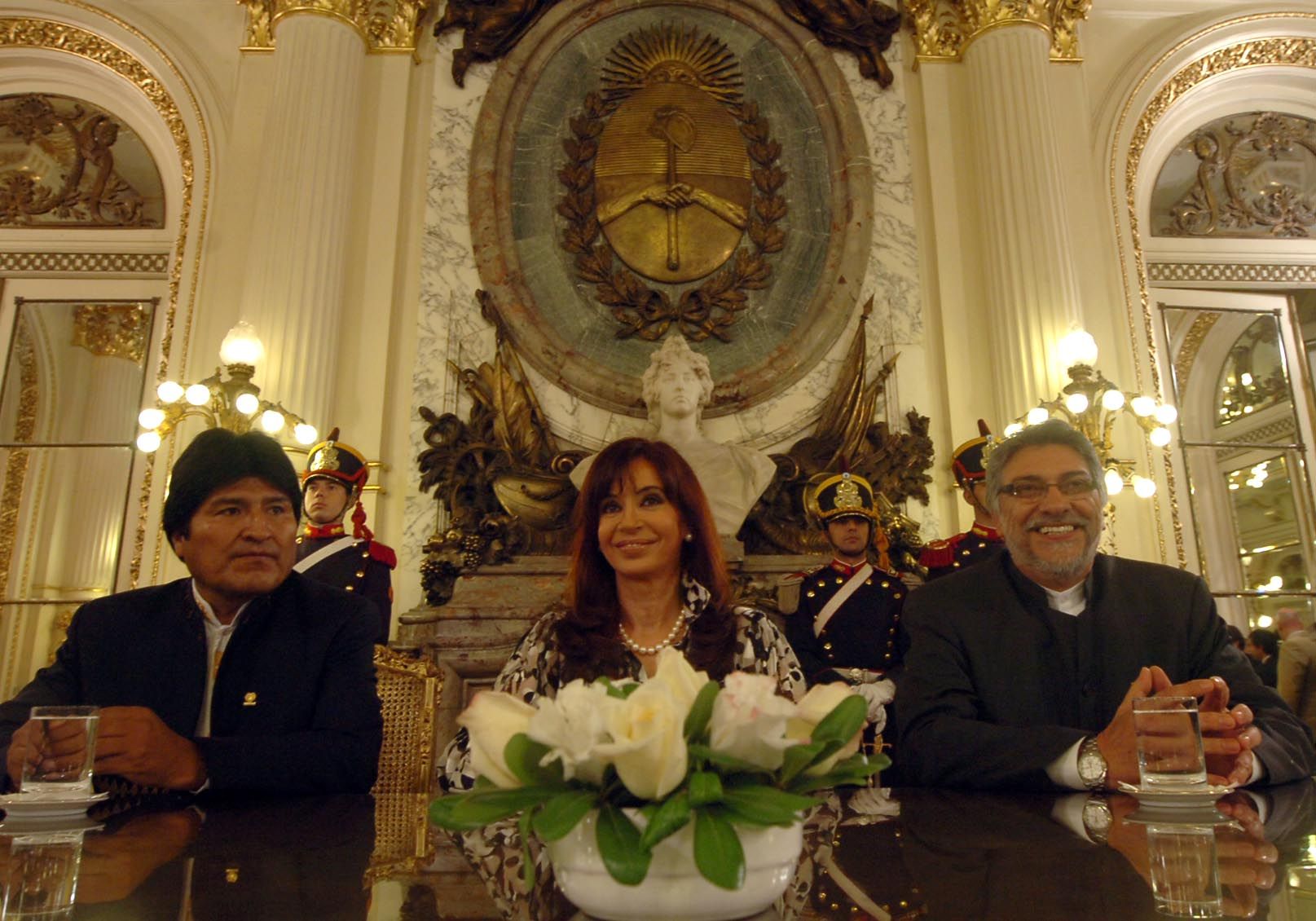
Lugo with Bolivia's Evo Morales and Argentina's Cristina Fernández on 2009.

Lugo was sworn in as president on 15 August 2008, saying he would not accept the presidential salary because it "belongs to more humble people" and encouraged other politicians to refuse their salaries as well.

He initially named Alejandro Hamed as his foreign minister. During the campaign, Lugo had suggested that he would switch diplomatic relations from the Republic of China (Taiwan) to the People's Republic of China, thereby depriving the ROC of its last diplomatic ally in South America. However, after the inauguration, which had been attended by President Ma Ying-jeou from Taiwan, Lugo stated that he had no plans to switch recognition.

On 18 August 2008, Lugo named Margarita Mbywangi, a member of the Aché indigenous ethnic group, as secretary of indigenous affairs, the first indigenous person to hold such a position in Paraguay.

Two of the main promises of Lugo's presidential campaign were tackling corruption and encouraging land reform. A number of initiatives were introduced to improve the lives of Paraguay's poor, such as spending on low-income housing, the introduction of free treatment in public hospitals, and the introduction of cash transfers for Paraguay's most impoverished citizens.

==== Health policy ====
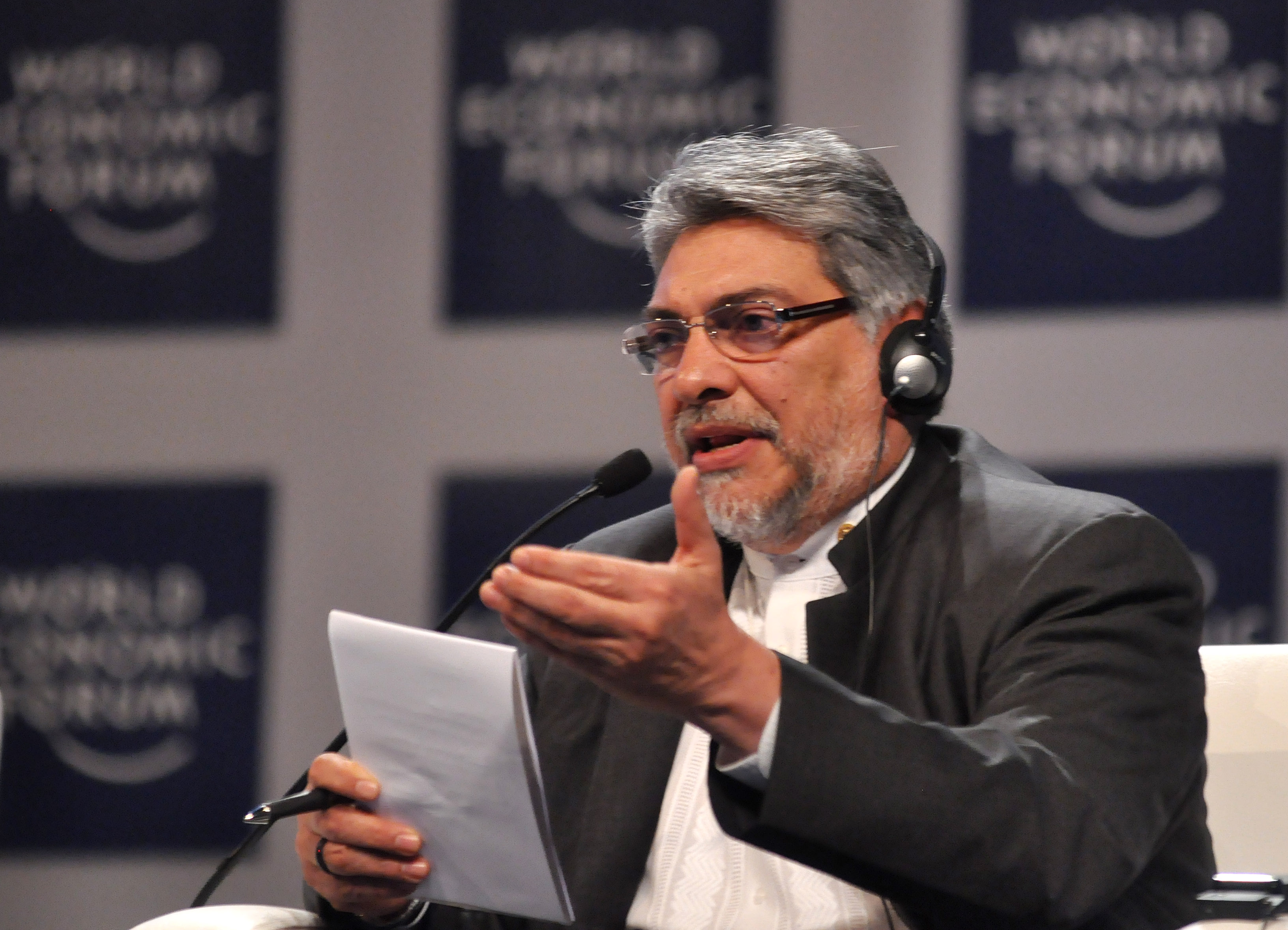
Fernando Lugo at the World Economic Forum in Cartagena in April 2010.

In social policy, the government gradually improved the health system in Paraguay, with the aim of universalizing it. Through a presidential resolution, health services were declared free of charge for the entire population, including outpatient consultations, medicines, and high-complexity interventions in public hospitals across the country and in private institutions.

==== Education policy ====
In the field of education, his administration expressed a commitment to public education, beginning the free distribution of laptops to primary school students under the One Laptop per Child program, a government initiative launched in 2008 aimed at promoting education in new technologies among public school students. His government program also included, for the first time, a school snack program administered by the respective departmental governments.

==== Economic policy ====
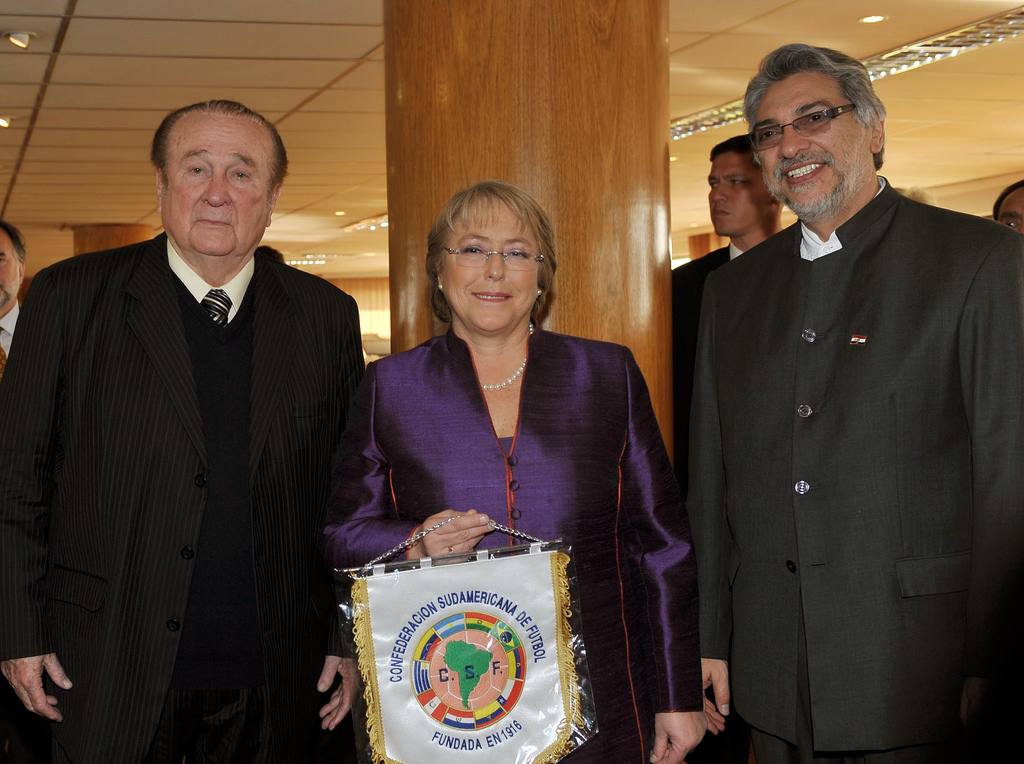
The president of CONMEBOL, Nicolás Leoz, and the president of Chile, Michelle Bachelet, together with Paraguayan president Fernando Lugo at the CONMEBOL Convention Center, where the 37th Mercosur Summit was held.

During 2010 and early 2011, Paraguay recorded record levels of economic growth, largely driven by exports of raw materials and the expansion of the commercial, industrial, and construction sectors, reaching historic growth peaks of 14.5 percentage points, one of the highest rates in Latin America.

Economic nationalism, the fight against corruption, and agrarian reform were his main priorities. However, in the spring of 2009 he lost the support of the Liberal Party and the majority in Parliament, and was unable to carry out the latter reform.

===== Itaipú compensation =====
On 6 April 2011 the Brazilian parliament ratified the treaty signed by Fernando Lugo and former Brazilian president Luiz Inácio Lula da Silva on 25 July 2009, which nearly tripled the amount paid by Brazil for the sale of Paraguay's surplus electricity from the Itaipu Dam. With this increase, Paraguay would raise its annual revenue until the contract's expiration in 2023. It was considered one of the major political achievements of his government. Lugo announced the creation of a Development Fund to invest these resources in public infrastructure.

==== Political instability ====
In December 2009, Lugo stated that he had been the target of several coup attempts and that he was threatened with a coup similar to that of July 2009 in Honduras. National media launched an offensive to remove him on various pretexts, accusing him, for example, of corruption. His own vice president, Federico Franco (PLRA), declared himself ready to assume power, while senator —also a liberal— Alfredo Jaeggli said he should be removed within four months, accusing him of failing to maintain order in the country.

Federico Franco attempted to remove Lugo in October 2010, accusing him of violating the Constitution of Paraguay. While Lugo was in Brazil undergoing treatment for lymphoma, Franco—acting as interim president—ordered changes to the general staff, a power he assumed in that capacity. The threat of an impeachment against Lugo was raised several times before 2012.

The opposition also targeted the defense minister, former general Luis Bareiro Spaini. He had requested explanations from the U.S. ambassador, Liliana Ayalde, in a letter that was considered undiplomatic: during a lunch organized by the American diplomat, attended by Vice President Federico Franco and several political figures—including Colorado Party member Hugo Estigarribia—as well as a group of U.S. generals, President Lugo was reportedly insulted. Accusing the minister of a “violation of diplomatic customs,” and without mentioning the ambassador's behavior, Parliament—where both the Colorado Party and the Authentic Radical Liberal Party held majorities—initiated impeachment proceedings against him. In a press statement, the Ministry of Defense denounced “the operational psycho-political setup of certain sectors of the opposition,” arguing that the attempt to impeach Bareiro Spaini was merely a prelude to “the real final strategic objective: the impeachment of the president of the Republic, Fernando Lugo Méndez,” and suggesting the involvement of “foreign interests contrary to those of Paraguay.”

===== Curuguaty events =====
In May 2012, the Campos Morombí estate in the town of Curuguaty, located about 240 km northeast of Asunción, and owned by former senator Blas Riquelme of the Colorado Party, was occupied by about one hundred peasants protesting the scarcity of agricultural land in the department of Canindeyú. After three weeks of occupation, on Friday 15 June the Ministry of the Interior ordered the forcible eviction of the property, resulting in violent clashes between occupants and police forces. During the eviction, 17 people were killed (eleven peasants and six police officers), an event that provoked strong criticism within the country and led to the resignation of Interior Minister Carlos Filizzola and police commander Paulino Rojas.

Police sources stated that officers were ambushed while attempting negotiations, and it was suspected that members of the Paraguayan People's Army had infiltrated the group of peasants. Other sources argue that the episode was staged to provide a pretext for Lugo's removal. Six months after the massacre, activist Vidal Vega, who had been conducting a parallel investigation, was assassinated by masked gunmen. According to Vega, “infiltrators” triggered the shooting, firing simultaneously at peasants and police. According to Hugo Richer, former minister of social action, “the episode may have been prepared to create the perfect motive to remove the president. Despite public pressure, the prosecutor has investigated only in one direction: according to him, the peasants ambushed the police.”

Fernando Lugo did not express support for the security forces but did extend condolences to the families of the deceased police officers. Lugo was subsequently impeached even though Parliament later acknowledged that the chain of command had been broken in the order issued regarding Curuguaty. On 16 June 2012, Lugo appointed a new interior minister, former attorney general Rubén Candia Amarilla, who replaced Carlos Filizzola. The president also replaced the commander of the National Police and announced the creation of a commission to investigate the events, with support from the Organization of American States, regarding what occurred in Curuguaty.

Multiple irregularities clouded the investigation. A police helicopter flew over the area during the events, but the video recorded from the air mysteriously disappeared. No forensic examinations or ballistic analyses were conducted to determine who might have killed the six police officers. A Mossberg Maverick 12-gauge rifle stolen from a former soldier days later—unrelated to the shooting—was added to the evidence used to support the alleged guilt of the landless peasants. On 20 March 2014, the Progressive Democratic Party (PDP) caucus presented photographs in the Senate showing dead peasants in handcuffs, suggesting possible summary executions.

==== Itaipú Binacional ====
In May 2011, representatives of the Itaipú Pension Fund (Cajubi) met with Lugo and the Director General of Itaipu, Gustavo Codas, to discuss Cajubi's problematic investments abroad.

In May 2012, during Lugo's presidency and with Diego Bertolucci as Itaipú's Legal Director, former prosecutor and Cajubi lawyer Rafael Fernández obtained an investment recovery contract with a fee of US$4 million, of which US$500,000 was paid upon signing.

In early June 2012, during Lugo's presidency, Itaipú's Legal Director, Diego Bertolucci, publicly dubbed Cajubi's investments abroad "The Heist of the Century." Bertolucci told the media that he had orders from Lugo to recover the embezzled funds.

On 14 June 2012, ABC Color reported that, during Lugo's presidency, Itaipu Binacional assumed responsibility for the total amount of the "theft of the century."

In August and September 2012, under the presidency of Lugo's successor, Federico Franco, the contract for attorney Rafael Fernandez's fees in Cajubi was rejected and renegotiated. The incoming Legal Director of Itaipú, Eusebio Ramon Ayala, described the contract as quasi-criminal and exploitative. Fernandez's fees were reduced from US$4 million to US$2 million.

=== Cabinet ===
- Minister of Foreign Relations: Alejandro Hamed Franco, Hector Lacognata and Jorge Lara Castro
- Minister of Finance: Dionisio Cornelio Borda
- Minister of Internal Affairs: Rafael Filizzola (PDP)
- Minister of National Defence: Luis Bareiro Spaini, Cecilio Pérez Bordón and Catalino Luis Roy
- Minister of Agriculture and Livestock: Cándido Vera Bejarano (PLRA) and Enzo Cardozo
- Minister of Industry and Commerce: Martín Heisecke (PLRA)
- Minister of Justice and Labor: Blas Llano (PLRA) and Humberto Blasco
- Minister of Public Works and Communications: Efraín Alegre (PLRA) and Cecilio Pérez Bordón
- Minister of Public Health and Social Welfare: Esperanza Martínez (Frente Guasú)
- Minister of Education and Culture: Horacio Galeano Perrone (ANR), Luis Riart (PLRA) and Víctor Ríos
- Minister of Women: Gloria Godoy de Rubin
- General Secretary of the Presidency: Miguel Ángel López Perito
- Secretary of Public Function: Lilian Soto (Kuña Pyrenda) and José Tomás Sánchez
- Secretary of Technical Planification: Carlos Sánchez y Bernardo Esquivel Vasken
- Secretary of the Environment: José Luis Casaccia (ANR)
- Secretary of Social Action: Paulino Cáceres (Tekojoja)
- Secretary of Culture: Ticio Escobar
- Secretary of National Emergency: Camilo Soares (P-MAS) and Gladys Mercedes Cardozo Zacarías
- Secretary of Childhood and Adolescence: Liz Torres
- Anti-drugs National Secretary: César Damián Aquino
- Director of the National Indigenous Institute: Margarita Mbywangi (Tekojoja)

=== Impeachment ===
On 15 June 2012, seventeen people were killed in a clash between landless farmers and the police who were trying to evict them; some sources consider that all this was taken as a pretext to expel Lugo. The Chamber of Deputies cited this event as well as insecurity, nepotism and a controversial land purchase to vote 76 to 1 to impeach Lugo on 21 June 2012. The Senate took up the case the next day. The impeachment was attended by a delegation of Foreign Affairs ministers from the other nations of the Union of South American Nations. The vote ended with 39 votes for Lugo's removal and four for his continuity, which ended his mandate and turned Federico Franco into the new president of Paraguay. Lugo announced that he would denounce the case to the Inter-American Court of Human Rights, stating that the time to prepare a legal defence, just two hours, may be unconstitutional. The removal of Lugo was followed by demonstrations by his supporters.

The presidents of Paraguay's neighbouring countries rejected Lugo's removal from office, and compared it to a coup d'état. Brazilian president Dilma Rousseff proposed suspending Paraguay's membership in Mercosur and the Union of South American Nations. Cristina Fernández de Kirchner of Argentina, Rafael Correa of Ecuador and Leonel Fernández of the Dominican Republic announced that they would not recognize Franco as president. Condemnation also came from more conservative governments in the region, such as Colombia and Chile. Lugo's removal has drawn comparisons to the ouster of Honduras' Manuel Zelaya in 2009; like the ouster of Lugo it was defended as legal and constitutional by its supporters while being denounced as a coup across the Latin American political spectrum.

Lugo himself accepted his ouster, saying that any legal and realistic chance of reinstating him ended when the Supreme Court of Paraguay declared his impeachment and confirmed his removal, and the electoral court recognized Franco as the new president. However, he denounced it as "a congressional coup."

He is considered in the polls as the best president in the contemporary history of Paraguay.

=== Senatorial candidacy ===
In the 2013 election to replace his interim presidential replacement Lugo ran as a senate candidate. He was elected as member of Paraguayan Senate representing left-wing coalition Frente Guasú.

== Honors ==
Lugo was awarded the Order of Brilliant Jade by Ma Ying-jeou, the President of the Republic of China in March 2011.

== Personal life ==
As Lugo was unmarried during his presidency, he designated his elder sister, Mercedes Lugo, as First Lady of Paraguay.

In August 2010, Lugo was diagnosed with non-Hodgkin lymphoma. He continued his duties as president of Paraguay while undergoing treatment.

He also studied at Pontifical Gregorian University in Rome.

=== Children ===
Lugo fathered several children out of wedlock, including one that was allegedly the result of sexual assault. These allegations from four mothers, who claimed that Lugo had fathered their children while under a vow of celibacy, emerged soon after his 2008 inauguration. One of the children was conceived with a 24-year-old woman who says they began a sexual relationship when she was sixteen (Paraguay's age of consent is 14) and while he was a bishop.

== Notes ==
Catholic Church titles
Preceded by Oscar Páez Garcete	Bishop of San Pedro; 1994–2005	Succeeded by Adalberto Martínez Flores
Political offices
Preceded by Nicanor Duarte	President of Paraguay; 2008–2012	Succeeded by Federico Franco
Diplomatic posts
Preceded by Bharrat Jagdeo	President pro tempore of the Union of South American Nations; 2011–2012	Succeeded by Ollanta Humala
