= Domingo Laíno =

Paraguayan politician, economist, and activist

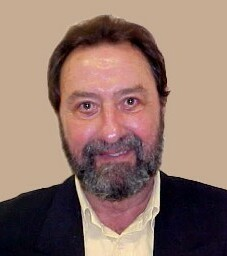
- Official portrait, 2003

Senator of Paraguay
- In office 30 June 2003 – 30 June 2008
- In office 30 June 1989 – 30 June 1993

National Deputy of Paraguay from Asunción
- In office 30 June 1968 – 25 March 1977

Personal details
- Born: Domingo Isabelino Laíno Figueredo; July 8, 1935 (age 91) Asunción, Paraguay
- Party: Authentic Radical Liberal Party
- Spouse: Rafaela Guanes
- Children: 4
- Education: Universidad Nacional de Asunción
- Occupation: Politician; economist; activist

Domingo Isabelino Laíno Figueredo (born 8 July 1935) is a Paraguayan politician, economist, and activist. The first leader of the Authentic Radical Liberal Party, a Senator, and a former Member of the Chamber of Deputies, Laino first became known for his opposition to the Stroessner dictatorship: in 1956, he was arrested for having publicly opposed the arrest of university students. In the years that followed, he was arrested so many times that he "lost count".

In September 1979, Laíno was confined to the town of Mbuyapey, 182 km from Asuncion. In December 1982, he was arrested, allegedly for painting anti-government slogans on walls; he was subsequently deported to Argentina. He attempted to return in March 1983, in March 1985, twice in December 1985, and in June 1986; each time, he was blocked.

In April 1987, Laíno was finally allowed to return to Paraguay; however, he continued his opposition to the Stroessner regime, leading to his being arrested again in September 1987 and February 1988.

In February 1989, Stroessner was overthrown by Andrés Rodríguez, who implemented widespread reforms; these reforms included a presidential election in May 1989. Laíno ran for President, but lost to Rodríguez. Laíno ran for president in the two subsequent elections as well, but came second each time (losing to Juan Carlos Wasmosy in 1993, and to Raúl Cubas Grau in 1998).

== Awards ==
In 1991, Liberal International named Laíno co-winner of that year's Prize For Freedom.
