= 2008 Paraguayan general election =

- 20 April 2008
- Presidential election
- Turnout: 65.48% (▲1.28pp)
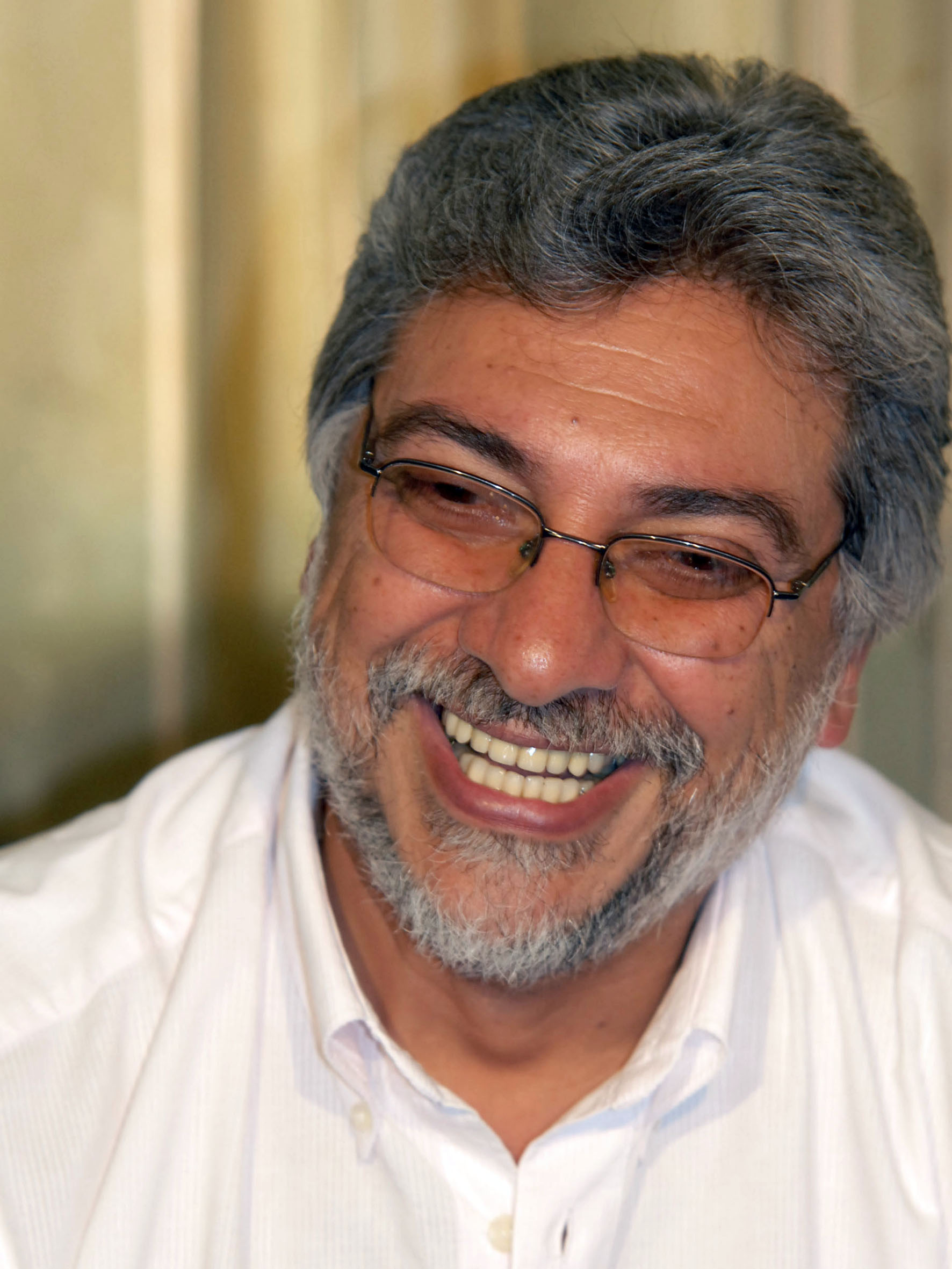

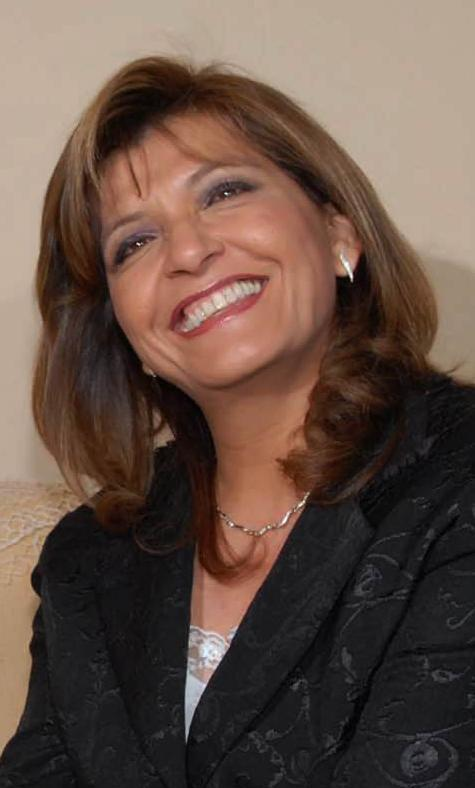

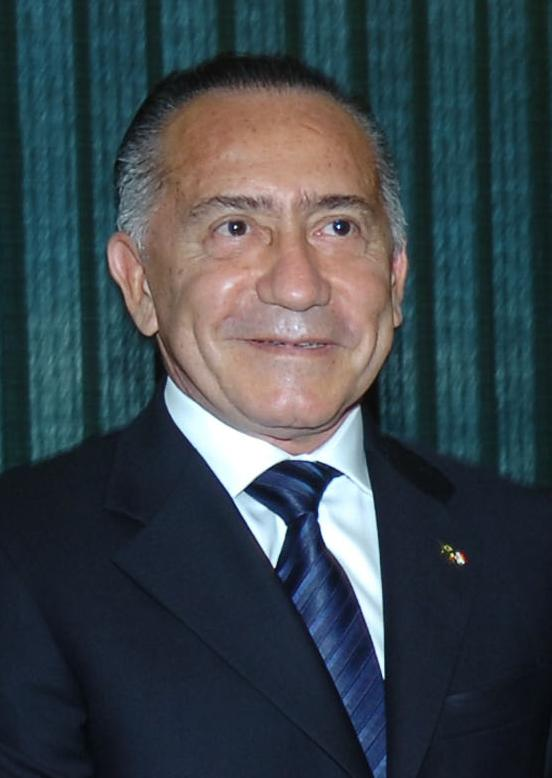
Candidate	Fernando Lugo	Blanca Ovelar	Lino Oviedo
Party	PDC	Colorado	UNACE
Alliance	APC
Running mate	Federico Franco	Carlos María Santacruz	Nicolás Godofredo Lüthold
Popular vote	764,968	540,513	386,597
Percentage	42.40%	31.75%	22.74%
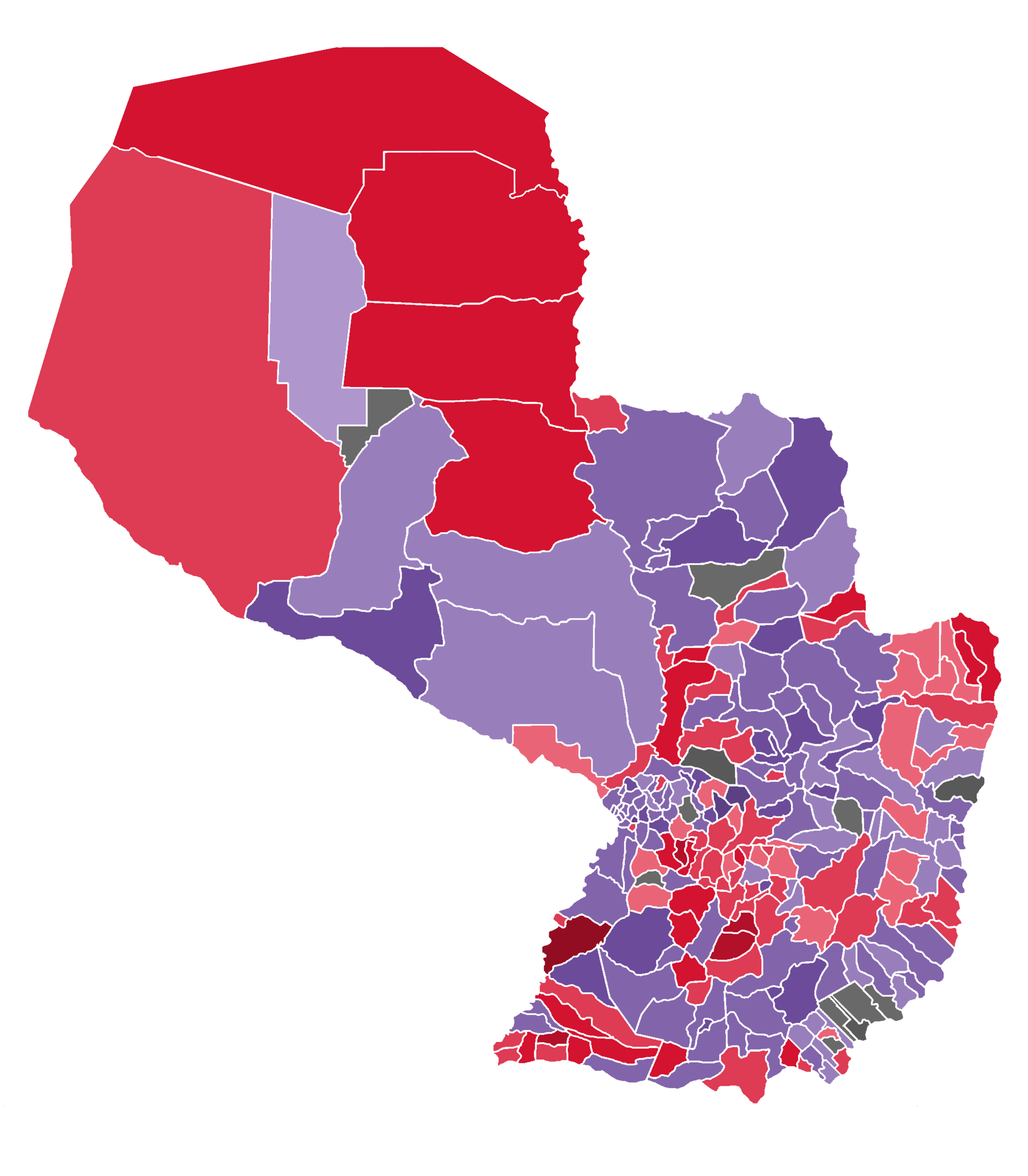
President before election
Nicanor Duarte Frutos
Colorado
Elected President
Fernando Lugo
Patriotic Alliance for Change
- Chamber of Deputies
- All 80 seats in the Chamber of Deputies; 41 seats needed for a majority
Party	Leader	Vote %	Seats	+/–
Colorado	Jose Alberto Alderete	32.96	30	−7
PLRA	Blas Llano	28.27	27	+6
UNACE	Enrique Gonzales Quintana	18.70	15	+5
PPQ	Pedro Fadul	5.77	7	−3
PPT		3.65	1	New
PDP		1.70	1	New
APC		1.32	2	New
BDA		0.37	1	New
This lists parties that won seats. See the complete results below.
- Senate
- All 45 seats in the Senate; 23 seats needed for a majority
Party	Vote %	Seats	+/–
Colorado	29.07	15	−1
PLRA	28.92	14	+2
UNACE	19.20	9	+2
PPQ	8.66	4	−3
PPS	3.47	1	+1
PPT	2.98	1	New
PDP	2.19	1	New
This lists parties that won seats. See the complete results below.

General elections were held in Paraguay on 20 April 2008. Elections were held for the presidency, 45 senators, 80 representatives, 17 governors and Paraguay's members in the Mercosur Parliament.

The presidential election was won by opposition candidate Fernando Lugo of the Patriotic Alliance for Change, who defeated Blanca Ovelar of the long-ruling Colorado Party. The Colorado Party remained the largest in both houses of Congress despite losing several seats.

The election ended a 61-year hold on the presidency by the Colorados. The Colorados had held the presidency without interruption since 1947 (from 1947 to 1962 as the de jure sole legal party, and from 1962 to 1989 as the de facto sole legal party). Additionally, when Lugo took office on 15 August, it marked the first time since Paraguay gained independence in 1813 that an incumbent government peacefully transferred power to an elected member of the opposition.

== Presidential candidates and campaigning ==
The following candidates ran for president:

- Fernando Lugo, Patriotic Alliance for Change (APC)
- Lino Oviedo, National Union of Ethical Citizens (UNACE)
- Blanca Ovelar, Colorado Party (ANR-PC)
- Pedro Fadul, Beloved Fatherland Party (PPQ)

The incumbent president, Nicanor Duarte Frutos, was barred by the Constitution from running for reelection and instead supported his education secretary, Blanca Ovelar. Initial results in the Colorado Party's December 2007 primary showed Ovelar defeating former Vice President Luis Castiglioni, but the result was disputed, leading to a recount. On 21 January 2008, the Colorado Party electoral commission announced that Ovelar had won with 45.04% of the vote against 44.5% for Castiglioni, although Castiglioni continued to claim victory, alleging that 30,000 votes in his favor were "stolen", and said that he would take the matter to court. Ovelar said that her campaign would shift its focus from the "cruel primary campaign" to the general election and that her platform prioritized "fight against poverty and to the creation of jobs".

Lugo is a former bishop who resigned from the priesthood in December 2006 in preparation for his presidential bid. As a priest, he required a permit from the Vatican to become directly involved in politics prior to 2006. However, the Paraguayan constitution prohibits ministers of any faith from standing as a political candidate. Despite his resignation, the Vatican regards priesthood as a lifelong commitment but has suspended him from his duties.

As bishop of San Pedro, a poor region, for ten years beginning in 1994, his support for landless peasants earned him a reputation as "the bishop of the poor". He is an advocate of land reform and other measures to address poverty, but has distanced himself from leftists such as Hugo Chávez and Evo Morales, saying that he is not left-wing or right-wing but "in the middle". He vowed to end the Colorado Party's 61 year rule, fight corruption, and make Paraguay "a new country". According to Lugo, he believes "in the people's self-determination and in recovering sovereignty and independence". Lugo is backed by the Patriotic Alliance for Change (APC), which includes both left and right wing groups, notably the conservative Authentic Radical Liberal Party. President Duarte caused controversy just before the election by telling the Ultima Hora newspaper that Lugo "probably sells himself" for money from Venezuela, Bolivia, and Ecuador.

Ovelar, the Colorado candidate, said that she knew "what the people need and what has to be done". She said that she would focus on job creation and the strengthening of agricultural cooperatives, hoping to reduce the number of Paraguayans who emigrate for economic reasons. According to Ovelar, Paraguay has "new needs that were not obvious before ... and they require the touch of a woman". If elected, Ovelar would have been Paraguay's first female president.

Lino Oviedo's conviction for 1996 mutiny was overturned by the Supreme Court in October 2007, leaving him free to run for president. In January 2008 he was nominated as the candidate of his party, the National Union of Ethical Citizens, without opposition.

Ovelar held her last campaign rally in Asunción on 16 April. Along with Oviedo and Fadul, she participated in a last televised debate in the early afternoon of 17 April; Lugo did not participate, and Ovelar criticized him for this. Lugo held his last rally in Asunción later that night, with about 15,000 supporters present.

== Opinion polls ==
A poll from September 2007 saw a three-way race develop between Lugo, Oviedo and the ANR-PC candidate.

A poll from November 2007 saw Lugo lead with over 40%, with Oviedo in second place and Castiglioni or Ovelar (it was still undetermined which of the pair would run) in third place.

A poll from March 2008 saw two way developing with Lugo in the lead with 31%, Ovelar in second place with 27% and Oviedo in third place with 24%. A poll from 5 April 2008 saw Lugo and Ovelar in a statistical dead heat with Lugo in the lead with 30.9%, Ovelar in second with 30.1%, and Oviedo in third with 21.4%. More than 10% remained undecided.

== Results ==
Shortly after the election, with results from 13,000 of 14,000 polling stations counted, Lugo had 41% of the vote against 31% for Ovelar and 22% for Oviedo. Lugo's supporters celebrated in the streets of Asunción, and he declared that "today we've written a new chapter in our nation's political history". Ovelar conceded defeat, acknowledging that Lugo's lead was unassailable. A couple of hours later, President Nicanor Duarte Frutos appeared at a press conference somberly but remarked that for the first time in the history of Paraguay a handover to the opposition will take place peacefully and in an orderly fashion.

In the gubernatorial election, the ANR won nine departments, the PLRA seven and the APC one.

In August, shortly before taking office, Lugo struck a deal with Oviedo, enabling him to govern with a parliamentary majority. Together, the Authentic Liberal Radical Party and National Union for Ethical Citizens will hold 25 out of 45 Senate seats and 44 out of 80 House of Representatives seats.

Lugo was sworn in as president on 15 August 2008.

=== President ===
Candidate	Party	Votes	%
Fernando Lugo	Patriotic Alliance for Change	766,502	42.40
Blanca Ovelar	Colorado Party	573,995	31.75
Lino Oviedo	National Union of Ethical Citizens	411,034	22.74
Pedro Fadul	Beloved Fatherland Party	44,060	2.44
Sergio Martínez Estigarribia	Paraguayan Humanist Party	6,744	0.37
Horacio Enrique Eduardo Galeano Perrone	Tetã Pyahu Movement	3,080	0.17
Julio César López Benítez	Workers' Party	2,409	0.13
Total		1,807,824	100.00
Valid votes		1,807,824	96.46
Invalid/blank votes		66,303	3.54
Total votes		1,874,127	100.00
Registered voters/turnout		2,861,940	65.48
Source: Justicia Electoral

=== Chamber of Deputies ===
Results by department

Party	Votes	%	Seats	+/–
Colorado Party	582,932	32.96	30	−7
Authentic Radical Liberal Party	500,040	28.27	27	+6
National Union of Ethical Citizens	330,754	18.70	15	+5
Beloved Fatherland Party	102,139	5.77	3	−7
Tekojoja People's Movement	64,566	3.65	1	New
Progressive Democratic Party	29,980	1.70	1	New
Movement for Socialism	29,223	1.65	0	New
Patriotic Alliance for Change	23,363	1.32	2	–
National Encounter Party	14,227	0.80	0	0
Hope for Social Renewal	9,251	0.52	0	New
Tricolour Democratic Alliance	8,280	0.47	0	New
People's Unity Party	8,119	0.46	0	New
Party for a Country of Solidarity	7,887	0.45	0	−2
Paraguayan Humanist Party	7,455	0.42	0	0
Tetã Pyahu Movement	7,511	0.42	0	New
Caazapeña Patriotic Alliance	7,451	0.42	0	New
Boquerón Departmental Alliance	6,629	0.37	1	New
National Revolutionary Alliance	4,568	0.26	0	New
National Citizens' Resistance Movement	4,562	0.26	0	New
Oñondivepa Political Movement	4,206	0.24	0	New
Broad Front Party	3,918	0.22	0	0
Northern Patriotic Alliance	3,538	0.20	0	New
Workers' Party	2,128	0.12	0	New
MONAPEJUAM	1,547	0.09	0	New
Departmental Consensus for Change	1,296	0.07	0	New
National Christian Union	1,077	0.06	0	New
AC–PFA–BSP	946	0.05	0	New
Revolutionary Febrerista Party	520	0.03	0	0
Guaireña Alliance for Change	516	0.03	0	New
Republican Force Movement	93	0.01	0	New
Total	1,768,722	100.00	80	0
Valid votes	1,768,722	94.45		
Invalid/blank votes	103,941	5.55		
Total votes	1,872,663	100.00		
Registered voters/turnout	2,861,940	65.43		
Source: TSJE

=== Senate ===
Party	Votes	%	Seats	+/–
Colorado Party	509,907	29.07	15	−1
Authentic Radical Liberal Party	507,413	28.92	14	+2
National Union of Ethical Citizens	336,763	19.20	9	+2
Beloved Fatherland Party	151,991	8.66	4	−3
Party for a Country of Solidarity	60,947	3.47	1	+1
Tekojoja People's Movement	52,247	2.98	1	New
Progressive Democratic Party	38,402	2.19	1	New
National Encounter Party	20,843	1.19	0	−1
Movement for Socialism	10,564	0.60	0	New
National Citizens' Resistance Movement	9,864	0.56	0	New
Tetã Pyahu Movement	8,030	0.46	0	New
People's Unity Party	7,510	0.43	0	New
Tricolour Democratic Alliance	7,260	0.41	0	New
Hope for Social Renewal	5,066	0.29	0	New
Paraguayan Humanist Party	4,893	0.28	0	0
Pensioners to Power	4,789	0.27	0	New
Broad Front Party	4,322	0.25	0	0
MONAPEJUAM	3,657	0.21	0	New
Oñondivepa Political Movement	3,116	0.18	0	New
National Revolutionary Alliance	2,853	0.16	0	New
National Christian Union	1,915	0.11	0	New
Workers' Party	1,951	0.11	0	New
Total	1,754,303	100.00	45	0
Valid votes	1,754,303	93.68		
Invalid/blank votes	118,257	6.32		
Total votes	1,872,560	100.00		
Registered voters/turnout	2,861,940	65.43		
Source: TSJE
