= President pro tempore of Mercosur =

Highest representative of Mercosur

- Presidente pro tempore do Mercosul (Portuguese); Presidente pro tempore de Mercosur (Spanish)
- Flag of Mercosur in Spanish and Portuguese

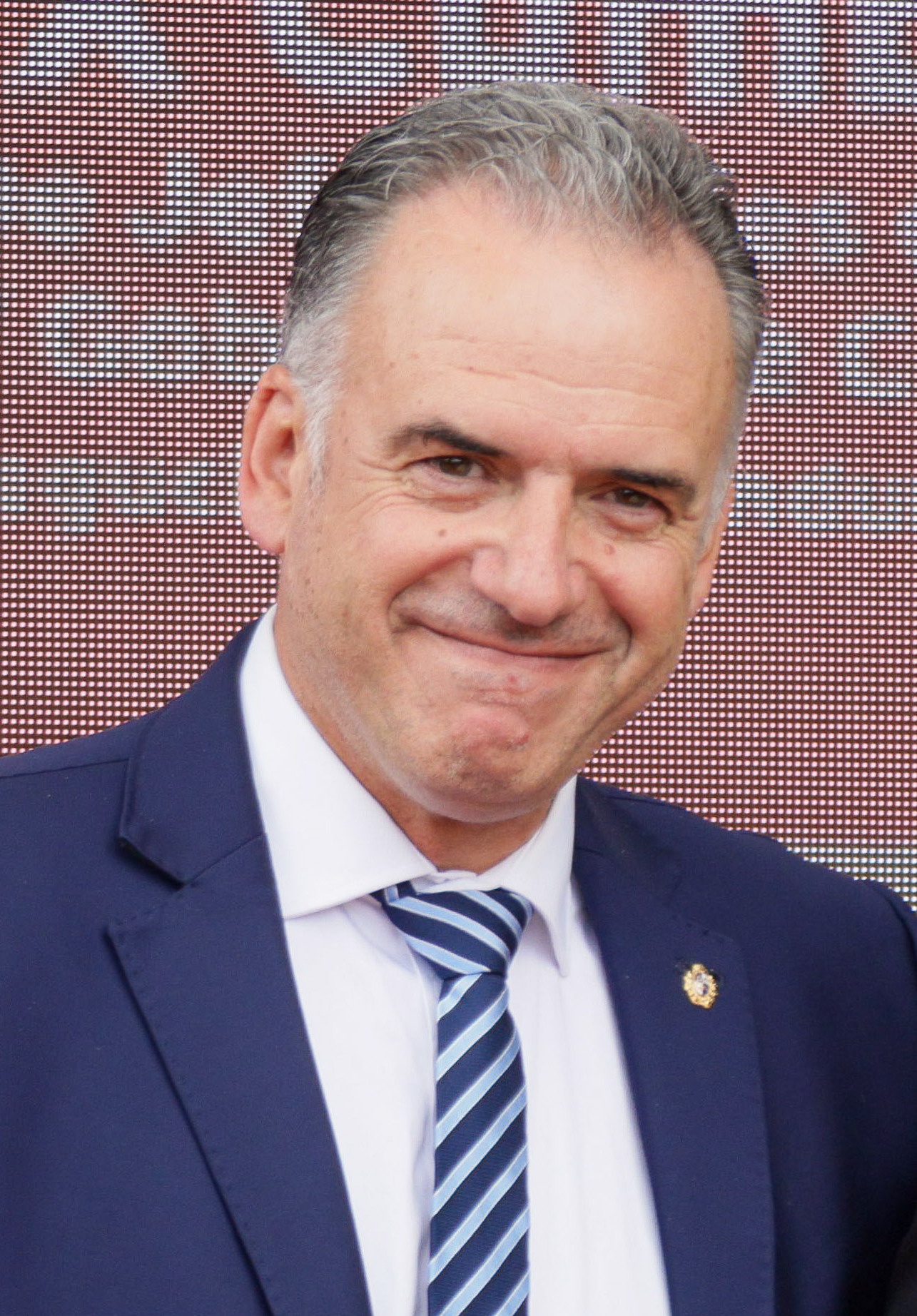
- Incumbent (Uruguay) Yamandú Orsi since 2 July 2026
- Style: Mr. President (informal); The Most Excellent (formal); His Excellency (alternative formal, diplomatic)
- Term length: Approximately 6 months
- Constituting instrument: Treaty of Asunción
- Inaugural holder: Carlos Menem
- Website: www.mercosur.int

The President pro tempore of Mercosur (PPT) is the highest legal-political representative pro tempore of the Southern Common Market (Mercosul). The office is held for a six-month period by a head of State of one of the State members. It is alternated, in alphabetical order, among the presidents of Argentina, Brazil, Paraguay, Uruguay and Venezuela (suspended from the organization).

The ceremonial mallet given to the holders of President pro tempore of Mercosur is a handicraft gavel, which is given to every new holder.

== State members ==
- President of Argentina
- President of Bolivia
- President of Brazil
- President of Paraguay
- President of Uruguay
- President of Venezuela (suspended)

== List ==
No.	Portrait	President	Took office	Left office	Time in office	Country
1	Carlos Menem	Carlos Menem (1930–2021)	29 November 1991	1 July 1992	215 days	Argentina
2	Fernando Collor	Fernando Collor (born 1949)	1 July 1992	1 January 1993	184 days	Brazil
3	Andrés Rodríguez	Andrés Rodríguez (1923–1997)	1 January 1993	1 July 1993	181 days	Paraguay
4	Luis Alberto Lacalle	Luis Alberto Lacalle (born 1941)	1 July 1993	1 January 1994	184 days	Uruguay
5	Carlos Menem	Carlos Menem (1930–2021)	1 January 1994	1 July 1994	181 days	Argentina
6	Itamar Franco	Itamar Franco (1929–2011)	1 July 1994	1 January 1995	184 days	Brazil
7	Juan Carlos Wasmosy	Juan Carlos Wasmosy (born 1938)	1 January 1995	1 July 1995	181 days	Paraguay
8	Julio María Sanguinetti	Julio María Sanguinetti (born 1936)	1 July 1995	1 January 1996	184 days	Uruguay
9	Carlos Menem	Carlos Menem (1930–2021)	1 January 1996	1 July 1996	182 days	Argentina
10	Fernando Henrique Cardoso	Fernando Henrique Cardoso (born 1931)	1 July 1996	1 January 1997	184 days	Brazil
11	Juan Carlos Wasmosy	Juan Carlos Wasmosy (born 1938)	1 January 1997	1 July 1997	181 days	Paraguay
12	Julio María Sanguinetti	Julio María Sanguinetti (born 1936)	1 July 1997	1 January 1998	184 days	Uruguay
13	Carlos Menem	Carlos Menem (1930–2021)	1 January 1998	1 July 1998	181 days	Argentina
14	Fernando Henrique Cardoso	Fernando Henrique Cardoso (born 1931)	1 July 1998	1 January 1999	184 days	Brazil
15	Raúl Cubas Grau	Raúl Cubas Grau (born 1943)	1 January 1999	28 March 1999	86 days	Paraguay
16	Luis González Macchi	Luis González Macchi (born 1947)	28 March 1999	1 July 1999	95 days	Paraguay
17	Julio María Sanguinetti	Julio María Sanguinetti (born 1936)	1 July 1999	1 January 2000	184 days	Uruguay
18	Fernando de la Rúa	Fernando de la Rúa (1937–2019)	1 January 2000	1 July 2000	182 days	Argentina
19	Fernando Henrique Cardoso	Fernando Henrique Cardoso (born 1931)	1 July 2000	1 January 2001	184 days	Brazil
20	Luis González Macchi	Luis González Macchi (born 1947)	1 January 2001	1 July 2001	181 days	Paraguay
21	Jorge Batlle	Jorge Batlle (1927–2016)	1 July 2001	1 January 2002	184 days	Uruguay
22	Eduardo Duhalde	Eduardo Duhalde (born 1941)	1 January 2002	1 July 2002	181 days	Argentina
23	Fernando Henrique Cardoso	Fernando Henrique Cardoso (born 1931)	1 July 2002	1 January 2003	184 days	Brazil
24	Luis González Macchi	Luis González Macchi (born 1947)	1 January 2003	1 July 2003	181 days	Paraguay
25	Jorge Batlle	Jorge Batlle (1927–2016)	1 July 2003	1 January 2004	184 days	Uruguay
26	Néstor Kirchner	Néstor Kirchner (1950–2010)	1 January 2004	1 July 2004	182 days	Argentina
27	Luiz Inácio Lula da Silva	Luiz Inácio Lula da Silva (born 1945)	1 July 2004	1 January 2005	174 days	Brazil
28	Nicanor Duarte	Nicanor Duarte (born 1956)	1 January 2005	20 June 2005	170 days	Paraguay
29	Tabaré Vázquez	Tabaré Vázquez (1940–2020)	20 June 2005	9 December 2005	172 days	Uruguay
30	Néstor Kirchner	Néstor Kirchner (1950–2010)	9 December 2005	21 July 2006	224 days	Argentina
31	Luiz Inácio Lula da Silva	Luiz Inácio Lula da Silva (born 1945)	21 July 2006	19 January 2007	182 days	Brazil
32	Nicanor Duarte	Nicanor Duarte (born 1956)	19 January 2007	29 June 2007	161 days	Paraguay
33	Tabaré Vázquez	Tabaré Vázquez (1940–2020)	29 June 2007	18 December 2007	172 days	Uruguay
34	Cristina Kirchner	Cristina Kirchner (born 1953)	18 December 2007	1 July 2008	196 days	Argentina
35	Luiz Inácio Lula da Silva	Luiz Inácio Lula da Silva (born 1945)	1 July 2008	16 December 2008	168 days	Brazil
36	Fernando Lugo	Fernando Lugo (born 1951)	16 December 2008	24 July 2009	220 days	Paraguay
37	Tabaré Vázquez	Tabaré Vázquez (1940–2020)	24 July 2009	8 December 2009	137 days	Uruguay
38	Cristina Kirchner	Cristina Kirchner (born 1953)	8 December 2009	3 August 2010	238 days	Argentina
39	Luiz Inácio Lula da Silva	Luiz Inácio Lula da Silva (born 1945)	3 August 2010	17 December 2010	136 days	Brazil
40	Fernando Lugo	Fernando Lugo (born 1951)	17 December 2010	29 June 2011	194 days	Paraguay
41	José Mujica	José Mujica (1935–2025)	29 June 2011	20 December 2011	174 days	Uruguay
42	Cristina Kirchner	Cristina Kirchner (born 1953)	20 December 2011	29 June 2012	192 days	Argentina
43	Dilma Rousseff	Dilma Rousseff (born 1947)	29 June 2012	7 December 2012	161 days	Brazil
44	José Mujica	José Mujica (1935–2025)	7 December 2012	12 July 2013	217 days	Uruguay
45	Nicolás Maduro	Nicolás Maduro (born 1962)	12 July 2013	29 July 2014	1 year, 17 days	Venezuela
46	Cristina Kirchner	Cristina Kirchner (born 1953)	29 July 2014	17 December 2014	141 days	Argentina
47	Dilma Rousseff	Dilma Rousseff (born 1947)	17 December 2014	17 July 2015	212 days	Brazil
48	Horacio Cartes	Horacio Cartes (born 1956)	17 July 2015	21 December 2015	157 days	Paraguay
49	Tabaré Vázquez	Tabaré Vázquez (1940–2020)	21 December 2015	29 July 2016	221 days	Uruguay
–	Joint presidency	Joint presidency (Note: Venezuelan Foreign Minister Delcy Rodríguez, appointed by Nicolás Maduro as representative for the presidency, was blocked from assuming office by the others State members. Venezuela was later suspended from the organization on 1 December 2016.); Acting	13 September 2016	14 December 2016	92 days	Argentina; Brazil; Paraguay; Uruguay
50	Mauricio Macri	Mauricio Macri (born 1959)	14 December 2016	21 July 2017	219 days	Argentina
51	Michel Temer	Michel Temer (born 1940)	21 July 2017	21 December 2017	153 days	Brazil
52	Horacio Cartes	Horacio Cartes (born 1956)	21 December 2017	18 June 2018	179 days	Paraguay
53	Tabaré Vázquez	Tabaré Vázquez (1940–2020)	18 June 2018	18 December 2018	183 days	Uruguay
54	Mauricio Macri	Mauricio Macri (born 1959)	18 December 2018	17 July 2019	211 days	Argentina
55	Jair Bolsonaro	Jair Bolsonaro (born 1955)	17 July 2019	5 December 2019	141 days	Brazil
56	Mario Abdo Benítez	Mario Abdo Benítez (born 1971)	5 December 2019	2 July 2020	210 days	Paraguay
57	Luis Lacalle Pou	Luis Lacalle Pou (born 1973)	2 July 2020	16 December 2020	167 days	Uruguay
58	Alberto Fernández	Alberto Fernández (born 1959)	16 December 2020	8 July 2021	204 days	Argentina
59	Jair Bolsonaro	Jair Bolsonaro (born 1955)	8 July 2021	17 December 2021	162 days	Brazil
60	Mario Abdo Benítez	Mario Abdo Benítez (born 1971)	17 December 2021	21 July 2022	216 days	Paraguay
61	Luis Lacalle Pou	Luis Lacalle Pou (born 1973)	21 July 2022	6 December 2022	138 days	Uruguay
62	Alberto Fernández	Alberto Fernández (born 1959)	6 December 2022	4 July 2023	210 days	Argentina
63	Luiz Inácio Lula da Silva	Luiz Inácio Lula da Silva (born 1945)	4 July 2023	7 December 2023	156 days	Brazil
64	Santiago Peña	Santiago Peña (born 1978)	7 December 2023	8 July 2024	214 days	Paraguay
65	Luis Lacalle Pou	Luis Lacalle Pou (born 1973)	8 July 2024	6 December 2024	151 days	Uruguay
66	Javier Milei	Javier Milei (born 1970)	6 December 2024	3 July 2025	209 days	Argentina
67	Luiz Inácio Lula da Silva	Luiz Inácio Lula da Silva (born 1945)	3 July 2025	20 December 2025	170 days	Brazil
68	Santiago Peña	Santiago Peña (born 1978)	20 December 2025	2 July 2026	194 days	Paraguay
69	Yamandú Orsi	Yamandú Orsi (born 1967)	2 July 2026	Incumbent	93 days	Uruguay
