= 2000 Paraguayan coup attempt =

2000 political crisis in Paraguay

2000 Paraguayan coup d'état attempt
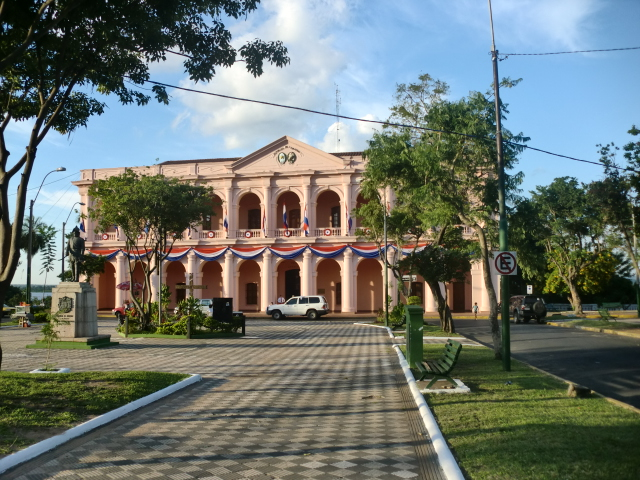
- The then-building of the Congress of Paraguay (now Cultural Center of the Republic) was attacked by insurgent troops
Date	18 – 19 May 2000
Location	Paraguay (mainly Asunción)
Result	Coup failed: Paraguay placed under a state of exception; President Luis Ángel González Macchi retains the presidency; Executive Branch weakened; Several military and congress people arrested

Belligerents
Government of Paraguay; Paraguayan Army members loyal to the president ANR (government supporters)	Fulgencio Yegros Patriotic Movement; Paraguayan Army members loyal to Lino Oviedo; ANR (Oviedo supporters or oviedistas); UNACE movement

Commanders and leaders
Luis Ángel González Macchi	Lino Oviedo (allegedly)

The 2000 Paraguayan coup d'état attempt was a political crisis that occurred in Paraguay in May 2000, with the aim of deposing then President of Paraguay Luis Ángel González Macchi and arresting some "anti-oviedista" members of Congress. The attempted coup was led by a group that called itself "Fulgencio Yegros Patriotic Movement", formed by at least fifty soldiers, most of them retired and loyal to former General Lino Oviedo, who at the time was in political exile.

== Events ==
On 18 May 2000, around 10:00 pm, troops loyal to former General Lino Oviedo rebelled against the government of President of Paraguay Luis Ángel González Macchi. The group called itself "Fulgencio Yegros Patriotic Movement", in honor of Paraguayan independence hero Fulgencio Yegros, and proposed rebellion as the only alternative to change a government that, according to them, was "illegitimate". This insurgent group was made up of at least fifty retired soldiers, accompanied by lower-ranking officers.

Insurgents took over the Cavalry Regiment, the police headquarters, an elite police unit, the Special Police Operations Force (FOPE, Fuerza de Operaciones Policiales Especiales), the Canal 13 television channel, radio stations Radio Cardinal and Radio 970, among others. Five tanks went to the center of Asunción and fired at the Congress building (now Cultural Center of the Republic). Although loyal forces exchanged fire with the rebels, there were no casualties. Apparently, the original plan was not fulfilled and failed. In Caazapá and Villarrica there were also reports that rebels occupied certain places.

At 1:30 am on 19 May, the Executive Branch declared a 30-day state of exception across the country in response to the attempted coup d'état. At the time, Oviedo (in hiding since December 1999) denied that these acts were related to him. This coup attempt (the second in less than five years) is considered to be a consequence of Marzo paraguayo, a period of great political instability.

At least thirty high-ranking military officers were detained in the presidential guard, including several retired army generals and colonels. At least four deputies and several politicians belonging to the UNACE movement (at the time not yet a political party), which Lino Oviedo led in hiding, were also detained.

Several countries, such as Brazil and the United States, and the Permanent Council of the Organization of American States (OAS), "vehemently" condemned the coup attempt and expressed their support for the González Macchi government.

== See also ==
- 1989 Paraguayan coup d'état
- 1996 Paraguayan coup d'état attempt
- Marzo paraguayo
