= Nicanor Duarte =

President of Paraguay from 2003 to 2008

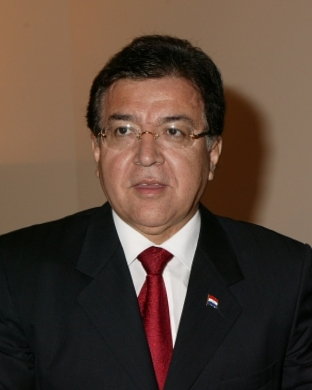
- Duarte in 2006

47th President of Paraguay
- In office 15 August 2003 – 15 August 2008
- Vice President: Luis Castiglioni (2003–2007); Francisco Oviedo (2007–2008)
- Preceded by: Luis González Macchi
- Succeeded by: Fernando Lugo

Paraguayan Director of the Yacyretá Dam
- In office 15 August 2018 – 15 August 2023
- President: Mario Abdo Benítez
- Preceded by: Ángel María Recalde
- Succeeded by: Luis Benítez Cuevas

Paraguayan Ambassador to Argentina
- In office 25 October 2013 – 4 January 2016
- President: Horacio Cartes
- Preceded by: Gabriel Enciso López
- Succeeded by: Federico González

President of the Colorado Party
- In office 15 May 2001 – 14 August 2003
- Preceded by: Bader Rachid Lichi
- Succeeded by: José Alberto Alderete

Minister of Education and Culture
- In office 30 March 1999 – 29 January 2001
- President: Luis González Macchi
- Preceded by: Celsa Bareiro de Soto
- Succeeded by: Darío Zárate Arellano
- In office 15 August 1993 – 13 February 1997
- President: Juan Carlos Wasmosy
- Preceded by: Horacio Galeano Perrone
- Succeeded by: Vicente Sarubbi

Personal details
- Born: Óscar Nicanor Duarte Frutos; 11 October 1956 (age 69) Coronel Oviedo, Paraguay
- Party: Colorado Party
- Spouse: Gloria Penayo (m. 1984)
- Children: 6
- Education: Universidad Católica de Asunción; Universidad Nacional de Asunción
- Occupation: Lawyer; journalist; politician
- Nickname: El tendota

Óscar Nicanor Duarte Frutos (born 11 October 1956) is a Paraguayan lawyer, journalist and politician who served as the 47th President of Paraguay from 2003 to 2008. A member of the Colorado Party, he became the central figure of Paraguayan politics during his presidency.

Born into a lower class rural family, Duarte pursued a career in law and later journalism, becoming a radio sports commentator and columnist. In the 1990s he got into politics, serving in the cabinets of Presidents Juan Carlos Wasmosy and Luis González Macchi, both times as Minister of Education. Duarte became one of the top allies of the Colorado Party politician Luis María Argaña, inheriting his political clout after his assassination in March 1999. Duarte was elected president in 2003, by a plurality of 37%, taking advantage of a three-way split in the opposition to the incumbent Colorado Party. Inaugurated at 46, Duarte was one of Paraguay's youngest presidents, as well as its first non-Catholic, being a Protestant convert.

Duarte's administration was marked by a rejection of the path his country and party had taken in the past decade, turning away from neoliberalism to instead embrace the pink tide and 21st century socialism. Overall, the Paraguayan economy grew during his tenure, mostly as part of a recovery from the crisis of the 1990s. His support of and from Venezuelan President Hugo Chávez, as well as his proposal to amend the constitution to allow the reelection of the president, made large parts of the Paraguayan public see him as increasingly authoritarian, leading in part to the defeat of his protégé, Blanca Ovelar, in the 2008 election.

In said 2008 election Duarte was elected senator, but the Senate refused to swear him in, arguing that it would be unconstitutional, this happened again in 2018.

The financial investments that Itaipú's pension fund (Cajubi) made in Canada, known as "the robbery of the century", occurred between 2005 and 2008, during his presidential tenure and when his appointee, Victor Bernal Garay, was the director of Itaipú.

Nicanor promoted Blanca Ovelar's candidacy for the Colorado Party in the 2007 primary elections and the 2008 presidential election, positioning her as his successor.

According to major media outlets and other sources in Paraguay, Blanca Ovelar's campaigns were illicitly financed with money from Itaipu Binacional and its subsidiaries Cajubi and Tesai, with the involvement of Nicanor and his appointee, the Director General of Itaipu, Victor Bernal.

After leaving office Duarte served as Ambassador to Argentina from 2013 to 2016, under the presidency of Horacio Cartes. He was later appointed director of the Yacyretá Dam. Like all former presidents, Duarte currently holds the ceremonial and powerless title of Senator for life.

In January 2025, Judge Celia Salinas issued a final ruling awarding civil damages against the former directors of the Itaipu pension fund, Cajubi. Cajubi's lawyer, Rafael Fernández, told the media that Duarte was not investigated, supposedly "due to the complicit silence of the convicted former directors."

== Early life and career ==
=== Family ===
Óscar Nicanor Duarte Frutos was born on 11 October 1956 in Coronel Oviedo, Caaguazú, to a rural lower-class mestizo family. His father, Héctor Roque Duarte, was a police officer and songwriter who fought on the colorado side of the Paraguayan Civil War of 1947, under general Patricio Colmán. His mother, Disnarda Antonia Frutos, was a teacher. Nicanor started working at sawmills when he was eleven, while attending school. At fourteen he joined the Colorado Party, something that was de facto mandatory at the time, due to the dictatorship.

=== Education and early career ===
In the 1970s Duarte moved to Asunción, where he studied law and journalism. He became a sports commentator, working at a Caaguazú radio station. In the early 1980s he was hired by the editor-in-chief of Última Hora, where he started working as a columnist. At this point in his life Duarte was fairly poor, he lived in a small apartment and had few material possessions. In 1984 he obtained a law degree from the Catholic University of Asuncion and in 1989 a doctorate from the National University of Asuncion.

=== Wife and children ===
In the 1970s he started dating María Gloria Penayo Solaeche, who he married in 1984. They had six children: José, Héctor, María, Martín, Santiago and Facundo. Penayo is a member of a Mennonite church, Duarte decided to convert alongside her.

=== Political career ===
After the fall of Alfredo Stroessner in 1989, Duarte got more involved in politics and started climbing up the ladder of the Colorado Party throughout the 1990s. He became Vice Minister of Education during the Rodríguez administration and was later appointed Minister of Education by President Juan Carlos Wasmosy in 1993.

Duarte became an opponent of army general and colorado caudillo Lino Oviedo, who led a failed coup against Wasmosy in 1996. His opposition to Oviedo drifted Duarte increasingly closer to the general's main rival, Luis María Argaña, who led his own faction within the party, the Colorado Reconciliation Movement. In 1997 Duarte left the Ministry of Education to instead be Argaña's running mate in the Colorado Party primaries, held to elect the party's nominee for president in the 1998 election. In an effort to unite the party, Argaña became the running mate of the oviedista Raúl Cubas, who won the election.

In March 1999 Vice President Argaña was assassinated. This sparked rage and fear of another coup by Oviedo, which led to large protests that eventually made Cubas resign. The argañista Luis González Macchi was sworn in as president and quickly appointed Duarte back to the Ministry of Education. Duarte inherited Argaña's political faction and clout, effectively becoming his successor. In 2001 he resigned as Education Minister to become president of the Colorado Party.

== 2003 presidential election ==
=== Colorado Party primary elections ===
On 22 December 2002, Duarte won the Colorado Party's nomination for president in the 2003 general election. He defeated Osvaldo Domínguez Dibb, a wealthy businessman known for being president of the Club Olimpia football team. Domínguez Dibb was the leader of the neoestronista movement, having been a big supporter of the dictator and related to him through marriage.

=== General election ===
On 27 April 2003, Duarte won the presidential election with a plurality, 37,1% of the vote. He beat Julio César "Yoyito" Franco of the Authentic Radical Liberal Party (24%), Pedro Fadul of the recently created Beloved Fatherland Party (21,3%) and Guillermo Sánchez of the oviedista National Union of Ethical Citizens (13,5%). This three-way split in the opposition to the Colorado Party played in his favor.

== Presidency (2003–2008) ==
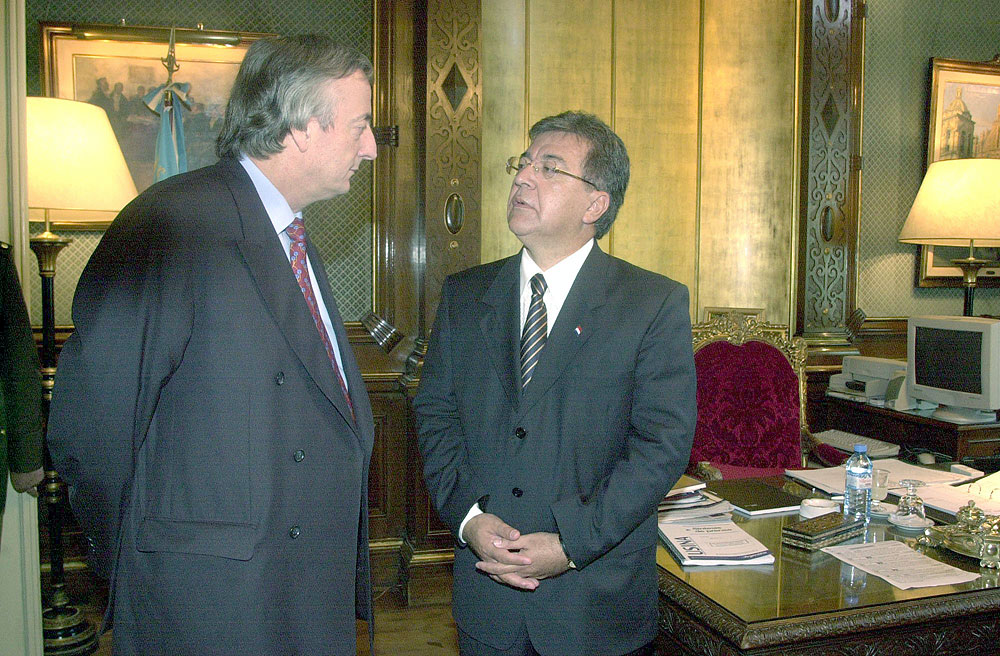
Duarte with Argentine President Néstor Kirchner in 2004

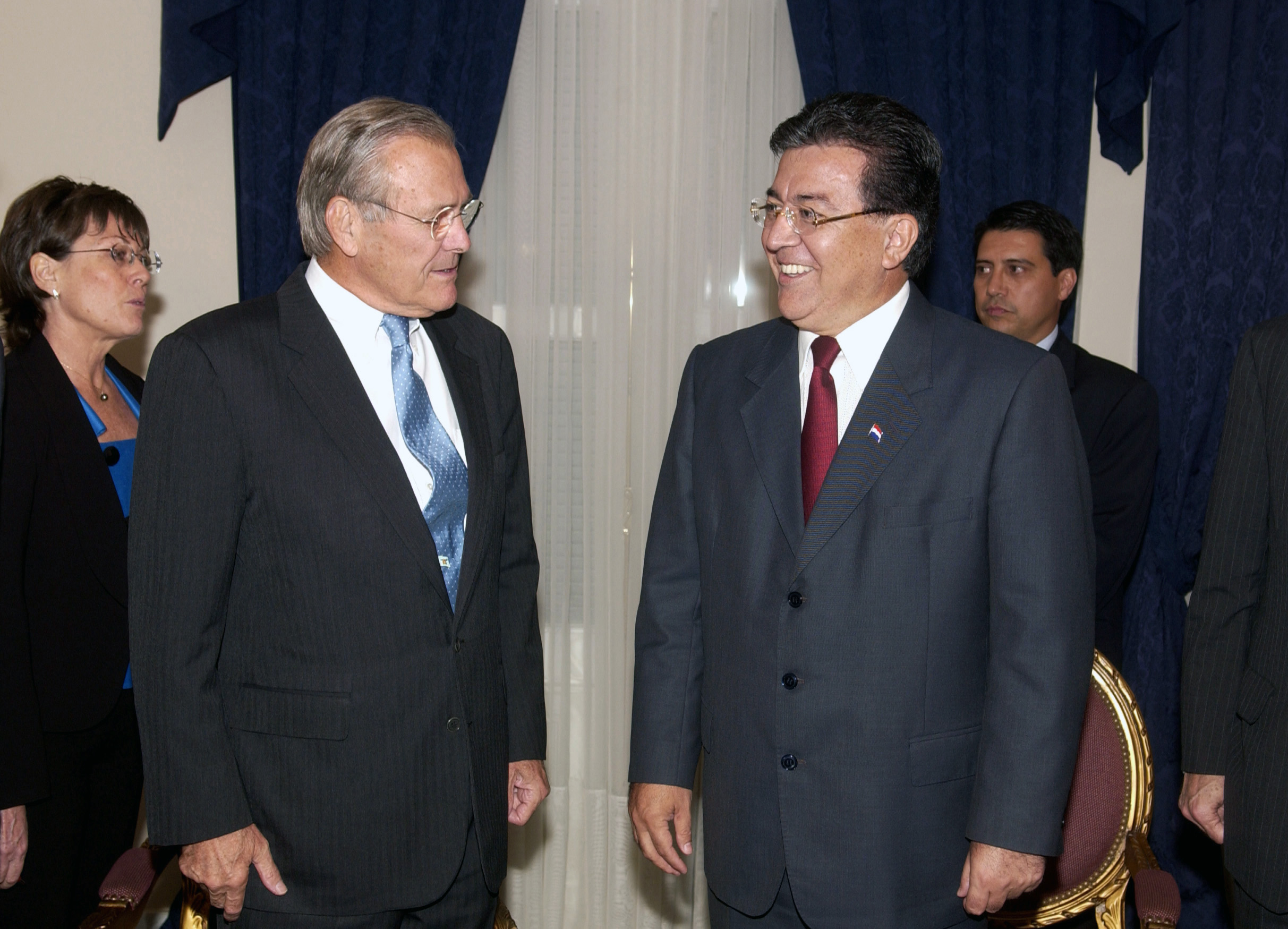
Duarte with US Secretary of Defense Donald Rumsfeld in 2005

Nicanor Duarte pursued policies which were somewhat more left-wing than has been the case for the Colorado Party over its 60-year rule of Paraguay. At least in speeches, he had opposed free trade and reached out to regional Latin American countries with left-leaning governments.

== Later life ==
In two separate instances, Duarte Frutos ran for, was elected, and attempted to be sworn in as an active, voting Senator, despite Paraguayan law stating that upon leaving office, presidents can only be senador vitalicio (senator for life), a ceremonial, non-voting post.

Duarte first announced his resignation as president, in order to assume a position as Senator on 1 July 2008. He presented his resignation on 23 June 2008 to then President of the Congress of Paraguay, senator Miguel Abdón Saguier.

Opposition and government-endorsed members of the Paraguayan Congress immediately announced they were going to boycott Duarte Frutos's resignation by not attending the extraordinary session of the Congress where it would be determined whether the President's resignation would be accepted or not. While some held positions in favour of Duarte Frutos assuming as senator, citing a sentence from the Superior Electoral Justice Tribunal, other congresspeople argued that Duarte Frutos's swearing-in senator would be illegal, and Congress would be violating the Constitution if swearing-in Duarte Frutos without the legal quorum. If Congress did not accept the resignation, Duarte would have to continue his term until 15 August and would be unable to become an elected senator, becoming instead a non-voting senator for life as a former president. As expected, the quorum was not reached at the extraordinary session called for this reason for 24 June 2008. Since Duarte Frutos could not occupy the seat belonging to him on 1 July, Jorge Cespedes, from the Colorado Party, was assigned and assumed as titular of the vacant seat of Duarte at the Senate.

On 26 August, another extraordinary session of Congress was called to swear-in Duarte Frutos, but once again many congresspeople left the session, which was declared "empty" or abandoned by Congress President Enrique Gonzalez Quintana. Nonetheless, Gonzalez Quintana proceeded to the swearing-in and swore Duarte Frutos, who arrived at the Legislative Palace followed by fellow Colorado Party supporters. However, on 4 September, the Paraguayan Senate, in session to discuss resolutions on the crisis concerning Duarte Frutos's swearing-in as senator, finally approved a bill, revalidating a previous bill that had not been approved the previous session of 28 August. On the session of the 28 August, Jorge Cespedes was confirmed as titular senator, instead of Duarte Frutos, who was in turn confirmed as senador vitalicio, or senator for life, handing its seat upon Cespedes.

In 2018, Duarte Frutos and then-outgoing Paraguayan President Horacio Cartes were elected as senators to represent the Colorado Party in the 2018 Paraguayan General elections, raising criticism from the opposition that their senate candidacies were unconstitutional, but the Superior Tribunal of Electoral Justice overruled that decision, claiming that both Cartes and Duarte Frutos were eligible to run for the Senate. Ultimately, neither were able to assume as Senators this time either.

== Honours ==
- Chile
  - Collar of the Order of the Merit of Chile - August 2005
- Portugal:
  - Grand Collar of the Order of Prince Henry - September 2005
- SMOM:
  - Collar pro Merito Melitensi - October 2004
- Spain:
  - Collar of the Order of Isabella the Catholic - October 2006
- Taiwan:
  - Grand Cordon of the Order of Brilliant Jade - May 2004

Political offices
| Preceded by Jorge Cespedes | Senator of Paraguay; August 26, 2008 – August 28, 2008 | Succeeded by Jorge Cespedes |
| Preceded by Luis Ángel González Macchi | President of Paraguay; 2003–2008 | Succeeded by Fernando Lugo |
