= José Félix Fernández Estigarribia =

Paraguayan politician and diplomat

José Fernández Estigarribia

Minister of Foreign Affairs of Paraguay
- In office June 23, 2012 – August 15, 2013
- President: Federico Franco
- Preceded by: Jorge Lara Castro
- Succeeded by: Eladio Loizaga
- In office September 6, 1999 – February 15, 2000
- President: Luis Ángel González Macchi
- Preceded by: Miguel Abdón Saguier
- Succeeded by: Juan Esteban Aguirre Martínez

Personal details
- Born: 4 February 1941 Asunción, Paraguay
- Party: Authentic Radical Liberal Party
- Education: Universidad Nacional de Asunción
- Profession: Lawyer; Diplomat; Politician

José Félix Fernández Estigarribia (born 4 February 1941) is a Paraguayan politician and diplomat. He studied law at the National University of Asunción.

He served twice as Foreign Minister of Paraguay, first under Luis González Macchi (1999-2000) and then under Federico Franco (2012-2013).

A member of the Authentic Radical Liberal Party, he has been Representative and Senator.

He was also Secretary General of ALADI.
