= Marzo paraguayo =

Political crisis in Paraguay

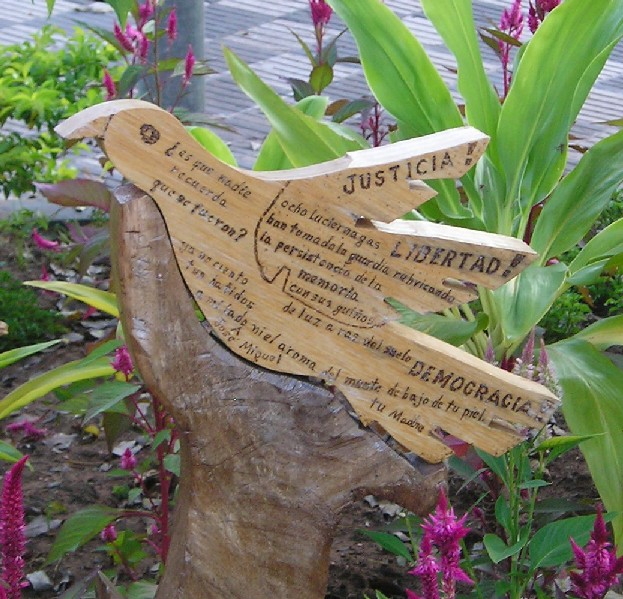
- Sculpture in memory of the murdered protesters in Plaza Independencia.
- Date: 23 March 1999 – 28 March 1999
- Location: Asunción, Paraguay
- Caused by: Assassination of Luis María Argaña
- Goals: Resignation of President Raúl Cubas Grau; Imprisonment of Lino Oviedo
- Result: President Cubas Grau resigns; Oviedo flees the country

Casualties
- Deaths: 7

The Marzo paraguayo ("Paraguayan March") was a political crisis that occurred in Paraguay because of the assassination of the then-Vice President Luis María Argaña on 23 March 1999. The opposition blamed the then-President, Raúl Cubas Grau, and also the strongman of Paraguayan politics of that time, Lino Oviedo, for the assassination. Argaña's assassination provoked a series of demonstrations by opponents and supporters of Oviedo and the Cubas government, which culminated in clashes in which seven demonstrators opposed to the government died, which resulted in the resignation of Cubas from the presidency.

== Background ==
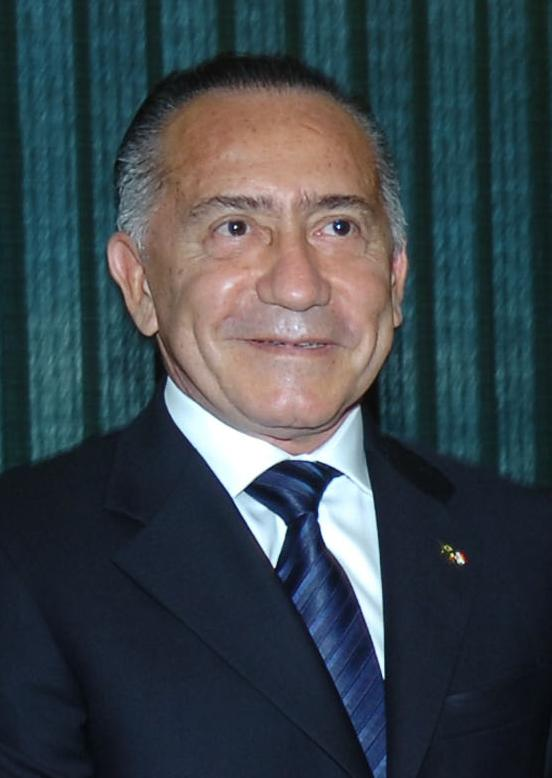
Former Army General Lino Oviedo was involved in several events that led to the crisis, including being accused of acting as one of the intellectual authors of the assassination of Luis María Argaña

The background for the Marzo paraguayo can be traced back to the feud between two important Paraguayan caudillos at the time: Luis María Argaña and Lino Oviedo.

Argaña had a long career in Paraguayan politics. He was a judge during Paraguay's long-lasting military dictatorship under Alfredo Stroessner, and served in a number of important national positions during previous administrations. He ran an ultimately unsuccessful bid for the Colorado Party nomination for President in the 1993 election. Senator and Colorado politician Juan Carlos Galaverna would state in 2008 that there was an electoral fraud (of which Galaverna took part) in the primaries to hand the victory to Argaña's opponent Juan Carlos Wasmosy, who would go on to win the Presidency.

Argaña ran another bid for the Colorado ticket in the 1997 primaries, where he faced another strong contender: Lino Oviedo, a general who participated in the 1989 coup d'état that overthrew Stroessner from power, and later staged a failed coup attempt of his own in 1996. Argaña and Oviedo faced off in what was described by Paraguayan newspaper Última Hora as "the most energetic and exalted electoral campaign" of the Colorado Party. Argaña had the support of President Wasmosy, but still could not defeat Oviedo. However, soon after his victory, Oviedo was disqualified as a candidate after being found guilty and sentenced to jail for the unsuccessful 1996 coup attempt. Oviedo's running mate, Raúl Cubas Grau, assumed the presidential nomination, and the Colorado Party formed an emergency ticket enlisting Argaña as Cubas' running mate. With a campaign slogan "Cubas al poder, Oviedo en libertad" ("Cubas to power, Oviedo in freedom"), they won the 1998 election with the highest percentage of votes since the end of Stroessner's tenure (and the only outright majority win) with 55% of votes over Domingo Laíno.

Cubas Grau fulfilled his campaign promise; three days after his inauguration, he released Oviedo from jail. Despite an order from the Supreme Court of Paraguay in December 1998, Cubas refused to send Oviedo back to jail. In response, the Chamber of Deputies voted to charge Cubas with abuse of power in February 1999, and began proceedings to start an impeachment process.

== Events ==
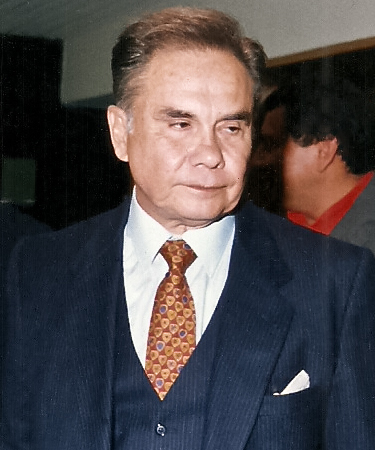
The crisis began with the assassination of Luis María Argaña

On the morning of 23 March 1999, Vice President Argaña was traveling from his residence, when minutes before 9:00 a.m. three men aboard a car intercepted his vehicle. The men descended from their vehicle and opened fire on Argaña's car. Argaña was transferred to a local hospital, where he was officially announced dead. At the time, Argaña was accompanied by his driver, Víctor Barrios Rey, and his assigned bodyguard, police sub-officer Francisco Barrios González; Barrios González was killed in the attack, while Barrios Rey was injured but survived.

The event moved the country. Supporters of Argaña along with opponents of the Cubas Grau government blamed Oviedo and Cubas Grau for the assassination, and demanded the resignation of Cubas Grau and the imprisonment of Oviedo. Soon, a multisectoral organization had been formed with the participation of organizations such as Jóvenes por la Democracia, Paraguay Jaipotava ("The Paraguay That We Want"), Youth Parliament, and the Colorado movement that supported Argaña, Reconciliación Colorada ("Colorado Reconciliation"). Also present were the Social Ministry of the Paraguayan Catholic Church, students of the Faculty of Philosophy of the National University of Asunción and some Paraguayan unions.

A march to the Palacio de los López the same day of the assassination was contained by police, and in the afternoon was victim of a strong police repression, with protesters taking refuge in the squares of the Congress. The Minister of the Interior, Rubén Arias, resigned and was replaced by retired Captain Carlos Cubas, brother of President Cubas.

On 24 March, in an extraordinary session, the Chamber of Deputies overwhelmingly voted to impeach President Cubas. President Cubas announced that he ordered the arrest of Oviedo to comply with his sentence for the 1996 attempted coup d'état, which was seen as a last-ditch effort to stay in office; Cubas said that Oviedo volunteered. Oviedo went to the barracks of the Presidential Escort Battalion, but clarified that he did not consider himself a detainee, but rather voluntarily presented himself to clarify his legal situation.

In the square in front of the Congress, opponents and supporters to Oviedo began to group. Both sides were separated by the police, establishing a neutral space between the groups. There were constant confrontations between the opposition demonstrators and the government supporters. The situation remained for the next two days as the protesters followed the impeachment proceedings.

On 26 March, a clash broke out between opposition demonstrators and supporters of the government and police forces. A strong combined repressive action by the police forces succeeded in evicting the opposition demonstrators from the square, forcing them to retreat to the vicinity of the Metropolitan Cathedral. The Oviedistas occupied the entire sector for a few minutes, as the opposition entered the square again, attacking with stones and sticks, and succeeded in driving the supporters of the government and the police out of the place. Several cars were overturned or burned to form barricades and fortify the square.

President Cubas ordered that the Armed Forces go out to impose control. A dozen tanks and troops of the Cavalry moved towards the center of Asunción, but the barricades prevented the entry to the squares. Tanks took positions in nearby areas. In the evening there was an attack by snipers located in buildings near the squares of the Congress or from nearby streets, killing seven demonstrators.

With his political support having disappeared and facing near-certain conviction and removal by the Senate, Cubas Grau announced his resignation on the night of 28 March. He was succeeded by Luis Ángel González Macchi, who as President of the Senate was next in the line of succession.

== Conspiracy theories ==
Oviedo claimed that in the Metropolitan Cathedral of Asunción, weapons were placed at the disposition of demonstrators that were opponents to Oviedo. He stated "In the deposit of the Metropolitan Cathedral not only supplies were distributed, but also weapons and ammunition". Oviedo did not present evidence of his claims, and his statements caused widespread rejection of both the Paraguayan Catholic Church, the Association of Catholic Communicators (an organization of journalists) as well as various social and political leaders of Paraguay.

Julio César Martínez, who claims to be an illegitimate son of Argaña, claimed that Argaña supposedly actually died the day before the assassination at the house of his mistress, and that his half-brothers conceived the assassination to take over the government.

ABC Color journalist and ally of Oviedo, Hugo Ruiz Olazar, published a series of articles and interviews that were oriented to expose what he claimed were the "hidden truth" of the Marzo paraguayo. This series of articles contained claims such as that Argaña died the day before the assassination, and that the demonstrators shot in the square were shot from the roof of the Senate building. According to Olazar, all these statements led him to the conclusion that the Marzo paraguayo was a conspiracy designed to discredit Oviedo and Cubas Grau and overthrow the latter's government. ABC Color has been described as a media outlet close to Oviedo, and the articles and conclusions of Olazar have not been put to trial nor have the interviewees cited by Olazar offered their statements before the authorities.

Claims that Argaña was already dead at the time the assassination took place were refuted by Argaña's sons, with his son Félix stating that he remembered that his father "woke up in good spirits" that morning, and that he made several calls from his cellphone.

== Aftermath ==
On the same day that Cubas Grau resigned, Oviedo escaped to Argentina, where he obtained political asylum. However, faced with pressures from different Argentine political sectors and the overt political activity of Oviedo, his asylum was withdrawn and Oviedo disappeared. Oviedo would resurface in Brazil, where he was arrested in June 2000. Oviedo would obtain asylum; from there, he began an intense political activity that led him to be accused of being the intellectual author of the protests against the Paraguayan government carried out mostly by his supporters, which led the government to decreed a state of emergency. The Brazilian government forbade him from engaging in any political activity, however, he defied the prohibition.

In 2004, Oviedo returned to Paraguay to face his charges both for the 1996 coup attempt and the killing of protesters during the Marzo paraguayo, and was immediately transferred to the Viñas Cue military prison. He was released on parole for good behavior on 6 September 2007, and between 2007 and 2008, both cases would be dismissed, with the judge who presided over the Marzo paraguayo case opined that it is not known where the shots came from that night. The dismissal was criticized by opposition leaders, who said it was part of an agreement between Oviedo and then-President Nicanor Duarte Frutos so that Oviedo could present himself as candidate for president in the 2008 elections and act as a spoiler candidate who would subtract votes from the opposition. Argaña's son, Félix Argaña, stated "I believe that nobody doubts that there is a political agreement behind all this; between Colorados both pro-government and dissidents; even Nicanor himself publicly praises Oviedo, and Oviedo returns the courtesy". Similar views were expressed by other leaders of the civil and political society of Paraguay, surprised that after nine years of process, many of those accused of being involved in the massacre alongside Oviedo were suddenly absolved. Oviedo died in a helicopter crash on 2 February 2013.

On 23 October 1999, Pablo Vera Esteche was arrested in Paraguay. He said the murder, for which he and two other gunmen were paid a total of $300,000, was authorised by Cubas and Oviedo. Vera Esteche was sentenced to 20 years on 24 October (reduced to 18 years four years later). His accomplices were also jailed for lengthy sentences.

== In literature ==
The Marzo paraguayo appears in Paraguayan literature, especially in epic poetry. There are also novels and stories such as La noche de los francotiradores ("The Night of the Snipers"), a story by Catalo Bogado, and El país en una plaza ("The Country in a Square"), a novel by Andrés Colmán Gutiérrez.

== Legacy ==
The 2017 Paraguayan political crisis, in which a series of protests began in response to a constitutional amendment that would permit the President to run for re-election, during which demonstrators set fire to the Congress building, were sometimes referred to as "the second Marzo paraguayo" due to also taking place in March, or as "Cartes's Marzo paraguayo" in reference to then-President Horacio Cartes, whom the opposition and protesters held responsible for the crisis.
