= Blas Riquelme =

Paraguayan politician and businessman

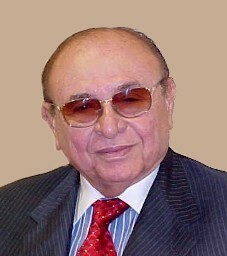
- Official portrait, 2003

Senator of Paraguay
- In office 30 June 1989 – 30 June 2008

President of the Colorado Party
- In office 1991–1994
- Preceded by: Luis María Argaña
- Succeeded by: Eugenio Sanabria Cantero

Personal details
- Born: Blas Nicolás Riquelme Centurión; February 3, 1929 Lambaré, Central Department, Paraguay
- Died: September 2, 2012 (aged 83) Asunción, Paraguay
- Party: Colorado Party
- Spouse: Licy Stella Yanes
- Children: 4
- Occupation: Businessman; politician

Blas Nicolás Riquelme Centurión (3 February 1929 – 2 September 2012) was a Paraguayan politician and businessman.

== Career ==
He was a member of the Senate of Paraguay for the Colorado Party from 1989 to 2008, and was elected President of the party, succeeding Luis María Argaña; he resigned in 1994. He was a candidate in the Colorado Party's 1996 primary election for the 1998 presidential election, backed by Lino Oviedo. He was leader of the Movimiento Tradicionalismo Democrático (TRADEM), and one of the major financiers of the Colorado Party. He was President of the Chamber of Industry until 1984.

As a businessman, Riquelme was director/president of a number of companies, including Cereales S.A. (flour and cereals); Cervecera Asunción S.A. and Cervecera Itapúa S.A. (beer); Cadena Real S.A. (supermarkets); Campo Morumbí S.A. (farming); and Cristalera Asunción S.A. (glass).

He is also a major landowner. In 1985 he ordered the removal of 100 Mbayá people from his 75,000 hectare landholding in the Alto Paraná Department; he had previously pressured them for ten years to leave their ancestral Paso Romero community, after he had purchased the property.

In 2012 the violent removal of occupying farmers from Riquelme's land in the Canindeyú Department sparked the impeachment of Fernando Lugo. He has been unsuccessfully sued by farmers alleging irregularities in his 1975 acquisition of land (under the dictatorship of Alfredo Stroessner), following Truth and Justice Commission conclusions of irregularities.

Party political offices
Preceded by Luis María Argaña	President of the Colorado Party ? - 1994	Succeeded by Eugenio Sanabria Cantero
