= 2000 Paraguayan vice presidential election =

- 13 August 2000
- Turnout: 60.72% (▼19.82pp)
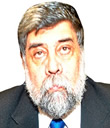

Candidate	Julio César Franco	Félix Argaña
Party	PLRA	Colorado
Popular vote	597,431	587,498
Percentage	49.64%	48.82%
Vice President before election
Vacant (due to assassination of Luis María Argaña)
Vice President-elect
Julio César Franco
PLRA

Vice presidential elections were held in Paraguay on 13 August 2000, following the assassination of Luis María Argaña. The result was a victory for Julio César Franco of the Authentic Radical Liberal Party, who received 49.6% of the vote. Voter turnout was 60.7%.

== Results ==
Candidate	Party	Votes	%
Julio César Franco	Authentic Radical Liberal Party	597,431	49.64
Félix Argaña	Colorado Party	587,498	48.82
Ricardo Buman	Paraguayan Humanist Party	18,496	1.54
Total		1,203,425	100.00
Valid votes		1,203,425	96.25
Invalid/blank votes		46,841	3.75
Total votes		1,250,266	100.00
Registered voters/turnout		2,059,164	60.72
Source: Nohlen
