= Francisco Oviedo =

Paraguayan politician

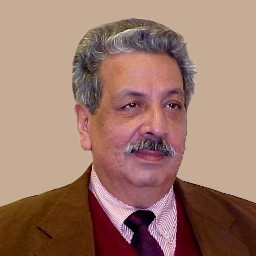

Minister of Finance of Paraguay
- In office 3 October 2000 – 6 February 2002
- President: Luis González Macchi
- Preceded by: Federico Zayas
- Succeeded by: James Spalding

Interior Minister of Paraguay
- In office 6 February 2002 – 2003
- President: Luis González Macchi
- Preceded by: Julio César Fanego

Vice President of Paraguay
- In office 21 November 2007 – 15 August 2008
- President: Nicanor Duarte Frutos
- Preceded by: Luis Castiglioni
- Succeeded by: Federico Franco

Personal details
- Party: Colorado Party

Francisco Arcidio Oviedo Brítez is a Paraguayan politician from the Colorado Party. He served as 27th Vice President of Paraguay from 21 November 2007 to 15 August 2008.

== Political career ==
From 2000 to 2003 Oviedo held a number of ministerial positions in the cabinet of Luis González Macchi. In 2007 Oviedo became a senator in the Paraguayan Senate. Shortly after, he was elected in a special election to succeed Luis Castiglioni as Vice President of the Republic. This was for the remainder of the presidential term, until 15 August 2008.

=== Presidential aspiration ===
Nicanor Duarte Frutos offered his resignation as President of Paraguay to the Paraguayan Congress on June 23, 2008. It was assumed that Oviedo, as vice president, would succeed him. However, President Duarte's resignation was not accepted, and Oviedo therefore did not assume the presidency.

Political offices
Preceded by Luis Castiglioni	Vice President of Paraguay; 2007-2008	Succeeded by Federico Franco
