= Ángel Roberto Seifart =

Paraguayan politician (1941–2018)

Vice President of Paraguay
- In office 15 August 1993 – 15 August 1998
- President: Juan Carlos Wasmosy
- Preceded by: Post abolished Luis Alberto Riart (1940)
- Succeeded by: Luis María Argaña

Personal details
- Born: 12 September 1940 Asunción, Paraguay
- Died: 2 July 2018 (aged 77) Asunción, Paraguay
- Party: Colorado Party

Ángel Roberto Seifart (12 September 1940 – 2 July 2018) was a Paraguayan senior politician from the Colorado Party.

Seifart was a judge during the Alfredo Stroessner era. Later he was minister of education in the military government of Andrés Rodríguez. In the 1993 Paraguayan general election he was elected Vice President of Paraguay as running mate of Juan Carlos Wasmosy for the period from 15 August 1993 to 15 August 1998 and also a minister in the cabinet of Raúl Cubas Grau.
