= Viñas Cué =

Paraguayan military prison

La Prisión Militar de Viñas Cué
- Interactive map of La Prisión Militar de Viñas Cué
- Location: Paraguay; 25.2350°S 57.5796°W
- Status: Operational

Notable prisoners
- Lino Oviedo (formerly)

Viñas Cué is a Paraguayan military prison a short distance from the capital, Asunción. It holds military and political prisoners.

== Background ==
The prison is known for holding some of Paraguay's highest profile prisoners, particularly political detainees. In 2004, it became known for being the site where former Army chief Lino Oviedo was detained on his return from exile. In 2007, he was released from prison.

Other political detainees at the prison have included Enzo Cardozo Jiménez, and former governor Óscar Ñoño Núñez. In 2018, former Attorney General Javier Díaz Verón was transferred to the facility after arguing his life was in danger while being held in another prison while awaiting trial for corruption charges. He was later acquitted. In 2020, congressman Ulises Quintana was released after spending 10 months held at Viñas Cué while he was under suspicion for criminal association.

Other high-profile prisoners have been transferred to the facility to keep them outside of the general Paraguayan prison population. In 2023, Miguel Angel Insfran Galeano, the suspect behind the murder of a high profile anti-mafia prosecutor in Colombia was held at the prison after being extradited from Brazil.

In 2025, the prison again gained attention as Gianina García Troche, the wife of Uruguayan drug trafficker Sebastián Marset, was transferred to the prison. The move was questioned by Paraguayan media as Troche is not a military or political prisoner, nor is the site a maximum security facility.
