= Gloria Penayo =

First Lady of Paraguay (born 1962)

Maria Gloria Penayo de Duarte (née Solaeche, born 10 November 1962) is the former First Lady of Paraguay as the wife of Nicanor Duarte Frutos, President of Paraguay from 2003–2008. She is a convert to the Mennonites.

In 2005, she was nominated to be an ambassador of the United Nations Food and Agriculture Organization for its alimentation world day. By 2010, she was one of the organization's ambassadors, along with others such as Pierre Cardin, Lea Salonga, Gong Li and Dionne Warwick.
