= Luis Castiglioni =

Paraguayan politician (born 1962)

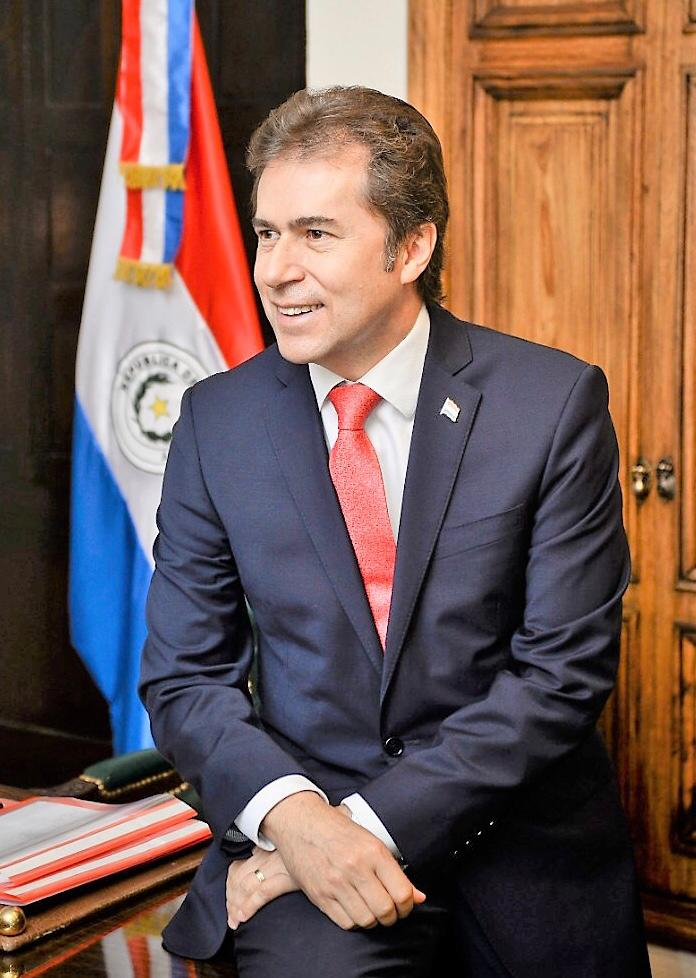
- Castiglioni in 2019

Minister of Foreign Affairs
- In office 15 August 2018 – 29 July 2019
- President: Mario Abdo Benítez
- Preceded by: Eladio Loizaga
- Succeeded by: Antonio Rivas Palacios

Vice President of Paraguay
- In office 15 August 2003 – 15 October 2007
- President: Nicanor Duarte
- Preceded by: Julio César Franco
- Succeeded by: Francisco Oviedo

Personal details
- Born: 31 July 1962 (age 63) Itacurubí del Rosario, Paraguay
- Party: Colorado Party

Luis Alberto Castiglioni Soria (born 31 July 1962) is a Paraguayan politician. He was Vice President of Paraguay for the Colorado Party from 2003 to 2007.

== Career ==
Castiglioni was born in Itacurubí del Rosario and obtained a qualification in civil engineering from the Catholic University of Asunción. His national political career began in 1984 as leader of Colorado party's juvenile wing. In 2003 Nicanor Duarte chose him as his running mate in the 2003 presidential election. Castiglioni served as Vice President of Paraguay from 15 August 2003 to October 2007, when he resigned in order to pursue the presidency.

He was a candidate for the Colorado Party's nomination in the April 2008 presidential election. Initial results in the December 2007 party primary election showed rival candidate Blanca Ovelar, who is backed by President Nicanor Duarte, narrowly defeating Castiglioni; however, the result was disputed, leading to a recount. On 21 January 2008, the Colorado Party electoral commission announced that Ovelar had won with 45.04% of the vote against 44.5% for Castiglioni. Castiglioni said that he would never accept defeat, claiming to have proof that 30,000 votes in his favor were "stolen", and said that he would take the matter to court.

Political offices
Preceded by Julio César Franco	Vice President of Paraguay; 2003-2007	Succeeded by Francisco Oviedo
