= Julio César Franco (politician) =

Paraguayan politician (born 1951)

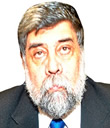

Vice President of Paraguay
- In office 2 September 2000 – 16 October 2002
- President: Luis Ángel González Macchi
- Preceded by: Luis María Argaña
- Succeeded by: Luis Castiglioni

Personal details
- Born: Julio César Ramón Franco Gómez; 17 April 1951 (age 75) Fernando de la Mora, Paraguay
- Party: Authentic Radical Liberal Party

Julio César Ramón Franco Gómez (born 17 April 1951) is a Paraguayan politician of the Authentic Radical Liberal Party. He was vice president from 2000 to 2002, served as senator from 1998 to 2003, and was presidential candidate for the Authentic Radical Liberal Party in the 2003 election, losing to Nicanor Duarte of the Colorado Party. He was elected to the Senate again in 2008.

== Career ==
Born on 17 April 1951 in Fernando de la Mora, Paraguay, Franco is a surgeon by profession, with a degree from the National University of Córdoba, Argentina. Following the March 1999 murder of Vice President Luis María Argaña, Senator Franco was elected in direct election on 13 August 2000 to be Vice President of Paraguay. He served the remainder of the four-year-term from September 2000 to 2002.

== Personal life ==
Franco is the brother of Federico Franco, who became President of Paraguay in June 2012 following the impeachment of Fernando Lugo. He is the chairman of the Authentic Radical Liberal Party.

Political offices
Preceded by Luis María Argaña	Vice President of Paraguay; 2000-2002	Succeeded by Luis Castiglioni
