= 1996 Paraguayan coup attempt =

Paraguayan political event

1996 Paraguayan coup d'état attempt
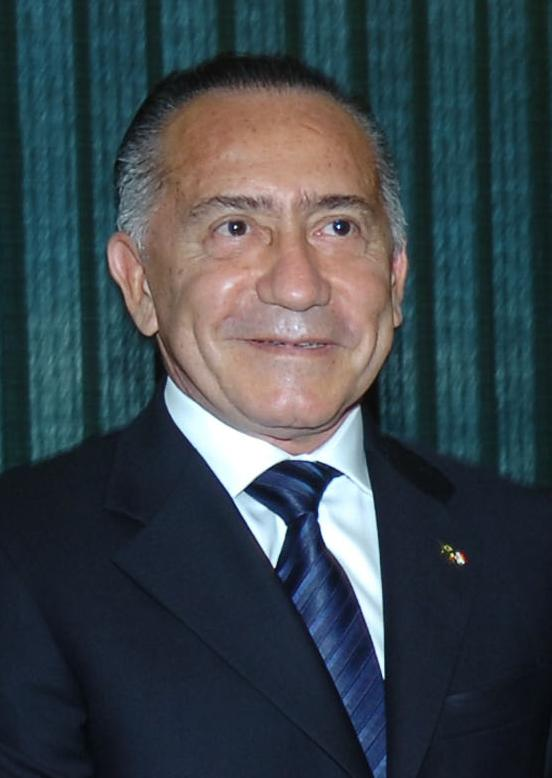
- Then-Army General Lino Oviedo (pictured in 2008) declared himself in rebellion against President Wasmosy
Date	22 – 25 April 1996
Location	Asunción, Paraguay
Result	Coup failed: Paraguay placed under a state of exception; President Juan Carlos Wasmosy retains the presidency; Oviedo goes into retirement and is prosecuted

Belligerents
Government of Paraguay; ANR (Wasmosy supporters)	Paraguayan Army members loyal to Lino Oviedo; ANR (Oviedo supporters or oviedistas)

Commanders and leaders
Juan Carlos Wasmosy	Lino Oviedo

The 1996 Paraguayan coup d'état attempt was an attempted coup d'état in Paraguay that took place between 22 April and 25 April 1996 with the purpose of deposing then President of Paraguay Juan Carlos Wasmosy. The attempted coup was undertaken by then Army General Lino Oviedo, who declared himself in rebellion against the president for forcing Oviedo into retirement. The attempted coup caused a serious political crisis that would last for three days, being the first serious crisis to occur after the fall of Alfredo Stroessner's dictatorship in the 1989 Paraguayan coup d'état, and its consequences would extend at least until the beginning of the following decade.

== Background ==
Lino Oviedo, together with General Andrés Rodríguez, played an important role in the 1989 Paraguayan coup d'état that deposed Alfredo Stroessner after 35 years in power, and later on, General Oviedo would provide decisive support for the victory of Juan Carlos Wasmosy in the 1993 general election, in which Wasmosy became Paraguay's first civilian president after the fall of Stroessner.

== Events ==
External image
- Photograph obtained by a photojournalist from the Paraguayan newspaper Última Hora, showing Oviedo leaving the Palacio de los López on the afternoon of 25 April, when he arrived to be sworn in as Minister of Defense, only to be informed that he would not be appointed, and that instead he was going into retirement as a military officer. Note the small bandage on his forehead, for a wound reportedly done after he hit his forehead onto a car door while nervous.

On 22 April 1996, Wasmosy summoned Oviedo to inform him of his retirement. However, Oviedo ignored the order, barricaded himself in the Army barracks and threatened to carry out a coup d'état unless the president resigned. This caused thousands of people, mainly young people, to take to the streets that same day to protest for considering the act an "assault on democracy". Wasmosy sought refuge at the United States embassy and, according to some reports, even wrote his resignation due to fear of the strong military power Oviedo had at the time, but later scrapped the idea when he felt supported by the protests and international pressure. However, Wasmosy would deny afterwards having considered to resign.

On 24 April, Wasmosy announced his intention to appoint Oviedo as Minister of Defense, ostensibly with the aim of neutralizing him. The appointment only exacerbated the demonstrations, which occupied the squares in front of the then-building of Congress (now the Cultural Center of the Republic) and even the Palacio de los López, asking now not only the arrest of Oviedo, but also Wasmosy's resignation out of cowardice. Finally, around noon on 25 April, Wasmosy revoked Oviedo's appointment as Minister of Defense, under strong political, diplomatic and popular pressure from the general public, regional governments, and especially the United States government.

After Wasmosy revoked Oviedo's appointment, Wasmosy removed Oviedo from the army on charges of attempting a coup against him, but without bringing any judicial charges. However, in 1997, after Oviedo's victory in the Colorado Party's primary presidential elections, Oviedo was arrested and charged in a military court for that crime, which took away his chances to run for the presidency. This would become the main precedent of the Marzo paraguayo, which would take place three years later, in 1999.

== See also ==
- 1989 Paraguayan coup d'état
- Marzo paraguayo
- 2000 Paraguayan coup d'état attempt
