= Federico Franco =

49th President of Paraguay (2012–2013)

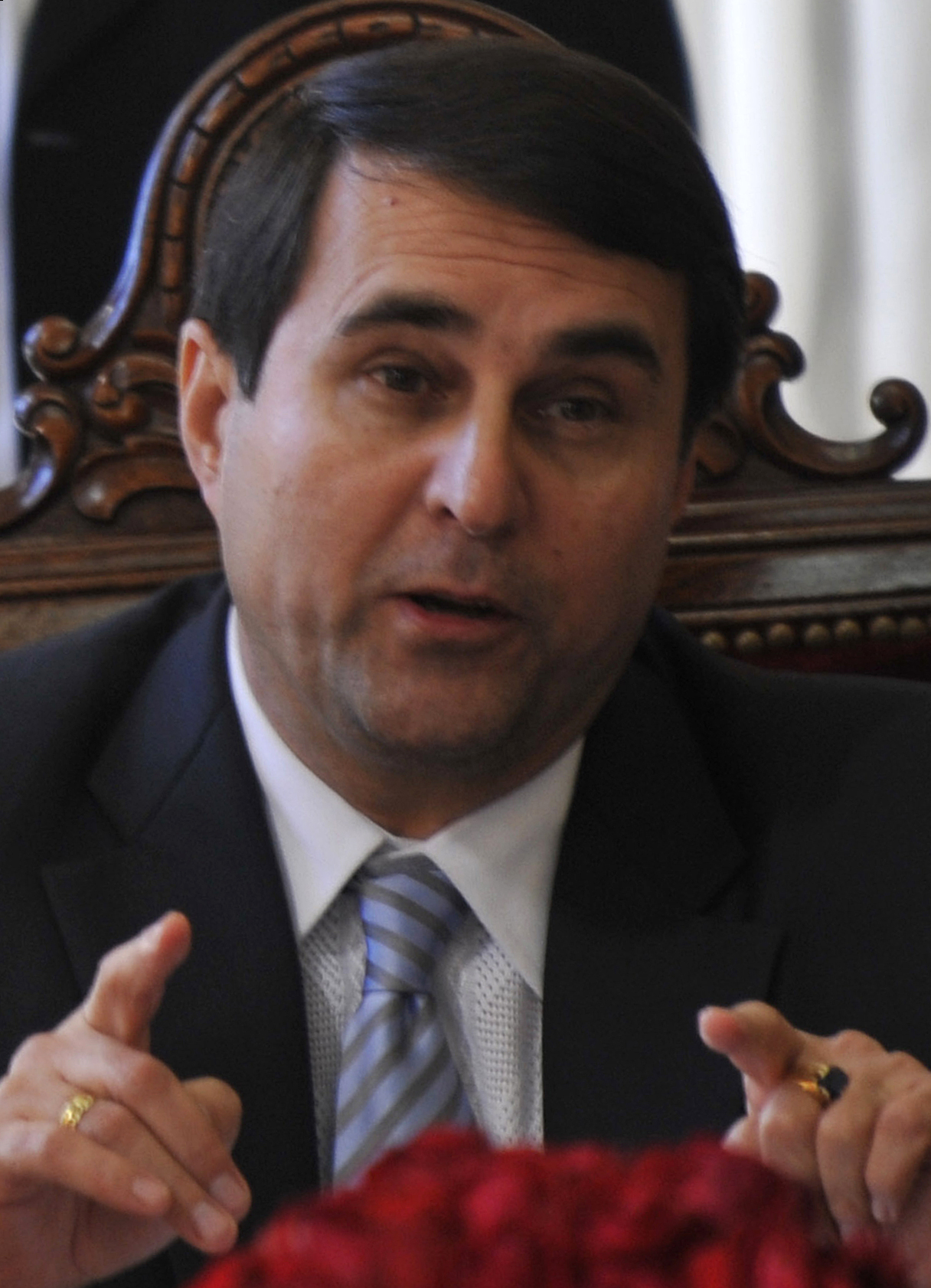
- Franco in 2012

49th President of Paraguay
- In office 22 June 2012 – 15 August 2013
- Vice President: Óscar Denis
- Preceded by: Fernando Lugo
- Succeeded by: Horacio Cartes

Vice President of Paraguay
- In office 15 August 2008 – 22 June 2012
- President: Fernando Lugo
- Preceded by: Francisco Oviedo
- Succeeded by: Óscar Denis

Personal details
- Born: Luis Federico Franco Gómez; 24 July 1962 (age 64) Asunción, Paraguay
- Party: Authentic Radical Liberal Party
- Other political affiliations: Patriotic Alliance for Change (2007–10)
- Spouse: Emilia Alfaro (married 1982)
- Children: Four
- Education: National University of Asuncion

Luis Federico Franco Gómez (born 24 July 1962) is a Paraguayan politician who was President of Paraguay from June 2012 until August 2013. A member of the Authentic Radical Liberal Party (PLRA), he was elected as Vice President of Paraguay in the 2008 presidential election as the running mate of Fernando Lugo; he took office in August 2008. Following Lugo's impeachment by the Senate on 22 June 2012, he succeeded Lugo as President to complete the presidential mandate until 15 August 2013.

Franco is a surgeon by profession. He is the brother of Julio César Franco, senator and former chairman of Authentic Radical Liberal Party, and also a former Vice President. Federico Franco is also former chairman of PLRA and was Governor of Central Department from 2003 to 2008.

== Early life ==
Federico Franco was born in the city of Asunción on 24 July 1962. He was married on 20 February 1982 to Emilia Alfaro, elected deputy of Paraguay for the period 2008–2013. He is the father of four children.

Franco studied primary school in the Dominican Republic, its baseline were conducted at the National College of the Capital. His secondary education took place in the Apostolic College San Jose, all in Asunción.

As for the tertiary level, he hoped to become a doctor so he entered the Faculty of Medical Sciences, National University of Asunción. Upon completion of the coursework in 1986 he received the title of Surgeon with an overall average of 4.56 to 5.00. Then he obtained a graduate degree in Internal Medicine.

== Medical career ==
The Franco family owns a hospital in the city of Fernando de la Mora (Sanatorio Franco), he and his brothers owned, staffed since its inception. During the period 1990–1991 he served as head of interns and residents 1CCM Hospital de Clinicas (HC), also as head of emergency call, 1CCM (HC). He was an instructor of medical semiology (1991–1992), head of National Guard Hospital (1994–1996) and chief of internal medicine residents from the same place. He was also chief room of the National Hospital Medical Clinic and head of cardiology ward of the hospital.

On 24 June 1991 was a member of the Paraguayan Society of Internal Medicine and member of the Executive Committee of the Paraguayan Society of Internal Medicine.

== Political career ==
Federico Franco was governor of the Central department during the 2003–2008 period, for the Authentic Radical Liberal Party. The party discussed in 2008 if they should support the ticket of Lugo in the presidential election or share the candidacy with him; the second option prevailed and Franco ran for the vice-presidency under Lugo's ticket. He was critical of the presidency of Lugo, such as with the management of lands and the 2009 controversy about Lugo's son.

Lugo was impeached on 21 June 2012 and removed from office a day later. The UNASUR expressed concerns that Lugo's removal amounted to a coup d'état, since Lugo had only two hours to prepare a defense. Federico Franco then became the new president, taking the oath of office an hour later. He served the balance of Lugo's term, which lasted until August 2013. He was barred from running for a full term in 2013; the Constitution does not allow a president to run for reelection even if he serves a partial term.

=== Presidency ===
One of Franco's first acts was to replace Rubén Candia Amarilla as Interior Minister with Carmelo Caballero. Candia Amarilla had briefly succeeded Carlos Filizzola as Fernando Lugo's Interior Minister, after Filizzola resigned on 15 June. Franco also promptly resumed stalled negotiations with Rio Tinto Alcan over a $4 billion aluminum plant and approved sales of genetically modified soy beans from Monsanto. He also appoints several agribusiness representatives to his government. Budget cuts in social programmes are announced, as well as lay-offs in the public sector.

==== Corruption ====
In spite of its brevity and of the initial good economic situation of Paraguay, the presidential management of Federico Franco was characterized by the significant increase of the financial deficit of the country. After his departure from power, the new government blamed him for having plundered the state's resources through a vast system of corruption and clientelism organized around the Liberal Party.

The former president was subsequently denounced by several of his political collaborators (one of whom himself was sentenced to 6 years in prison for corruption) for misappropriations of public money made on his initiative.

From 2008, when he took office in the government, to its exit of the power in 2012, his fortune increased by almost 750%.

==== Itaipu Binacional ====
In August 2012, Franco announced in the media that his government would conduct audits of the Itaipu Pension Fund (Cajubi) to uncover millions in misappropriated funds and that all avenues for recovering the lost funds would be exhausted.

On August 10, 2012, ABC Color reported that mutual accusations were hindering efforts to recover funds from Cajubi, and that the author of the blog “El Engaño Guaraní” (The Guarani Deception) was Guatemalan Eduardo García Obregón.

In August and September 2012, during his presidency, the fee agreement for former prosecutor and Cajubi's lawyer, Rafael Fernández (signed during the administration of his predecessor, Fernando Lugo), was rejected and renegotiated. The new Legal Director of Itaipu, Eusebio Ramon Ayala, described the agreement as quasi-criminal and exploitative. Fernández's fee was reduced from USD 4 million to USD 2 million.

==== Cabinet ====
- Ministry of Foreign Affairs: José Félix Fernández Estigarribia
- Ministry of Finance: Manuel Ferreira Brusquetti
- Ministry of Internal Affairs: Carmelo Caballero
- Ministry of National Defence: María Liz García de Arnold
- Ministry of Public Works and Communications: Enrique Salyn Buzarquis
- Ministry of Public Health and Social Welfare: Antonio Arbo
- Ministry of Agriculture and Stockbreeding: Enzo Cardozo
- Ministry of Education and Culture: Horacio Galeano Perrone
- Ministry of Justice and Labor: María Lorena Segovia Azucas

Political offices
Preceded by Francisco Oviedo	Vice President of Paraguay; 2008–2012	Succeeded by Óscar Denis
Preceded by Fernando Lugo	President of Paraguay; 2012–2013	Succeeded by Horacio Cartes
