= Juan de Mena, Paraguay =

Juan de Mena
- District
- Location within Paraguay
- Coordinates: 24°50′25″S 56°30′57″W
- Country: Paraguay
- Department: Cordillera

Population (2022)
  - Total: 6,341
- Time zone: UTC-4 (PYT)
  - Summer (DST): UTC-3 (PYST)

Juan de Mena is a district of Cordillera Department in Paraguay. It is named after the Spanish Renaissance poet Juan de Mena, and is located 88 metres above sea level. The district is adjacent to the Arroyos y Esteros district, and is surrounded by the lowlands of the Manduvira, Yhaguy, and Hondo rivers.

== Demographics ==
As of the 2022 census, there were 6,341 people in the district: 3,163 (49.9%) were male and 3,178 (50.1%) were female, with a median age of 28.

== Notable people ==
- Lino Cesar Oviedo, general and politician
- Pablo Giménez, footballer
