= Blanca Ovelar =

Paraguayan politician (born 1957)

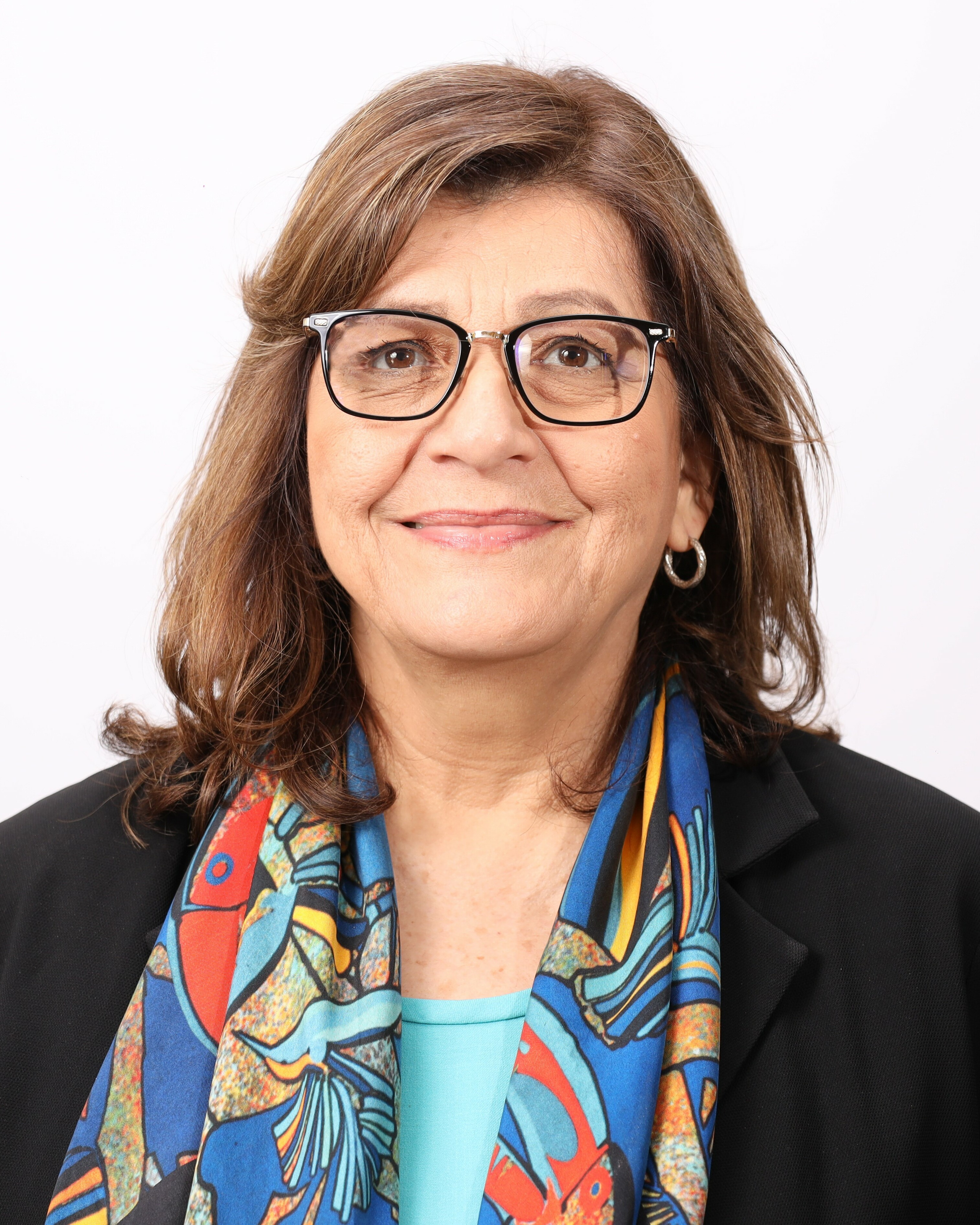
- Official portrait, 2023

Senator of Paraguay
- Incumbent
- Assumed office 30 June 2013

Minister of Education and Culture
- In office 15 April 2002 – 2 July 2007
- President: Nicanor Duarte Frutos
- Preceded by: Darío Zárate Arellano
- Succeeded by: María Esther Jiménez

Personal details
- Born: Blanca Margarita Ovelar; 2 September 1957 (age 68) Concepción, Concepción Department, Paraguay
- Party: Colorado Party
- Spouse: Ramón Duarte Rodas
- Children: 3
- Occupation: Teacher; politician

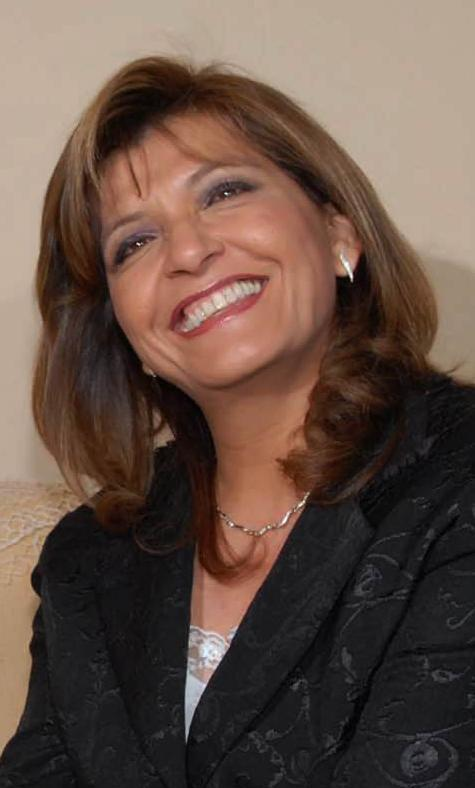
Ovelar in 2008

Blanca Margarita Ovelar de Duarte (born 2 September 1957) is a Paraguayan teacher and politician, currently serving as senator since 2013.

She was the Colorado Party's nominee for president in the April 2008 presidential election, in which she was defeated.

She previously served as Minister of Education under President Nicanor Duarte, and Duarte endorsed her bid for the presidency. Initial results showed Ovelar narrowly defeating her rival for the nomination, former Vice President Luis Castiglioni, in the party's primary, held in December 2007; however, the result was disputed, leading to a recount. On 21 January, the Colorado Party electoral commission announced that Ovelar had won with 45.04% of the vote against 44.5% for Castiglioni, although Castiglioni continued to claim victory.

Not only would Ovelar have been Paraguay's first female president if elected, but she was the first woman to run for president. Opposition candidate Fernando Lugo won the election, held on 20 April 2008, thereby ousting the Colorado Party after 61 years of continuous rule. Ovelar conceded the race to Lugo at about 9 PM local time on election night.

According to major media outlets and other sources in Paraguay, Ovelar's campaigns were illicitly financed with money from Itaipu Binacional and its subsidiaries Cajubi and Tesai, with the involvement of Nicanor Duarte and the Director General of Itaipu, Victor Bernal.
