= Cultural Center of the Republic =

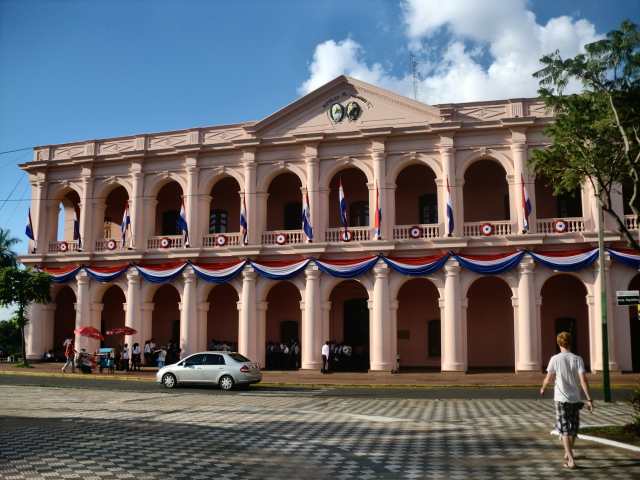
- The Cultural Center of the Republic

- Location within Paraguay
- Former names: Cabildo of Asunción

General information
- Location: Asunción, Paraguay
- Coordinates: 25.2798°S 57.6337°W
- Construction started: 1846
- Completed: 1857

Height
- Architectural: Italianate

The Cultural Center of the Republic in Asunción, Paraguay, operates in the building of the Town Council (Cabildo), and has as main purpose the strengthening of conscience in all the matters that have to do with national history, and gives the building where it resides the value of a monument.

== History ==
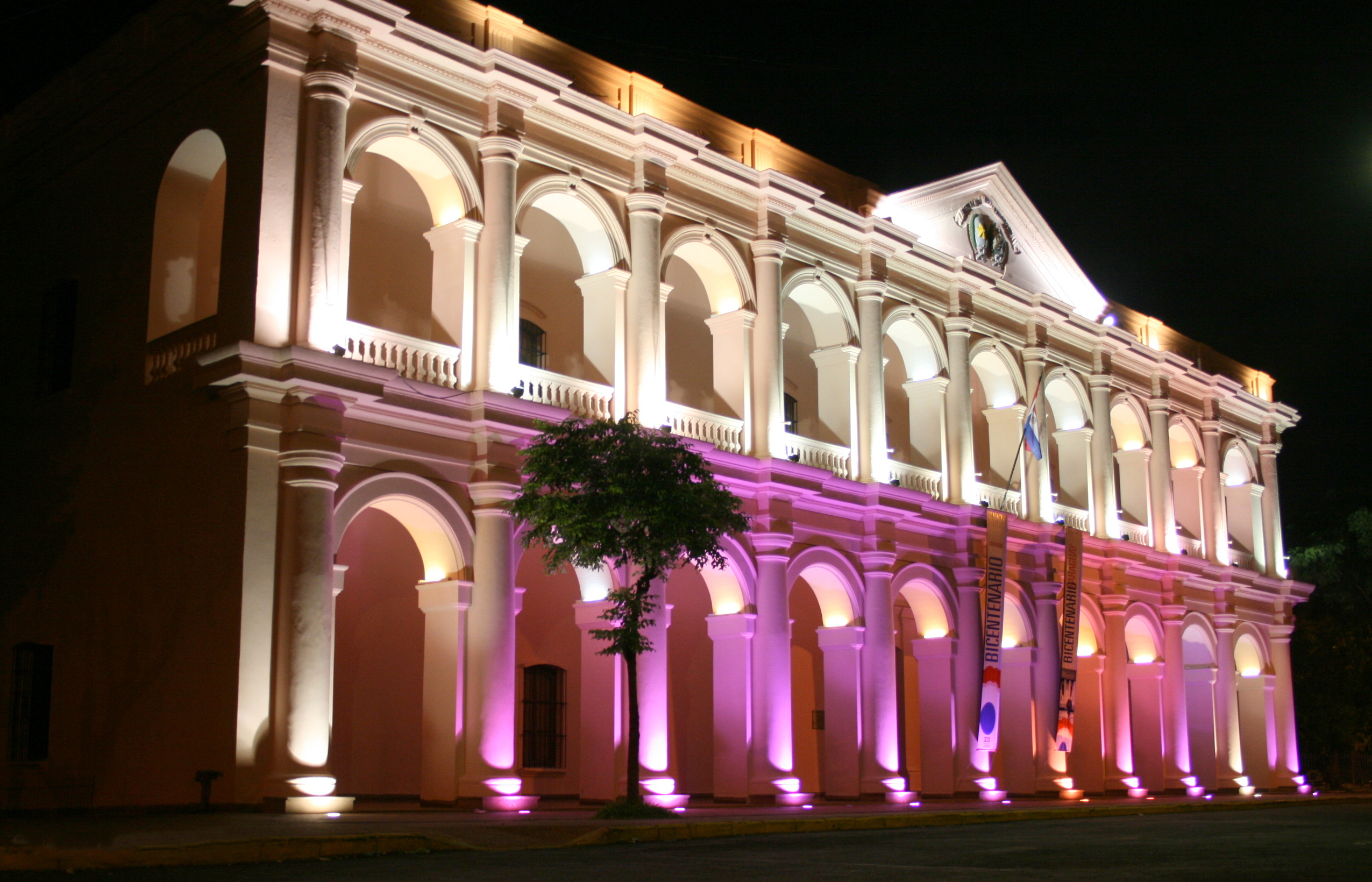
The old Cabildo illuminated at night.

It was open on March 14, 2004 by initiative of the senator, Carlos Mateo Balmelli, who was President of the National Congress at the time, founder and honorary member of the Center, with the support of all members of the Legislative Branch.

It has the objective of being a place open to everyone, with no discrimination, which operates in the old building of the Town Council, a colonial Spanish institution that, in America, granted the title of City to the first citizen establishment of Río de la Plata.

The building was also the beginning of the country, when on September 16, 1541 the governor Domingo Martínez de Irala established the military fort Nuestra Señora de la Asunción, founded by Juan de Salazar y Espinoza on August 15, 1537.

The building was also place of the National Congress. It was built in 1844 to be seat of the Executive and Legislative Branch. It was one of the most important constructions that the government of Carlos Antonio López (1844-1862) set about at the time. It was seat of the Executive until November 15, 1894, when the Executive moved to the Palace of Government built by Marshal López, and then the building became seat of the National Congress until 2003.

== Organization ==
It has Permanent Council of Advisers, with members from the International Association of Art Critics, from which Augusto Roa Bastos was member; also counts with several specialized people in different areas.

== Distribution of the event halls and museums ==
When the building became the Cultural Center of the Republic, it had to be reorganized and determine which places would serve as halls for exhibits and which as administrative area.

For all the different programs, the special conditions of every hall along with the objects to be exhibited and the coherent distribution of the collections were taken in consideration.

It is worth mentioning that the Cultural Center was the place where was held the service before the funeral for Augusto Roa Bastos in 2005. The Cultural Center has several halls that have been given to different museums of the city; there is a Hall of Clay, Hall of Sacred Art, Hall Guido Boggiani, Hall of Music, Hall Cabildo (Town Council), Hall of Film, and the library of Paraguayan writers Augusto Roa Bastos. It also has 2 halls for temporary exhibits.

In the first floor are located the spaces used for exhibit of different plastic arts from all periods of Paraguayan history. In the west wing, the main hall in the first floor it is used for thematic temporary exhibits and presentation of events such as theater, concerts, ballets, etc. The near halls, of minor proportions, serve as support spaces for the main hall.

=== Hall of Clay ===
The Clay Museum was created in 1979, and in it is exhibited, in equal conditions, the popular art, the native art and the urban art of Paraguay. The pieces of popular art are the creations of the different rustic communities. The pieces of native art are from all the different Native American groups that lived in the territory that is Paraguay as well as other parts of Latin America.

=== Hall of Sacred Art ===
The collection of sacred art started with the personal collection of the first Paraguayan Archbishop, Juan Sinforiano Bogarín. The hall exhibits wood carvings of the old Jesuit and FranciscanMissions from the colonial time and the 20th century, as well as other objects of sacred art and pieces of artifacts related with the national history.

=== Hall of Cabildo ===
In this hall are exhibit all objects with patrimonial value that are testimony of the roles that played the building as seat of the political branches of the country.

=== Hall of Music ===
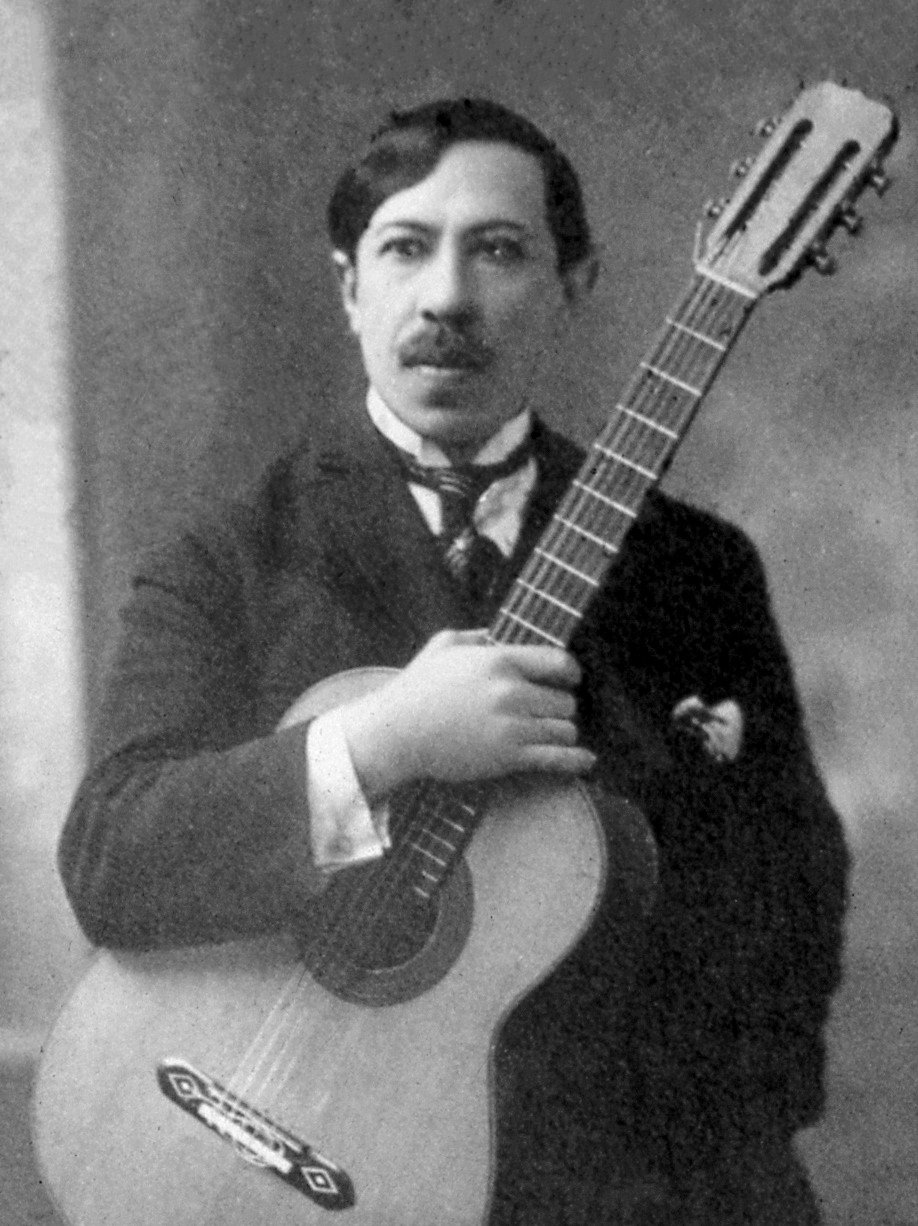
Agustin Barrios

Located in the second floor it has objects and scores that belonged to the great masters of Paraguayan music. Some of the more valuables items are the ones that belonged to Luis Alberto del Paraná, one of the most important exponents of Paraguayan music; and the guitar that belonged to Agustín Pío Barrios.

=== Hall of Film and Video ===
It has a Conference Hall and the Library “Augusto Roa Bastos” for artistic activities such as visual arts, music, literature, theater and ballet. Activities that are encourage with exhibits, concerts, presentations and conferences.
