= Raúl Cubas Grau =

45th President of Paraguay (1998–99)

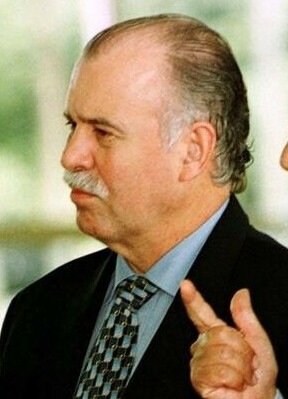
- Cubas Grau in 1999

45th President of Paraguay
- In office August 15, 1998 – March 29, 1999
- Vice President: Luis María Argaña
- Preceded by: Juan Carlos Wasmosy
- Succeeded by: Luis González Macchi

Personal details
- Born: August 23, 1943 (age 82) Asunción, Paraguay
- Party: Colorado Party
- Spouse: Mirtha Leonor Gusinky

Raúl Alberto Cubas Grau (born 23 August 1943) is a Paraguayan politician and electrical engineer who served as the 45th President of Paraguay from 1998 until his resignation in 1999.

A colorado and loyal follower of Lino Oviedo, who could not run for president due to his imprisonment, Cubas was elected in 1998 alongside his running mate, Luis María Argaña, a colorado caudillo who had become Oviedo's biggest political rival.

In March 1999, large protests against Cubas' government erupted following the assassination of Vice President Argaña. As a result of these days of social unrest, which came to be known as the Marzo Paraguayo, Cubas resigned and was succeeded by the president of the Senate, Luis González Macchi. Cubas' presidency only lasted six months.

== Early life ==
Cubas Grau studied Engineering at the National University of Asunción.

He was a member of the Colorado Party. Prior to being elected president, he worked as an electrical engineer, and served as Minister of Finance of Paraguay for a brief period in April 1996 under president Juan Carlos Wasmosy until he resigned.

== Presidency (1998–1999) ==
When the 1998 campaign began, army general Lino Oviedo named Cubas as his running mate. However, a few months before the election, Oviedo was sentenced to 10 years in prison for his role in a 1996 coup attempt and was disqualified. Cubas took his place on the ballot and won the May 1998 election with 54% of the vote under the slogan "Cubas in government, Oviedo in power." To date, it is the only time since the restoration of democracy in Paraguay that a presidential candidate has won an outright majority.

In June, the Paraguayan Congress passed a law that said that the president could not pardon anyone who had not served at least half of their prison term, a law which was seen to be made to avoid Cubas pardoning his former running mate Oviedo. In August, however, three days after his inauguration, Cubas reduced Oviedo's sentence to the time already served, effectively releasing him from jail. Despite an order from the Paraguayan Supreme Court in December 1998, Cubas refused to send Oviedo back to jail.

In response, the Chamber of Deputies voted to charge Cubas with abuse of power in February 1999. The vote was only two votes short of that necessary for a formal impeachment. Cubas' vice president, Luis María Argaña, who had been named as Cubas' running mate to prevent the Colorados from losing power but was leading the anti-Oviedo bloc in the Colorado Party, was assassinated on March 23, 1999, allegedly as a result of a dispute over the Oviedo release. His murder was allegedly done by a group with ties to Oviedo. Cubas was implicated and protests broke out. Thousands participated in public demonstrations led by striking workers, demanding that Cubas resign. Security forces were called out. Seven people were shot to death and dozens were injured when the demonstrations turned violent, in what became known as the Marzo paraguayo ("Paraguayan March").

Cubas' support virtually collapsed. The day after the assassination, the Chamber of Deputies voted overwhelmingly to impeach Cubas. Facing certain conviction and removal from office by the Senate, Cubas resigned on March 28, 1999, while Oviedo fled to Brazil. Oviedo returned to Paraguay in 2004 to face his charges both for the 1996 coup attempt and the killing of protesters during the Marzo paraguayo, and was immediately imprisoned. He was released on parole for good behavior on 6 September 2007, and between 2007 and 2008, both cases would be dismissed.

== Kidnapping and murder of daughter ==
In October 2004, his daughter Cecilia Cubas was kidnapped by gunmen near her Asunción apartment. Paraguayan security forces began an intense search for her, and Cubas paid a ransom of US$800,000. However, her body was found in the basement of a house outside Asunción in February 2005. She was 32 years old. Four men were arrested, including one with alleged ties to the Colombian rebel movement FARC. In July 2006, two suspects of the crime were granted refugee status in neighboring Bolivia.

Political offices
Preceded by Juan Carlos Wasmosy	President of Paraguay; 1998–1999	Succeeded by Luis Ángel González Macchi
