= Luis María Argaña =

Paraguayan politician and jurist (1932–1999)

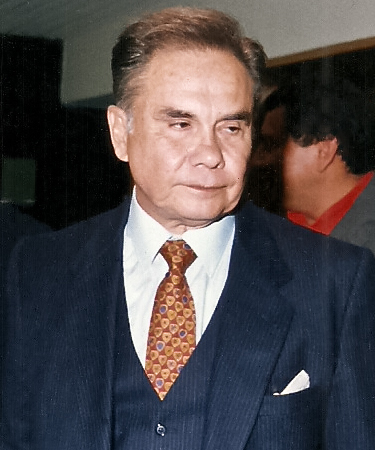

Vice President of Paraguay
- In office August 15, 1998 – March 23, 1999
- President: Raúl Cubas Grau
- Preceded by: Ángel Seifart
- Succeeded by: Julio César Franco

Personal details
- Born: October 3, 1932 Asunción, Paraguay
- Died: March 23, 1999 (aged 66) Asunción, Paraguay
- Cause of death: Assassination by gunshots
- Party: Colorado Party

Luis María del Corazón de Jesús Dionisio Argaña Ferraro (October 3, 1932 – March 23, 1999) was a Paraguayan politician and jurist. A prominent and influential member of the Colorado Party, he was a Supreme Court judge, unsuccessfully ran for the Colorado Party's nomination for president in the 1993 election and eventually was elected Vice-President in the 1998 election, but was assassinated seven months after assuming office in March 1999 at a time when it appeared likely that he would inherit the presidency from Raúl Cubas, who was on the verge of being impeached. The incident and its aftermath is known in Paraguay as Marzo paraguayo ("the Paraguayan March"). An airport in Paraguay, Dr. Luis María Argaña International Airport, is named for him.

== Career ==
Argaña graduated in law and social sciences from the Universidad Nacional de Asunción in 1958. He became a professor at the university, and entered politics, becoming a member of the Chamber of Deputies of Paraguay. He also became a judge, and was President of the Supreme Court of Paraguay (1983 - 1988).

During 1989–1990 he served as foreign minister.

Argaña was a judge during Paraguay's long-lasting military dictatorship under Alfredo Stroessner. He has been accused of turning a blind eye to cases of torture and political killings. Stroessner dissident Joel Filártiga accused Argaña of blocking the screening in Paraguay of the 1991 TV movie One Man's War, depicting Filártiga's search for justice for the 1976 death of his son at the hands of Stroessner's secret police.

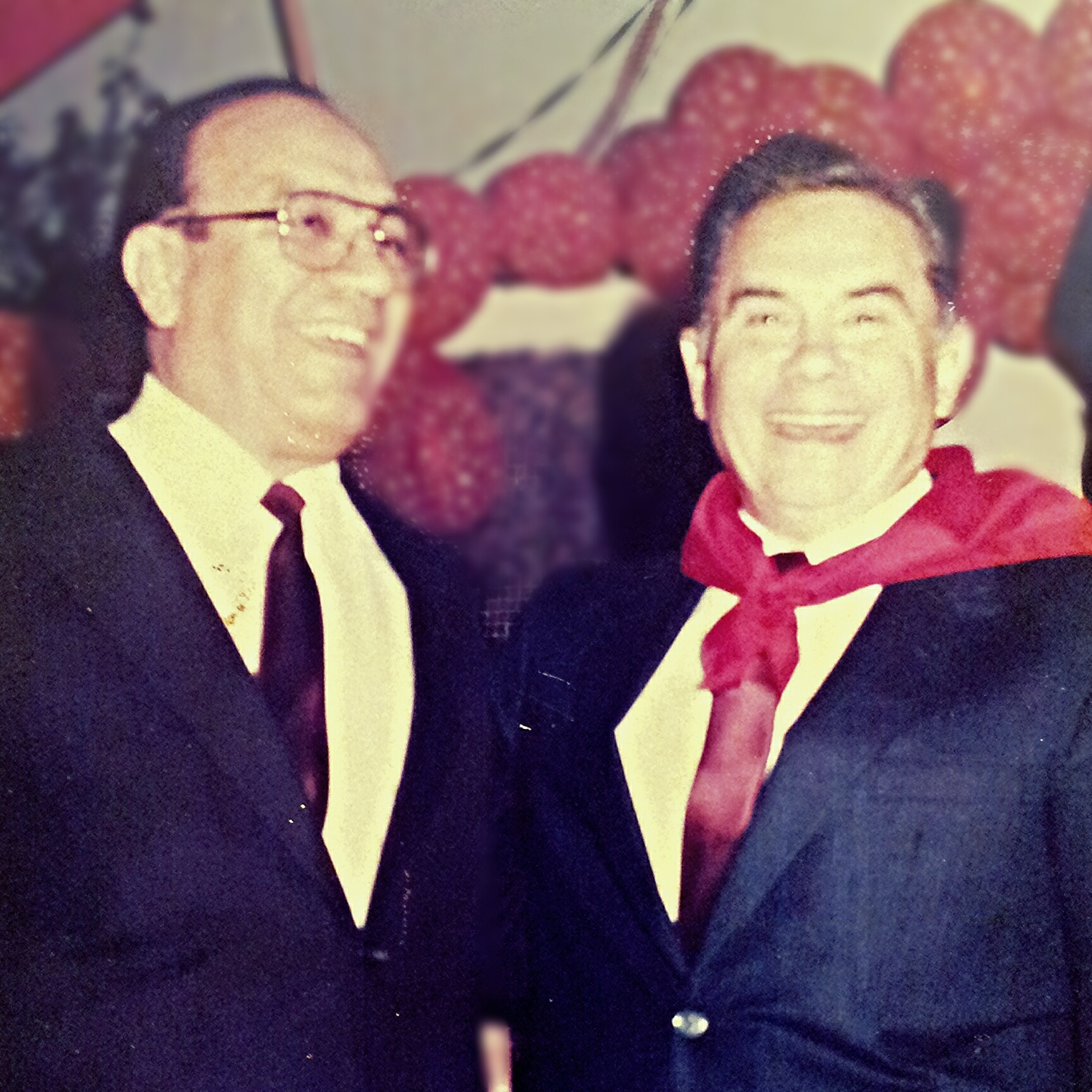
Argaña (right) with Genaro Sánchez on the anniversary of the founding of the Colorado Party in 1996.

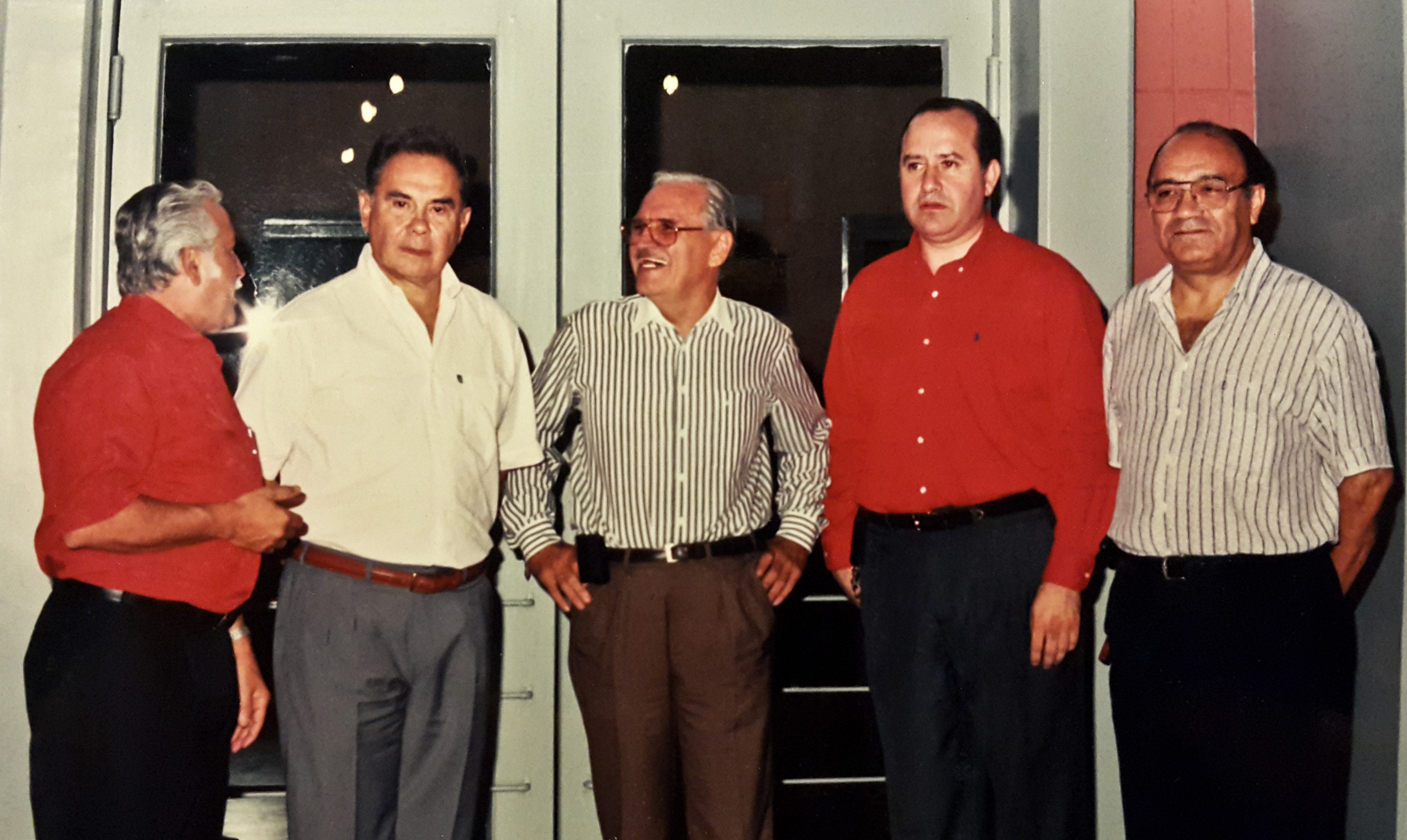
Argaña (second from left) with close members of his Reconciliación Colorada movement.

Despite his long identification with Stroessner, Argaña was a member of the "traditionalist" faction of the Colorados, which had come to favor a more humane way of ruling the country. Soon after stepping down from the Supreme Court, he accused Stroessner of running a police state, and claimed that "imposters" had taken over the party. He went on to say that those who persecuted defenseless women or attacked priests were not really Paraguayans, let alone Colorados. He soon emerged as the de facto leader of the traditionalist faction. Nonetheless, during the democratic era, Argaña was criticised for bringing Stroessner's era officials back to political life through his faction Colorado Reconciliation Movement, and during his bid to become the Colorado candidate for president in the 1993 elections, he publicly vowed that if elected, he would allow Stroessner to return from exile.

== 1993 election ==
Argaña ran a bid for the Colorado Party's nominee for president in the 1993 election. Although leading opinion polling at one point, he lost the Colorado Party primary to Juan Carlos Wasmosy who went on to win the 1993 general election. In January 2008, however, Paraguayan congressman Juan Carlos "Calé" Galaverna admitted to committing electoral fraud in the December 1992 Colorado primary elections to prevent Argaña from winning.

== 1998 election as vice-president ==
He tried again to obtain the party's presidential nomination for the 1998 election, losing in a bitterly contested primary election against General Lino Oviedo. Due to Oviedo's involvement in a failed coup attempt in 1996, Oviedo was imprisoned before the 1998 general election. Oviedo's running mate, Raúl Cubas, replaced Oviedo on the Colorado ticket, but lacked the widespread support that Oviedo commanded. Argaña was selected as Cubas' running mate, the pair subsequently being elected to office by a wide margin.

== Death ==
On March 23, 1999, Argaña was shot and killed by an armed group traveling in a car that intercepted the vehicle in which Argaña, his bodyguard and his driver were traveling. The assassins blocked the street, stopping Argaña's vehicle. They got out in an organized manner and shot repeatedly at the bodyguard, the driver and Argaña, who would die from multiple shots, in addition to his bodyguard. The driver survived the attack. The over-the-air television channel SNT showed the images exclusively.

=== Trial ===
On October 23, 1999, Pablo Vera Esteche was arrested in Paraguay. He said the murder, for which he and two other gunmen were paid a total of $300,000, was authorised by Cubas and Oviedo. Vera Esteche was sentenced to 20 years on October 24 (reduced to 18 years four years later). His accomplices were also jailed for lengthy sentences.

Party political offices
Preceded by	President of the Colorado Party	Succeeded by Blas Riquelme
Political offices
Preceded by Ángel Seifart	Vice President of Paraguay; 1998-1999	Succeeded by Julio César Franco
