= Lino Oviedo =

Ex-general and Paraguayan politician (1943–2013)

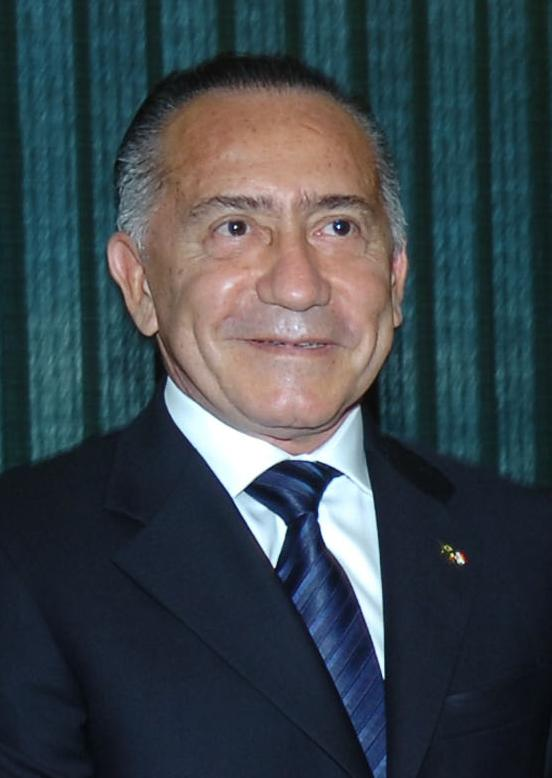

Personal details
- Born: 23 September 1943 Juan de Mena, Paraguay
- Died: 2 February 2013 (aged 69) Presidente Hayes, Paraguay
- Party: Colorado Party (–2002); National Union of Ethical Citizens (2002–2013)

Military service
- Branch/service: Army
- Years of service: ?–1996
- Rank: General

Lino César Oviedo Silva (23 September 1943 – 2 February 2013) was a Paraguayan army officer and politician, who was the leader of the National Union of Ethical Citizens, which split from the Colorado Party in 2002.

== Life and work ==
=== Early career ===
Oviedo was born in poverty in the town of Juan de Mena (Cordillera Department) on September 23, 1943. He chose a military career, studied in Germany and eventually became a close aide to General Andrés Rodríguez. He was named chief of the Army in 1993. When President Juan Carlos Wasmosy asked him to step down from that position in April 1996, he allegedly refused and attempted a coup d'etat. After days of tension, Wasmosy offered him the Defence Ministry instead, but when Oviedo went to the presidential palace to take the oath, dressed in civilian clothes, the President, backed by popular demonstrations, withdrew the offer.

Ousted from the military, he concentrated in winning the ruling Colorado Party's candidacy for the 1998 presidential elections, and succeeded by presenting a populist platform through his great rhetorical skills. A month before the national elections, and while leading the polls, he was finally condemned to a ten-year prison term for his 1996 military mutiny. His running mate Raúl Cubas continued the campaign and eventually won the elections, largely based on the promise to free Oviedo, which in fact he did days after taking office, over the protest of the Paraguayan Supreme Court and opposition leaders.

In March 1999, vice president Luis María Argaña, a key political enemy of both Oviedo and President Cubas, was assassinated. In the midst of riots and political turmoil known as Marzo paraguayo ("Paraguayan March"), Cubas resigned, abandoning Oviedo, who fled into exile, first in Argentina and then in Brazil.

=== Imprisonment and release (2004–2007) ===
On June 28, 2004, he returned to Paraguay and was detained by the police, who took him to the Military Prison of Viñas Cué, located a short distance from Asunción. Initially sentenced to a ten-year term, he was released on parole for good behavior on 6 September 2007.

In November 2006, a Paraguayan man, Tomás Velázquez, held a hunger strike before he crucified himself publicly as a protest in Asunción. He maintained that Oviedo was the target of political persecution and that the military tribunal that convicted him for his alleged participation in a subversive plot was illegal according to the constitution, as it had been conducted in time of peace.

On 30 October 2007, Oviedo's conviction was overturned by the Supreme Court in an eight to one decision following testimony from former officers that there had been no coup attempt. The ruling left Oviedo free to run in the April 2008 presidential election.

=== Later political career ===
In January 2008 he was nominated as the candidate of his party, the National Union of Ethical Citizens (UNACE), without opposition. He lost the 2008 Paraguayan presidential election, to Fernando Lugo getting 22.8% of votes.

Lino Oviedo's similarly-named nephew, Lino César Oviedo Sánchez, has been a member of the Senate of Paraguay for UNACE since 2008.

== Death ==
On the night of 2 February 2013, Lino Cesar Oviedo died in a helicopter accident near Puerto Antequera, in the Chaco region. He was flying back to Asunción after an electoral rally held in the city of Concepción. His death was confirmed the following day by a national police rescue team.
