= Luis González Macchi =

President of Paraguay from 1999 to 2003

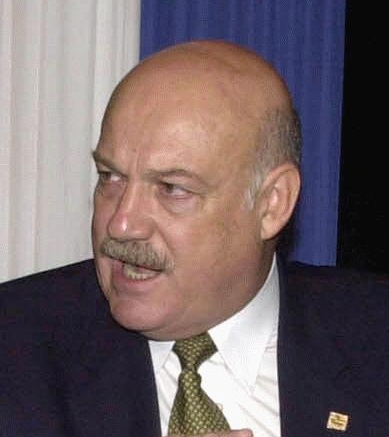
- González Macchi in 2003

46th President of Paraguay
- In office 28 March 1999 – 15 August 2003
- Vice President: Yoyito Franco (Note: Office vacant from March 1999 to September 2000 when Franco was appointed. Franco resigned in October 2002 to participate in the 2003 Paraguayan general election.)
- Preceded by: Raúl Cubas
- Succeeded by: Nicanor Duarte

64th President of the Senate
- In office 30 June 1998 – 28 March 1999
- Preceded by: Rodrigo Campos
- Succeeded by: Juan Carlos Galaverna

Senator of the Republic
- In office 30 June 1998 – 28 March 1999
- Constituency: National

Personal details
- Born: December 13, 1947 (age 78) Asunción, Paraguay
- Party: Colorado Party
- Spouse: Susana Galli Romañach

Luis Ángel González Macchi (born 13 December 1947) is a Paraguayan politician who served as the 46th President of Paraguay from 1999 to 2003. He was not elected to the presidency but rather assumed it after the assassination of Vice President Luis María Argaña and the subsequent resignation of President Raúl Cubas, as he was the President of the Senate of Paraguay at the time. A member of the Colorado Party, González Macchi served in both houses of the Paraguayan Congress before his presidency.

== Career ==
He was the President of the Paraguayan Senate from 1998 to 1999. As the president of the Senate, González Macchi was next in line for the presidency on March 23, 1999 following the assassination of Vice President Luis María Argaña. President Raúl Cubas was suspected of being involved in the assassination. This, combined with other scandals resulted in his impeachment by the Chamber of Deputies on March 24. Realizing that he faced almost certain conviction and removal by the Senate, Cubas resigned on March 29, and González Macchi ascended to the presidency.

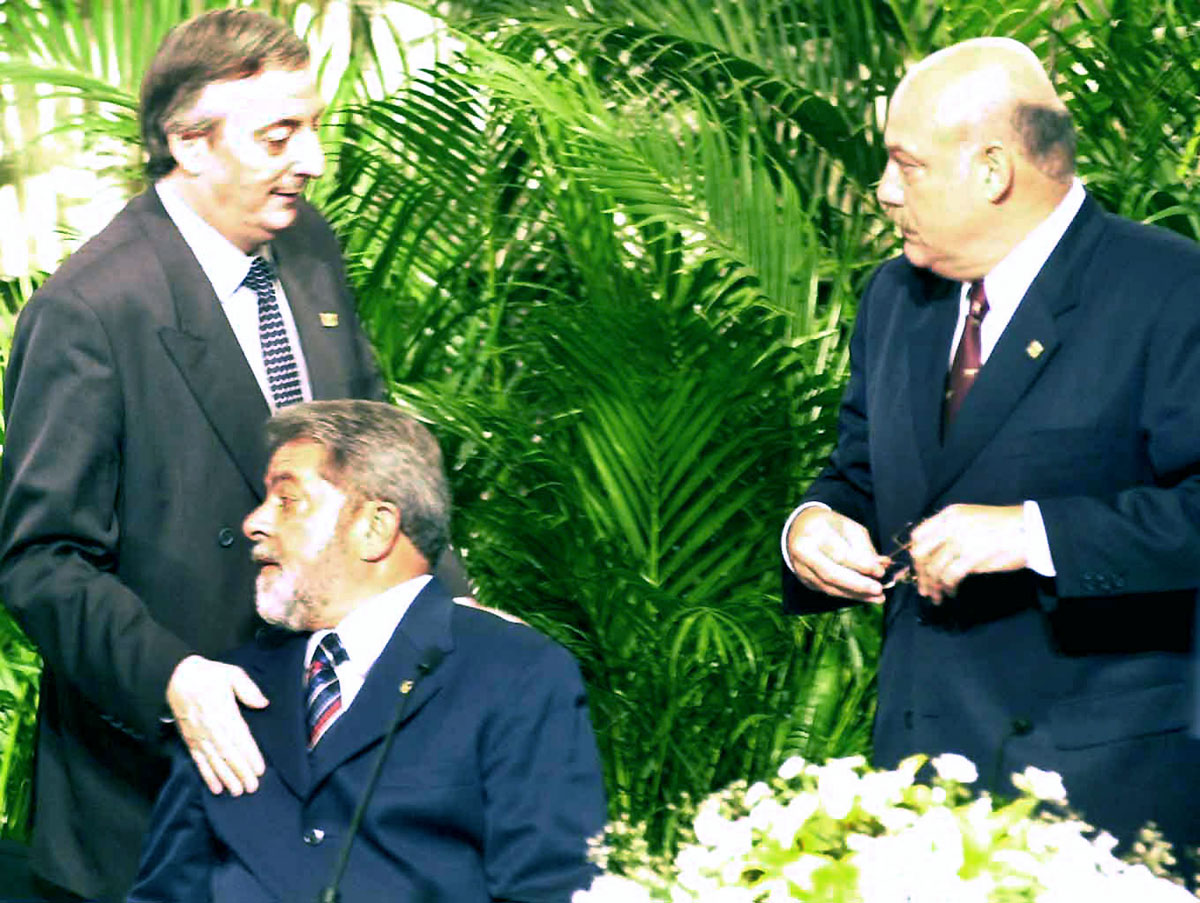
González Macchi (right) with Néstor Kirchner (left) and Lula da Silva (seated) in 2003

As president, González Macchi attempted to create a coalition government to spur cooperation within Paraguay and repair the economy which had been damaged by the political crisis. This coalition did not last long, as the Authentic Radical Liberal Party left it in 2000, leaving González Macchi without a majority in the legislature. González Macchi became ever more unpopular as the economy sagged further and found passing legislation difficult because few legislators would vote on bills that he pushed for. There was a coup attempt in 2000 and an impeachment attempt in 2001, though both failed. González Macchi was able to hold on to his presidency until the elections of 2003, which Nicanor Duarte won. He could not run for a full term in this election, as the Constitution bars any sort of reelection for a president even if he serves a partial term. He left office on August 15, 2003.

On December 4, 2006, González Macchi was sentenced to eight years in prison for fraud and embezzlement. The sentence was overturned on appeal.

== Notes ==
Political offices
| Preceded by Raúl Cubas | President of Paraguay; 1999–2003 | Succeeded by Nicanor Duarte |
