= Juan Carlos Wasmosy =

President of Paraguay from 1993 to 1998

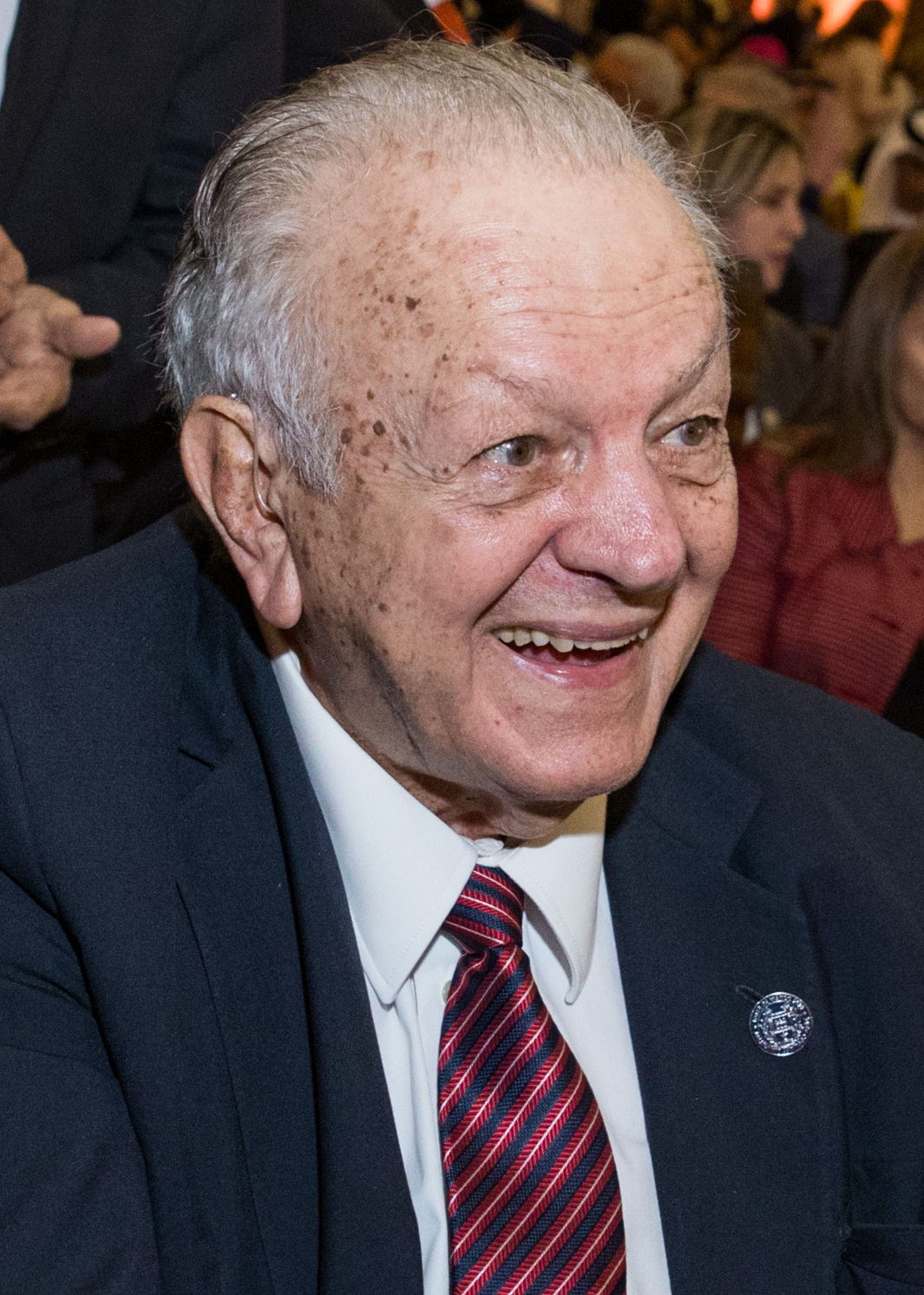
- Wasmosy in 2023

44th President of Paraguay
- In office 15 August 1993 – 15 August 1998
- Vice President: Ángel Roberto Seifart
- Preceded by: Andrés Rodríguez
- Succeeded by: Raúl Cubas Grau

Senator of the Republic
- Life Tenure
- Assumed office 15 August 1998 Serving with Mario Abdo Benítez
- Constituency: President of Paraguay

Personal details
- Born: December 15, 1938 (age 87) Asunción, Paraguay
- Party: Colorado Party (1960–2000)
- Spouse: María Teresa Carrasco
- Children: 5
- Parents: Juan Bautista Wasmosy; María Gregoria Monti Paoli
- Education: Universidad Nacional de Asunción
- Occupation: Politician
- Profession: Civil Engineer

Juan Carlos Wasmosy Monti (born December 15, 1938) is a Paraguayan former politician and engineer who was the 44th president of Paraguay from 1993 to 1998. He was a member of the Colorado Party, and the country's first freely elected president, as well as the first civilian president in 39 years.

== Biography ==
Born in Asunción, Wasmosy trained as a civil engineer and became head of the Paraguayan consortium working on the Itaipu Dam. During this project, he amassed a large amount of wealth. He served as minister of integration under President Andrés Rodríguez.

His ancestors, Dániel and József Vámosy, immigrated to South America from Debrecen, Hungary, in 1828. At that time, the surname of the family was Vámosy; it was Hispanicized to Wasmosy. His relative, Alceu Wamosy (1895–1923), a famous Brazilian writer, is also from this ancestry. Juan Carlos Wasmosy went to see the hometown of his ancestors in 1995 during his official visit to Hungary.

Rodríguez endorsed Wasmosy as his successor in the 1993 elections. He won with almost 42 percent of the vote, in what is generally acknowledged to be the first (largely) free and fair election in the country's history (the country had gained independence in 1811), with Domingo Laino finishing a close second. Although there were confirmed cases of fraud, a team of international observers led by Jimmy Carter concluded that Wasmosy's margin of victory was large enough to offset any wrongdoing. Carter also noted that opposition candidates took 60 percent of the vote between them. This was a remarkable figure given Paraguay's long history of autocratic rule. For most of the country's history, particularly during Alfredo Stroessner's 35-year dictatorship, the opposition was barely tolerated when it was even permitted at all. At the time of Stroessner's ouster in 1989, the country had only known two years of true democracy in its entire history.

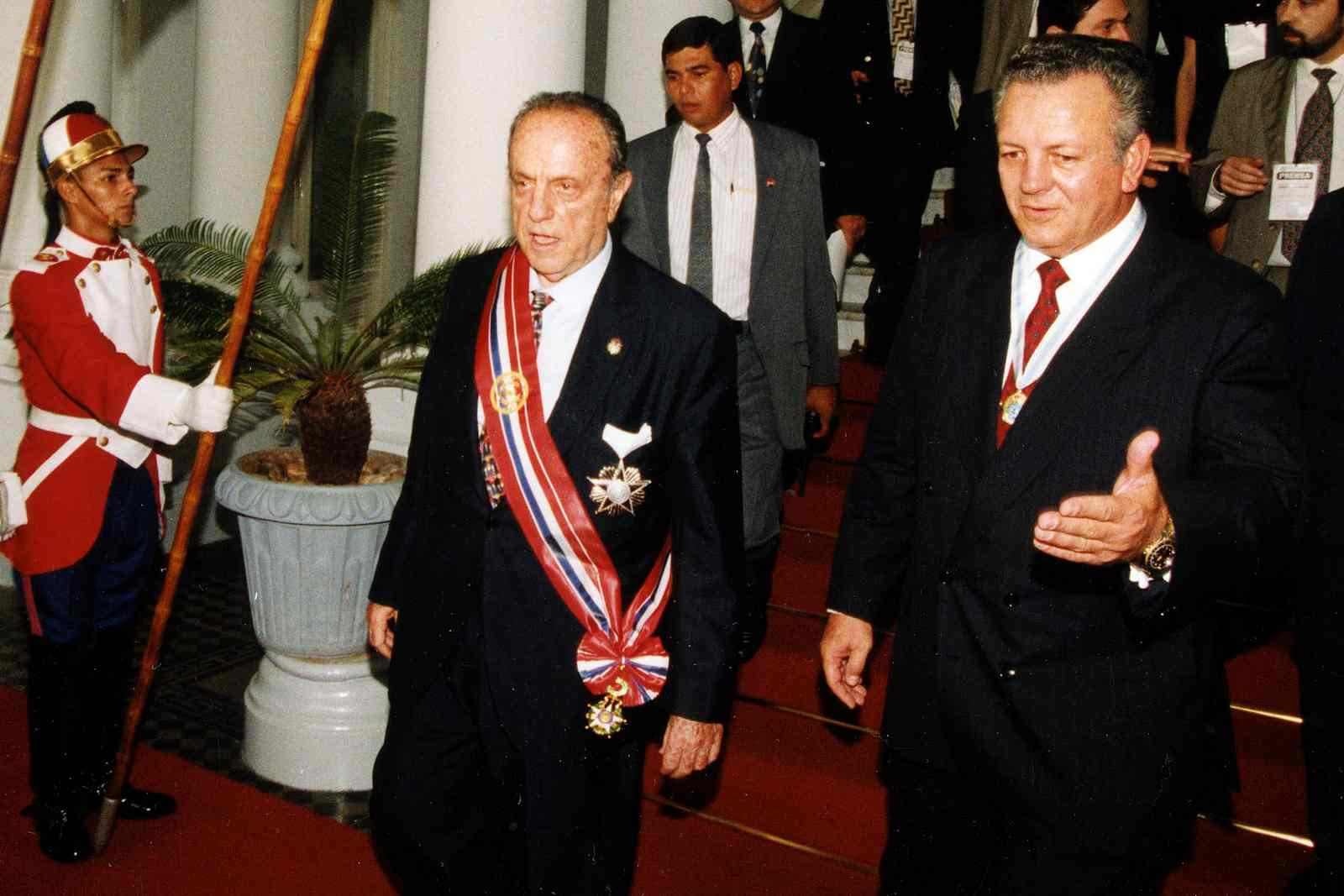
Wasmosy (right) receiving Manuel Fraga at the Palacio de los López in 1995.

However, he became very unpopular when he appointed many of Stroessner's supporters to government posts. He also failed to continue the limited reforms of Rodríguez. A principal obstacle was the factional nature of the party, which contributed to the stalling of many of his priorities. He was a solid conservative who approved market-oriented policies. He oversaw the privatization of the national airline, merchant fleet, and steel company.

Lino Oviedo, head of the Paraguayan army, allegedly attempted a coup in April 1996. Wasmosy countered by offering Oviedo a ministerial position, but soon imprisoned him. When he made the offer to Oviedo, many Paraguayans accused him of undermining the civilian government and organized massive demonstrations in the capital.

Wasmosy was barred from running again in 1998; in response to Stroessner's authoritarian excesses, the 1992 constitution barred any sort of reelection for the president. Raúl Cubas stood for the Colorado Party presidential nomination and won.

In 2002, Wasmosy was convicted of defrauding the Paraguayan state and was himself sentenced to four years in prison. The sentence was later appealed. Upon appeal, his sentence was reduced to bail and house arrest. As a former president of Paraguay, he was made a senator for life.

Political offices
Preceded by Andrés Rodríguez	President of Paraguay; August 15, 1993 – August 15, 1998	Succeeded by Raúl Cubas
