= Sonia Brucke =

Paraguayan civil servant

Sonia Brucke Romero is a Paraguayan civil servant. Since 2006 she has served the Senate of Paraguay as Director of the Commission for Equality, Gender and Social Development.

Brucke was Planning Director at the Women's Secretariat (Secretaría de la Mujer de la Presidencia de la República, SMPR). She helped create Paraguay's Ministry for Women.

== Works ==
- (with Allison Petrozziello, Jessica Menon and Marcia Greenberg) USAID/Paraguay Gender Assessment, USAID, 2011
