= Paraguayan passport =

Passport

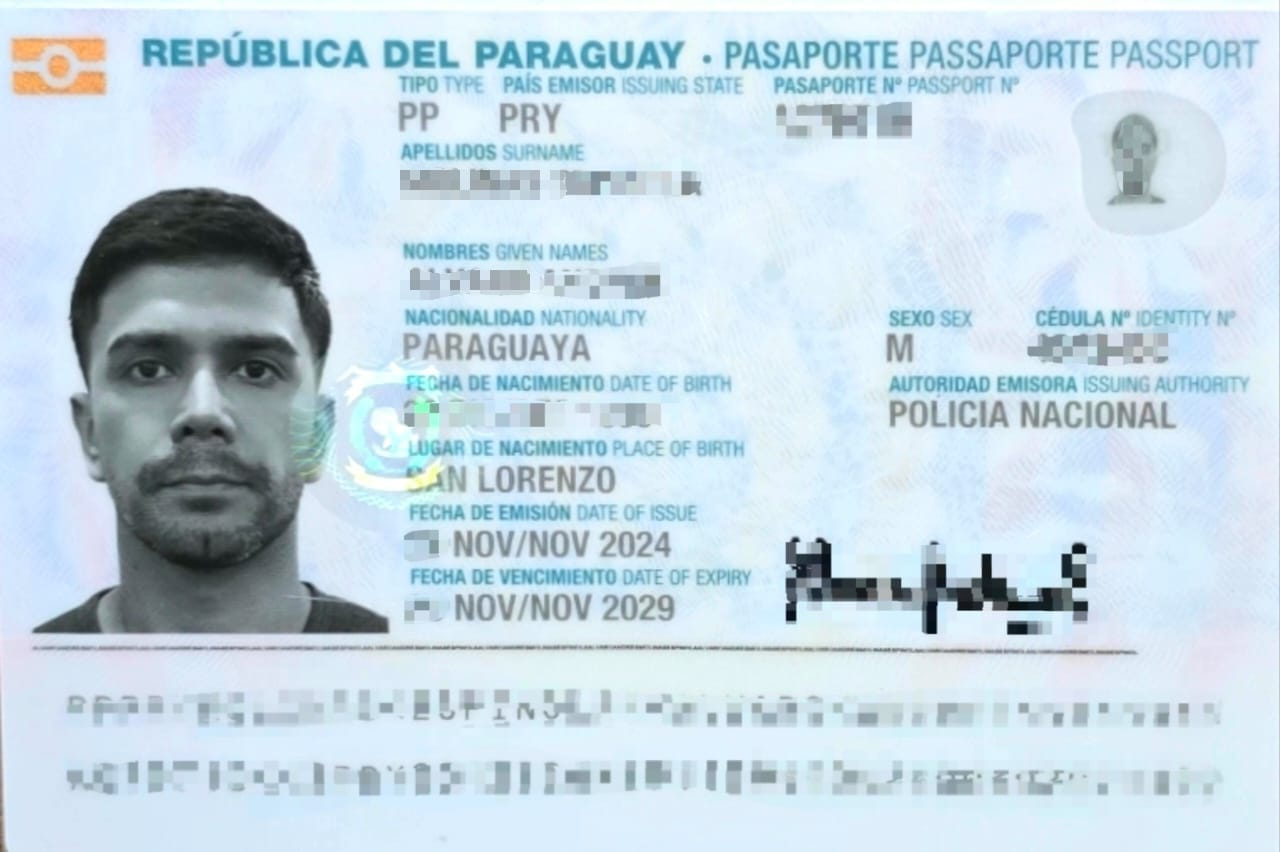
- Biodata page of the current Paraguayan passport, issued in 2023
- Type: Passport
- Issued by: Paraguay
- Purpose: Identification
- Eligibility: Paraguayan citizenship

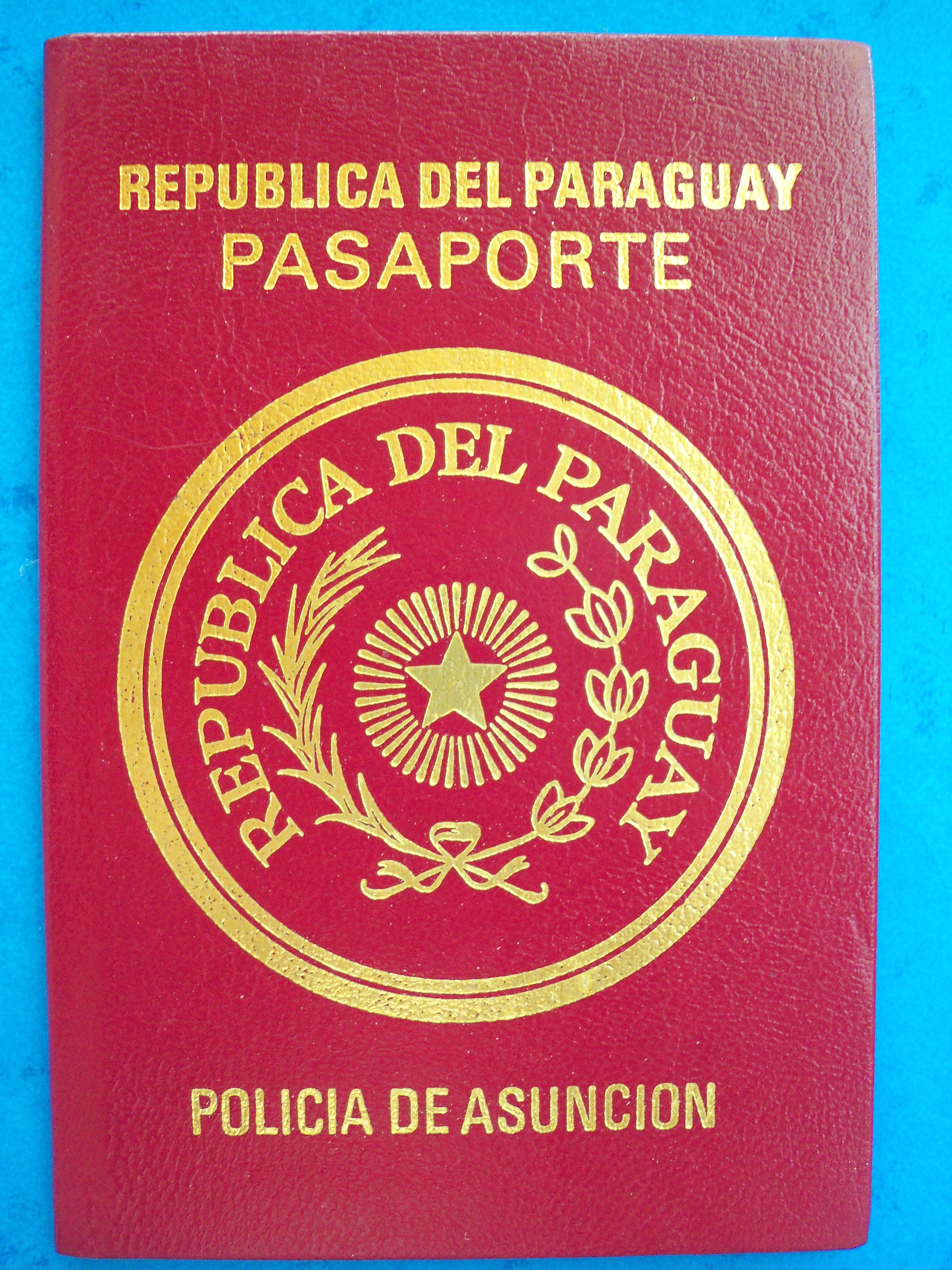
1989 Paraguayan passport, Pre-Mercosur

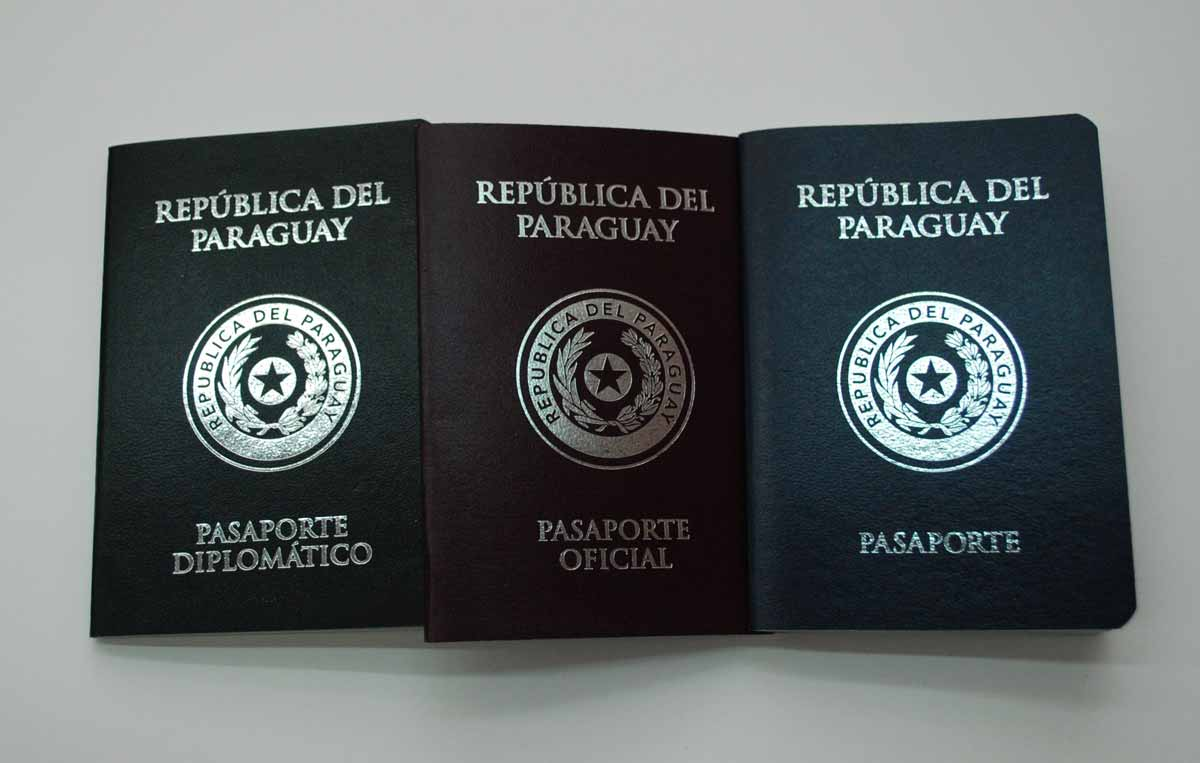
Diplomatic, official, and consular Paraguayan passports

Pre-biometric passport

Paraguayan passports are issued to Paraguayan citizens for travel outside of Paraguay. For traveling to full and associated member states of Mercosur (except for Guyana and Suriname), Paraguayan citizens can also use their civil identity cards (Cédula de Identidad Civil).

Paraguayan passports are valid for travel to all countries, although travel to certain countries may require visas. The Paraguayan passport meets the recommended standards (size, composition, layout, technology) of the International Civil Aviation Organization (ICAO) established by Exhibit 9303.2 3 4 5 6.

There are three types of passports and the Paraguayan government has been issuing biometric passports as standard since April 1, 2010.

Paraguayan consular passports can be issued to Paraguayan citizens living abroad. Consular passports are printed at the headquarters of the Ministry of Foreign Affairs in Asunción and are then delivered to the embassy or consulate concerned. Consular passports are valid for a period of five years and are not renewable.

== Types of passports ==
Paraguayan passports are classified into three types:

Ordinary Passports (Police or Consular) - Issued for ordinary travel, such as holiday and business travel.

Diplomatic Passports - Issued to Paraguayan diplomats, senior officials of the Paraguayan government, and diplomatic couriers.

Official Passports - Issued to individual representatives of the Paraguayan government on official business.

== Status of the Paraguayan passport ==
A Paraguayan passport is required for travel to every country in the world, except for travel to full and associated member states of Mercosur (except for Guyana and Suriname). Paraguayan citizens traveling to those countries need only a civil identity card (Cédula de Identidad Civil).

Paraguayan nationals, as a former colony of Spain, are entitled, in a facilitated and expeditious manner, to obtain permanent residence permits in Spain.

Naturalized Paraguayans will see their passports list their nationality as "naturalized Paraguayan" instead of just "Paraguayan".

== Passport regulations ==
Paraguayan consular passports may be issued by Paraguayan diplomatic missions or consular offices to Paraguayan nationals living abroad, in accordance with Resolution 924/13 (MRE. Res. Nº 924, 3 September 2013).

To apply for a Paraguayan consular passport, Paraguayan nationals must meet the following requirements:

- Be a natural or naturalized Paraguayan.
- Possess a Paraguayan civil identity card, or a copy of it, or an expired passport or other suitable document that proves the applicant's identity.
- Fill out and sign the application form.
- Be a resident in the jurisdiction of the diplomatic and/or consular representation.
- Personally appear at the headquarters of the diplomatic and/or consular representation (excusable in duly justified cases).
- Not have a police record.
- Pay the corresponding consular fee.

== See also ==
- List of passports
- Visa requirements for Paraguayan citizens
