= Visa requirements for Paraguayan citizens =

Administrative entry restrictions

Visa requirements for Paraguayan citizens are administrative entry restrictions imposed by the authorities of foreign states on citizens of Paraguay.

As of 2026, Paraguayan citizens had visa-free or visa on arrival access to 146 countries and territories, ranking the Paraguayan passport 26th of the world according to the Henley Passport Index.

In order to travel to another country, Paraguayan citizens require a passport, except for travel to full and associated member states of Mercosur (except for Guyana and Suriname) where a civil identity card (Cédula de Identidad Civil) suffices.

== Visa requirements map ==
Visa requirements for Paraguay citizens Paraguay ID card travel Visa not required Visa on arrival eVisa Visa available both on arrival or online Visa required

== Visa requirements ==
Visa requirements for holders of normal passports travelling for tourist purposes:

Paraguay is a full member of Mercosur. As such, its citizens enjoy unlimited access to any of the other full members (Argentina, Brazil and Uruguay) and the associated members of Bolivia, Chile, Colombia, Ecuador and Peru with the right to residence and work, with no requirement other than nationality.

Citizens of these nine countries (including Paraguay) may apply for the grant of temporary residence for up to two years in another country of the bloc. Then, they may apply for permanent residence just before the term of their temporary residence expires.

| Country | Visa requirement | Allowed stay | Notes (excluding departure fees) |
|---|---|---|---|
| Afghanistan | eVisa | 30 days | Visa is not required in case born in Afghanistan or can proof that one of their parents is a national of Afghanistan or born in Afghanistan.; e-Visa : Visitors must arrive at Kabul International (KBL). |
| Albania | Visa not required | 90 days | |
| Algeria | Visa required | | |
| Andorra | Visa not required | | |
| Angola | eVisa | | |
| Antigua and Barbuda | eVisa | | |
| Argentina | Visa not required | 3 months | Entry is allowed with a valid Paraguayan identity card that is less than 10 years old.; Paraguayans can live and work legally in Argentina under the Mercosur (and Associated Members) immigration agreement with no requirement other than being a citizen at birth or a naturalized citizen for over 5 years, and passing a background check. |
| Armenia | eVisa | 120 days | Paraguayan citizens can get a visa on arrival if they have a valid residence permit or valid visa issued by the EU and Schengen member states, the USA, Australia, New Zealand, the Republic of Korea, the UK, Canada, the Russian Federation, or Japan or a valid residence permit issued by one of the GCC member states. |
| Australia | Visa required | | May apply online (Online Visitor e600 visa). |
| Austria | Visa not required | 90 days | 90 days within any 180 day period in the Schengen Area. |
| Azerbaijan | eVisa | 30 days | |
| Bahamas | Visa not required | 3 months | |
| Bahrain | eVisa / Visa on arrival | 14 days | |
| Bangladesh | Visa required | | |
| Barbados | Visa not required | 90 days | |
| Belarus | eVisa / Visa on arrival | | Entry with an e-visa is possible through all international checkpoints. |
| Belgium | Visa not required | 90 days | 90 days within any 180 day period in the Schengen Area. |
| Belize | Visa not required | 90 days | |
| Benin | eVisa | 30 days | Must have an international vaccination certificate. |
| Bhutan | eVisa | | Must pay 100 USD per person per day for Sustainable Development Fee |
| Bolivia | Visa not required | 90 days | Entry is allowed with a valid Paraguayan identity card that is less than 10 years old.; Paraguayans can live and work legally in Bolivia under the Mercosur (and Associated Members) immigration agreement with no requirement other than being a citizen at birth or a naturalized citizen for over 5 years, and passing a background check. |
| Bosnia and Herzegovina | Visa not required | 90 days | 90 days within any 180 day period. |
| Botswana | Visa not required | 90 days | 90 days within any 180 day period. |
| Brazil | Visa not required | 90 days | Entry is allowed with a valid Paraguayan identity card that is less than 10 years old.; Paraguayans can live and work legally in Brazil under the Mercosur (and Associated Members) immigration agreement with no requirement other than being a citizen at birth or a naturalized citizen for over five years, and passing a background check. |
| Brunei | Visa required | | |
| Bulgaria | Visa not required | 90 days | 90 days within any 180 day period in the Schengen Area. |
| Burkina Faso | eVisa / Visa on arrival | 1 month | |
| Burundi | Visa on arrival | 1 month | |
| Cambodia | eVisa / Visa on arrival | 30 days | |
| Cameroon | eVisa | | |
| Canada | Visa required | | US permanent residents (Green card) holders can enter visa free |
| Cape Verde | Visa on arrival | | Not available at all entry points. |
| Central African Republic | Visa required | | |
| Chad | eVisa | | |
| Chile | Visa not required | 90 days | Entry is allowed with a valid Paraguayan identity card that is less than 10 years old.; Paraguayans can live and work legally in Chile under the Mercosur (and Associated Members) immigration agreement with no requirement other than being a citizen at birth or a naturalized citizen for over 5 years, and passing a background check.| |
| China | Visa required | | |
| Colombia | Visa not required | 90 days | Extendable up to 180-days stay within a one-year period.; Entry is allowed with a valid Paraguayan identity card that is less than 10 years old.; Paraguayans can live and work legally in Colombia under the Mercosur (and Associated Members) immigration agreement with no requirement other than being a citizen at birth or a naturalized citizen for over 5 years, and passing a background check. |
| Comoros | Visa on arrival | 45 days | |
| Republic of the Congo | Visa required | | |
| Democratic Republic of the Congo | eVisa | 7 days | |
| Costa Rica | Visa not required | 90 days | |
| Côte d'Ivoire | eVisa | 3 months | e-Visa holders must arrive via Port Bouet Airport. |
| Croatia | Visa not required | 90 days | 90 days within any 180 day period in the Schengen Area. |
| Cuba | eVisa | 90 days | Can be extended up to 90 days with a fee. |
| Cyprus | Visa not required | 90 days | 90 days within any 180 day period |
| Czech Republic | Visa not required | 90 days | 90 days within any 180 day period in the Schengen Area |
| Denmark | Visa not required | 90 days | 90 days within any 180 day period in the Schengen Area |
| Djibouti | eVisa | 90 days | |
| Dominica | Visa not required | 21 days | |
| Dominican Republic | Visa not required | 30 days | Can be extended up to 120 days with fee |
| Ecuador | Visa not required | 90 days | Entry is allowed with a valid Paraguayan identity card that is less than 10 years old.; Paraguayans can live and work legally in Ecuador under the Mercosur (and Associated Members) immigration agreement with no requirement other than being a citizen at birth or a naturalized citizen for over 5 years, and passing a background check. |
| Egypt | eVisa/Visa on arrival | 30 days | |
| El Salvador | Visa not required | 180 days | |
| Equatorial Guinea | eVisa | | Must arrive via Malabo International Airport, processing fee 75 USD |
| Eritrea | Visa required | | |
| Estonia | Visa not required | 90 days | 90 days within any 180 day period in the Schengen Area. |
| Eswatini | Visa required | 30 days | |
| Ethiopia | eVisa | up to 90 days | e-Visa holders must arrive via Addis Ababa Bole International Airport |
| Fiji | Visa not required | 4 months | |
| Finland | Visa not required | 90 days | 90 days within any 180 day period in the Schengen Area |
| France and territories | Visa not required | 90 days | 90 days within any 180 day period in the Schengen Area |
| Gabon | eVisa | 90 days | e-Visa holders must arrive via Libreville International Airport. |
| Gambia | Visa required | | |
| Georgia | Visa not required | 90 days | 90 days within 180 days |
| Germany | Visa not required | 90 days | 90 days within any 180 day period in the Schengen Area |
| Ghana | Visa required | | |
| Greece | Visa not required | 90 days | 90 days within any 180 day period in the Schengen Area |
| Grenada | Visa required | | |
| Guatemala | Visa not required | 90 days | |
| Guinea | eVisa | 90 days | |
| Guinea-Bissau | Visa on arrival | 90 days | |
| Guyana | eVisa | | |
| Haiti | Visa not required | 3 months | |
| Honduras | Visa not required | 90 days | |
| Hungary | Visa not required | 90 days | 90 days within any 180 day period in the Schengen Area |
| Iceland | Visa not required | 90 days | 90 days within any 180 day period in the Schengen Area |
| India | eVisa | 30 days | e-Visa holders must arrive via 32 designated airports (Note: Ahmedabad; Amritsar; Bagdogra; Bengaluru; Bhubaneswar; Chandigarh; Chennai; Coimbatore; Delhi; Gaya; Goa-Dabolim; Goa-Manohar; Guwahati; Hyderabad; Indore; Jaipur; Kannur; Kochi; Kolkata; Kozhikode; Lucknow; Madurai; Mangaluru; Mumbai; Nagpur; Port Blair; Pune; Surat; Thiruvananthapuram; Tiruchirappalli; Varanasi; Visakhapatnam) or 5 designated seaports. (Note: Chennai; Cochin; Mormugao (Goa); Mumbai; Mangalore); An Indian e-Tourist Visa may only be obtained twice within 1 calendar year.; Foreigners of Pakistani origin or who hold a Pakistani Passport are not eligible for an e-Visa. Foreigners who are not Pakistani nationals, but whose parents or grandparents (either paternal or maternal) were born in, or were permanent residents in Pakistan, are also not eligible for an e-Visa. |
| Indonesia | eVisa | | |
| Iran | eVisa/Visa on arrival | 30 days | |
| Iraq | eVisa | | |
| Ireland | Visa not required | 90 days | |
| Israel | Electronic Travel Authorization | 3 months | |
| Italy | Visa not required | 90 days | 90 days within any 180 day period in the Schengen Area. |
| Jamaica | Visa not required | 30 days | |
| Japan | Visa Not required | 90 days | From June 1, 2025.; Eligible for an e-Visa if residing in one these countries Australia, Brazil, Cambodia, Canada, India, Saudi Arabia, Singapore, South Africa, Taiwan, United Arab Emirates, United Kingdom, United States.; May apply online |
| Jordan | eVisa / Visa on arrival | 30 days | Visa can be obtained upon arrival, it will cost a total of 40 JOD, obtainable at most international ports of entry and land border crossings. (except King Hussein/Allenby Bridge) |
| Kazakhstan | eVisa | | |
| Kenya | Electronic Travel Authorisation | 90 days | Applications can be submitted up to 90 days prior to travel and must be submitted at least 3 days in advance.; eTA fee is 32.50 USD.; Proof of reservation at the hotel where visitors plan to stay is required (if staying with friends, an invitation letter is also acceptable).; Yellow fever vaccination certificate is required if coming from endemic countries. |
| Kiribati | Visa not required | 90 days | 90 days within any 12-month period. |
| North Korea | Visa required | | |
| South Korea | Electronic Travel Authorization | 30 days | The validity period of a K-ETA is 3 years from the date of approval. |
| Kuwait | Visa required | | e-Visa can be obtained for holders of a Residence Permit issued by a GCC member state under the following conditions: To be 18 years old and over.; The residence permit for a GCC state must be valid for at least another 3 months.; To be accompanied by the sponsor of the residence permit if the sponsor is an individual.; Does not apply to holders of a GCC Student Visa and Non-Skilled Worker Visa |
| Kyrgyzstan | eVisa | 60 days | e-Visa holders must arrive via Manas International Airport or Osh Airport or through land crossings with China (at Irkeshtam and Torugart), Kazakhstan (at Ak-jol, Ak-Tilek, Chaldybar, Chon-Kapka), Tajikistan (at Bor-Dobo, Kulundu, Kyzyl-Bel) and Uzbekistan (at Dostuk). |
| Laos | eVisa / Visa on arrival | 30 days | 18 (Note: Savannakhet Airport; Lanetoui - Mengkang (China); Meuangmom - Wan Pong (Myanmar); Banvang - Ban Khok Phai (Thailand); Namngeun - Huay Kon (Thailand); Paksan - Bueng Kan (Thailand); Paktaphan - Pak Saeng (Thailand); Pangmon - Ban Huak (Thailand); Phoudou (Thailand); Dak ta ock - Nam Giang (Vietnam); La Lai (Vietnam); Namkan (Vietnam); Namphao - Cau Treo (Vietnam); Namsoy - Na Meo (Vietnam); Naphao - Cha Lo (Vietnam); Pahang - Long Sap (Vietnam); Panghok - Tây Trang (Vietnam); Phoukeua - Bo Y (Vietnam)) of the 33 border crossings are only open to regular visa holders.; e-Visa may be used to enter Laos through the Luang Prabang, Pakse and Vientiane international airports, 3 Thai-Lao Friendship Bridges (Note: Vientiane (Friendship Bridge 1); Savannakhet (Friendship Bridge 2); Bokeo (Friendship Bridge 4)), in Boten (road and railroad), and in Vientiane (at Khamsavath railway station).; Visa on arrival is available at the Luang Prabang, Pakse and Vientiane international airports, 4 Thai-Lao Friendship Bridges (Note: Vientiane (Friendship Bridge 1); Savannakhet (Friendship Bridge 2); Khammouane (Friendship Bridge 3); Bokeo (Friendship Bridge 4)) and 7 border crossings. (Note: Nongnokkheane - Trapeang Kriel (Cambodia); Boten - Bo han (China); Golden Triangle/Samliemkham (Thailand); Khamsavath railway station (Thailand); Namheuang - Ban Na Kraseng (Thailand); Vang tao - Chongmek (Thailand); Dansavan - Lao Bảo (Vietnam)) |
| Latvia | Visa not required | 90 days | 90 days within any 180 day period in the Schengen Area. |
| Lebanon | Free visa on arrival | 1 month | |
| Lesotho | eVisa | 14 days | eVisa currently suspended |
| Liberia | eVisa | | |
| Libya | eVisa | | |
| Liechtenstein | Visa not required | 90 days | 90 days within any 180 day period in the Schengen Area |
| Lithuania | Visa not required | 90 days | 90 days within any 180 day period in the Schengen Area |
| Luxembourg | Visa not required | 90 days | 90 days within any 180 day period in the Schengen Area |
| Madagascar | eVisa / Visa on arrival | 90 days | |
| Malawi | eVisa / Visa on arrival | 90 days | Can extend for a total of 90 days. |
| Malaysia | Visa not required | 30 days | |
| Maldives | Free visa on arrival | 30 days | |
| Mali | Visa required | | |
| Malta | Visa not required | 90 days | 90 days within any 180 day period in the Schengen Area. |
| Marshall Islands | Visa on arrival | 90 days | |
| Mauritania | eVisa | | |
| Mauritius | Visa not required | 180 days | 180 days per calendar year for tourism, 120 days per calendar year for business |
| Mexico | Visa not required | 180 days | |
| Micronesia | Visa not required | 30 days | |
| Moldova | Visa not required | 90 days | 90 days within any 180 day period. |
| Monaco | Visa not required | | |
| Mongolia | Visa not required | 90 days | |
| Montenegro | Visa not required | 90 days | |
| Morocco | Visa required | | May apply for an e-Visa if holding a valid visa or a residency document issued by one of the following countries: Schengen Area, Australia, Canada, Ireland, New Zealand, United Kingdom, United States a residency document issued by Cyprus, Japan, United Arab Emirates. |
| Mozambique | eVisa / Visa on arrival | 30 days | |
| Myanmar | Visa required | | |
| Namibia | eVisa/Visa on arrival | 3 months | Available at Hosea Kutako International Airport, Kalahari Border Crossing and Walvis Bay Airport. |
| Nauru | Visa required | | |
| Nepal | Online Visa / Visa on arrival | 90 days | |
| Netherlands | Visa not required | 90 days | 90 days within any 180 day period in the Schengen Area. |
| New Zealand | Visa required | | May transit without visa if transit is through Auckland Airport and for no longer than 24 hours, subject to meeting character requirements and obtaining an Electronic Travel Authority prior to departure.; Holders of an Australian Permanent Resident Visa or Resident Return Visa may be granted a New Zealand Resident Visa on arrival permitting indefinite stay (pursuant to the Trans-Tasman Travel Arrangement), subject to meeting character requirements and obtaining an Electronic Travel Authority prior to departure. |
| Nicaragua | Visa not required | 90 days | |
| Niger | Visa required | | |
| Nigeria | eVisa | 90 days | |
| North Macedonia | Visa not required | 90 days | |
| Norway | Visa not required | 90 days | 90 days within any 180 day period in the Schengen Area. |
| Oman | Visa not required / eVisa | 14 days / 30 days | |
| Pakistan | Online Visa | 90 days | Free of charge |
| Palau | Free visa on arrival | 30 days | |
| Panama | Visa not required | 180 days | |
| Papua New Guinea | Easy Visitor Permit | 60 days | Visitors may apply for a visa online under the "Tourist - Own Itinerary" category. |
| Peru | Visa not required | 90 days | Entry is allowed with a valid Paraguayan identity card that is less than 10 years old.; Paraguayans can live and work legally in Peru under the Mercosur (and Associated Members) immigration agreement with no requirement other than being a citizen at birth or a naturalized citizen for over 5 years, and passing a background check. |
| Philippines | Visa not required | 30 days | |
| Poland | Visa not required | 90 days | 90 days within any 180 day period in the Schengen Area. |
| Portugal | Visa not required | 90 days | 90 days within any 180 day period in the Schengen Area. |
| Qatar | Visa not required | 30 days | |
| Romania | Visa not required | 90 days | 90 days within any 180 day period in the Schengen Area. |
| Russia | Visa not required | 90 days | 90 days within any 180 day period. |
| Rwanda | eVisa / Visa on arrival | 30 days | |
| Saint Kitts and Nevis | Electronic Travel Authorisation | 3 months | |
| Saint Lucia | Visa on arrival | 6 weeks | |
| Saint Vincent and the Grenadines | Visa not required | 3 months | |
| Samoa | Free entry permit on arrival | 60 days | |
| San Marino | Visa not required | | |
| São Tomé and Príncipe | eVisa | 15 days | |
| Saudi Arabia | Visa required | | |
| Senegal | Visa required | | |
| Serbia | Visa not required | 30 days | 30 days within any year period. |
| Seychelles | Electronic Border System | 3 months | Application can be submitted up to 30 days before travel.; Visitors must upload a reservation confirmation(s) for each visitor's location of stay in Seychelles.; Yellow fever vaccination certificate is required if coming from endemic countries.; Payment of the fee (EUR 10) by credit or debit card.; Valid for one journey only and it expires once exit the country. |
| Sierra Leone | eVisa | 3 months | |
| Singapore | Visa not required | 30 days | |
| Slovakia | Visa not required | 90 days | 90 days within any 180 day period in the Schengen Area |
| Slovenia | Visa not required | 90 days | 90 days within any 180 day period in the Schengen Area |
| Solomon Islands | Visa required | | |
| Somalia | eVisa | 30 days | All visitors must have an approved Electronic Visa (eTAS) before the start of their journey. |
| South Africa | Visa not required | 90 days | |
| South Sudan | eVisa | | Obtainable online.; Printed visa authorization must be presented at the time of travel. |
| Spain | Visa not required | 90 days | 90 days within any 180 day period in the Schengen Area. |
| Sri Lanka | eVisa / Visa on arrival | 60 days / 30 days | Sri Lanka introduced an ETA valid for 30 days. |
| Sudan | Visa required | | |
| Suriname | Visa not required | 90 days | An entrance fee of USD 50 or EUR 50 must be paid online prior to arrival.; Multiple entry e-Visa is also available. |
| Sweden | Visa not required | 90 days | 90 days within any 180 day period in the Schengen Area. |
| Switzerland | Visa not required | 90 days | 90 days within any 180 day period in the Schengen Area. |
| Syria | eVisa | | |
| Tajikistan | eVisa | 60 days | |
| Tanzania | eVisa / Visa on arrival | 90 days | |
| Thailand | eVisa / Visa on arrival | 60 days / 15 days | |
| Timor-Leste | Visa on arrival | 30 days | Not available at all entry points. |
| Togo | eVisa | 15 days | |
| Tonga | Visa required | | |
| Trinidad and Tobago | Visa not required | 90 days | |
| Tunisia | Visa required | | |
| Turkey | Visa not required | 90 days | |
| Turkmenistan | Visa required | | |
| Tuvalu | Visa on arrival | 1 month | |
| Uganda | eVisa | 3 months | |
| Ukraine | Visa not required | 90 days | 90 days within any 180 day period . |
| United Arab Emirates | Visa not required | 90 days | |
| United Kingdom | Electronic Travel Authorisation | 6 months | |
| United States | Visa required | | |
| Uruguay | Visa not required | 90 days | Entry is allowed with a valid Paraguayan identity card that is less than 10 years old.; Paraguayans can live and work legally in Uruguay under the Mercosur (and Associated Members) immigration agreement with no requirement other than being a citizen at birth or a naturalized citizen for over five years, and passing a background check. |
| Uzbekistan | eVisa | 30 days | |
| Vanuatu | eVisa | | |
| Vatican City | Visa not required | | |
| Venezuela | eVisa | | |
| Vietnam | eVisa | 90 days | Phú Quốc without a visa for up to 30 days. |
| Yemen | Visa required | | |
| Zambia | eVisa / Visa on arrival | 90 days | |
| Zimbabwe | eVisa / Visa on arrival | 30 days | |

== Territories and disputed areas ==
Visa requirements for Paraguayan citizens for visits to various territories, disputed areas and restricted zones:

| Visitor to | Visa requirement | Notes (excluding departure fees) |
|---|---|---|
| Abkhazia | Visa required | |
| (Argentina) (Misiones Province) Isla Apipé and Isla del medio | Special permit required | Permit required |
| Kosovo | Visa not required | 90 days |
| Sahrawi Arab Democratic Republic | Unclear | Undefined visa regime in the Western Sahara controlled territory. |
| Taiwan | Visa not required | 90 days |

== Dependent and autonomous territories ==
| Countries | Conditions of access | Notes |
United Kingdom
| Anguilla | Visa not required | 3 months |
| Bermuda | Visa not required | 6 months |
| British Virgin Islands | Visa not required | 1 month |
| Cayman Islands | Visa required | |
| Falkland Islands | Visa required | |
| Gibraltar | Visa not required | 6 months |
| Guernsey | Visa not required | 6 months |
| Isle of Man | Visa not required | 6 months |
| Jersey | Visa not required | 6 months |
| Montserrat | visa not required | 6 months |
| Saint Helena | Visa not required | 183 days |
China
| Hong Kong | Visa not required | 30 days |
| Macau | Visa on arrival | 30 days |
Denmark
| Faroe Islands | Visa not required | 90 days |
| Greenland | Visa not required | 90 days |
Netherlands
| Aruba | Visa not required | 90 days |
| Caribbean Netherlands (includes Bonaire, Sint Eustatius and Saba) | Visa not required | 90 days |
| Curaçao | Visa not required | 90 days |
| Sint Maarten | Visa not required | 90 days |
France
| French Guiana | Visa not required | 90 days |
| French Polynesia | Visa not required | 90 days |
| (France) French West Indies | Visa not required | 90 days includes overseas departments of Guadeloupe and Martinique |
| (France) Saint Martin and Saint Barthélemy | Visa not required | 90 days |
| Mayotte | Visa not required | 90 days |
| New Caledonia | Visa not required | 90 days |
| Réunion | Visa not required | 90 days |
| Saint Pierre and Miquelon | Visa not required | 90 days |
| Wallis and Futuna | Visa not required | 90 days |
New Zealand
| Cook Islands | Visa not required | 31 days |
| Niue | Visa not required | 30 days |
| Tokelau | Visa required | |
United States
| American Samoa | Visa required | |
| Guam | Visa required | |
| Northern Mariana Islands | Visa required | |
| U.S. Virgin Islands | Visa required | |
| Puerto Rico | Visa required | |

== Non-visa restrictions ==
=== Blank passport pages ===
Many countries require a minimum number of blank pages to be available in the passport being presented, typically one or two pages. Endorsement pages, which often appear after the visa pages, are not counted as being valid or available.

=== Vaccination ===
Cover of the new International Certificate of Vaccination issued by the Bureau of Quarantine in the Philippines since 2021

The African countries of Angola, Benin, Burkina Faso, Burundi, Cameroon, Central African Republic, Democratic Republic of the Congo, Republic of the Congo, Côte d'Ivoire, Gabon, Ghana, Guinea-Bissau, Mali, Niger, Sierra Leone and Togo, South Sudan and Uganda, along with French Guiana in South America, require all incoming passengers older than nine months to one year, to have a current International Certificate of Vaccination or Prophylaxis.

Some other countries require vaccination only if the passenger is coming from an infected area or has visited one recently or has transited for 12 hours in those countries: Algeria, Botswana, Cabo Verde, Chad, Djibouti, Egypt, Eswatini, Ethiopia, Gambia, Ghana, Guinea, Lesotho, Libya, Equatorial Guinea, Eritrea, Madagascar, Malawi, Mauritania, Mauritius, Mozambique, Namibia, Nigeria, Papua New Guinea, Seychelles, Somalia, South Africa, Sudan, Tunisia, Uganda, Tanzania, Zambia and Zimbabwe.

=== Passport validity length ===
Very few countries, such as Paraguay, just require a valid passport on arrival.

However many countries and groupings now require only an identity card – especially from their neighbours. Other countries may have special bilateral arrangements that depart from the generality of their passport validity length policies to shorten the period of passport validity required for each other's citizens or even accept passports that have already expired (but not been cancelled).

Some countries, such as Japan, Ireland and the United Kingdom, require a passport valid throughout the period of the intended stay.

In the absence of specific bilateral agreements, countries requiring passports to be valid for at least 6 more months on arrival include Afghanistan, Algeria, Anguilla, Bahrain, Bhutan, Botswana, British Virgin Islands, Brunei, Cambodia, Cameroon, Cape Verde, Cayman Islands, Central African Republic, Chad, Comoros, Costa Rica, Côte d'Ivoire, Curaçao, Ecuador, Egypt, El Salvador, Equatorial Guinea, Fiji, Gabon, Guinea Bissau, Guyana, Haiti, India, Indonesia, Iran, Iraq, Israel, Jordan, Kenya, Kiribati, Kuwait, Laos, Madagascar, Malaysia, Marshall Islands, Mongolia, Myanmar, Namibia, Nepal, Nicaragua, Nigeria, Oman, Palau, Papua New Guinea, Peru, Philippines, Qatar, Rwanda, Samoa, Saudi Arabia, Singapore, Solomon Islands, Somalia, Sri Lanka, Sudan, Suriname, Tanzania, Thailand, Timor-Leste, Tokelau, Tonga, Turkey, Tuvalu, Uganda, United Arab Emirates, Vanuatu, Venezuela, and Vietnam.

Countries requiring passports valid for at least 4 months on arrival include Micronesia and Zambia.

Countries requiring passports with a validity of at least 3 months beyond the date of intended departure include Azerbaijan, Bosnia and Herzegovina, Honduras, Montenegro, Nauru, Moldova and New Zealand. Similarly, the EEA countries of Iceland, Liechtenstein, Norway, all European Union countries (except Ireland) together with Switzerland also require 3 months validity beyond the date of the bearer's intended departure unless the bearer is an EEA or Swiss national.

Countries requiring passports valid for at least 3 months on arrival include Albania, North Macedonia, Panama, and Senegal.

Bermuda requires passports to be valid for at least 45 days upon entry.

Countries that require a passport validity of at least one month beyond the date of intended departure include Eritrea, Hong Kong, Lebanon, Macau, the Maldives and South Africa.

==== Maximum passport age ====
Countries of the Schengen area require non-EU passports to be less than 10 years old upon entry.

=== Criminal record ===
Some countries, including Australia, Canada, Fiji, New Zealand and the United States, routinely deny entry to non-citizens who have a criminal record, while others impose restrictions depending on the type of conviction and the length of the sentence.

=== Persona non grata ===
The government of a country can declare a diplomat persona non grata, banning them from entering the country or expelling them if they have already entered. In non-diplomatic use, the authorities of a country may also declare a foreigner persona non grata permanently or temporarily, usually because of unlawful activity.

=== Israeli stamps ===
Kuwait, Lebanon, Libya, and Yemen do not allow entry to people with passport stamps from Israel or whose passports have either a used or an unused Israeli visa, or where there is evidence of previous travel to Israel such as entry or exit stamps from neighbouring border posts in transit countries such as Jordan and Egypt.

To circumvent this Arab League boycott of Israel, the Israeli immigration services have now mostly ceased to stamp foreign nationals' passports on either entry to or exit from Israel (unless the entry is for some work-related purposes). Since 15 January 2013, Israel no longer stamps foreign passports at Ben Gurion Airport. Passports are still (as of 22 June 2017) stamped at Erez when passing into and out of Gaza.

Iran refuses admission to holders of passports containing an Israeli visa or stamp that is less than 12 months old.

=== Biometrics ===
Several countries mandate that all travellers, or all foreign travellers, be fingerprinted on arrival and will refuse admission to or even arrest travellers who refuse to comply. In some countries, such as the United States, this may apply even to transit passengers who merely wish to change planes rather than go landside.

Fingerprinting countries/regions include Afghanistan, Argentina, Brunei, Cambodia, China, Ethiopia, Ghana, Guinea, India, Japan, Kenya (both fingerprints and a photo are taken), Malaysia upon entry and departure, Mongolia, Saudi Arabia, the Schengen Area, Singapore, South Korea, Taiwan, Thailand, Uganda, the United Arab Emirates and the United States.

Many countries also require a photo be taken of people entering the country. The United States, which does not fully implement exit control formalities at its land frontiers (although long mandated by its own legislation), intends to implement facial recognition for passengers departing from international airports to identify people who overstay their visa.

Together with fingerprint and face recognition, iris scanning is one of three biometric identification technologies internationally standardised since 2006 by the International Civil Aviation Organization (ICAO) for use in e-passports and the United Arab Emirates conducts iris scanning on visitors who need to apply for a visa. The United States Department of Homeland Security has announced plans to greatly increase the biometric data it collects at US borders. In 2018, Singapore began trials of iris scanning at three land and maritime immigration checkpoints.

== See also ==
- Visa policy of Paraguay
- Paraguayan passport
