= Visa policy of the Mercosur =

Policy on permits required to enter Mercosur

Visa policy of Mercosur member states may refer to:

- Visa policy of Argentina
- Visa policy of Bolivia
- Visa policy of Brazil
- Visa policy of Paraguay
- Visa policy of Venezuela
- Visa policy of Uruguay

== Mutual visa policy among Mercosur members ==
Destination	Nationality				
Destination	Argentina	Bolivia	Brazil	Paraguay	Uruguay
Argentina	—	90 days	90 days	3 months	3 months
Bolivia	90 days	—	90 days	90 days	90 days
Brazil	90 days	90 days	—	90 days	90 days
Paraguay	90 days	90 days	90 days	—	90 days
Uruguay	3 months	90 days	3 months	90 days	—

== See also ==
- Mercosur
