= Visa policy of Paraguay =

Policy on permits required to enter Paraguay

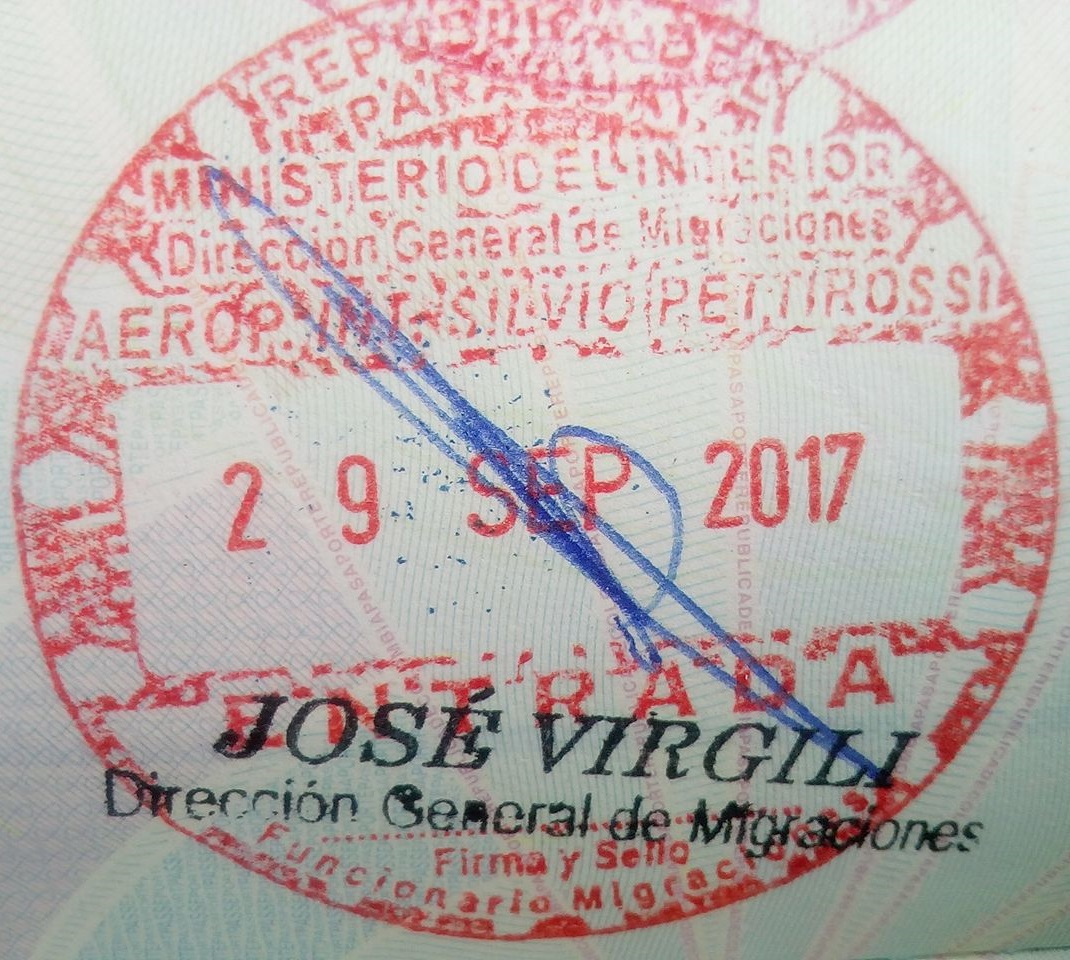
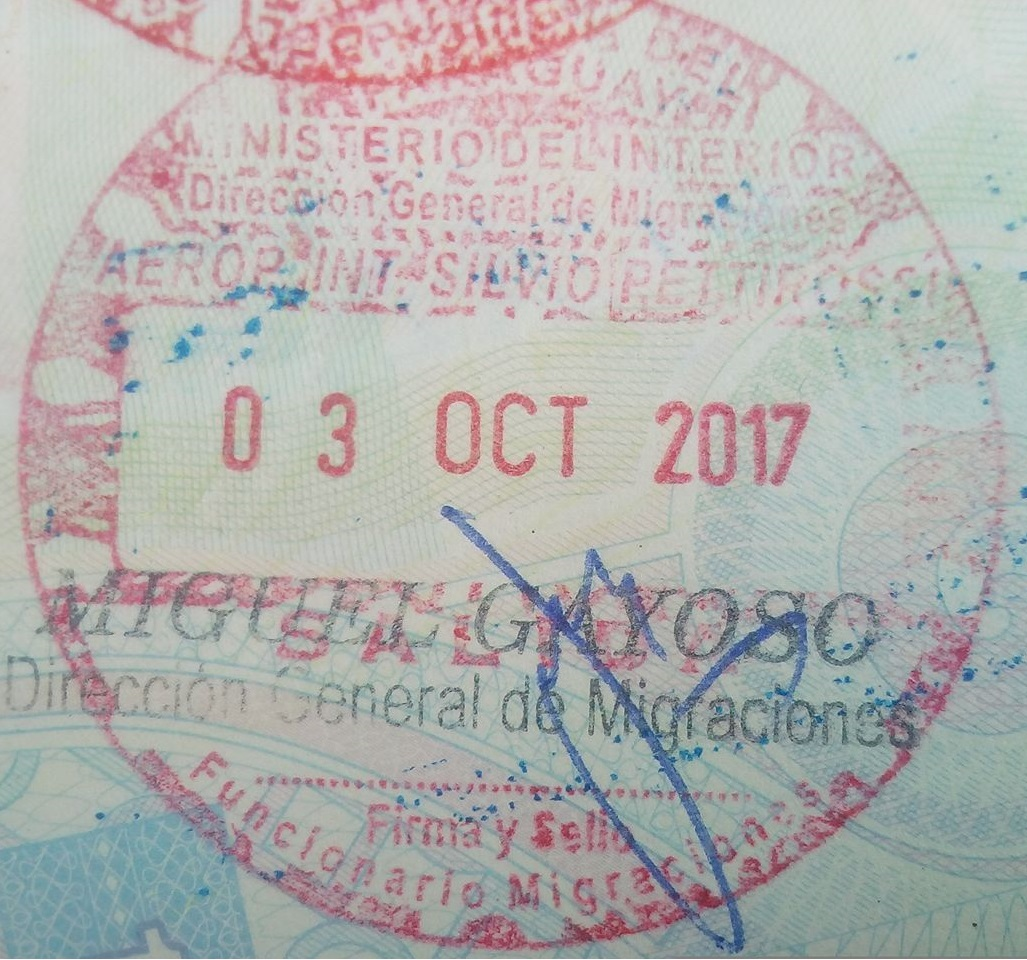
Entry and exit stamps

Visitors to Paraguay must obtain a visa unless they are citizens from one of the visa-exempt countries or citizens who may obtain a visa on arrival.

Paraguay visas are documents issued by the Ministry of Foreign Affairs and its subsequent diplomatic missions abroad; with the stated goal of regulating and facilitating migratory flows.

== Visa policy map ==
Visa policy of Paraguay Paraguay Visa not required (90 days) Visa not required (60 days) Visa not required (30 days) Visa on arrival Visa required

== Visa exemption ==
=== Ordinary passports ===
Citizens of the following countries and territories may enter Paraguay without a visa for the following period:

90 days

- All European Union member states

- Andorra
- Argentina^{ID}
- Australia
- Bahamas
- Bolivia^{ID}
- Brazil^{ID}
- Canada
- Chile^{ID}
- Colombia^{ID}
- Costa Rica
- Ecuador^{ID}
- El Salvador
- Georgia
- Guatemala
- Honduras
- Iceland
- Israel
- Japan
- Liechtenstein
- Mexico
- Monaco
- Mongolia
- New Zealand
- Nicaragua
- Norway
- Panama
- Peru^{ID}
- Russia
- Saint Kitts and Nevis
- South Africa
- Switzerland
- Taiwan
- Turkey
- Trinidad and Tobago
- Ukraine
- United Arab Emirates
- United Kingdom (Note: Including all types of British passports.)
- United States
- United States
- Uruguay^{ID}

60 days

- Dominican Republic

30 days

- Malaysia
- Philippines
- Singapore
- South Korea

_{ID - May enter with an ID card in lieu of a passport.}

Date of visa changes

Unknown: Argentina, Dominican Republic, Uruguay

- 1 July 1959: Spain
- 5 March 1960: Brazil
- 22 November 1960: Belgium, Luxembourg and Netherlands
- 1 December 1962: Germany
- 1 July 1963: Denmark, Norway and Sweden
- 9 February 1964: Liehtinshtein and Switzerland
- 9 June 1965: Italy
- 19 February 1966: Israel
- 27 November 1966: United Kingdom
- 12 August 1967: Ecuador
- 18 March 1969: Austria
- 20 September 1977: Chile
- 8 November 1990: Japan
- 16 July 1992: Costa Rica
- 28 October 1992: Finland
- 7 December 1992: Colombia
- 21 September 1993: Bolivia
- 26 January 1994: Peru
- 12 December 1997: France
- 21 August 1998: Greece
- 8 November 1998: El Salvador
- 2 December 1998: Portugal
- 18 April 1999: Panama
- 18 January 2004: Hungary
- 9 July 2004: Czech Republic
- 19 July 2004: South Africa
- 29 December 2004: Cyprus, Estonia, Ireland, Latvia, Lithuania, Malta, Poland, Slovakia and Slovenia
- 30 March 2006: South Korea
- 21 August 2006: Iceland
- 28 March 2007: Croatia
- 17 May 2007: Romania
- 8 August 2007: Andorra
- 31 December 2007: Guatemala, Honduras and Nicaragua
- 13 January 2008: Turkey
- 27 March 2008: Bulgaria
- 13 September 2008: Mexico
- 28 May 2009: Ukraine
- 20 October 2014: Russia
- 20 July 2017: Taiwan
- 5 October 2017: Monaco and Singapore
- 5 April 2019: Dominican Republic
- 16 August 2019: United Arab Emirates
- 12 October 2021: United States of America, Canada, Australia and New Zealand
- 3 February 2023: Georgia
- 9 January 2024: Mongolia, Saint Kitts and Nevis
- 2 August 2024: Bahamas
- 30 December 2025: Malaysia and Philippines

=== Non-ordinary passports ===
Holders of diplomatic, official or service passports of Azerbaijan, Belize (30 days), Cuba, Dominican Republic (60 days), India, Indonesia (30 days), Kazakhstan, Lebanon (30 days), Mongolia, Morocco, Philippines, Serbia, Singapore (30 days), South Korea (30 days), Taiwan, Vatican City and Vietnam (30 days) do not require a visa for up to 90 days (unless otherwise noted).

=== Future changes ===
Paraguay has signed visa exemption agreements with the following countries, but they have not yet entered into force:

Country	Passports	Agreement signed on
Philippines	Ordinary	11 May 2026
Saudi Arabia	Diplomatic, special	23 September 2026

== Visa on arrival ==
Citizens of the following countries may obtain a visa on arrival for the following period:

30 days

- Indonesia
- Oman
- Qatar
- Vietnam

15 days

- Thailand

== Online visa application ==
Foreign citizens who need a visa for Paraguay may submit the visa application online, but must later go to a Paraguayan embassy or consulate to complete the process.

== See also ==
- Visa requirements for Paraguayan citizens
