= List of diplomatic missions of Paraguay =

This is a list of diplomatic missions of Paraguay. Paraguay is landlocked between two South American giants, Brazil and Argentina, and therefore it has several consulates in both countries. It is also one of the most significant countries and the only South American country to have an embassy in Taipei instead of Beijing.

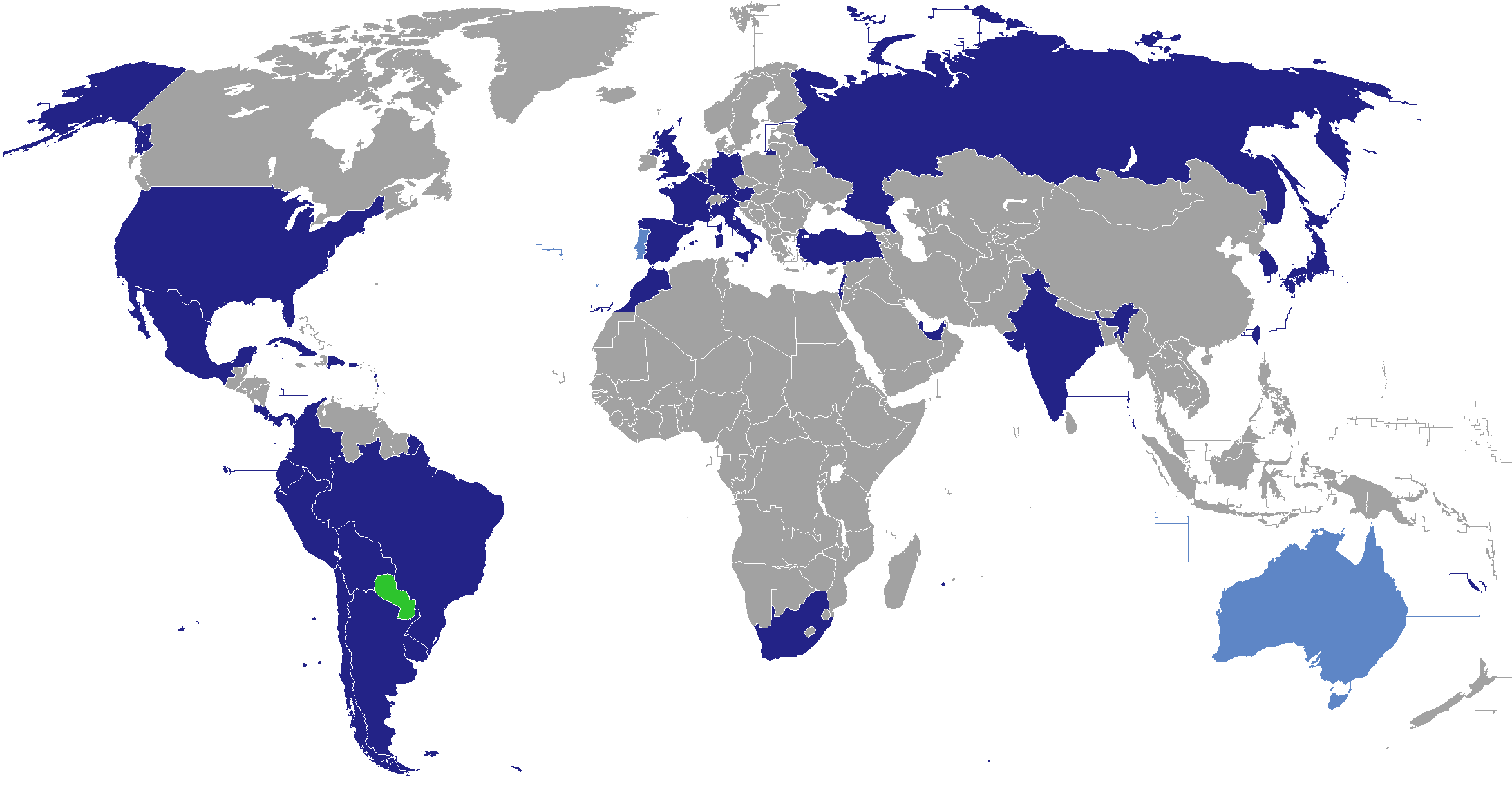
Map of Paraguayan diplomatic missions Paraguay Countries that host a Paraguayan embassy

== Current missions ==
=== Africa ===
Host country	Host city	Mission	Concurrent accreditation	Ref.
Morocco	Rabat	Embassy	Countries: Benin; Burkina Faso; Cameroon; Djibouti; Eritrea; Gambia; Ghana; Ivory Coast; Mali; Mauritania; Nigeria; Senegal; Sudan; Tunisia	
South Africa	Pretoria	Embassy	Countries: Angola; Botswana; Congo-Brazzaville; Equatorial Guinea; Eswatini; Ethiopia; Kenya; Mauritius; Mozambique; Namibia; Seychelles; Uganda; Zambia; Zimbabwe	

=== Americas ===
Host country	Host city	Mission	Concurrent accreditation	Ref.
Argentina	Buenos Aires	Embassy		
Argentina	Buenos Aires	Consulate-General		
Argentina	Clorinda	Consulate		
Argentina	Formosa	Consulate		
Argentina	La Plata	Consulate		
Argentina	Posadas	Consulate		
Argentina	Puerto Iguazú	Consulate		
Argentina	Resistencia	Consulate		
Argentina	Rosario	Consulate		
Argentina	Salta	Consulate		
Argentina	San Justo	Consulate		
Bolivia	La Paz	Embassy		
Bolivia	Santa Cruz de la Sierra	Consulate-General		
Brazil	Brasília	Embassy	Countries: Guyana; Suriname	
Brazil	Curitiba	Consulate-General	Countries: Guyana; Suriname	
Brazil	Foz do Iguaçu	Consulate-General	Countries: Guyana; Suriname	
Brazil	Rio de Janeiro	Consulate-General	Countries: Guyana; Suriname	
Brazil	São Paulo	Consulate-General	Countries: Guyana; Suriname	
Brazil	Guaíra	Consulate	Countries: Guyana; Suriname	
Brazil	Ponta Porã	Consulate	Countries: Guyana; Suriname	
Brazil	Porto Murtinho	Consulate	Countries: Guyana; Suriname	
Chile	Santiago de Chile	Embassy		
Chile	Santiago de Chile	Consulate-General		
Chile	Iquique	Consulate		
Colombia	Bogotá	Embassy		
Costa Rica	San José	Embassy	Countries: El Salvador	
Cuba	Havana	Embassy		
Dominican Republic	Santo Domingo	Embassy		
Ecuador	Quito	Embassy		
Mexico	Mexico City	Embassy	Countries: Guatemala	
Panama	Panama City	Embassy	Countries: Honduras; Nicaragua; Venezuela	
Peru	Lima	Embassy		
United States	Washington, D.C.	Embassy	Countries: Canada	
United States	Washington, D.C.	Consular Section	Countries: Canada	
United States	Los Angeles	Consulate-General	Countries: Canada	
United States	Miami	Consulate-General	Countries: Canada	
United States	New York City	Consulate-General	Countries: Canada	
Uruguay	Montevideo	Embassy		
Uruguay	Montevideo	Consulate-General		

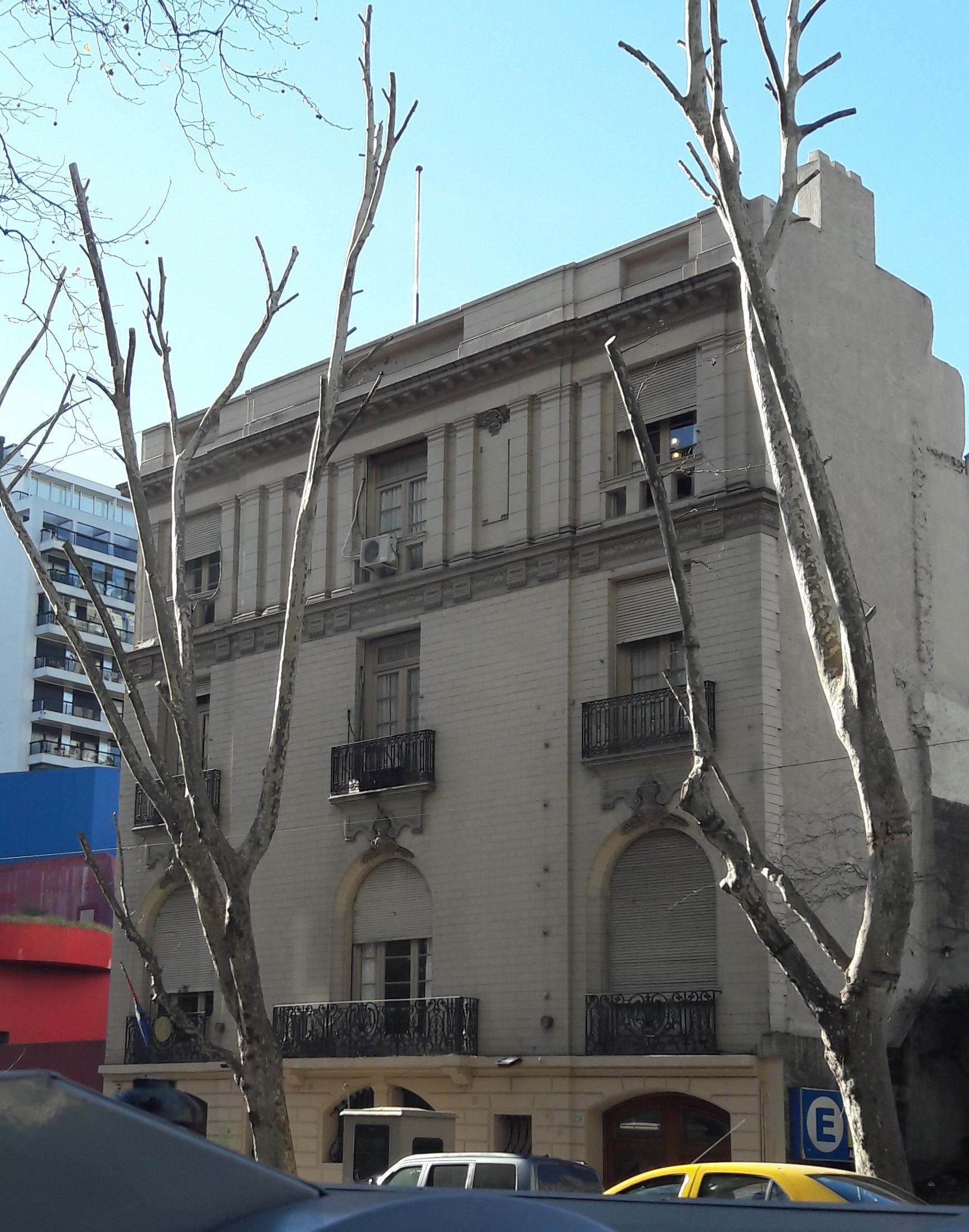
Embassy in Buenos Aires

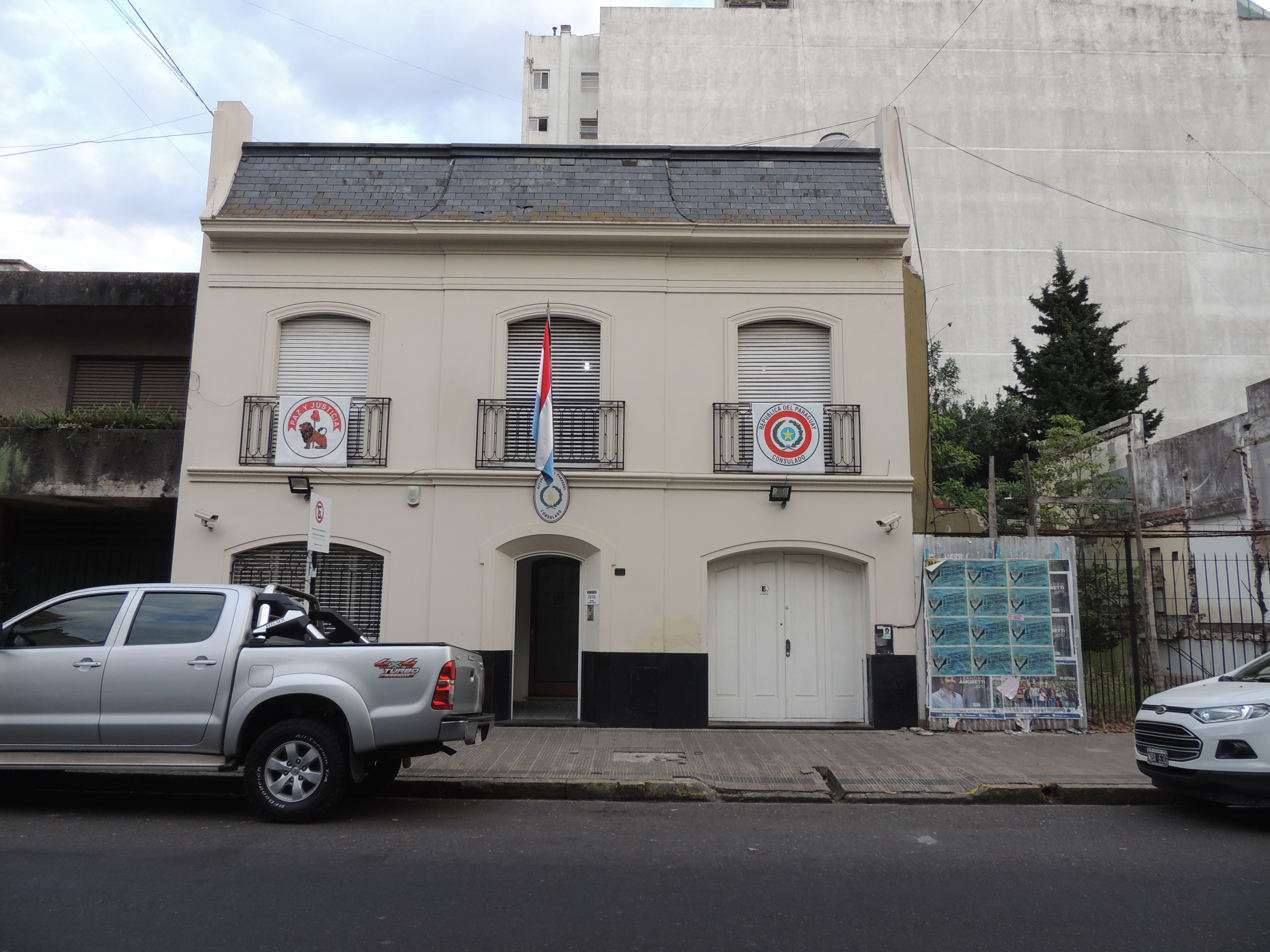
Consulate in La Plata

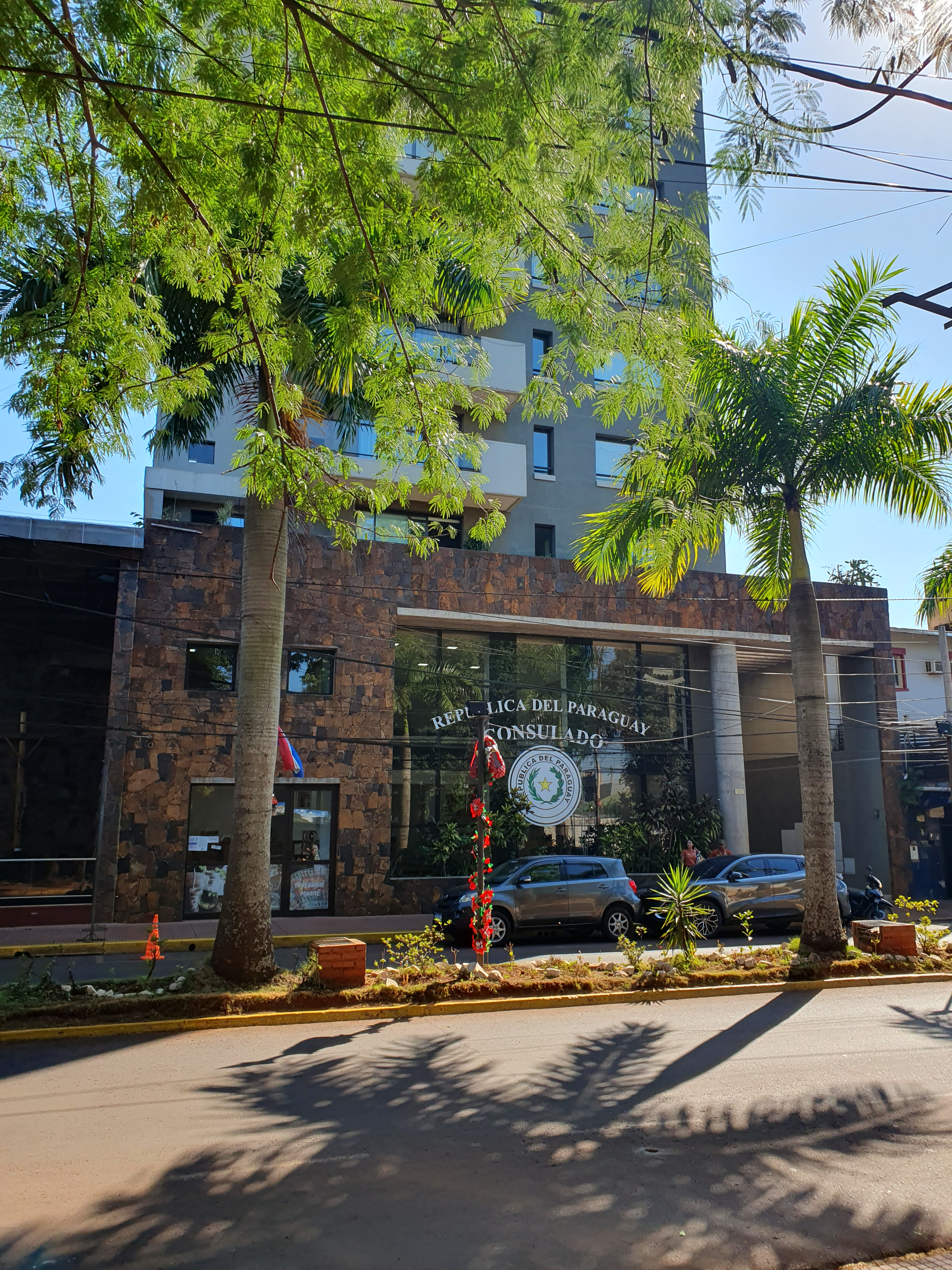
Consulate in Puerto Iguazú

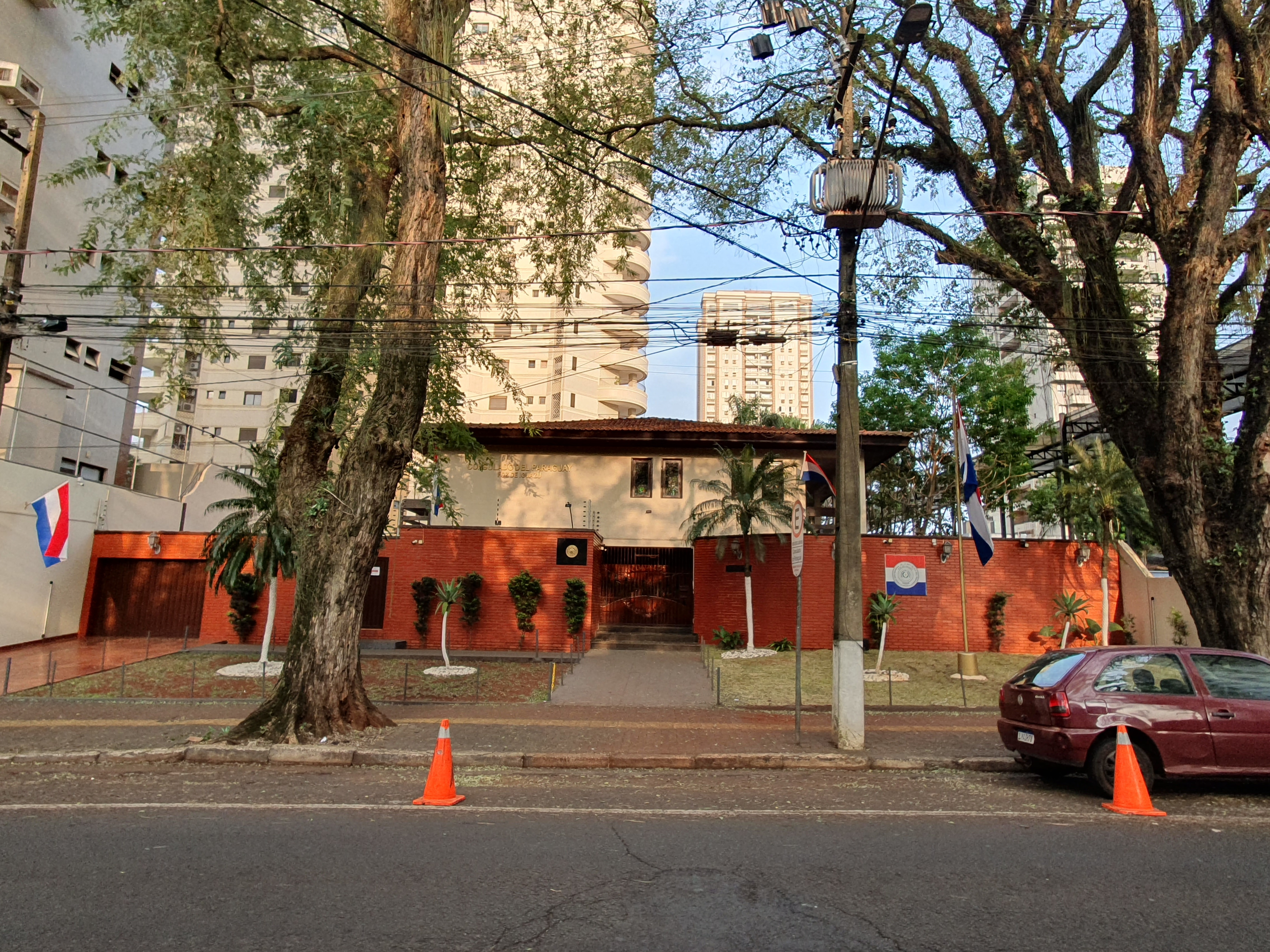
Consulate-General in Foz do Iguaçu

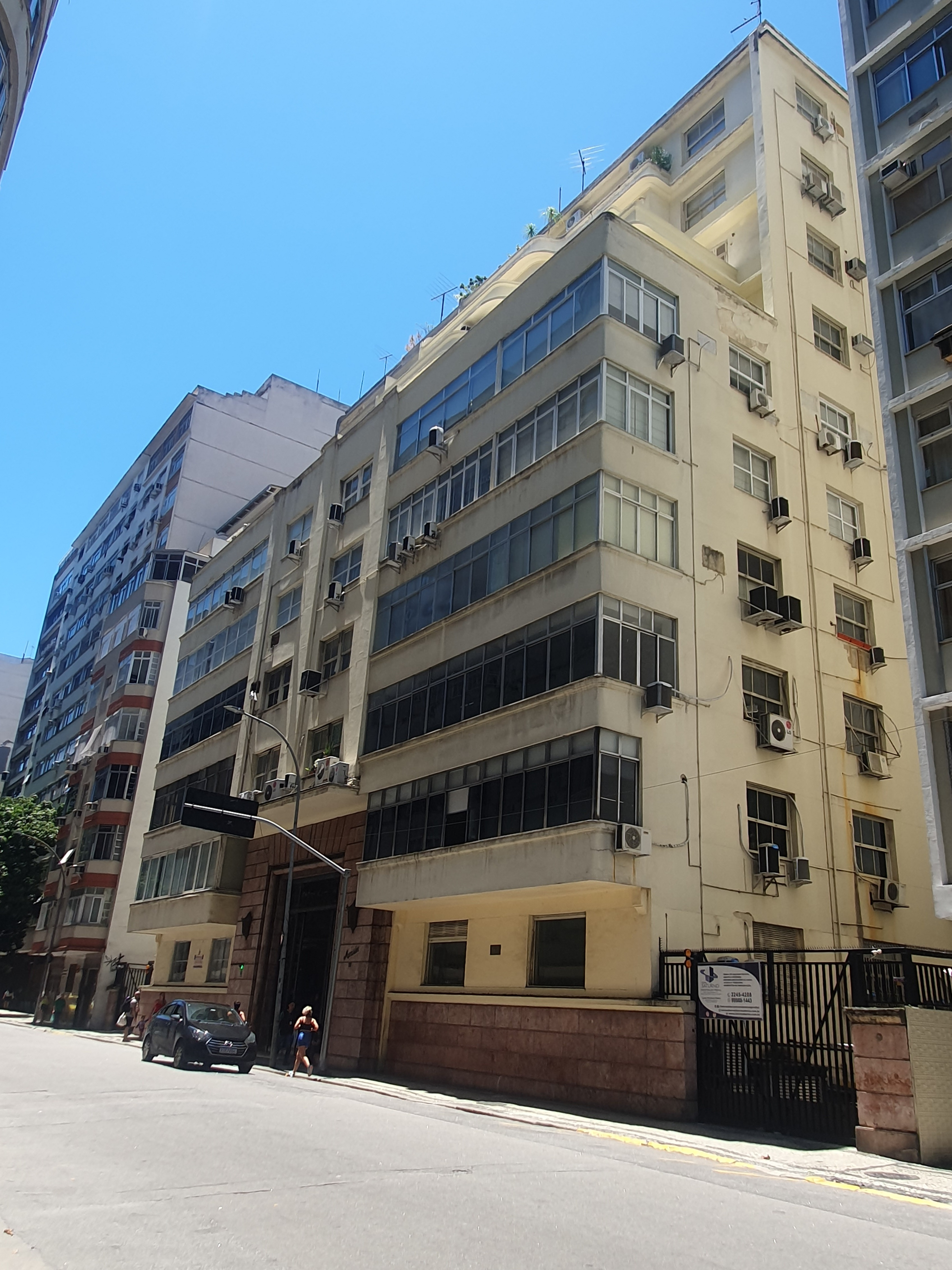
Building hosting the Consulate-General in Rio de Janeiro

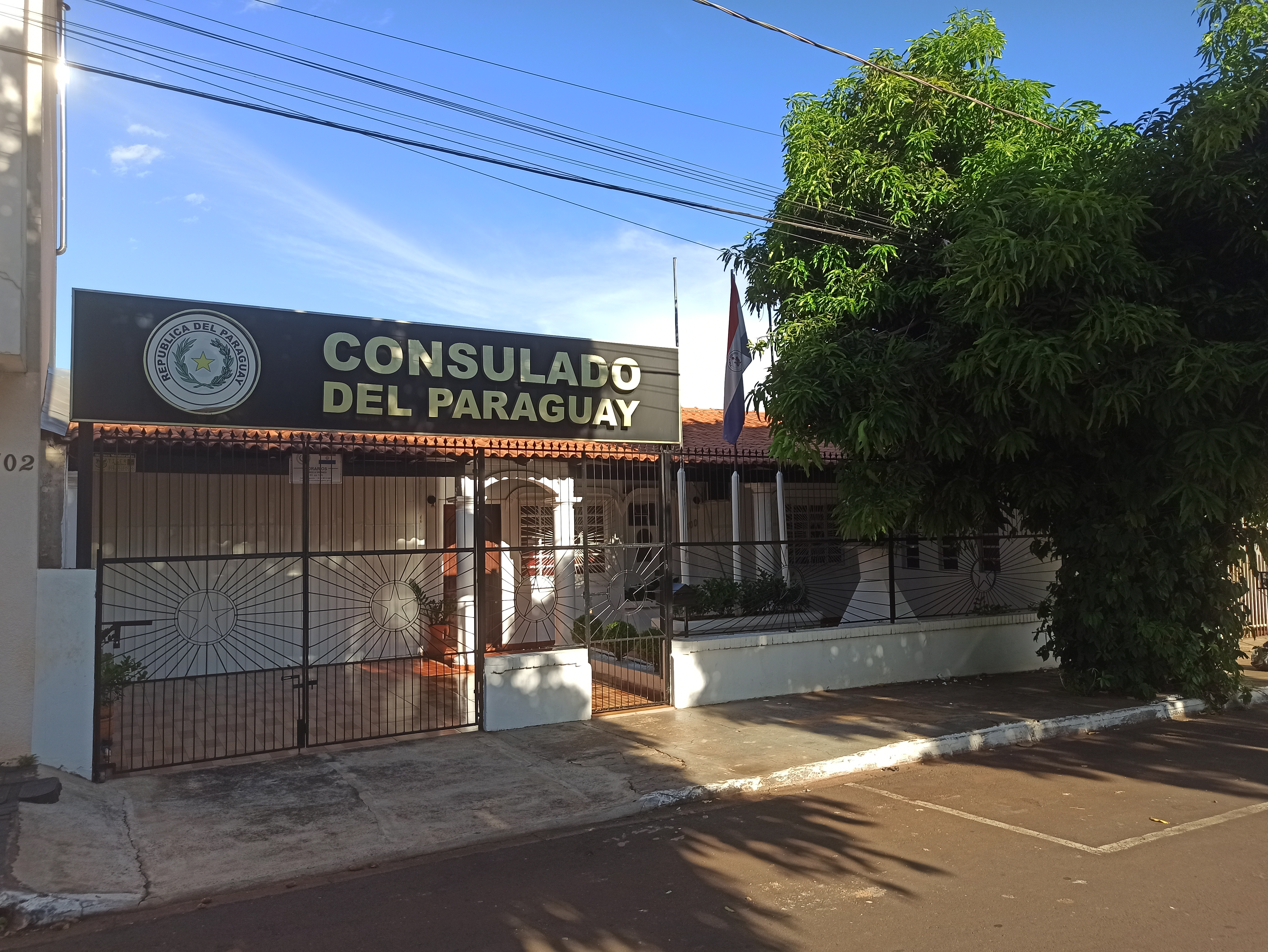
Consulate in Guaíra

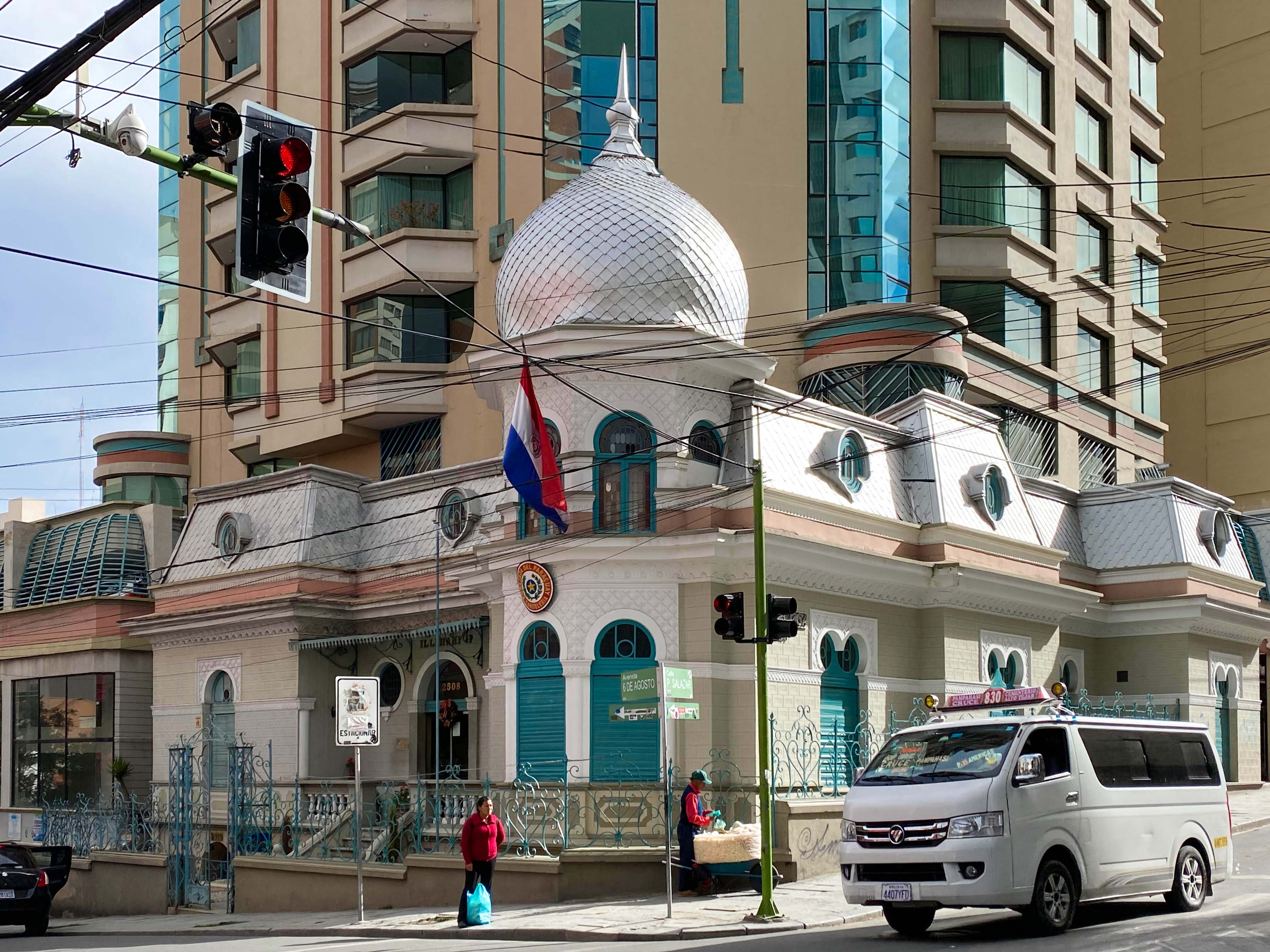
Embassy in La Paz

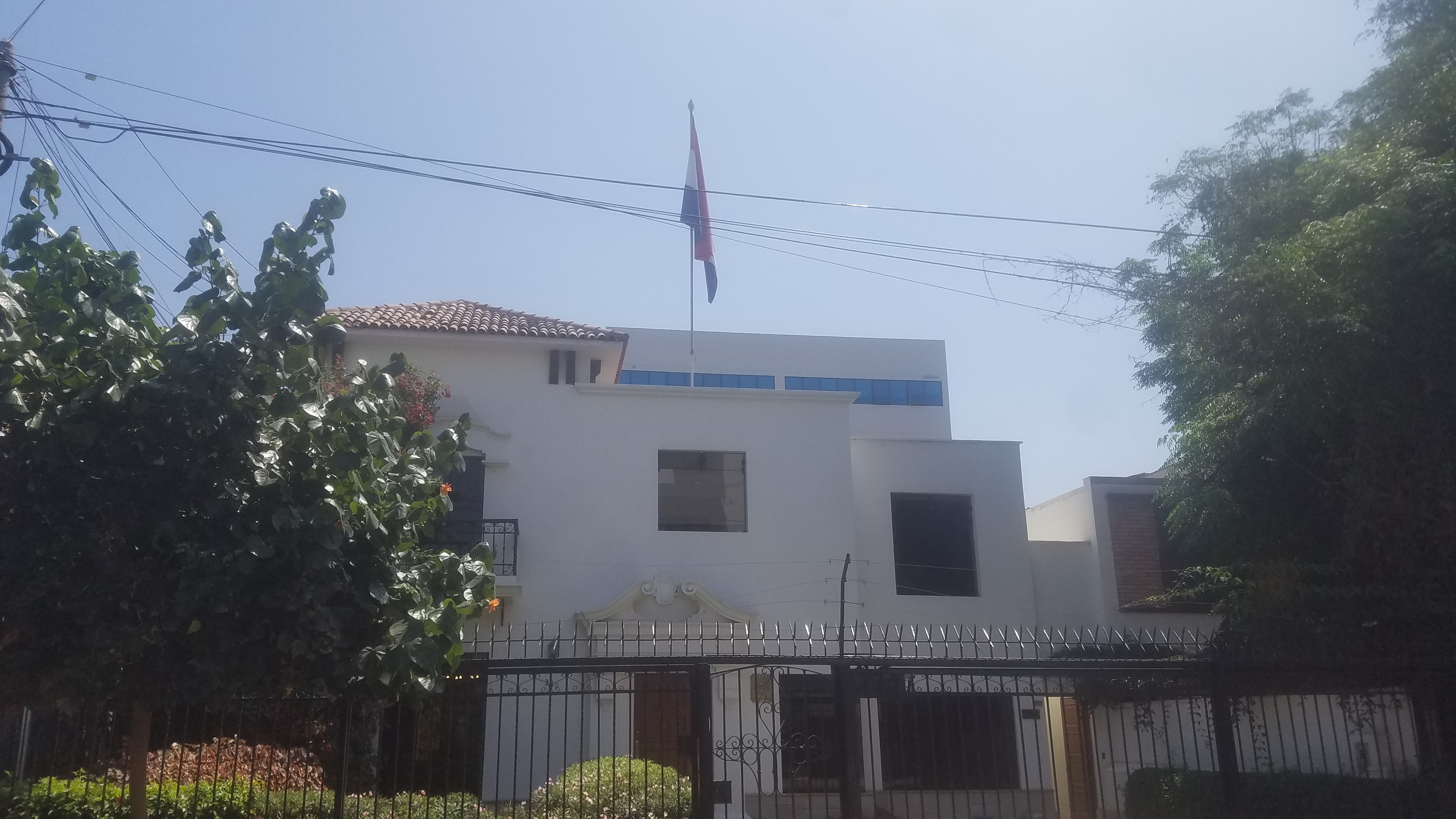
Embassy in Lima

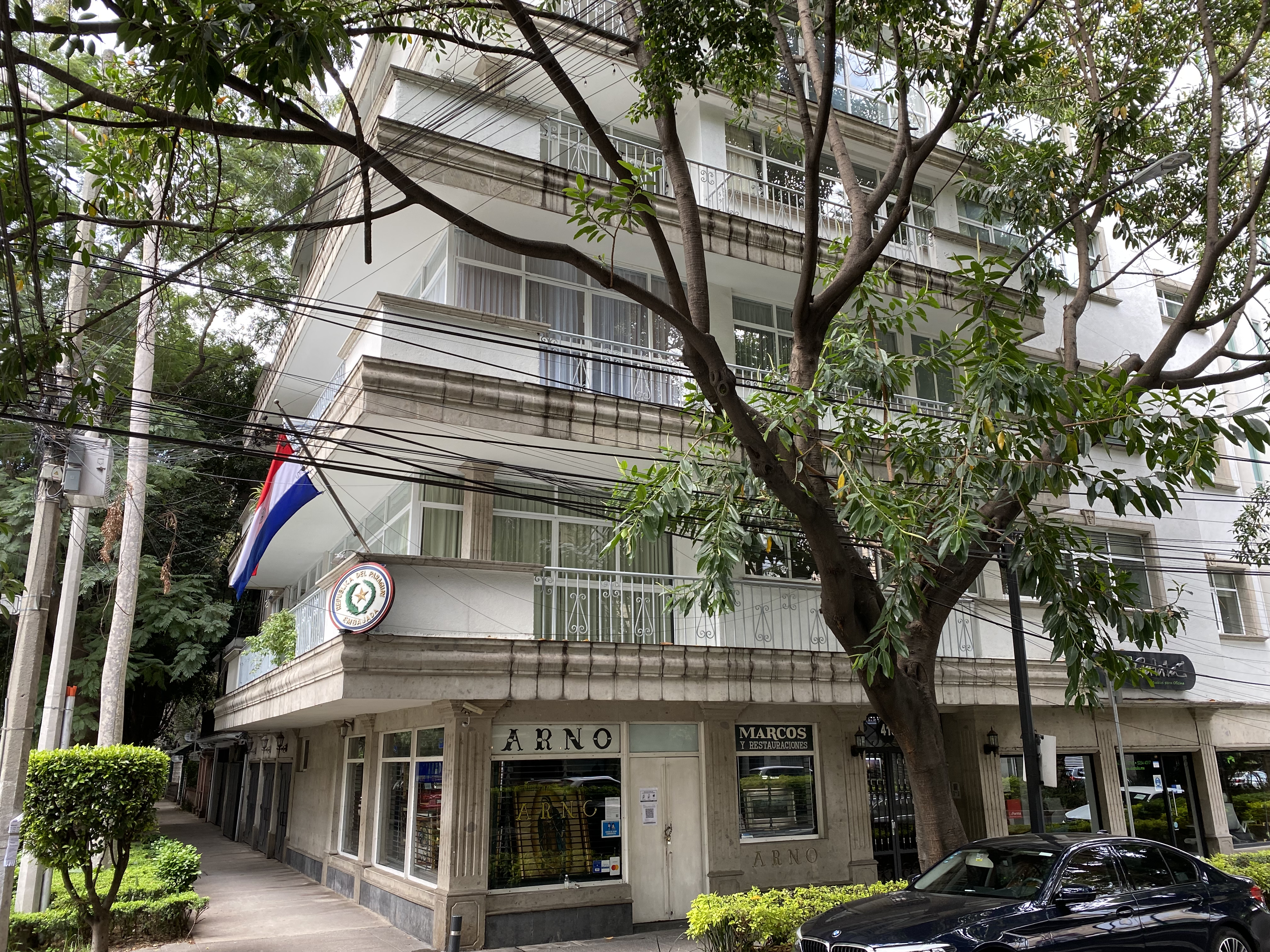
Embassy in Mexico City

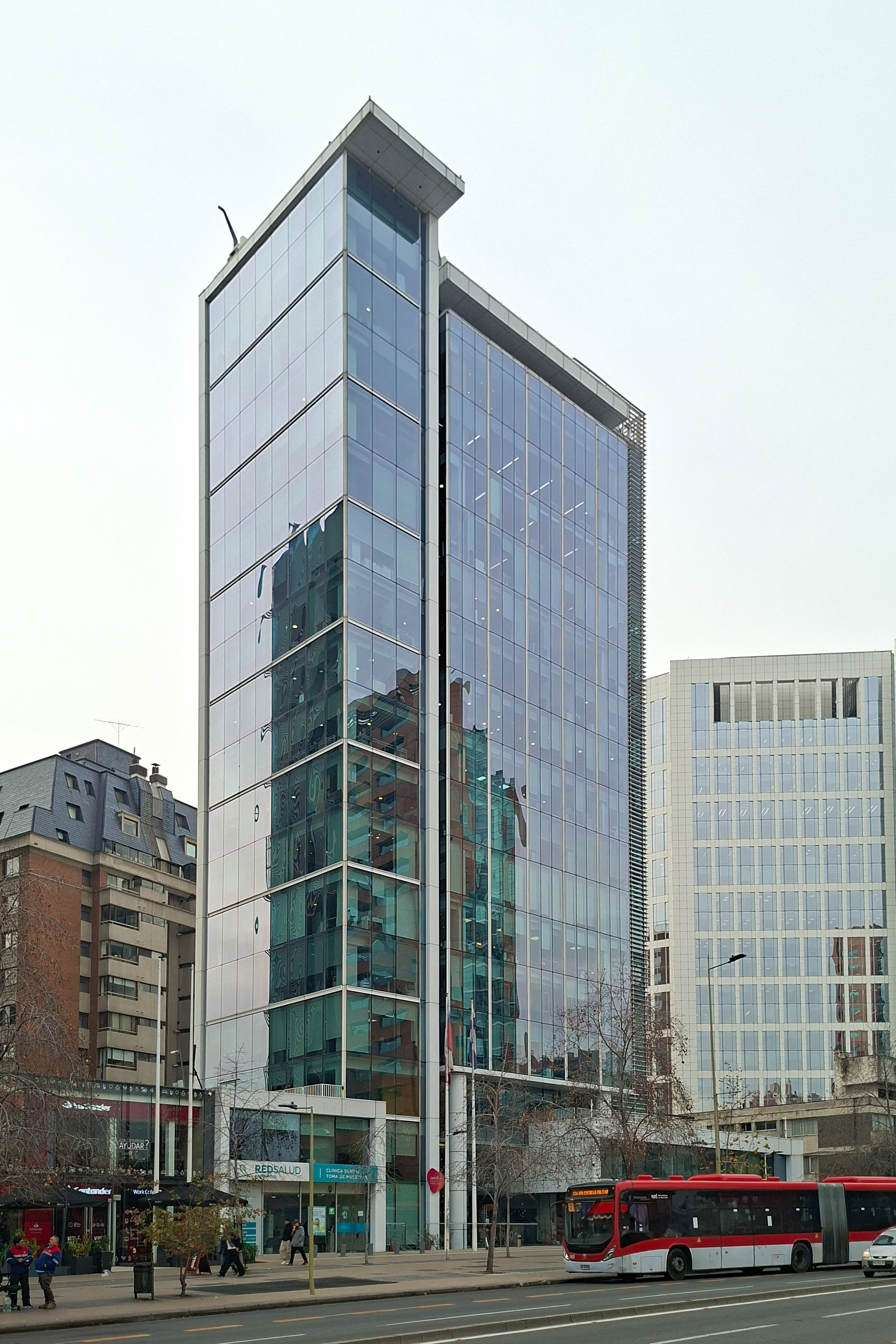
Building hosting the Embassy in Santiago de Chile

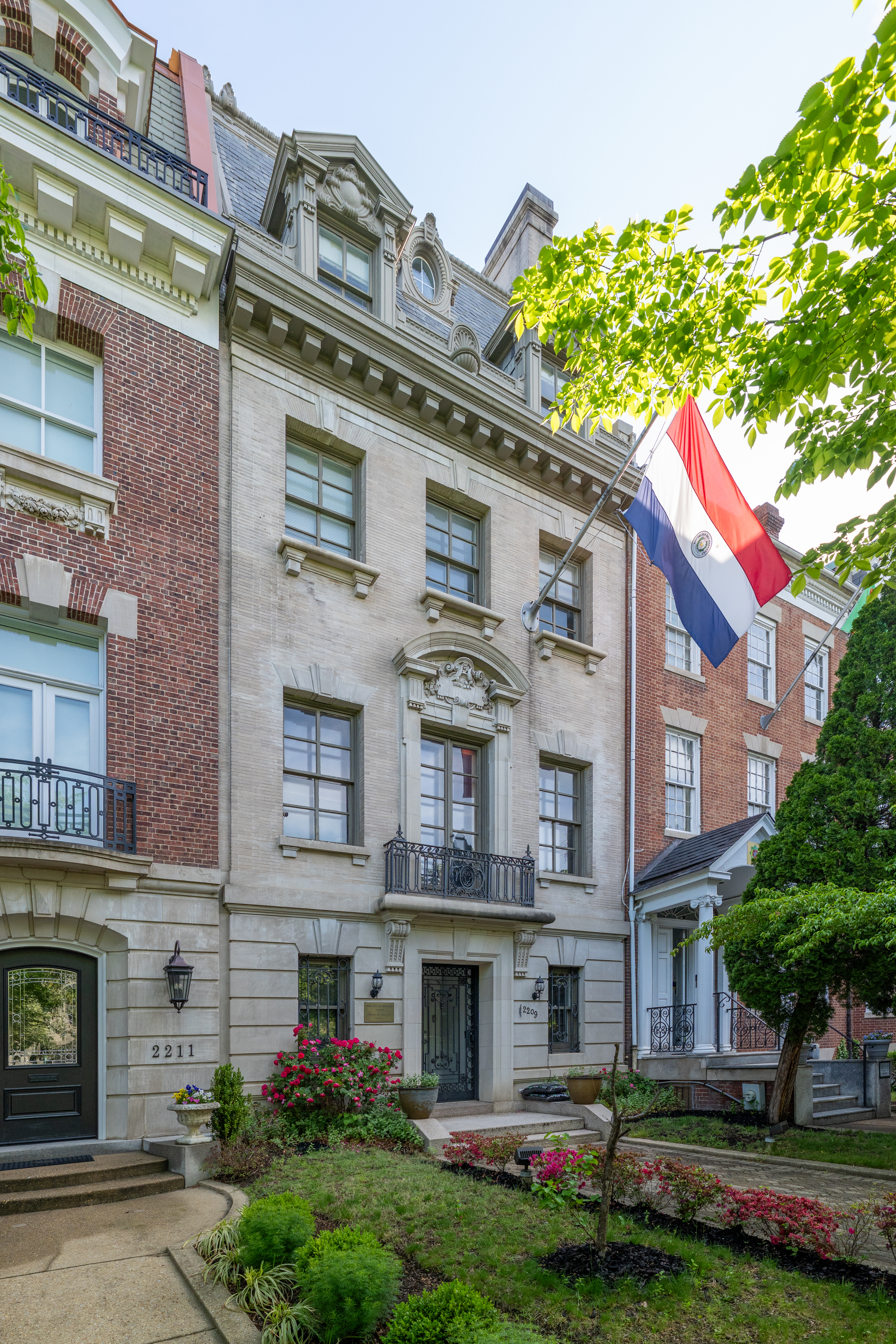
Embassy in Washington, D.C.

=== Asia ===
Host country	Host city	Mission	Concurrent accreditation	Ref.
India	New Delhi	Embassy	Countries: Bangladesh; Malaysia; Maldives; Nepal; Sri Lanka; Thailand	
Israel	Jerusalem (Note: The Embassy was transferred from Herzliya to Jerusalem on December 12, 2024.)	Embassy	Countries: Cyprus	
Japan	Tokyo	Embassy	Countries: Australia; Brunei; Indonesia; Laos; New Zealand; Vietnam; Consular jurisdiction only: (Note: Hong Kong and Macau are listed only under the consular jurisdiction of the Paraguayan Embassy in Tokyo. Under the Hong Kong Basic Law and Macau Basic Law, the People's Republic of China is responsible for diplomatic and defence affairs of Hong Kong and Macau. As of 2024, China has yet to establish formal diplomatic relations with Paraguay.); Hong Kong Macau	
Lebanon	Beirut	Embassy	Countries: Jordan; Palestine; Syria	
Qatar	Doha	Embassy	Countries: Egypt; Kuwait; Oman; International Organizations: International Renewable Energy Agency	
Republic of China (Taiwan)	Taipei	Embassy		
South Korea	Seoul	Embassy	Countries: Cambodia; Mongolia; Philippines; Singapore; Consular jurisdiction only: China (Note: The People's Republic of China is listed only under the consular jurisdiction of the Paraguayan Embassy in Seoul. As of 2024, the two countries have yet to establish formal diplomatic relations.)	
Turkey	Ankara	Embassy	Countries: Azerbaijan; Georgia; Iran; Iraq	
United Arab Emirates	Abu Dhabi	Embassy	Countries: Bahrain; Pakistan; Saudi Arabia	

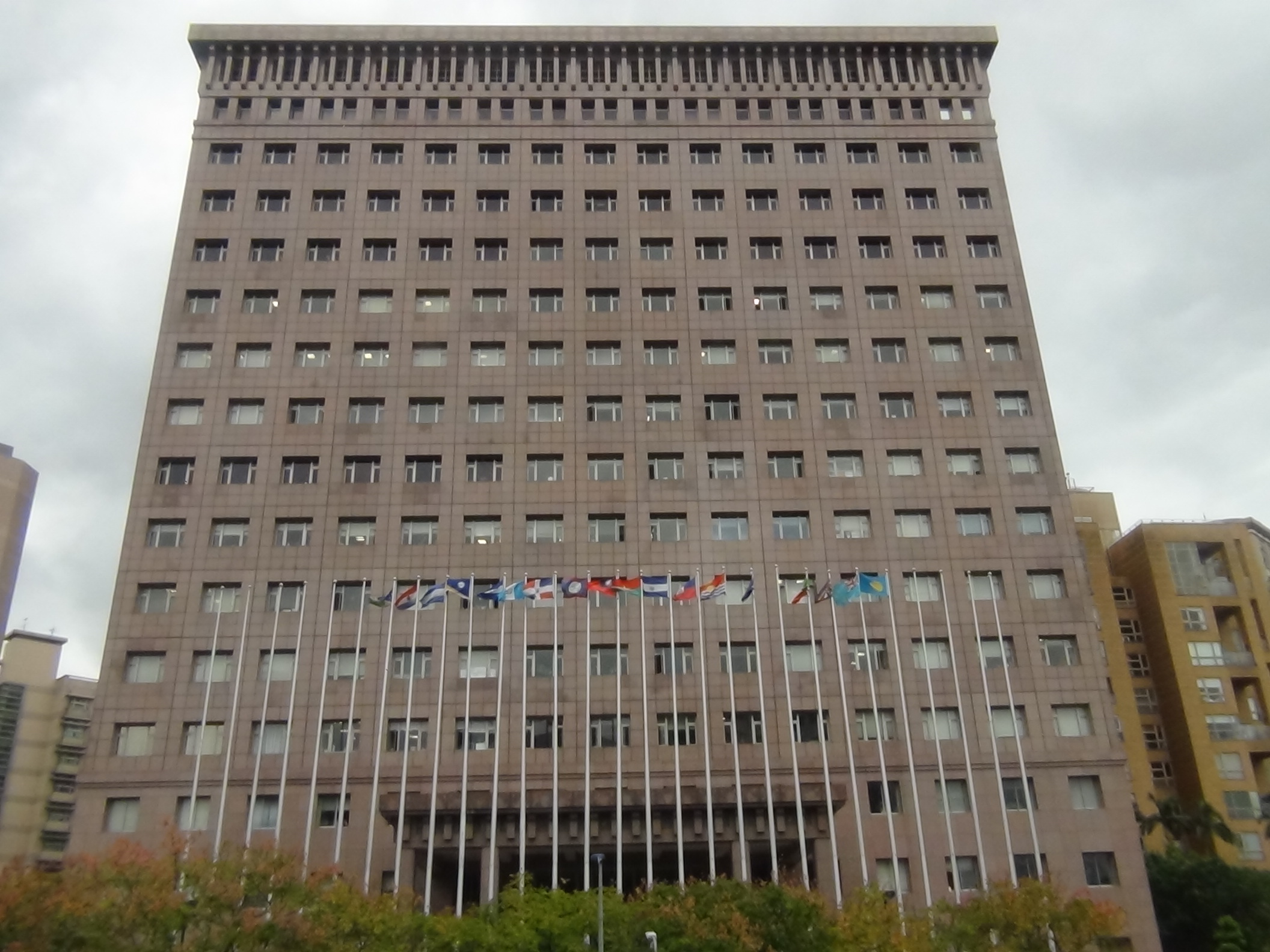
Building hosting the embassy in Taipei

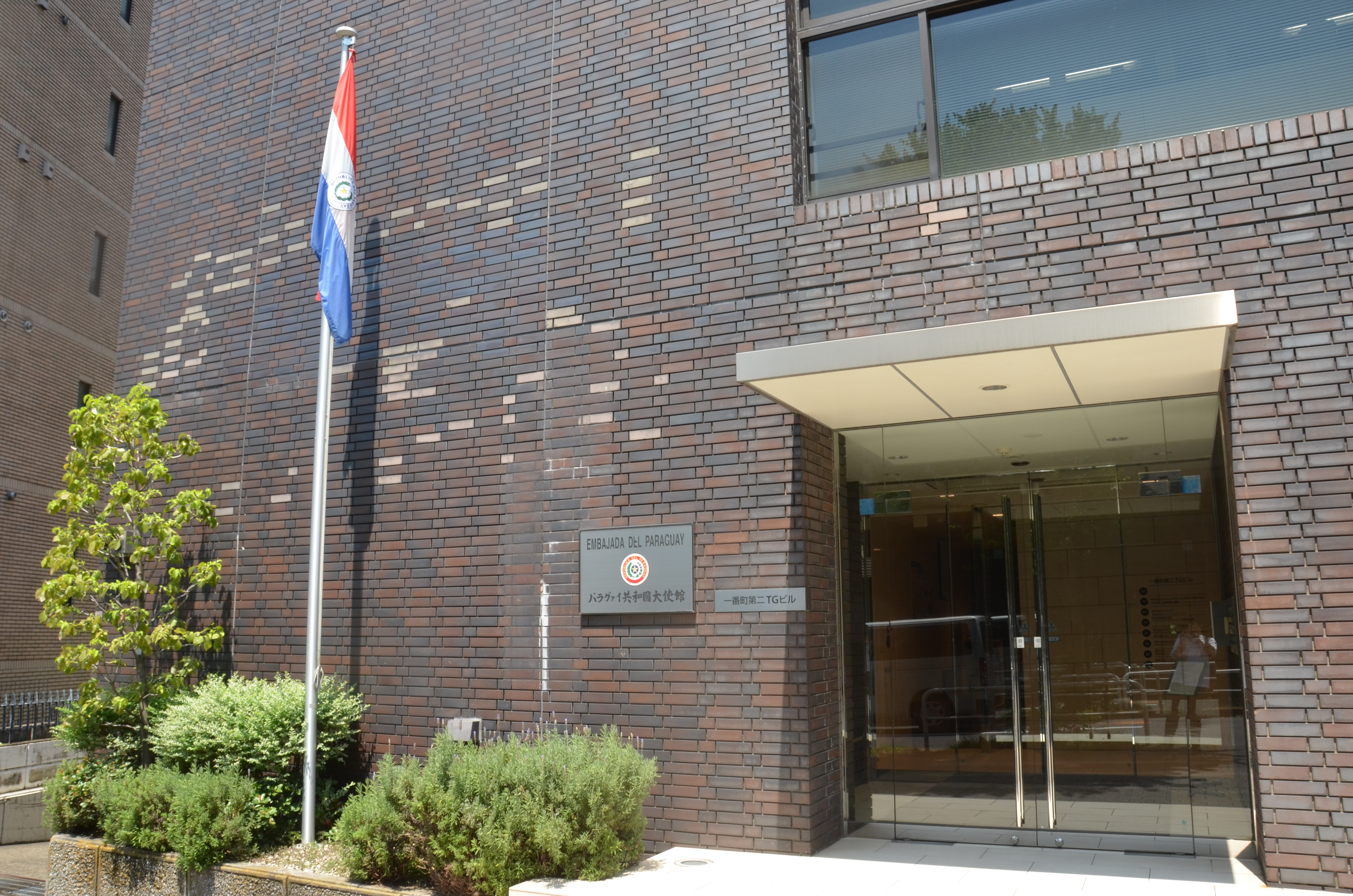
Building hosting the embassy in Tokyo

=== Europe ===
Host country	Host city	Mission	Concurrent accreditation	Ref.
Austria	Vienna	Embassy	Countries: Bulgaria; Croatia; Czechia; Hungary; Moldova; Romania; Slovakia; Slovenia; International Organizations: United Nations; International Atomic Energy Agency; UNIDO; UNODC; UNCITRAL	
Belgium	Brussels	Embassy	Countries: Luxembourg; Netherlands; Portugal; International Organizations: European Union; Organisation for the Prohibition of Chemical Weapons	
France	Paris	Embassy	Countries: Monaco; Sweden; Switzerland	
Germany	Berlin	Embassy	Countries: Denmark; Estonia; Finland; Latvia; Liechtenstein; Lithuania; Poland; Ukraine	
Germany	Frankfurt	Consulate-General	Countries: Denmark; Estonia; Finland; Latvia; Liechtenstein; Lithuania; Poland; Ukraine	
Holy See (Note: The Paraguayan Embassy to the Holy See is located outside Vatican territory, in Rome.)	Rome	Embassy	Countries: San Marino; Sovereign Entity: Sovereign Military Order of Malta	
Italy	Rome	Embassy	Countries: Albania; Bosnia and Herzegovina; Greece; Malta; Montenegro; North Macedonia; Serbia; International Organizations: Food and Agriculture Organization; International Fund for Agricultural Development; World Food Programme	
Portugal	Lisbon	Consulate-General		
Russia	Moscow	Embassy	Countries: Armenia; Belarus; Kazakhstan; Kyrgyzstan; Tajikistan; Turkmenistan; Uzbekistan	
Spain	Madrid	Embassy	Countries: Algeria; Andorra	
Spain	Madrid	Consulate-General	Countries: Algeria; Andorra	
Spain	Barcelona	Consulate-General	Countries: Algeria; Andorra	
Spain	Málaga	Consulate-General	Countries: Algeria; Andorra	
United Kingdom	London	Embassy	Countries: Iceland; Ireland; Norway	

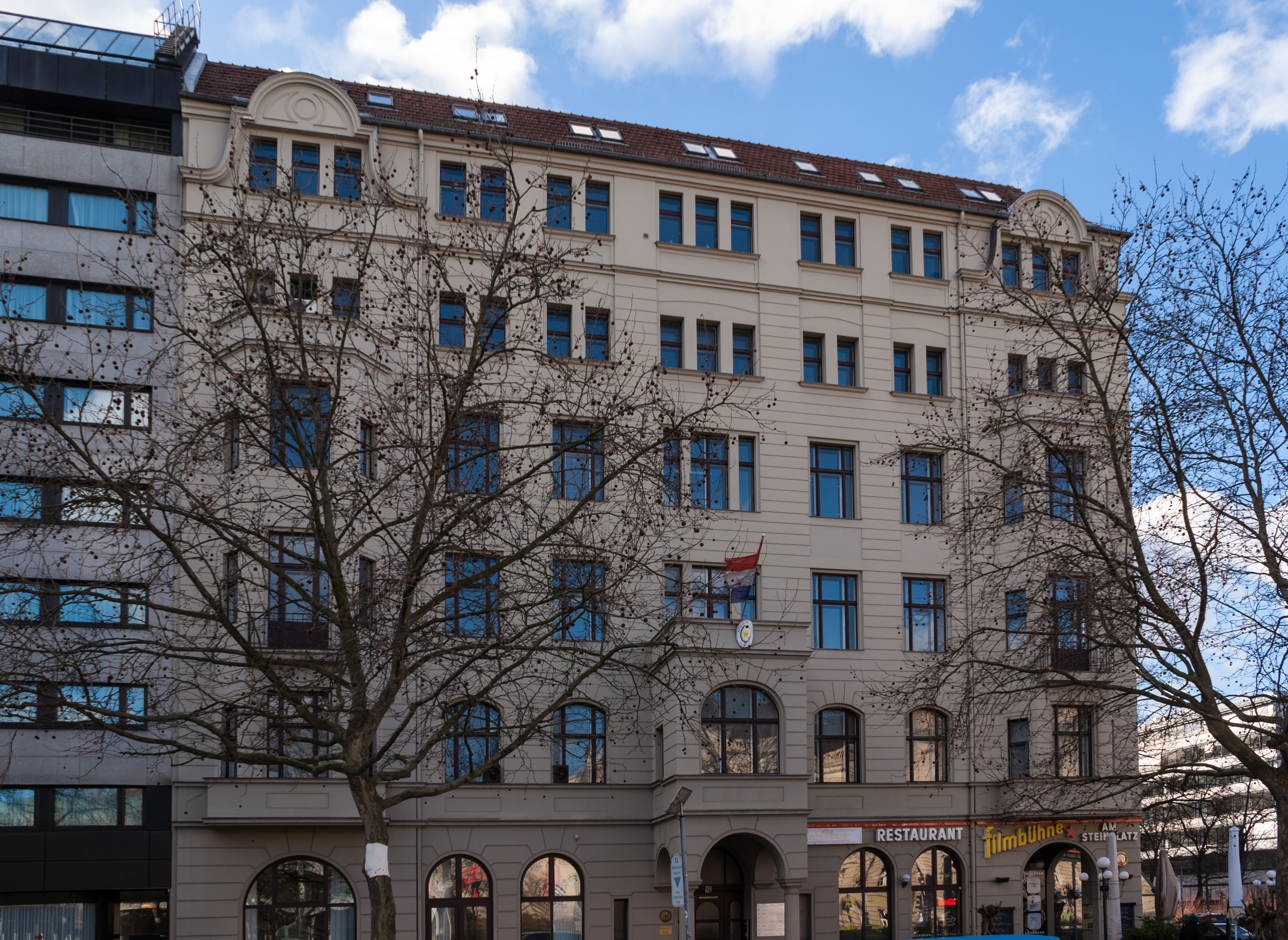
Building hosting the embassy in Berlin

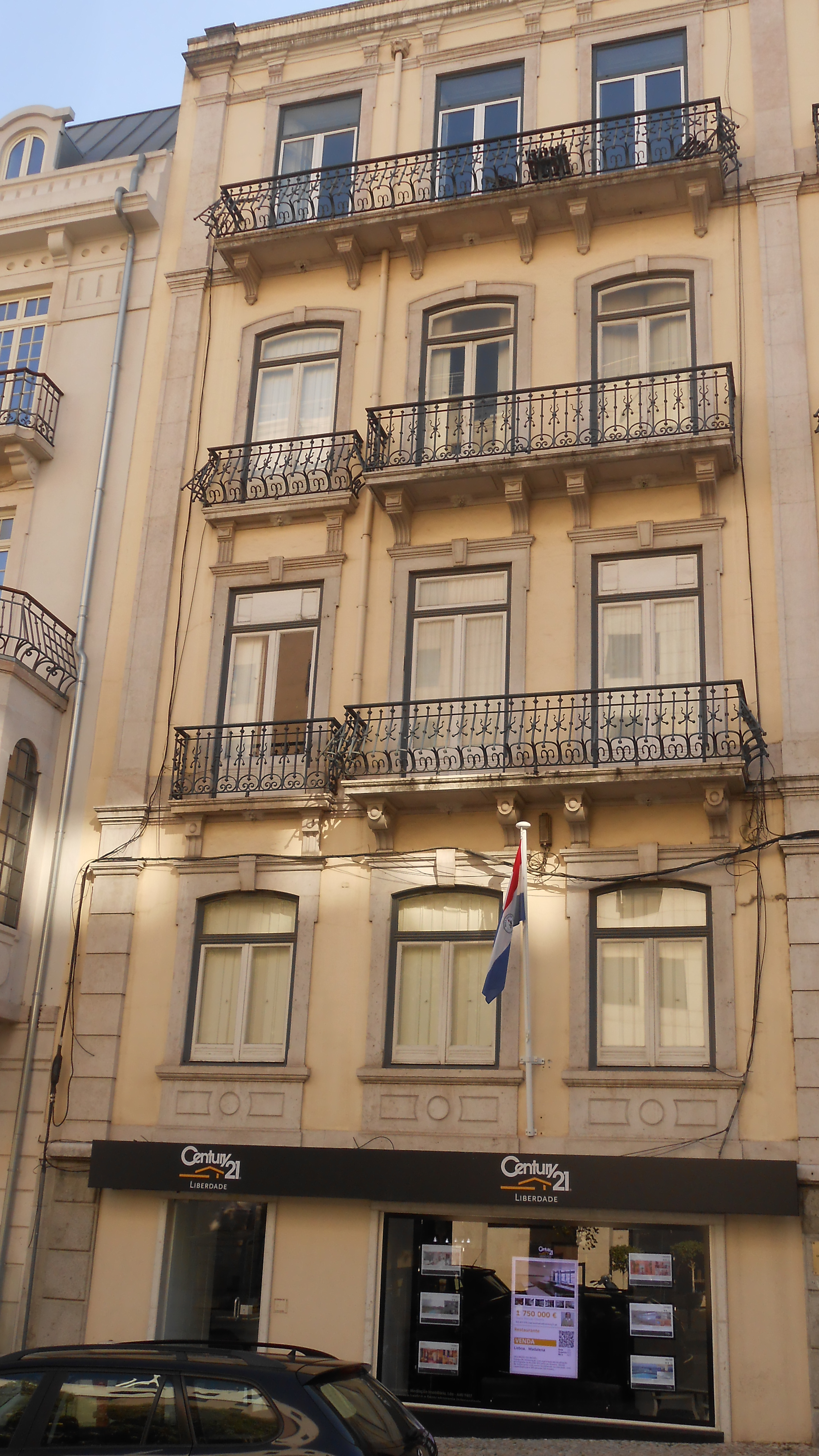
Building hosting the Consulate-General in Lisbon

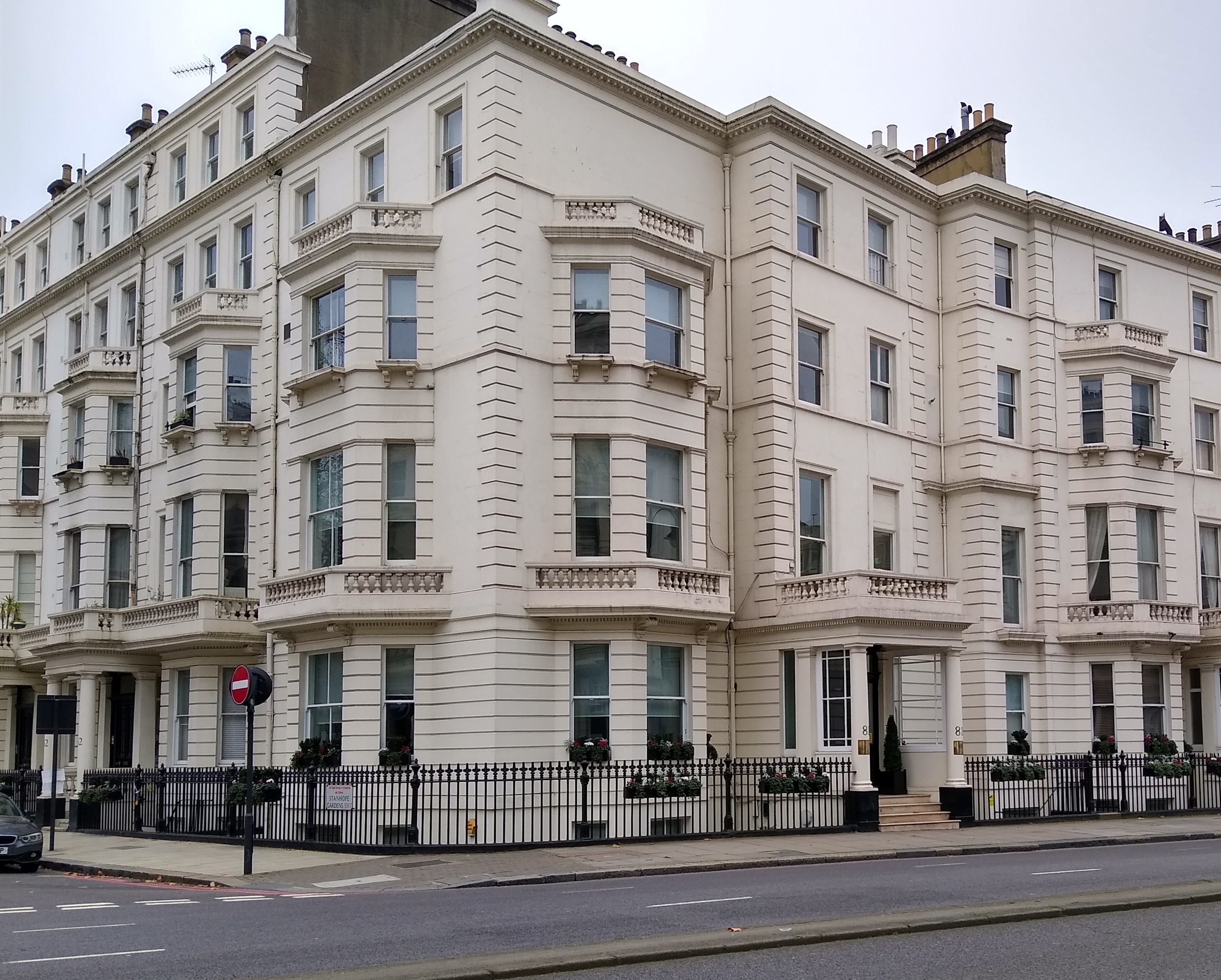
Building hosting the embassy in London

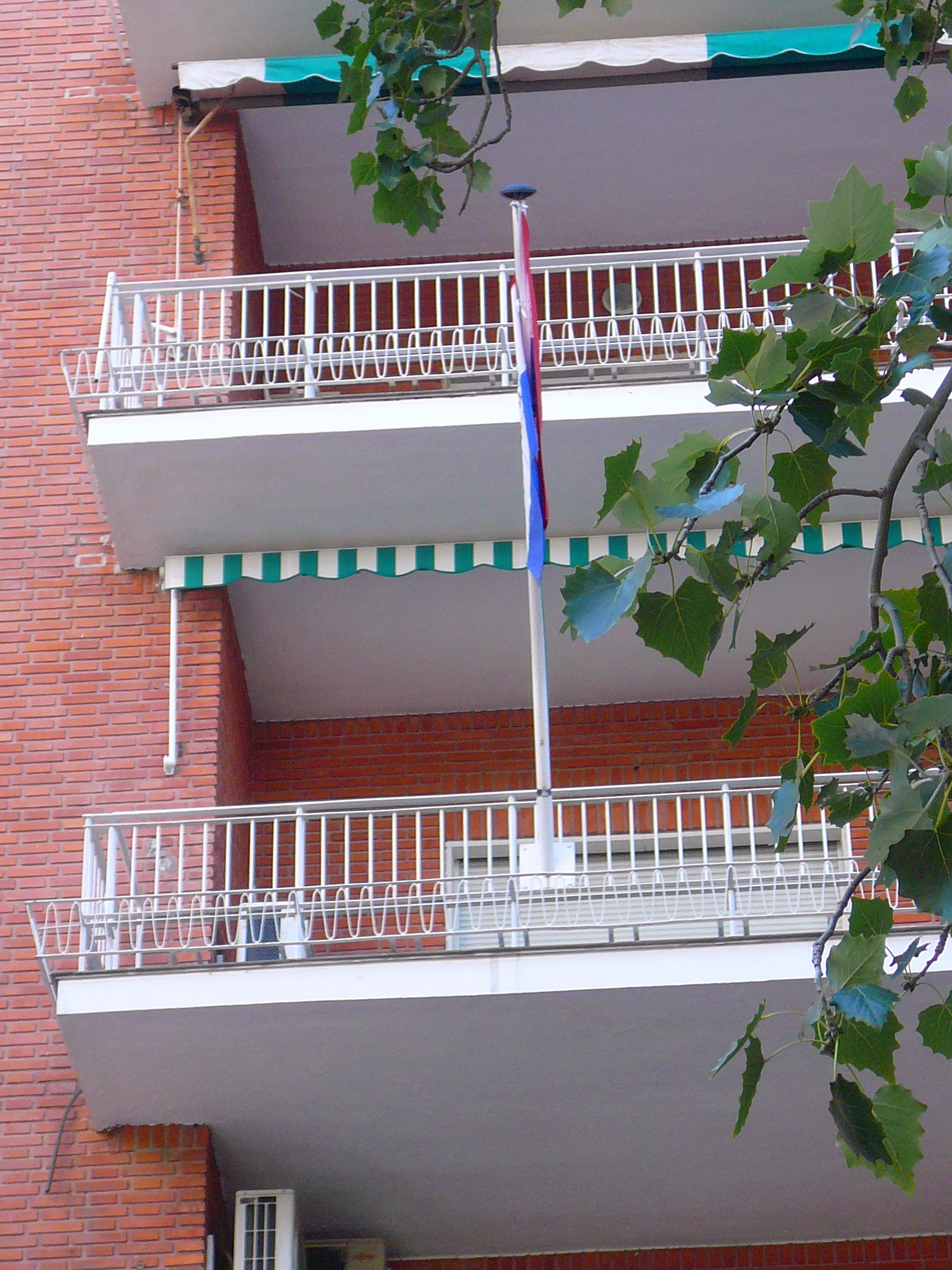
Embassy in Madrid

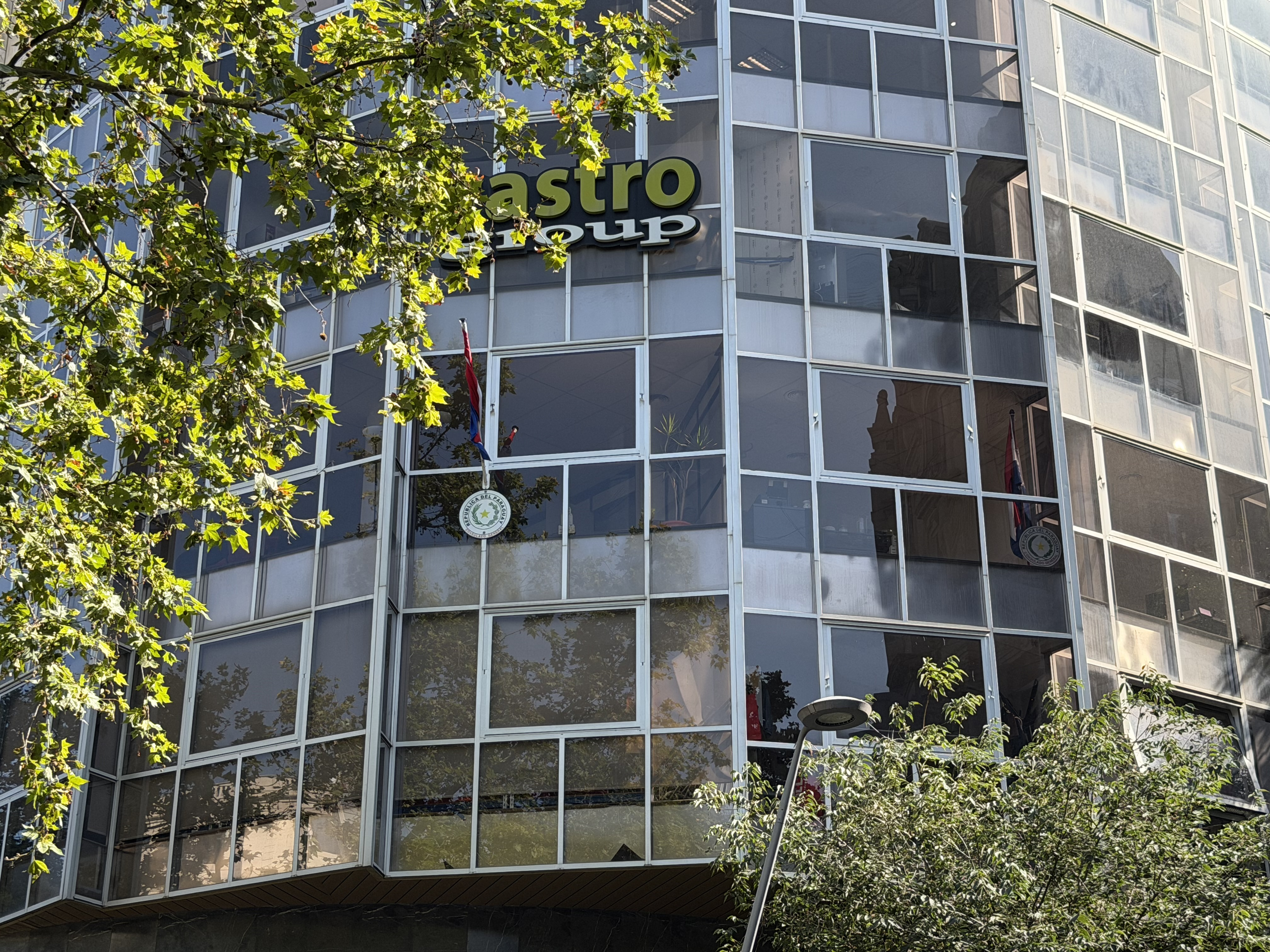
Consulate-General in Barcelona

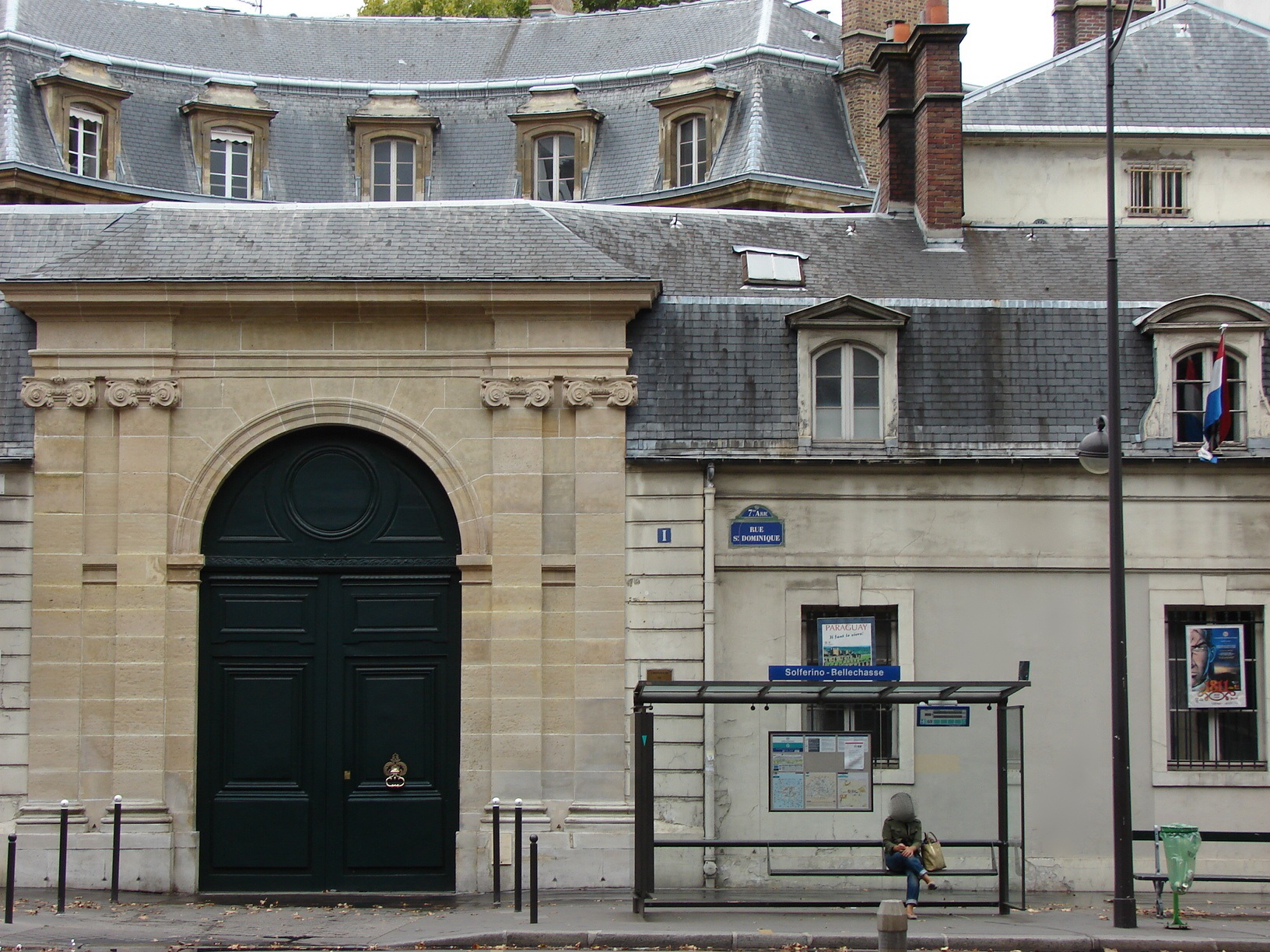
Embassy in Paris

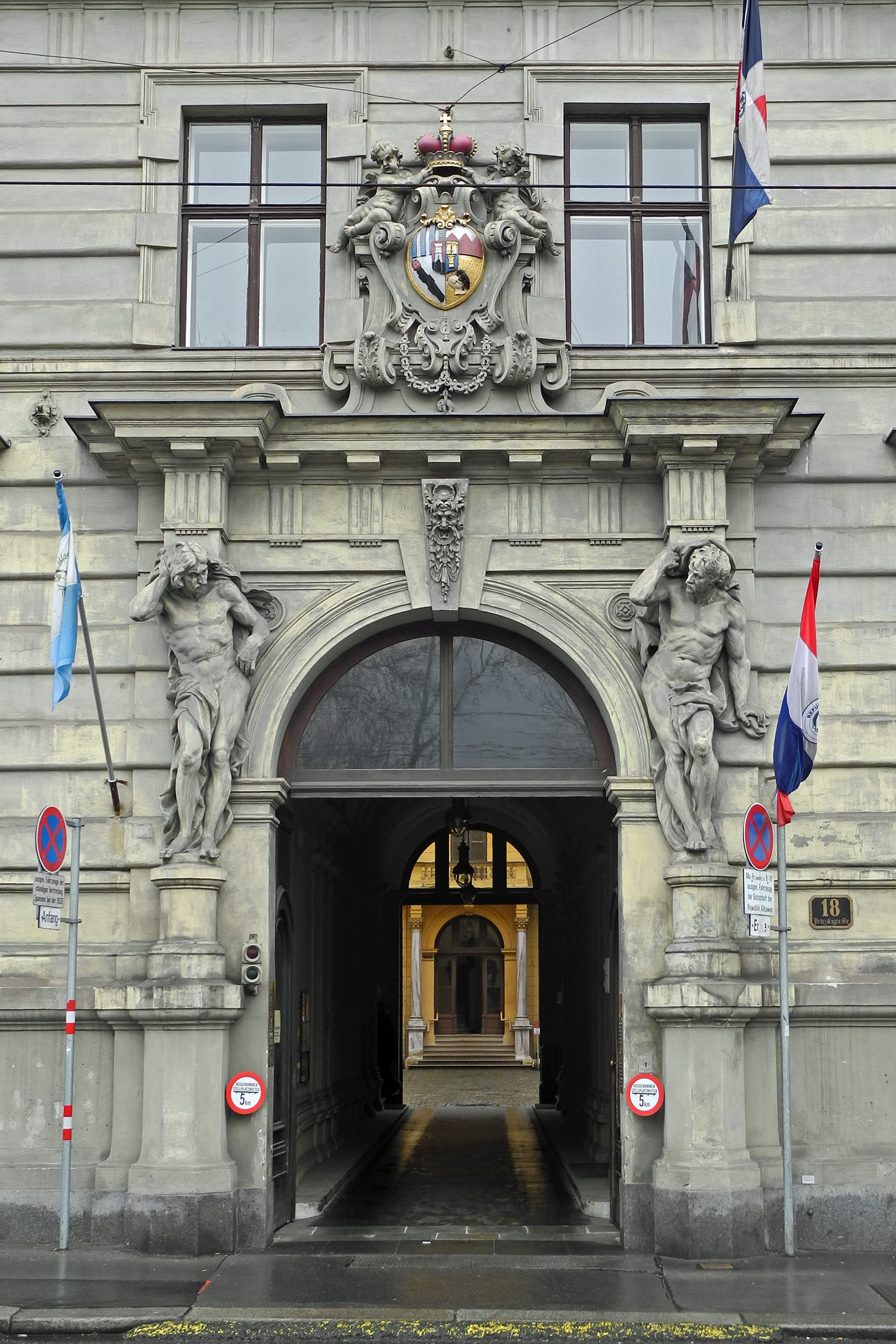
Embassy in Vienna

=== Oceania ===
Host country	Host city	Mission	Ref.
Australia	Sydney	Consulate-General	

=== Multilateral organisations ===
Organization	Host city	Host country	Mission	Concurrent accreditation	Ref.
ALADI	Montevideo	Uruguay	Permanent Mission	International Organizations: Mercosur	
Organization of American States	Washington, D.C.	United States	Permanent Mission	Countries: Antigua and Barbuda; Bahamas; Barbados; Belize; Dominica; Grenada; Haiti; Jamaica; Saint Kitts and Nevis; Saint Lucia; Saint Vincent and the Grenadines; Trinidad and Tobago	
United Nations	New York City	United States	Permanent Mission		
United Nations	Geneva	Switzerland	Permanent Mission	International Organizations: World Trade Organization	
UNESCO	Paris	France	Permanent Delegation		

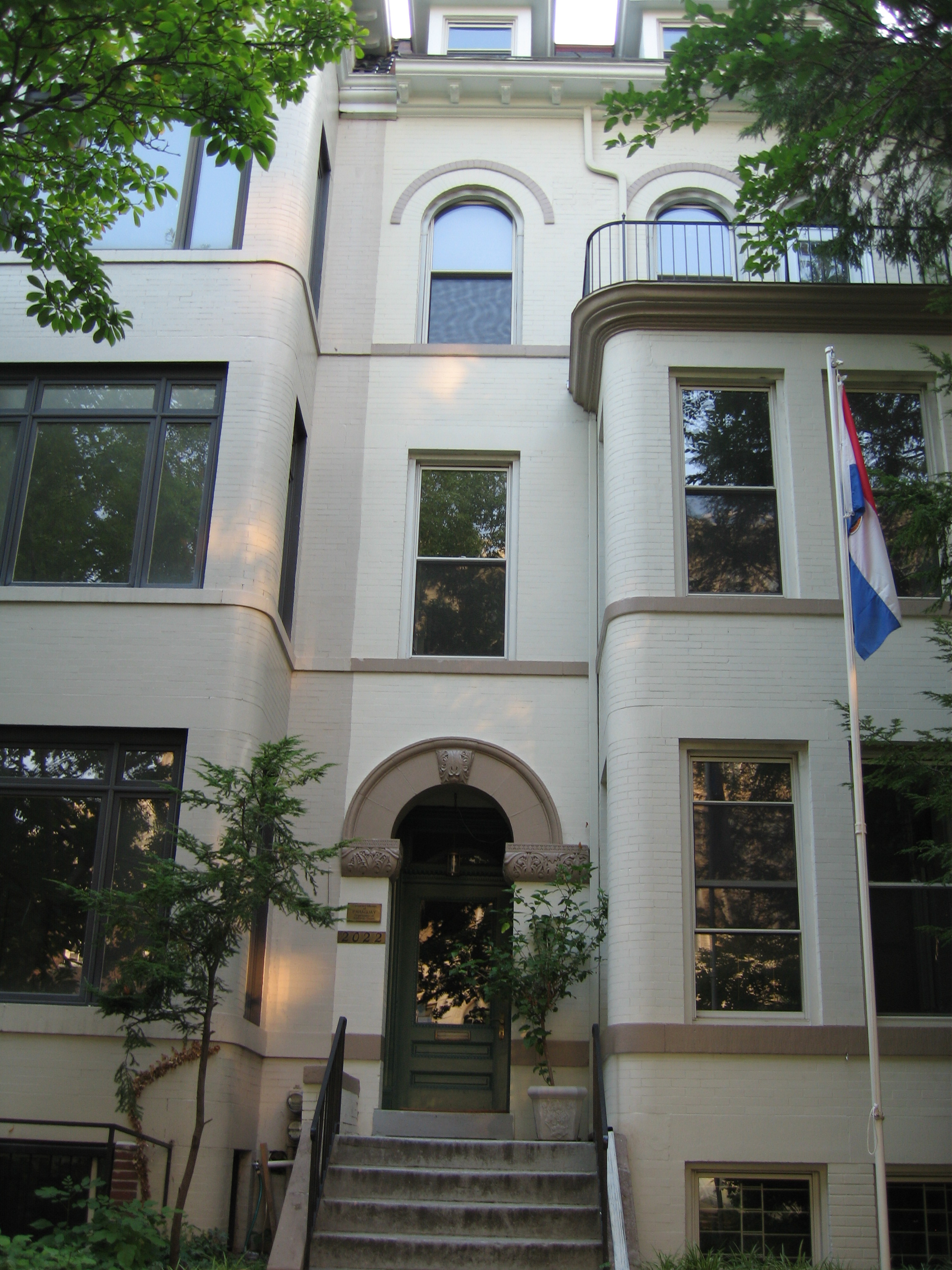
Permanent Mission to the OAS in Washington, D.C.

== Closed missions ==
=== Africa ===
Host country	Host city	Mission	Year closed	Ref.
Egypt	Cairo	Embassy (Note: Resident in Doha, Qatar)	2024	

=== Asia ===
Host country	Host city	Mission	Year closed	Ref.
Indonesia	Jakarta	Embassy (Note: Resident in Tokyo, Japan)	2014	

=== Americas ===
Host country	Host city	Mission	Year closed	Ref.
Argentina	Córdoba	Consulate	2024	
Argentina	Corrientes	Consulate	2024	
Argentina	Mendoza	Consulate	2024	
Argentina	Neuquén	Consulate	2024	
Bolivia	Villamontes	Consulate	2024	
Brazil	Campo Grande	Consulate-General	2024	
Brazil	Paranaguá	Consulate	2018	
Brazil	Porto Alegre	Consulate-General	2024	
Brazil	Santos	Consulate	Unknown	
Canada	Ottawa	Embassy (Note: Resident in Washington, D.C., United States)	2025	
Venezuela	Caracas	Embassy (Note: Resident in Panama City, Panama)	2019	

=== Europe ===
Host country	Host city	Mission	Year closed	Ref.
Portugal	Lisbon	Embassy (Note: Resident in Brussels, Belgium)	2024	
Sweden	Stockholm	Embassy (Note: Resident in Paris, France)	2020	
Switzerland	Bern	Embassy	2024	

=== Oceania ===
Host country	Host city	Mission	Year closed	Ref.
Australia	Canberra	Embassy (Note: Resident in Tokyo, Japan)	2024	

== See also ==
- List of diplomatic missions in Paraguay
- Foreign relations of Paraguay
- Visa policy of Paraguay
