= Paraguayan nationality law =

Paraguayan Citizenship Act

Parliament of Paraguay
- Long title: An Act relating to Paraguayan citizenship
- Enacted by: Government of Paraguay
- Status: Current legislation

Paraguayan nationality law is based on the principle of Jus soli. The nationality law is based on the Chapter 3 of the Paraguayan Constitution of 1992. The legal means to acquire nationality, formal membership in a nation, differ from the relationship of rights and obligations between a national and the nation, known as citizenship.

== Birth in Paraguay ==
Any person born in Paraguay acquires Paraguayan nationality at birth. The only exception applies to children of persons in the service of a foreign government (like foreign diplomats).

== Naturalization ==
Foreigners may apply for Paraguayan nationality if they meet the following criteria:

- being older than 18 years old.
- temporary residence for 2 years and then permanent residence for 3 years in Paraguay.
- having a good behavior following the law.
- make a financial investment in the country or hold a steady job

Passports of naturalized Paraguayans list nationality as "naturalized Paraguayan" instead of just "Paraguayan".

== Dual Nationality ==
Dual nationality is permitted under the constitution of Paraguay on a reciprocity basis, meaning that unless Paraguay has a bilateral agreement with another nation, that other nationality is not permitted. As of 2022, the only countries that have a reciprocity agreement in regards to dual nationality with Paraguay are Spain and Italy.

== Loss of nationality ==
In Paraguay, there is a distinction for loss of nationality between nationals born in Paraguay and those who have been naturalized. In the latter category, naturalizing in another country or being expatriated from the country for more than three years without permission, results in loss of nationality, as provided in Article 150 of the National Constitution of Paraguay, and proceedings thereunder must be instituted by an individual or an agency, for instance, the Migration department.
