= Cédula de identidad =

Identity document in Latin American countries

A cédula de identidad (Spanish), also known as cédula de ciudadanía or Documento de identidad (DNI), is a national identity document in many countries in Central and South America. In certain countries, such as Costa Rica, a cédula de identidad is the only valid identity document that can be used for certain circumstances, for example, opening a bank account as a driving license or passport is not valid. The term "cédula" may also colloquially refer to the number on the identity document.

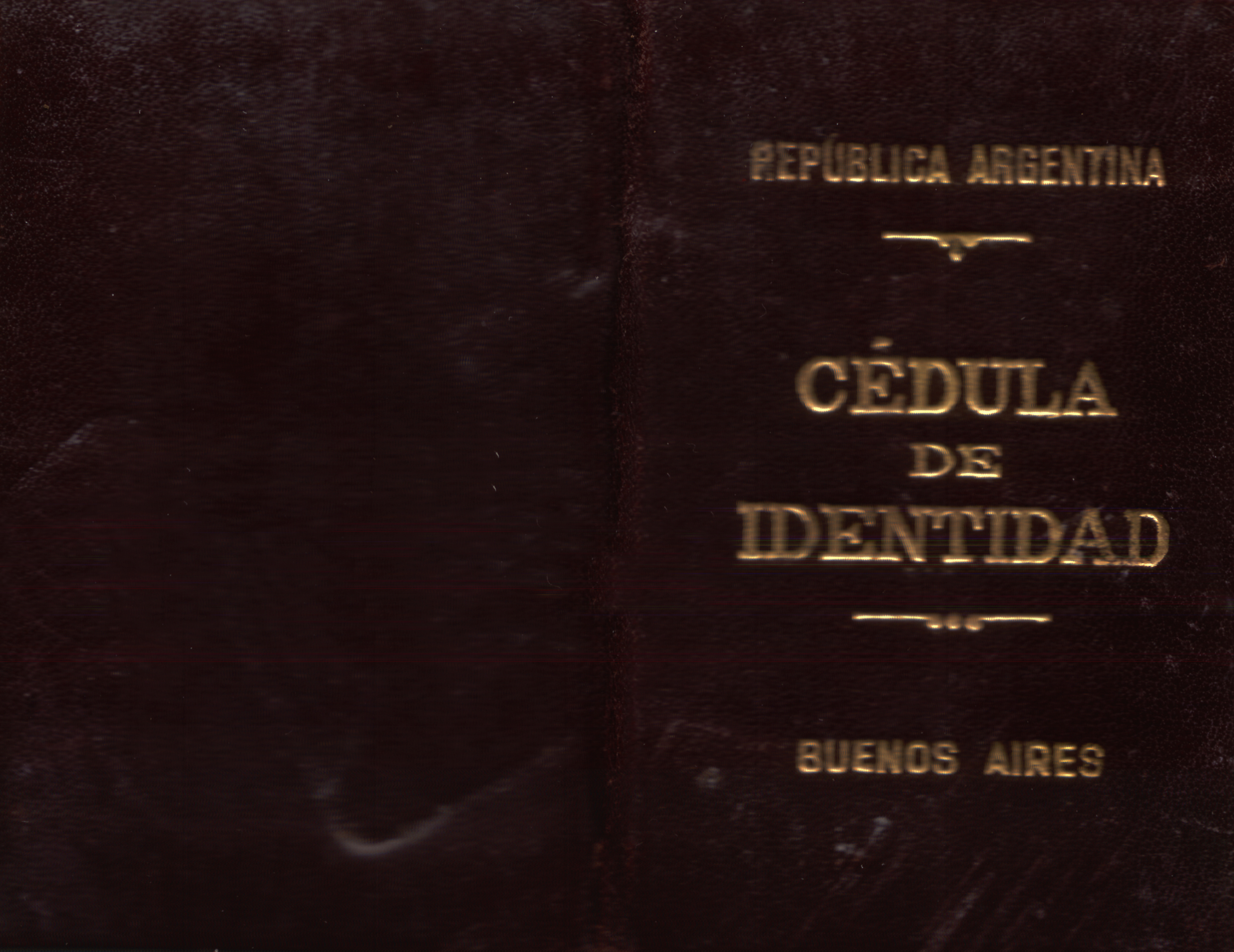
Cédula de identidad, Buenos Aires (1934)

The term cedula (Latin) means, in general, an order or authorization; in earlier times such a document on the authority of a king, or a royal decree, which for Spain and Spanish America was a decree issued directly by the monarch. A cedula may take the form of a brief authenticating text concerning an attached relic, such as the cedulae in reliquary pockets of the Ottonian Cross of Mathilde in the treasury of Essen Cathedral.

== Central America ==
In Central America, the cédula de identidad is valid for border crossings between three Central American countries: Guatemala, Honduras, and El Salvador.

=== Costa Rica ===
In Costa Rica, in recent years, a cédula de identidad, has been a credit card-sized plastic card. On one side, it includes a photo of the person, a personal identification number, and the card's owner personal information (complete name, gender, birth date, and others), and the user's signature. On the reverse, it may include additional information such as the date when the ID card was granted, expiration date of the ID card, and other such as their fingerprints, and all the owner's information in PDF417 code. The cards may include several security measures, including the use of ultraviolet coating. In the near future in Costa Rica, the cédulas de identidad will also be used in the digital signature process.

The cédula is required for nearly all bureaucratic procedures such as voting and receiving healthcare at a state-funded hospital or clinic. The cédula is acquired upon a citizen's 18th birthday, though an ID card for minors is available.

=== Guatemala ===
In Guatemala, the national ID is called DPI (Documento Personal de Identificación / Personal Identification Document) and is mandatory for anyone 18 or older to have, although no penalty exists for not having one. It is a credit-card–sized electronic ID card required for everything from opening a bank account to paying taxes to receiving Social Insurance.

== See also ==
- Identity document
- List of identity card policies by country
- Community Tax Certificate (Philippines)
