= Foreign relations of Colombia =

Colombia seeks diplomatic and commercial relations with all countries, regardless of their ideologies or political or economic systems. For this reason, the Colombian economy is quite open, relying on international trade and following guidelines given by international law.

Since 2008, Colombia's Ministry of Trade and Commerce has either reached or strengthened Bilateral Trade Agreements with South Korea, Japan and China building stronger commerce interchange and development in the Pacific Rim.

Regional relations have also vastly improved under the Santos Administration (2010–2018). Issues however remain regarding spillover of the FARC leftist-terrorist group, being chased out of hiding in rural areas of Colombia and finding safe havens in non-monitored areas of bordering states. The FARC numbers have significantly diminished in the last decade, to an estimated 5,000–7,000. And while joint military collaboration has steadily increased with the bordering countries of Brazil, Panama, Peru, and Venezuela, there have been tensions between Colombia and Ecuador regarding the issue. In 2002, the Ecuadorian government closed its main border crossing with Colombia, restricting its hours of operation. Ecuador continues to voice its concerns over an influx of émigrés stemming from guerilla activity at its borders. Evidence has since emerged however, suggesting that a significant number of the FARC's foot soldiers in and around the Colombia–Ecuador border consist of Ecuadorian émigrés who joined the leftist terrorist group out of need. Returning Ecuadorian émigrés have faced re-entry restrictions.

In 2012, relations with Nicaragua and Venezuela were tested over territorial island disputes. Bilateral committees are negotiating the dispute with Venezuela over waters in the Gulf of Venezuela.

== Background ==
In 1969, Colombia formed what is now the Andean Community along with Bolivia, Chile, Ecuador, and Peru (Venezuela joined in 1973, and Chile left in 1976).

In the 1980s, Colombia broadened its bilateral and multilateral relations, joining the Contadora Group, the Group of Eight (now the Rio Group), and the Non-Aligned Movement, which it chaired from 1994 until September 1998. In addition, it has signed free trade agreements with Chile, Mexico, and Venezuela.

Colombia has traditionally played an active role in the United Nations and the Organization of American States and in their subsidiary agencies. Former President César Gaviria became Secretary General of the OAS in September 1994 and was reelected in 1999. Colombia was a participant in the December 1994 and April 1998 Summits of the Americas and followed up on initiatives developed at the summit by hosting two post-summit, ministerial-level meetings on trade and science and technology.

Colombia regularly participates in international fora, including CICAD, the Organization of American States' body on money laundering, chemical controls, and drug abuse prevention. Although the Colombian Government ratified the 1988 UN Convention on Narcotics in 1994—the last of the Andean governments to do so—it took important reservations, notably to the anti-money-laundering measures, asset forfeiture and confiscation provisions, maritime interdiction, and extradition clauses. Colombia subsequently withdrew some of its reservations, most notably a reservation on extradition.

== International relations ==
=== Disputes – international ===
Maritime boundary dispute with Venezuela in the Gulf of Venezuela; territorial disputes with Nicaragua over Archipelago de San Andrés y Providencia and Quita Sueño Bank. The United States disputes sovereignty with Colombia over the Serranilla Bank and the Bajo Nuevo Bank. Quita Sueño Bank is claimed by the United States to be a submerged reef, and thus does not recognize the sovereignty of any nation over the bank.

=== Membership of international organizations ===
The major organizations in which Colombia is a member include: the Agency for the Prohibition of Nuclear Weapons in Latin America and the Caribbean, Andean Pact, Caribbean Development Bank Economic Commission for Latin America and the Caribbean, Food and Agriculture Organization of the United Nations, G3 Free Trade Agreement, Group of 11, Group of 24, Group of 77, Inter-American Development Bank, International Atomic Energy Agency, International Bank for Reconstruction and Development, International Chamber of Commerce, International Civil Aviation Organization, International Criminal Police Organization (Interpol), International Development Association, International Finance Corporation, International Fund for Agricultural Development, International Labour Organization, International Maritime Organization, International Maritime Satellite Organization, International Monetary Fund (IMF), International Olympic Committee, International Organization for Migration, International Organization for Standardization, International Telecommunication Union, International Telecommunications Satellite Organization, International Trade Union Confederation, Latin American Economic System, Latin American Integration Association, Non-Aligned Movement, Organization of American States (OAS), Permanent Court of Arbitration, Rio Group, United Nations (UN), UN Conference on Trade and Development, UNESCO, UN Industrial Development Organization, UN Office of the High Commissioner for Refugees, Universal Postal Union, World Confederation of Labour, World Federation of Trade Unions, World Health Organization, World Intellectual Property Organization, World Meteorological Organization, World Tourism Organization, and World Trade Organization. An OAS observer has monitored the government's peace process with the paramilitaries, lending the negotiations much-needed international credibility. The United States helps Colombia secure favorable treatment from the IMF.

=== Major international treaties ===
Regional treaties include the Andean Pact, now known as the Andean Community, which also includes Bolivia, Ecuador, and Peru, the bodies and institutions making up the Andean Integration System (AIS). Colombia has signed free-trade agreements with Chile, Mexico, and Venezuela.

Its recent trade agreements with Korea, China and Japan, have focused on economic and technical cooperation between those nations. Within the regional Caribbean Community and Common Market (Caricom), Colombia has also deepened economic and medical science research collaboration agreements. Colombia has also signed and ratified 105 international treaties or agreements relating to the protection of the environment. These include the Antarctic Treaty and Nuclear Test Ban Treaty and conventions on Biodiversity, Desertification, Endangered Species, Hazardous Wastes, Marine Life Conservation, Ozone Layer Protection, Ship Pollution, Tropical Timber 83, Tropical Timber 94, and Wetlands. It has signed, but not ratified, the Antarctic-Environmental Protocol and conventions on Law of the Sea and Marine Dumping. Colombia also has signed the Treaty on the Non-Proliferation of Nuclear Weapons and the Tlatelolco Treaty. By 1975 signatories to the 1974 Declaration of Ayacucho, of which Colombia was one, had decided on limitations to nuclear, biological, and chemical weapons.

Gaining all 186 votes, Colombia served on the U.N. Security Council from 2011 to 2012 representing Latin American and the Caribbean.

Colombia is also a member of the International Criminal Court with a Bilateral Immunity Agreement of protection for the United States-military (as covered under Article 98).

=== Domestic politics and foreign policy ===
International Relations scholars long emphasized international constraints, and particularly Colombia's relationship with the United States, as central to its foreign policy. In terms of foreign policy process, presidents have broad constitutional authorities, in consultation with their foreign ministers. However, since the 2000s, the influence of other domestic actors in Colombian foreign policy-making has increased. Long, Bitar, and Jiménez-Peña examine the role of the Colombian Constitutional Court, congressional politics, social movements, and electoral challengers. They find that Colombian institutions permit increasing challenges to presidential authority, and that in important cases Colombian presidents have been forced to drop their preferred foreign policies.

== Diplomatic relations ==
List of countries which Colombia maintains diplomatic relations with:

#	Country	Date
1	United States	19 June 1822
2	Peru	6 July 1822
3	Chile	21 October 1822
4	Argentina	8 March 1823
5	Mexico	3 October 1823
6	Guatemala	8 March 1825
7	El Salvador	8 March 1825
8	Honduras	8 March 1825
9	Nicaragua	8 March 1825
10	United Kingdom	18 April 1825
11	Netherlands	1 May 1829
12	Venezuela	27 November 1831
13	Ecuador	10 February 1832
—	Holy See	26 November 1835
14	Costa Rica	11 June 1856
15	Portugal	9 April 1857
16	Italy	13 March 1864
17	Paraguay	27 July 1870
18	Belgium	20 June 1871
19	Sweden	11 December 1874
20	Spain	30 January 1881
21	Uruguay	25 August 1888
22	France	30 May 1892
23	Cuba	1902
24	Brazil	24 April 1907
25	Switzerland	14 March 1908
26	Japan	25 May 1908
27	Bolivia	19 March 1912
28	Austria	10 January 1920
29	Panama	9 July 1924
30	Denmark	18 May 1931
31	Poland	18 November 1933
32	Czech Republic	17 April 1934
33	Russia	25 June 1935
34	Norway	6 September 1935
35	Dominican Republic	18 July 1936
36	Haiti	7 August 1936
37	Ethiopia	1 January 1937
38	Greece	1 January 1942
39	Philippines	1 January 1946
40	Lebanon	14 June 1949
41	Canada	6 October 1952
42	Germany	13 January 1953
—	Sovereign Military Order of Malta	28 January 1953
43	Finland	26 May 1954
44	Egypt	23 January 1957
45	Israel	1 July 1957
46	Turkey	10 April 1959
47	India	19 January 1959
48	South Korea	10 March 1962
49	Kuwait	26 December 1964
50	Ivory Coast	22 February 1965
51	Rwanda	22 February 1965
52	Jamaica	24 February 1965
53	Cyprus	11 February 1966
54	Serbia	December 1966
55	Romania	15 November 1967
56	Trinidad and Tobago	22 February 1968
57	Pakistan	19 June 1970
58	Guyana	18 December 1970
59	Luxembourg	21 April 1971
60	Barbados	1 February 1972
61	Cambodia	16 December 1972
62	Hungary	28 March 1973
63	Bulgaria	8 May 1973
64	Australia	9 January 1975
65	Kenya	27 January 1975
—	Iran (suspended)	28 April 1975
66	United Arab Emirates	1 January 1976
67	Bahamas	16 August 1977
68	New Zealand	1 May 1978
69	Suriname	22 June 1978
70	Algeria	1 January 1979
71	Iraq	1 January 1979
72	Morocco	1 January 1979
73	Nigeria	1 January 1979
74	Vietnam	1 January 1979
75	Thailand	22 January 1979
76	Albania	5 December 1979
77	China	7 February 1980
78	Indonesia	15 September 1980
79	Dominica	9 December 1980
80	Grenada	9 January 1981
81	Tunisia	20 January 1981
82	Saint Vincent and the Grenadines	17 March 1981
83	Equatorial Guinea	6 May 1981
84	Gabon	14 July 1981
85	Senegal	1 August 1981
86	Iceland	11 September 1981
87	Tanzania	28 October 1981
88	Belize	15 February 1982
89	Antigua and Barbuda	18 March 1982
90	Saint Lucia	18 March 1982
91	Jordan	22 October 1982
92	Singapore	15 December 1982
93	Saint Kitts and Nevis	1 January 1984
94	Bangladesh	14 February 1984
95	Oman	1 August 1985
96	Malta	16 April 1986
97	Nepal	6 May 1987
98	Mauritania	1 July 1987
99	Cape Verde	27 July 1987
100	Malaysia	19 August 1987
101	Fiji	10 September 1987
102	Samoa	1 December 1987
103	Papua New Guinea	2 March 1988
104	Zambia	21 April 1988
105	Angola	29 April 1988
106	Mozambique	10 May 1988
107	Syria	24 May 1988
108	Ghana	23 June 1988
109	Seychelles	5 August 1988
110	Mongolia	8 August 1988
111	São Tomé and Príncipe	12 August 1988
112	Maldives	14 August 1988
113	Burkina Faso	27 September 1988
114	Liberia	28 September 1988
115	Chad	29 September 1988
116	Djibouti	29 September 1988
117	Mali	29 September 1988
118	Togo	29 September 1988
119	Guinea	30 September 1988
120	Laos	30 September 1988
121	Mauritius	30 September 1988
122	Sri Lanka	30 September 1988
123	Central African Republic	3 October 1988
124	Comoros	3 October 1988
125	Gambia	3 October 1988
126	Somalia	3 October 1988
127	Sudan	3 October 1988
128	Yemen	3 October 1988
129	Niger	5 October 1988
130	Zimbabwe	10 October 1988
131	North Korea	24 October 1988
132	Burundi	11 November 1988
133	Sierra Leone	16 November 1988
134	Myanmar	22 November 1988
135	Benin	30 November 1988
136	Cameroon	8 March 1989
137	Guinea-Bissau	23 March 1989
138	Bahrain	18 April 1989
139	Uganda	5 May 1989
140	Botswana	25 April 1990
141	Namibia	28 April 1990
142	Afghanistan	3 August 1990
143	Brunei	24 March 1992
144	Kazakhstan	23 July 1992
145	Marshall Islands	5 August 1992
146	Ukraine	20 August 1992
147	Federated States of Micronesia	8 September 1992
148	Belarus	9 December 1992
149	Slovakia	1 January 1993
150	Lithuania	5 August 1993
151	Kyrgyzstan	6 October 1993
152	Estonia	23 March 1994
153	South Africa	12 April 1994
154	Slovenia	19 July 1994
155	Azerbaijan	13 December 1994
156	Armenia	22 December 1994
157	Eritrea	22 December 1994
158	Croatia	25 April 1995
159	Qatar	9 May 1995
160	Madagascar	15 June 1995
161	Latvia	19 July 1995
162	Bosnia and Herzegovina	19 October 1995
163	Andorra	27 November 1995
164	Libya	16 May 1996
165	Turkmenistan	27 August 1996
166	Georgia	6 June 1997
167	Moldova	14 October 1997
168	Malawi	30 March 1998
169	Lesotho	17 April 1998
170	Republic of the Congo	1 July 1999
171	Ireland	10 November 1999
172	North Macedonia	22 June 2000
173	Monaco	15 December 2000
174	Liechtenstein	24 October 2001
175	San Marino	15 April 2002
176	Timor-Leste	20 May 2002
177	Montenegro	12 August 2011
178	Saudi Arabia	8 September 2011
179	Tuvalu	3 April 2012
180	Uzbekistan	2 October 2012
181	Tajikistan	5 October 2012
182	Bhutan	21 December 2012
—	State of Palestine	6 August 2018
—	Kosovo	3 March 2019
183	Solomon Islands	23 September 2024

== Bilateral relations ==
=== Americas ===
Country	Formal relations began	Notes
Argentina	8 March 1823	See Argentina–Colombia relations: Argentina has an embassy in Bogotá.; Colombia has an embassy in Buenos Aires.; Both countries are full members of the Organization of American States, Latin American Economic System, Latin American Integration Association, Rio Group and Union of South American Nations.; (in Spanish) List of Treaties ruling the relations Argentina and Colombia (Argentine Foreign Ministry
Bolivia	19 March 1912	See Bolivia–Colombia relations: Bolivia has an embassy in Bogotá.; Colombia has an embassy in La Paz.
Brazil	24 April 1907	See Brazil–Colombia relations: Brazil has an embassy in Bogotá and a vice-consulate in Leticia.; Colombia has an embassy in Brasília and consulates-general in Manaus, São Paulo and in Tabatinga.
Canada	6 October 1952	See Canada–Colombia relations: Canada has an embassy in Bogotá.; Colombia has an embassy in Ottawa and consulates-general in Calgary, Montreal, Toronto and Vancouver.
Chile	21 October 1822	See Chile–Colombia relations Both nations are members of the Pacific Alliance.: Chile has an embassy in Bogotá.; Colombia has an embassy in Santiago.; Signed in November 2006 following negotiations initiated by Chilean President Michelle Bachelet, the Chile–Colombia FTA incorporated services, investments, and government procurement (Chile's first in South America to cover public procurement).
Ecuador	10 February 1832	See Colombia–Ecuador relations Present-day Colombia and Ecuador trace back established official diplomatic relations to December, 1831 with the signing of the Treaty of Pasto, in which both countries recognized each other as sovereign states. The Ecuadorean diplomatic mission in New Granada (Colombia) did not open until 1837. It wasn't until 1939 that Ecuador raised the diplomatic mission's status to an official embassy. Colombia did the same the following year, in 1940.: Colombia has an embassy in Quito.; Ecuador has an embassy in Bogotá.
Guyana	18 December 1970	See Colombia–Guyana relations: Both countries have established diplomatic relations on 18 December 1970.; Both countries are full members of Organization of American States, Association of Caribbean States and Union of South American Nations.; Colombia is accredited to Guyana from its embassy in Port of Spain, Trinidad and Tobago.; Guyana is accredited to Colombia from its embassy in Caracas, Venezuela.
Honduras	19 April 1852	See Colombia-Honduras relations
Mexico	3 October 1823	See Colombia–Mexico relations: Colombia has an embassy in Mexico City and consulates in Cancún and Guadalajara.; Mexico has an embassy in Bogotá.; Both countries are full members of the Organization of American States and the Pacific Alliance.
Nicaragua	8 March 1825	See Colombia–Nicaragua relations The relationship between the two Latin American countries has evolved amid conflicts over the San Andrés y Providencia Islands located in the Caribbean close to the Nicaraguan shoreline and the maritime boundaries covering 150,000 km^{2} (57,915 sq mi) that included the islands of San Andrés, Providencia and Santa Catalina and the banks of Roncador, Serrana, Serranilla and Quitasueño as well as the arbitrarily designed 82nd meridian west which Colombia claims as a border but which the International Court has sided with Nicaragua in disavowing.: Colombia has an embassy in Managua.; Nicaragua has an embassy in Bogotá.
Panama	9 July 1924	See Colombia–Panama relations: Colombia has an embassy in Panama City and consulates in Colón, Jaqué and in Puerto Obaldía.; Panama has an embassy in Bogotá and a consulate-general in Barranquilla.
Paraguay	27 July 1870	See Colombia–Paraguay relations: Colombia has an embassy in Asunción.; Paraguay has an embassy in Bogotá.; Both countries are full members of Union of South American Nations, Organization of American States, Organization of Ibero-American States, Rio Group, Group of 77, Latin American Economic System and Latin American Integration Association.; Paraguayan Ministry of Foreign Relations about relations with Colombia
Peru	6 July 1822	See Colombia–Peru relations Both nations are members of the Pacific Alliance.: Colombia has an embassy in Lima and a consulate-general in Iquitos.; Peru has an embassy in Bogotá and a consulate-general in Leticia.; In 2024, bilateral trade between Colombia and Peru totaled approximately $2.09 billion, with Colombian exports to Peru reaching $1.17 billion and imports totaling $920 million, generating a $249 million trade surplus for Colombia.
United States	19 June 1822	See Colombia–United States relations The country traditionally has had good relations with the United States. Relations were strained during the presidency of Ernesto Samper (1994–98) due to accusations of receiving illegal campaign funding from the Cali Cartel. Relations between the two countries greatly improved during the Pastrana administration (1998–2002). In January 2000, the Clinton administration pledged more than US$1 billion of mainly military assistance to Colombia to assist the antidrug component of President Pastrana's strategy known as Plan Colombia. Relations with the United States became a foreign policy priority for the Uribe administration, and Colombia became an important ally in the "war on terrorism". In March 2002, in response to a request from U.S. President George W. Bush, the U.S. Congress lifted restrictions on U.S. assistance to Colombia to allow it to be used for counterinsurgency in addition to antidrug operations. U.S. support for Colombia's antidrug-trafficking efforts included slightly more than US$2.5 billion between 2000 and 2004, as compared with only about US$300 million in 1998. Some critics of current US policies in Colombia, such as Law Professor John Barry, claim that US influences have catalyzed internal conflicts. Colombia rejects threats and blackmail of the United States of America after the threat of Donald Trump to decertify the country as a partner in counter-narcotics efforts. For more than 30 years Colombia has demonstrated its commitment – paying a very high cost in human lives – with overcoming the drug problem. This commitment stems from the profound conviction that the consumption, production and trafficking of drugs constitute a serious threat to the well-being and security of citizens. Colombia is undoubtedly the country that has fought the most drugs and with more successes on this front. No one has to threaten us to meet this challenge. — Colombia’s National Government The problem of drugs is global. Overcoming it can only be achieved through cooperation and under the principle of joint responsibility. Consumer countries’ authorities have a fundamental responsibility to their fellow citizens and the world to reduce consumption and to attack trafficking and distribution organizations in their own countries. — Colombia’s National Government Latin America rejects Trump's military threat against Venezuela. Brazil, Colombia and other countries in the region prefer to play a constructive role that would prevent a civil war in Venezuela. Colombia's Foreign Ministry said that all efforts to resolve Venezuela's crisis should be peaceful. Colombia proposed the idea of the Sustainable Development Goals and a final document was adopted by the United Nations.: Colombia has an embassy in Washington, D.C., and consulates-general in Atlanta, Boston, Chicago, Houston, Los Angeles, Miami, Newark, New York, Orlando, San Francisco and in San Juan, Puerto Rico.; United States has an embassy in Bogotá.
Uruguay	25 August 1888	See Colombia–Uruguay relations: Colombia has an embassy in Montevideo.; Uruguay has an embassy in Bogotá.; Both countries are full members of the Community of Latin American and Caribbean States (CELAC), the Latin American Integration Association (ALADI) and the Organization of American States (OAS).
Venezuela	27 November 1831	See Colombia–Venezuela relations The relationship has developed since the early 16th century, when Spanish empire colonizers created the province of Santa Marta (now Colombia) and the province of New Andalucia (now Venezuela). The countries share a history for achieving their independence under Simón Bolívar and becoming one nation—the Gran Colombia—which dissolved in the 19th century. Following then, the overall relationship between the two countries has vacillated between cooperation and bilateral struggle. In February 2019, Venezuelan president Nicolás Maduro cut diplomatic relations with Colombia after Colombian President Ivan Duque helped Venezuelan opposition politicians deliver humanitarian aid to their country. Colombia recognized Venezuelan opposition leader Juan Guaido as the country's legitimate president. In January 2020, Colombia rejected Maduro's proposal that the two countries restore diplomatic relations. Following the election of Colombian President Gustavo Petro, the two countries restored diplomatic relations in August 2022.: Colombia has an embassy in Caracas and maintains several consulates throughout the country.; Venezuela has an embassy in Bogotá and maintains several consulates throughout the country.

=== Asia ===
Country	Formal Relations Began	Notes
Armenia	22 December 1994	Both countries established diplomatic relations on December 22, 1994.: Armenia is accredited to Colombia from its embassy in Brasília, Brazil.; Colombia is accredited to Armenia from its embassy in Moscow, Russia.
Azerbaijan	13 December 1994	See Azerbaijan–Colombia relations: Azerbaijan has an embassy in Bogotá.; Colombia has an embassy in Baku.
China	7 February 1980	See China–Colombia relations: China has an embassy in Bogotá.; Colombia has an embassy in Beijing and consulates-general in Guangzhou, Hong Kong and Shanghai.
India	19 January 1959	Main article: Colombia–India relations The relationship between the two countries has been gradually increasing with more frequent diplomatic visits to promote political, commercial cultural and academic exchanges. Colombia is currently the commercial point of entry into Latin America for Indian companies. In 2024, India recorded a $1.3 billion trade deficit with Colombia, with Indian exports totaling $1.41 billion and imports reaching $2.7 billion.: India has an embassy in Bogotá.; Colombia has an embassy in New Delhi.
Indonesia	15 September 1980	Main article: Colombia–Indonesia relations Both countries are members of the Non-Aligned Movement, the Pacific Economic Cooperation Council, the Cairns Group, and the CIVETS block.: Colombia has an embassy in Jakarta.; Indonesia has an embassy in Bogotá.
Israel	1 July 1957	Main article: Colombia–Israel relations In a 2019 article in the Israel Journal of Foreign Affairs, Marcos Peckel, a Colombian scholar noted that Colombian-Israeli relations can be looked through the lenses of military cooperation, trade links, education and culture, and recognition of Palestine. Militarily, Colombia was one of the first countries to receiveF Israel weapons and engage in arms deals, which became a long-term bilateral agreement. Since then, Israel and Colombia have shared intelligence, and as Peckel explains, several pieces of Israeli technology. In trade, both countries had a strong relationship. The Free Trade Agreement, a pending agreement between Colombia and Israel, has the potential to further strengthen these relationships by boosting Colombian imports in Israel and increasing the presence of Israeli technology in Colombia. Educational and cultural ties between Colombia and Israel were deeply interwoven through Israeli scholarships to Colombians and a presence of media in each country. Colombia supports the establishment of an independent Palestinian state alongside Israel within mutually agreed-upon borders. It considers Israeli settlements in the West Bank illegal but strongly condemns Palestinian terrorism, and it advocates for a lasting peace based on the two-state solution. On resolutions in the UN General Assembly that compared Zionism to racism and wanted to establish a right to return for Palestinians, Colombia abstained. In 2018, Colombia officially recognized the State of Palestine. Despite temporarily straining relations between the countries, the two re-established strong relations. On 1 May 2024, Colombian president Gustavo Petro announced Colombia broke diplomatic ties with Israel as a result of the Gaza war. In August 2026, Colombian president Abelardo de la Espriella, restored diplomatic relations with Israel. On 10 August 2026, Colombia officially recognized Israeli sovereignty over the Golan Heights.: Colombia has an embassy in Jerusalem.; Israel has an embassy in Bogotá.
Japan	25 May 1908	Main article: Colombia–Japan relations The relationship was officially established in 1908, only interrupted between 1942 and 1954 because of World War II. Relations are mostly based on commercial trade that has favored Japan interests, cultural exchanges and technological and philanthropic aid to Colombia.: Colombia has an embassy in Tokyo.; Japan has an embassy in Bogotá.
Malaysia	19 August 1987	Main article: Colombia–Malaysia relations Ambassador of Colombia in Malaysia also accredited to Vietnam, while Malaysian Embassy in Lima, Peru, accredited to Colombia. Both are members of United Nations, Movement of Non-Aligned Cooperation Forum Asia-Latin America (FEALAC) and Pacific Economic Cooperation Council (PECC).: Colombia has an embassy in Kuala Lumpur.; Malaysia is accredited to Colombia from its embassy in Lima, Peru.
Pakistan	19 June 1970	Both Pakistan and Colombia do not enjoy cordial dealings with some of their neighbours. Another common aspect that makes the task of both Colombian and Pakistan Armed forces even tougher is the difficult terrain they have been encountering. Poverty, income inequality, destruction and degradation of other vital organs of the state have consequently been the natural by-products of insubordination and rebellions in both Colombia and Pakistan. Both the countries have similar Gross Domestic Products (GDPs) too. While the Colombian Purchasing Power Parity GDP stands at $460.406 billion, Pakistan s GDP stands at $464.897 billion (latest IMF statistics). Like Colombia, Pakistan also witnesses a large presence of the US military personnel and civilian contractors on its territory. Colombia established diplomatic relations with Pakistan in 1980, but bilateral trade between the two countries was negligible which needed to be improved for the benefit of both nations.: Colombia is accredited to Pakistan from its embassy in Ankara, Turkey.; Pakistan is accredited to Colombia from its embassy in Brasília, Brazil.
Palestine	6 August 2018 (recognized)	See Embassy of Palestine, Bogotá
Philippines	1 January 1946	See Colombia–Philippines relations: Colombia has an embassy in Manila.; Philippines is accredited to Colombia from its embassy in Brasília, Brazil.
Saudi Arabia	8 September 2011	Colombia has an embassy in Riyadh.; Saudi Arabia has an embassy in Bogotá.; In 2024, bilateral trade between Saudi Arabia and Colombia was dominated by Colombia, whose primary exports to Saudi Arabia included coffee ($46.9M), other large iron pipes ($19.5M), and iron pipes ($18.9M), while receiving top imports of propylene polymers ($12.7M), acyclic hydrocarbons ($7.81M), and ethylene polymers ($6.68M) from Saudi Arabia.
South Korea	10 March 1962	See Colombia–South Korea relations: Formal diplomatic relations between South Korea and Colombia started on 10 March 1962.; Colombia sent about 1,000 men to Korea to assist South Korea during the Korean War.; Colombia has an embassy in Seoul.; South Korea has an embassy in Bogotá.; In 2024, bilateral trade between Colombia and South Korea reached over $2.1 billion, with Colombian exports to South Korea valued at $985 million and imports from South Korea totaling $1.2 billion, resulting in a $219 million trade surplus for South Korea.
Turkey	10 April 1959	See Colombia–Turkey relations: Colombia has an embassy in Ankara.; Turkey has an embassy in Bogotá.; Both countries are members of OECD and WTO.; Direct flights from Istanbul to Bogotá commenced in May 2016.; Trade volume between the two countries was US$1.7 billion USD in 2019 (Colombian exports/imports: 1.46/0.25 billion USD).
United Arab Emirates	28 April 1975	Colombia opened its embassy in Abu Dhabi in 2011; UAE opened its embassy in Bogotá in 2013; In April 2024, Colombia and the United Arab Emirates signed a Comprehensive Economic Partnership Agreement (CEPA) aimed at reducing trade barriers, promoting small and medium-sized enterprises (SMEs), and expanding bilateral cooperation in clean energy, food security and artificial intelligence.
Iran	28 April 1975	The Colombian embassy in Tehran was closed during the Iran–Iraq War (1980–1989) and reopened in April 1992, and closed again in early 2003.; Iran has an embassy in Bogotá.; Diplomatic relations with Iran severed on September 19, 2026.

=== Europe ===
Under the Uribe administration, Colombia's relations with the European Union (EU) have been cordial. Representatives of the EU have been critical of Colombia's antiguerrilla and antidrug strategies in several respects. The EU is particularly concerned about the potential for increased human rights abuses within Colombia at the hands of both government forces and illegal armed groups, and it has continued to distance itself from Plan Colombia. The EU is in favor of a negotiated solution to the nation's internal conflict. EU aid to Colombia has mainly consisted of social, economic and development investments.

In 2004, the EU as an entity did not offer unrestricted support for the Uribe government's peace initiative with paramilitaries, citing concerns over the possible lack of a credible and comprehensive peace strategy and its application, but it did approve US$2 million in aid for the process. Individual EU members such Sweden, Italy, Germany and the Netherlands also provided limited support on their own.

Country	Formal relations began	Notes
Andorra	27 November 1995	See Andorra–Colombia relations: Andorra does not have an accreditation to Colombia.; Colombia's embassy in Madrid, Spain is accredited to the Principality of Andorra.; In February 2013, Colombia's Foreign Minister at the time made an official visit to Andorra in order to strengthen relations between the two countries.
Austria	10 January 1920	See Austria–Colombia relations: Austria has an embassy in Bogotá.; Colombia has an embassy in Vienna.
Belarus	9 December 1992	On May 19, 1998, Colombia and Belarus signed a collaboration agreement between both countries.: Belarus is accredited to Colombia from its embassy in Quito, Ecuador.; Colombia is accredited to Belarus from its embassy in Moscow, Russia.
Belgium	1873	Belgium has an embassy in Bogotá.; Colombia has an embassy in Brussels
Czech Republic	January 1993	Colombia is accredited to the Czech Republic from its embassy in Vienna, Austria.; Czech Republic has an embassy in Bogotá.; The first connections between Czechia and Colombia occurred in the times of colonial era, during missionary activities of Jesuits in that area. In 1860/1870s the Czech botanist Benedikt Roezl discovered the cycad plant Zamia roezlii on the Pacific coast in Colombia. The plant is named after him. In 1922 began the consulary activities between Czechoslovakia and Colombia. Since 1926 the Colombian consul had his seat in Prague. In 1935 both countries agreed to interchange the ambassadors.; In 2008, during his visit in Colombia, the Czech Prime Minister Mirek Topolánek negotiated a possible sale of Aero L-159 Alca combat aircraft with Colombian President Álvaro Uribe.
France	30 May 1892	See Colombia–France relations Officially the relations between Colombian and France began on May 30, 1892, with the signature of an agreement intended to establish French nationals in Colombia, increase commerce and navigation between the two nations.: Colombia has an embassy in Paris.; France has an embassy in Bogotá.
Germany	1 June 1872	See Colombia–Germany relations: Colombia has an embassy in Berlin and a consulate-general in Frankfurt.; Germany has an embassy in Bogotá.
Hungary	28 March 1973	See Colombia–Hungary relations: Colombia has an embassy in Budapest.; Hungary has an embassy in Bogotá.
Iceland	11 September 1981	Colombia is accredited to Iceland from its embassy in Stockholm, Sweden.; Iceland is accredited to Colombia from its embassy in Ottawa, Canada.; Iceland and Colombia have a Free Trade Agreement through the EFTA
Ireland	10 November 1999	See Colombia–Ireland relations: Colombia has an embassy in Dublin.; Ireland has an embassy in Bogotá.
Italy	13 March 1864	See Colombia–Italy relations: Colombia has an embassy in Rome and a consulate-general in Milan.; Italy has an embassy in Bogotá.
Kosovo	3 March 2019	Colombia recognized Kosovo on August 6, 2008.; Both countries established diplomatic relations on 3 March 2019.; Kosovo will open an embassy in Bogotá.
Liechtenstein	24 October 2001	Colombia is accredited to Liechtenstein from its embassy in Bern, Switzerland.; Liechtenstein and Colombia have a Free Trade Agreement through the EFTA.
Monaco	15 December 2000	Colombia is accredited to Monaco from its embassy in Paris, France.; Monaco has an honorary consulate in Bogotá.; Colombia and Monaco first established diplomatic relations in December 2000. In 2012, Colombia's ambassador to France at the time, presented to Monaco its credentials becoming the first non-resident ambassador to the country.
Netherlands	1 May 1829	See Colombia–Netherlands relations On 16 and 17 February 2022 president Iván Duque visited the Netherlands. There were talks about trade and judicial cooperation. Also a bilateral treaty for the elimination of double taxation with respect to taxes on income and the prevention of tax evasion and avoidance was signed by Dutch PM Mark Rutte and president Duque.: Colombia has an embassy in The Hague, a consulate-general in Amsterdam, and consulates in Willemstad (Curaçao) and in Oranjestad (Aruba).; Netherlands has an embassy in Bogotá.
Poland	18 November 1933	See Colombia–Poland relations: Colombia has an embassy in Warsaw.; Poland has an embassy in Bogotá.
Portugal	9 April 1857	Colombia has an embassy in Lisbon.; Portugal has an embassy in Bogotá.
Russia	25 June 1935	See Colombia–Russia relations: Colombia has an embassy in Moscow.; Russia has an embassy in Bogotá.
Serbia	December 1966	Both countries established diplomatic relations in December 1966.; A number of bilateral agreements in various fields have been concluded and are in force between both countries.; Colombia is accredited to Serbia from its embassy in Vienna, Austria.; Serbia is accredited to Colombia from its embassy in Brasília, Brazil.
Spain	30 January 1881	See Colombia–Spain relations: Colombia has an embassy in Madrid; consulates-general in Barcelona and Seville and consulates in Bilbao, Las Palmas de Gran Canaria, Palma de Mallorca and Valencia.; Spain has an embassy in Bogotá.
Sweden	11 December 1874	See Colombia–Sweden relations: Colombia has an embassy in Stockholm.; Sweden has an embassy in Bogotá.
United Kingdom	18 April 1825	Main article: Colombia–United Kingdom relations Colombia established diplomatic relations with the United Kingdom on 18 April 1825.: Colombia maintains an embassy in London.; The United Kingdom is accredited to Colombia through its embassy in Bogotá.; Both countries share common membership of the International Criminal Court, the OECD, and the World Trade Organization, as well as the Andean countries–UK Free Trade Agreement. Bilaterally the two countries have a Cultural Agreement, a Double Taxation Agreement, an Investment Agreement, a Partnership for Sustainable Growth, and a Security Agreement.

=== Oceania ===
Country	Formal relations began	Notes
Australia	9 January 1975	See Australia–Colombia relations: Australia has an embassy in Bogotá.; Colombia has an embassy in Canberra and a consulate-general in Sydney.
New Zealand	1 May 1978	See Colombia–New Zealand relations: Colombia is accredited to New Zealand from its embassy in Canberra, Australia and maintains a consulate-general in Auckland.; New Zealand has an embassy in Bogotá.

=== Africa ===
Country	Formal relations began	Notes
Sahrawi Arab Democratic Republic	27 February 1984	Colombia and the Sahrawi Arab Democratic Republic maintained diplomatic relations between 27 February 1984 and 10 August 2026.

== Transnational issues ==
=== Narcotics and terrorism ===
By the 1990s, Colombia had become the world's leading supplier of refined cocaine and a growing source for heroin. More than 90% of the cocaine that entered in the United States in the 1990s was produced, processed, or transshipped in Colombia. The cultivation of coca dropped between 1995 and 1999 from 3,020 to 1,100 km^{2} (425 sq mi), primarily in areas where government control was more active.

Despite the death of Medellín cartel drug kingpin Pablo Escobar in 1993 and the arrests of major Cali cartel leaders in 1995 and 1996, Colombian drug cartels remain among the most sophisticated criminal organizations in the world, controlling cocaine processing, international wholesale distribution chains, and markets. In 1999 Colombian police arrested over 30 narcotraffickers, most of them extraditable, in "Operation Millennium" involving extensive international cooperation. More arrests were made in a following "Operation Millennium II."

Colombia is engaged in a broad range of narcotics control activities. Through aerial spraying of herbicide and manual eradication, Colombia has attempted to keep coca, opium poppy, and cannabis cultivation from expanding. The government has committed itself to the eradication of all illicit crops, interdiction of drug shipments, and financial controls to prevent money laundering. Alternative development programs were introduced in 1999.

Corruption and intimidation by traffickers complicate the drug-control efforts of the institutions of government. Colombia passed revised criminal procedures code in 1993 that permits traffickers to surrender and negotiate lenient sentences in return for cooperating with prosecutors. In December 1996 and February 1997, however, the Colombian Congress passed legislation to toughen sentencing, asset forfeiture, and money-laundering penalties.

In November 1997, the Colombian Congress amended the constitution to permit the extradition of Colombian nationals, albeit not retroactively. In late 1999, President Pastrana authorized the first extradition in almost 10 years of a Colombian trafficker to stand trial for U.S. crimes. Three such extraditions to the United States have taken place, the most recent in August 2000, with cases against others pending in Colombian courts. Under the Pastrana administration, Plan Colombia was developed and implemented with U.S. backing.

During the presidency of Álvaro Uribe, the government applied more military pressure on the FARC and other outlawed groups. After the offensive, many security indicators improved. Colombia achieved a great decrease in cocaine production, leading White House drug czar R. Gil Kerlikowske to announce that Colombia is no longer the world's biggest producer of cocaine.

In addition to the challenge posed to the United States by Colombian drug trafficking, illegal Colombian immigrants in the United States are an issue in Colombia-U.S. relations. According to figures from the U.S. Department of Homeland Security, Colombia is the fourth-leading source country of illegal immigration to the United States. According to its estimates, the number of illegal Colombian residents in the United States almost tripled from 51,000 in 1990 to 141,000 in 2000. According to the US Census Bureau, the number of authorized Colombian immigrants in the United States in 2006 was 801,363.

Colombia rejected threats of the United States of America after the threat of Donald Trump to decertify the country as a partner in counter-narcotics efforts.

For more than 30 years Colombia has demonstrated its commitment – paying a very high cost in human lives – with overcoming the drug problem. This commitment stems from the profound conviction that the consumption, production and trafficking of drugs constitute a serious threat to the well-being and security of citizens. Colombia is undoubtedly the country that has fought the most drugs and with more successes on this front. No one has to threaten us to meet this challenge.

— Colombia’s National Government

The problem of drugs is global. Overcoming it can only be achieved through cooperation and under the principle of joint responsibility. Consumer countries’ authorities have a fundamental responsibility to their fellow citizens and the world to reduce consumption and to attack trafficking and distribution organizations in their own countries.

— Colombia’s National Government

== See also ==
- List of diplomatic missions in Colombia
- List of diplomatic missions of Colombia
- Security issues in Colombia
