= Embassy of Indonesia, Bogotá =

Embassy of the Republic of Indonesia in Bogotá Kedutaan Besar Republik Indonesia di Bogota Embajada de la República de Indonesia en Bogotá

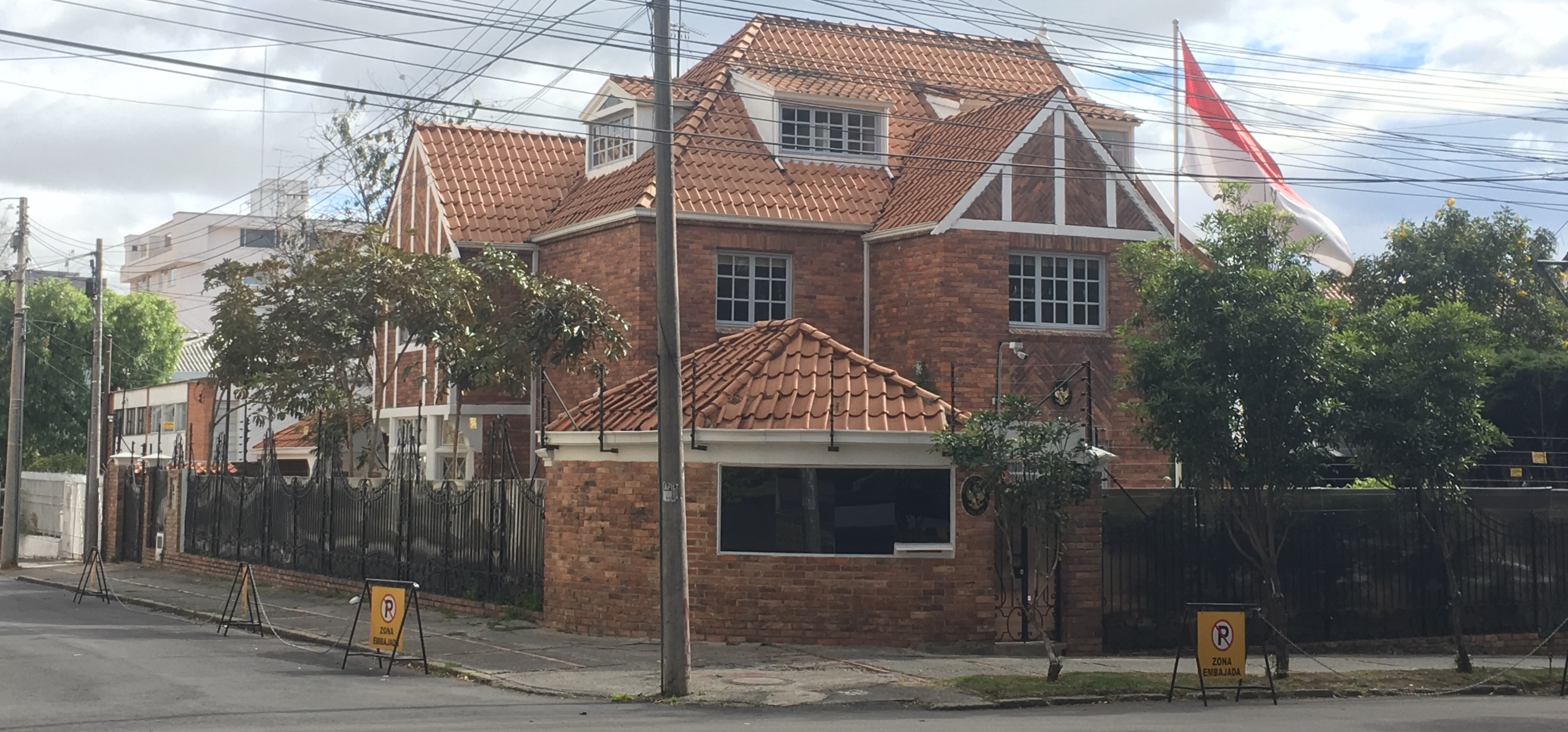
- Location: Bogotá, Colombia
- Address: Calle 70 No. 8-19; Bogotá, Colombia
- Coordinates: 4.65349°N 74.057949°W
- Ambassador: Tatang Budie Utama Razak
- Jurisdiction: Colombia; Antigua and Barbuda; Barbados; Saint Kitts and Nevis
- Website: kemlu.go.id/bogota/en

The Embassy of the Republic of Indonesia in Bogotá (Indonesian: Kedutaan Besar Republik Indonesia di Bogota; Spanish: Embajada de la República de Indonesia en Bogotá) is the diplomatic mission of the Republic of Indonesia to the Republic of Colombia and concurrently accredited to Antigua and Barbuda, Barbados and the Federation of Saint Christopher and Nevis. Diplomatic relations between Indonesia and Colombia were established on 15 September 1980. Initially, the Indonesian embassy in Brasília, Brazil was accredited to Colombia. This continued until the embassy in Bogotá was inaugurated after the arrival of the first Indonesian ambassador to Colombia, Trenggono, on 26 May 1989. The current ambassador is Tatang Budie Utama Razak who was appointed by President Joko Widodo on 25 October 2021.

== Gallery ==
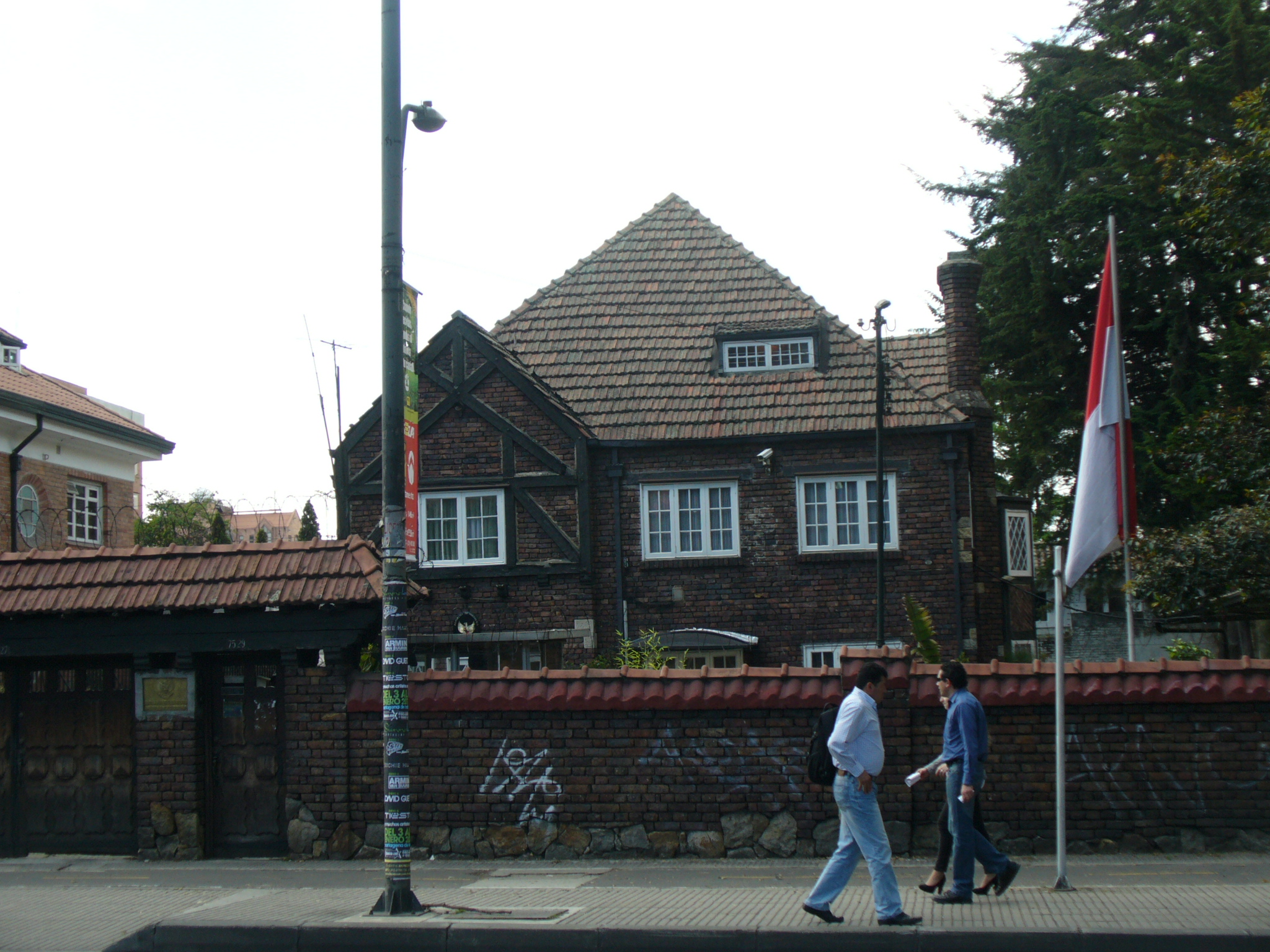
The former chancery at Carrera 11 No. 75-27, Bogotá

== See also ==
- Colombia–Indonesia relations
- List of diplomatic missions of Indonesia
