= Colombia–South Korea relations =

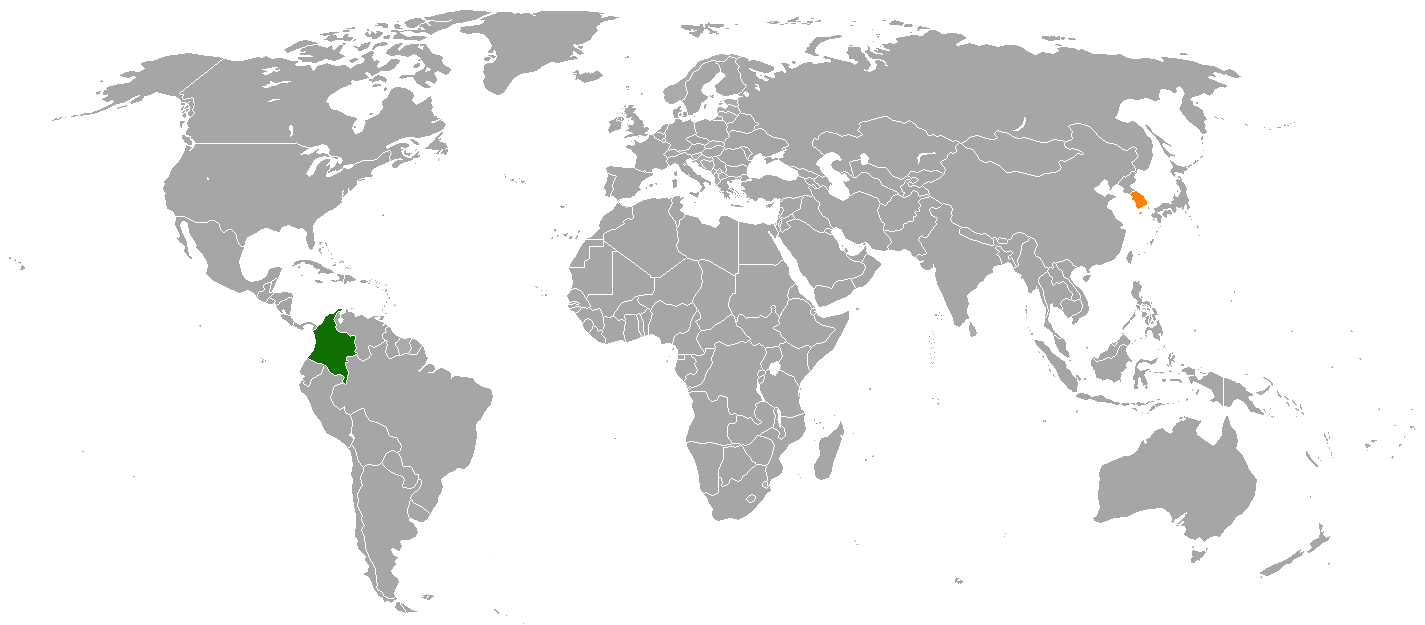
- Colombia: South Korea

Colombia–South Korea relations are the bilateral relations between Colombia and South Korea. Colombian troops arrived in Korea in 1951 as part of UN Forces, but direct diplomatic relations were not established until March 1962. Both countries are members of the Pacific Economic Cooperation Council.

== History ==
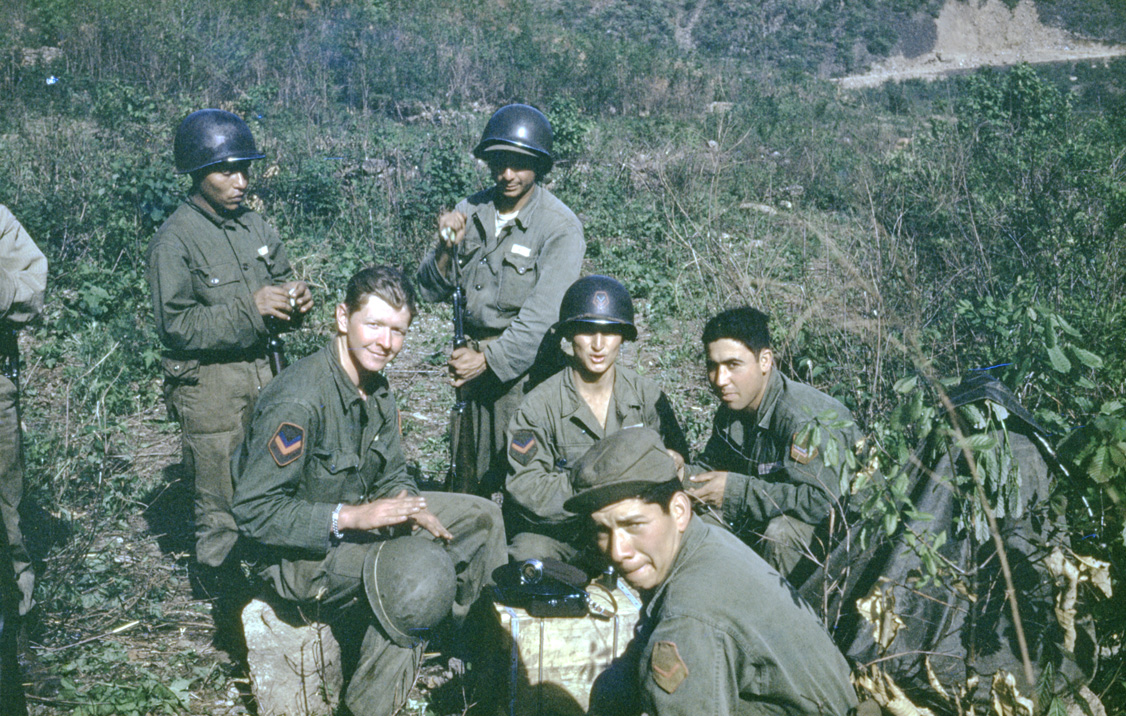
Soldiers of Colombian battalion

=== Korean war and South Korea's ally ===
During the Korean War, Colombia was the only Latin American nation to actively participate in the UN Forces, with ground troops and its only frigate, the Almirante. The first Colombian soldiers arrived in Korea on 8 May 1951 and the last departed on 11 October 1954. In all 4,314 soldiers were deployed. The commander of the forces was general Alberto Ruiz Novoa.

=== After Korean war ===
Colombia and South Korea officially established relations in 1962. Despite the fact that the Korean war was never ended, there are still Colombian military personnel cooperating in United Nations Command.

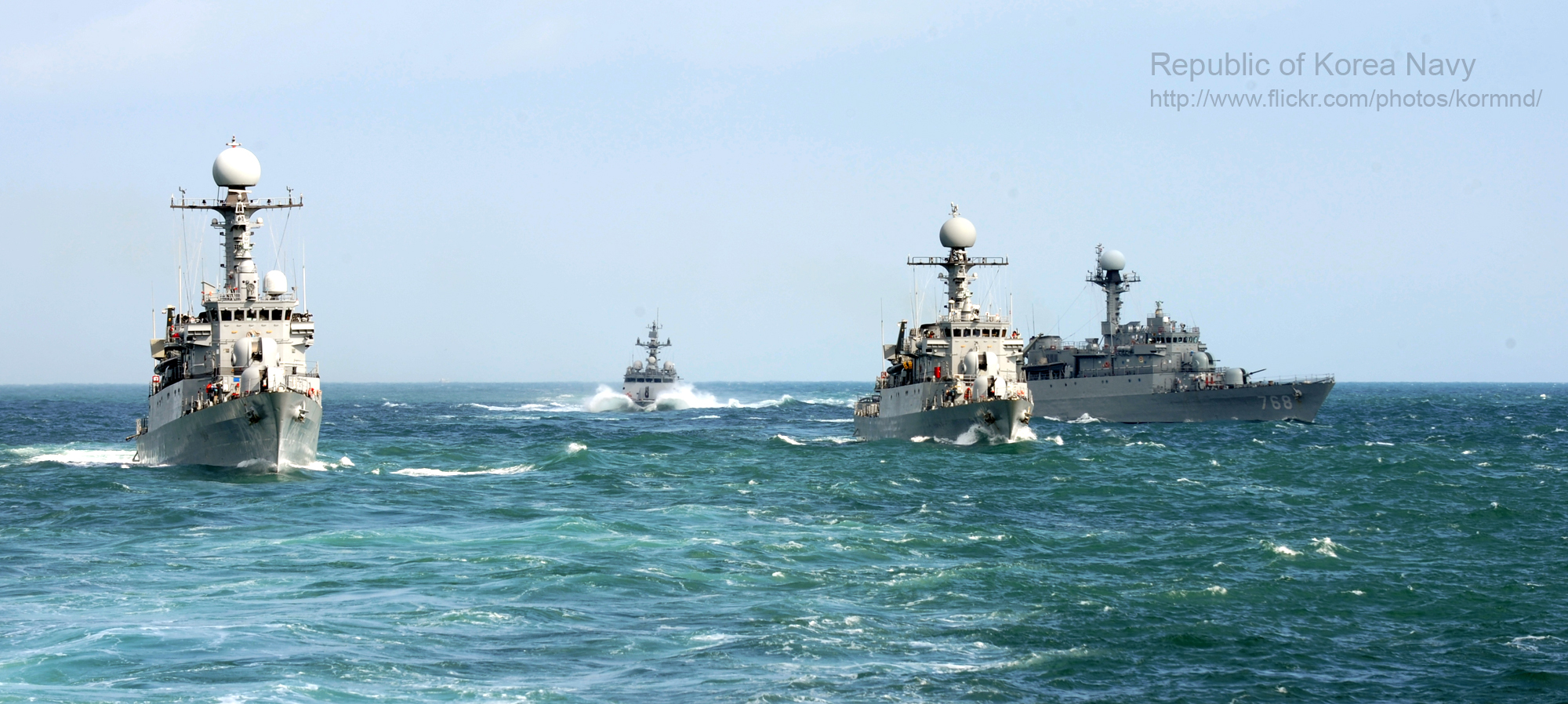
ARC Almirante Tono

In 2020, Korean government decided to yield ROKS Iri to Colombian Navy. Colombian Navy changed ROKS Iri to ARC Almirante Tono.

== Diplomatic missions ==
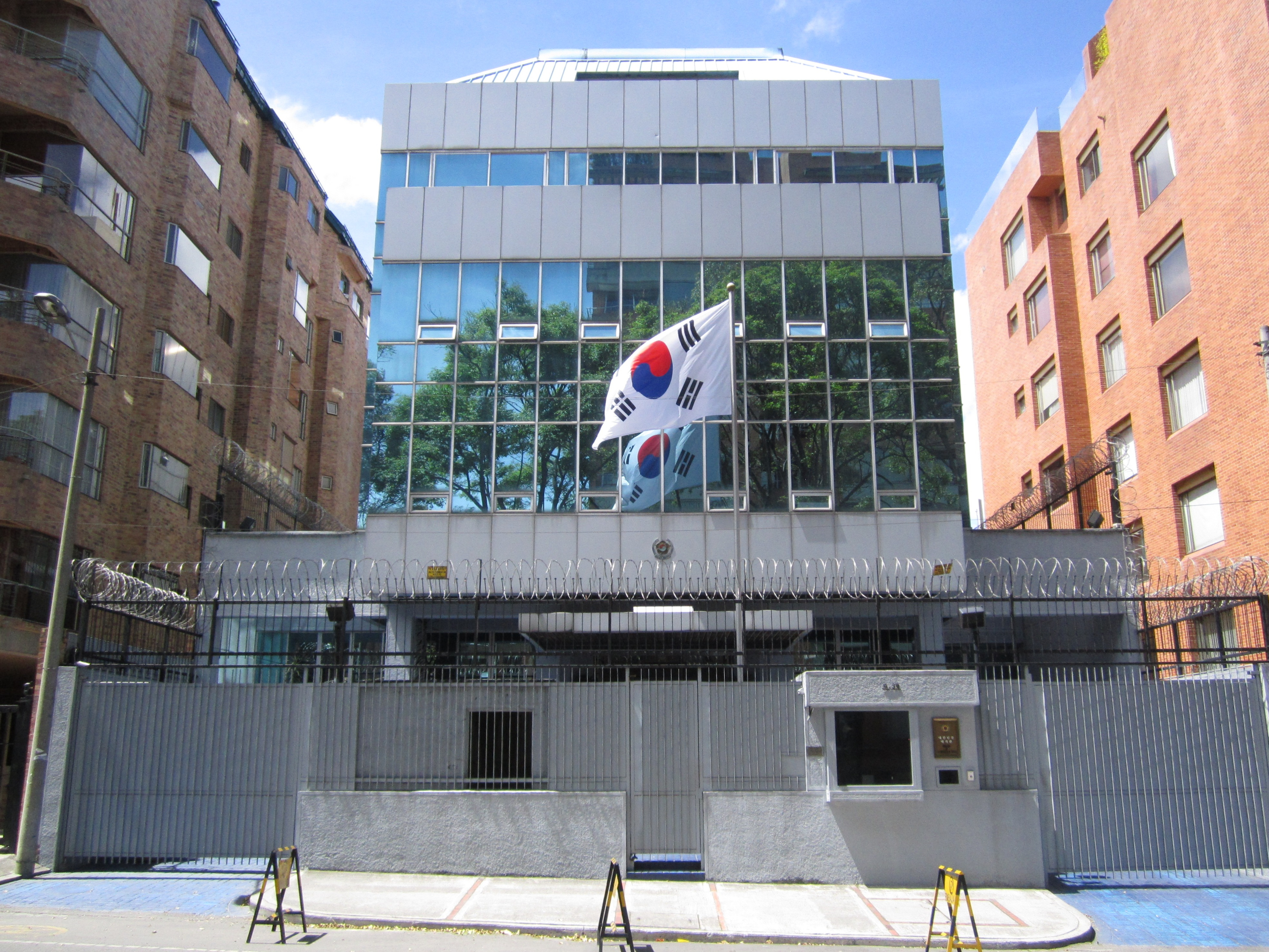
Embassy of South Korea in Bogotá

The South Korean embassy in Bogotá opened in 1971, and Colombia's in Seoul opened in 1978.

The Colombian embassy is located in the Jongno district of Seoul, near the Gyeonghuigung, the Gyeongbokgung, the Sejong Center, and the Seoul Museum of History precisely at 1 Jongno 1-ga at the intersection of Sejongno expressway, and it is serviced by the Gwanghwamun subway station.

Located on the 11th floor of the Kyobo Life Insurance Building, the embassy shares its space with the Consulate General of Colombia in Seoul, which is also accredited to the Philippines in matters of consular affairs.

== Agreements ==
On 25 June 2012, Colombia and Korea officially concluded negotiations for a free trade agreement.

During Colombian President Ivan Duque Marquez's state visit to South Korea in August 2021, both countries signed 14 MOUs in the fields of public health, science and technology, cultural and creative industries, agriculture, ICT, digital government, Small and Medium Business Administration (MSMES), start-up ecosystem, and sustainable development to prevent and respond to diseases.

== Cooperations ==
The Korea International Cooperation Agency (KOICA) opened its office in Bogotá in 2009. During the COVID-19 pandemic, it supported the establishment of medical facilities. South Korea announced a five-year official development assistance program for Colombia by 2025.

== Resident diplomatic missions ==
- Colombia has an embassy in Seoul.
- South Korea has an embassy in Bogotá.

== See also ==
- Foreign relations of Colombia
- Foreign relations of South Korea
  - Indo-Pacific Strategy of South Korea
