= Bolivia–Colombia relations =

- Bolivia: Colombia

Bolivia–Colombia relations refers to the current and historical relationship between Bolivia and Colombia. Both countries are members of the Organization of American States and the Andean Community. Bolivia and Colombia signed a treaty of friendship in 1912. The two countries signed a cooperation agreement for the 100th anniversary of the treaty.

== Resident diplomatic missions ==
- Bolivia has an embassy in Bogotá.
- Colombia has an embassy in La Paz.

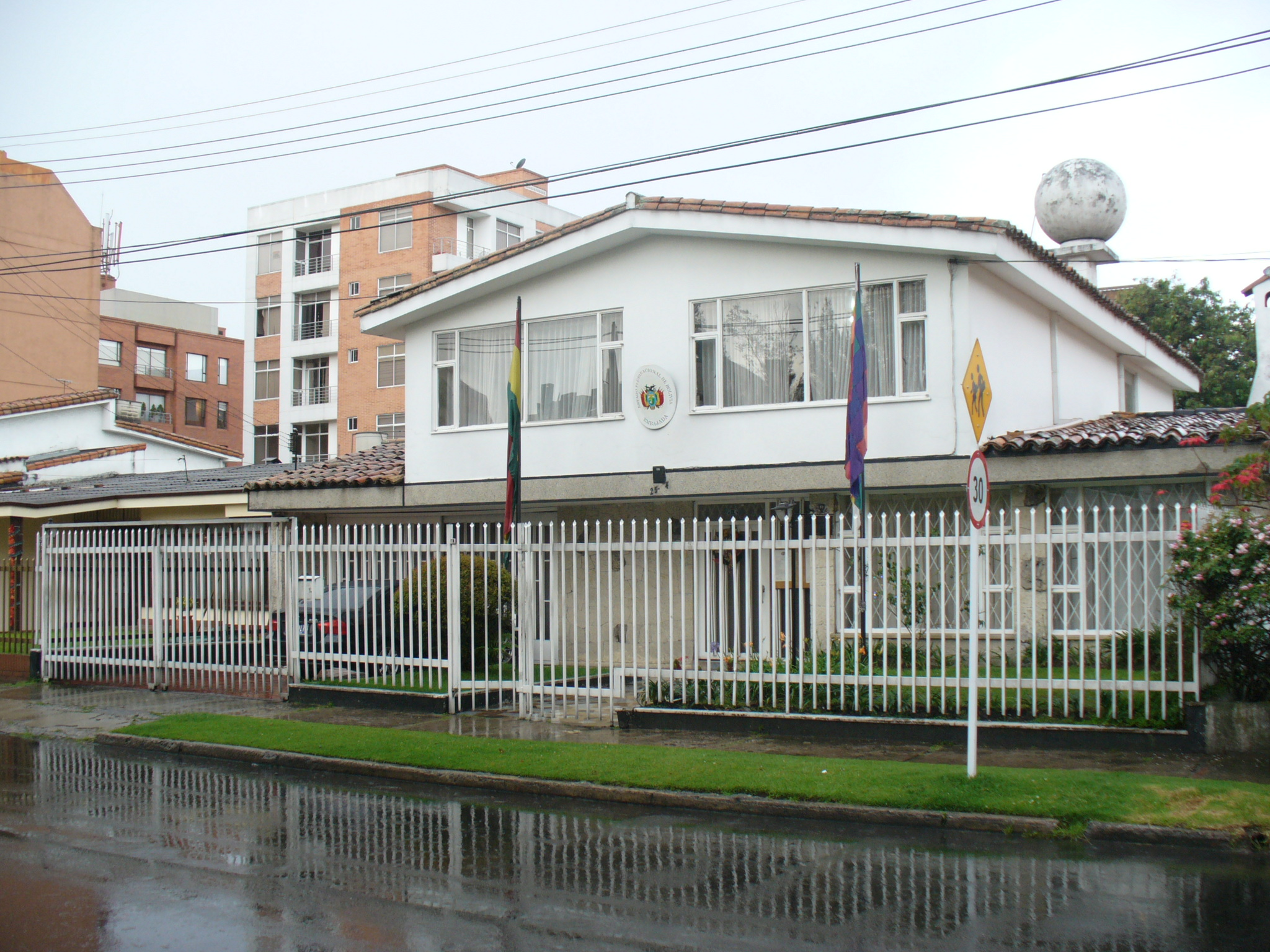
Embassy of Bolivia in Bogotá

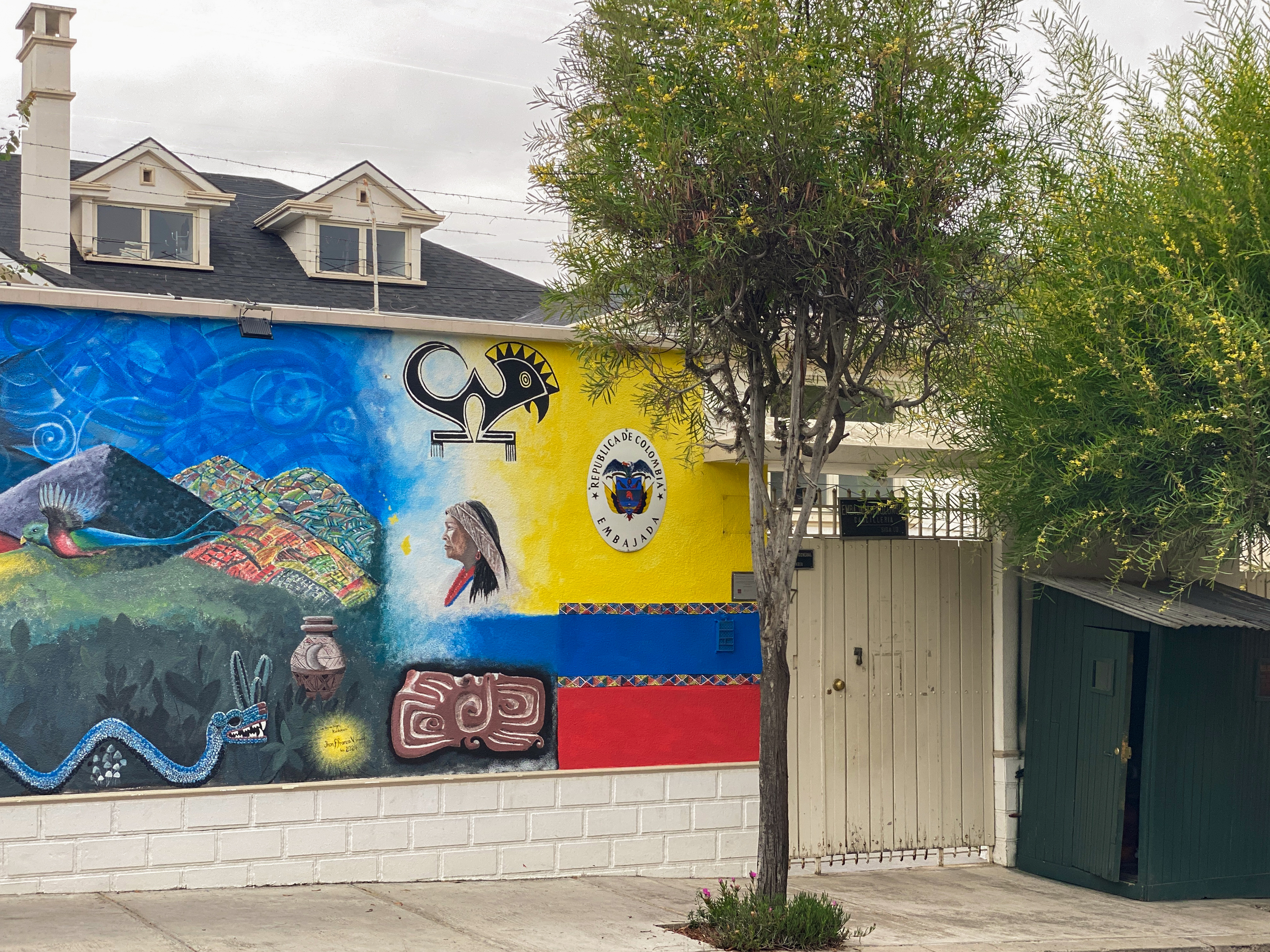
Embassy of Colombia in La Paz

== See also ==
- Foreign relations of Bolivia
- Foreign relations of Colombia
