= Azerbaijan–Colombia relations =

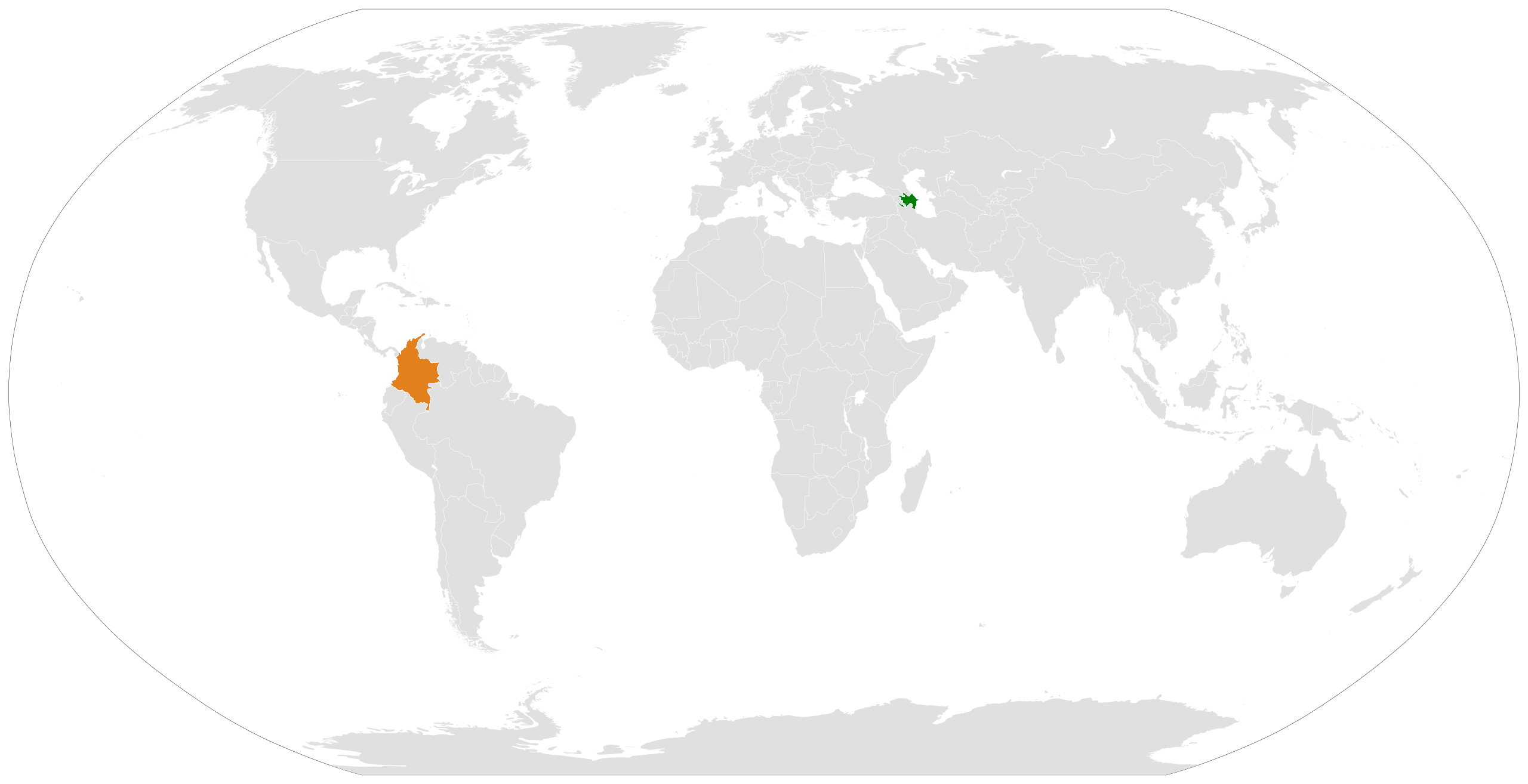

- Azerbaijan: Colombia

Bilateral relations exist between the Republic of Azerbaijan and the Republic of Colombia in political, socio-economic, cultural and other spheres.

Cooperation between the two countries mainly covers such areas as education, culture, sports, and tourism.

== Diplomatic relations ==
Building hosting the Embassy of Colombia in Baku

Diplomatic relations between Azerbaijan and Colombia were established on December 13, 1994.

The Embassy of Azerbaijan in Bogotá and the Embassy of Colombia in Baku have been operating since 2014.

The legal framework includes 5 documents.

== Inter-parliamentary relations ==
The Azerbaijani-Colombian inter-parliamentary working group operates under the National Assembly of Azerbaijan, and the Colombian-Azerbaijani friendship group operates under the Congress of Colombia. the Head of the Azerbaijan-Colombia inter-parliamentary working group is Khanlar Fatiyev.

On September 29–30, 2016, first Vice-President of the Senate of Colombia Daira de Jesus Galviz Mendez, senators Teresita Garcia Romero and Maritza Martinez Aristizabal visited Azerbaijan to participate in the Fifth World Humanitarian Forum held in Baku.

On March 28, 2012, the Colombian Congress adopted the resolution "Illegal occupation of Azerbaijani territories" on the Nagorno-Karabakh conflict.

On July 30, 2013, the relevant document (proposal) on the Nagorno-Karabakh conflict and the Khojaly massacre was adopted by the second Committee on foreign relations and national defense of the house of representatives of the Colombian Congress.

On February 20, 2017, the document (approval) on the 25th anniversary of the Khojaly tragedy was adopted by the second Committee on foreign relations and national defense of the Congress of Colombia.

In December 2018, the second Committee of the Congress of Colombia adopted a resolution on the Nagorno-Karabakh conflict, supporting the position of the Republic of Azerbaijan.

== High-level visits ==
- On September 21, 2017, during a meeting between the Minister of foreign affairs of Colombia, Maria Angela Holguin, and the Minister of foreign affairs of Azerbaijan, Elmar Mammadyarov, a Declaration on the development of cooperation in the field of culture and sports was signed in New York City.
- On June 16–18, 2017, Maria Angela Holguin met with President of Azerbaijan Ilham Aliyev and Elmar Mammadyarov.
- On May 30, 2017, during a meeting between Maria Angela Holguin, and Elmar Mammadyarov, a Memorandum of understanding in the field of culture was signed in Bogota. The book "Anthology of poetry of Colombia and Azerbaijan" was presented.
- On September 1, 2016, the Head of Europe Juan Guillemro Castro met with Deputy foreign Minister of Azerbaijan Khalaf Khalafov in Baku. The sides discussed the prospects for enhancing trade and tourism exchange between the countries.
- September 24–26, 2014 – the Head of Europe Francisco Coy paid a working visit to Azerbaijan to track issues on the bilateral agenda and cooperation in the fields of energy, trade and economic development.
- In May 2014, there was a meeting held in Algeria between Deputy foreign Minister Patti Londo and Mr. Mammadyarov within the framework of the XVII meeting of the Non-Aligned Movement.
- On September 25, 2013, within the framework of the 68th UN General Assembly, there was a meeting held in New York between the MFAs of Colombia and Azerbaijan.

== Inter-party political consultations ==
1. On July 24–26, 2012, the first session of inter-party political consultations was held within the framework of the working visit of Elmar Mammadyarov to Colombia.
2. On September 30 – October 2, 2012, during the working visit of Deputy foreign Minister of Colombia Monica Lanzetta to Azerbaijan, the second session of the inter-party political consultations was held.
3. On July 8, 2013, during the working visit of Colombian foreign Minister to Azerbaijan, the third session of inter-party political consultations was held.
4. On May 29–30, 2017, during the working visit of Azerbaijani foreign Minister to Colombia, the fourth session of inter-party political consultations was held.

== Economic cooperation ==
Trade turnover (in thousands of US dollars)

Year	Trade turnover	Import	Export
2013	796.2	785.8	1.4
2014	112.2	111.3	0.9
2015	522.3	486.1	54.2
2016	268.9	160.9	108
2017	445.97	374.73	71.24
2018	734.04	656.49	77.55

The main exports from Colombia are fruits, flowers, and coffee.

Sumac, kermani, carpets, and sports equipment are the main exports from Azerbaijan.

In the summer of 2012, during a meeting between the Minister of industry and energy Natig Aliyev and the Chairman of the second constitutional Committee of the Senate of Colombia, Alejandra Moreno Piraquive, the parties proposed cooperation in the oil and gas sector.

On April 3–5, 2019, a joint Azerbaijani-Colombian business forum was held in Bogota with the participation of business people from all countries.

It is planned to establish a joint Chamber of Commerce.

== Tourism ==
On November 22, 2013, the law on visa cancellation for Azerbaijani citizens wishing to visit Colombia came into force.

== International cooperation ==
In the international arena, cooperation between the two countries is carried out within the framework of international organizations: the United Nations, Non-aligned Movement, etc.

== Cultural ties ==
On September 15, 2013, the Ministry of Foreign Affairs of Colombia organized the first Spanish language course for employees of the Ministry of Foreign Affairs of Azerbaijan. This course is held annually on a permanent basis.

On April 26 – May 1, 2013, officials of the Heydar Aliyev Foundation, Ilgar Mustafayev and Garanfil Hasanova made a working visit to Colombia.

On May 14, 2013, the Samed Vurgun Azerbaijan State Russian Drama theater in Baku hosted a concert of Colombian dance groups "Fundacion Delirio" and "Hecho en Cali".

On September 9, 2015, an evening of Colombian culture was held in Baku.

On March 16, 2016, a presentation entitled "Azerbaijan: from history to independence” was held at El Bosque University in Bogota, organized by the representative office of the Azerbaijani Embassy in Mexico.

On November 14–26, 2016, the Colombia women's national volleyball team participated in a joint training program held in Azerbaijan as part of the Azerbaijan-Colombia joint sports exchange project.

On February 20, 2019, with the financial support of the Embassy of Colombia in Azerbaijan, a photo exhibition "Colombia-Azerbaijan: Rhapsody of flowers" was held in the art gallery in the old part of Baku "Icheri Sheher".

On April 8, 2019, the "Turkey-Caucasus (Azerbaijan)" research center was established at Columbia Externado University.

== See also ==
- Foreign relations of Azerbaijan
- Foreign relations of Colombia
