= Colombia–Hungary relations =

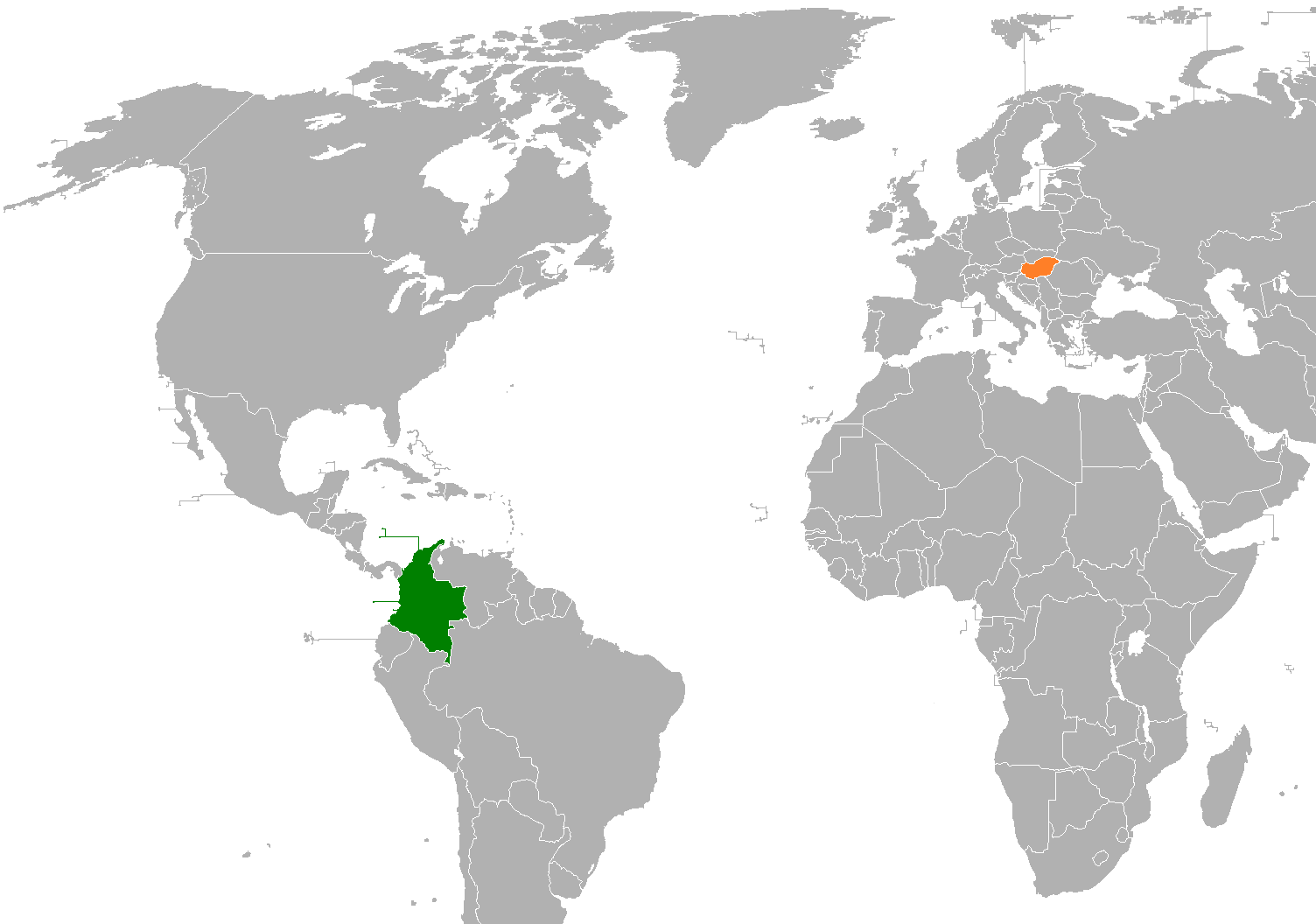

- Colombia: Hungary

Colombia–Hungary relations are the bilateral relations between the Republic of Colombia and Hungary. Both nations are members of the OECD, World Trade Organization and the United Nations.

== History ==
Initial relations between Colombia and the Austro-Hungarian Empire took place in 1870 when the empire opened an honorary consulates in Barranquilla and in Bogotá. In 1918 after World War I, the Austro-Hungarian Empire disintegrated and Hungary became an independent nation.

In 1968, Hungary opened a consulate-general in Bogotá. Official diplomatic relations between Colombia and Hungary began on 28 March 1973. In October 2017, the Hungarian embassy in Colombia was reopened with the presence of the Hungarian Foreign Minister Péter Szijjártó.

In September 2016, the Hungarian Commercial Office was opened in Bogotá. In March 2018, the Colombian embassy in Budapest was opened. In May 2018, Colombian President Juan Manuel Santos paid an official visit to Hungary, becoming the first Colombian head-of-state to pay such a visit. During his visit, President Santos met with Hungarian President János Áder and Prime Minister Viktor Orbán.

== High-level visits ==
High-level visits from Colombia to Hungary

- Foreign Minister María Ángela Holguín (2017, 2018)
- President Juan Manuel Santos (2018)

High-level visits from Hungary to Colombia

- Foreign Minister Péter Szijjártó (2017)

== Bilateral agreements ==
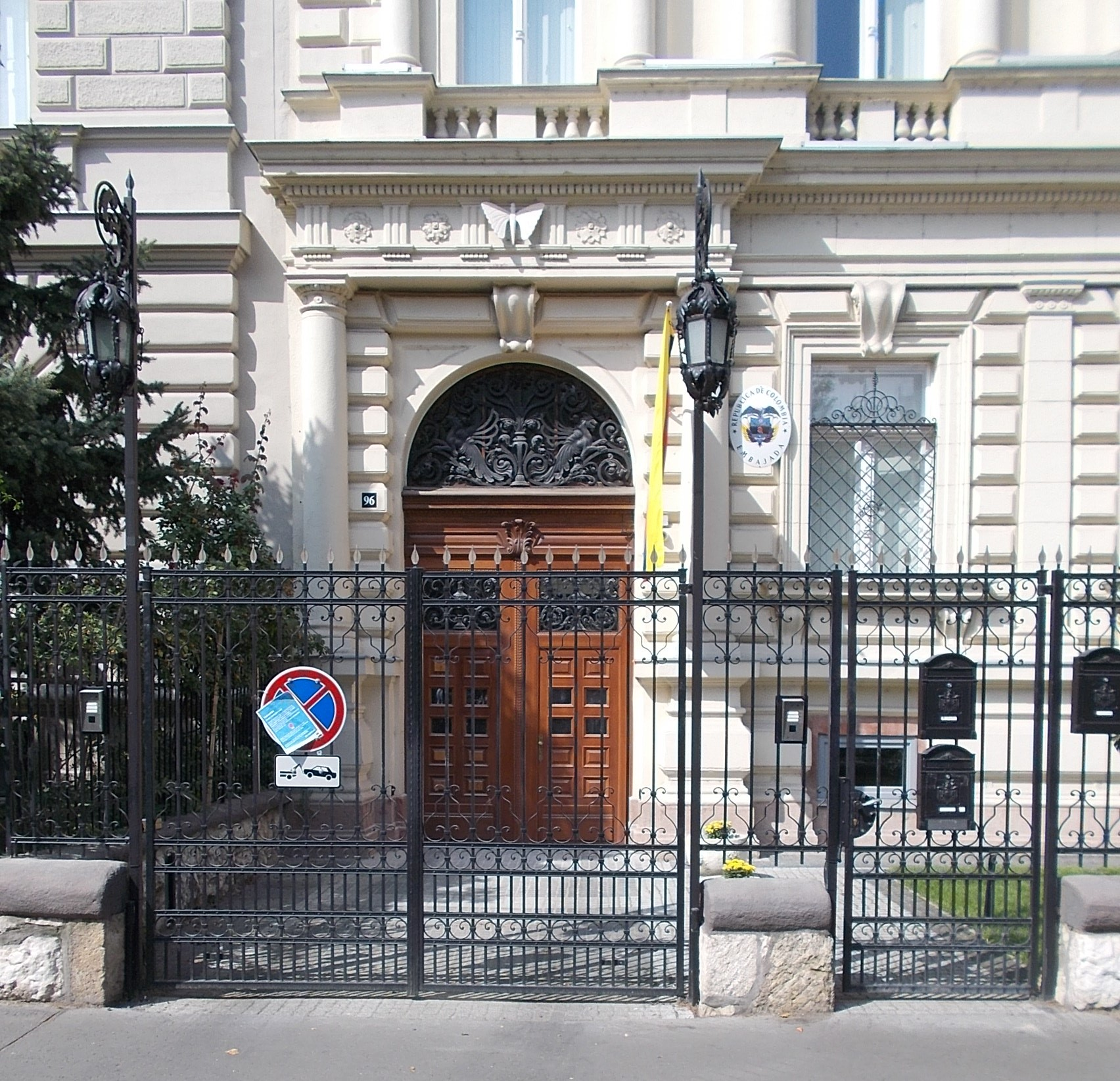
Embassy of Colombia in Budapest

Both nations have signed a few bilateral agreements such as an Agreement for Technical, Scientific and Mutual Aid Cooperation (1970); Agreement on Cultural and Scientific Cooperation (2014); Agreement on Trade (2013); and an Agreement for Corporate Cooperation (2017).

== Resident diplomatic missions ==
- Colombia has an embassy in Budapest.
- Hungary has an embassy in Bogotá.

== See also ==
- Foreign relations of Colombia
- Foreign relations of Hungary
- Immigration to Colombia
