= Colombia–Guyana relations =

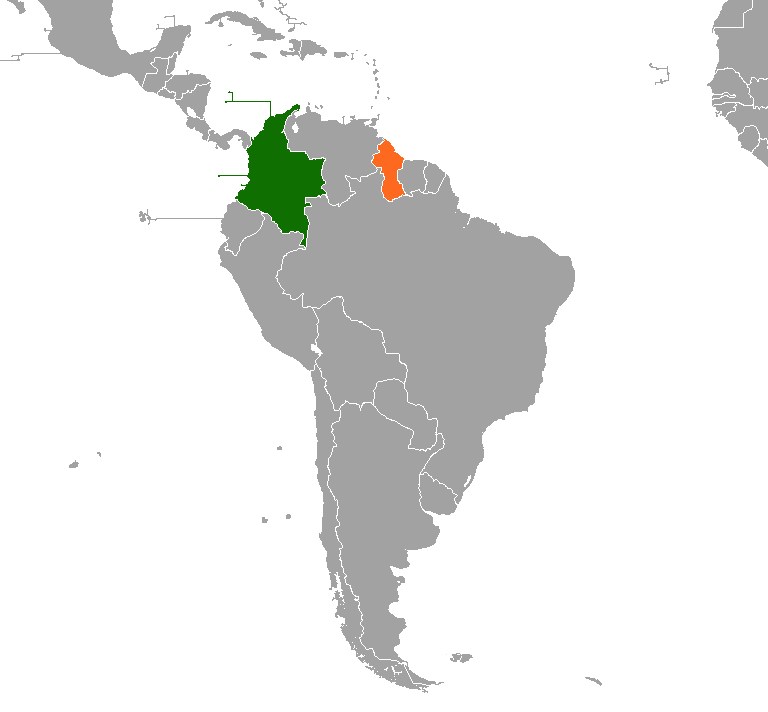

- Colombia: Guyana

Diplomatic mission
- Embassy of Colombia in Port of Spain: Embassy of Guyana in Caracas

Colombia–Guyana relations are the diplomatic relations between the Republic of Colombia and the Cooperative Republic of Guyana. Both governments have maintained a friendly relationship since the 20th century. The two countries have worked together on different types of projects, including environmental and disaster management, reducing international drug trafficking and organised crime, as well as nutrition and food supply.

== History ==
During the time of the Viceroyalty of New Granada and Gran Colombia, both countries shared a border, and from there arose the border conflict over the Guayana Esequiba.

Both governments established diplomatic relations in 1970. In 2018 and 2019, Colombia's foreign ministers (María Ángela Holguín and Carlos Trujillo respectively) travelled to Georgetown and met with members of the Guyanese government.

== Economic relations ==
Colombia exported the equivalent of 11.642 billion dollars, with the main exported products being those related to machinery, chemicals and plastics; while Guyana exported for a value equivalent to 1.4 billion dollars, with the main exported products being agricultural and agro-industrial products.

In 2017, Guyana experienced a net trade with Colombia, which contained exported products including mineral products, vegetable products, and foodstuffs. Five years later in 2022, Colombia also experienced a large trade net with Guyana in the exported products of machines ($13.6M), chemical products ($7.05M), and plastics and rubbers ($6.38M).

== Diplomatic representation ==
- Colombia has an embassy in Georgetown.
- Guyana's embassy in Caracas is accredited to Colombia.

== See also ==
- Foreign relations of Colombia
- Foreign relations of Guyana
