= Colombia–Malaysia relations =

- Colombia: Malaysia

Colombia–Malaysia relations refers to bilateral relations between Colombia and Malaysia. Colombia maintains an embassy in Kuala Lumpur, while the embassy of Malaysia in Lima, Peru is accredited to Colombia. Both countries are members of the Group of 77, Non-Aligned Movement and the Pacific Economic Cooperation Council.

== History ==
Diplomatic relations between the two countries began on 19 August 1978. Malaysia largely supported Colombia's acceptance in 1994 to the Pacific Economic Cooperation Council.

== Economic relations ==
The countries both belong to the Global System of Trade Preferences among Developing Countries which is a preferential trade agreement that was signed in 1989. Both countries agree on the importance of co-operating on issues such as the protection and sustainable use of natural resources, the fight against the world drug problem, and strengthening relations between the countries of the Pacific basin. In 1989, Malaysia contributed around $54,000 to Colombia in its fight against the drug trafficking. In 1994, Colombia expressed their interest to collaborate in agricultural sectors as both countries have a common tropical climate, as well to increase their economic productivity and development in human resources. The country also seeking to a palm oil alliances in 1999. By 2001, Malaysian Prime Minister Mahathir Mohamad said it is ready to help Colombia to develop their palm oil industry to decrease the dependence of Colombia to the plantation of coca.

== United Nations ==
In 1989, Malaysia proposed to the United Nations (UN) that an international military be organised to counter private drug cartels and armies to aid countries such as Colombia. On 27 October 1990, the two countries along with Cuba and Yemen voiced concerns over a UN resolution that would make Iraq responsible for financial repercussions relating to the invasion of Kuwait. Eventually an agreement was made to increase pressure on President Saddam Hussein to withdraw from Kuwait and end the Gulf War. The war would eventually end on 28 February 1991 with the intervention of the Coalition of the Gulf War. Although Malaysia and Colombia supported the UN-authorised use of force against Iraq, neither country participated directly in the Coalition. In 2006, both countries applied to the United Nations Environmental Programme during the Montreal Protocol for International Strengthening (IS). The committee's reviewed their applications together and approved $275,000 in funding for both countries.

== See also ==
- Foreign relations of Colombia
- Foreign relations of Malaysia
