= Colombia–Paraguay relations =

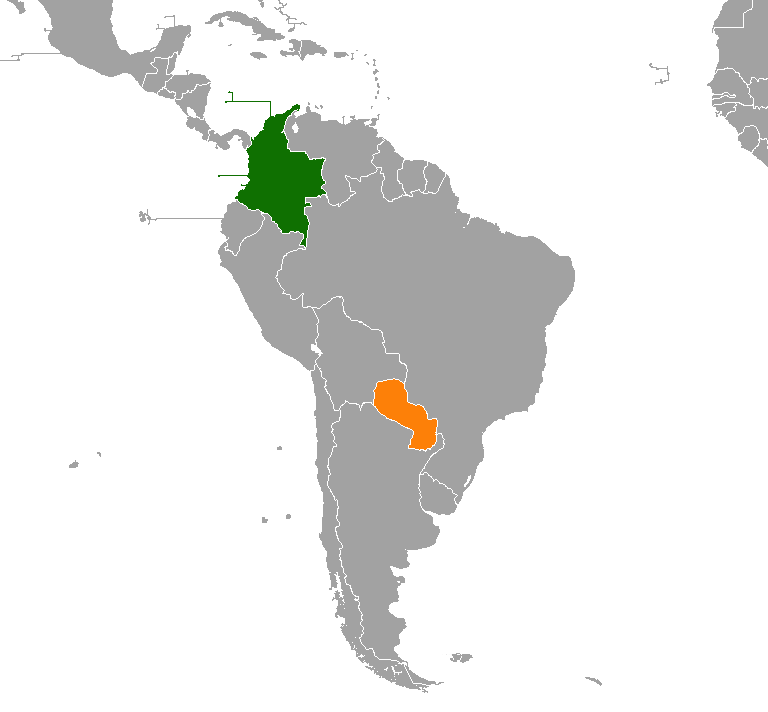

- Colombia: Paraguay

Colombia–Paraguay relations are the bilateral relations between Colombia and Paraguay. Both nations are members of the Community of Latin American and Caribbean States, Latin American Integration Association, Organization of American States, Organization of Ibero-American States and the United Nations.

== History ==
Both Colombia and Paraguay share a common history in the fact that both nations were once part of the Spanish Empire. During the Spanish colonial period, Colombia was governed by the Viceroyalty of New Granada in Bogotá while Paraguay was then part of the Viceroyalty of the Río de la Plata and administered from Buenos Aires. In 1819, the Viceroyalty of New Granada obtained its independence from Spain and became the Republic of New Granada. In 1846, the Republic of New Granada recognized an independent Paraguay.

In 1864, during the War of the Triple Alliance between Paraguay and Argentina, Brazil and Uruguay; Colombia morally supported Paraguay and protested against the war. Colombia offered to grant Colombian citizenship to any Paraguayan stepping on Colombian soil if as a result of the war Paraguay were to disappear by having been split between the three victors. The offer of citizenship was not required at the end of the war as Paraguay was allowed to remain existing, albeit with reduced territory.

In 1920, both nations opened resident diplomatic missions in their respective capitals. During the Chaco War between Paraguay and Bolivia, Colombia became a mediator between the two nations to try to find a peaceful solution. Since then, relations between both nations have remained close. Both nations partake in various multilateral South American summits and have had several high-level bilateral meetings. In April 2017, Colombian President Juan Manuel Santos paid a visit to Paraguay. In February 2019, Paraguayan President Mario Abdo Benítez paid a visit to Colombia.

== Bilateral agreements ==
Both nations have signed numerous agreements such as an Agreement on Cultural Exchanges (1965); Agreement on Scientific and Technical Cooperation (1980); Agreement on academic cooperation between both nations Diplomatic and Consular Academies (1993); Agreement on Tourism Cooperation (1993); Agreement on Judicial Cooperation in Criminal Matters (1997); Agreement on Cooperation for the Prevention, Control and Repression of Money Laundering of any Illicit Activity (1997); Agreement on Cooperation for the Fight against Illicit Trafficking of Narcotic Drugs and Psychotropic Substances (1997); Agreement on Security (2005); Agreement of Cooperation for the Recovery of Illicitly Imported or Exported Cultural Property (2008) and an Air Transportation Agreement (2013).

== Transportation ==
There are direct flights between both nations with Avianca.

== Resident diplomatic missions ==
- Colombia has an embassy in Asunción.
- Paraguay has an embassy in Bogotá.

== See also ==
- List of ambassadors of Paraguay to Colombia
- Club Sport Colombia
