= Colombia–Philippines relations =

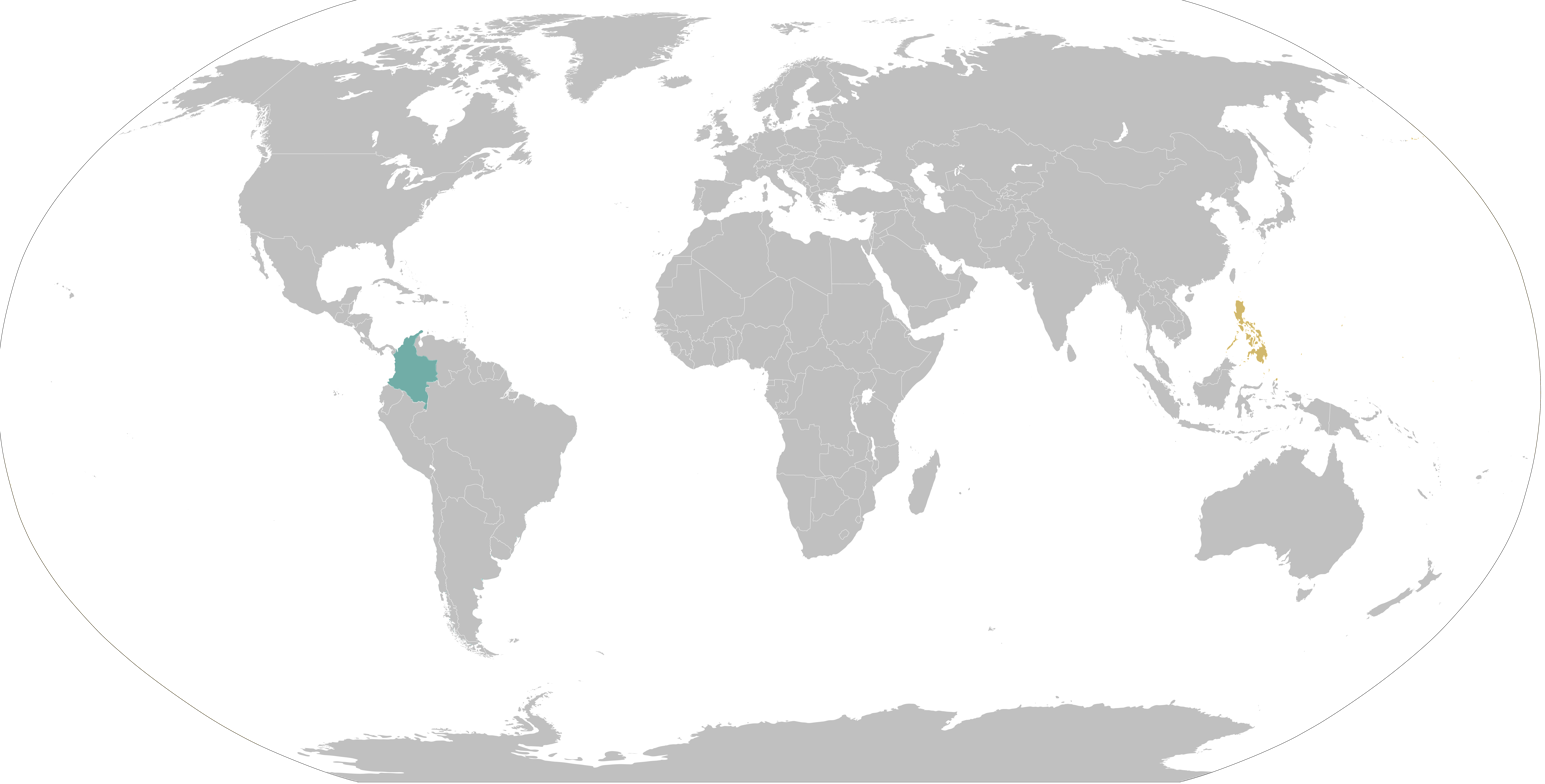

- Colombia: Philippines

Colombia–Philippines relations refers to the bilateral relations between Colombia and the Philippines. Colombia has an embassy in Manila. The Philippines maintains an embassy in Bogotá. Both countries are predominantly Roman Catholic, and are former Spanish colonies.

== History ==
Relations between Colombia and the Philippines began before they became nations. For a time after the establishment of the Manila galleons that linked Latin America with Asia, Spain prohibited direct trade between the Viceroyalty of Peru, which included Colombia, and the Viceroyalty of New Spain, which included the Philippines. However, illegal trade between Filipinos and Colombians continued in secret, as illegal Asian goods ended up in the markets of Córdoba, Colombia, due to the collusion between Filipino, Peruvian, and Colombian merchants. They settled and traded with each other while contravening royal mercantile laws. Before the establishment of the First Filipino Republic, Colombians were seminal in the formation of the Philippines. Latin American officers from Gran Colombia were among the rebel soldiers supporting Andres Novales, the brief Emperor of the Philippines, in his short-lived revolt against Spain. Also, the first winner of the Miss International female beauty pageant, Miss Stella Marquez of Colombia, married Filipino Jorge Araneta. Official relations between Colombia and the Philippines were established in 1959. Bilateral relations between the two nations remain healthy.

Philippine President Fidel V. Ramos visited Colombia in October 1995 to attend the Non-Aligned Movement summit in Cartagena, while President Gloria Macapagal Arroyo visited Colombia in November 2008 for an official visit. Meanwhile, Colombian President Juan Manuel Santos visited the Philippines in November 2015 to attend the APEC summit in Manila as an invited guest.

In August 2024, the Philippine Department of Foreign Affairs announced plans to open a Philippine embassy in Colombia.

== Resident diplomatic missions ==
- Colombia has an embassy in Manila.
- The Philippines has an embassy in Bogotá.

== See also ==
- Foreign relations of Colombia
- Foreign relations of the Philippines
