= Austria–Colombia relations =

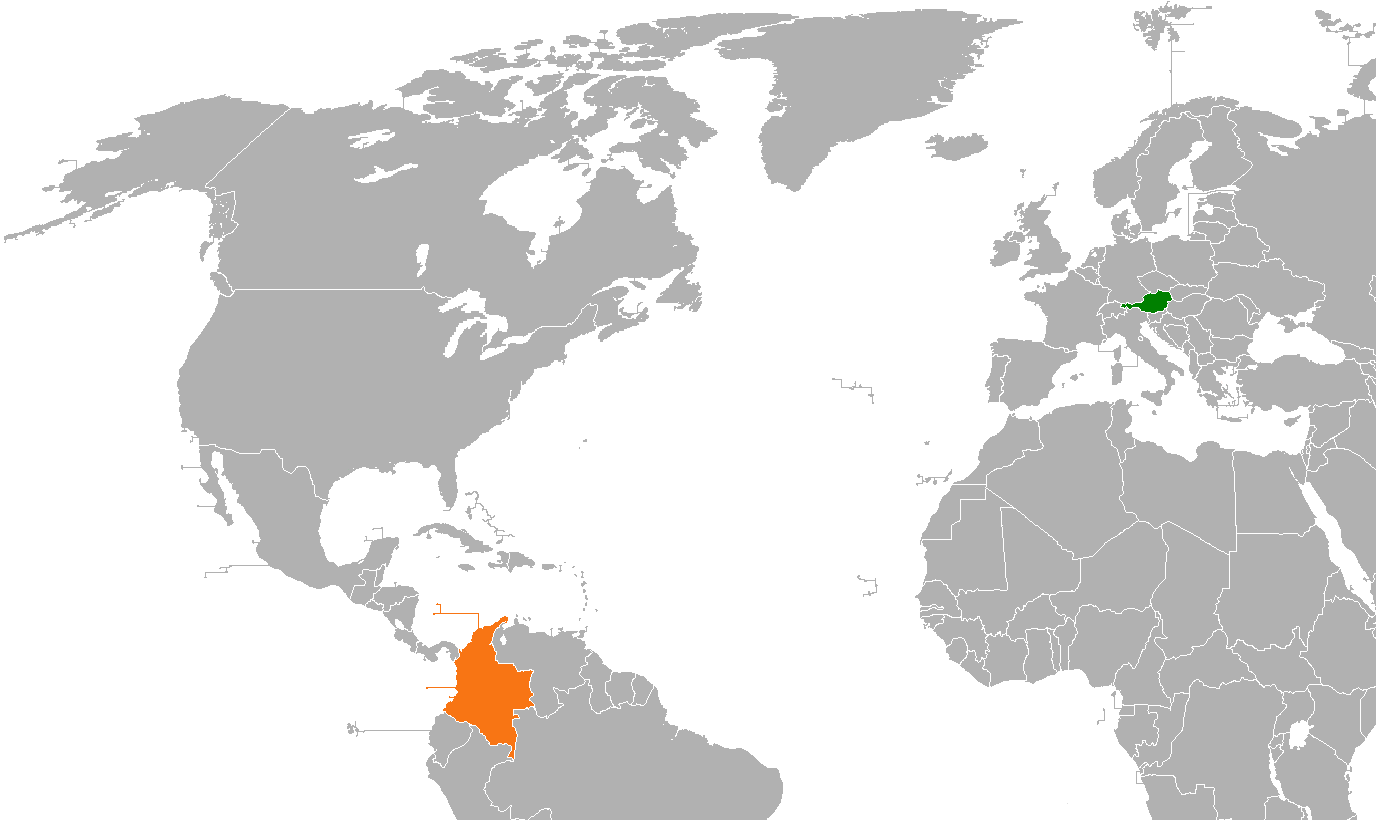
- Austria: Colombia

Diplomatic relations exist between the Republic of Austria and the Republic of Colombia. Both nations are members of the OECD and the United Nations.

== History ==
Initial relations between Colombia and the Austro-Hungarian Empire took place in 1870 when the empire opened an honorary consulate in Barranquilla and in Bogotá. After World War I in 1918, the Austro-Hungarian Empire disintegrated and Austria became an independent nation.

In 1920, Austria and Colombia established diplomatic relations. Soon afterwards, both nations opened resident diplomatic missions in their respective capitals. In 2012, Austria closed its embassy in Bogotá, however, the embassy was reopened in 2016.

In March 2016, Austrian President Heinz Fischer paid an official visit to Colombia, becoming the first Austrian head-of-state to visit the South American nation. In January 2018, Colombian President Juan Manuel Santos paid an official visit to Austria, becoming the first Colombian President to visit the nation.

== High-level Visits ==
High-level visits from Austria to Colombia

- President Heinz Fischer (2016)

High-level visits from Colombia to Austria

- Vice President Angelino Garzón (2011)
- Foreign Vice Minister Mónica Lanzetta Mutis (2011)
- Foreign Minister María Ángela Holguín (2013)
- President Juan Manuel Santos (2018)

== Bilateral agreements ==
Both nations have signed a few bilateral agreements such as Agreement for the Abolition of Visas for holders of Diplomatic, Official or Service Passports (1958); Memorandum of Understanding on High-Level Political Consultations between both countries Ministry's of Foreign Affairs (1999); Memorandum of Understanding of Cooperation in Economic, Scientific and Technological Matters (2012); and a Memorandum of Understanding for closer Cooperation in the Judicial Field (2015).

== Cultural ties ==
The famous botanist and physician Nikolaus Joseph von Jacquin (1727–1817) conducted research trips to the region between 1755 and 1759, which took him to the Atlantic coast of Colombia. Karl Brunner (1887–1960) is considered the founding father of modern urban planning in Bogotá, where he served in the 1930s. Gerardo Reichel-Dolmatoff (1912–1994) was one of the founding fathers of cultural anthropology and ethnology in Colombia. The architect Fritz Blodek (1905–2001) designed more than 150 buildings for housing and industrial use, especially in Medellín. The bookseller and journalist Hans Ungar (1916–2004) created a Central Library with the axis of the intellectual and cultural life of Bogotá.

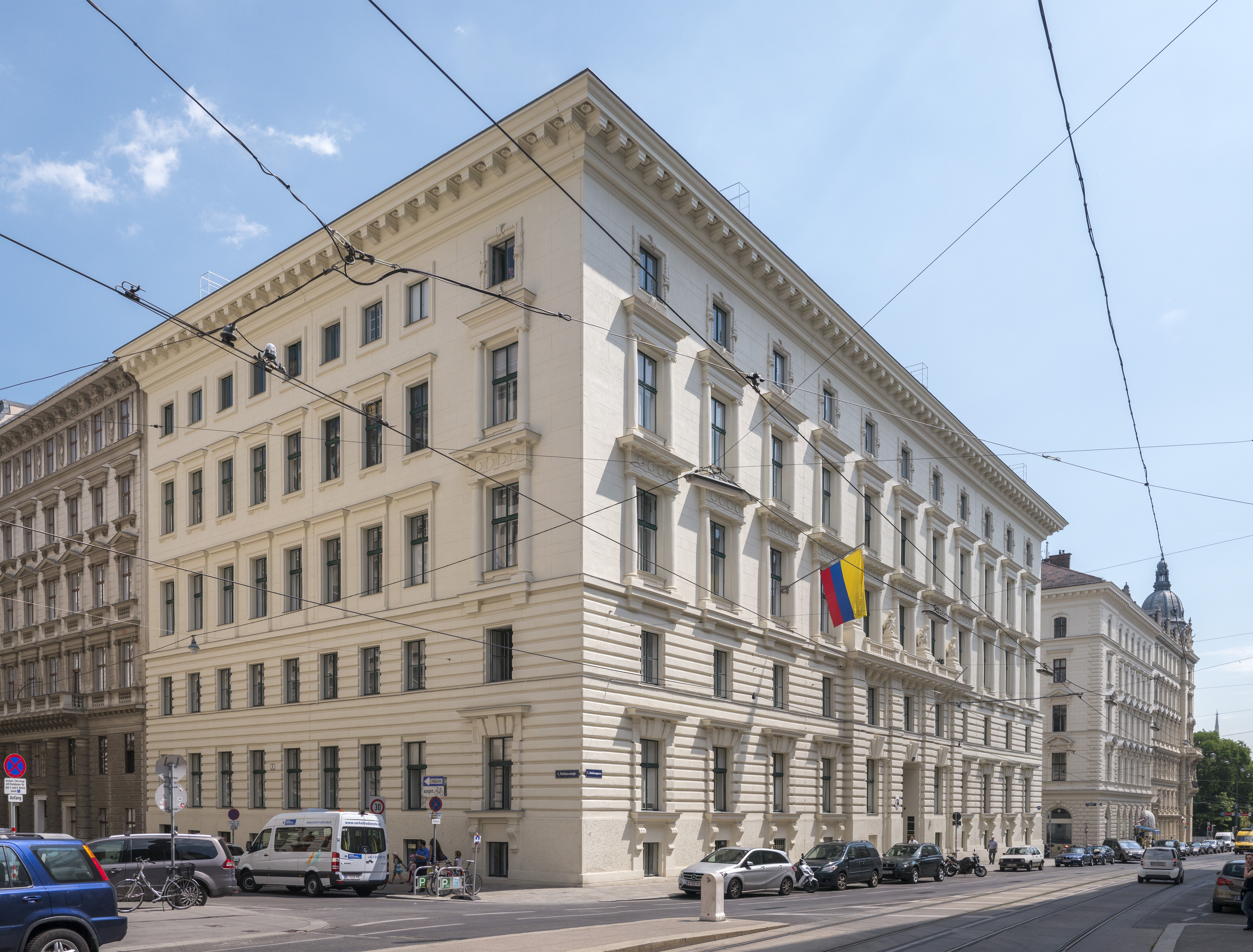
Embassy of Colombia in Vienna

== Resident diplomatic missions ==
- Austria has an embassy in Bogotá.
- Colombia has an embassy in Vienna.

== See also ==
- Foreign relations of Austria
- Foreign relations of Colombia
- Embassy of Colombia, Vienna
- Immigration to Colombia
