= Colombia–Turkey relations =

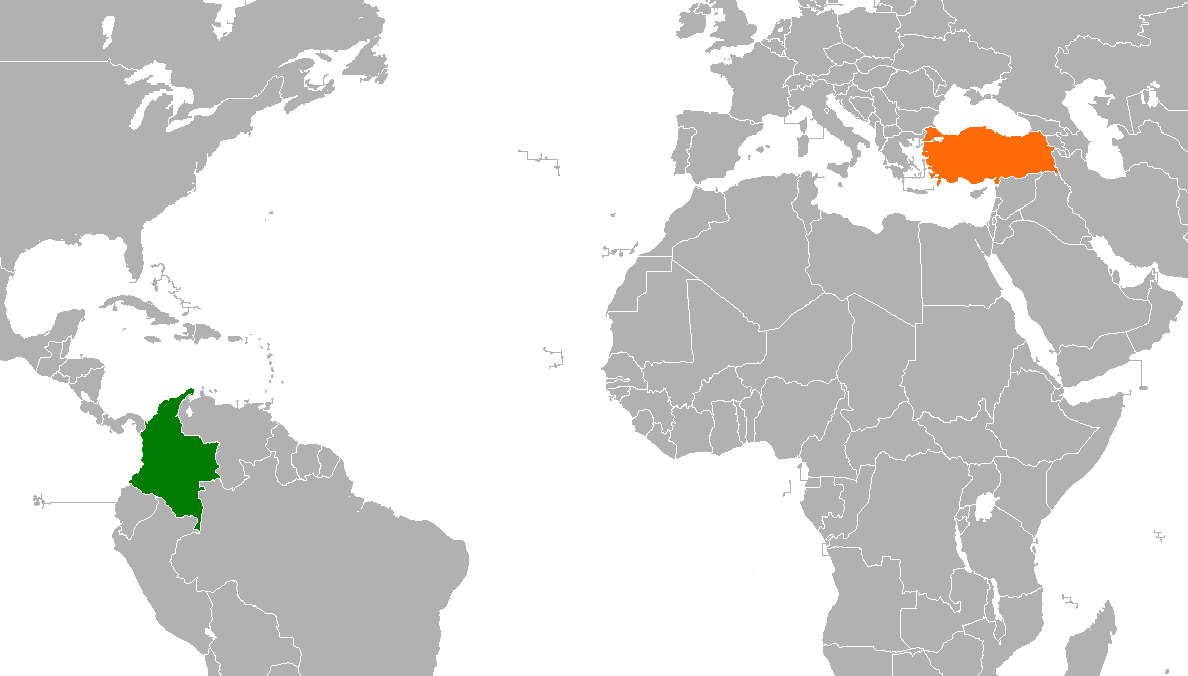
- Colombia: Turkey

Colombia–Turkey relations are foreign relations between Colombia and Turkey. Diplomatic relations between the two countries were established in 1959. Turkey has an embassy in Bogotá (since 2010) while Colombia has an embassy in Ankara (since 2011).

Both countries had the first interaction at the presidential level in 2011. The Colombian President Juan Manuel Santos made a visit to Turkey in 2011 while Turkish President Recep Tayyip Erdoğan visited Colombia on 10 February 2015.

Colombia had a commercial volume with Turkey of US$997 million in 2014. Colombia receives a sixth of Turkey's exports in Latin America, being the third country in terms of bilateral trade volume. Colombia and Turkey signed an agreement for trade cooperation in 2006. The negotiations for the signing of a free trade agreement also continued. Turkish Petroleum International Company at the Regional Office for South America began operations in 2008 in Bogotá. The visa requirement between the two countries was abolished in 2012.

== State visits ==
Guest	Host	Place of visit	Date of visit
(Colombia) President Juan Manuel Santos	(Turkey) President Abdullah Gül	Çankaya Köşkü, Ankara	November 18, 2011
(Turkey) President Recep Tayyip Erdoğan	(Colombia) President Juan Manuel Santos	Casa de Nariño, Bogotá	February 10, 2015

== See also ==
- Foreign relations of Colombia
- Foreign relations of Turkey
