= ROKS Iri =

Pohang-class corvette

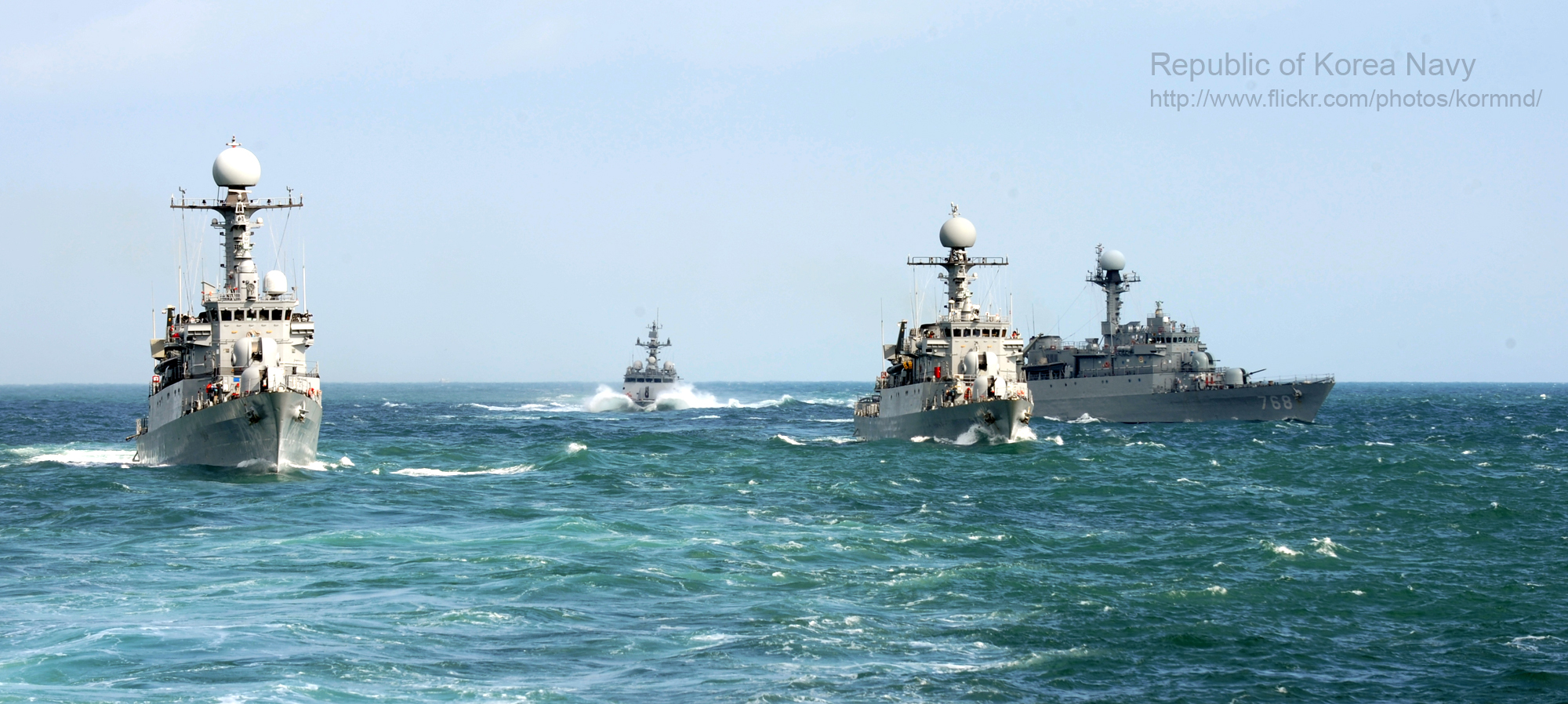
- ROKS Iksan on 2 October 2012

History

South Korea
- Name: Iri; (이리)
- Namesake: Iri; Iksan
- Builder: Hyundai, Ulsan
- Launched: 24 March 1987
- Commissioned: September 1988
- Decommissioned: 31 December 2018
- Renamed: Iksan; (익산)
- Home port: Jinhae
- Identification: Pennant number: PCC-768
- Fate: Donated to Colombian Navy

Colombia
- Name: Almirante Tono
- Namesake: Almirante Tono
- Christened: 6 january 2021
- Acquired: 24 November 2020
- Commissioned: 6 January 2021
- Home port: Cartagena
- Identification: MMSI number: 730152350; Callsign: 5KMX; Pennant number: CM-56
- Status: Active

General characteristics
- Class & type: Pohang-class corvette
- Displacement: 1,220 tons
- Length: 289.7 ft (88 m)
- Beam: 33 ft (10 m)
- Draft: 2.9 ft (0.88 m)
- Installed power: 2 × MTU 6V396 TC52 diesel generators
- Propulsion: Combined diesel or gas (CODOG) arrangement: 2 × MTU 12V956 TB82 diesel engines producing combined total of 6,260 shp (4,670 kW); 1 × General Electric LM2500 PB gas turbines generating 27,820 shp (20,700 kW)
- Speed: 32 knots (59 km/h; 37 mph) maximum
- Range: 4,000 nmi (7,400 km; 4,600 mi) at 15 knots (28 km/h; 17 mph) using diesel engines
- Endurance: 20 days
- Boats & landing craft carried: 2 × RHIB
- Crew: 118
- Sensors & processing systems: X-band & S-band navigational radars; Raytheon AN/SPS-64(V)5B surface search radar; Signaal (Thales Nederland) WM-28 Fire Control System; Signaal (Thales Nederland) LIOD optronic director; Raytheon AN/SQS-58 hull mounted passive/active sonar
- Electronic warfare & decoys: 2 × Loral Hycor Mk 34 RBOC Chaff and Decoy Launching System
- Armament: 2 × Oto Melara 76 mm/62 caliber Compact naval guns; 2 × Otobreda 40mm L/70 twin naval guns; 2 × Mk 32 triple torpedo tubes; 2 × Mk 9 Depth Charge Racks; 6 × M2HB Browning .50 caliber machine guns

ROKS Iri (PCC-768) was a Pohang-class corvette of the Republic of Korea Navy. Renamed ROKS Iksan in 1999. She was decommissioned and donated to the Colombian Navy under the name ARC Almirante Tono (CM-56) in 2016.

== Development and design ==
The Pohang class is a series of corvettes built by different Korean shipbuilding companies. The class consists of 24 ships and some after decommissioning were sold or given to other countries. There are five different types of designs in the class from Flight II to Flight VI.

== Construction and career ==
Iri was launched on 24 March 1987 by Hyundai Heavy Industries in Ulsan. The vessel was commissioned in September 1988. She was renamed Iksan in February 1999 and decommissioned on 31 December 2018. While in reserve at Jinhae on 28 September 2020, she was donated to Colombian Navy.

On 24 November 2020, she arrived in Cartagena with a new name ARC Almirante Tono (CM-56).

She was commissioned and christened on 6 January 2021. On 15 January, she began her first task on patrol to San Andrés, Providencia and Santa Catalina.

== Gallery ==
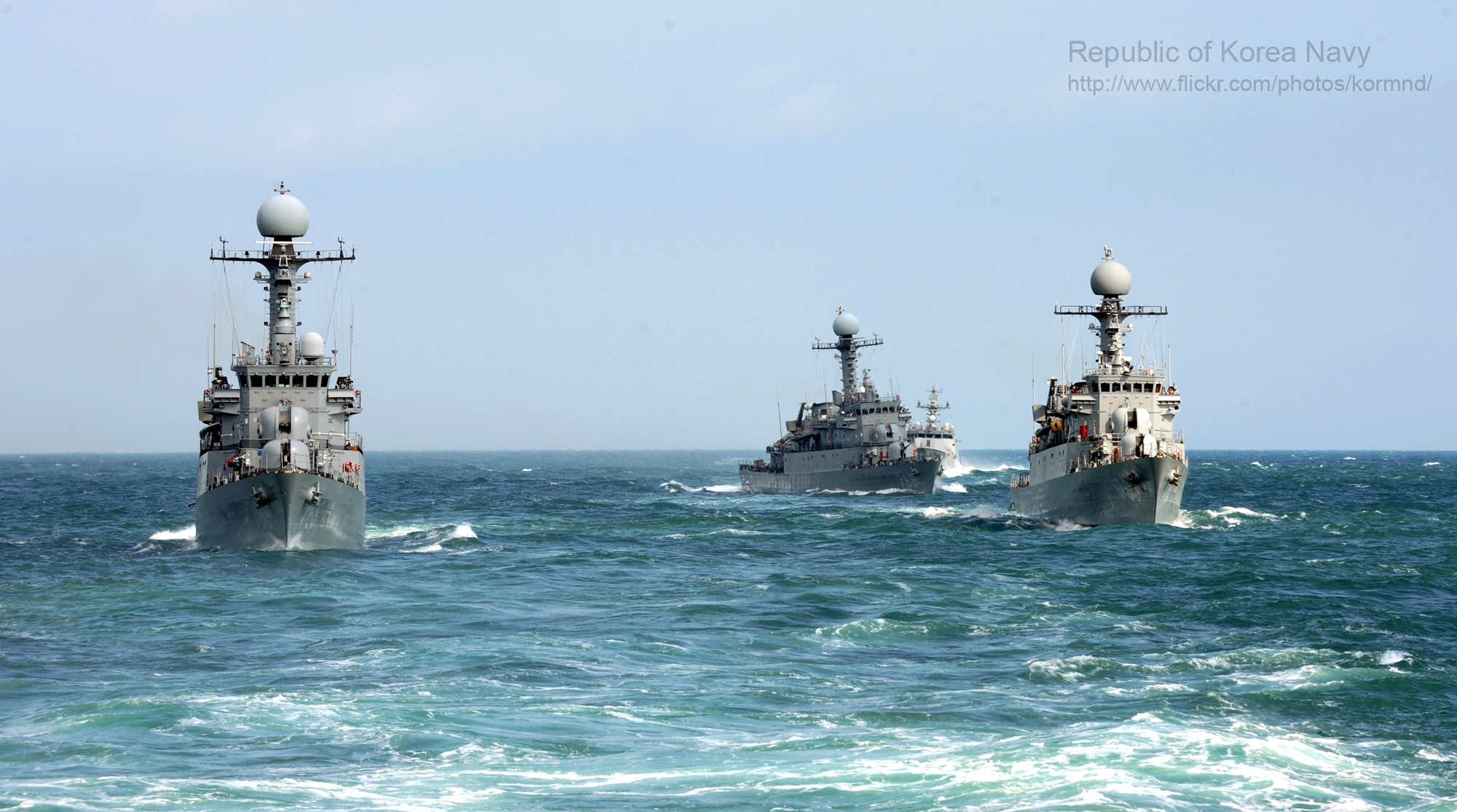
ROKS Iksan on 2 October 2012.
