= Colombia–Uruguay relations =

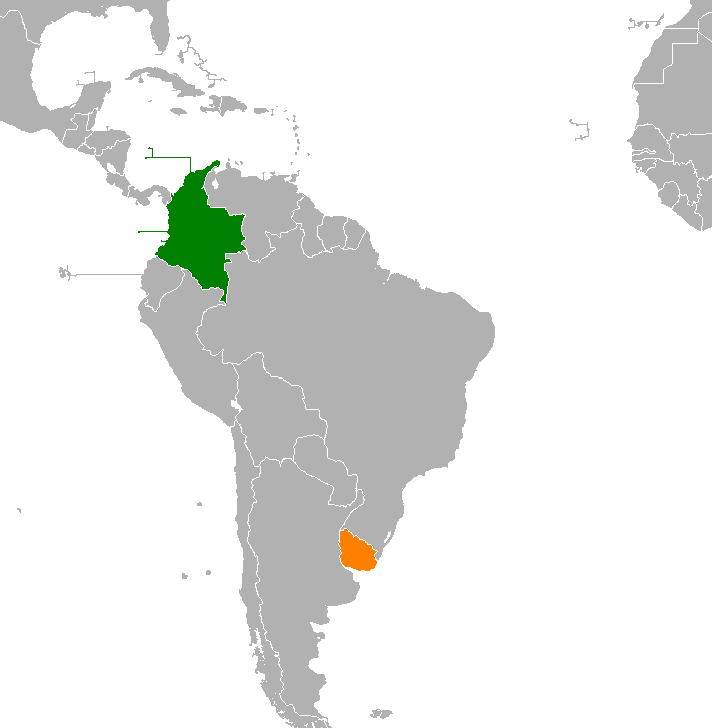
- Colombia: Uruguay

Colombia–Uruguay relations refers to the diplomatic relations between the Republic of Colombia and the Oriental Republic of Uruguay. Both nations are members of the Cairns Group, Community of Latin American and Caribbean States, Group of 77, Latin American Integration Association, Organization of American States, Organization of Ibero-American States and the United Nations.

== History ==
Both Colombia and Uruguay share a common history in the fact that both nations were once part of the Spanish Empire. During the Spanish colonial period, Colombia was governed by the Viceroyalty of New Granada in Bogotá while Uruguay was then part of the Viceroyalty of the Río de la Plata and administered from Buenos Aires. In 1819, the Viceroyalty of New Granada obtained its independence from Spain and became the Republic of New Granada. In 1863, Colombia became an independent country.

On 25 August 1888, both nations formally established diplomatic relations. In 1864, during the War of the Triple Alliance between Argentina, Brazil, Paraguay and Uruguay; Colombia morally supported Paraguay and protested against the war.

Both nations partake in various multilateral South American summits and have had several high-level bilateral meetings. In March 2020, Colombian President Iván Duque Márquez visited Uruguay to attend the inauguration of President Luis Lacalle Pou. While in Uruguay, President Duque also met with business leaders to promote and increase trade between the two nations.

== Bilateral agreements ==
Both nations have signed several bilateral agreements such as an Agreement on the Exchange of Teachers and Students and on the Equivalence of Titles and Certificates of Study (1922); Agreement of Visa Suppression between holders of ordinary passports (1966); Air Agreement (1979); Cultural Agreement (1985); Agreement for Scientific and Technical Cooperation (1989); Memorandum of Intent on Cooperation in Industrial Property Matters (1995); Social Security Agreement (1998); Judicial Cooperation Agreement in Criminal Matters (1998); Agreement on Reciprocal Assistance on Cooperation and Collaboration in the Fight Against Illicit Traffic in Narcotic Drugs and Psychotropic Substances and their Abuse (1998); Agreement for the Protection and Restitution of Cultural Assets and other Specific Imported, Exported or Illegally Transferred Objects (2008); Agreement on Consular Cooperation (2021); and an Agreement to Avoid Double Taxation and Prevent Tax Evasion (2021).

== Transportation ==
There are direct flights between both nations with Avianca.

== Resident diplomatic missions ==
- Colombia has an embassy in Montevideo.
- Uruguay has an embassy in Bogotá.
