= List of ambassadors of Paraguay to Colombia =

Coordinates: 4.656429°N 74.058417°W

Ambassador of Paraguay to Colombia
- Coat of Arms of Paraguay
- Inaugural holder: Tomás A. Salomoni
- Formation: 1931

The Paraguayan ambassador in Bogotá is the official representative of the Government in Asunción to the Government of Colombia.

== List of representatives ==
Diplomatic accreditation	Ambassador	Observations	President of Paraguay	List of presidents of Colombia	Term end
1931	Tomás A. Salomoni	Minister Plenipotentiary with concurrent accreditation in Mexico and Cuba	José Patricio Guggiari	Enrique Olaya Herrera	1934
1936	Anselmo Jóver Peralta	Minister Plenipotentiary with concurrent accreditation in Mexico and Cuba	Rafael Franco	Alfonso López Pumarejo	1937
1951	José Dahlquist		Raimundo Rolón	Roberto Urdaneta Arbeláez	1953
1954	Esteban López Martínez		Alfredo Stroessner	Gustavo Rojas Pinilla	1953
1956	Guillermo Enciso Velloso		Alfredo Stroessner	Gustavo Rojas Pinilla	1960
1961	Fernando Vallejo		Alfredo Stroessner	Alberto Lleras Camargo	1962
1962	Bacón Duarte Prado		Alfredo Stroessner	Guillermo León Valencia	1965
1966	Francisco Barreiro Maffiodo		Alfredo Stroessner	Carlos Lleras Restrepo	1972
1973	Aníbal Mezquita Vera		Alfredo Stroessner	Misael Pastrana Borrero	1978
1980	Rubén Ruiz		Alfredo Stroessner	Julio César Turbay Ayala	1989
1991	Gerardo Fogel		Andrés Rodríguez	César Gaviria Trujillo	1993
1994	Antonia Núñez de López		Juan Carlos Wasmosy	Ernesto Samper Pizano	1995
1995	Nelson Alcides Mora Rodas		Juan Carlos Wasmosy	Ernesto Samper Pizano	2003
2003	Felipe Robertti Cardozo		Nicanor Duarte Frutos	Álvaro Uribe Vélez	2008
2009	Walter Biedermann Montaner		Fernando Armindo Lugo Méndez	Álvaro Uribe Vélez	2013
2013	Ricardo Scavone Yegros		Federico Franco	Juan Manuel Santos	June 22, 2018
April 4, 2019	Martha Sophia López Garelli	daughter of Mario López Escobar, from May 16, 1977 to October 15, 1983 Paraguayan ambassador to the United States.	Mario Abdo Benítez	Iván Duque Márquez	August 7, 2022
