= Latin American Economic System =

Latin American and Caribbean intergovernmental organization

Latin American Economic System Sistema Económico Latinoamericano y del Caribe
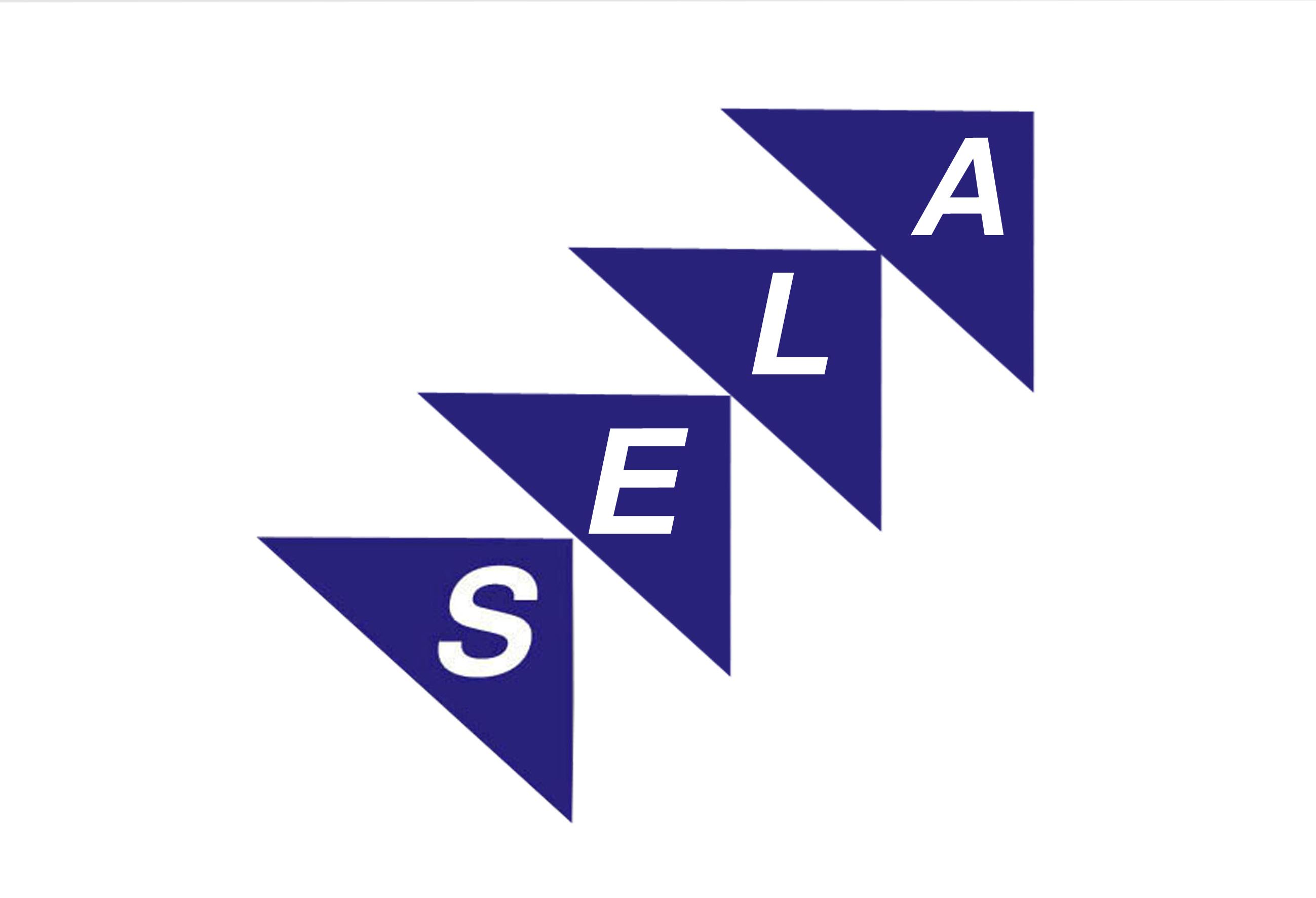
- Flag

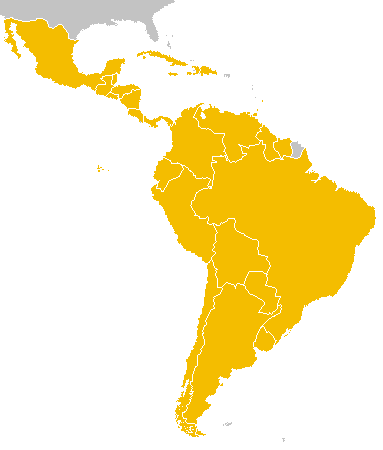
- Member nations in Yellow
- Administrative center: Caracas, Venezuela
- Website http://www.sela.org/

The Latin American and the Caribbean Economic System, officially known as Sistema Económico Latinoamericano y del Caribe (SELA), is an organization founded in 1975 to promote economic cooperation and social development between Latin American and the Caribbean countries. In the early 1990s, its representatives consisted of members from 28 countries and took part in the General Agreement on Tariffs and Trade (GATT) negotiations, which led to a new global agreement on restrictions on trade and established the World Trade Organization (WTO).

The Latin American Council represents SELA's policy-making body and meets once a year. The main administrative body is the secretariat, located in Caracas, Venezuela.

== Objectives ==
International relations scholar Sheldon Liss, in Diplomacy and Dependency: Venezuela, the United States, and the Americas (1978) described the initial objectives of SELA:

SELA, composed of twenty-five member states, and to which Venezuela contributes the largest share (17 per cent) of the budget, hopes to: restructure international commerce in basic commodities in order to raise developing states' export values, improve trade conditions, stimulate industrial development, control foreign-based transnational corporations, create Latin American multinational companies which will use to better advantage the human, technological, and financial resources of the area, sponsor organizations to process and market raw materials, improve the negotiating power of the member states, and plan joint economic strategies.

SELA members deem it likely that Venezuelan oil wealth will permit them easy access to petrodollars for use as finance capital. (pp 271, 2.)

== Member countries ==
A clickable Euler diagram showing the relationships between various multinational organizations in the Americas

- Argentina
- Bahamas
- Barbados
- Belize
- Bolivia
- Brazil
- Chile
- Colombia
- Costa Rica
- Cuba
- Dominican Republic
- Ecuador
- El Salvador
- Grenada
- Guatemala
- Guyana
- Haiti
- Honduras
- Jamaica
- Mexico
- Nicaragua
- Panama
- Paraguay
- Peru
- Suriname
- Trinidad and Tobago
- Uruguay
- Venezuela

== See also ==
- Andean Community
- Association of Caribbean States
- Caribbean Community
- Central American Integration System
- Community of Latin American and Caribbean States
- Latin American economy
- Latin American Integration Association
- Latin American Parliament
- Mercosur
- Pacific Alliance
- Union of South American Nations
