= Colombia–Indonesia relations =

- Colombia: Indonesia

Colombia and Indonesia established diplomatic relations in 1980. Both are members of the Non-Aligned Movement, the Pacific Economic Cooperation Council, the Cairns Group, and the CIVETS block. Indonesia has an embassy in Bogotá, while Colombia has an embassy in Jakarta.

== History ==
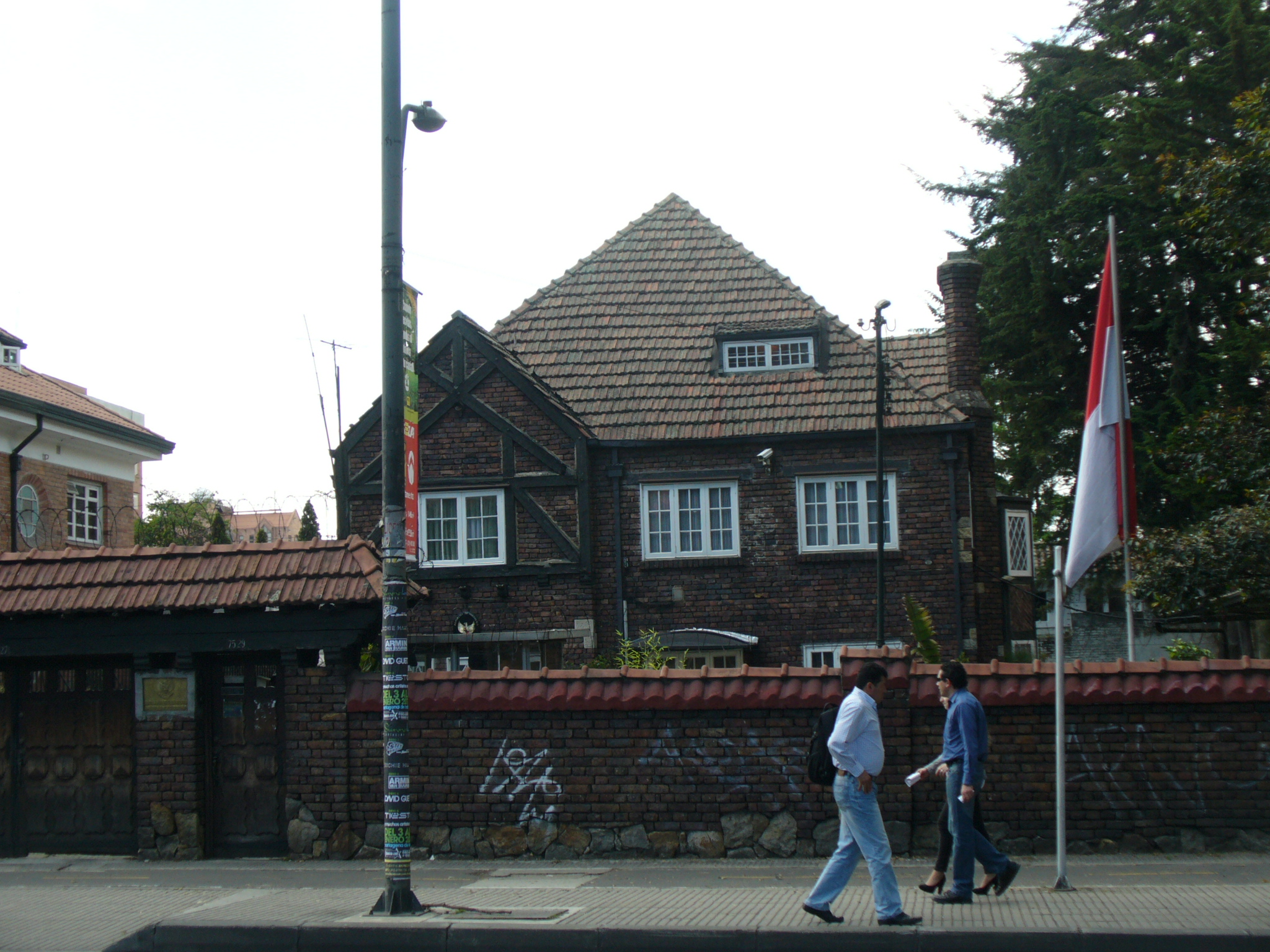
Indonesian Embassy in Bogotá

Established on 15 September 1980, diplomatic relations were handled at the time by the Embassy of Indonesia in Brasília, Brazil and the Embassy of Colombia in New Delhi, India respectively. In 1983, Colombia elevated its consulate in Jakarta to embassy, and remained in the country until 29 November 2002 when the embassy closed due to budget reasons as part of a wider restructuring by the Colombian Ministry of Foreign Affairs. Indonesia opened its embassy in Bogotá in May 1989 and the first ambassador of Indonesia to Colombia, Dr. Trenggono, presented his letter of credence to President Virgilio Barco Vargas on 16 June 1989 and has maintained an ambassadorial presence in Colombia ever since.

On 7 March 2011 President of Colombia, Juan Manuel Santos Calderón announced the reopening of the Colombian Embassy in Jakarta as part of a campaign to promote the CIVETS economic block, of which Colombia and Indonesia are part of as emerging markets with similar economic background, and in an effort to strengthen ties with Indonesia and Asia in general.

== See also ==
- Foreign relations of Colombia
- Foreign relations of Indonesia
