= Clinedinst =

Clinedinst is a surname. Notable people with the name include:

- Barnett M. Clinedinst (1835–1900), American photographer and inventor
- Barnett McFee Clinedinst (1862–1953) official White House photographer
- Benjamin West Clinedinst (1859–1931), American illustrator and portrait painter
