= Barnett Clinedinst =

Barnett Clinedinst may refer to:

- Barnett M. Clinedinst (1835–1900), American photographer and inventor
- Barnett McFee Clinedinst (1862–1953), official White House photographer
