= Colombian displacement crisis =

Flag of Colombia

Colombia currently has one of the highest populations of internally displaced people (IDPS), at a total amount of over 6.8 million. The majority of IDPS have been displaced due to conflict and violence while others have been displaced due to climate change. Primary contributors to violence include political violence and civil war as well as gang violence. Despite a 2016 peace agreement, political dissident groups have persisted in Colombia, contributing to violence rate similar to those prior to the peace agreement. The Venezuelan refugee crisis has contributed to economic strains and aid requirements in Colombia. Colombia has received aid from organizations like the UNHCR or USAID to help manage humanitarian needs.

== History ==
=== Conflict ===
The war in Colombia, also known as the Colombian conflict, started in 1964 during the Cold War. Between 1958 and 2013, more than 200,000 people died in the conflict in Colombia, with 81% being civilians. The government in Colombia has been in conflict with several insurgent groups and ideological factions during this period. The Revolutionary Armed Forces of Colombia (or FARC short for Fuerzas Armadas Revolucionarias de Colombia in Spanish) and the National Liberation Army (or ELN short for Ejercito de Liberacion Nacional in Spanish) were two of the primary insurgent groups, with the FARC being the largest. Both groups were founded in the 1960s after a period of political violence known as La Violencia.

During La Violencia, a civil war that took place between 1948-1964, 2 million people fled from violence. La Violencia played a major role in the formation of insurgent groups in Colombia.

==== Peace agreement ====
In 2016, the Colombian government and the FARC signed a peace agreement to end the decades long conflict. In 2017, the UN oversaw a demobilization and disarmament process of the FARC which has transitioned into a legal political party. However, after the demobilization of the FARC, there has been an increase in fighting and violence over vacated FARC territory by groups such as the ELN, Popular Liberation Army (EPL), the Gaitanist Self-Defense Forces of Colombia (AGC), and other dissident groups. 2022 saw similar levels of violence that existed before the peace agreement, and there has been an increase of more than 1,000,000 IDPs since its signing in 2016.

== Contributors ==
Flag of the Revolutionary Armed Forces of Colombia

=== Violence ===
==== Political violence and civil war ====
According to the Organization of American States, "The vast majority of civil organizations in Colombia agree that the root cause of displacement is political violence (the State versus guerrilla groups)". During 2021, there was a 70% recorded increase in organized political violence in Colombia as compared to the year prior, and the 2022 electoral period was noted as the most violent in the last decade. State by ACLED, "In Bolívar and Sucre departments, where the Gulf Clan maintains a heavy presence, incidents of violence targeting civilians doubled in the first half of 2022 compared to the entirety of 2021.

Currently, the ELN is a large contributor to violence, as they weren't part of the 2016 peace agreement. The ELN has been involved in various forms of criminal activity, including extortion, oil infrastructure attacks, kidnapping, and have recently become involved in the international drug trade. By July, the ELN had reportedly kidnapped at least 15 people during 2023, although the number may actually be higher. However, on August 3, 2023, the ELN agreed to a sixth month ceasefire to aid in the process of establishing a permanent peace agreement. This cease fire can be extended in January 2024 if progress is made during negotiations. As of December, 2023, the ELN has agreed to halt kidnappings as a fund-raising tactic if the cease fire is extended. They currently have an estimated 38 people captive and it is unclear whether or not they will be released.

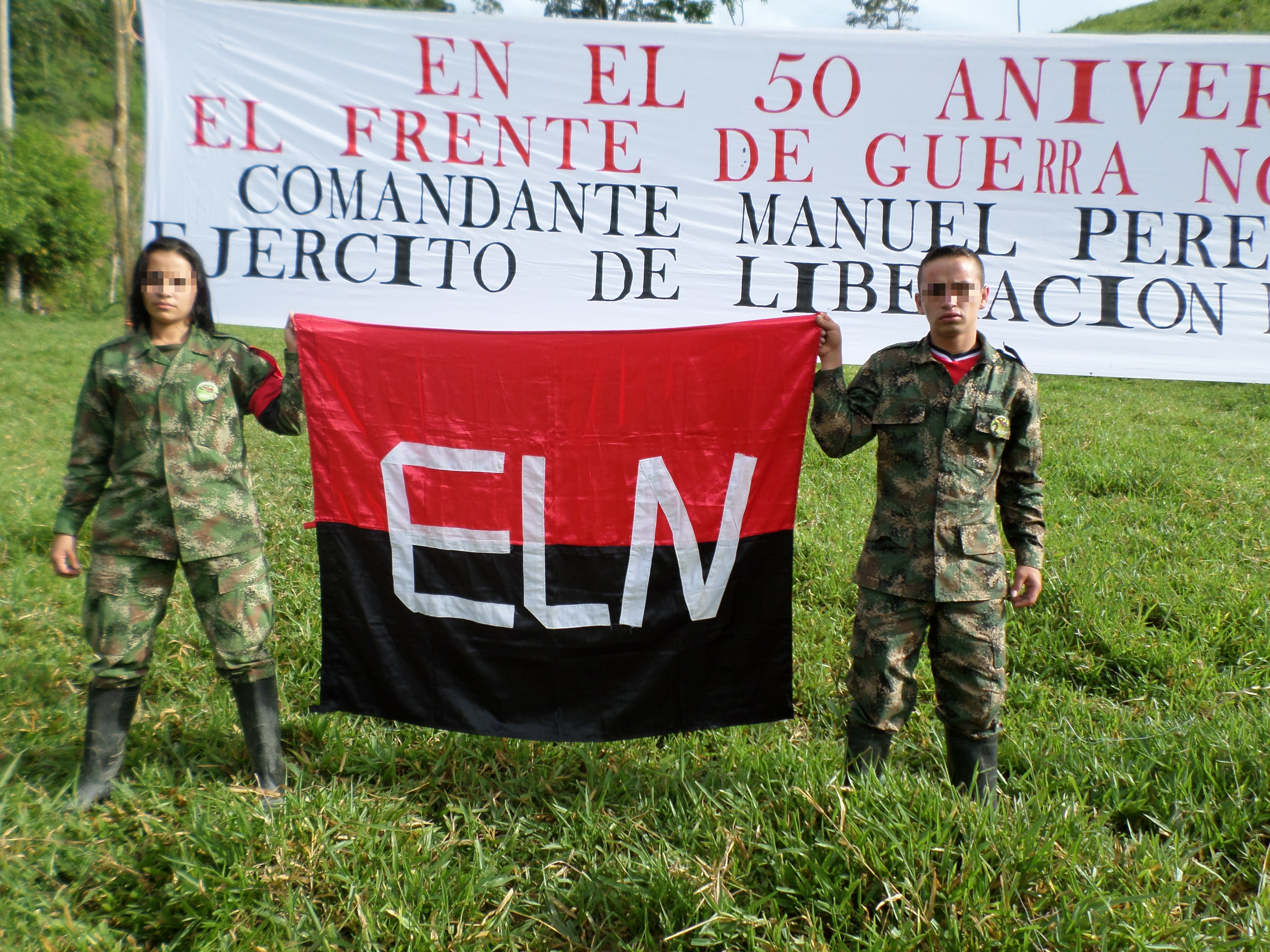
Flag of the National Liberation Army (ELN)

==== Gang violence ====
Colombia is the largest exporter of cocaine in the world. While there was a decrease in coca cultivation in Colombia from 2017-2020 (171,000 hectares of farmland producing coca bush down to 142,800 hectares), cultivation has been increasing since 2021, with reported 230,000 hectares of farmland growing coca bush in 2022. The Gaitanistas, also known as the Gulf Clan, is one of Colombia's strongest criminal groups, with their primary focus being transnational drug trade. Competition over drug territory has led to conflicts between the Gaitanistas and other groups such as the ELN and ex-FARC Mafia.

The departments of Norte de Santander and Cauca are epicenters of violence in Colombia, being driven by competition over coca crops and drugs, weapons, and human trafficking routes along the borders of Venezuela and the Pacific Coast. 2020 saw an increase in violence against civilians as groups had taken advantage of covid protocol measures to expand territory, and as a result has increased conflict levels between groups as well as violence against civilians. Thousands of people have had to leave their homes because of armed groups in Colombia, including the ELN and Gulf Clan, fighting over territory. Over 21,000 people in conflict heavy areas have been reportedly displaced between January and October 2020.

=== Venezuelan migration ===
Venezuela is currently facing their own refugee crisis, and at least 7.7 million refugees and migrants have left Venezuela. Colombia was noted as hosting close to 3 million Venezuelan refugees in October 2022. While Colombia had largely welcomed and provided support to Venezuelans, change in government leadership in August 2022 has seen a pullback on support. The lack of economic support puts Venezuelans in Colombia in the position of facing exploitation, migrating to another city or country, and being recruited by criminal groups. Historically, Colombians have fled to Venezuela due to economic insecurities in Colombia. In 2015, thousands had to return to Colombia after a blame on Colombians for violence and widespread shortages. According to the UNHCR, at the end of 2022, "Colombia has also received more than half a million Colombians returning from the Bolivarian Republic of Venezuela."

=== Environmental impacts ===
Colombia faces different environmental impacts, such as hurricanes, drought, and environmental degradation forcing people to leave their homes. According to Climate Refugees, "People displaced by the effects of climate change in Colombia could soon receive legal recognition under a landmark bill that passed the first stage in Congress,". Additionally, "the Norwegian Refugee Council estimates nearly 800,000 Colombians are dependent on humanitarian services due to climate change-induced impacts,".

Colombia faces high vulnerability to climate change. Populations in the Andes are at risk of both increased precipitation rates and droughts, while those in the coastal regions face increases in flooding and erosion. Climate disasters put Colombia's economy at risk, with potential to impact livestock, farmlands, and infrastructure. According the World Bank Group, "84 percent of the population and 86 percent of its assets in areas exposed to two or more hazards,".

== Rates of displacement ==
=== Internal displacement ===
By mid-2023, there were 6.9 million IDPs reported in Colombia. 4.8 million people are internally displaced in Colombia as a result of violence and conflict. In the Internal Displacement Monitoring Center's Severity Assessment report, they found that out of the 13 countries assessed, Colombia was found to have the most significant disparities, with a larger number of internally displaced households facing challenges and risks. According to the UNHCR, "Indigenous populations and Afro-Colombians account for 75 per cent of people affected by large-group internal displacements, and for more than 85 per cent of the communities affected by confinement,".

=== External migration ===
Colombia has the highest number of emigrants out of all South American countries. According to Migration Policy, "More than 500,000 people left Colombia in 2022,". When looking at Colombians who migrated to Organization for Economic Co-operation and Development (OECD) countries, most migrants came from, "Bogota 18.27%, Antioquia 13.79%, Cauca Valley 10.16%, Cundinamarca 5.56%, and Santander 4.72%,".

== Responses ==
=== Aid ===
Colombia receives humanitarian aid from several different sources. USAID, "identified 7.7 million people in need of humanitarian assistance," in Colombia. In response to the Venezuelan crisis in Colombia, USAID/BHA has provided more than $616 million since 2018. USAID/BHA has also provided emergency food assistance to aid the internally displaced population in Colombia. In the 2023 fiscal year, USAID/BHA provided $47,500,000 in emergency funding and $2,000,000 in early recovery, risk reduction, and resilience as of May 10, 2023. The total amount of funding provided in the 2022 fiscal year by USAID/BHA was $145,674,809.

The UN Office for the Coordination of Humanitarian Affairs (UNOCHA) has identified needed aid amount at $283.3 million USD in 2023. The current funding total is $127.9 million, completing 45.14% coverage. The top five donors are the United States ($77.8 million), European Commission ($15.6 million), Central Emergency Response Fund ($6.5 million), Sweden ($4.3 million), and Germany ($4 million).

=== Intaking countries ===
Many Colombian migrants have attempted to enter the U.S. through the U.S.-Mexico border. Numbers of encounters of Colombians at the U.S.-Mexico border increased from 6,200 in 2021, to 125,200 in 2022, to 126,200 in the first eight months of 2023. According to the U.S. Census Bureau American Community Survey (ACS), "close to 855,000 Colombian immigrants resided in the United States," in 2022. When looking at emigration of Colombians to OECD countries, "Approximately 57% of this group migrated to Spain, 16% to Chile and 14% to the United States," in 2019.

Colombian refugees are primarily located in Venezuela, Chile, and Ecuador. While the USA, Canada, and Europe are the primary destinations for Colombian refugees, the majority are located in Ecuador. According to Integral Human Development, the primary countries granting refuge to Colombians in 2012 include, "Ecuador (54,243), the USA (22,004), Canada (17,243), Costa Rica (10,297), Venezuela (1,941), Panama (1,598), Chile (924), Spain (664), Brazil (664), the UK (564), Argentina (456), France (455), Italy (387) and others,".
