= Colombian New Zealanders =

Total population
- 4,534

Regions with significant populations
- Auckland, Waikato, Wellington, South Island

Languages
- New Zealand English, Colombian Spanish

Colombian New Zealanders (Spanish: Colombianos-Neozelandeses) are residents of New Zealand whose ancestry can be traced back to Colombia, in South America.

In 2023, it was estimated that 3,960 individuals residing in New Zealand were born in Colombia, whilst some other 534 declared New Zealand their birthplace along with their Colombian background based on the 2018 census, although these numbers may have varied throughout time.

Most Colombian New Zealanders live in North Island, especially in the Auckland area, the Waikato region and Wellington-Lower Hutt.

Other sizable amounts of Colombian New Zealanders can also be found in South Island, especially in the Nelson region, where most of them on the island reside, followed by the Canterbury region and Otago region, especially in the Ashburton District, Queenstown-Lakes District and Central Otago District, although there's growing populations all over the island, with Invercargill being a prime example of another place of settlement for Colombian New Zealanders in South Island.

Colombian immigration to New Zealand increased in the 1980s following political upheaval affecting financial stability and safety in Colombia. A notable big wave of Colombian migration to the country had surfaced during the late 2000s era, along with waves of other Latin American migrants especially coming from Brazil, Mexico, Argentina, Chile, Uruguay, Venezuela, Peru, Ecuador, Bolivia, Puerto Rico, Cuba and the Dominican Republic.

== See also ==
- Colombia–New Zealand relations
- Colombian diaspora
- Immigration to New Zealand
- Colombian Australians
