= Benjamin West Clinedinst =

American painter and illustrator

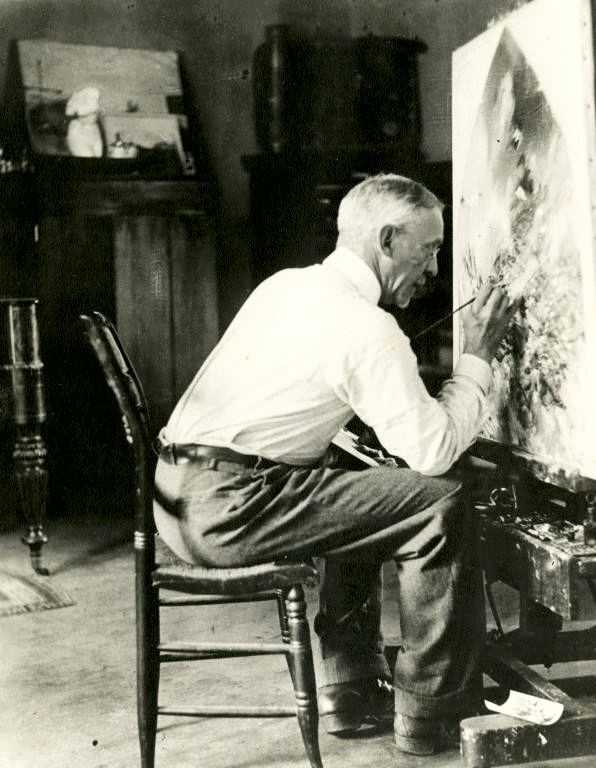
- Born: October 14, 1859; Woodstock, Virginia, US
- Died: September 12, 1931 (aged 71); Pawling, New York
- Education: Virginia Military Institute
- Spouse: Emily Gertrude Waters
- Parent(s): Barnett M. Clinedinst; Mary C. South
- Relatives: Barnett McFee Clinedinst, Jr., brother

Benjamin West Clinedinst (October 14, 1859 – September 12, 1931) was an American book illustrator and portrait painter. The New International Encyclopedia considered that his "sympathetic collaboration" with the authors of the books he illustrated gave his works "a special charm".

== Biography ==
Clinedinst was born to Barnett M. Clinedinst and Mary C. South on October 14, 1859, in Woodstock, Virginia. His father was a photographer and inventor who named him after painter Benjamin West. Clinedinst attended Virginia Military Institute in Lexington, Virginia. He studied for a year in Baltimore, and for five years in Paris under Cabanel and Bonnat.

He first attracted attention in New York City with his illustrations for Leslie's Weekly. He exhibited two works – The Water Colorist and Monsieur's Mail – at the 1893 World's Columbian Exposition in Chicago.

Clinedinst painted a mural of Virginia Military Institute cadets at the 1864 Battle of New Market. The 1913 mural is on display in V.M.I.'s Jackson Memorial Hall.

In 1894, he was elected into the National Academy of Design as an Associate Academician, and became a full Academician in 1898. He was awarded the Evans prize of the American Watercolor Society in 1900.

Clinedinst died on September 12, 1931, in Pawling, New York.

== Memorial medal ==
In 1947 the nonprofit Artists' Fellowship, Inc. established the Benjamin West Clinedinst Memorial Medal for exceptional artistic merit. Past winners include William H. Bailey, Will Barnet, Stanley Bleifeld, Paul Bransom, Paul Cadmus, Lois Dodd, Jane Freilicher, Robert Beverly Hale, Paul Jenkins, Morton Kaish, Everett Raymond Kinstler, Robert Kipniss, Knox Martin, Louise Nevelson, Pat Oliphant, Philip Pearlstein, and Norman Rockwell.

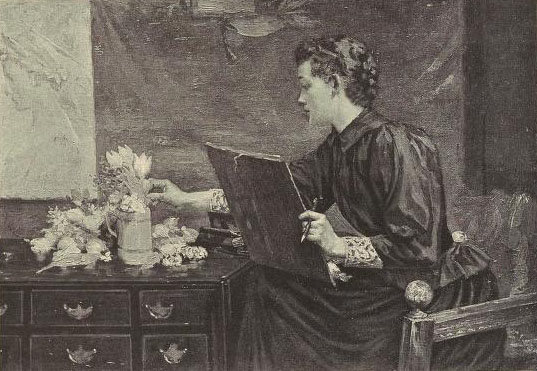
The Water Colorist (c.1891)

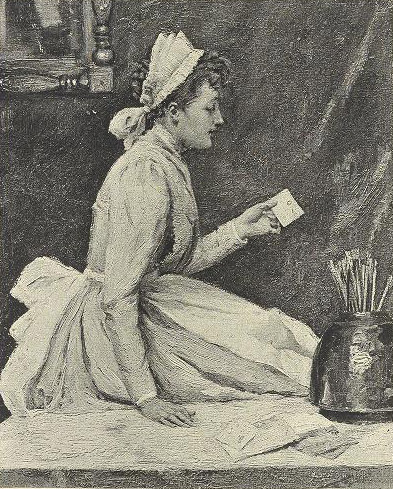
Monsieur's Mail (c.1893)

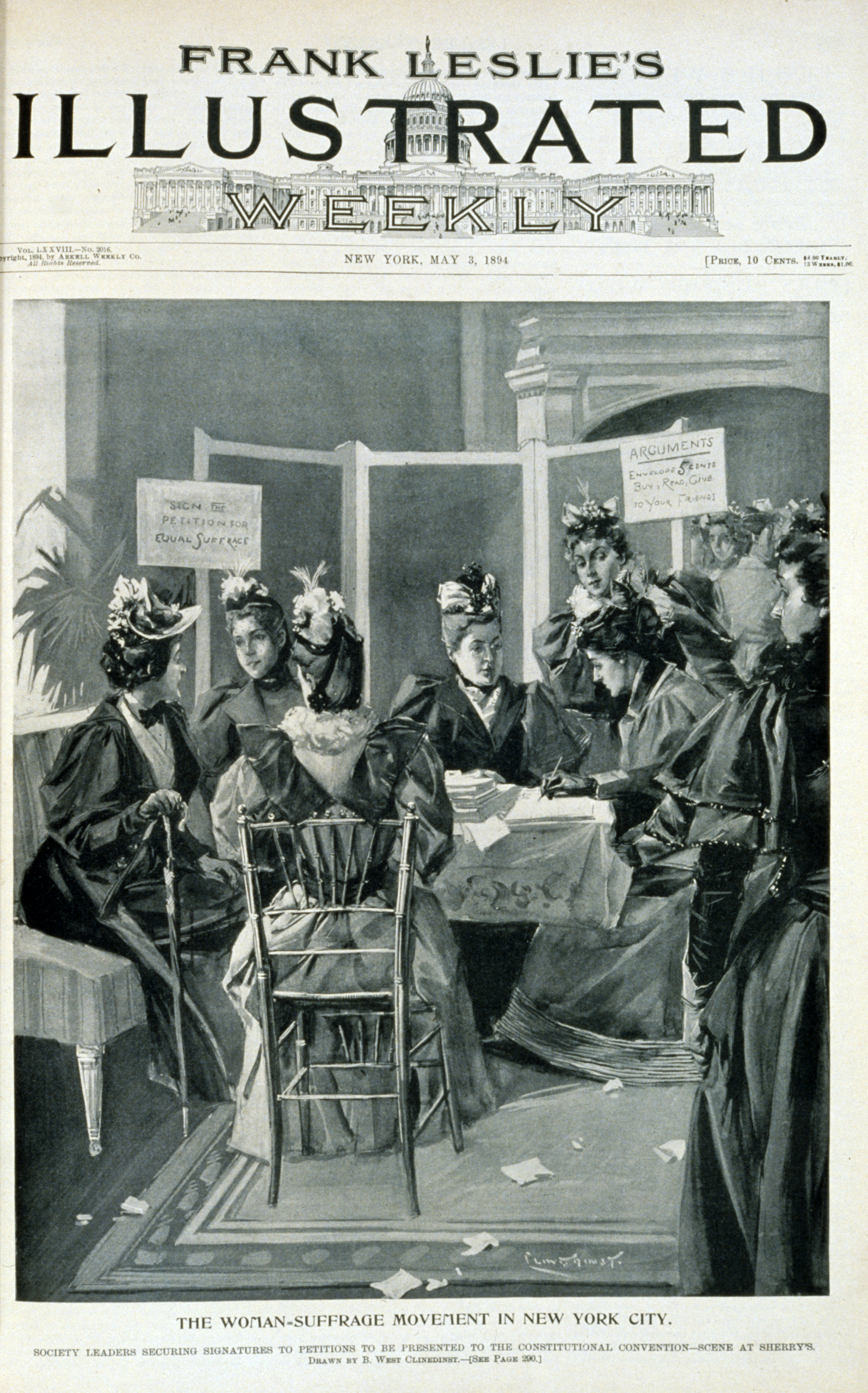
The Woman-Suffrage Movement in New York City (1894)

== See also ==
- List of American painters exhibited at the 1893 World's Columbian Exposition
