= Colombia–New Zealand relations =

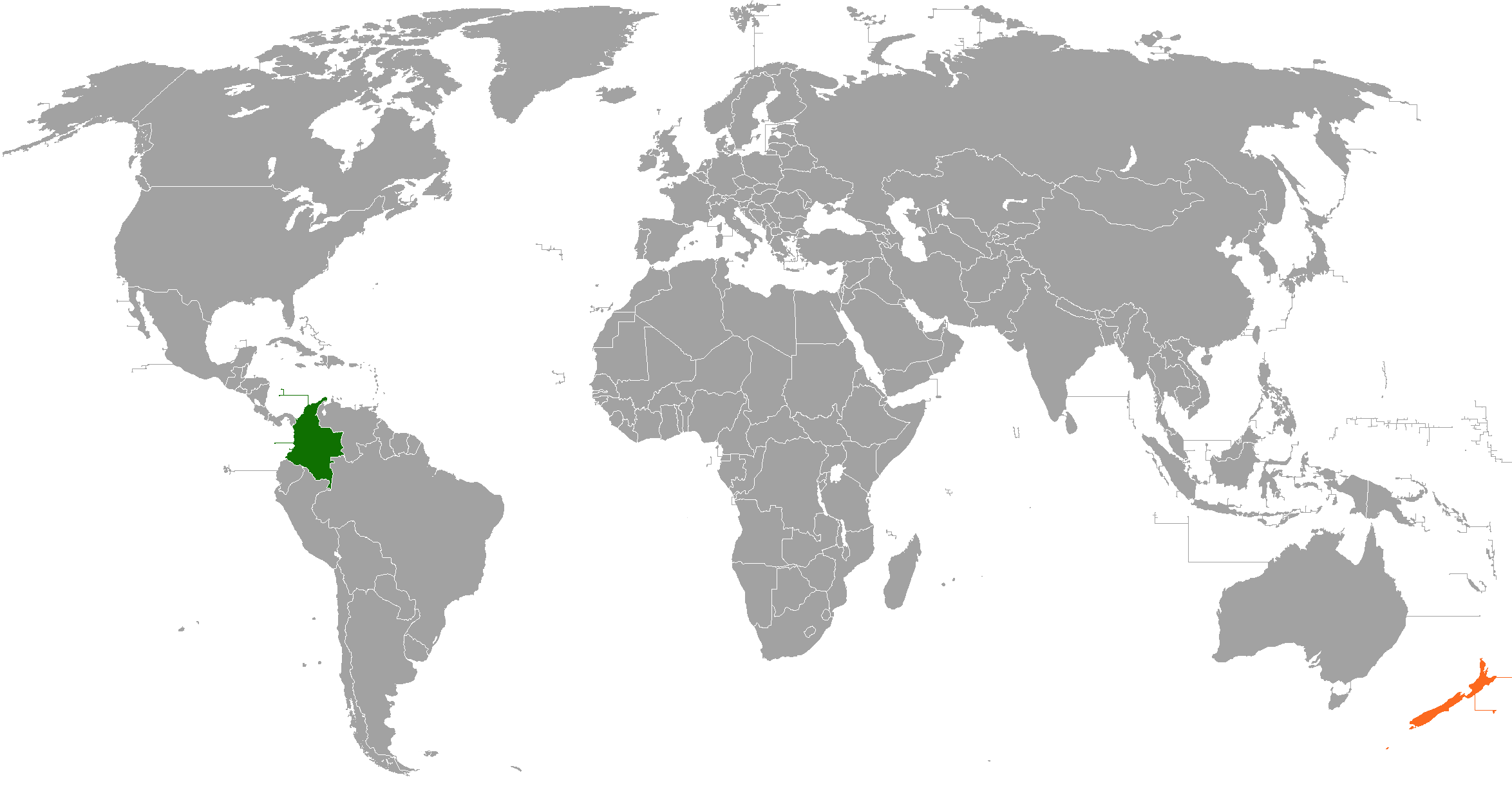

- Colombia: New Zealand

Colombia–New Zealand relations are the bilateral relations between Colombia and New Zealand.

== History ==
On 1 May 1978, Colombia and New Zealand established diplomatic relations. Since the initiation of diplomatic relations, relations between both nations took place in mostly multinational organizations such as at the United Nations. In May 2013, New Zealand Prime Minister John Key paid an official visit to Colombia, becoming the first New Zealand head-of-government to do so. During his visit with Colombian President Juan Manuel Santos, Prime Minister Key pledged that New Zealand would invest $3.4 million USD over four years to develop agriculture in Colombia. There would also be annual "consultations" between officials of both countries.

In 2016, Colombia signed a peace agreement with the Revolutionary Armed Forces of Colombia (FARC). New Zealand has contributed $1 million USD to humanitarian de-mining efforts in Colombia and is working with the HALO Trust to use technology developed in New Zealand to remove and dispose of mines safely.

Since 2012, New Zealand has been an active observer of the Pacific Alliance which includes Colombia, Chile, Mexico and Peru. New Zealand launched negotiations towards a high-quality and comprehensive free trade agreement (FTA) with the Pacific Alliance in June 2017. Once negotiations are concluded and the FTA is in force, New Zealand will become an Associated State of the Pacific Alliance. In 2017, a bilateral Air Services Agreement was signed between both nations.

In February 2018, New Zealand opened its first resident embassy in Bogotá. In March 2025, Colombia re-opened its embassy in Wellington.

== High-level visits ==
High-level visits from Colombia to New Zealand

- Foreign Vice Minister Patti Londoño (2013)

High-level visits from New Zealand to Colombia

- Prime Minister John Key (2013)
- Trade Minister Tim Groser (2013)
- Foreign Minister Gerry Brownlee (2017)
- Trade Minister Todd McClay (2017)
- Foreign Under-Secretary Fletcher Tabuteau (2018)

== Trade ==
In 2017, trade between Colombia and New Zealand totaled $45 million USD. Colombia's main exports to New Zealand include: coffee, tea, mate and spices. New Zealand's main exports to Colombia include: confectionery and technical instruments. Over the years, New Zealand companies have been targeting Colombian opportunities in agribusiness, food processing, retail (food and beverage, fuel), construction, aviation, and health.

== Resident diplomatic missions ==
- Colombia has an embassy in Wellington and a consulate-general in Auckland.
- New Zealand has an embassy in Bogotá.

== See also ==
- Foreign relations of Colombia
- Foreign relations of New Zealand
- Colombian New Zealanders
