= Philip Pearlstein =

American painter (1924–2022)

- Born: Philip Martin Pearlstein; May 24, 1924; Pittsburgh, Pennsylvania, U.S.
- Died: December 17, 2022 (aged 98); New York City, U.S.
- Education: Carnegie Institute of Technology; New York University Institute of Fine Arts
- Notable work: Nudes
- Movement: Realism
- Awards: National Academy Museum and School: Design, Obrig Prize & Lifetime Achievement Awards; Fulbright-Hays Scholarship; Guggenheim Fellowship; Rome Prize
- Website: philippearlstein.com

Philip Martin Pearlstein (May 24, 1924 – December 17, 2022) was an American painter best known for Modernist Realist nudes. Cited by critics as the preeminent figure painter of the 1960s to 2000s, he led a revival in realist art.

== Biography ==
Pearlstein was born on May 24, 1924, in Pittsburgh, Pennsylvania, to David and Libby Kalser Pearlstein. During the Great Depression, his parents sold chickens and eggs to support the family. As a child his parents supported his interest in art, sending him to Saturday morning classes at Pittsburgh's Carnegie Museum of Art. In 1942, when he was 18, two of his paintings won a national competition sponsored by Scholastic Magazine, and were reproduced in color in Life magazine. He graduated from Taylor Allderdice High School in 1942.

In 1942, he enrolled at Carnegie Institute of Technology's art school, in Pittsburgh, where he painted two portraits of his parents now held by the Carnegie Museum of Art, but after one year he was drafted in 1943 by the U.S. Army to serve during World War II. He was initially assigned to the Training Aids Unit at Camp Blanding, Florida, where he produced charts, weapon assembly diagrams, and signs. In this role, he learned printmaking and the screenprinting process, and subsequently was stationed in Italy making road signs. While in Italy, he took in as much renaissance art as was accessible in Rome, Florence, Venice, and Milan, and also produced over 100 drawings and watercolors depicting life in the Army.

In 1946, sponsored by the G.I. Bill, he returned to Carnegie Institute where one of his fellow students was the artist's future wife, Dorothy Cantor. Another fellow student was Andy Warhol, who was attracted to Pearlstein because of his notoriety in the school, his high school paintings having been featured in Life magazine. During the summer of 1947, the three rented a barn as a summer studio. Immediately after graduating in June 1949 with a BFA, Pearlstein and Warhol moved to New York City, at first sharing an eighth-floor walkup tenement apartment on St. Mark's Place at Avenue A. He was eventually hired by Czech designer Ladislav Sutnar, mainly doing industrial catalog work, while Warhol immediately found work illustrating department store catalogs. In April 1950, they moved to 323 W. 21st Street, into an apartment rented by Franziska Marie Boas, who ran a dance class on the other side of the room. During this time, Pearlstein painted a portrait of Warhol, now held by the Whitney Museum of American Art.

Male and Female Nudes with Red and Purple Drape, 1968, Hirshhorn Museum

In 1950, Philip Pearlstein married Dorothy Cantor, with Andy Warhol in the wedding party. The Pearlsteins moved to East 4th Street, taking over an apartment from fellow figure painter Lester Johnson, and Philip enrolled in the Masters in Art History program at New York University Institute of Fine Arts. His thesis was on artist Francis Picabia, evaluating Cubism, Abstract art, Dada and Surrealism, graduating in 1955.

After graduation, he was hired by Life magazine to do page layouts, and was then awarded a Fulbright Hays fellowship, enabling him to return to Italy for a year, where he painted a series of landscapes. From 1959 to 1963, he was an instructor at Pratt Institute, in Brooklyn, New York, and subsequently spent a year as a Visiting Critic at Yale University in New Haven, Connecticut. Finally, from 1963 to 1988, he was professor, and then Distinguished Professor Emeritus at Brooklyn College, in Brooklyn, New York.

== Career ==
During the 1950s Pearlstein exhibited abstract expressionist landscape paintings. Around 1958 he began to attend weekly figure drawing sessions at the studio of Mercedes Matter. In 1961 Pearlstein began to make paintings of nude couples based upon his drawings, and in 1962 he began painting directly from the model in a less painterly and more realistic style. In an article published in Arts Magazine in April 1963, Sidney Tillim wrote that "[Pearlstein] has not only regained the figure for painting; he has put it behind the plane and in deep space without recourse to nostalgia (history) or fashion (new images of man) ... He paints the nude not as a symbol of beauty and pure form but as a human fact—implicitly imperfect". He painted the female nude with painstaking realism, which was directly against trends of abstract art in the era. The human figure always remained at the center of Pearlstein's work, and he said he did not care about the psychological aspects of his models. In 1971, Pearlstein was awarded a Guggenheim Fellowship for Fine Arts.

== Collections ==
Pearlstein's work is in many museums collections in the United States, including:

- the Art Institute of Chicago,
- the Cleveland Museum of Art,
- the Corcoran Gallery of Art,
- the Hirshhorn Museum and Sculpture Garden,
- the Kemper Museum of Contemporary Art,
- the Metropolitan Museum of Art,
- the Museum of Modern Art and
- the Whitney Museum of American Art.

His personal papers are held in the Smithsonian Institution's Archives of American Art.

== Awards ==
Pearlstein received numerous awards including the National Council of Arts Administrators Visual Artist Award; The Benjamin West Clinedinst Memorial Medal, The Artists Fellowship, Inc., New York, NY; and honorary doctorate degrees from Brooklyn College, NY, Center for Creative Studies; the College of Art & Design, Detroit, MI; and the New York Academy of Arts, New York, NY.

Pearlstein was a former president of the American Academy of Arts and Letters. In 1988 he was elected into the National Academy of Design. He was represented by the Betty Cuningham Gallery.

== Personal life and death ==
The Pearlsteins had three children, of which two daughters were the subjects of several paintings he made in the 1960s, including one that was featured in New York magazine in 1968. The couple lived on the Upper West Side of Manhattan, New York City, New York. Dorothy Cantor Pearlstein died in 2018 at the age of 90.

Pearlstein died at a hospital in Manhattan on December 17, 2022, at the age of 98.
