= Colombian Mexicans =

Colombian Mexican colombo-mexicano
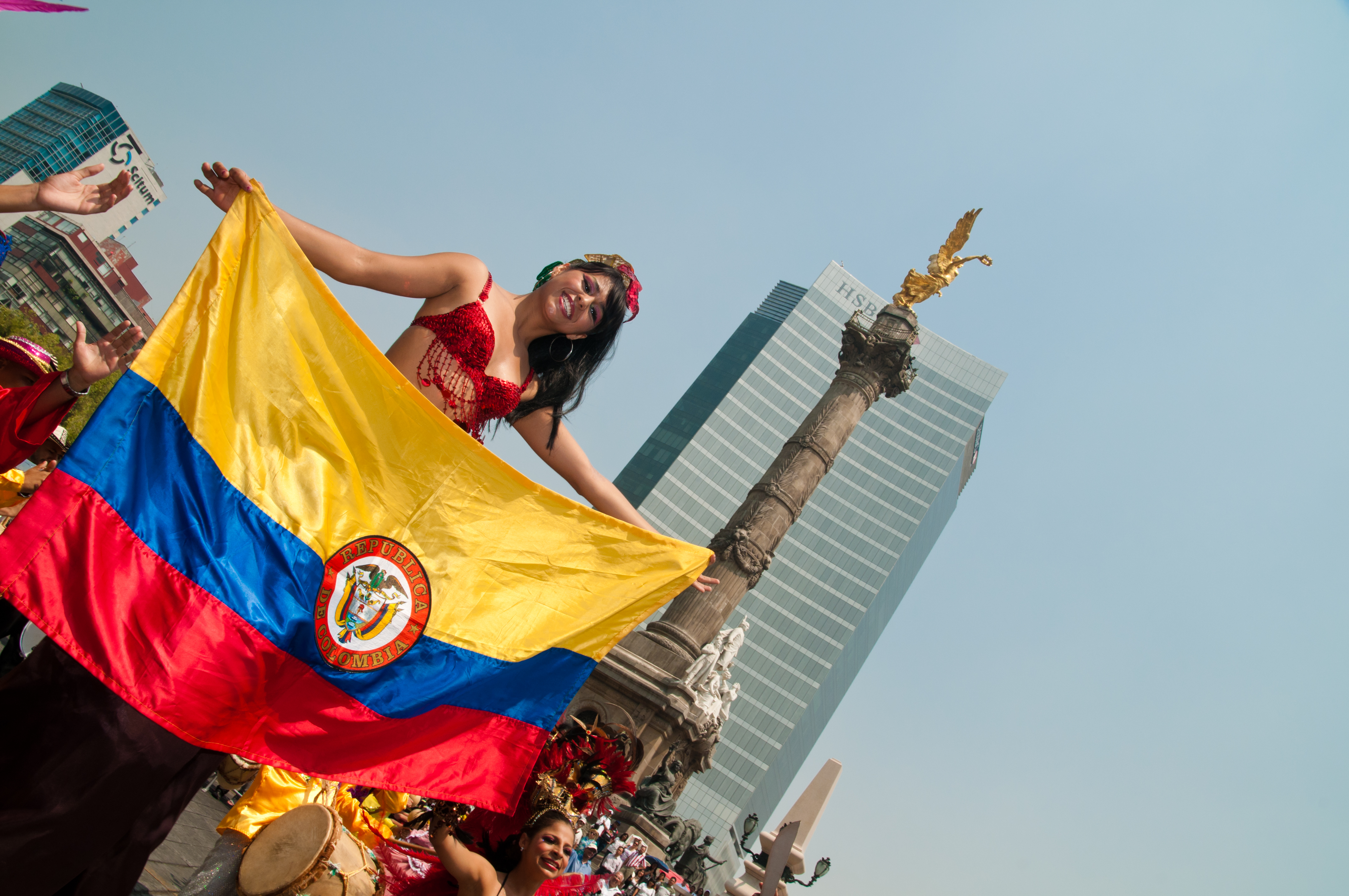
- Colombians at the Feria de las Culturas Amigas in Mexico City.

Total population
- 36,234 INEGI (2020)

Regions with significant populations
- Throughout Mexico but mainly in urban areas such as: Mexico City, Guadalajara, Monterrey, Puebla, León, Querétaro, Tijuana, Cancún, Mérida, Oaxaca, Hermosillo, Toluca

Languages
- Colombian Spanish and Mexican Spanish

Religion
- Roman Catholicism

Related ethnic groups
- Colombian diaspora

There is a significant Colombian diaspora in Mexico. According to the 2020 census, there were 36,234 Colombian citizens residing in Mexico, making them the second largest South American immigrant community in Mexico.

== Migration history ==
After Mexico's independence from Spain, the presence of Colombian people in Mexico was almost nonexistent, although over the years there was an increase of some Colombian immigrants for various reasons in Mexican territory. In the 1895 Census, sixty-seven Colombia-born individuals were counted as residents. It was not until the 1970s when the presence of Colombians increased under the protection of political asylum as refugees by the Mexican government because of the Colombian guerrilla problems fleeing from their country during the 80s and many of them were protected and kept anonymous to avoid persecution. Both countries share the Spanish language; their historical origins are common (part of the Spanish Empire).

== Notable individuals ==
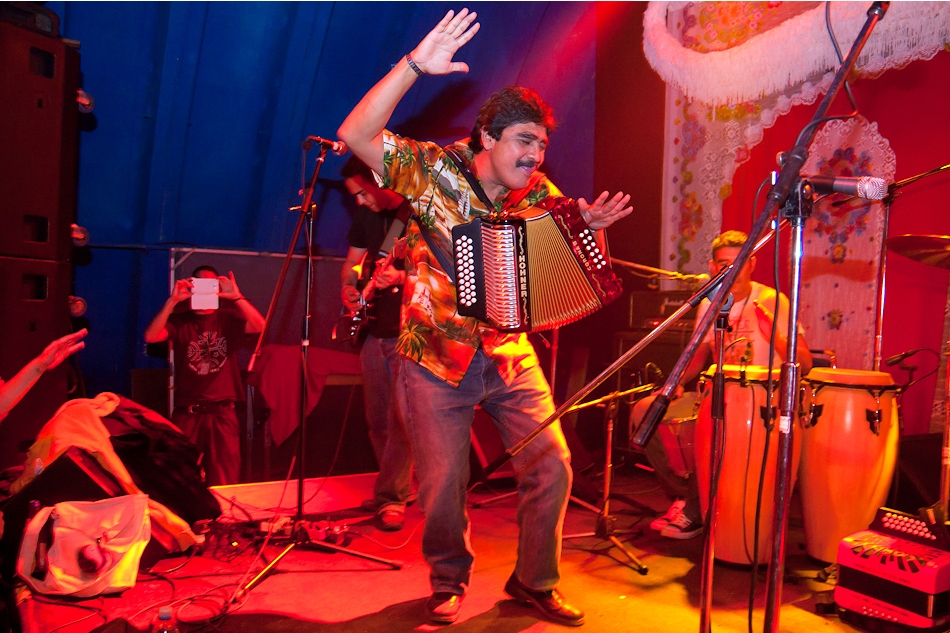
Celso Piña, a Mexican, is a Cumbia singer. The genre is a popular contribution to the culture of Mexico made by Colombians.

- Gabriel García Marquez, writer
- Álvaro Mutis, writer
- Fernando Botero Zea, politician
- Jorge Ortiz de Pinedo, actor
- Diana Golden, actress
- Harry Geithner, actor
- Aura Cristina Geithner, actress
- Miguel Calero, footballer
- Rómulo Rozo, artist
- Fernando Vallejo, writer
- Daniel Arenas, actor and model
- Sofía Álvarez, actress and singer
- Margarita la Diosa de la Cumbia, singer
- María Elisa Camargo, actress
- Juan Pablo Gamboa, actor
- Julián Quiñones, footballer

== See also ==
- Colombia–Mexico relations
- Mercado de Medellín
- Colombian diaspora
- Ethnic groups in Mexico
