= Óscar E. Duplán Maldonado =

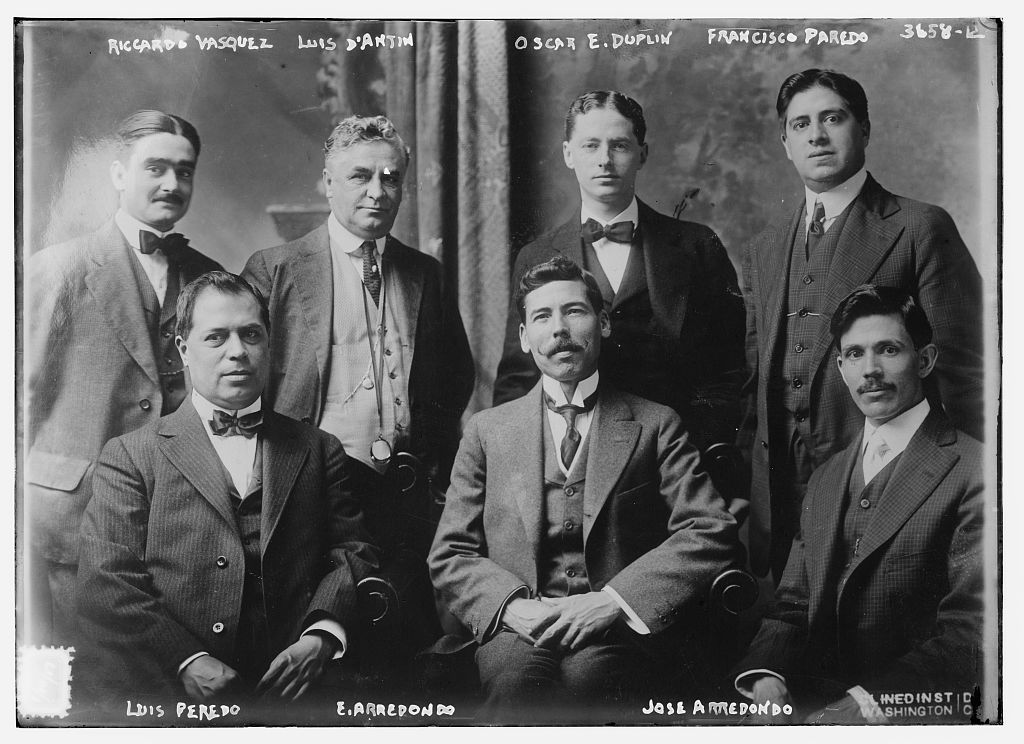
Riccardo Vasquez, Luis D'Antin (politician), Óscar E. Duplan Maldonado, Francisco Peredo, Luis Peredo and Eliseo Arredondo, and Jose Arrendondo

Óscar E. Duplan Maldonado (April 17, 1890 - April 23, 1942) was the Mexican ambassador to Colombia from 1933 to 1934.

== Biography ==
He was born on April 17, 1890, in Pichucalco, Mexico to Dr. Ernesto Duplán. He attended the Model School of Orizaba and Universidad Veracruzana and Universidad Popular Autónoma del Estado de Puebla but did not graduate. He joined the diplomatic service as a secretary at the Embassy of Mexico, Washington, D.C. under Eliseo Arredondo.

He served as Ambassador of Mexico to Colombia from 1933 to 1934

He died on April 23, 1942, in Ciudad de México.
