= Colombia–Mexico relations =

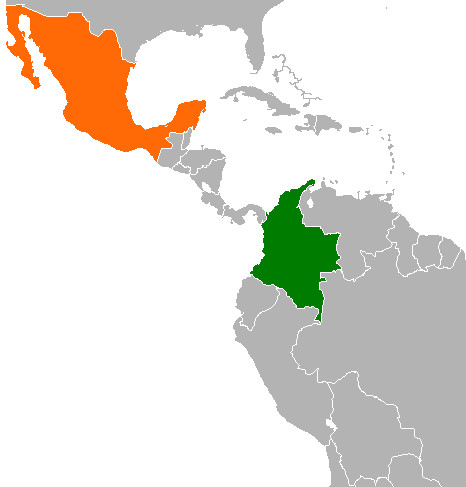

- Colombia: Mexico

The nations of Colombia and Mexico established diplomatic relations in 1821 when Colombia became the first country in Latin-America to recognize Mexico's independence. Both nations are members of the Association of Caribbean States, Community of Latin American and Caribbean States, Latin American Integration Association, Organization of American States, Organization of Ibero-American States, Pacific Alliance and the United Nations.

== History ==
Both nations are host to great indigenous cultures; the Aztecs and Mayas in Mexico and the Muiscas and Incas in Colombia. Colombia and Mexico both share a common history in that they were both colonized by Spain and each nation was the seat of power of one of four Spanish viceroyalties. Soon after gaining independence in 1821, the newly independent Mexican Empire and Gran Colombia once bordered each other in what are now the independent nations of Costa Rica and Panama. On 10 October 1821, Colombia recognized Mexico's independence when Simón Bolívar reached out with a message to the newly independent nation, therefore establishing diplomatic relations between both nations. In 1822, Emperor Agustín de Iturbide named an ambassador to the Gran Colombia and in 1826, Mexico had a vice-consulate in Cartagena de Indias. In 1831, both nations established resident embassies in their respective capitals.

Since the establishment of diplomatic relations, both nations have become increasingly close politically and bilaterally. In 1989, both nations, along with Venezuela formed a trade bloc called the Group of 3 (Grupo de los Tres) which intended to reduce trade tariffs and create a free trade bloc between the three nations within a ten-year time span that took effect in 1995. However, in 2006, former President Hugo Chávez announced that Venezuela would be leaving the bloc due to his estranged relationship with former Mexican President Vicente Fox and former Colombian President Álvaro Uribe. The trade bloc continued without Venezuela until 2007.

Over the past few years, both nations have become increasingly tangled in the war on drugs. Colombia has for many years been known as one of the biggest producers of drugs and for having notorious cartels. Mexico was traditionally a transit country for Colombia drugs to pass through en route to the United States (the largest demand market for drug consumption). However, Mexico has also become increasingly involved in drug production itself and many Mexican drug cartels have increasingly partnered with Colombian cartels in transiting drugs to other markets globally. Both the Colombian and Mexican government have increasingly worked together to combat the cartels and have hired advisers from each other nations to practice successful tactics in each other's nations respectively.

Colombia and Mexico are two of the four founding members of the Pacific Alliance (the others being Chile and Peru). From 2017 to 2018, both nations celebrated a "Dual Year" in order to promote greater rapprochement among both nations, strengthen ties through activities in the areas of culture, education and academic mobility, trade and investment, entrepreneurship and innovation, among others, which were celebrated throughout two years.

In July 2021, Colombian Vice-President and Foreign Minister Marta Lucía Ramírez, paid a visit to Mexico and met with her counterpart Marcelo Ebrard to reaffirm their commitment to strengthening both nations' joint bilateral relations mechanisms. In 2022, both nations celebrated 200 years of diplomatic relations. In November of that same year, Colombian President Gustavo Petro paid a visit to Mexico and met with Mexican President Andrés Manuel López Obrador. During the visit, Mexico was asked to and accepted the invitation to become a guarantor country in negotiations between the Colombian government and the National Liberation Army (ELN).

In September 2023, Mexican President Andrés Manuel López Obrador paid a visit to Cali, Colombia to attend a Latin-American and Caribbean Conference on drugs. While in Colombia, Presidente López Obrador met with Colombian President Gustavo Petro and the two leaders discussed the ongoing peace process in Colombia. In October 2024, President Petro travelled to Mexico to attend the inauguration of President Claudia Sheinbaum. President Petro returned to Mexico in December 2024 and met with President Sheinbaum.

== High-level visits ==
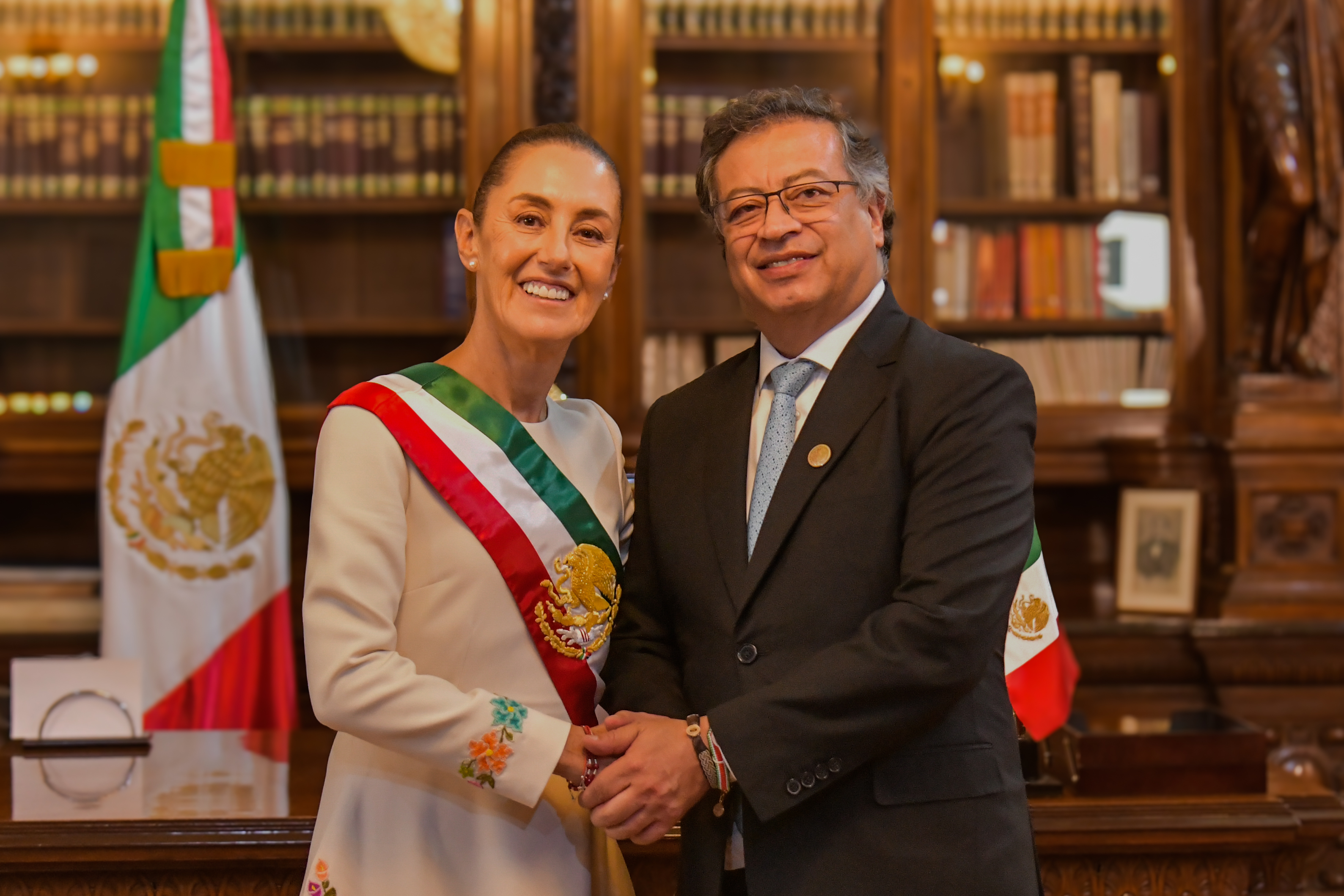
Mexican President Claudia Sheinbaum and Colombian President Gustavo Petro in Mexico City; October 2024.

Presidential visits from Colombia to Mexico

- President Julio César Turbay Ayala (1979)
- President Belisario Betancur (1983, 1985)
- President Virgilio Barco Vargas (1987)
- President César Gaviria (1990, 1991)
- President Ernesto Samper (1994)
- President Andrés Pastrana Arango (1998, 2002)
- President Álvaro Uribe (2004, 2006, 2007, April & November 2008, February 2010)
- President Juan Manuel Santos (September & November 2010, August & November 2011, 2012, February & December 2014, 2015, 2018)
- President Iván Duque Márquez (2018, 2020)
- President Gustavo Petro (2022, 2023, October and December 2024)

Presidential visits from Mexico to Colombia

- President José López Portillo (1977)
- President Miguel de la Madrid Hurtado (1984)
- President Carlos Salinas de Gortari (1989, 1991)
- President Ernesto Zedillo (2000)
- President Vicente Fox (2001)
- President Felipe Calderón (2008, May & August 2009, August & October 2010, 2012)
- President Enrique Peña Nieto (2013, 2014, September and October 2016, 2017, 2018)
- President Andrés Manuel López Obrador (2023)

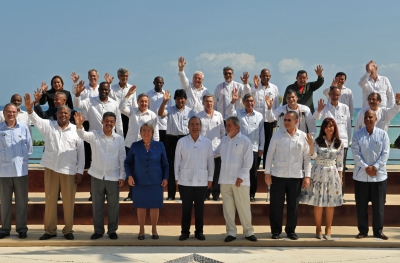
President Felipe Calderón and President Álvaro Uribe in Cancún; 2010.

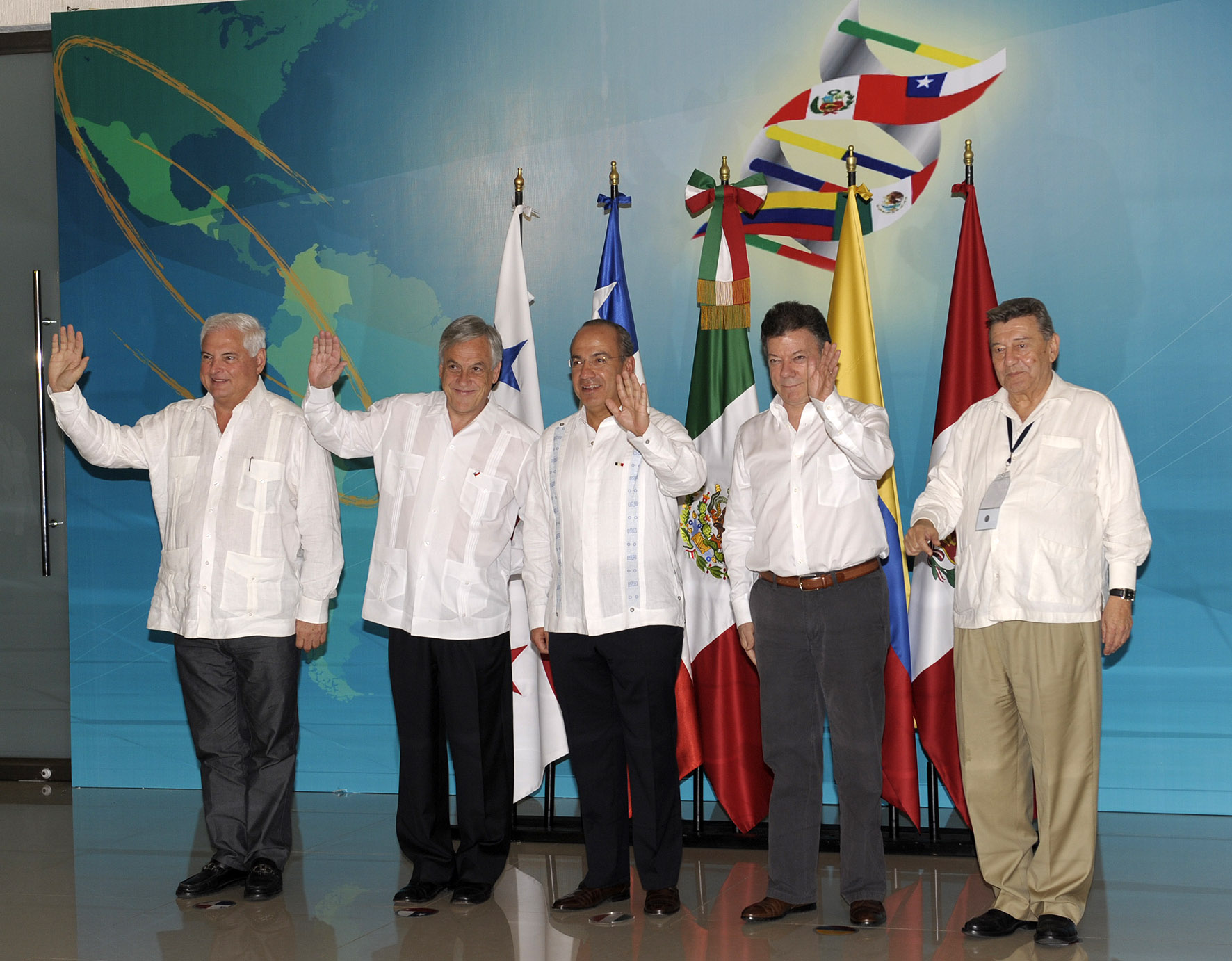
President Felipe Calderón and President Juan Manuel Santos in Mérida, Mexico; 2011.

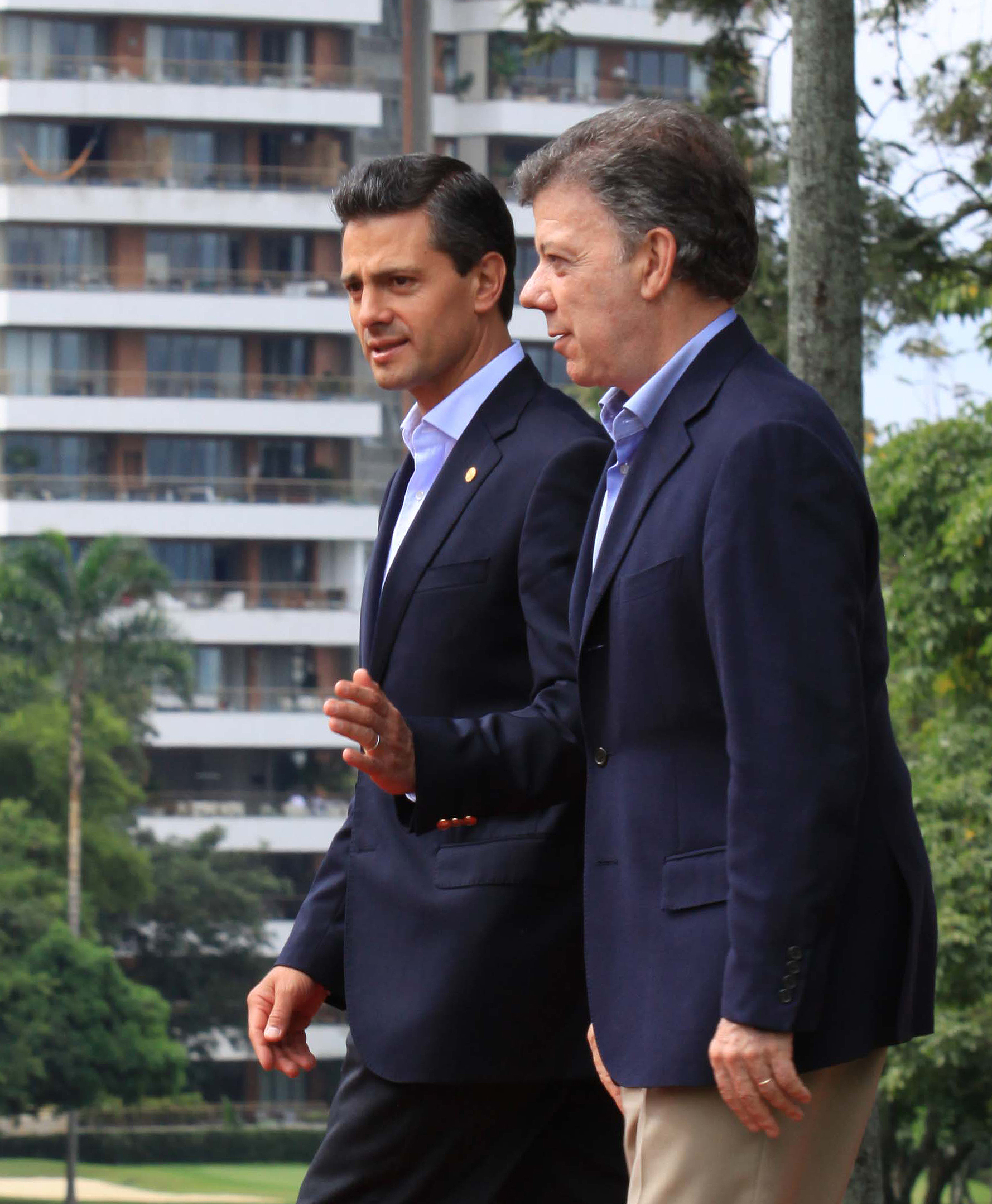
President Enrique Peña Nieto and President Juan Manuel Santos in Cali, Colombia; 2013.

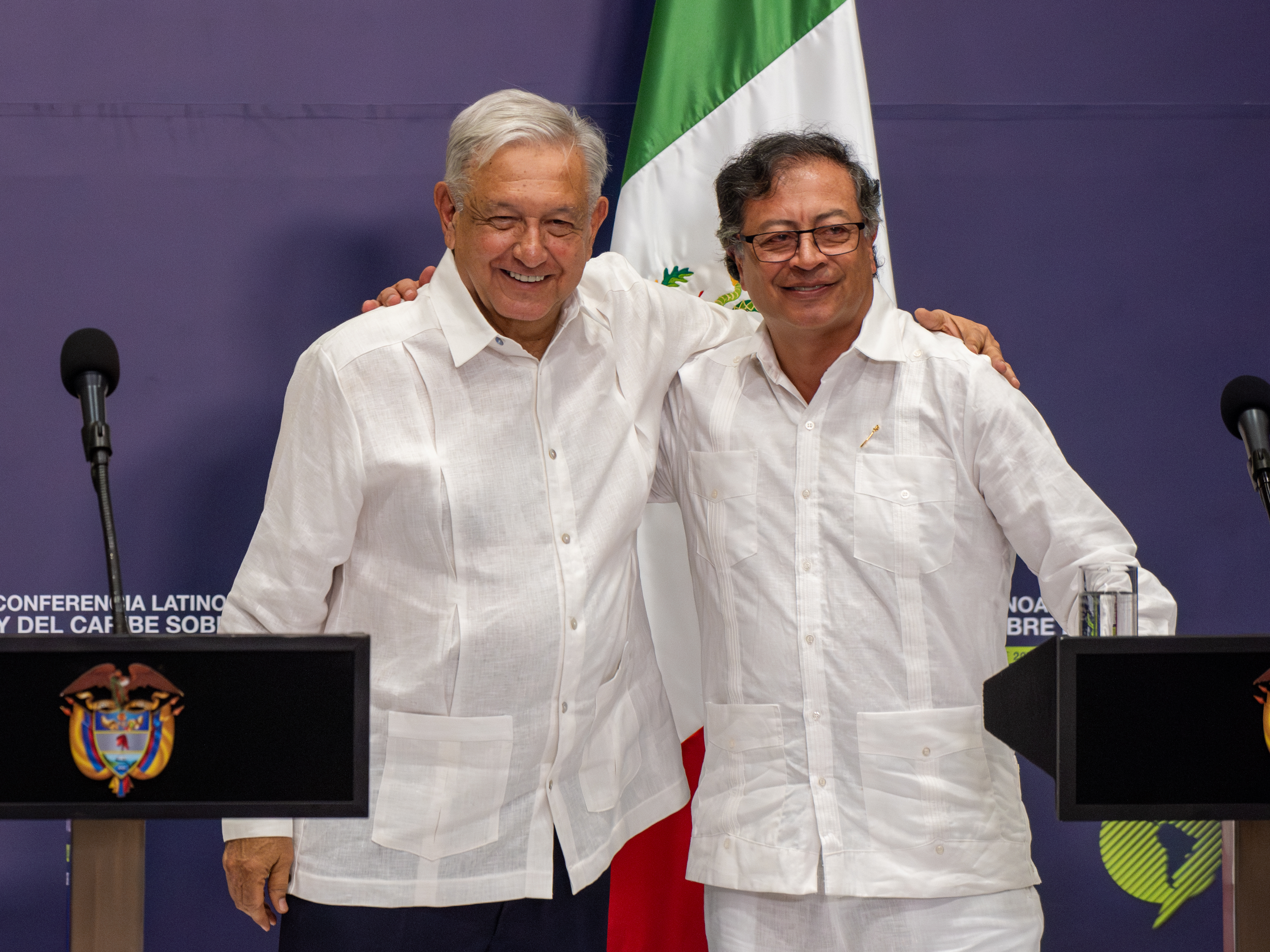
President Andrés Manuel López Obrador and President Gustavo Petro in Cali, Colombia; September 2023.

== Bilateral agreements ==
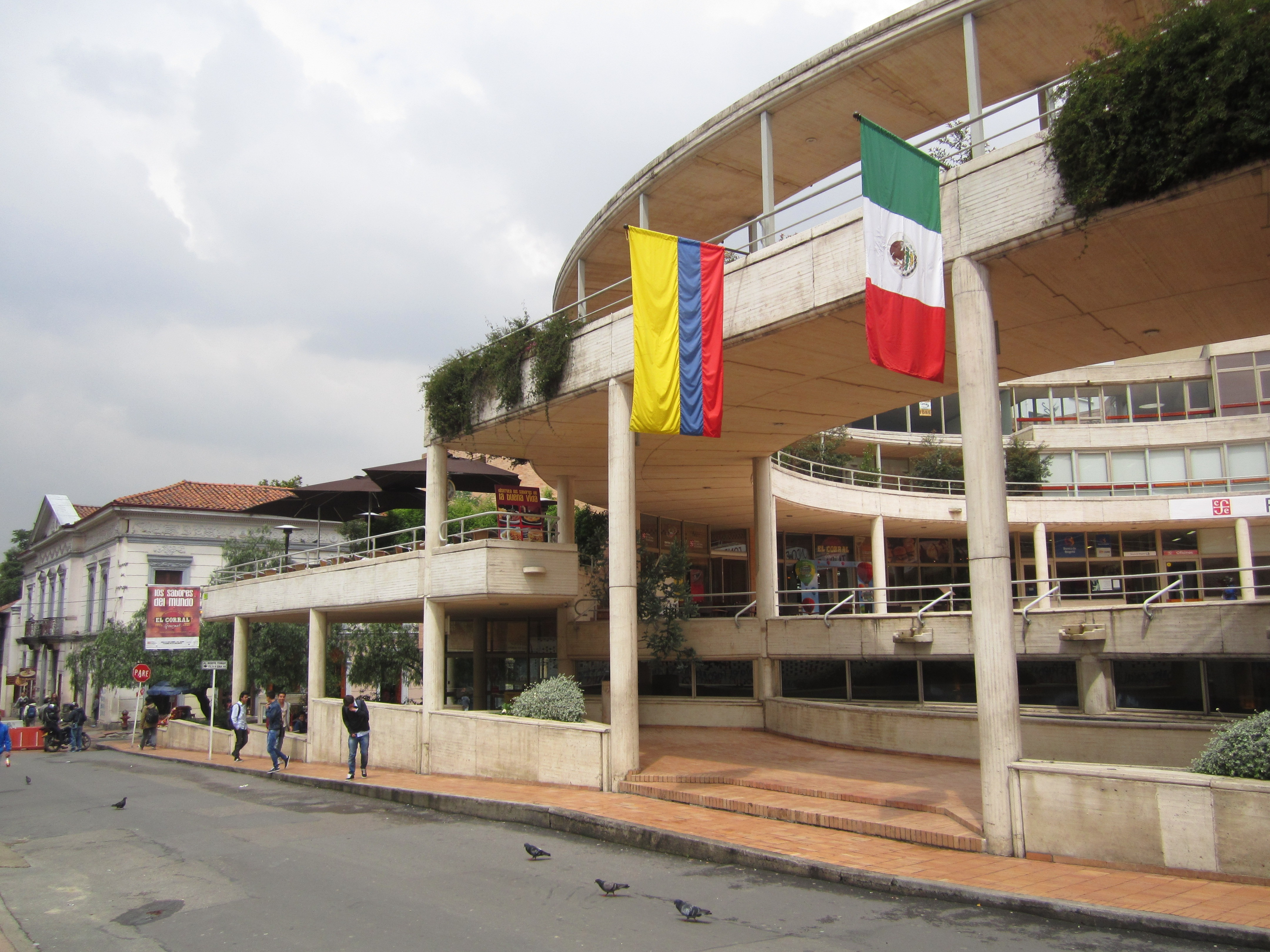
Gabriel García Márquez Cultural Center in Bogotá

Both nations have signed several bilateral agreements such as an Arbitration Treaty (1928); Air Transportation Agreement (1975); Agreement in Scientific and Technical Cooperation (1979); Agreement for Cultural and Educational Exchanges (1979); Free Trade Agreement (1994); Agreement of Cooperation in the Fight against Illicit Trafficking Narcotic Drugs and Psychotropic Substances (1997); Tourist Cooperation Agreement (1998); Agreement for the Exchange of Non-Judicialized Information (1998); Agreement for Mutual Recognition of Certificates of Studies, Titles and Academic Degrees of Higher Education (1998); Agreement of Cooperation on Legal Matters (1998); Agreement to Avoid Double Taxation and to Prevent Tax Evasion in Relation to Taxes on Income and on Equity (2009); Extradition Treaty (2011) and an Agreement to Prohibit and Prevent Theft and/or Theft, Introduction, Extraction and Illicit Trafficking of Cultural Property (2015).

== Transportation and Tourism ==
In 2025, over 500,000 Colombian citizens visited Mexico for tourism, making them the third largest group of visitors to Mexico (after the United States and Canada). That same year, more than 300,000 Mexican citizens visited Colombia for tourism.

There are direct flights between Colombia and Mexico with the following airlines: Aeroméxico, Avianca, Viva Aerobus, Volaris and Wingo.

== Trade relations ==
Trade between the two nations has increased dramatically over the past ten years. In 2023, trade between the two nations totaled US$5.6 billion. Colombia's main exports to Mexico include: coal, crude oil, instant coffee and automobile parts. Mexico's main exports to Colombia include: flat screen TVs, pure petroleum oil for tank-car, ship-tank or auto-tanks; corrugated rods or bars for reinforcement, for cement or concrete; shampoos; milk powder or pills; tequila and malt beer.

Colombia is Mexico's tenth largest trading partner globally. Colombian multinational companies such as Grupo Nutresa, Rappi and Terpel (among others) operate in Mexico. Mexican multinational companies such as Alsea, América Móvil, Grupo Bimbo, Cemex, Mabey, Orbia and Oxxo (among others) operate in Colombia.

== Resident diplomatic missions ==
of Colombia in Mexico

- Mexico City (Embassy)
- Mexico City (Consulate-General)
- Cancún (Consulate-General)
- Guadalajara (Consulate)

of Mexico in Colombia

- Bogotá (Embassy)

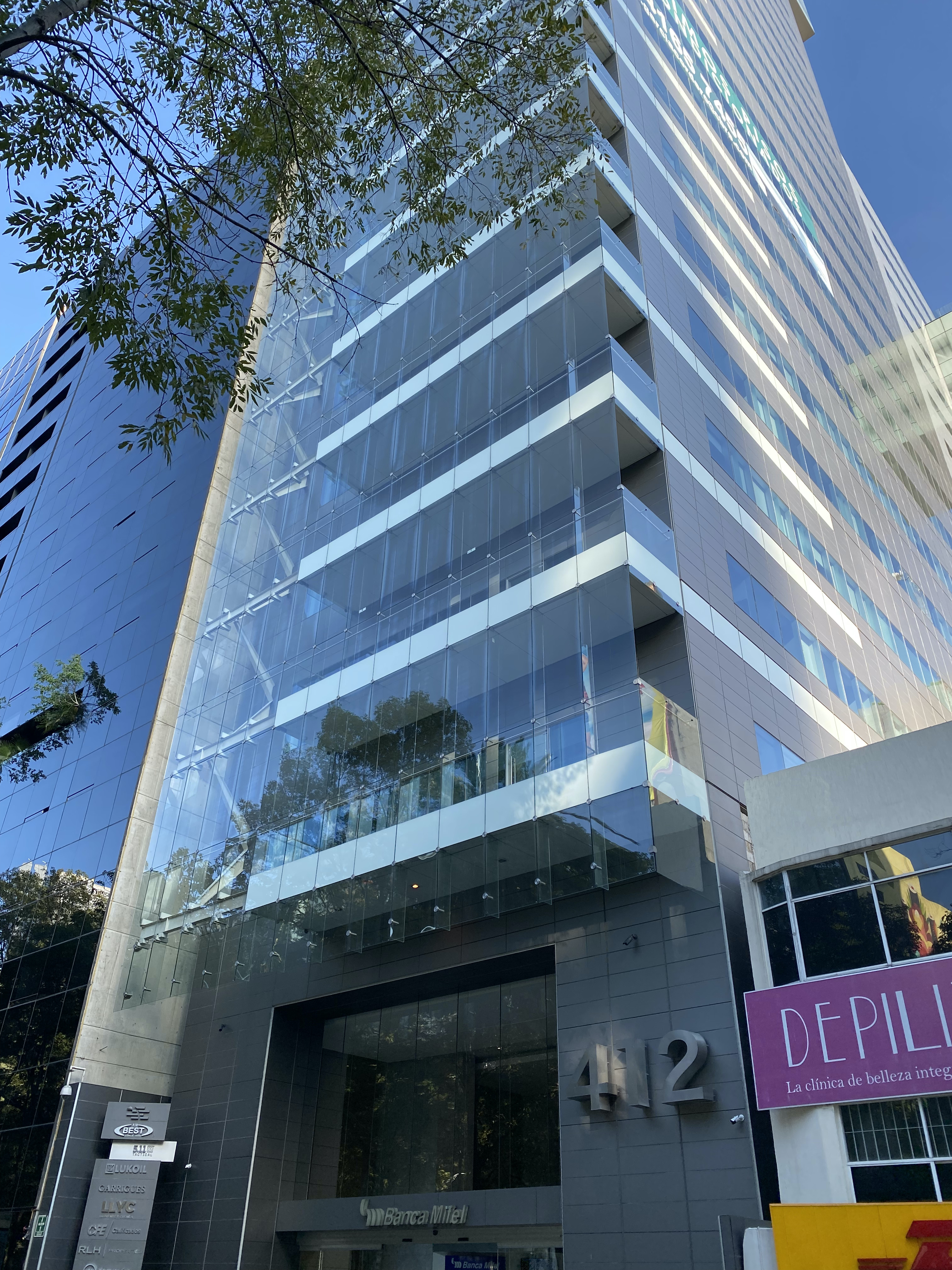
Embassy of Colombia in Mexico City

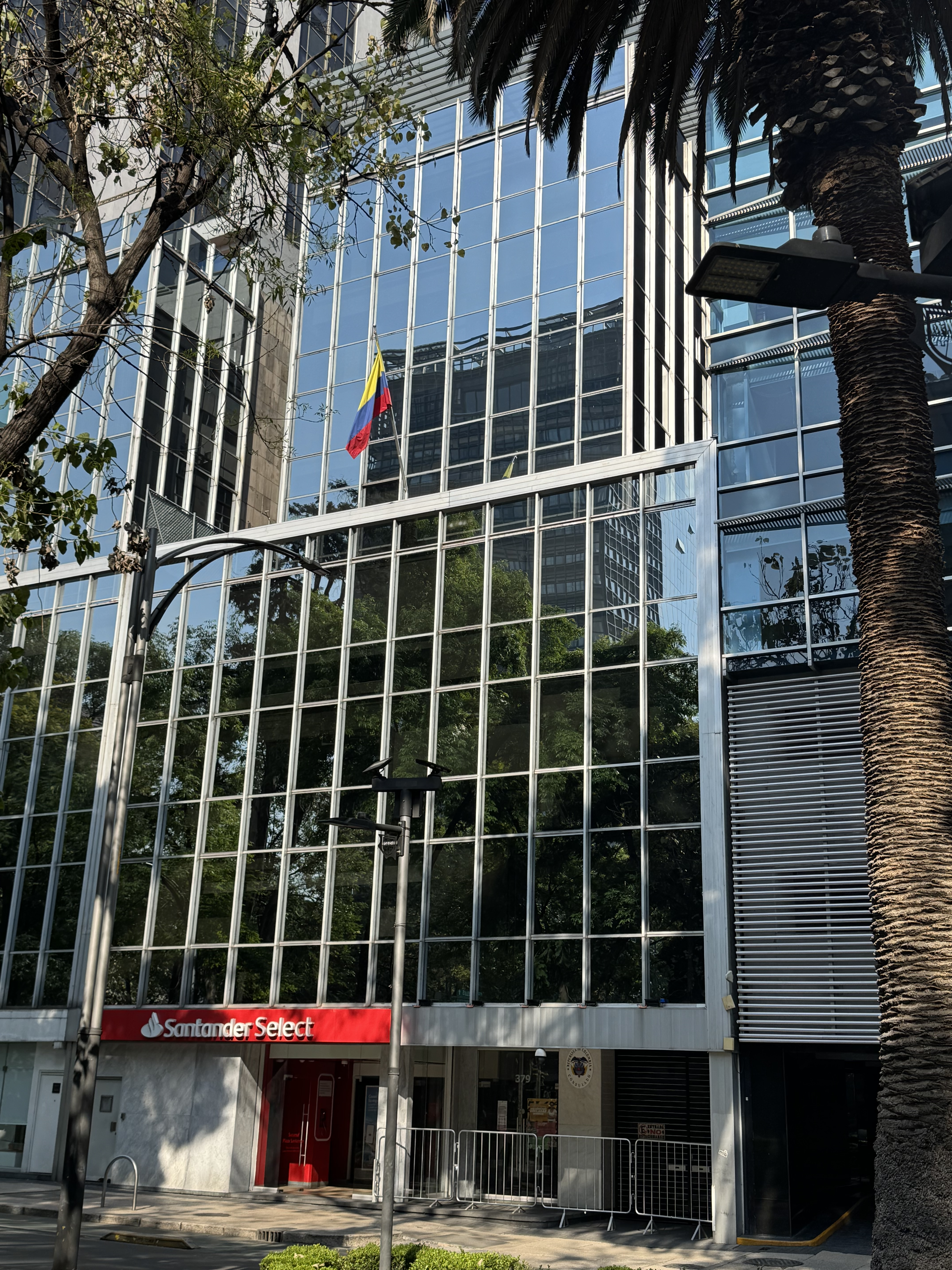
Consulate-General of Colombia in Mexico City

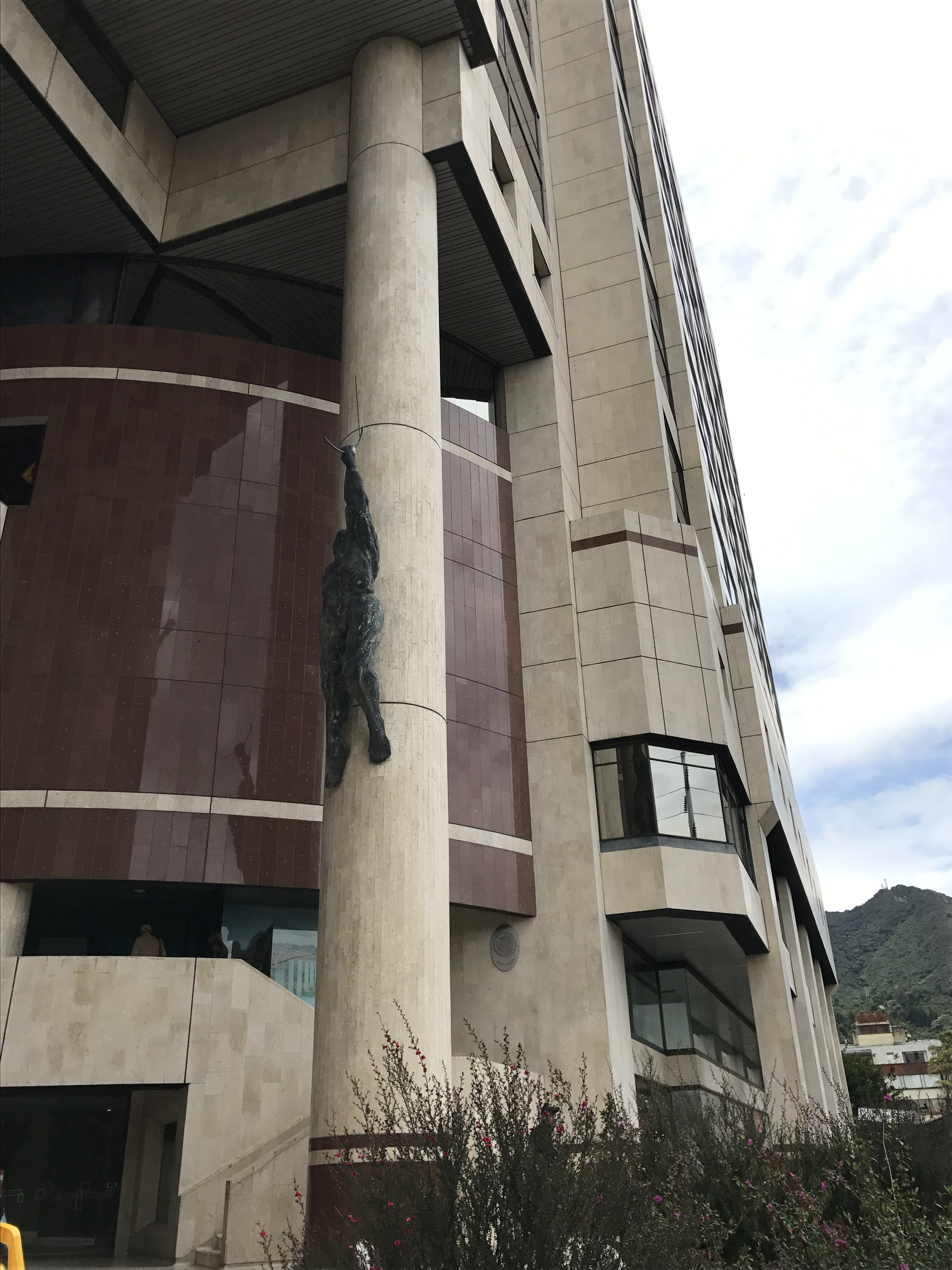
Embassy of Mexico in Bogotá

== Gallery ==
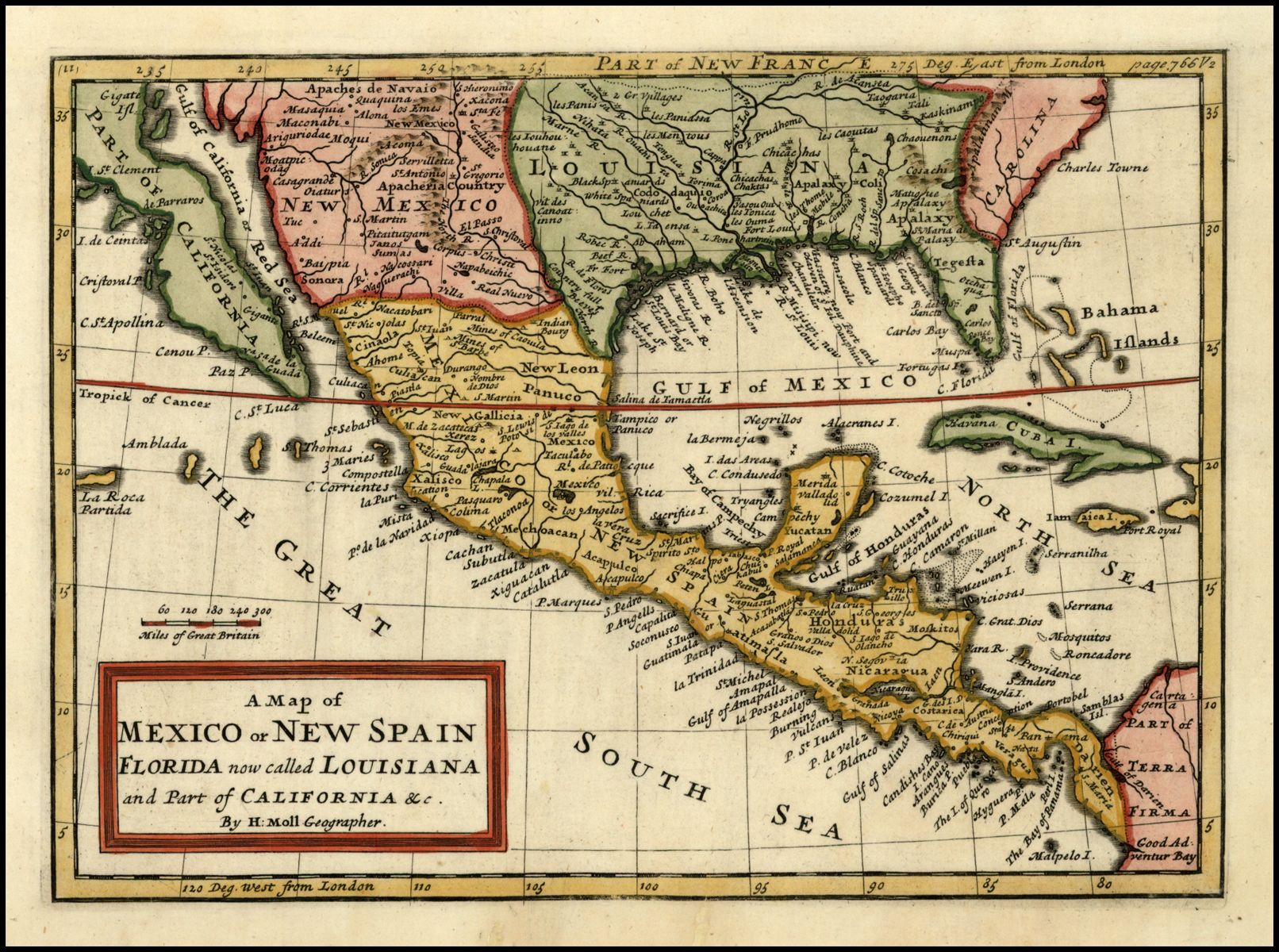
Historic map showing New Spain (in present day Mexico) and the Gran Colombia bordering each other

Mexican warship ARM Mina and Colombian warship ARC Almirante Padilla partaking in the UNITAS Gold

Honorary consulate of Mexico in Medellín

Sculpture by Colombian artist Fernando Botero in Monterrey

== See also ==
- Colombian Mexicans
