= Robert Kipniss =

American painter and printmaker (born 1931)

- Born: February 1, 1931 (age 95); Brooklyn, NY
- Education: Attended Wittenberg College (now Wittenberg University), Springfield, Ohio (1948–49); and University of Iowa, Iowa City, (B.A., 1952, English literature; Master of Fine Arts, 1954)
- Known for: Contemporary art: representational paintings, lithographs, mezzotints, and drypoints
- Spouses: Laurie Lisle (1994–present); Jean Prutton (1954–1982)
- Website: www.robertkipnissstudio.com

Robert Kipniss (born Brooklyn, New York, February 1, 1931) is an American painter and printmaker. His mature paintings, lithographs, mezzotints, and drypoints share stylistic characteristics and subject matter and typically depict trees seen close up or at varying distances in fields. Other works show one or more houses in a landscape or town setting. Some are interiors with a view toward a window or with a still life set close to one, frequently with a landscape beyond. No human figures are present, and all forms are reduced to essentials. The time is often dusk or nighttime. Kipniss' use of exceptionally subtle black and white tones or, less often, lightly toned hues creates an overall atmospheric effect. His works have been described as conveying solitude and inward experience. Kipniss often uses the subject matter of a painting in a lithograph or mezzotint, sometimes with variations. His paintings date from the early 1950s. His main body of prints are lithographs and mezzotints, the former dating from 1968 into 1994, the latter since 1990.

From 1998-2024, Kipniss maintained studios on the Hudson River in Westchester County, New York and at his home in northwestern Connecticut. He married his second wife, Laurie Lisle, a writer, in 1994. He has four children from his first marriage, in 1954, to Jean Prutton. They were divorced in 1982.

== Early life and education ==
Robert Kipniss was born in 1931 in Brooklyn, New York, to Simeon and Stella Kipniss, both of whom worked in Manhattan, New York. His father, a Sunday painter, was employed for thirty-five years by Sears, Roebuck and Company as a layout director designing catalogue pages. Kipniss's mother, née Schwartz, drew fashion illustrations for many years for newspaper advertisements run by Gimbel's and other department stores. Kipniss's only sibling, a sister, was born in 1936. The family moved to Laurelton, Queens, that year and to Forest Hills, Queens, New York, in 1941. At age sixteen, Kipniss attended New York's Arts Students League on Saturdays. He began college in 1948, attending Wittenberg College in Springfield, Ohio, for two years before transferring to the University of Iowa, Iowa City, in 1950. He began writing poetry in 1948. After graduating with a B.A. degree in English literature in 1952, Kipniss stayed at the university and earned a Master of Fine Arts degree in 1954. By then he regarded himself primarily as a painter although he continued to write poetry.

In 1951 Kipniss was awarded a one-man show at the Creative Gallery, on 57th Street in Manhattan, as the result of a painting competition and showed semi-abstractions "suggesting romantic images of ethereal landscapes and half-grasped moments." In 1953 the Harry Salpeter Gallery, also on 57th Street, gave him his second one-man show.

In 1954 Kipniss and his wife, Jean, moved to Manhattan, and he continued to paint. He was drafted into the U.S. Army in 1956 and assigned to the Instructional Aids Division of the Quartermaster Corps at Fort Lee, Virginia, where his drawing skills were put to use in making training aids. Discharged in 1958, Kipniss returned with his wife to Manhattan. That year he received representation at the Contemporaries, a Manhattan gallery, and showed there in 1959 and 1960. He continued what had become a routine, painting by day and working at the Manhattan General Post Office during the evenings; by 1964, he was able to earn his living creating paintings.

Since 1965 Kipniss has had more than twenty-two museum and other institutional one-man exhibitions across the United States and abroad. His first institutional one-man exhibition was in 1965 at the Allen R. Hite Institute of the University of Louisville in Kentucky. The most recent of his several retrospectives, a five-decade print retrospective comprising eighty-six lithographs, mezzotints, and drypoints from the James F. White Collection, was shown at the New Orleans Museum of Art, New Orleans, Louisiana, in 2006 at the time of a celebratory reopening of the museum six months after the devastation of Hurricane Katrina. In 1980 a large solo show of paintings and prints took place at La Tertulia Museum in Cali, Colombia.

Kipniss's work is held by more than eighty-eight museums and other institutions. In 1982, John Caldwell of the New York Times noted that Kipniss "is represented in many of the most important museums in this country, and his record of one-man shows, which began in 1959 [sic, 1951] has of late turned into a veritable torrent of exhibitions." In the United States, he has shown his work and been represented at: Weinstein Gallery, San Francisco (1999–2014); Gerhard Wurzer Gallery, Houston, Texas (1981–2004); and Harmon-Meek Gallery, Naples, Florida (1976 through the present). In Manhattan, his work has appeared at and he has been represented by the Old Print Shop (1980s through the present); Beadleston Gallery (2000–2003); Hirschl & Adler Galleries (1976–81); FAR Gallery (1964–74); and the Contemporaries (1959–63). In London, he has shown at and been represented by the Redfern Gallery (1996 to the present).

== Influences ==
In his 1982 New York Times review, cited above, Caldwell also observed that "the question of artistic influences is unusually complicated in the case of Mr. Kipniss" and that "the sense that one gets in all of [his] work is of a genuinely individual sensibility." Several writers on art have mentioned the work of Romantic landscape painter Caspar David Friedrich, Hudson River School painters such as George Inness, and the Barbizon School painters, including Camille Corot, as having qualities similar to Kipniss's or as possible sources of inspiration for him.

Kipniss himself has indicated various locations as important sources of inspiration, especially on his scenes with houses. The locations include the streets and neighborhoods of Springfield, Ohio, which he sometimes sketched during his first two college years and revisited in 1979, taking photographs and sketching alleys and streets at twilight. He returned over the next twenty years to continue sketching. In 1999 Kipniss described how this location influenced his artistic development: "‘The elements that remain a large part of my imagery all my working life began to emerge in these sketches: mysterious windowless houses, backyard fences, trees leafless in the off-season. . . . My work remains unpopulated because I can then become as if the lone inhabitant, and when the work leaves my hands, who stands before it becomes for a moment me, alone, there.’"

Other locations that inspired Kipniss were alleys in Columbus, Ohio, which he sketched in 1958. In 1989 he briefly visited Elsah, Illinois, a small town on the Mississippi River (since 1974 on the National Register of Historic Places) where the narrow streets and many limestone houses made an impression on him. He returned the next year to do sketches that became the basis of works in other mediums. In 1993 the woods and fields of northwestern Connecticut provided inspiration for paintings and mezzotints.

== Works ==
=== Paintings ===
Large Trees at Dusk (1962), oil on canvas, 36" x 40", Carnegie Museum of Art, Pittsburgh, Pennsylvania

Kipniss's early work consisted of abstractions, biomorphic forms, landscapes, cityscapes, still lifes, and figures. The majority of these works were landscapes of subdued color, often with few details, and loosely brushed. Large Trees at Dusk (1962) was one of several paintings and drawings in 1961 and 1962 which introduced a boldness of form and a more pronounced moodiness.

The paintings and prints that followed, executed either in black and white or in color, include numerous variations in the shape, size, and placement of trees. Large Trees at Dusk exhibits the beginning of Kipniss's purification of tree forms, his use of closely related hues in a subdued or dark range, and the sense of solitude characteristic of his mature output. Of the paintings and prints since 1962, hundreds show the interplay of tree trunks, focusing on close or more distance views.

In the review of a solo painting show in Manhattan in 1966, a Time magazine critic wrote: "In the twilight zone between recollection and imagination, a New York painter has found a vista of mind and mood that he calls ‘the Inner Landscape.’ With hushed tones, feathered brushing and eerie chiaroscuro, he invests his scenes with the appearance of reality and the ambiance of dream."

Splash III (2003) is an example of Kipniss's paintings of trees extending into grassy landscapes. Many paintings of this type, which occasionally have one or more generic houses, display his use of closely related tones, a strong accent on the purity of form, refined silhouetting, and pronounced luminosity. Kipniss composes his forms and spaces separately, working on each alternately after the paint has dried. He brushes between them and recomposes each area more than once, sometimes with five or six passes in order to get "the varied parts of the image to mesh together."

=== Lithographs ===
From 1968 to 1994, Kipniss created lithographs that followed the style and content of his paintings, whether generally or specifically. A commission from a print publisher in 1968 for five editions of lithographs precipitated his adoption of lithography as a medium.

Kipniss's first lithographs were done in black and white, but by 1970 he was also working in color. He taught himself "to lay in the most delicately light silvery tones on the surface of the limestone by maintaining an exceptionally sharp point on the lithographic pencil and drawing with no pressure other than the weight of the pencil itself." He built up a support so that his hand and wrist could "dangle" over the stone. By 1994 Kipniss had completed about 450 editions of lithographs, usually of 90 to 250 impressions, at the Burr Miller studio in Manhattan. He worked from 1969 with master printer Burr Miller and then with Steve and Terry, his sons.

In 1980 Kipniss began to draw on aluminum to make all of his lithographs, and by 1986 he was achieving an increased subtlety in the use of color with a light palette including "greens, blues, pinks, browns, and grays," as a critic noted that year. He added: "Kipniss enhances the remarkable purity and elegance of line in these lithographs by his restrained use of color. The delicate hues of his prints are of such extraordinary subtlety that it is only on careful examination that the viewer can recognize how complex they are, requiring as many as eight different plates to produce a single print." In 1994 Kipniss's concern with densely drawn fine tones led to increased difficulties in printing, and he gave up the medium.

Kipniss used six plates, with black, red, yellow, blue, green, or orange, for successive applications of color in the lithograph Through Bedroom Curtains (1983), a scene also depicted in a 1981 painting. He had begun painting interiors in his early work of the 1950s, and they appear about equally in his mature paintings and lithographs, and less so in his mezzotints.

As in Through Bedroom Curtains, he usually included a window with a view of one or more trees and one or more generalized houses and frequently also depicted one or two house plants in the interior.

=== Mezzotints ===
Tall Trees at Night (2001), mezzotint, ed. of 60; artist's proofs 10, 19 5/8" x 13 1/2"

Kipniss created a handful of mezzotints from 1982-84 but did not focus on this medium itently until 1990. He had his first solo mezzotint show in New York in 1992. He also showed mezzotints in 1995 at his first solo print show in England, and that year they comprised his first show of prints in Germany. Tall Trees at Night (2001) is in five museum collections, including the Whitney Museum of American Art, New York City, and the British Museum and the Victoria and Albert Museum, both in London.

When a copper plate is roughened in preparation for working on it, thousands of tiny holes are produced on the surface of the plate to hold the ink. Kipniss's preference has been for mechanically roughened plates because of their greater uniformity. Unlike many makers of mezzotints, he prefers using a burnisher rather than a scraper for reducing the depth of the holes, a process that controls the amount of ink held on the plate. The burnisher allows him freer motion and a greater range of pressure, as a pencil would, giving him the ability to create an image that looks drawn rather than machine crafted. Over time, Kipniss sought "narrower ranges of middle tones" while still bringing out the richness and resonance of darks characteristic of mezzotints. He has worked with master printer Anthony Kirk from 2003 to the present, first when Kirk was associated with the Connecticut Center for Printmaking in Norwalk, Connecticut, and then at Kirk's own studio in North Salem, New York.

Tall Trees at Night is one of Kipniss's many mezzotints that view trees fairly close up at dusk or night and show a play of light upon them. The characteristics that became increasingly prominent in his mature work, his concern with capturing the essence of form and with even more subtle light effects, are clearly apparent. The trees in Kipniss's mezzotints have an especially strong purity of form when only their trunks are depicted. Sometimes leaves are spread across the trees, adding more movement and increasing the technical challenge.

Window w/vase & forest (2000) is representative of still lifes that show a vase of plant cuttings, most often of stems with leaves. The vase is generally viewed close up before a window on a surface that may or may not be visible. Occasionally the bottom part of the sash is showing, and usually trees are beyond. Here, part of the view into the distance is through three layers of glass, and the form to the left is part of a chest of drawers. A painting done in reverse predates this print, and in both Kipniss extemporized the pale, delicate scrim of trees. The print is in four major museum collections, among them the Metropolitan Museum of Art, New York City, and the Fine Arts Museums of San Francisco, California Palace of the Legion of Honor.

=== Drypoints ===
Kipniss's first print and only etching was made in 1967. That year he began producing drypoints, which he has made periodically since, although in smaller numbers than his works in other mediums. "Almost all of his drypoints have the large areas of white typical of that medium, creating much more of an effect of outdoor light than his mezzotints." Springfield, O. shows the typical velvety black lines of the drypoint, caused when ink adheres to the raised burr next to the furrow, but Kipniss's lines are placed more tightly than is usual in drypoints. The work is in three institutional collections, including the British Museum, London.

== Writings and illustrations ==
=== Author ===
Thirty-eight of Kipniss's poems were featured in Robert Kipniss Paintings and Poetry 1950–1964 (2013). The book compares the mood and content of his poetry with his transitional and early mature paintings and prints.

Kipniss's memoir, Robert Kipniss: A Working Artist's Life (University Press of New England, 2011, 259 pages), describes his artistic techniques and aspects of his career and personal life.

=== Illustrator ===
Kipniss has illustrated two volumes of poetry. For Poems of Rainer Marie Rilke (1981), he created ten black and white lithographs which were reproduced in an edition of two thousand books. Ten originals in color editions of 150 that were placed in portfolio boxes as individual sheets opposite each of ten poems were published separately. Comparing the lithographs with the poems, American poet Robin Magowan has written: "Both Kipniss and Rilke are exponents of inwardness, creating meditative enigmas to which we can keep returning without piercing their mysteries. The works share a silence that carries something of an ascetic, a purging of excess and an attendant appreciation of a restraint that goes far beyond mere poetic concision. Giving in to the spell cast by this highly wrought silence, we find ourselves waking to realities normally hidden—even to what might be called the unknown, the abiding mystery of existence."

Kipniss also illustrated Poems by Emily Dickinson (1964) with twenty-six drawings. A New York Times book review called them "superb."
