= Barnett McFee Clinedinst =

American photographer (1862–1953)

Barnett McFee Clinedinst (September 12, 1862 – March 15, 1953) was the official White House photographer. Clinedinst was born in Woodstock, Virginia, to Barnett M. Clinedinst and Mary C. South.

In his youth he operated a circus and worked as a salesman. He then learned photography from his father. By 1900 he opened a photographic studio in Washington, DC. He became the White House photographer for President McKinley, Theodore Roosevelt, and President Taft.

He died on March 15, 1953, in Saint Petersburg, Florida.

== Photographs ==
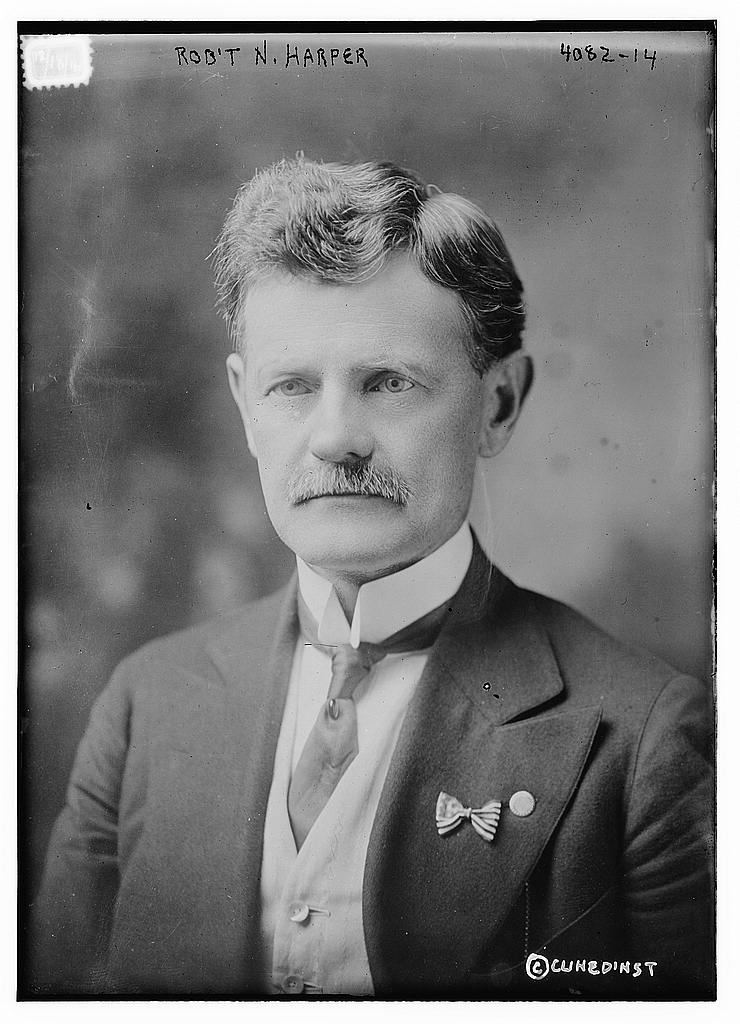
Colonel Robert Newton Harper

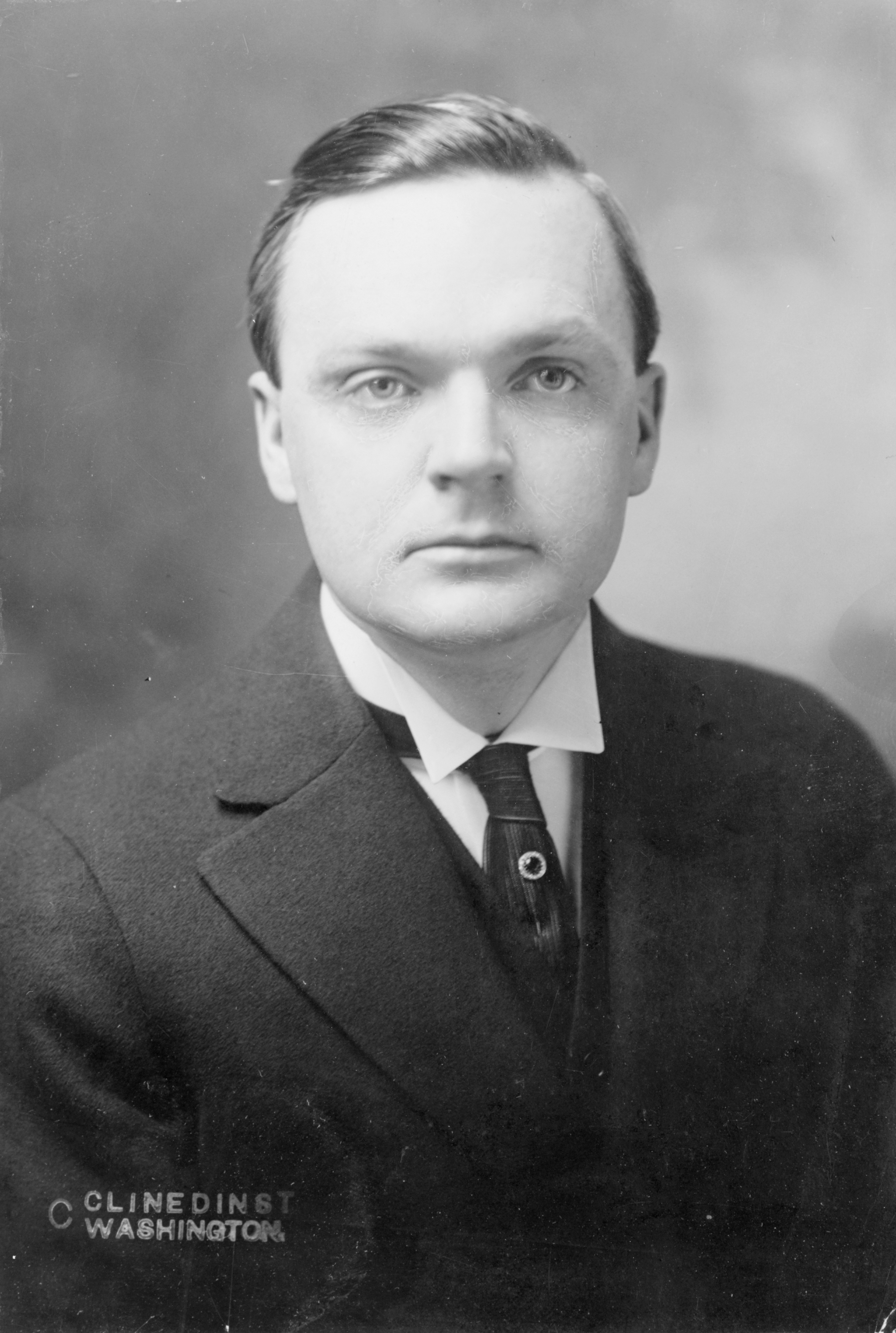
Dudley Field Malone

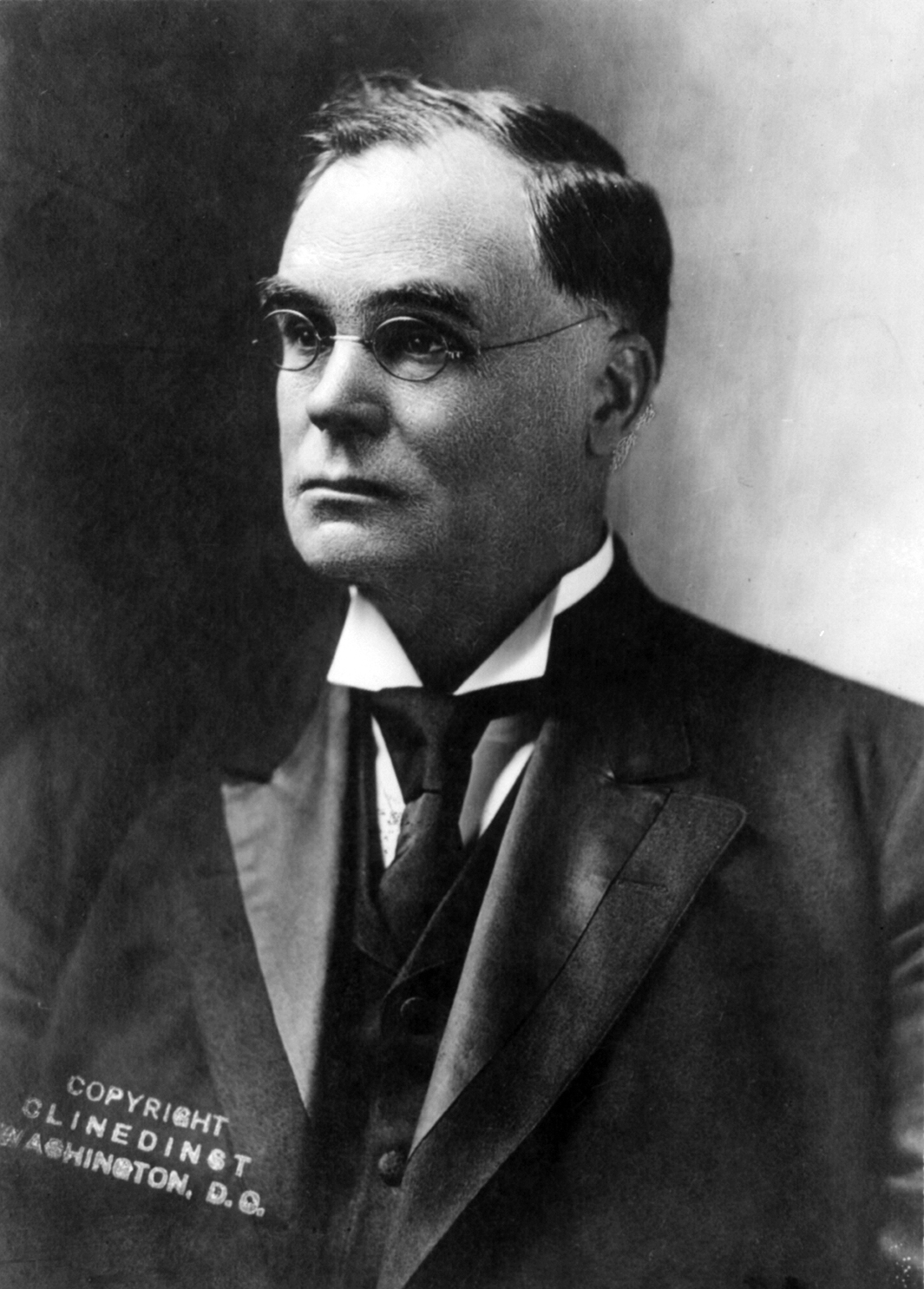
Magnus Johnson

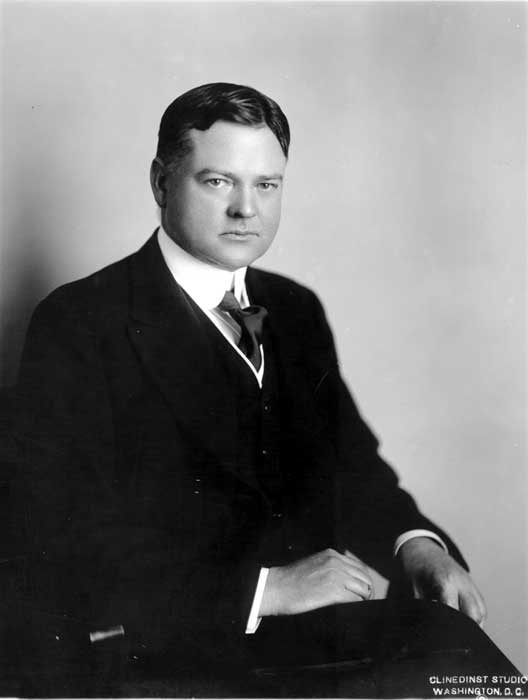
Herbert Hoover

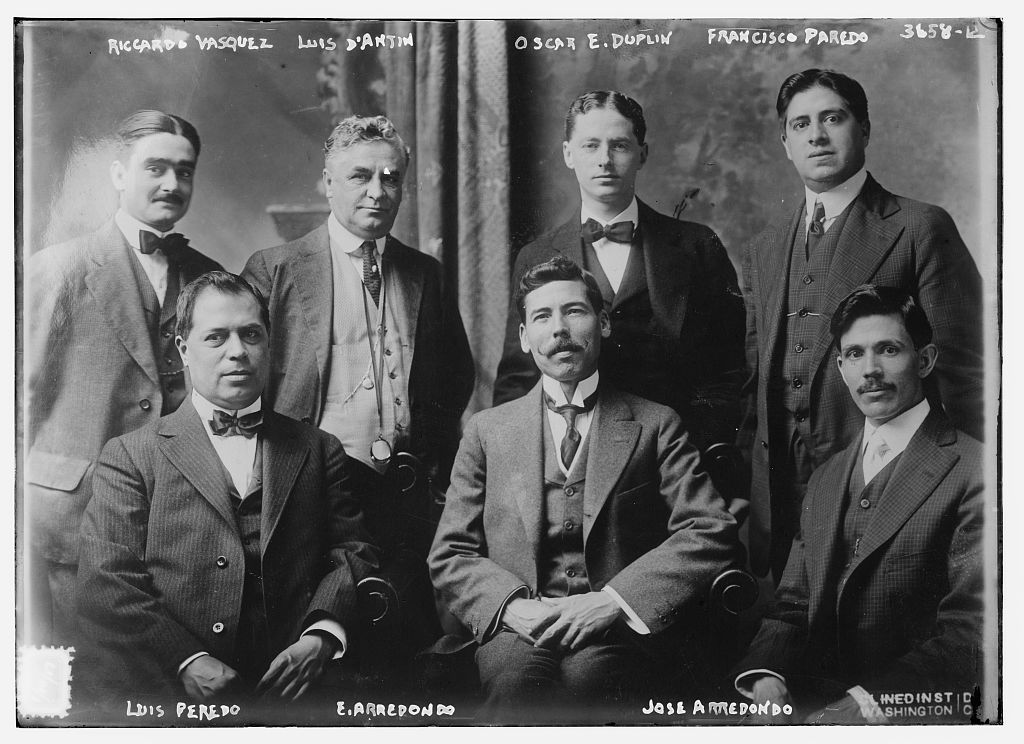
Riccardo Vasquez, Luis D'Antin, Óscar E. Duplán Maldonado, Francisco Peredo, Luis Peredo and Arrendondo, and Jose Arrendondo
