= Barnett M. Clinedinst =

American photographer and inventor

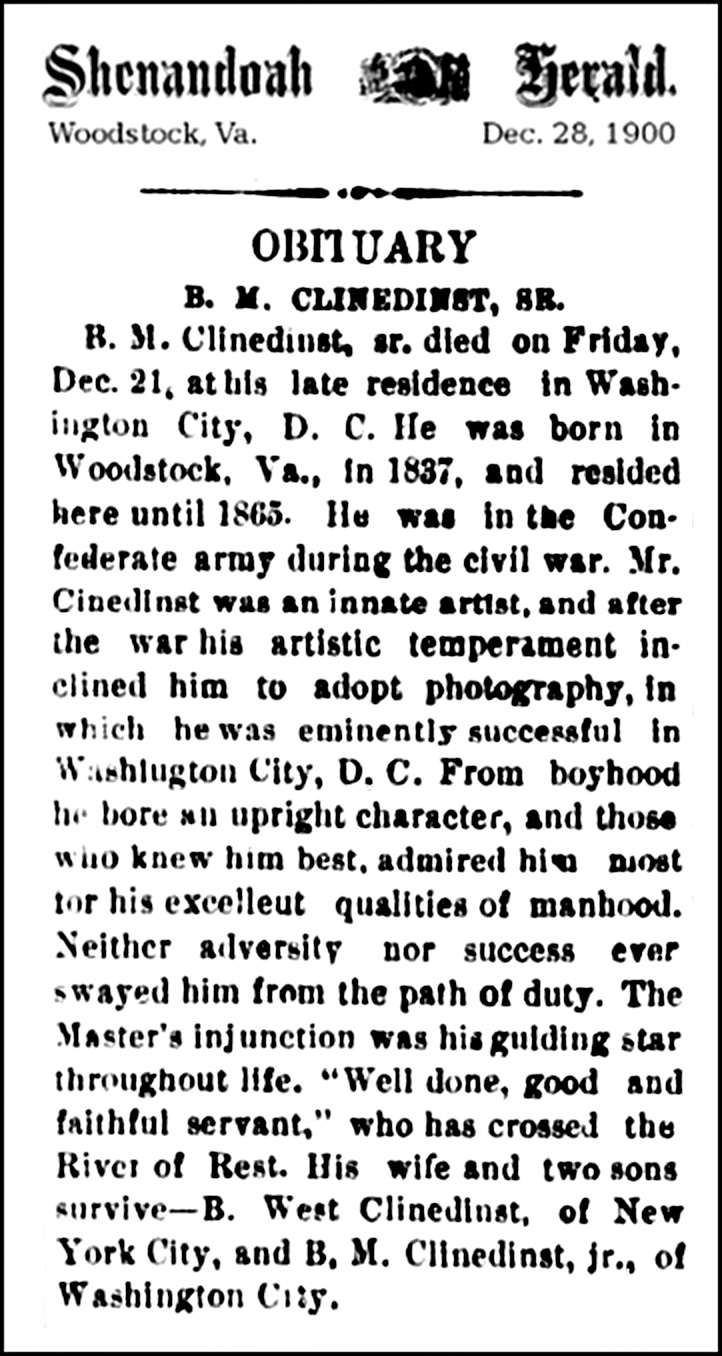
Obituary in the Shenandoah Herald on December 28, 1900

Barnett Michael Clinedinst (December 1835 – December 21, 1900) was an American photographer and inventor. He invented the viewfinder and the mirror-and-prism "reflex" arrangement for which the single-lens reflex camera is named.

He was born around December 1835 or 1837 in Woodstock, Virginia. (Note: He used "December 1835" in the 1900 United States census. Sources vary as to the exact year: the News-Leader says 1836, the New York Public Library says "ca. 1837", and the Camera Heritage Museum says "1838 abt".) He was a bugler during the American Civil War for Stonewall Jackson.

He died on December 21, 1900, in Washington, D.C. He was the father of Barnett McFee Clinedinst, who served as the official White House portrait photographer for the Presidential administrations of Theodore Roosevelt, William Howard Taft, and Woodrow Wilson, and Benjamin West Clinedinst, a painter.
