= Emigration from Colombia =

Emigration from Colombia is a migratory phenomenon that started in the early 20th century.

== Overview ==
Emigration from Colombia was determined mostly by security issues linked mainly to the Colombian armed conflict. From 1980 to 2000, emigration from Colombia was one of the largest in volume in Hispanic America. According to the 2005 Colombian census or DANE, about 3,331,107 Colombian citizens currently permanently reside outside of Colombia. Other estimates, however, suggest that the actual number could exceed 4 million, or almost 7,6 percent of the country's population. Approximately 1.2 million Colombians are believed to have left the country during 2000–5 and not returned.

Colombian migration after 2000, has also been characterized by extreme political violence and economic instability. Between 2002-2012, the political violence began to wane and the economy stabilized, but immigration to the United States still surged for a few more years in the aftermath. In that time (2002-2012) 61 percent (280,000) of persons granted LPR admission to the United States where those from Colombia.

In 2005, the population movement towards North America and Europe in particular has been motivated in some cases by the threat of violence but more typically by the search for greater economic opportunity. Due to the current sociopolitical situation in Colombia, emigration affects Colombians of all social standings and geographic zones. The highest rates of emigration have been registered in the main urban centers of the interior zone of the country: Bogotá, Medellín, Cali, Bucaramanga, Pereira, Manizales, and Cúcuta.

Between January 2019 and July 2023, a total of 1,300,353 people left Colombia, according to The City Paper Bogotá. There was another recent surge in emigration in 2020, with 2 major factors driving and contributing to the influx. The first being the pandemic once more crippling the economy, causing an increase in political violence again. Second being a high rate of Venezuelans immigrating to Colombia which compounded the issue of unemployment . The Venezuelans were mostly migrating due to the instability (economic and political) within Venezuela which was driven by hyperinflation and violence. In January 2025 some sources put the number of Colombians that have left the country in the last 30 months at more than two million people. Since 2018, the number of people leaving Colombia has steadily increased.

== Destinations ==
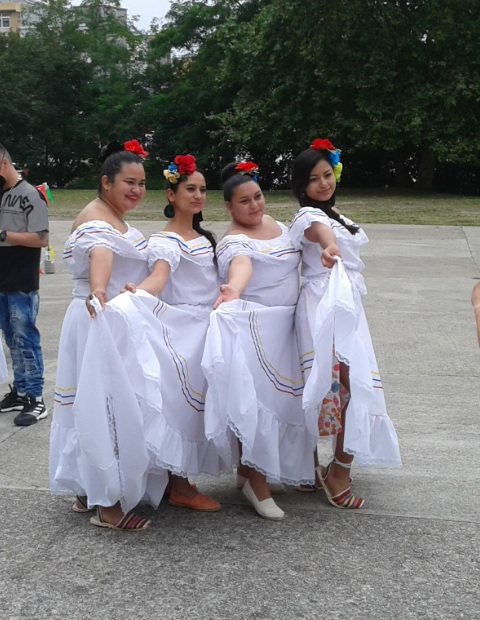
Colombians in Spain.

Until 2002, external migration was primarily to the United States, Venezuela, Spain and Ecuador. As of 2003, the estimated Colombian population in those countries was 2,020,000, 1,340,000, 240,000, and 193,000, respectively. Panama, Italy, the Netherlands, Germany and the United Kingdom also have significant (>20,000) populations of Colombian emigrants. In 2003, North America was the destination for 48 percent of Colombian emigrants; Hispanic America and the Caribbean, 40 percent; Europe, 11 percent; and Asia, Oceania, and Africa, 1 percent.

The Colombian diaspora refers to the mass movement of Colombian people who emigrated from the country in search of safety, better quality of life and/or get away from government corruption. Many of those who moved were educated middle and upper middle-class Colombians; because of this, the Colombian diaspora can be referred to as a brain drain. Colombian officials state that this movement peaked in the year 2000 and that the most popular destinations for emigration include North America and Europe. In Europe, Spain has the largest Colombian community on the continent, followed by Italy and the United Kingdom. Many Colombians are also dispersed throughout the rest of Hispanic America. Mexico, Costa Rica, Peru and Chile received political refugees in the mid-to-late 20th century, and Colombian guest workers in the early 2000s. The Colombian diaspora can also refer to the large wave of Colombian artists who migrated seeking better opportunities and new, more lucrative markets.

Colombian restaurants and bakeries are important institutions for the Colombian diaspora. These eateries have popularized formerly regional dishes like the well-portioned Bandeja paisa, Ajiaco among Colombians from all parts of the country.

== Top Colombian diaspora populations ==
Regions with significant populations

Country	Population	Rank	Population	Rank	Notes
United States	2,458,468	1	753,847	2	For further information see Colombian Americans
Venezuela	721,791	2	988,483	1	
Spain	513,583	3	350,802	3	Largest community outside the Americas. See Colombians in Spain
Mexico	36,234	4	36,234	4	For further information see Colombian Mexicans
Chile	146,582	5	24,427	9	
France	100,000	6			
Canada	96,325	7	70,405	5	For further information see Colombian Canadians
Panama	41,885	8	57,051	6	
Ecuador	77,426	9	200,539	4	
Italy	52,257	10	40,000	8	
Australia	35,033	11	16,247	14	For further information see Colombian Australians
Argentina	13,876	12	8,963	18	For further information see Colombian Argentines
Sweden	14,055	13	14,055	12	Second largest Latin American community after Chileans.
Portugal	13,191	14	655	36	
United Kingdom	12,331	15	22,703	10	Second largest South American community after Brazilians. See Colombians in the United Kingdom
Costa Rica	11,500	16	21,400	12	
Vietnam	7,275	17			
Israel	3,127	18	2,693	25	
Netherlands			15,455	15	
Switzerland			12,394	16	
Brazil			8,395	19	
Norway			6,131	20	
Peru			6,086	21	
Denmark			3,750	22	
Dominican Republic			3,687	23	
Bolivia			3,085	24	
Guinea			2,548	26	
Japan			2,471	27	
Haiti			1,758	28	
Austria			1,728	29	
Belgium			1,629	30	
Finland			1,286	31	
New Zealand			1,228	32	
Guatemala			1,202	33	
South Africa			979	34	
Honduras			876	35	
El Salvador			580	37	
Poland			18,000	38	
Nicaragua			456	39	
Greece			391	40	
Hungary			238	41	
Russia			206	42	
Bahamas			201	43	
Iceland			191	44	
Czech Republic			165	45	
Cuba			146	46	
Cyprus			133	47	
Philippines			128	48	
Romania			110	49	
Estonia			85	50	
Slovakia			56	51	
Turkey			54	52	
Egypt			54	53	
Bulgaria			49	54	
Slovenia			43	55	
Croatia			43	56	
Latvia			30	57	
Jordan			24	58	
North Macedonia			6	59	

== Social and economic impact ==
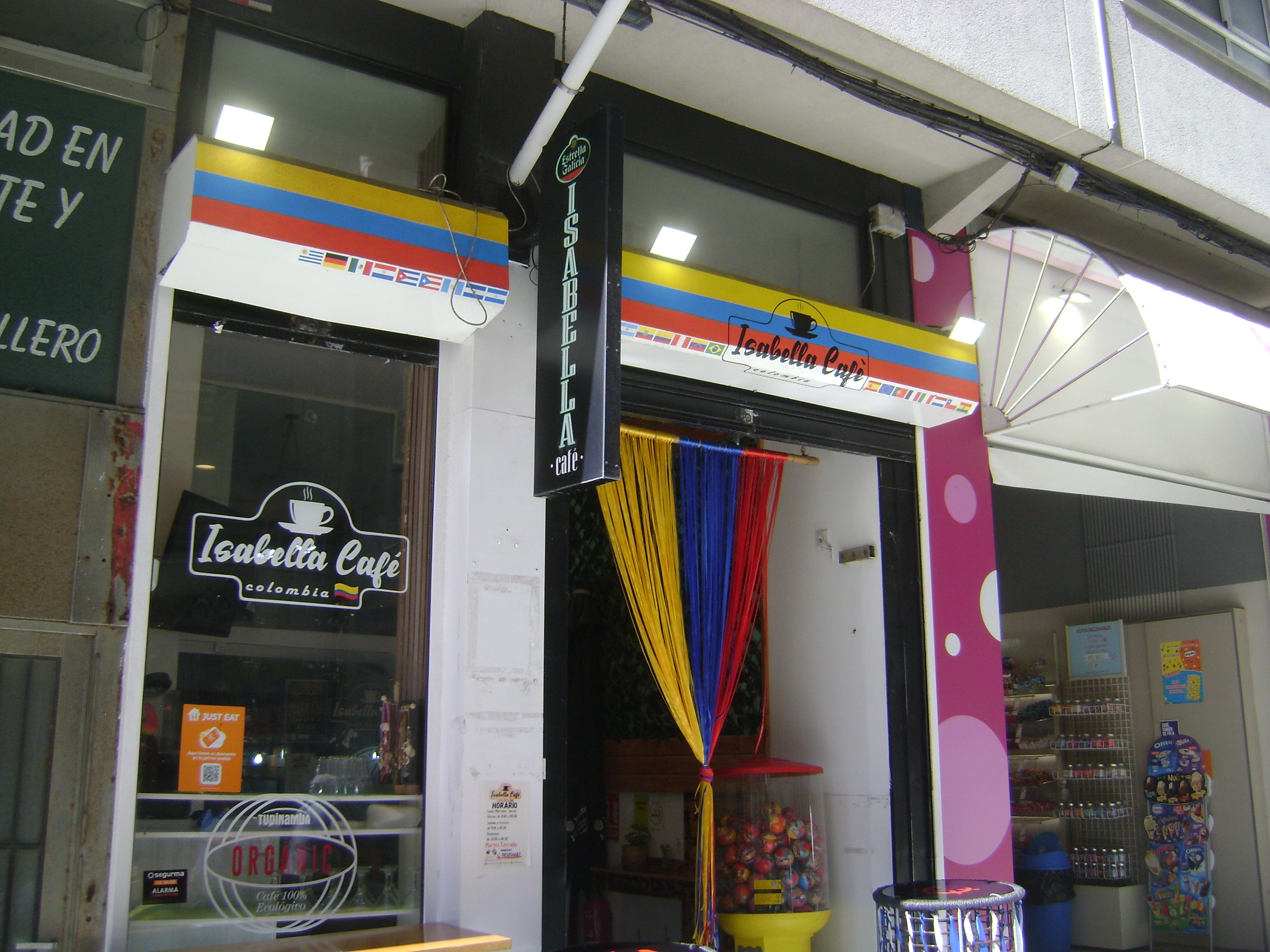
Colombian bar in La Coruña, Galicia, (Spain).

Colombians living abroad—1.5 million of whom departed during the economic downturn between 1996 and 2002—have had a positive effect on the balance of payments thanks to remittances to family and friends at home. According to Colombian newspaper El Tiempo, the value of remittances from Colombians living abroad is ranked third as the main source of foreign money in Colombia and has already surpassed the value of coffee exports.

But external migration to the United States or Europe has represented a definite loss of talent and energy because migrants to the developed world tend to be better educated and in the prime of working life. Some estimates would have roughly half the physicians trained in Colombia during certain years, at great expense to fellow Colombian taxpayers, now working in the United States. Then, too, there are communities (as in Mexico, for example) that have been so drained of young workers that they find themselves dependent on the flow of remittances. Several municipalities in the vicinity of Pereira in western Colombia, hard hit by troubles in the coffee industry and the competition of cheap Asian labor in garment exporting, exemplify the latter phenomenon.

== Human trafficking ==
The Colombian government has developed prevention programs against illegal groups that offer emigration help to unsuspecting people, many of whom are eventually forced into slavery, forced prostitution and human trafficking in foreign countries.

== See also ==
- Demographics of Colombia
- Foreign relations of Colombia
- Immigration to Colombia
- Colombian people
- Venezuelan refugee crisis
