= Foreign relations of Paraguay =

Paraguayan foreign policy has concentrated on maintaining good relations with its neighbors, and it has been an active proponent of regional co-operation. It is a member of the United Nations and has served one term in the UN Security Council in 1967–1969. It maintains membership in several international financial institutions, including the World Bank, the Inter-American Development Bank, and the International Monetary Fund. It also belongs to the Organization of American States, the Latin American Integration Association (ALADI), the Rio Group, INTERPOL, MERCOSUR (the Southern Cone Common Market) and UNASUR.

At the political level, diplomatic affairs and international relations of Paraguay are officially handled by the Ministry of Foreign Relations, which answers to the executive branch of the government. Minister of Foreign Relations 2018 -2019 was Luis Alberto Castiglioni.

Unlike any other country in South America, Paraguay has diplomatic relations with the Republic of China instead of the People's Republic of China. Paraguay presently is the largest country maintaining official diplomatic relations with the Republic of China.

== Diplomatic relations ==
List of countries which Paraguay maintains diplomatic relations with:

#	Country	Date
1	Argentina	28 December 1842
2	Chile	22 July 1843
3	Brazil	14 September 1844
4	Uruguay	1 January 1846
5	Portugal	14 February 1846
6	France	4 March 1853
7	United Kingdom	4 March 1853
8	United States	26 November 1861
9	Peru	25 June 1862
10	Belgium	17 June 1863
11	Colombia	27 July 1870
12	Italy	19 July 1875
—	Holy See	31 December 1877
13	Bolivia	15 October 1879
14	Spain	10 September 1880
15	Ecuador	15 December 1880
16	El Salvador	1880
17	Mexico	3 October 1883
—	Venezuela (suspended)	7 August 1891
18	Switzerland	27 June 1892
19	Netherlands	13 June 1896
20	Dominican Republic	18 February 1902
21	Norway	2 April 1906
22	Cuba	13 July 1906
23	Guatemala	1 May 1907
24	Japan	17 November 1919
25	Poland	2 May 1920
26	Sweden	24 February 1923
27	Austria	19 August 1927
28	Czech Republic	14 February 1936
29	Panama	31 October 1942
30	Costa Rica	5 January 1948
31	Honduras	22 March 1949
32	Israel	5 December 1950
33	Serbia	19 February 1951
34	Denmark	9 October 1951
35	Germany	1 October 1952
36	Turkey	11 September 1953
37	Nicaragua	18 January 1956
38	Haiti	2 October 1956
—	Republic of China	8 July 1957
39	Lebanon	12 May 1958
40	Egypt	1959
41	India	13 September 1961
42	South Korea	12 June 1962
43	Canada	5 July 1962
44	Philippines	12 December 1962
45	Thailand	17 December 1962
46	Finland	20 November 1963
47	Morocco	23 May 1964
48	Luxembourg	26 February 1965
49	Pakistan	23 October 1967
50	Greece	28 February 1972
51	South Africa	3 April 1974
52	Australia	2 December 1974
53	Indonesia	29 November 1982
54	Nigeria	27 May 1988
55	Saint Vincent and the Grenadines	22 June 1989
56	Malaysia	17 November 1989
57	Hungary	2 May 1991
58	Slovenia	25 February 1992
59	Croatia	13 March 1992
60	Russia	14 May 1992
61	Romania	28 May 1992
62	Latvia	3 June 1992
63	Armenia	2 July 1992
64	Estonia	2 July 1992
65	Ivory Coast	28 July 1992
66	Albania	29 July 1992
67	Belize	2 November 1992
68	Jamaica	10 November 1992
69	Belarus	18 November 1992
70	Suriname	20 November 1992
71	Bulgaria	2 December 1992
72	Singapore	10 December 1992
73	Slovakia	8 January 1993
74	New Zealand	17 February 1993
75	Iran	19 February 1993
76	Kuwait	23 February 1993
77	Ukraine	26 February 1993
78	Lithuania	3 March 1993
79	Seychelles	23 April 1993
80	Barbados	27 May 1993
81	Saint Lucia	18 June 1993
82	Cameroon	3 December 1993
83	Guyana	14 April 1994
84	Trinidad and Tobago	24 May 1994
85	Cambodia	27 October 1994
86	Algeria	3 February 1995
87	Andorra	23 March 1995
88	Vietnam	30 May 1995
89	Brunei	8 April 1996
90	Mozambique	3 October 1997
91	Ireland	15 May 2001
92	Uzbekistan	27 August 2001
93	Cyprus	8 October 2001
94	Qatar	8 November 2002
95	San Marino	3 April 2003
96	Mongolia	17 June 2003
97	Iceland	17 March 2004
98	Azerbaijan	20 April 2004
99	Malta	8 July 2004
100	Kazakhstan	20 September 2004
101	Syria	13 December 2004
—	State of Palestine	26 March 2005
102	Bahrain	6 May 2005
103	Sudan	10 May 2005
104	Laos	28 September 2005
105	Equatorial Guinea	3 November 2005
106	Jordan	15 November 2005
107	Oman	15 November 2005
108	Namibia	17 April 2006
109	Nepal	2 August 2006
110	Republic of the Congo	23 March 2007
111	Eswatini	3 April 2007
112	Montenegro	5 June 2007
113	Angola	21 June 2007
114	United Arab Emirates	13 July 2007
115	Botswana	16 July 2007
116	Tajikistan	30 August 2007
117	North Macedonia	26 October 2007
118	Benin	18 February 2009
119	Sri Lanka	3 April 2009
120	Saudi Arabia	9 July 2009
121	Bosnia and Herzegovina	22 September 2009
122	Kenya	25 September 2009
123	Georgia	9 March 2010
124	Senegal	March 2010
125	Eritrea	March 2010
126	Gambia	23 April 2010
127	Burkina Faso	18 May 2010
128	Burundi	2010
129	Niger	2010
130	Uganda	18 June 2010
131	Mali	25 June 2010
132	Djibouti	22 July 2010
133	Maldives	28 September 2010
134	Mauritius	28 September 2010
135	Zambia	28 September 2010
136	Ethiopia	29 September 2010
137	Fiji	22 December 2010
138	Samoa	28 January 2011
139	Libya	9 February 2011
140	Liechtenstein	6 April 2011
141	Solomon Islands	4 May 2011
142	Moldova	5 May 2011
143	Tuvalu	2 June 2011
144	Zimbabwe	29 March 2012
145	Kyrgyzstan	23 May 2012
146	Mauritania	5 June 2012
147	Monaco	14 June 2012
148	Saint Kitts and Nevis	22 March 2013
149	Dominica	5 March 2015
150	Antigua and Barbuda	21 September 2016
151	Grenada	21 September 2016
152	Papua New Guinea	21 September 2016
153	Turkmenistan	28 July 2017
154	Federated States of Micronesia	11 October 2018
155	Tunisia	1 November 2018
156	Bangladesh	1 April 2019
157	Marshall Islands	26 September 2019
158	Guinea	15 June 2021
159	Ghana	17 June 2021
160	Kiribati	20 October 2021
161	Palau	1 April 2022
162	Timor-Leste	18 September 2022
163	Rwanda	18 April 2023
164	Guinea-Bissau	13 July 2023
165	São Tomé and Príncipe	13 July 2023
166	Bahamas	17 June 2025

== Bilateral relations ==
=== Africa ===
Country	Formal Relations Began	Notes
SADR	9 February 2000	Paraguay recognizes the Sahrawi Arab Democratic Republic. In January 2014, Paraguay officially suspends its relations with Sahrawi Arab Democratic Republic.
South Africa		Paraguay has an embassy in Pretoria.; The South African Embassy at Asunción was closed in December 1996 and the Resident Ambassador to Argentina was subsequently appointed non-Resident Ambassador to Paraguay. South Africa also has an honorary consulate in Asunción.; Both countries are full members of the Cairns Group and G20.; In April 1974, the then president of Paraguay, Alfredo Stroessner made a five-day state visit to South Africa. Paraguay was given a $20 million loan for agricultural development and agreements were signed on economic cooperation. Gen. Stroessner became known as an ally of apartheid South Africa.; Paraguayan Ministry of Foreign Relations about relations with South Africa; South African Department of Foreign Affairs about relations with Paraguay

=== Americas ===
Country	Formal Relations Began	Notes
Argentina	1811	See Argentina–Paraguay relations: Argentina has an embassy in Asunción and consulates-general in Asunción, Ciudad del Este and Encarnación).; Paraguay has an embassy in Buenos Aires and consulates in Clorinda, Corrientes, Formosa, Posadas, Resistencia, Rosario and Puerto Iguazú.
Bolivia		See Bolivia–Paraguay relations In 2009 Bolivian President Evo Morales and Paraguayan President Fernando Lugo signed an agreement settling a border dispute, which had led to the Chaco War in the 1930s. President Lugo expressed the hope that natural resources could now "be developed and used by both countries" Relations, as with many countries in the area, have had increased tension since the Paraguay impeachment in 2012.: Bolivia has an embassy in Asunción.; Paraguay has an embassy in La Paz and consulate-general in Santa Cruz de la Sierra.
Brazil		See Brazil–Paraguay relations Border of Brazil and Paraguay Paraguay–Brazil relations have improved greatly after Brazilian President Lula's decision in 2009 to triple its payments to Paraguay for energy from a massive hydro-electric dam on their border, ending a long-running dispute. Under the accord, Brazil will pay Paraguay $360m a year for energy from the jointly-operated Itaipu plant. Brazilian President Luiz Inácio Lula da Silva called it a "historic agreement" and the deal slated as a political victory for former Paraguayan President Fernando Lugo. In February 2019, Brazilian President Jair Bolsonaro praised the late military strongman of Paraguay, Alfredo Stroessner, calling him "a man of vision." Bolsonaro made the comments during a ceremony at the Itaipu hydroelectric dam on the countries' shared border. At his side was his close ally, Paraguayan right-wing President Mario Abdo Benitez.: Brazil has an embassy in Asunción and maintains several consulates throughout the country.; Paraguay has an embassy in Brasília and maintains several consulates throughout the country.
Canada		Canada is accredited to Paraguay from its embassy in Buenos Aires, Argentina.; Paraguay has an embassy in Ottawa.
Chile	22 July 1843	Chile has an embassy in Asunción.; Paraguay has an embassy in Santiago.; In 2024, bilateral trade between Chile and Paraguay totaled $1.409 billion, with Paraguay maintaining a $495 million trade surplus; Paraguayan exports to Chile reached $952 million, while Chilean exports to Paraguay totaled $457 million.
Colombia		See Colombia–Paraguay relations, List of ambassadors of Paraguay to Colombia: Colombia has an embassy in Asunción.; Paraguay has an embassy in Bogotá.
Mexico	18 April 1881	See Mexico–Paraguay relations Both countries established diplomatic relations on April 18, 1881.: Mexico has an embassy in Asunción.; Paraguay has an embassy in Mexico City.
Peru	2 May 1858	See Paraguay–Peru relations: Both countries established diplomatic relations on May 2, 1858.; Paraguay has an embassy in Lima.; Peru has an embassy in Asunción. and an honorary consulate in Ciudad del Este.; Both countries are full members of the Rio Group, of the Latin Union, of the Association of Spanish Language Academies, of the Organization of American States, of the Organization of Ibero-American States and of the Union of South American Nations.; Peruvian Ministry of Foreign Relations about the relation with Paraguay (in Spanish only)
United States		See Paraguay–United States relations A military training agreement with Asunción, giving immunity to US soldiers, caused some concern after media reports initially reported that a base housing 20,000 US soldiers was being built at Mariscal Estigarribia within 200 km of Argentina and Bolivia, and 300 km of Brazil, near an airport which could receive large planes (B-52, C-130 Hercules, etc.) which the Paraguayan Air Forces do not have. In September 2009 Paraguay's President Fernando Lugo revoked plans for US troops to hold joint military exercises and development projects after stating that he no longer thinks that hosting troops taking part in the US department of defence's "New Horizons" programme was worthwhile. President Lugo referenced strong regional opposition from countries such as Argentina, Brazil, Venezuela, Bolivia and Ecuador to the expansion of US military bases in Colombia in his decision.: Paraguay has an embassy in Washington, D.C., and consulates-general in Los Angeles, Miami and New York City.; United States has an embassy in Asunción.
Uruguay	6 April 1845	See Paraguay–Uruguay relations: Paraguay has an embassy in Montevideo.; Uruguay has an embassy in Asunción.; In 2024, bilateral trade between Paraguay and Uruguay totaled $296 million, with Paraguay maintaining a $40.3 million trade surplus; Paraguayan exports to Uruguay reached $168 million (led by corn, bovine meat, and soybeans), while Uruguayan exports to Paraguay totaled $128 million (led by malt, pesticides, and packaged medicaments).
Venezuela		See Paraguay–Venezuela relations Relations between Paraguay and Venezuela improved during Paraguay's leftist President Fernando Lugo (2008–2012), a change from 61 unbroken years of Colorado party rule. President Lugo supported Venezuela's entry into Mercosur however the Colorado Party's influence in Paraguay's Congress and Senate retarded this expansion. Paraguay and Venezuela restarted negotiations on an unpaid debt of $250 million owed by Paraguayan oil company Petropar to its counterpart Petróleos de Venezuela after the Presidents of Paraguay and Venezuela met to deal with the financing. In January, 2019, Paraguay cut its diplomatic relations with Venezuela, considering the Venezuelan government of President Nicolas Maduro illegitimate due to disputed election. Diplomatic relations were re-established on 15 November 2023.

=== Asia ===
Country	Formal Relations Began	Notes
Azerbaijan	20 April 2004	See Azerbaijan-Paraguay relations Both countries established diplomatic relations on April 20, 2004.
China	no relations	See China–Paraguay relations: China is currently accredited to Paraguay from its consulate-general in São Paulo, Brazil.; Paraguay is currently accredited to People's Republic of China through its embassy in Seoul, South Korea, Hong Kong and Macau through its embassy in Tokyo, Japan.
Republic of China (Taiwan)	8 July 1957	See Paraguay–Taiwan relations Paraguay recognizes the Republic of China as a country.: Taiwan has an embassy in Asunción and a Consulate-General in Ciudad del Este.; Since 1999, Paraguay has had an embassy in Taipei.
India	13 September 1961	See India–Paraguay relations: India is represented in Paraguay through its embassy in Buenos Aires, Argentina and an honorary consulate in Asunción.; Since 2005, Paraguay has had an embassy in New Delhi.; In 2024, bilateral trade between India and Paraguay totaled $546 million, with India maintaining a $324 million trade surplus; Indian exports to Paraguay reached $435 million (led by refined petroleum, pesticides, and cars), while Paraguayan exports to India totaled $111 million (led by soybean oil, scrap iron, and scrap aluminium).
Israel	1949	See Israel–Paraguay relations: Israel has an embassy in Asunción.; Since 2024, Paraguay has an embassy in Jerusalem (previously in Tel Aviv).
Japan	17 November 1919	See Japan–Paraguay relations: Japan has an embassy in Asunción.; Paraguay has an embassy in Tokyo.
Mongolia	2003-06-17	Mongolia is accredited to Paraguay through its embassy in Brasilia, Brazil.; Paraguay is accredited to Mongolia through its embassy in Seoul, South Korea.; Mongolia signed a visa-free agreement with Paraguay on 26 September 2019.
South Korea	15 June 1962	See Paraguay–South Korea relations: Paraguay has an embassy in Seoul.; South Korea has an embassy in Asunción.; Paraguay's Investment and Export Network (Rediex) and the Korea Importers Association (KOIMA) signed a memorandum of understanding to boost bilateral trade, investmen and technology transfer in sectors including energy, manufacturing, food, and clean technologies.
Turkey	1953	See Paraguay–Turkey relations: Paraguay has an embassy in Ankara.; Turkey has an embassy in Asunción.; Trade volume between the two countries was US$82.1 million in 2019 (Paraguay's exports/imports: US$35/47.1 million).
United Arab Emirates	13 July 2007	Paraguay has an Embassy in Abu Dhabi; United Arab Emirates has an embassy in Asunción; On June 30, 2026, Paraguayan President Santiago Peña received United Arab Emirates Minister of Foreign Trade Thani bin Ahmed Al Zeyoudi and an accompanying delegation in Asunción.; In 2024, bilateral trade between Paraguay and the United Arab Emirates surpassed US$350 million, driven by Paraguayan exports of gold, soybean meal, and maize, while subsequent Emirati investment has targeted green hydrogen and data centers.

=== Europe ===
Country	Formal Relations Began	Notes
Croatia	13 March 1992	Paraguay is represented in Croatia through its embassy in Vienna, Austria.; Croatia is represented in Paraguay through its embassy in Buenos Aires, Argentina.
Denmark		Paraguay is represented in Denmark, through its embassy in Stockholm, Sweden.; Denmark is represented in Paraguay, through its embassy in Buenos Aires, Argentina.; Denmark also has an honorary consulate in Asunción.
France	1853	Both countries has diplomatic relations since the Treaty of Friendship, Trade and Navigation signed in 1853.; France has an embassy in Asunción and an honorary consulate in Ciudad del Este.; Paraguay has an embassy in Paris.; French Ministry of Foreign Relations about relations with Paraguay; Paraguayan Ministry of Foreign Relations about relations with France
Germany	1860	See Germany–Paraguay relations: Germany has an embassy in Asunción.; Paraguay has an embassy in Berlin and a consulate-general in Frankfurt.
Iceland		Iceland is represented in Paraguay by its embassy in Washington, United States.; Paraguay is represented in Iceland by its embassy in London, United Kingdom.
Montenegro	2006	See Montenegro–Paraguay relations
Russia		See Paraguay–Russia relations: Both countries established diplomatic relations on May 14, 1992.; Paraguay has an embassy in Moscow.; Russia is represented in Paraguay through its embassy in Buenos Aires (Argentina) and an honorary consulate in Asunción.; On September 13, 2007, Russia's acting foreign minister, Sergei Lavrov, declared to soon open a resident embassy in Paraguay's capital.; Paraguayan Ministry of Foreign Relations
Slovenia		Paraguay is represented in Slovenia through its embassy in Vienna, Austria and has an honorary consulate in Ljubljana.; Slovenia is represented in Paraguay through its embassy in Buenos Aires, Argentina.
Spain	10 September 1880	See Paraguay–Spain relations: Both countries established diplomatic relations on September 10, 1880.; Paraguay has an embassy in Madrid and consulates-general in Barcelona and Málaga.; Spain has an embassy in Asunción.; Both countries are full members of the Latin Union, of the Association of Spanish Language Academies, and of the Organization of Ibero-American States.; Spanish Ministry of Foreign about the relation with Paraguay (in Spanish only)
Switzerland		Switzerland is represented in Paraguay through its embassy in Montevideo, Uruguay.; Paraguay is represented in Switzerland through its embassy in Paris, France
United Kingdom	4 March 1853	See Paraguay–United Kingdom relations British Foreign Secretary David Lammy with Paraguayan Foreign Minister Rubén Ramírez Lezcano in London, July 2025. Paraguay established diplomatic relations with the United Kingdom on 4 March 1853.: Paraguay maintains an embassy in London.; The United Kingdom is accredited to Paraguay through its embassy in Asunción.; Both countries share common membership of the International Criminal Court, the United Nations, the World Health Organization, and the World Trade Organization. Bilaterally the two countries have an Investment Agreement.

=== Oceania ===
Country	Formal Relations Began	Notes
Australia		See Australia–Paraguay relations Australia's positive relations with Paraguay are growing. In 2011, Paraguay opened an embassy in Canberra, Australia opened a consulate in Asunción. As agricultural producers and exporters, they work together to achieve fairer international trade in agricultural products through membership of the Cairns Group and cooperation in other multilateral fora. Australia is also increasing its engagement with Paraguay through development cooperation and people-to-people exchanges. An increasing number of Paraguayan students are pursuing their education at Australian institutions.: Australia is accredited to Paraguay from its embassy in Buenos Aires, Argentina.; Paraguay is accredited to Australia from its embassy in Tokyo, Japan.
New Zealand		New Zealand is accredited to Paraguay from its embassy in Buenos Aires, Argentina. New Zealand has an Honorary Consulate in Asunción.; Paraguay is accredited to New Zealand from its embassy in Tokyo, Japan.

== International organizations ==
Paraguay is a member of the following international organizations:

CAN (associate), FAO, G-11, G-77, IADB, IAEA, IBRD (also known as the World Bank), ICAO, ICCt, ICRM, IDA, IFAD, IFC, IFRCS, ILO, IMF, IMO, Interpol, IOC, IOM, IPU, ISO (correspondent), ITSO, ITU, ITUC, LAES, LAIA, Mercosur, MIGA, MINURSO, MINUSTAH, MONUSCO, NAM (observer), OAS, OPANAL, OPCW, PCA, Rio Group, UN, UNASUR, UNCTAD, UNESCO, UNFICYP, UNIDO, Union Latina, UNMIL, UNMIS, UNOCI, UNWTO, UPU, WCO, WHO, WIPO, WMO, WTO.

== See also ==
- List of diplomatic missions in Paraguay
- List of diplomatic missions of Paraguay
