= Venezuelan Paraguayans =

Venezuelans in Paraguay Paraguayos Venezolanos
Total population
- ~4000.

Regions with significant populations
- Asunción, Ciudad del Este and Luque

Languages
- Paraguayan Spanish and Venezuelan Spanish

Religion
- Roman Catholicism

Related ethnic groups
- Venezuelans in Uruguay, Venezuelan diaspora

Venezuelan Paraguayans (Spanish: Paraguayos Venezolanos) consist of Venezuelan migrants and their descendants residing in Paraguay. Among all the South American countries, Paraguay has one of the smallest number of migrants from Venezuela, with the number of documented Venezuelan migrants standing at 3,818.

== History ==
Paraguay, a country in South America, is considered to be a transit country, since the majority of Venezuelan immigrants into Paraguay eventually migrate to Brazil, Argentina, or Uruguay.

In 2013, according to official data from the Paraguay General Directorate of Migrations (DGM), the number of Venezuelans living in Paraguay has steadily increased.

In 2017, 4,468 Venezuelans entered Paraguay. Venezuela had been experiencing a period with demonstrations, riots, attacks, and general civil unrest; during this time it was not uncommon for people to seek asylum in neighboring states. 3,779 of them left; out of the remaining 669, 192 managed to apply for permanent residency.

In January, 2018, 399 Venezuelans entered Paraguay. It is estimated that an additional 300-600 people immigrated off the record. Some of those may have crossed the land border into Brazil, Argentina, or Bolivia.

A the Permanent Council session, the Organization of American States (OAS) reports that between 2016 and May 2018, 4,738 Venezuelans arrived in Paraguay. However, the interim general director of Migrations, Ángeles Arriola, said these Venezuelans do not reside in Paraguay.

Paraguay is bounded by Bolivia to the northwest and north, Brazil to the northeast and east, and Argentina to the southeast, south, and west. Asunción is located on the east bank of the Paraguay River, opposite the mouth of its primary western tributary, the Pilcomayo River. The Paraguay River, which runs from north to south, divides Paraguay into two distinct geographic regions—the Región Oriental (Eastern Region) and the Región Occidental (Western Region), also called the Chaco Boreal.

In January 2019, The General Directorate of Migrations registered having granted temporary filings to Venezuelan citizens with 746 being permanent. It was estimated that between 1,500 and 2,000 Venezuelan citizens were based in Paraguay.

== Food ==
Venezuelan immigrants were perhaps initially best known for their cooking: for example, the Di Marcantonio family set up a food stall and received much media attention. They had fled their homeland due to a political, social, and economic crisis, and established a small stall where they offered typical Venezuelan dishes such as arepas and cachapas. The novelty of the venture meant that in a short time the business was consolidated. Similar premises appeared in other parts of the capital, the metropolitan area, and even inland.

Since 2015, "World Arepa Day" is celebrated in the emblematic Palma street on the second Saturday of September. As an icon of Asuncan history and culture, World Arepa Day is celebrated in all countries where Venezuelan communities exist. The festival displays the arepa as an iconic dish of the Cumanagoto indigenous identity and culture (inhabitants of Panama, Colombia, and Venezuela) and shows how they make the famous bread from corn. Today it is a globally recognized gastronomic festival, attracting tourists and highlighting how arepa bread interrelates with the gastronomy in the country it takes place in.

== See also ==
- Paraguay–Venezuela relations
- Venezuelan diaspora
- Crisis in Venezuela
- 2013–present economic crisis in Venezuela
- Foreign relations of Paraguay
- Immigration to Paraguay
- Paraguay
