= Montenegro–Paraguay relations =

- Montenegro: Paraguay

Montenegro–Paraguay relations refers to the bilateral relations between Montenegro and Paraguay. Relations between the two countries date back to when Montenegro was part of Yugoslavia. Following Montenegro's independence in 2006, formal relations were established between the two countries.

There is also a Montenegrin Paraguayans diaspora community found in Paraguay.

== History ==
=== Yugoslavia ===
The history between Montenegro and Paraguay began during the Kingdom of Yugoslavia, when, in 1928, Nikola Mihanović, a businessman from Dubrovnik, donated his residence in Buenos Aires to be used as an embassy and consulate for South America, including Paraguay. The building continued to be used by the Socialist Federal Republic of Yugoslavia and Serbia and Montenegro.

In 1950, Yugoslavia signed trade deals with a number of South American countries, including Paraguay. During this time, Yugoslavia mostly imported leather, wool, cotton, cocoa and coffee from Paraguay, while it exported cement, timber, hops and chemical products.

Under the rule of Alfredo Stroessner, Paraguay had no relations with countries under Marxist governments. However, Yugoslavia was an exception.

Between 1998–2002, Gojko Čelebić, a Montenegrin, served as the Yugoslav ambassador to Argentina. During this time, he also held a non-resident position in Paraguay.

=== Post-independence ===
On 5 June 2006, following the 2006 Montenegrin independence referendum, Paraguay recognized Montenegrin independence. Diplomatic relations were established the same day.

On 29 December 2009, Montenegro established an honorary consulate in Asunción. Mark Firmin, owner of the oil and gas company Montecristo, was appointed honorary consul.

In 2012, Tara, a Montenegrin arms manufacturer, began exporting their TM 9 pistols to Paraguay in the form of three export contracts.

The first official visit to Paraguay by a president of Montenegro happened in December 2018, when Milo Đukanović visited the country and met with the president of Paraguay Mario Abdo Benítez and other officials. During the visit, Đukanović was awarded the Order of National Honor. He was also granted the key to the city in Asunción.

== Montenegrin Paraguayans ==
Montenegrin Paraguayans are a small diaspora community found in Asunción. They number approximately 2,000. In 2018, a Matica, a cultural organization, was formally established.
