= Azerbaijan–Paraguay relations =

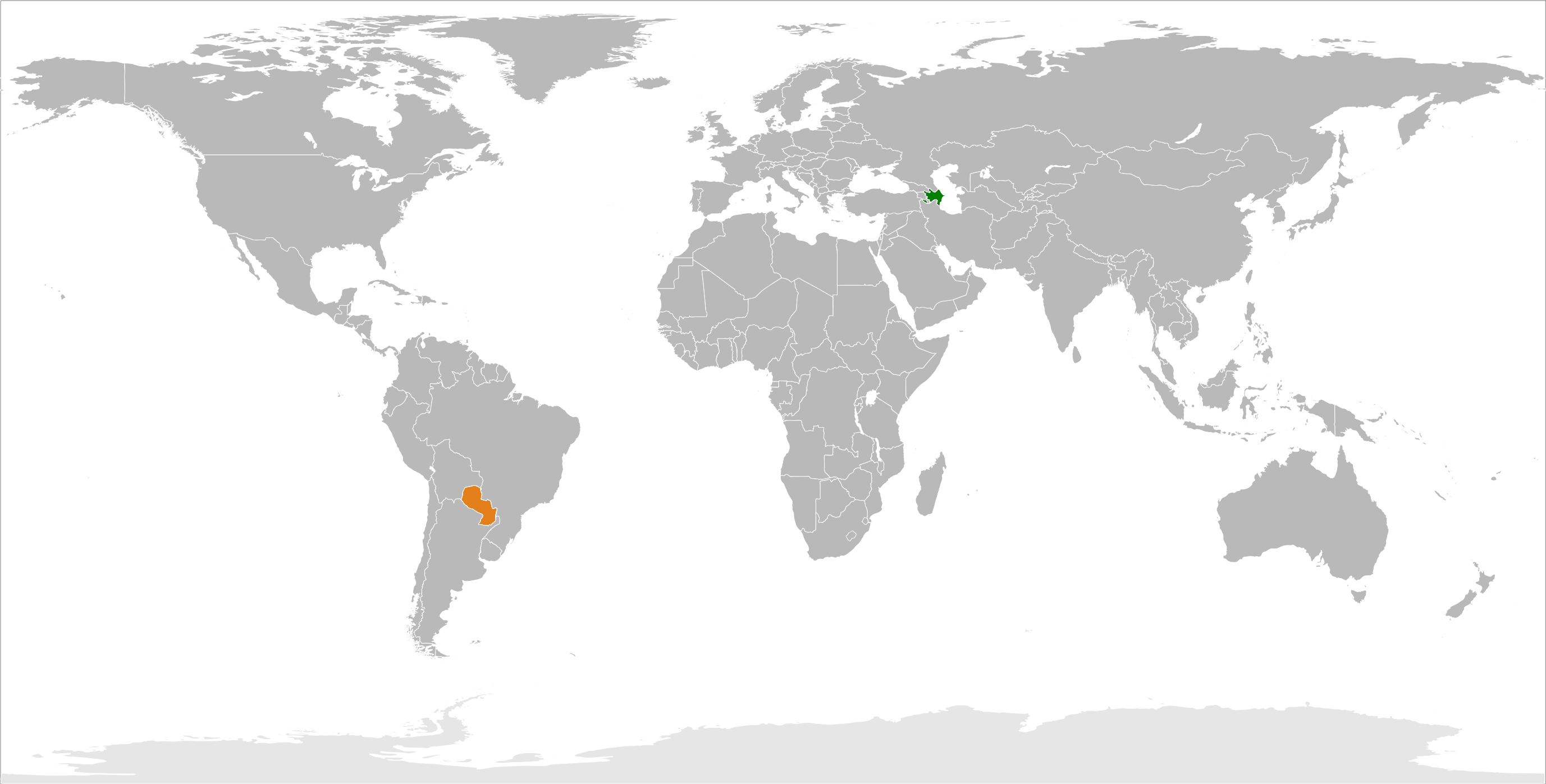

- Azerbaijan: Paraguay

Azerbaijan–Paraguay relations refer to the bilateral relations between Azerbaijan and Paraguay. Neither country maintains a resident embassy in the other's capital.

== Diplomatic relations ==
Diplomatic relations between Azerbaijan and Paraguay were established on April 20, 2004. Azerbaijan conducts diplomatic affairs with Paraguay through its embassy in Argentina since March 2012.

Rashad Aslanov is the Ambassador of Azerbaijan to Paraguay. In March 2019, Oscar Carlos Brelles Marino was appointed Honorary Consul of Azerbaijan to Paraguay.

On March 23, 2019, Azerbaijani Foreign Minister Elmar Mammadyarov paid the first official Foreign-Ministry-level visit to Paraguay.

On September 9, 2026, Asunción hosted the inaugural Azerbaijan–Paraguay Political and Economic Forum, bringing together political, academic, and business representatives to expand bilateral trade, investment, and strategic dialogue.

=== Legal framework ===
Two documents have been signed between Azerbaijan and Paraguay.

== Inter-parliamentary relations ==
In 2014, the inter-parliamentary friendship group between Azerbaijan and Paraguay was established in the National Congress of Paraguay.

On March 5–6, 2015, a delegation of the Milli Majlis (Parliament) visited Paraguay.

On September 10, 2015, the National Congress of Paraguay adopted the Declaration "On recognition of the sovereignty, territorial integrity and internationally recognized borders of Azerbaijan". The document notes that the Nagorno-Karabakh region is an integral part of the territory of Azerbaijan.

On March 16, 2018, the President of the Chamber of Deputies of the National Congress of Paraguay, Fernando Luc, and the Chairman of the inter-parliamentary friendship group, Juan Ramirez, visited Azerbaijan to participate in the VI Global Forum held in Baku.

== Economic cooperation ==
Trade turnover (in thousands of US dollars)
Year	Export from AZ	Import to AZ	Trade turnover
2014	–	13.2	13.2
2015	–	122.5	122.5
2016	–	647.3	647.3
2017	–	657.24	657.24
2018	–	602.76	602.76

It is planned to create a chamber of commerce.

== Tourism ==
On March 23, 2019, in Asunción, the two governments signed an agreement "On the mutual cancellation of visa requirements for persons holding a diplomatic, official or service passport". Later, President of Azerbaijan Ilham Aliyev signed a law approving this agreement.

== International cooperation ==
In the international arena, cooperation is carried out within the framework of various international organizations: the UN, the Non-Aligned Movement, etc.

Paraguay supports Azerbaijan's position in the United Nations Security Council.

== Diplomatic missions ==
Neither country has a resident ambassador.

- Azerbaijan is accredited to Paraguay from its embassy in Buenos Aires, Argentina.
- Paraguay is accredited to Azerbaijan from its embassy in Ankara, Turkey.

== See also ==
- Foreign relations of Azerbaijan
- Foreign relations of Paraguay
