= Paraguay–Venezuela relations =

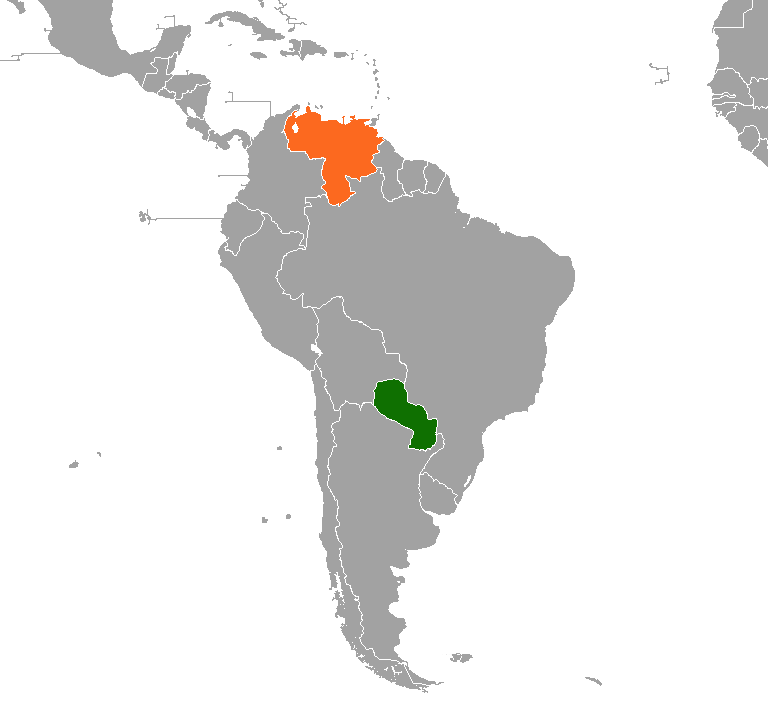

- Paraguay: Venezuela

Paraguay–Venezuela relations refers to the diplomatic relations between Paraguay and Venezuela.

== History ==
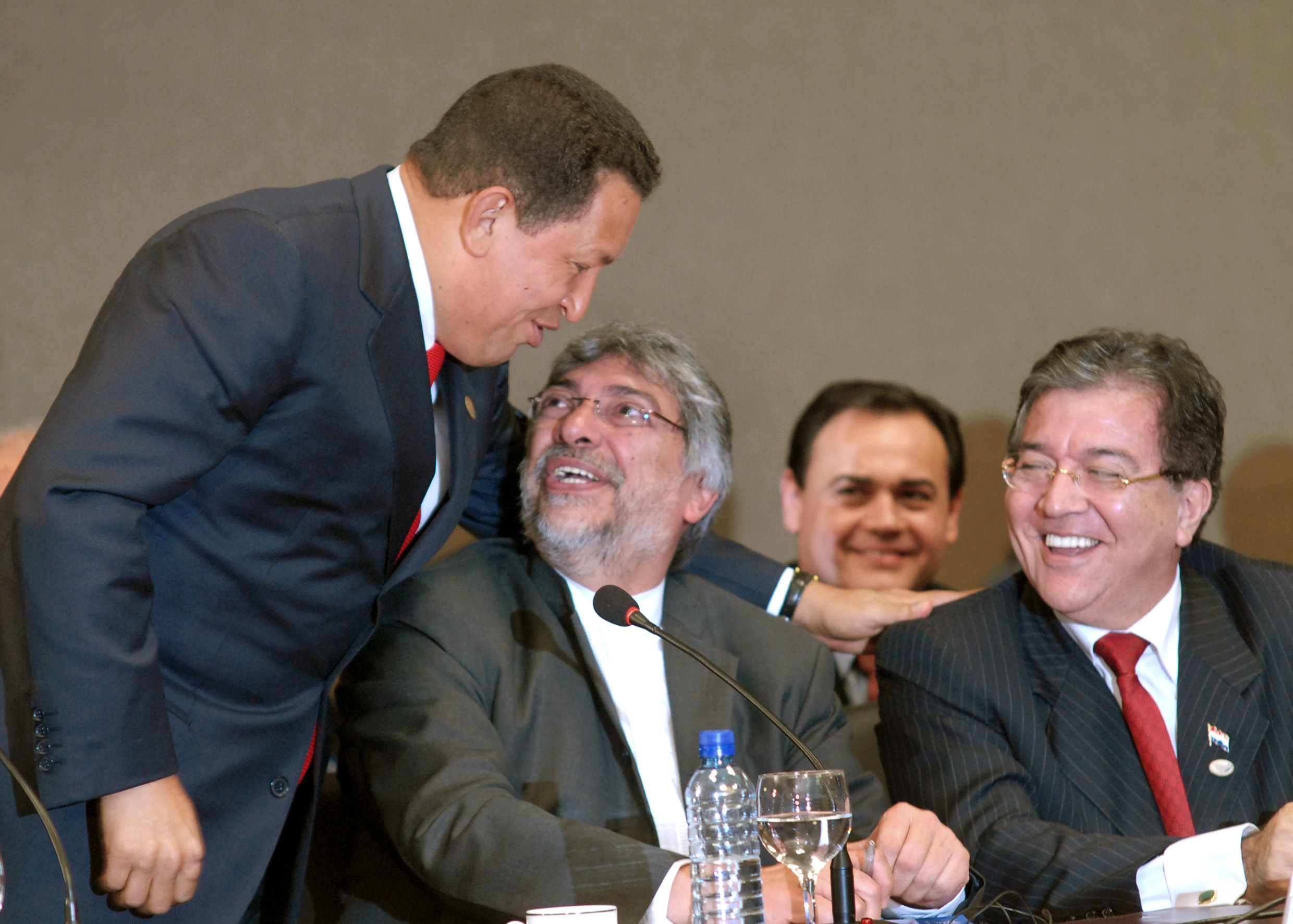
Venezuelan President Hugo Chávez with Paraguayan President Fernando Lugo at a UNASUR meeting in 2008

Relations between Paraguay and Venezuela improved since Paraguay's new leftist President Fernando Lugo was inaugurated in 2008, a change from 61 unbroken years of Colorado party rule. President Lugo supported Venezuela's entry into Mercosur; however, the Colorado Party's influence in Paraguay's Congress and Senate did not support the move.

Paraguay and Venezuela restarted negotiations on an unpaid debt of $250 million owed by Paraguayan oil company Petropar to its counterpart Petróleos de Venezuela after the Presidents of Paraguay and Venezuela met to deal with the financing.

In September 2009 Paraguay's President Fernando Lugo revoked plans for US troops to hold joint military exercises and development projects. President Lugo referenced strong regional opposition from countries such as Venezuela, Argentina, Brazil, Bolivia and Ecuador to the expansion of US military bases in Colombia in his decision.

On 17 October 2012, Venezuela's government expelled Paraguay's remaining diplomats from the country. Charge d'affaires Victor Casartelli said that he and three other Paraguayan diplomats in Caracas were told leave within three days. This follows a dispute between the countries that began in June 2012 with the congressional impeachment of Paraguayan President Fernando Lugo. January 10, 2026 Paraguay imposed visas on Venezuelans

However, bilateral relations severed in January 2019 as Paraguayan President Mario Abdo Benítez announced that Paraguay will not recognize Nicolas Maduro as Venezuela's elected president, Paraguay has decided to close embassy, withdraw diplomats “in defense of democracy”.

January 10, 2026 Paraguay imposed visas on Venezuelans.

In September 2026, Venezuelan Acting President Delcy Rodríguez met her Paraguayan counterpart Santiago Peña at the Miraflores Presidential Palace in Caracas as the two nations relaunched bilateral diplomatic and consular relations.

== See also ==
- Foreign relations of Paraguay
- Foreign relations of Venezuela
- Venezuelan Paraguayans
