= List of diplomatic missions in Paraguay =

This is a list of diplomatic missions in Paraguay. Currently there are 32 embassies in the capital Asunción. Major cities, namely Ciudad del Este and Encarnación host consular missions. Other countries accredit their embassies mostly in Brasília, Brazil, or Buenos Aires, Argentina, on a non-residential basis to Paraguay.

This listing excludes honorary consulates, trade missions, and cultural institutes.

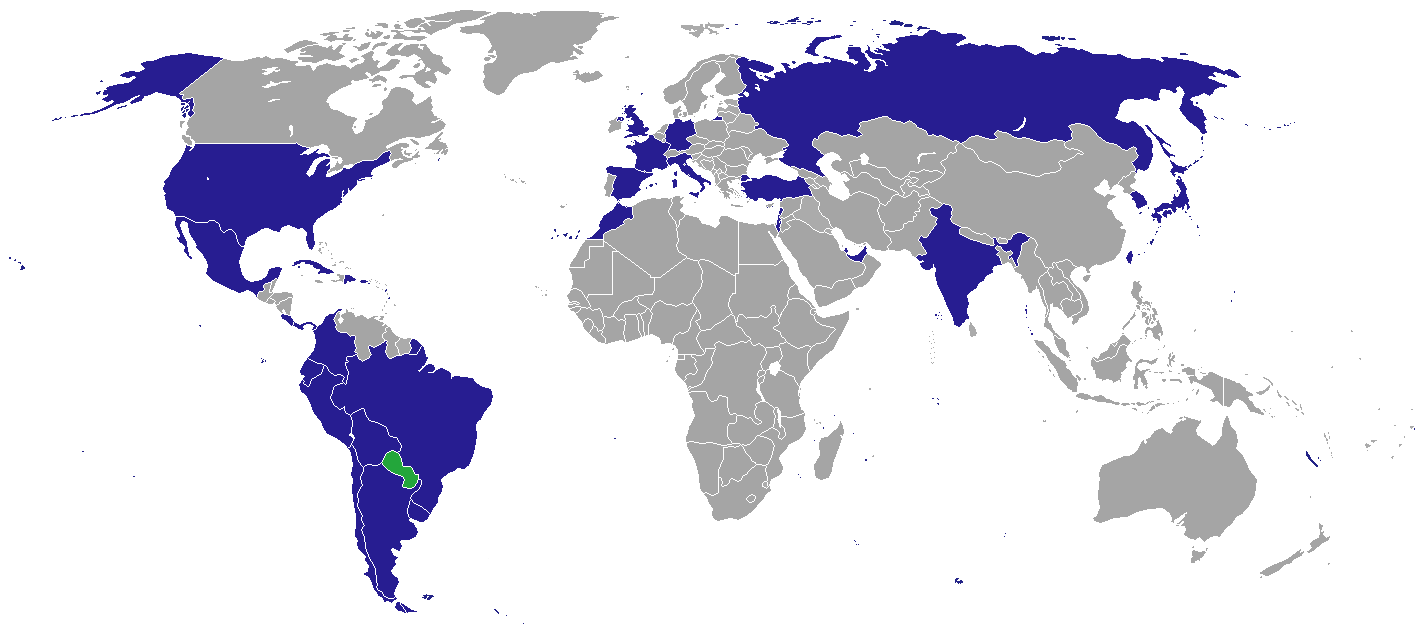
Map of countries with embassies in Paraguay

== Diplomatic missions in Asunción ==
=== Embassies ===
1. Argentina
2. Bolivia
3. Brazil
4. Chile
5. Colombia
6. Costa Rica
7. Cuba
8. Dominican Republic
9. Ecuador
10. France
11. Germany
12. Holy See
13. India
14. Israel
15. Italy
16. Japan
17. Lebanon
18. Mexico
19. Morocco
20. Panama
21. Peru
22. Qatar
23. Republic of China (Taiwan)
24. Russia
25. South Korea
26. Sovereign Military Order of Malta
27. Spain
28. Turkey
29. United Arab Emirates
30. United Kingdom
31. United States
32. Uruguay

=== Other missions or delegations ===
1. European Union (Delegation)
2. Organization of American States (Representative office)
Embassy of Brazil

Embassy of France and the Delegation of the European Union

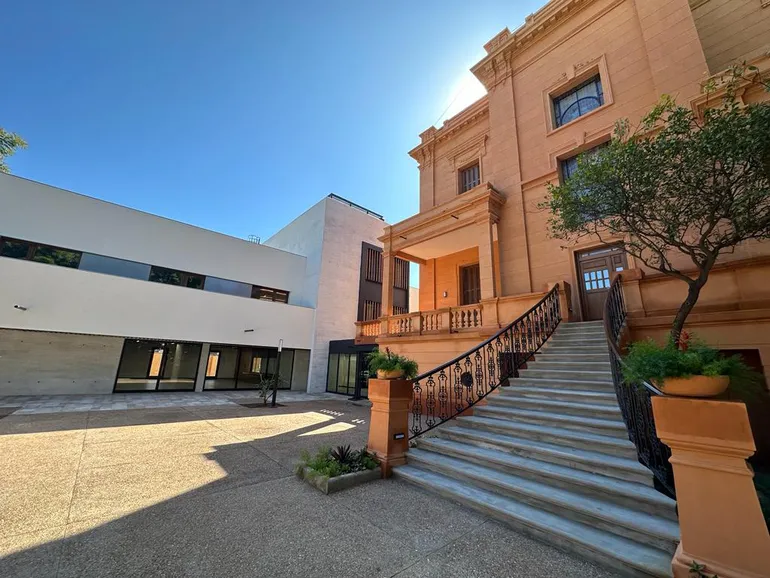
Embassy of Spain

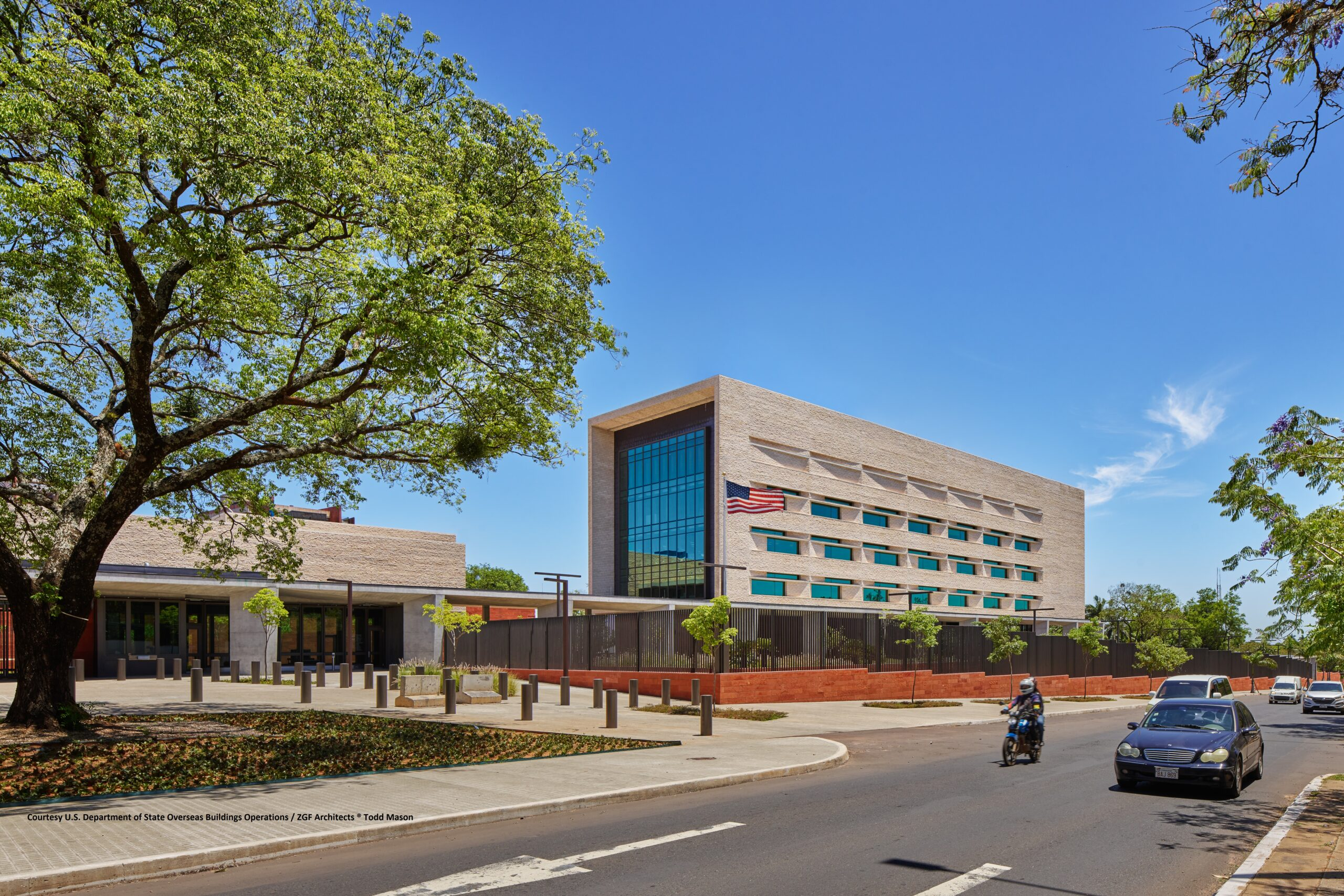
Embassy of the United States

== Consular missions ==
=== Ciudad del Este ===
- Argentina (Consulate-General)
- Brazil (Consulate-General)
- Republic of China (Taiwan) (Consulate-General)
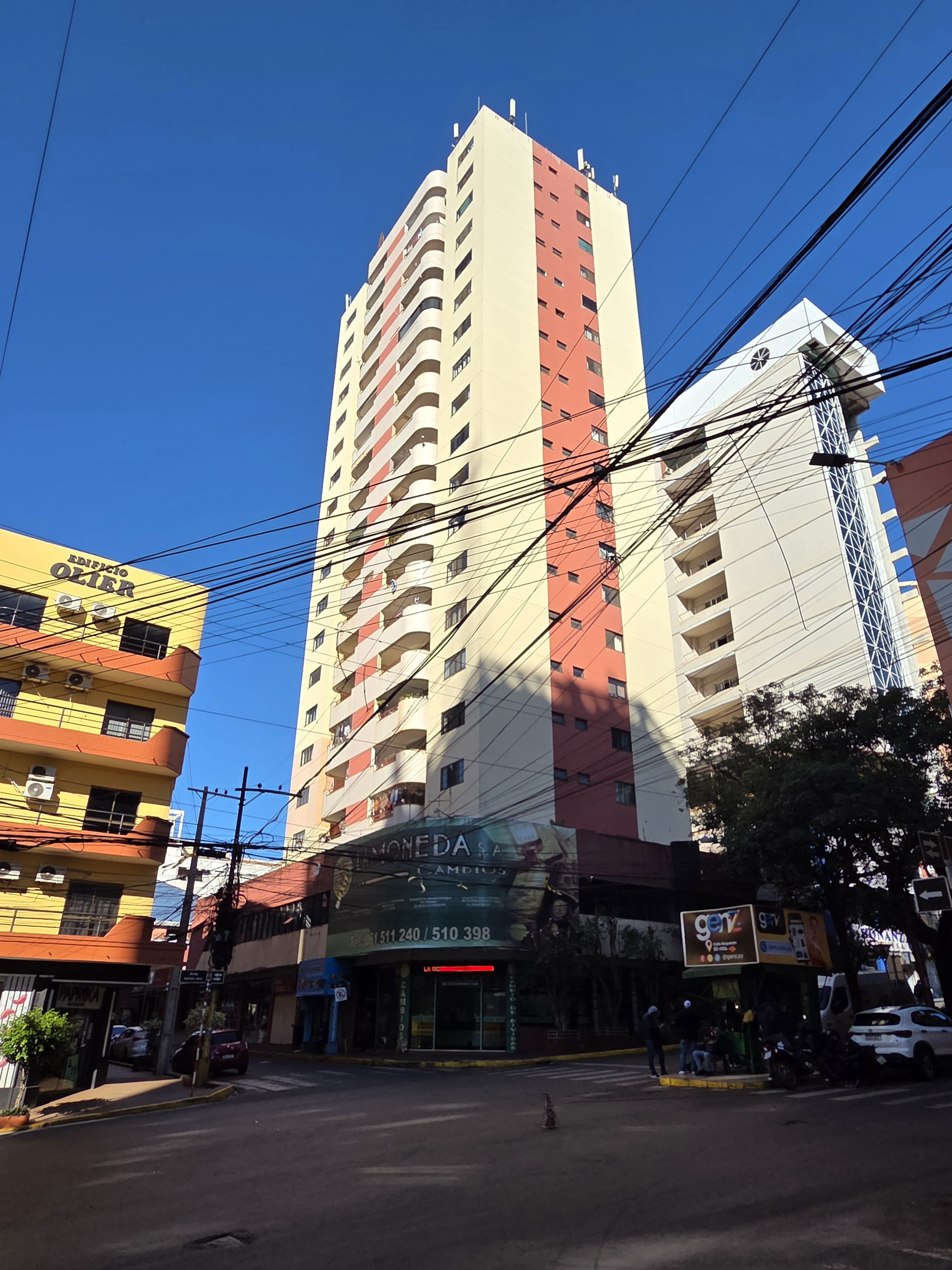
Building hosting the Consulate-General of Argentina

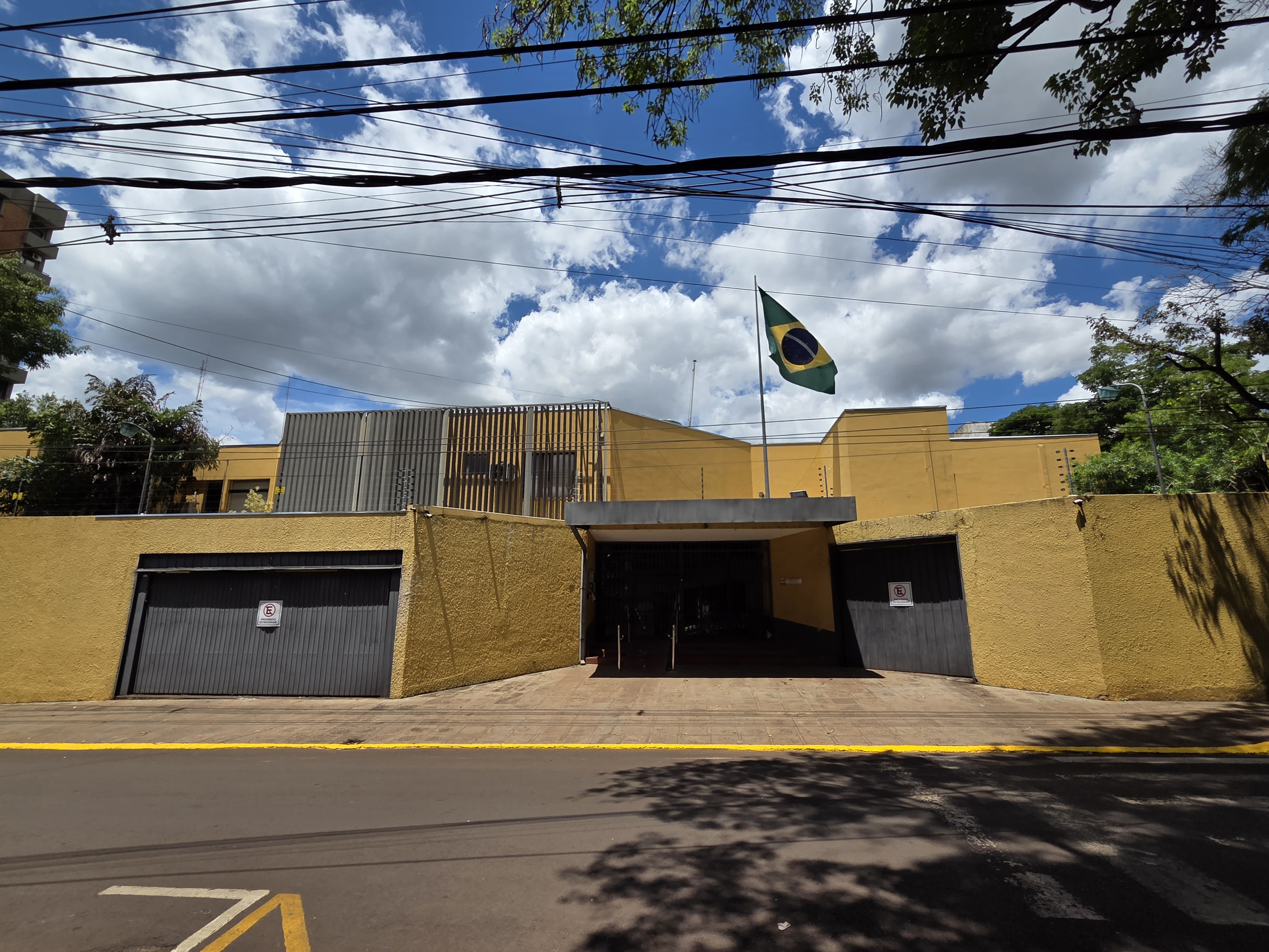
Consulate-General of Brazil

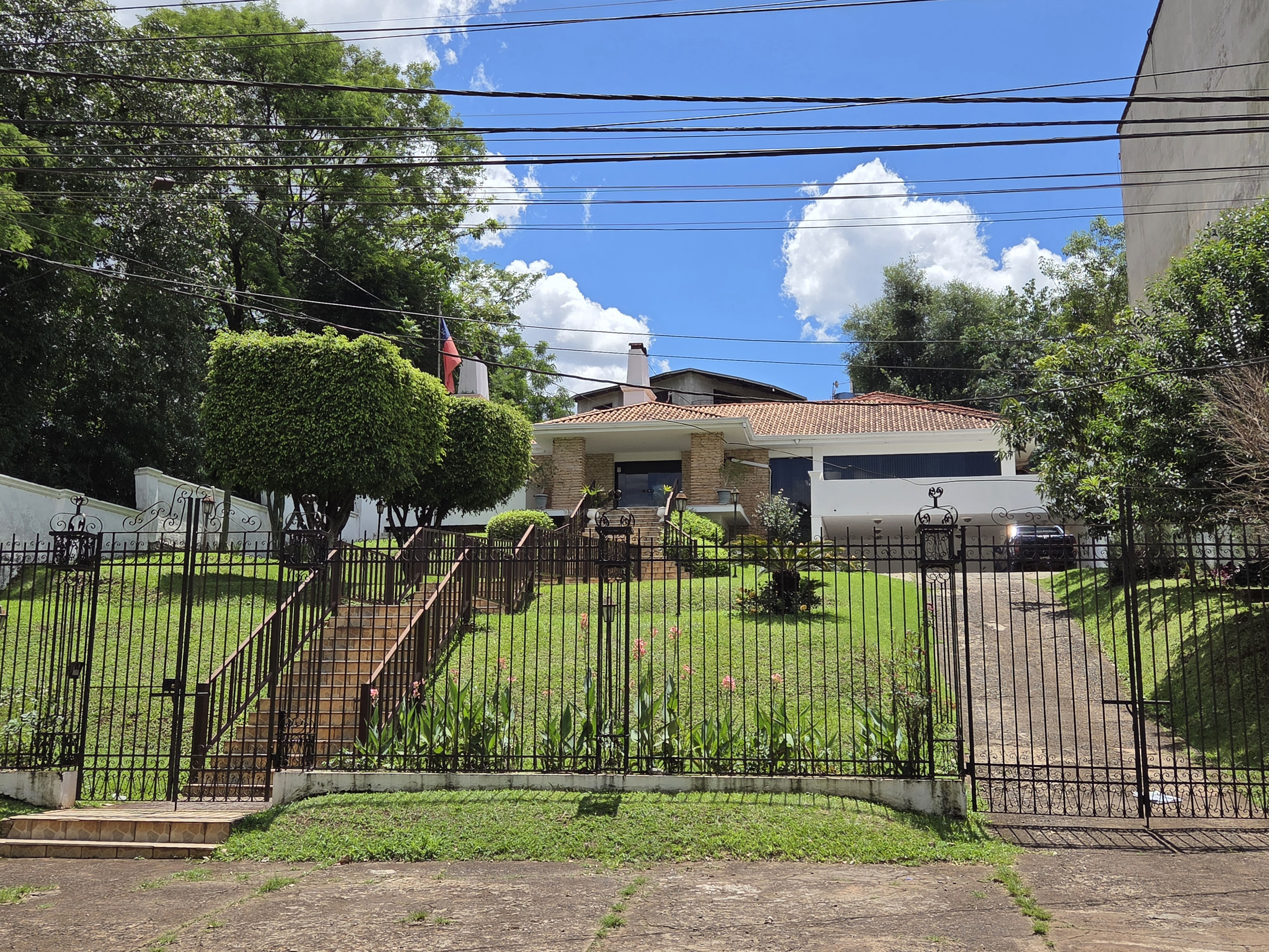
Consulate-General of China (ROC)

=== Concepción ===
- Brazil (Vice-Consulate)

=== Encarnación ===
- Argentina (Consulate-General)
- Brazil (Vice-Consulate)
- Japan (Consular office)

=== Pedro Juan Caballero ===
- Brazil (Consulate)

=== Saltos del Guairá ===
- Brazil (Consulate)
Consulate of Brazil

== Non-resident embassies accredited to Paraguay ==
=== Resident in Buenos Aires, Argentina ===
1. Algeria
2. Angola
3. Australia
4. Austria
5. Azerbaijan
6. Belgium
7. Bulgaria
8. Canada
9. Croatia
10. Czech Republic
11. El Salvador
12. Finland
13. Georgia
14. Guatemala
15. Honduras
16. Hungary
17. Indonesia
18. Ireland
19. Kuwait
20. Malaysia
21. Netherlands
22. New Zealand
23. Norway
24. Philippines
25. Poland
26. Portugal
27. Romania
28. Saudi Arabia
29. Serbia
30. Slovakia
31. Slovenia
32. South Africa
33. Syria
34. Sweden
35. Thailand
36. Ukraine
37. Vietnam

=== Resident in Brasília, Brazil ===
1. Albania
2. Bahrain
3. Bangladesh
4. Barbados
5. Belarus
6. Benin
7. Botswana
8. Burkina Faso
9. Cambodia
10. Cameroon
11. Congo-Brazzaville
12. Cyprus
13. Denmark
14. Equatorial Guinea
15. Ghana
16. Guinea
17. Guinea Bissau
18. Guyana
19. Ivory Coast
20. Jordan
21. Kenya
22. Mali
23. Mauritania
24. Mozambique
25. Namibia
26. Nepal
27. Nigeria
28. Oman
29. Palestine
30. Senegal
31. Sri Lanka
32. Sudan
33. Suriname
34. Trinidad and Tobago
35. Zambia
36. Zimbabwe

=== Resident in Montevideo, Uruguay ===
1. Armenia
2. Egypt
3. Greece
4. Iran
5. Switzerland

=== Resident in Washington, D.C., United States ===
1. Eswatini
2. Fiji
3. Saint Kitts and Nevis
4. Uganda

=== Resident in other cities ===
1. Iceland (Reykjavík)
2. Nicaragua (Santiago)
3. San Marino (Geneva)

== Closed missions ==
Host city	Sending country	Mission	Year closed	Ref.
Asunción	Guatemala	Embassy	2020	
Asunción	Switzerland	Embassy	2016	
Asunción	Venezuela	Embassy	2025	

== See also ==
- List of diplomatic missions of Paraguay
- Foreign relations of Paraguay
