= Paraguayans in Spain =

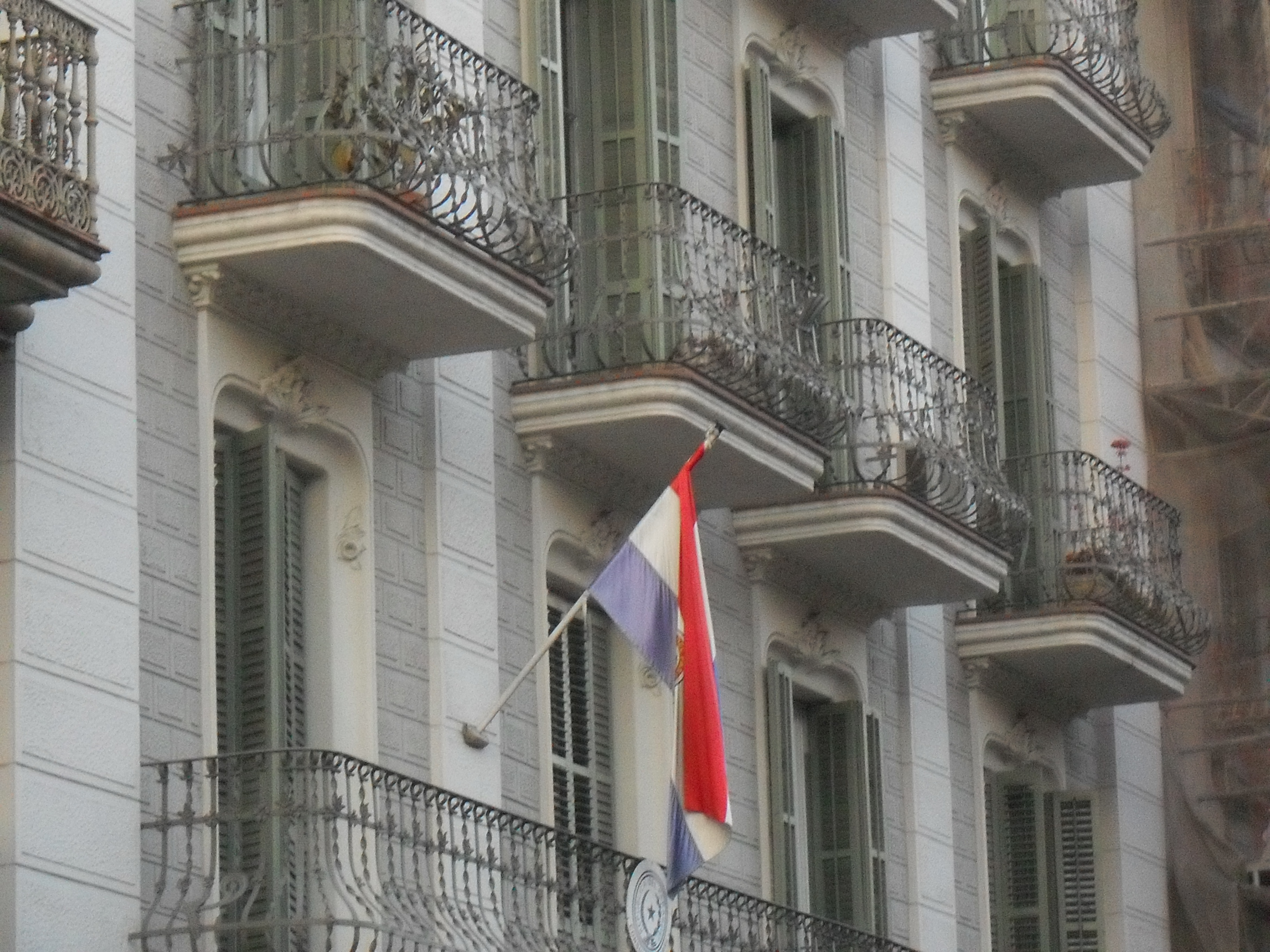
Paraguayan flag at the country's Consulate-General, in Barcelona.

Paraguayans in Spain are the people born in Paraguay who emigrated to Spain. As of 2025, there were 162.633 Paraguayans living in Spain.

== See also ==
- Paraguay–Spain relations
