= Paraguay–Turkey relations =

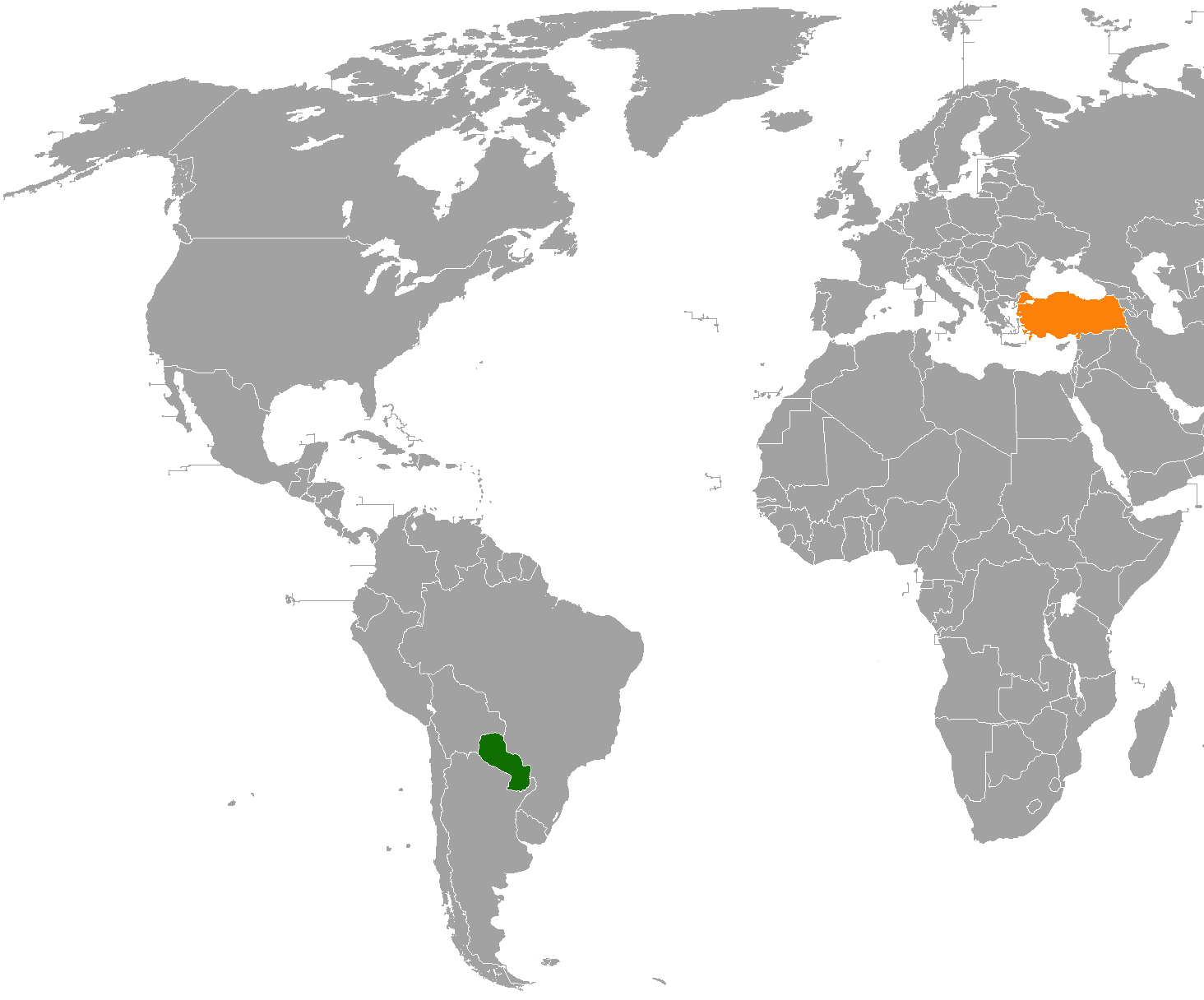

- Paraguay: Turkey

Paraguay–Turkey relations are the bilateral relations between Paraguay and Turkey. The Turkish embassy in Asunción and Paraguayan embassy in Ankara were opened in November 2018 and in February 2019 respectively.

== Presidential visits ==
Guest	Host	Place of visit	Date of visit
(Turkey) President Recep Tayyip Erdoğan	(Paraguay) President Mario Abdo Benítez	Palacio de los López, Asunción	December 2, 2018

== Economic relations ==
Trade volume between the two countries was US$82.1 million in 2019 (Turkish exports/imports: US$47.1/35 million).

Main exports of Paraguay are: soybeans, cotton, oil seeds and oleaginous fruits, charcoal, broad beans, beans, seeds, bran, and other residues of the sifting of cereals.

== See also ==
- Foreign relations of Paraguay
- Foreign relations of Turkey
