= Paraguay–United Kingdom relations =

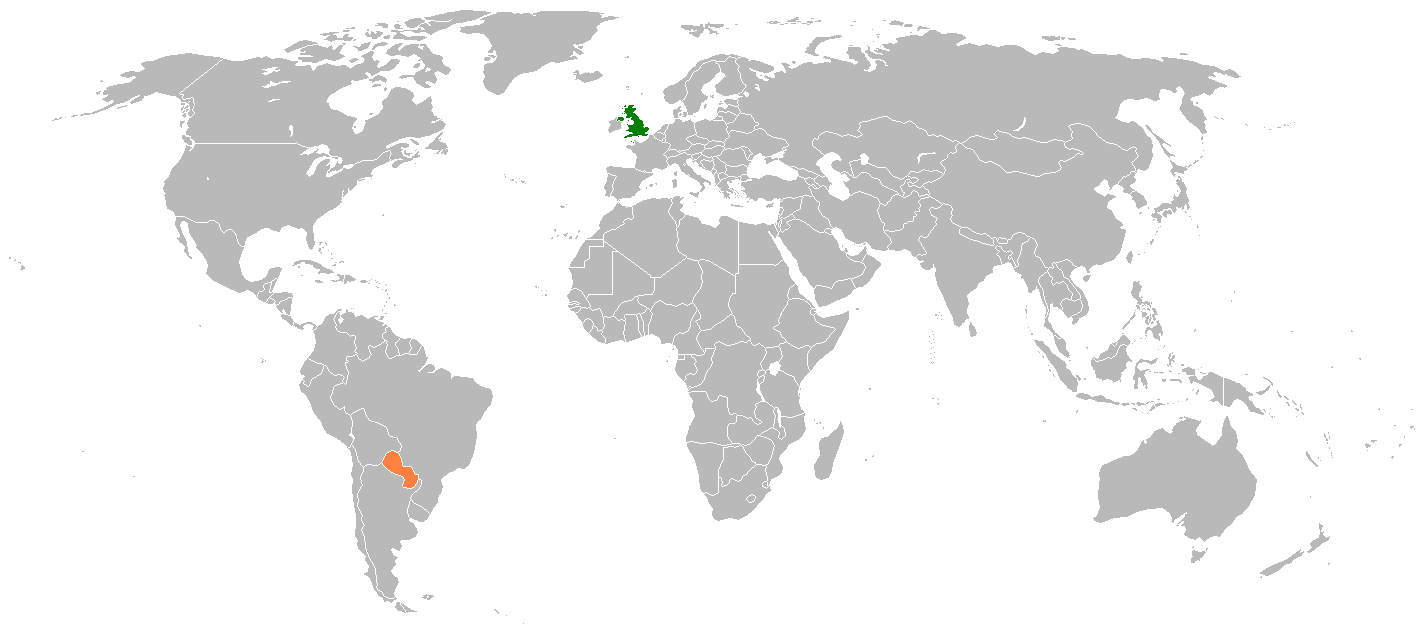

- Paraguay: United Kingdom

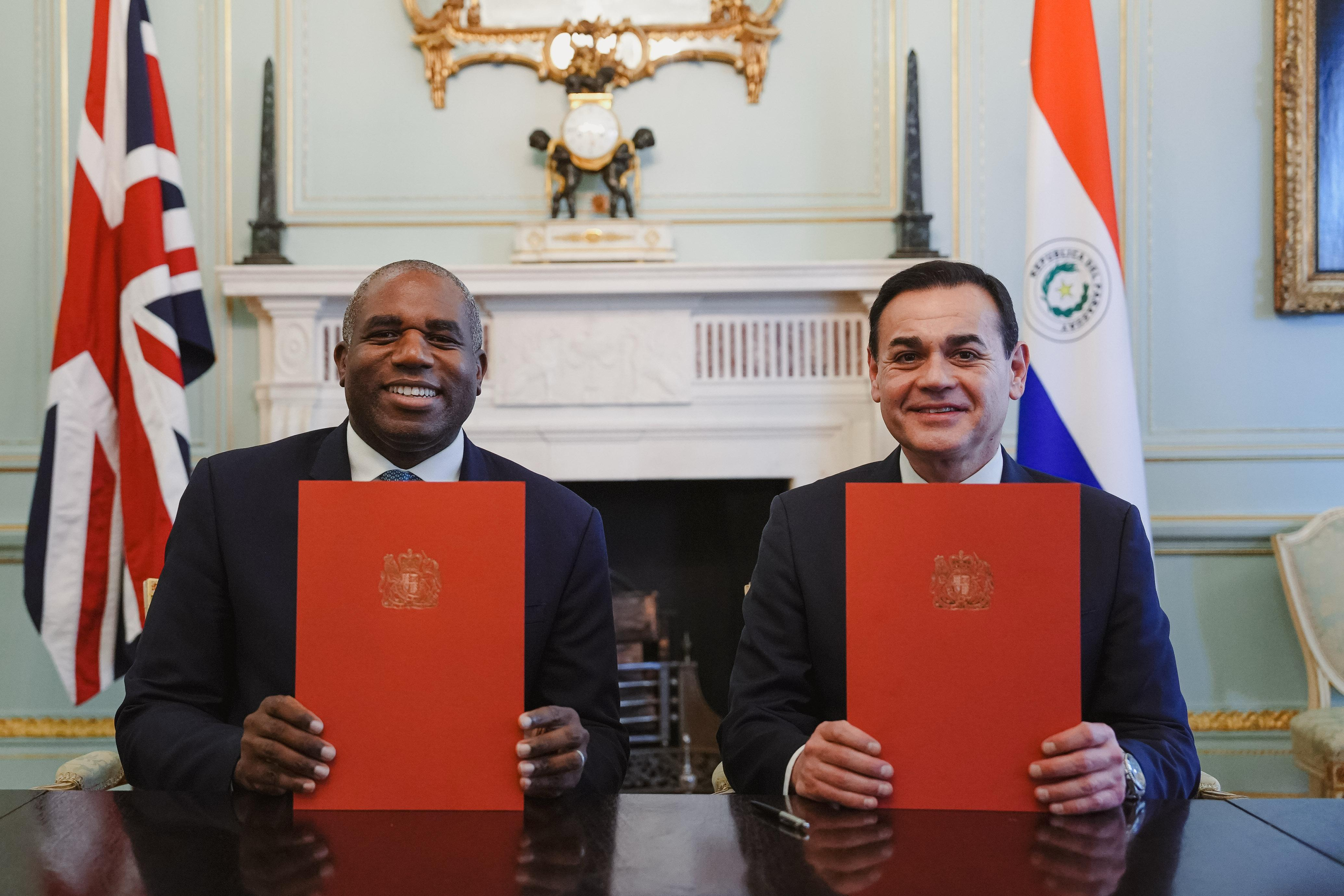
British Foreign Secretary David Lammy with Paraguayan Foreign Minister Rubén Ramírez Lezcano in London, July 2025.

Paraguay–United Kingdom relations encompass the diplomatic, economic, and historical interactions between the Republic of Paraguay and the United Kingdom of Great Britain and Northern Ireland. The two countries established diplomatic relations on 4 March 1853.

Both countries share common membership of the International Criminal Court, the United Nations, the World Health Organization, and the World Trade Organization. Bilaterally the two countries have an Investment Agreement.

== Resident diplomatic missions ==
- Paraguay maintains an embassy in London.
- The United Kingdom is accredited to Paraguay through its embassy in Asunción.

== See also ==
- English people in Paraguay
- Foreign relations of Paraguay
- Foreign relations of the United Kingdom
