= English people in Paraguay =

English people in Paraguay Anglo-paraguayos
Total population
- N/A

Regions with significant populations
- Asunción, Itapúa, Paraguarí, Boquerón Department, Alto Paraguay.

Languages
- Paraguayan Spanish. Minority speaks English and Paraguayan Guaraní as first language.

Religion
- Roman Catholicism, Protestantism (Episcopalianism, Methodism, Presbyterianism et al.)

Related ethnic groups
- English, Anglo-Argentine, English Chilean, English diaspora, English Americans

The English people in Paraguay mostly arrived during the colonial period as investors and industrialists. They were noted throughout the Southern Cone region of Paraguay as being skilled farmers, investors, and bankers and as having created many of the regions railways and settled vast tracts of land. Especially in the region of Sapucái, Paraguarí Department, where it was the first place in Paraguay to have electricity and railways.

In the modern day however it is assumed most have become a part of the wider Paraguayan ethnicity, although there are still some in Paraguay who identify as "English".

Today the English influence in Paraguay is not so far-reaching as it once was, and the English population in the country is a small minority, with many of the former English people of Paraguay becoming absorbed into the local population. Paraguay ranks relatively well at the EF English Proficiency Index (Top 50).

== See also ==
- Immigration to Paraguay
- Paraguay–United Kingdom relations
