= Paraguay–Russia relations =

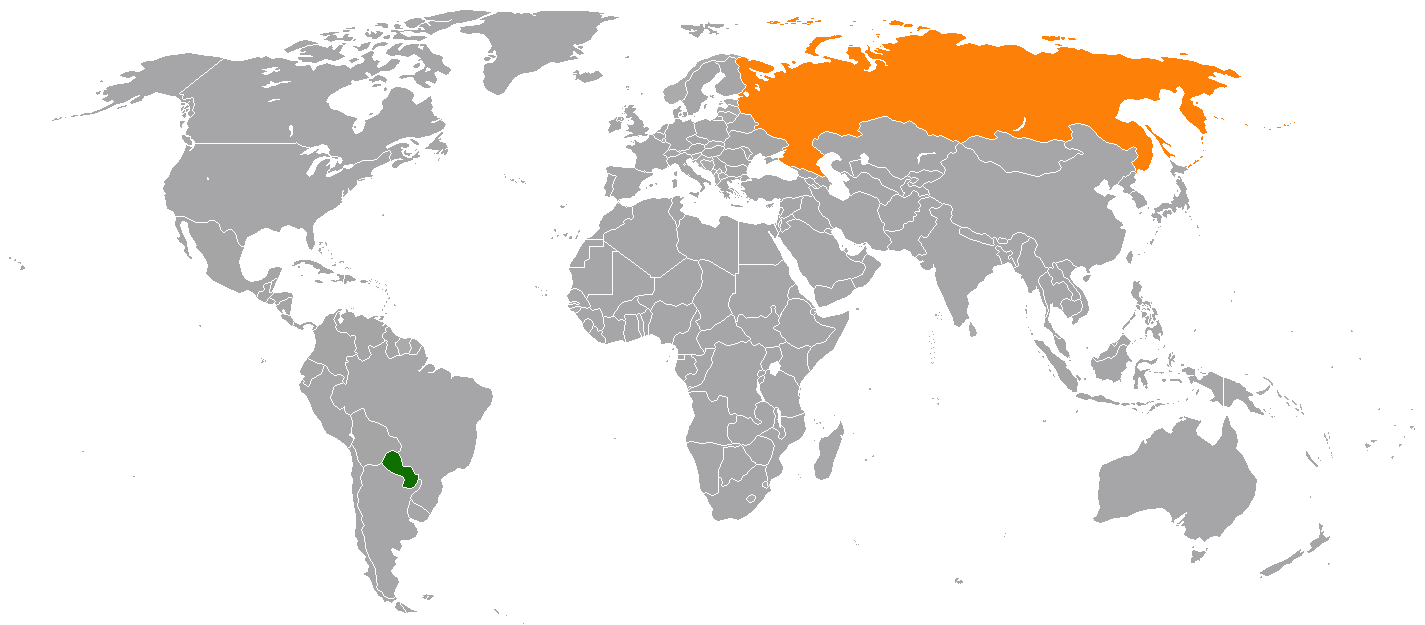

- Paraguay: Russia

Paraguay–Russia relations are foreign relations between Paraguay and Russia. Both countries established diplomatic relations on May 14, 1992. Paraguay has an embassy in Moscow, which is concurrently accredited to Armenia, Azerbaijan, Belarus, Kazakhstan, Tajikistan and Uzbekistan. Russia has an embassy in Asunción.

== Russian Federation relations ==
Paraguay and the Russian Federation established diplomatic relations on 14 May 1992. Russia has an embassy in Asunción, and Paraguay has a mission in Moscow.

On 13 September 2007, Russia's foreign minister, Sergei Lavrov visited Paraguay and announced that Russia would open an embassy in Asunción.

== Resident diplomatic missions ==
- Paraguay has an embassy in Moscow.
- Russia has an embassy in Asunción.

== Notes ==
- The Embassy of Paraguay in Moscow is accredited to Armenia, Belarus, Kazakhstan, Kyrgyzstan, Tajikistan, Turkmenistan and Uzbekistan.

== See also ==
- Foreign relations of Paraguay
- Foreign relations of Russia
- List of ambassadors of Russia to Paraguay
