= Paraguay–Uruguay relations =

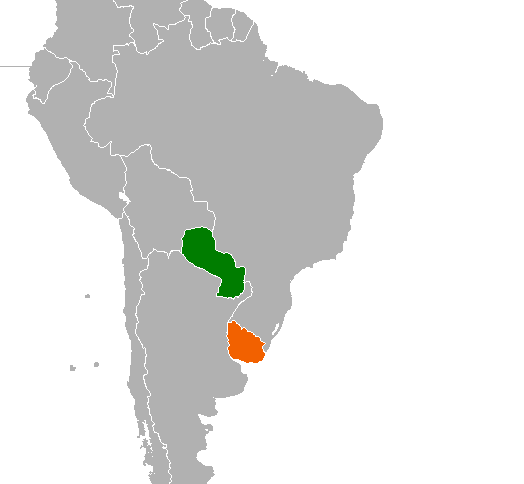

- Paraguay: Uruguay

Paraguay and Uruguay established diplomatic relations on April 6, 1845. Paraguay has an embassy and a consulate-general in Montevideo. Uruguay has an embassy and a consulate-general in Asunción. Paraguay also has an honorary consulate in Punta del Este. Both countries were founding members of the Mercosur, and both are full members of the Rio Group, the Latin Union, the Association of Spanish Language Academies, the Organization of American States, the Organization of Ibero-American States, the Union of South American Nations, the URUPABOL, the Cairns Group and the Group of 77.

== Overview ==
José Gervasio Artigas, the most celebrated historical figure in Uruguay, spent his last 30 life years exiled in Paraguay. In the 1920s a school was opened at Artigas' house in Paraguay.

During the War of the Triple Alliance, in which Uruguay was the smallest member of the coalition at war with Paraguay, soldiers of both countries fought each other in the major battles of Jataí, Tuyutí and Curupaity.

Uruguay is a small country, with wide beaches on the Atlantic Ocean, so many well-off Paraguayans choose Uruguay as their usual holiday destination, some of them even as permanent residence. Other Paraguayans of a lower social condition come to Uruguay in search of job opportunities, as part of a big inflow of Latin Americans entering Uruguay.

The 2011 Uruguayan census revealed 1,781 people who declared Paraguay as their country of birth. As of 2013, there are some 150 Paraguayan citizens registered in the Uruguayan social security. As of 2007, there were over 1,000 Uruguayans living on Paraguayan territory, a figure that notably increased a decade later.

Paraguayan residents in Uruguay have their own social and cultural association. Uruguayan residents in Paraguay have their own institutions, for instance, the Consultative Council "José Gervasio Artigas" in Asunción.

== Economic relations ==
As of 2014, bilateral trade is prosperous and improving. In the decade of the 2010s there have been several Uruguayan investors purchasing productive land in Paraguay.In 2020, bilateral trade between Paraguay and Uruguay totaled $222 million, resulting in a trade deficit of $10.3 million for Paraguay. During this period, Paraguayan exports to Uruguay reached $106 million, while imports from Uruguay totaled $116 million. In 2024, bilateral trade between Paraguay and Uruguay totaled $296 million, resulting in a trade surplus of $40.3 million for Paraguay. Paraguayan exports to Uruguay reached $168 million, primarily consisting of agricultural commodities such as corn ($21.6 million), bovine meat ($18.9 million), and soybeans ($14.2 million), reflecting an annualized export growth rate of 9.86% since 2019. Conversely, Uruguayan exports to Paraguay amounted to $128 million, led by malt ($20.5 million), pesticides ($14.9 million), and packaged medicaments ($12.4 million), representing a slight annualized decline of 0.53% over the same five-year period.

== See also ==
- Foreign relations of Paraguay
- Foreign relations of Uruguay
