= Paraguay–Spain relations =

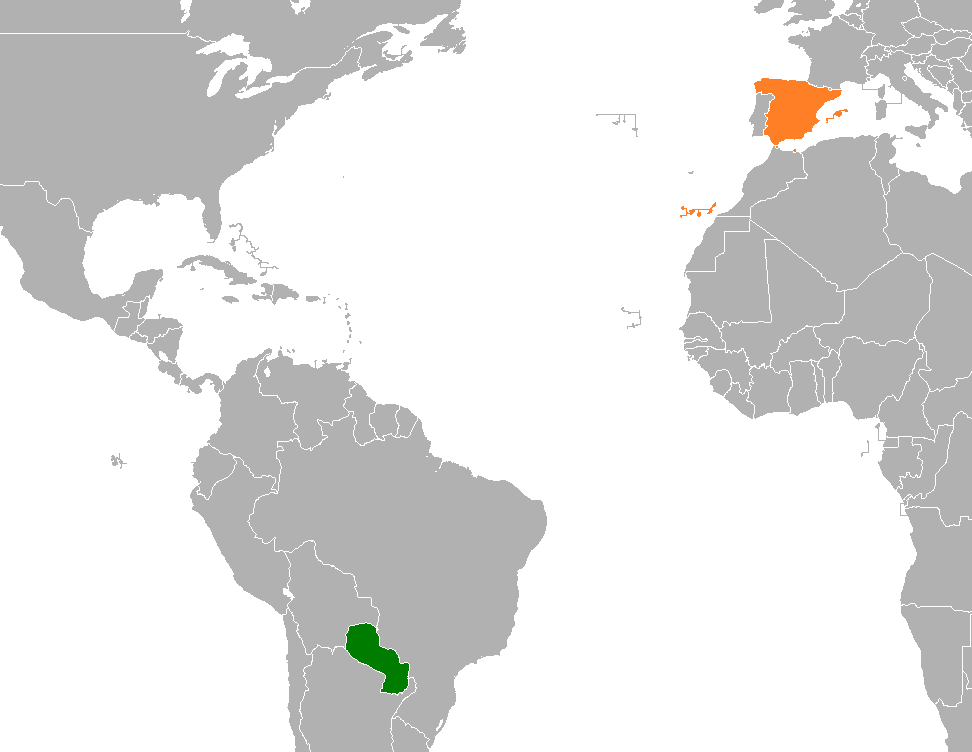

- Paraguay: Spain

Diplomatic mission
- Embassy of Paraguay, Madrid: Embassy of Spain, Asunción

The Republic of Paraguay and the Kingdom of Spain have maintained current and historical relations. Both nations are members of the Association of Spanish Language Academies and the Organization of Ibero-American States.

== History ==
=== Spanish colonization ===
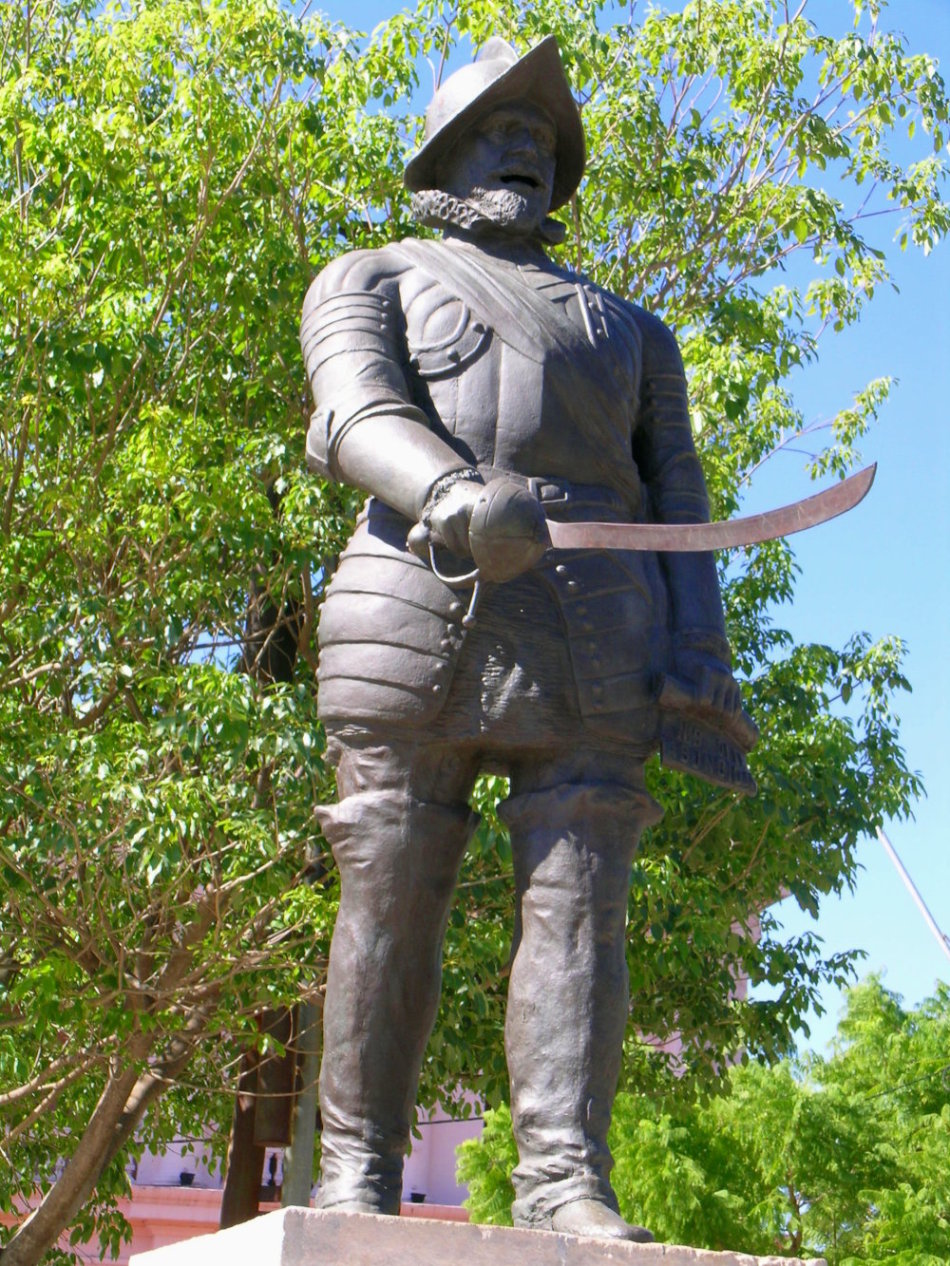
Statue of Spanish conquistador Juan de Salazar de Espinosa, the founder of Asunción

In 1524, Aleixo Garcia, a Portuguese explorer in the service of Spain arrived to present-day Paraguay. In 1536, the first Spanish settlements in Paraguay were established by Domingo Martínez de Irala in the Asunción region and initially, Spanish settlers lived in peace among the Guaraní people. In 1542, Paraguay officially became part of the Spanish Empire and governed by the newly created Viceroyalty of Peru based in Lima.

In the early 1600s, Jesuit missionaries began arriving to Paraguay and established missions to convert the local Guaraní people to Catholicism. This period was known as the Jesuit reduction. For the next 150 years, Jesuits developed their own autonomous area of control within Paraguay which led to conflict with the Spanish administration of the colony. From 1721 to 1735, Spanish landowners waged a struggle to overthrow the Jesuit monopoly of Indian trade and labor. Spanish and Portuguese troops joined together to overthrow the Jesuit dominance in the region which resulted in the Jesuits being expelled from Paraguay and nearby colonies in 1767.

=== Independence ===
In 1776, the Viceroyalty of the Río de la Plata was created based in Buenos Aires and Paraguay fell under its new administration. By the early 1800s, a sense of independence was spreading throughout Spanish America. In May 1810, the May Revolution occurred in Buenos Aires which began the Argentine War of Independence. Because Paraguay fell under the governance of Buenos Aires, the act of independence in Argentina affected Paraguay although leaders in Paraguay refused to accept the declaration of Argentine Independence.

Although initially Paraguay was against independence from Spain, in May 1811 a Junta was created in Asuncion led by Fulgencio Yegros. The Junta declared Paraguayan independence and in July 1811, they sent a letter to Buenos Aires expressing their desire of a confederation with Argentina, however, by October 1812, the confederation was disbanded after Argentina made its intentions to use Paraguayan troops for its own independence and interprovincial quarrels. In October 1812 Paraguay declared itself an independent republic.

=== Post independence ===
On 10 September 1880, both Paraguay and Spain signed a Treaty of Peace and Friendship thus officially establishing diplomatic relations between both nations. During the Spanish Civil War (1936-1939), eight Paraguayan nationals (known as Miliciano guaraní) fought in the war as part of the International Brigades for the Republican faction and they fought in the Battle of the Ebro.

Paraguay maintained diplomatic relations throughout General Francisco Franco’s administration. Relations between Paraguay and Spain strengthened under the Presidency of Alfredo Stroessner. In July 1973, President Stroessner paid an official visit to Spain and met with General Franco.

In October 1990, Spanish King Juan Carlos I paid his first official visit to Paraguay. The King would visit Paraguay again in 2006 and once more in 2011 to attend the Ibero-American Summit being held in the Paraguayan capital. In June 2015, Paraguayan President Horacio Cartes paid an official visit to Spain.

== High-level visits ==
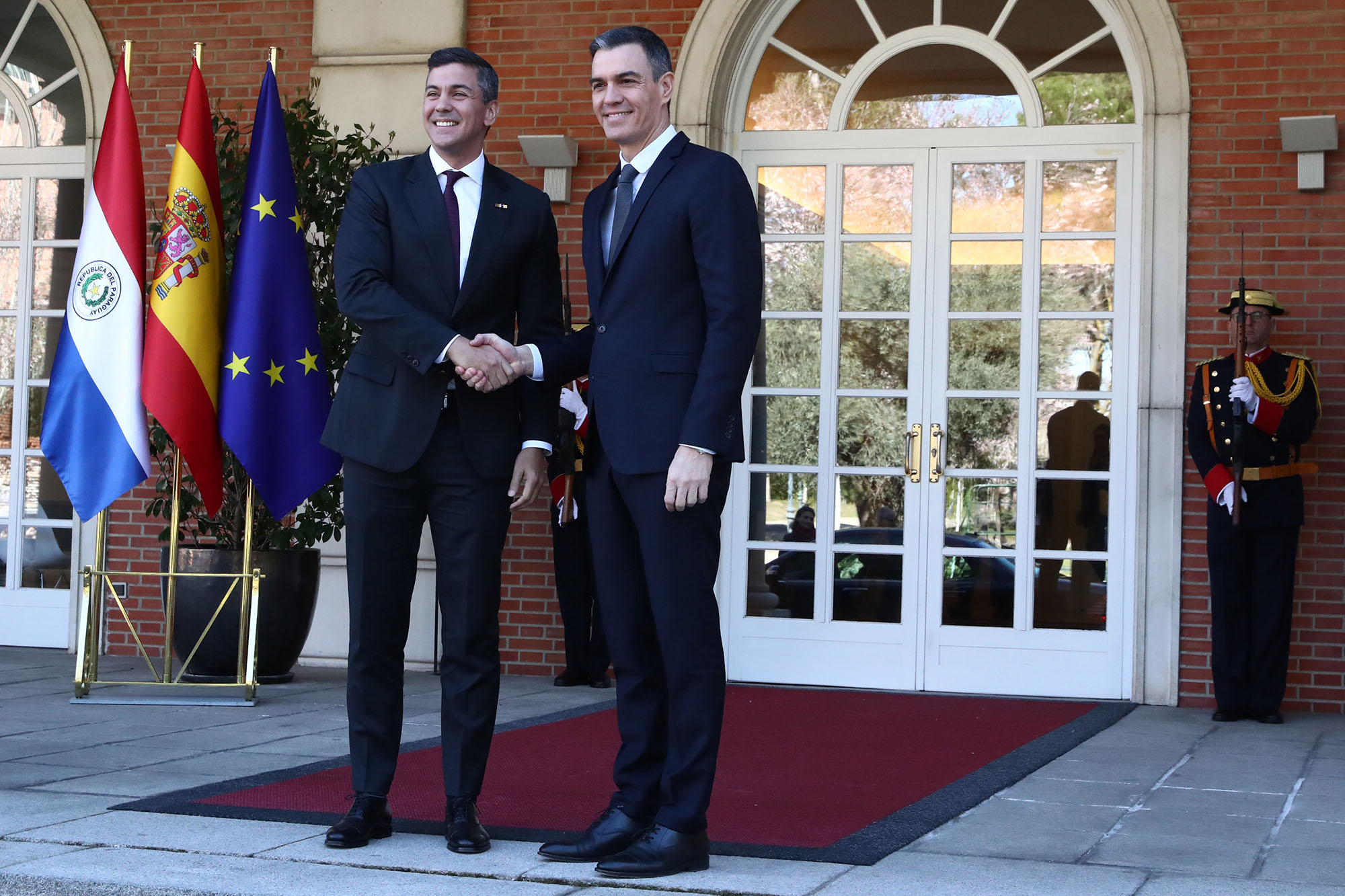
Paraguayan President Santiago Peña with Spanish Prime Minister Pedro Sánchez in the Moncloa Palace in Madrid, February 2024.

Presidential visits from Paraguay to Spain

- President Alfredo Stroessner (1973)
- President Andrés Rodríguez Pedotti (1992)
- President Juan Carlos Wasmosy (1994)
- President Luis González Macchi (2000)
- President Nicanor Duarte Frutos (2005)
- President Fernando Lugo (2010)
- President Federico Franco (2013)
- President Horacio Cartes (2015)
- President Mario Abdo Benítez (2022)
- President Santiago Peña (2024)

Royal and Prime Ministerial visits from Spain to Paraguay

- King Juan Carlos I (1990, 2006, 2011)
- Prime Minister Felipe González (1994)
- Prime Minister José María Aznar (1999)
- Prime Minister José Luis Rodríguez Zapatero (2011)
- King Felipe VI (2023)
- Prime Minister Pedro Sánchez (2025)

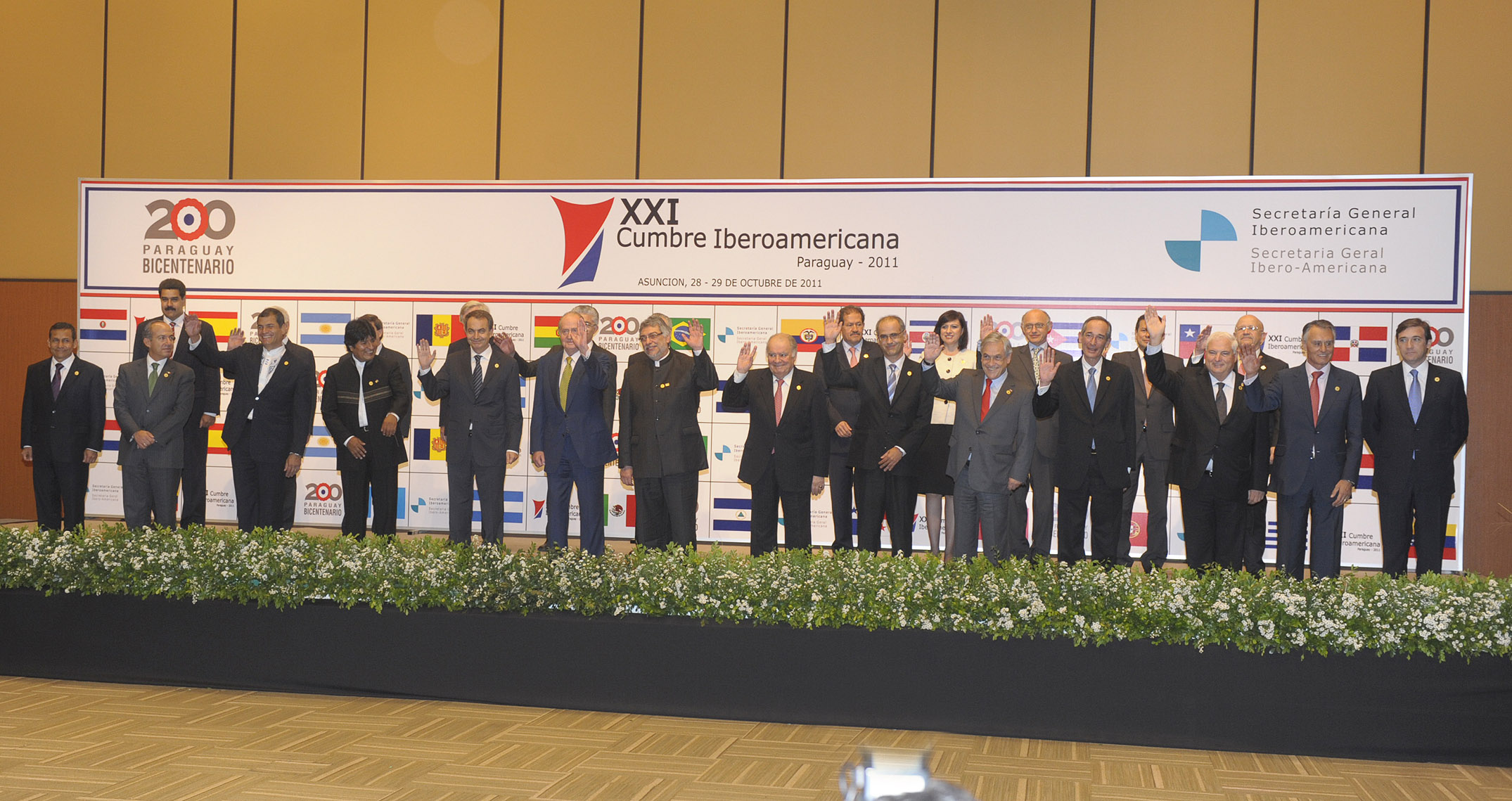
President Fernando Lugo along with King Juan Carlos I and Prime Minister José Luis Rodríguez Zapatero in Asunción; 2011.

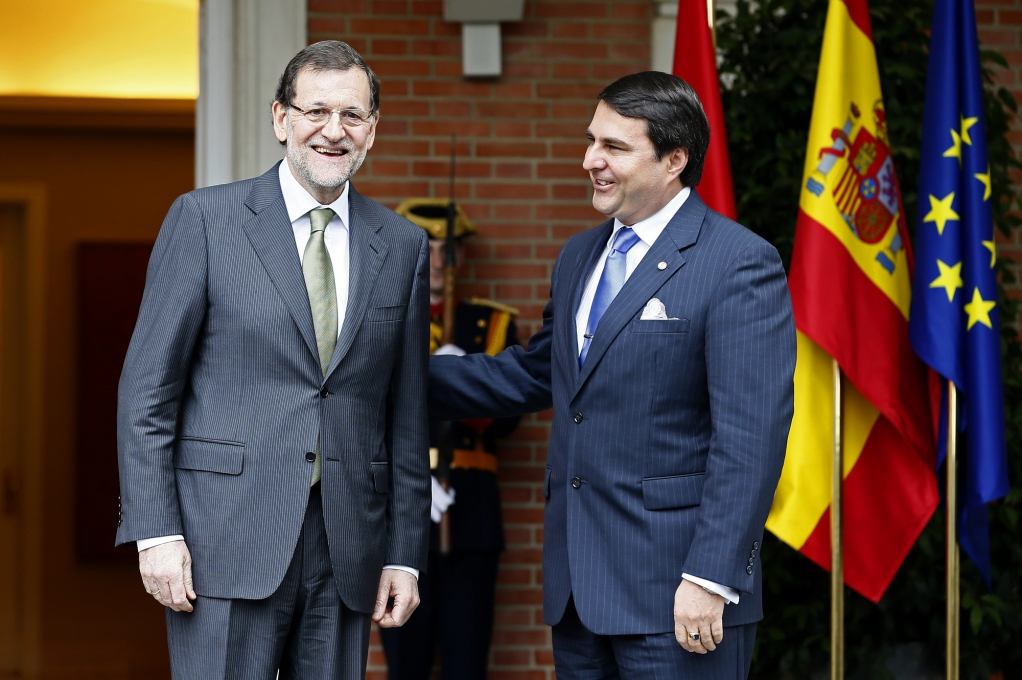
Prime Minister Mariano Rajoy and President Federico Franco in Madrid; 2013.

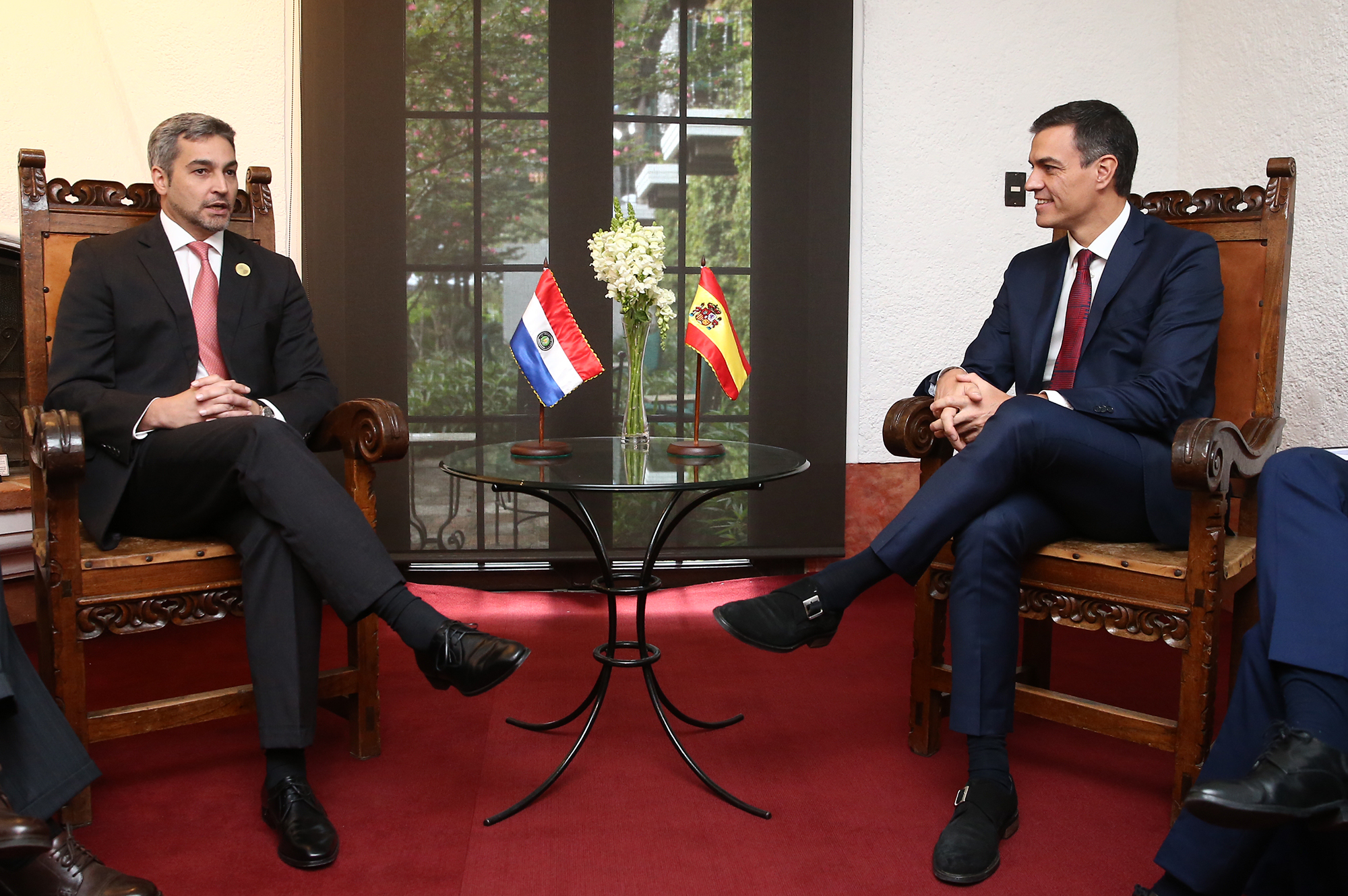
President Mario Abdo Benítez and Prime Minister Pedro Sánchez in Antigua, Guatemala; 2018.

== Bilateral relations ==
Over the years, several agreements and treaties have been signed by both nations such as an Agreement on the Exchange of Diplomatic Packages (1925); Agreement on Cultural Exchanges (1958); Agreement on Dual-Citizenship (1959); Agreement on the Elimination of Visa Requirements (1959); Agreement on Economic Cooperation (1971); Agreement on Air Transportation (1976); Agreement on the Promotion and Protection of Investments (1993); Extradition Treaty (1998); Agreement on the participation of citizens who legally reside in either Paraguay or Spain to participate in local elections (2009) and an Agreement on Cyber security Cooperation (2015).

== Transportation ==
There are direct, non-stop flights between both nations with Air Europa since 2011.

== Trade ==
In 2024, trade between Paraguay and Spain totaled €155 million Euros. Paraguay's main exports to Spain include: vegetable oil, wood, perfumes, tobacco and furniture. Spain's main exports to Paraguay include: perfume, machinery, paper, automobile and trucks, electrical equipment and airplanes. That same year, Spain had US$29 million worth of investments in Paraguay. Spanish multinational companies such as Banco Bilbao Vizcaya Argentaria and Mapfre operate in Paraguay.

== Resident diplomatic missions ==
of Paraguay in Spain

- Madrid (Embassy)
- Madrid (Consulate-General)
- Barcelona (Consulate-General)
- Málaga (Consulate-General)

of Spain in Paraguay

- Asunción (Embassy)

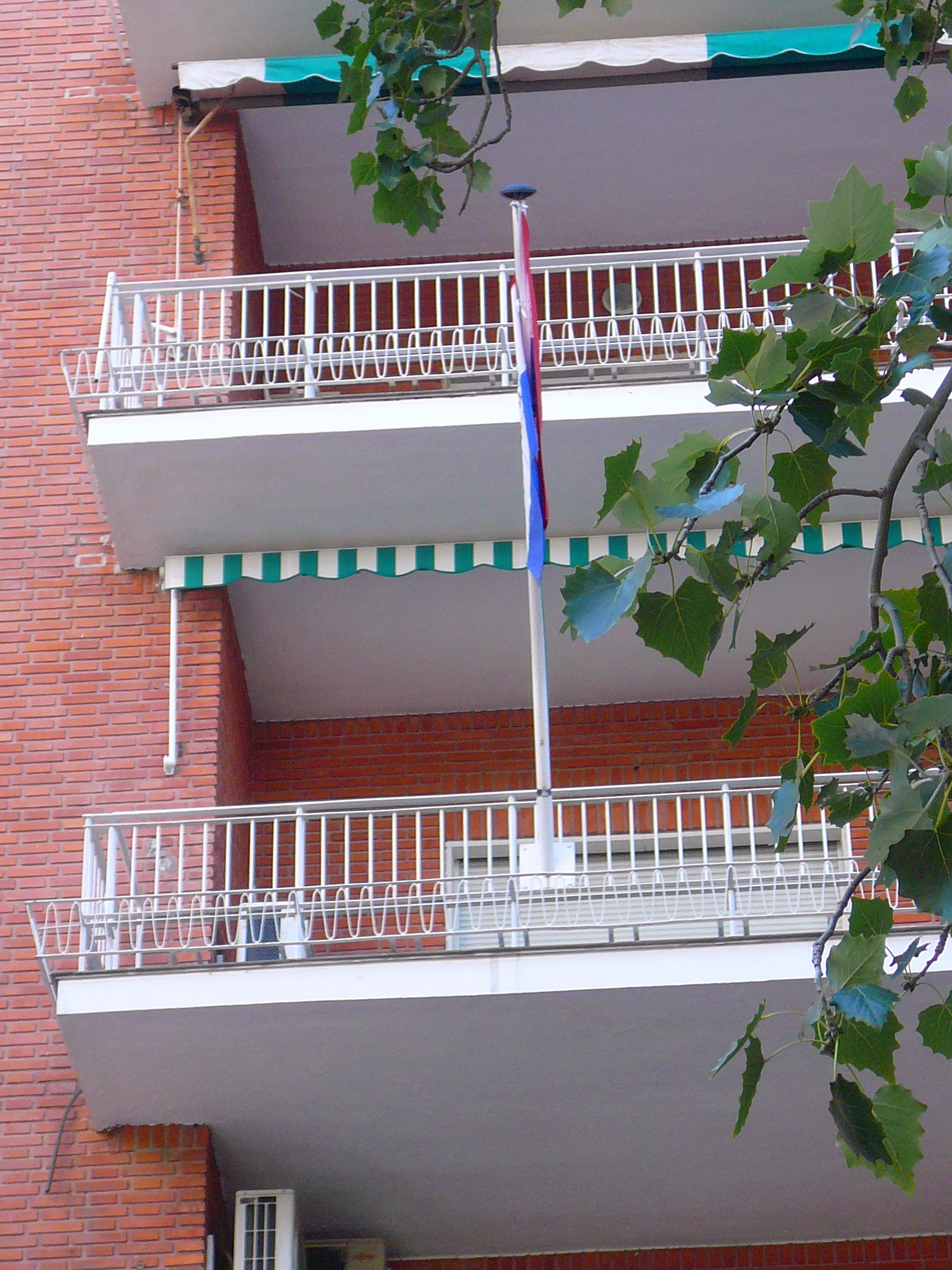
Embassy of Paraguay in Madrid

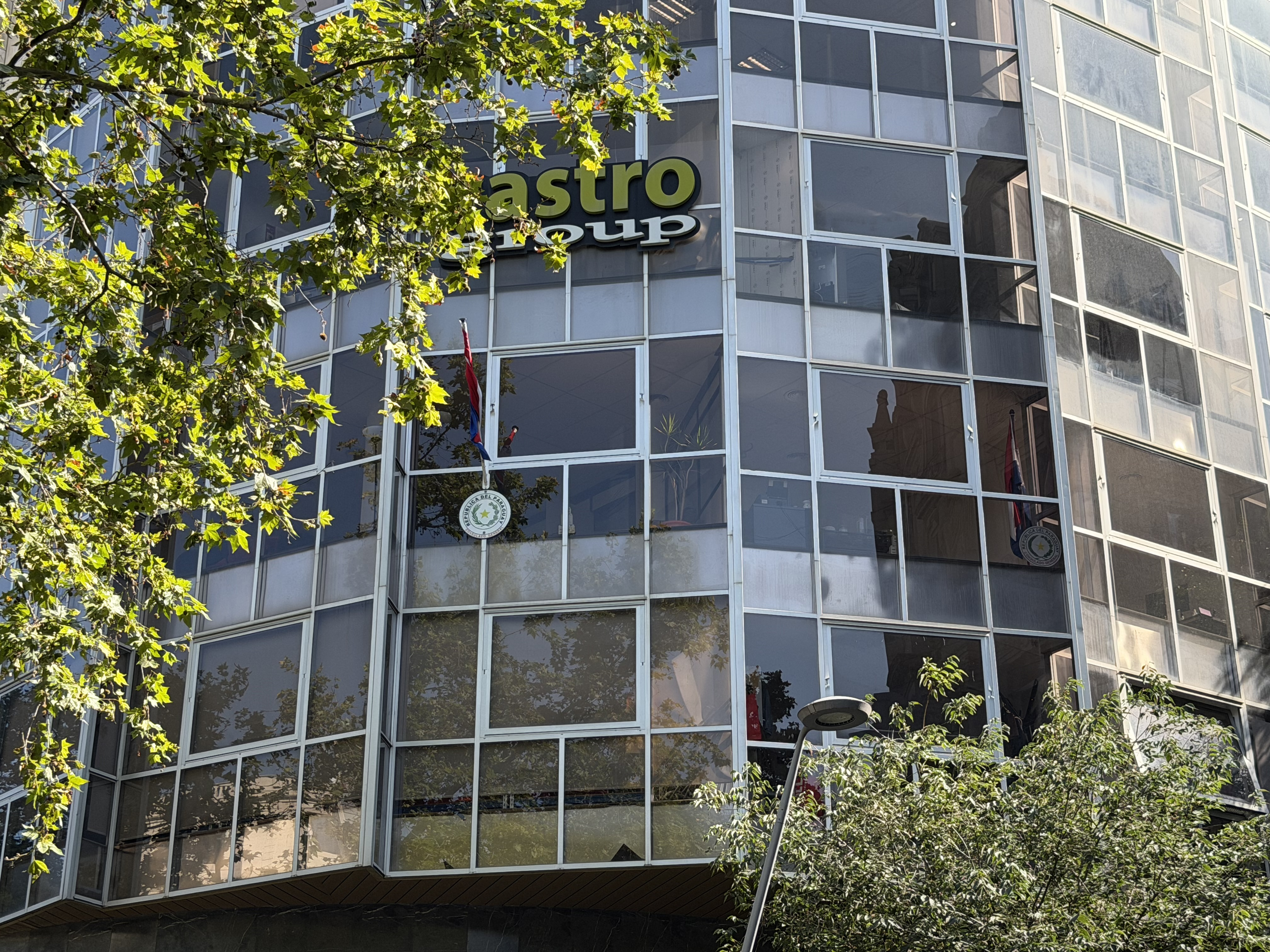
Consulate-General of Paraguay in Barcelona

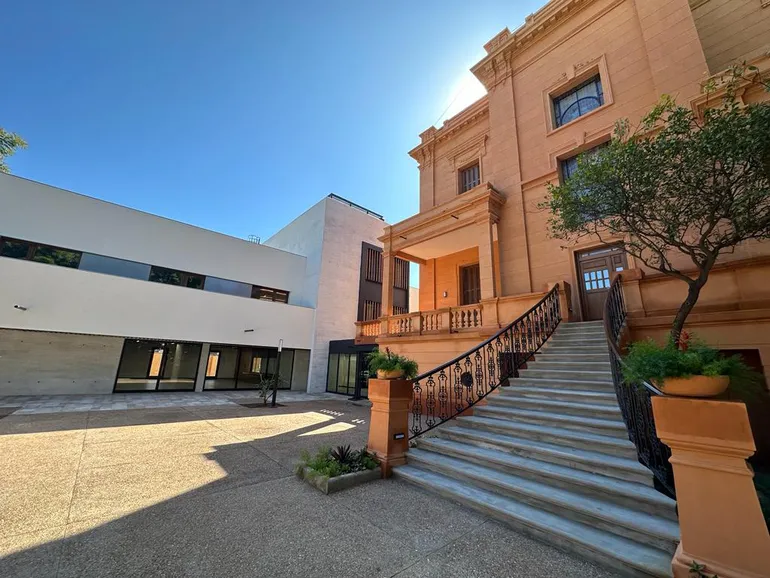
Embassy of Spain in Asunción

== See also ==
- Paraguayans in Spain
