= Montenegrin Paraguayans =

Montenegrin Paraguayans Crnogorski Paragvajci Црногорски Парагвајци
Total population
- 2,000 (2018)

Regions with significant populations
- Asunción

Languages
- Spanish, Guarani, Montenegrin

Montenegrin Paraguayans (Montenegrin: Crnogorski Paragvajci) are Paraguayan citizens of Montenegrin descent.

Around 2,000 Montenegrin Paraguayans live in Paraguay. In 2018, a Matica, a formal cultural organization, was established to connect the Montenegrin Paraguayan diaspora to Montenegro. Montenegrins began to emigrate to Paraguay in the early 19th century, with many settling in urban areas.

== History ==
From the early 19th century onwards, Montenegrins began to emigrate to Paraguay in search of work. Montenegrins from Bay of Kotor worked as sailors in South America, which led to them settling on the continent. Some Montenegrin sailors participated in the Argentine War of Independence. However, it was in the latter half of the century that more Montenegrins began to emigrate. As of 1889, there were approximately 1,000 Yugoslavs living in Paraguay. Montenegrins in Paraguay primarily settled in urban areas.

After World War 2, some Montenegrin Chetniks fled to Paraguay to avoid being prosecuted for war crimes.

Much of the Montenegrin Paraguayans community are the descendents of immigrants who came to Paraguay prior to 1940. As of 2018, there were approximately 2,000 Montenegrin Paraguayans, some of whom were sitting politicians. Other Montenegrin Paraguayans hold positions such as owning hotel chains or banks.

The Montenegrin Matica in Paraguay was founded in 2018 in Asunción, intended to represent Montenegrin Paraguayans. The Matica is headed by Andres Lakonić and Vanja Selić, both of whom are Montenegrin Paraguayans. The ambassador of Montenegro in Argentina, Gordan Stojović, attended the inauguration of the Matica. The Montenegrin Paraguayans community hoped that a Montenegrin embassy would be established in the country.

Starting that year, a scholarship was established to allow five students in South America to study in Cetinje. They also began an effort to translate to publish one Spanish language book in Montenegro each year.

In 2019, Đukanović visited the Montenegrin community in Paraguay while seeking investments in the country amidst the accession of Montenegro to the European Union.

== Language ==
Most Montenegrin Paraguayans speak Spanish and Guarani. Efforts have been made to revitalize Montenegrin within the community.

== Notable Montenegrin Paraguayans ==
- Branko Vučković, hotel chain owner
- Marta Martinović, descendent of Krsto Popović
- Federik Tomašević, bank owner
- Andres Lakonic, hydroelectric dam owner
