= India–Paraguay relations =

- India: Paraguay

Diplomatic mission
- Embassy of India in Asunción: Embassy of Paraguay in New Delhi

Envoy
- Charge d'affaires Swadha Rizvi: Ambassador Fleming Raúl Duarte

Diplomatic relations between India and Paraguay were established in 1961.

== History ==
Diplomatic relations between India and Paraguay were established on 13 September 1961. Paraguay opened its embassy in India in March 2006. The embassy is jointly accredited to Sri Lanka. Paraguay also maintains Honorary Consulates in Chennai, Kolkata, and Mumbai. Before 2022, India used to be represented in Paraguay through its embassy in Buenos Aires, Argentina, and an Honorary Consulate in Asunción.

In May 2012, Fernando Lugo became the first Paraguayan President to visit India. He was accompanied by the Ministers of Foreign Affairs, Agriculture and Animal Husbandry and Commerce, and other senior government officials.

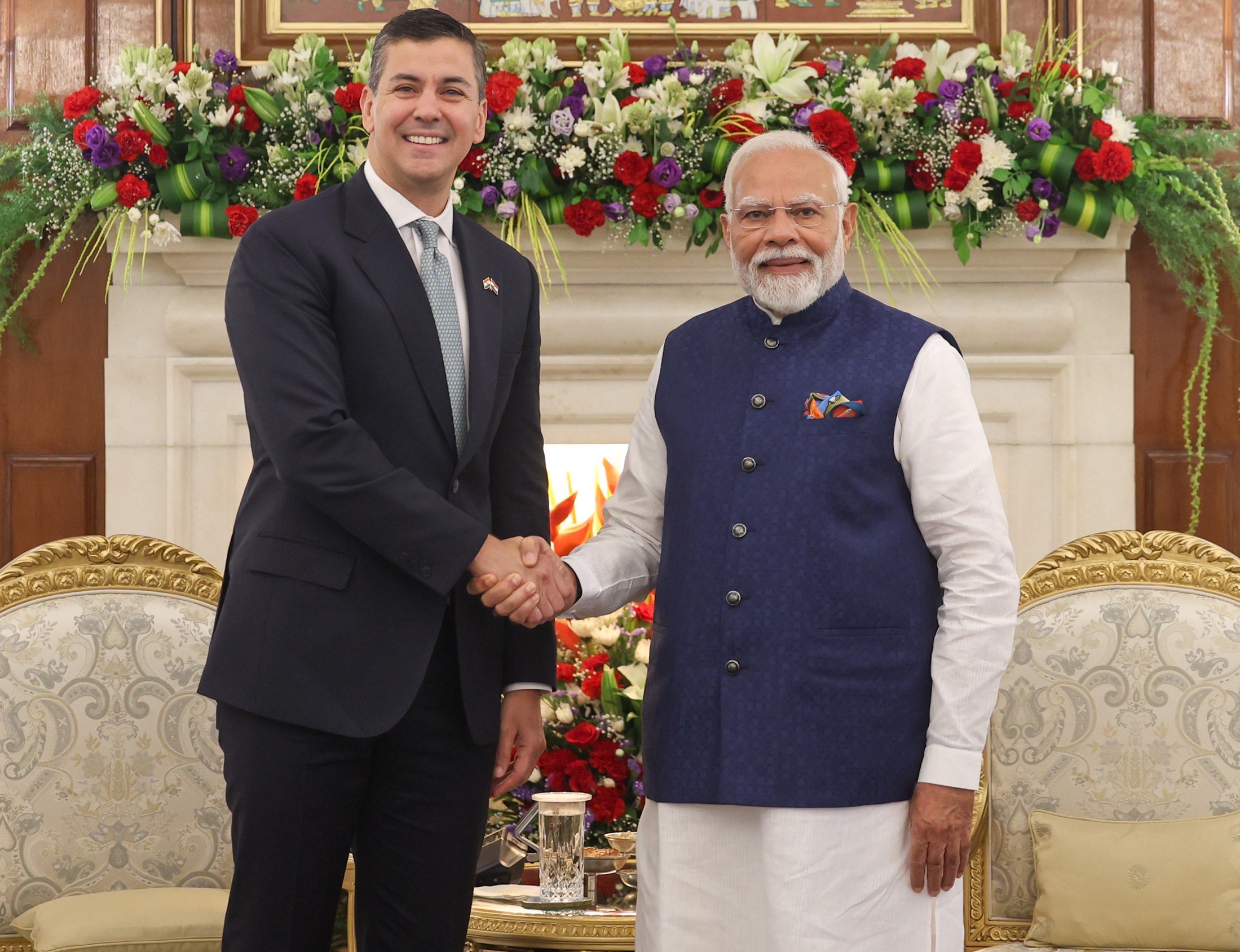
Prime Minister Narendra Modi meets the President of Paraguay Santiago Peña

Paraguay supported India's bid for election to the UN Human Rights Council for the term 2015–17.

On 30 December 2020, the Union Cabinet of India approved the opening an embassy in Asunción. The embassy was inaugurated in 2022.

President of Paraguay, Santiago Peña visited India in June 2025 and held delegation-level discussions with the Indian Prime Minister Narendra Modi. “Paraguay is ready to build bridges with India, with a strategic outlook and a commitment to a shared future of sustainable growth,” Peña posted on social media, while Narendra Modi described the meeting as productive, stating that Paraguay is a valuable partner in South America and that shared values unite both nations and issued a statement “Our talks covered diverse subjects, prime among which was close economic cooperation. There is immense potential in boosting trade linkages. We see sectors such as digital technology, critical minerals, energy, agriculture, health, and space as key areas where our nations can work together”.

== Bilateral agreements ==
An agreement between India and Paraguay provides visa-free travel privileges to holders of Diplomatic and Official passports since 1996.

== Trade ==
India and Paraguay are in India-MERCOSUR Preferential Trade Agreement (PTA).

On June 4, 2025, an Memorandum of understanding was signed between both the countries regarding improvements in the agricultural sector.

== Economic relations ==
Bilateral trade between India and Paraguay totaled US$212 million in 2015, registering a growth of 27% over the previous year. India exported $145 million worth of goods to Paraguay and imported $67 million worth of commodities. The main commodities exported from India to Paraguay are organic chemicals, vehicles, auto parts, cosmetics, machinery, pharmaceuticals, plastics, sound and image devices, aluminium, and rubber products. The main commodities exported from Paraguay to India are soya oil (94% of imports), sunflower oil, leather and wood.

== Culture ==
India and Paraguay signed a Cultural Exchange Program.

== Development ==
Through India's NTPC as a Project Management Consultant for the development of a solar park in Paraguayan Chaco.

== Education and technology ==
Citizens of Paraguay are eligible for scholarships under the Indian Technical and Economic Cooperation Programme. Many Paraguayan diplomats have received training in the Foreign Service Institute of India.

== Indian diaspora in Paraguay ==
As of December 2016, around 600 Indians, 200 of whom are Indian citizens, reside in Paraguay, primarily in the city of Ciudad del Est in south-eastern Paraguay. The community is mostly of Gujarati and Sindhi origin. They are primarily engaged in trade, wholesale and retail businesses.

== Indian embassy in Paraguay ==
The Embassy of India in Asunción is the upcoming diplomatic mission of the Republic of India to Paraguay.

Paraguay has been under the jurisdiction of Embassy of India, Buenos Aires since 1961. Plan to set up a new resident embassy in Paraguay was announced December 30, 2020.

Dinesh Bhatia is the current Indian Ambassador to Paraguay.
